= List of foreign Primeira Liga players =

This is a list of foreign players that have played in the Portuguese Primeira Liga.

In bold: players who have played at least one Primeira Liga game in the current season (2025–26), and are still at a club for which they have played. This does not include current players of a Primeira Liga club who have not played a Primeira Liga in the current season.

== Albania ==
- Edmond Abazi – Boavista – 1994–1996, Académica – 1996–1999
- Iván Balliu – Arouca – 2014–2015
- Klevis Dalipi – Santa Clara – 1997–2000
- Agon Mehmeti – Olhanense – 2013–2014
- Enea Mihaj – Famalicão – 2022–2025

== Algeria ==
- Hichem Belkaroui – Nacional – 2015–2016, Moreirense – 2017–2018
- Mohamed Belloumi – Farense – 2023–2025
- Billal Brahimi – Estrela da Amadora – 2025–2026
- Yacine Brahimi – Porto – 2014–2019
- Abdelmalek Cherrad – Marítimo – 2009–2011
- Karim Fellahi – Estoril – 2003–2005
- Kamel Ghilas – Vitória de Guimarães – 2006–2008
- Nabil Ghilas – Moreirense – 2011–2013, Porto – 2013–2014, Vitória de Setúbal – 2019–2020
- **Rafik Guitane** – Marítimo – 2020–2022, **Estoril** – 2022–, Braga – 2024–2025
- Rafik Halliche – Nacional – 2007–2010, Académica – 2012–2014, Estoril – 2017–2018, Moreirense – 2018–2020
- Yanis Hamache – Boavista – 2020–2023, Arouca – 2023–2024
- Okacha Hamzaoui – Nacional – 2016–2017, 2018–2019
- Youssef Haraoui – Chaves – 1992–1993
- Naoufel Khacef – Tondela – 2020–2022
- Rabah Madjer – Porto – 1985–1991
- Hakim Medane – Famalicão – 1991–1994, 1995–1996, Salgueiros – 1994–1995
- Abdeljalil Medioub – Tondela – 2020–2021
- Djamel Menad – Famalicão – 1990–1992, Belenenses – 1992–1993
- Zakaria Naidji – Gil Vicente – 2019–2020
- Billal Sebaihi – Estoril– 2015–2016
- Islam Slimani – Sporting CP – 2013–2017, 2021–2022
- El Arabi Hillel Soudani – Vitória de Guimarães – 2011–2013
- Aymen Tahar – Boavista – 2015–2016, 2017–2019
- Hassan Yebda – Benfica – 2008–2009, Belenenses – 2016–2018
- Kheireddine Zarabi – Belenenses – 2008–(2009), Vitória de Setúbal – 2009–2010, União Madeira – 2015–2016

== Angola ==
- Cláudio Abreu – Santa Clara – 1996–2002
- Fábio Abreu – Marítimo – 2014–2016, Moreirense – 2019–2021
- Marco Abreu – União da Madeira, Varzim – 1998–1999, 2000–2001
- Marco Airosa – Nacional – 2008–2009
- Akwá – Benfica – 1994–1995, Alverca – 1995–1997, Académica – 1997–1998
- Aurélio – Académica – 1997–1998
- Chico Banza – Marítimo – 2018–2019, Estrela da Amadora – 2024–2025
- João Batxi – Chaves – 2022–2023
- Filipe Bento – Espinho – 1992–1994
- Bernardo – Alverca, Nacional, Estrela da Amadora – 1999–2004
- Bodunha – Salgueiros, Braga – 2000-2003
- **Pedro Bondo** – **Famalicão** – 2024–
- Evandro Brandão – Olhanense – 2012–2013
- Bruno Gaspar – Vitória de Guimarães – 2014–2017, 2022–2025, Sporting CP – 2018–2019
- **Jonathan Buatu** – Rio Ave – 2018–2019, Aves – 2019–2020, **Gil Vicente** – 2023–
- Manuel Cafumana – Belenenses SAD – 2019–2020, Boavista – 2020–2021
- Edmilson Cambila – Estrela da Amadora – 2023–2024
- Abel Campos – Benfica, Estrela da Amadora, Braga – 1988–1992
- Canberra – Gil Vicente, Rio Ave, Leça, Desportivo das Aves – 1991–2001
- Carlitos – Paços de Ferreira – 2009–2010
- Carlos Pedro – Académica, Espinho – 1992–2000
- David Carmo – Braga – 2019–2022, Porto – 2022–2024
- Celino – Vitória de Setúbal – 2002–2003
- Chaínho – Estrela da Amadora, Porto, Marítimo, Nacional – 1994–2001, 2003–2007
- Hélder Costa – Estoril – 2024–2025
- Anderson Cruz – Rio Ave – 2020–2021
- Sandro Cruz – Benfica – 2021–2022, Chaves – 2022–2024, Gil Vicente – 2024–2025
- Nelson da Luz – Vitória de Guimarães – 2021–2024
- Dédé – Paços de Ferreira – 2007–2009
- Depú – Gil Vicente – 2022–2025
- Djalma – Marítimo – 2007–2011, Porto – 2011–2012, Farense – 2020–2021
- Édson Nobre – Paços de Ferreira – 2005–2009
- Estrela – Aves – 2019–2020
- Carlos Fernandes – Boavista – 2004–2005, 2007–2008, Rio Ave – 2009–2010
- Fernando – Santa Clara – 1997–2003, 2004–2008
- Paulo Figueiredo – Belenenses – 1992–1993, 1994–1995, Santa Clara – 1996–2004
- Núrio Fortuna – Braga – 2013–2015
- Franklin – Belenenses – 1997–2003
- Freddy – Estoril – 1998–2001, União de Leiria – 2001–2005, Desportivo das Aves – 2006–2007
- Fredy – Belenenses – 2008–2010, 2013–2015, 2017–2018, Belenenses SAD – 2018–2019
- **João Gastão** – **Estrela da Amadora** – 2025–
- Gelson Dala – Sporting CP – 2016–2017, Rio Ave – 2017–2021
- Ganga – Braga – 1995–1997
- João Ricardo – Moreirense – 2000–2005
- Kadú – Porto – 2011–2012
- Kali – Santa Clara – 2001–2005
- Manuel Keliano – Estrela da Amadora – 2023–2025
- **Khaly** – **Casa Pia** – 2024–
- Kialonda Gaspar – Estrela da Amadora – 2023–2024
- Genséric Kusunga – União Madeira – 2015–2016
- Lázaro – Estoril, Penafiel, Estrela da Amadora – 1989–1994, 1995–2004
- **Lucas João** – **Nacional** – 2013–2015, 2025–
- Luisinho – Braga – 1994–1996
- André Macanga – Salgueiros, Alverca, Vitória de Guimarães, Académica, Boavista – 1999–2004
- Mantorras – Alverca – 1999–2001, Benfica – 2001–2009
- Manu – Estrela da Amadora – 2024–2025
- Hugo Marques – Farense – 2020–2021
- Rui Marques – Marítimo – 2004–2005
- Mateus – Gil Vicente – 2006–2007, Boavista – 2007–2008, 2017–2020, Nacional – 2008–2014, Arouca – 2015–2017
- Maurito – União de Leiria – 2003–2004
- Mauro – Paços de Ferreira, Belenenses – 2001–2004
- Mawete Júnior – Benfica, Braga – 1999–2002
- António Mendonça – Varzim, Belenenses, Estrela da Amadora – 1999–2009
- Dolly Menga – Braga – 2014–2015, Tondela – 2015–2016
- Felício Milson – Marítimo – 2019–2022
- Miro – Gil Vicente – 2023–2024, Tondela – 2025–2026
- **Beni Mukendi** – Casa Pia – 2022–2025, **Vitória de Guimarães** – 2024–
- Nélson – Campomaiorense – 1997–1998
- Osvaldo – Naval – 2006–2007
- Ary Papel – Moreirense – 2016–2017
- Paulão – Vitória de Setúbal – 1994–1995, Benfica – 1995–1997, Académica Coimbra – 1997–1998
- Fua Pinto – Torreense, Boavista, União de Leiria – 1991–1992, 1993–1997
- Júlio Pinto – Estrela da Amadora – 1998–1999
- Quinzinho – Porto, União de Leiria, Rio Ave, Farense, Desportivo das Aves, Alverca – 1995–2002
- Roberto – Estoril, União de Leiria, Felgueiras – 1986–1990, 1991-1993, 1995–1996
- Rudy – Belenenses – 2013–2014
- Saavedra – Belenenses – 1988–1991, Chaves – 1991–1993
- Santana – Vitória de Guimarães – 2008–2010
- Show – Belenenses SAD, Boavista – 2019–2021
- **Alexandre Sola** – **Estrela da Amadora** – 2024–
- César Sousa – Belenenses SAD – 2020–2022
- Sousa – Campomaiorense – 1989–2001
- Stélvio – Braga – 2007–2009, União de Leiria – 2009–2010
- Álvaro Cardoso Teixeira – Vitória de Setúbal – 1982–1986, Belenenses – 1986–1995, Felgueiras – 1995–1996
- Júlio Tomé – Estrela da Amadora – (1998)–1999
- Valdinho – Gil Vicente – 2012–2013
- Vata – Varzim, Benfica, Estrela da Amadora – 1984–1992
- **André Vidigal** – Marítimo – 2021–2023, **Alverca** – 2026–
- Jorge Filipe Vidigal – Sporting CP, Beira-Mar – 2001-2002, 2006–2007
- Lito Vidigal – Belenenses, Santa Clara – 1995–2003
- Wilson – Gil Vicente, Belenenses – 1994–2005
- Wilson Eduardo – Beira-Mar – 2010–2011, Olhanense – 2011–2012, Académica – 2012–2013, Sporting CP – 2013–2014, Braga – 2015–2020
- Zé Kalanga – Boavista – 2007–2008

== Argentina ==
- Vicente Di Paola - Lusit. Évora - 1953-1955
- José Valle - Lusit. Évora - 1952-1953, Porto – 1953–1956
- Alberto Acosta – Sporting CP – 1998–2001
- Marcos Acuña – Sporting CP – 2017–2020
- Pablo Aimar – Benfica – 2008–2013
- Mauro Airez – Belenenses – 1991–1995, Benfica – 1995–1997, Estrela da Amadora – 1997–1998
- César Asís – Portimonense SC – 2008–(2009)
- Fernando Ávalos – Boavista – 2001–2003, Nacional – 2003–2008, Belenenses – 2008–(2009)
- Hernán Barcos – Sporting CP – 2015–2016
- **Enzo Barrenechea** – **Benfica** – 2025–
- Leandro Barrera – Marítimo – 2018–2020
- Carlos Barrionuevo – Penafiel – 2005–2006
- Rodrigo Battaglia – Braga – 2013–2014, 2016–2017, Moreirense – 2014–2016, Chaves – 2016–2017, Sporting CP – 2017–2020
- Fernando Belluschi – Porto – 2009–2012
- Nelson Benítez – Porto – 2008–2009, Leixões – 2009–2010
- Óscar Benítez – Braga – 2016–2017
- Gonzalo Bergessio – Benfica – 2007–2008
- Maxi Bevacqua – Braga – (2005)–2006, Estrela da Amadora – 2005–(2006)
- Mario Bolatti – Porto – 2007–2009
- Gabriel Miguel Bordi – Braga – 2002–2003
- Carlos Bossio – Benfica – 1999–2001, 2002–2004, Vitória de Setúbal – 2001–2002
- Leonel Bucca – Estrela da Amadora – 2023–2025
- Gastón Campi – Chaves – 2018–2019, Arouca – 2021–2022
- Claudio Caniggia – Benfica – 1994–1995
- Federico Cartabia – Braga – 2016–2017
- Facundo Cáseres – Farense – 2023–2024, Gil Vicente – 2024–2027
- Sebastián Cattaneo – Académica – 1998–2000
- Franco Cervi – Benfica – 2016–2021
- Leandro Chaparro – Estoril – 2015–2016
- Lucas Colitto – Arouca – 2014–2015
- Santiago Colombatto – Famalicão – 2022–2023
- Germán Conti – Benfica – 2018–2019
- Jorge Correa – Marítimo – 2017–2021
- Tomás Costa – Porto – 2008–2010
- Matías Degra – Paços de Ferreira – 2013–2014
- Hernán de la Fuente – Famalicão – 2021–2023
- Ángel Di María – Benfica – 2007–2010, 2023–2025
- Andrés Díaz – Benfica – (2007)–2008
- Aldo Duscher – Sporting CP – 1998–2000
- **Claudio Echeverri** – **Benfica** – 2026–
- Juan Esnáider – Porto – 2001-2002
- Maxi Estévez – Estrela da Amadora – 2005-2006
- Raúl Estévez – Académica – 2006–2007
- Federico Falcone – Aves – 2017–2018, Boavista – 2018–2019
- Ernesto Farías – Porto – 2007–2010
- Luis Fariña – Aves – 2017–2019
- Enzo Fernández – Benfica – 2022–2023
- José Luis Fernández – Benfica – 2010–2011, Olhanense – 2012–2013
- Mariano Fernández – Beira-Mar – 2002–2003
- **Cristian Ferreira** – **Académico Viseu** – 2026–
- Facundo Ferreyra – Benfica – 2018–2019, 2020–2021
- Nicolás Gaitán – Benfica – 2010–2016, Braga – 2020–2021, Paços de Ferreira – 2021–2023
- Diego Galván – Beira-Mar – 2002–2003
- Gonzalo Garavano – Estrela da Amadora – (2008)–2009
- Ezequiel Garay – Benfica – 2011–2014
- Gabriel Gervino – União de Leiria – 1992–1998
- Bruno Giménez Marioni – Sporting CP – 1997–1999
- Brian Gómez – Feirense – 2018–2019
- Lucho González – Porto – 2005–2009, 2012–2014
- Mariano González – Porto – 2007–2011
- Leandro Grimi – Sporting CP – 2007–2011
- Enzo Gutiérrez – Marítimo – 2008–(2009)
- Gabriel Heinze – Sporting CP – 1998–1999
- Mauricio Hanuch – Sporting CP – (1999)–2000, Santa Clara – 2001–2002
- Hugo Ibarra – Porto – 2001–2002
- Emiliano Insúa – Sporting CP – 2011–2013
- Imanol Iriberri – Boavista – 2015–2016
- Franco Jara – Benfica – 2010–2012, 2014–2015
- Julián Kmet – Sporting CP – 1998–1999
- César La Paglia – Vitória de Setúbal – (2006)–2007
- Federico Lagorio – Marítimo – 2000–2001
- Rodrigo Lamardo – Olhanense – 2009–2010
- Cristian Lema – Benfica – 2018–2019
- Pedro Maurício Levato – Beira-Mar – 2001–2005, 2008–2009
- Lisandro López (born 1983) – Porto – 2005–2009
- Lisandro López (born 1989) – Benfica – 2014–2018
- Ricardo Lunari – Farense – 1999–(2000)
- Andrés Madrid – Braga – 2005–2011, Porto – 2008–2009, Nacional – 2011–2012
- Braian Mansilla – Vitória de Setúbal – 2019–2020, Farense – 2020–2021
- Julio Marchant – Nacional – 2004–2007
- Agustín Marchesín – Porto – 2019–2022
- Lucas Mareque – Porto – 2006–(2007)
- Carlos Marinelli – Braga – 2005–2006
- Tomás Martínez – Braga – 2016–2017
- **Tobías Medina** – **Rio Ave** – 2024–
- Víctor Meza – Olhanense – 2011–2012
- Matías Miramontes – União de Leiria – 2005–2006
- Emanuel Molina – Vitória de Guimarães – 2011–2012
- Daniel Monllor – Boavista – 2014–2015
- Julián Montenegro – Boavista – 2014–2015
- Javier Martín Musa – Marítimo – 2001–2004
- Luciano Nequecaur – Marítimo – 2019–2020
- Federico Nieto – Estrela da Amadora – (2005)–2006
- Nicolás Otamendi – Porto – 2010–2014, Benfica – 2020–2026
- Franco Parodi – Rio Ave – 2009
- Walter Paz – Gil Vicente – 1994–1995
- **Francisco Petrasso** – **Rio Ave** – 2024–
- Joaquín Pereyra – Famalicão – 2020–2021
- Enzo Pérez – Benfica – 2011–2015
- **Nehuén Pérez** – Famalicão – 2019–2020, **Porto** – 2024–
- Tomás Pérez – Porto – 2024–2025
- Rubén Piaggio – Marítimo – 1999–2000
- Juan Martín Pietravallo –Olhanense – 2009–2010
- Piojo – Tondela – 2015–2016
- Marcelo Pontiroli – Varzim – 2002–2003
- Sebastián Prediguer – Porto – 2009–2012
- Martin Prest – Marítimo – 2006–2007
- **Gianluca Prestianni** – **Benfica** – 2023–
- Livio Prieto – Paços de Ferreira – 2008–2009
- Facundo Quiroga – Sporting CP – 1998–2000, 2001–2004
- Fabián Rinaudo – Sporting CP – 2011–2014
- Emanuel Rivas – Vitória de Guimarães – 2005–2006
- Gabriel Rodríguez – Gil Vicente – 2012–2013
- Pablo Rodríguez – Beira-Mar – (2004)–2005
- Patito Rodríguez – Moreirense – 2018–2020
- Marcos Rojo – Sporting CP – 2012–2014
- Benjamín Rollheiser – Benfica – 2023–2025
- Leandro Romagnoli – Sporting CP – 2006–2009
- Iván Rossi – Marítimo – 2021–2022
- Alan Ruiz – Sporting CP – 2016–2018, Arouca – 2021–2023, Estrela da Amadora – 2024–2025
- Eduardo Salvio – Benfica – 2010–2011, 2012–2019
- Mario Santana – Olhanense – 2013–2014
- Javier Saviola – Benfica – 2009–2012
- José Shaffer – Benfica – 2009–2010, União de Leiria – 2011–2012
- Jonathan Silva – Sporting CP – 2014–2016, 2017–2018
- Leonardo Tambussi – Boavista – 2006–2008
- Mateo Tanlongo – Sporting CP – 2022–2023, Rio Ave – 2023–2024
- Fernando Tissone – Aves – 2017–2018, Nacional – 2018–2019
- Mariano Toedtli – Marítimo – 1999–2000
- Marco Torsiglieri – Sporting CP – 2010–2011
- Cristian Trombetta – Leixões – 2009–2010
- Roberto Tucker – Leixões – 2009–2010
- Carlos Valenzuela – Famalicão – 2020–2021
- Diego Valeri – Porto – 2009–2010
- **Alan Varela** – **Porto** – 2023–
- Federico Varela – Portimonense – 2017–2018
- Lucho Vega – Estoril – 2021–2022, Marítimo – 2022–2023
- Nicolás Vélez – Belenenses SAD – 2018–2020
- Luciano Vietto – Sporting CP – 2019–2021
- Valentín Viola – Sporting CP – 2012–2013
- Agustín Vuletich – Arouca – 2014–2016

== Armenia ==
- Gevorg Ghazaryan – Marítimo – 2015–2018, Chaves – 2018–2019
- Artur Serobyan – Casa Pia – 2023–2024

== Australia ==
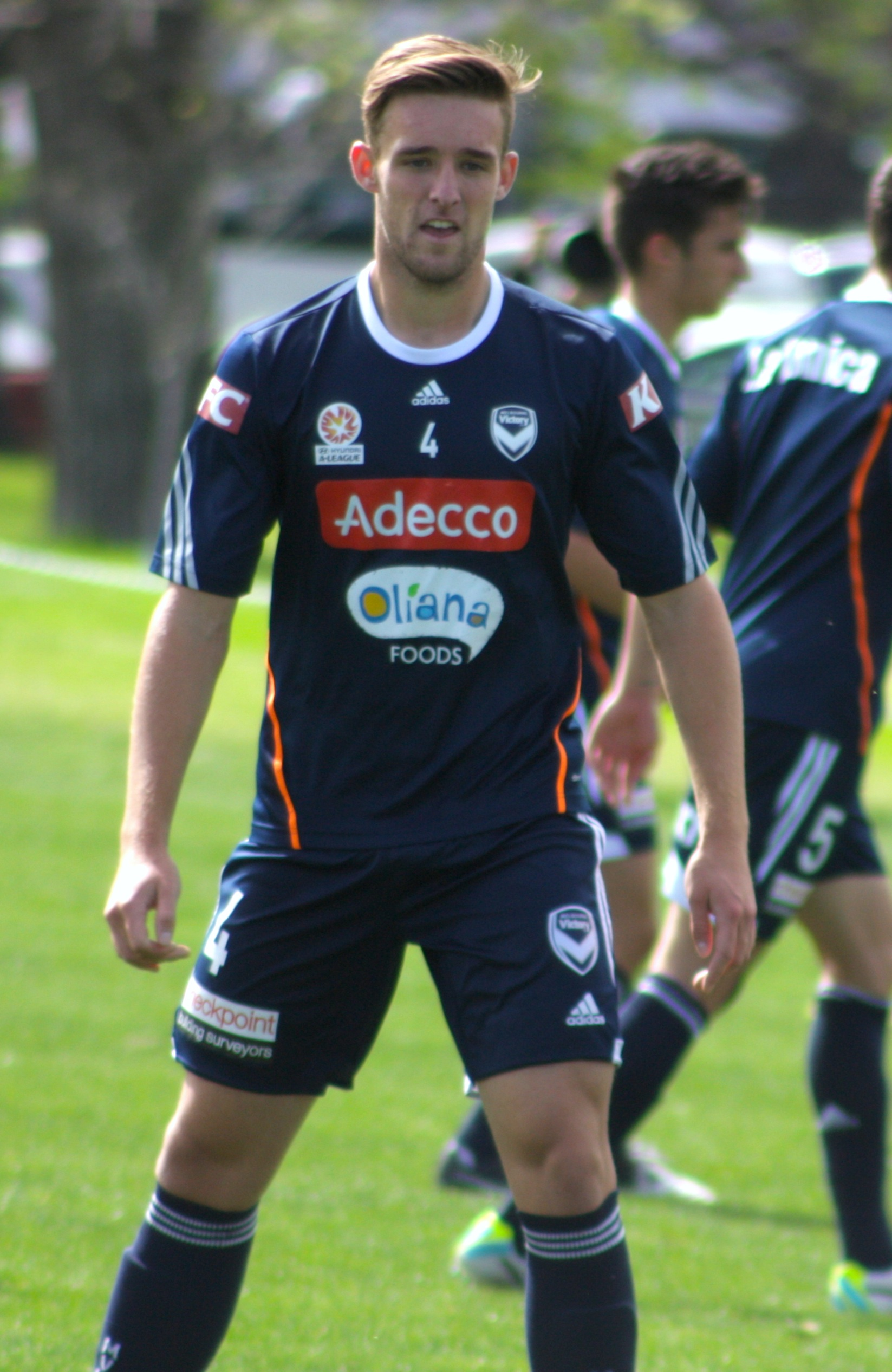
Nick Ansell

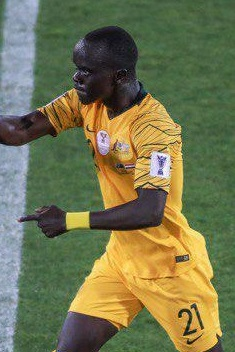
Awer Mabil

- Nick Ansell – Tondela – 2017–2018
- Vlado Bozinovski – Beira-Mar, Sporting CP, Paços de Ferreira, Felgueiras – 1989-1992, 1993–1996
- Anthony Carter – Santa Clara – 2025–2026
- **Alessandro Circati** – **Benfica** – 2026–
- Michael Curcija – Braga – 2000–2001
- Jason Davidson – Paços de Ferreira – 2009–2010
- Eugene Galeković – Beira-Mar – 2004–2005
- **Nestory Irankunda** – **Sporting CP** – 2026–
- Awer Mabil – Paços de Ferreira – 2017–2018
- Ernie Tapai – Estoril – 1993–1994

== Austria ==
- Felix Bacher – Estoril – 2024–2026
- Hans-Peter Berger – Leixões – 2008–2010
- Markus Berger – Académica – 2007–2012, Gil Vicente – 2014–2015, Tondela – 2015–2016
- Darko Bodul – Nacional – 2010–2011
- Florian Grillitsch – Braga – 2025–2026
- **Arnel Jakupović** – **Vitória de Guimarães** – 2026–
- Marc Janko – Porto – 2011–2012
- Rolf Landerl – Penafiel – 2004–2005
- Valentino Lazaro – Benfica – 2021–2022
- Roland Linz – Boavista – 2006–2007, Braga – 2007–2009, Belenenses – 2013–2014
- Alexander Schmidt – Vizela – 2022–2023
- Arnold Wetl – Porto – 1996–1997

== Azerbaijan ==
- Kamran Aghayev – Boavista – 2016–2017
- Richard Almeida – Gil Vicente – 2011–2012
- Renat Dadashov – Paços de Ferreira – (2019)–2020, Tondela – 2021–2022
- Vali Gasimov – Vitória de Setúbal – 1997–1999
- Emin Makhmudov – Boavista – 2016–2017

== Barbados ==
- Peter Hinds – Marítimo – 1990–1992, Gil Vicente – 1992–1993

== Belarus ==
- Renan Bressan – Rio Ave – 2014–2016, Chaves – 2016–2019
- Vitali Kutuzov – Sporting CP – 2002–2003
- Vladislav Morozov – Arouca – 2023–2025

== Belgium ==
- Patrick Asselman – Marítimo – 1996–2000
- Serge Cadorin – Portimonense – 1983–1987, 1988–1989, Académica – 1987–1988
- **Zeno Debast** – **Sporting CP** – 2024–
- Steven Defour – Porto – 2011–2014
- Stéphane Demol – Porto – 1989–1990, Braga – 1994–1995
- Laurent Depoitre – Porto – 2016–2017
- François D'Onofrio – Olhanense – 2012–2013
- Guy Hubart – Boavista – 1986–1991, Estrela da Amadora – 1991–1995
- **Ikker Julian** – **Alverca** – 2025–
- **Bryan Limbombe** – **Marítimo** – 2026–
- **Dodi Lukébakio** – **Benfica** – 2025–
- Kevin Mirallas – Moreirense – 2021–2022
- **René Mitongo** – **Estrela da Amadora** – 2026–
- Mbo Mpenza – Sporting CP – 1999–2001
- **Cédric Nuozzi** – **Alverca** – 2025–
- David Paas – Vitória de Guimarães – 1996–1999
- **Benjamin Pauwels** – **Casa Pia** – 2026–
- Michel Preud'homme – Benfica – 1994–1999
- **Mo Salah** – **Casa Pia** – 2026–
- Erdem Şen – Marítimo – 2016–2018, Chaves – 2018–2019
- Yves Van der Straeten – Marítimo – 1996–2000
- Alain Thiriart – Portimonense, Desportivo das Aves, Beira-Mar, Tirsense, Espinho – 1984–1993
- **Antef Tsoungui** – **Estoril** – 2025–
- Jan Vertonghen – Benfica – 2020–2023
- Patrick Vervoort – Vitória de Guimarães – 1996–1997
- Filip De Wilde – Sporting CP – 1996–1998
- Axel Witsel – Benfica – 2011–2013

== Benin ==
- Sessi D'Almeida – Tondela – 2021–2022
- Emmanuel Imorou – Braga – 2011–2012
- Oumar Tchomogo – Vitória de Setúbal – 2005–2006, Vitória de Guimarães – 2006–2007

== Bolivia ==
- Ronald García – Alverca – 2001–2004
- Edivaldo Hermoza – Naval – 2008–2011, Moreirense – 2014–2015
- Gualberto Mojica – Paços de Ferreira – 2006–2007
- **Fernando Nava** – **Nacional** – 2026–
- Erwin Sánchez – Benfica – 1990–1991, 1997–1998, Estoril – 1991–1992, Boavista – 1992–1997, 1998–2004
- Mauricio Saucedo – Vitoria de Guimarães – 2011–2012

== Bosnia and Herzegovina ==
- **Adrian Leon Barišić** – **Braga** – 2025–
- Nail Beširović – Estrela da Amadora – 1991–1992, Académica – 1994–1995, Espinho – 1995–1997, Farense – 1997–2001
- **Vladan Danilović** – Nacional – 2020–2021, **Marítimo** – 2026–
- Amar Dedić – Benfica – 2025–2027
- Emir Granov – Farense – 1998–1999
- Goran Kovačević – União da Madeira – 1994–1997
- Vladan Kovačević – Sporting CP – 2024–2025
- Dane Kuprešanin – Famalicão – 1991–1992, Vitória de Guimarães – 1992–1996
- Adi Mehremić – Aves – 2019–2020
- Nikola Milinković – Chaves – 1996–1997, Alverca – 1999–2001
- **Nail Omerović** – **Estoril** – 2026–
- Srdjan Slagalo – Varzim – 1995–1998
- Jasminko Velić – Estrela da Amadora – 1996–1998
- Nermin Zolotić – Casa Pia – 2022–2025

== Brazil ==
- List of Brazilian Primeira Liga players

== Bulgaria ==
- Blagoy Alexandrov – Chaves – 1995–1996
- Marin Bakalov – Chaves – 1992–1993
- Krassimir Balakov – Sporting CP – 1990–1995
- Krasimir Bezinski – Portimonense – 1989–1991
- Krum Bibishkov – Marítimo – 2004–2005, Penafiel – 2005–2006, Académica – 2009–2010
- Valeri Bojinov – Sporting CP – 2011–2012
- **Atanas Chernev** – **Estrela da Amadora** – 2025–
- Georgi Chilikov – Nacional – 2005–2007
- Vasil Dragolov – Torreense – 1991–1992
- Plamen Getov – Portimonense, Chaves – 1989–1991, 1994–1996
- Boncho Genchev – Sporting CP – 1991–1992
- Zhivko Gospodinov – Fafe – 1988–1990
- Valentin Ignatov – União Madeira – 1997–1998
- Ilian Iliev – Benfica – 1995–1997, Marítimo – 1999–2002
- Sylvester Jasper – Portimonense – 2023–2024
- Emil Kostadinov – Porto – 1990–1994
- Kostadin Kostadinov – Braga – 1987–1988
- Vanio Kostov – Sporting CP – 1982–1985, Belenenses – 1985–1986, Farense – 1987–1988
- Andrian Kraev – Casa Pia – 2024–2025
- Bozhidar Kraev – Gil Vicente – 2019–2020, Famalicão – 2020–2021
- Todor Kutchoukov – Beira-Mar – 2006–2007
- Todor Kyuchukov – Beira-Mar – 2006–2007
- Petar Mihtarski – Porto – 1991–1992, Famalicão – 1992–1993
- Borislav Mihaylov – Belenenses – 1989–1991
- Stoycho Mladenov – Belenenses – 1986–1989, Vitória de Setúbal – 1989–1991, Estoril – 1991–1993
- Kiril Nikolov – Braga – 2003–(2004)
- Dian Petkov – Belenenses – (1997)–1998
- Steven Petkov – Feirense – 2018–2019
- Petar Petrov – Beira-Mar – 1989–1993
- Ayan Sadakov – Belenenses – 1989–1991
- Dimitar Sheytanov – Aves – 2019–2020
- Simeon Slavchev – Sporting CP – 2014–15
- Georgi Slavkov – Chaves – 1987–1992
- Nikola Spasov – Farense – 1986–1988, Salgueiros – 1988–1989, Paços de Ferreira – 1989–1990, 1991–1992, S.C. Beira-Mar – 1990–1991, Rio Ave – 1992–1993
- Yulian Spasov – Paços de Ferreira – 1989–1997
- Nikolai Stanchev – Chaves – 1998–1999
- Stanimir Stoilov – Campomaiorense – 1995–1997
- Lachezar Tanev – Chaves – 1989–1990
- Plamen Timnev – Chaves – (1998)–1999
- Georgi Velinov – Braga – 1987–1988
- Iliya Voynov – Portimonense – 1989–1991, Estoril – 1991–1995, Estrela da Amadora – 1995–1996
- Ivaylo Yordanov – Sporting CP – 1991–2001
- Antoni Zdravkov – Marítimo – 1990–(1991), Nacional – 1991–1992
- Radoslav Zdravkov – Chaves – 1986–1989, Braga – 1989–1990

== Burkina Faso ==
- Stéphane Agbre Dasse – Olhanense – 2009–2010, Arouca – 2013–2014
- Trova Boni – Belenenses SAD – 2021–2022
- Abderrahmane Diarra – Paços de Ferreira – 2009–2010
- **Lohann Doucet** – **Vitória de Guimarães** – 2026–
- Issa Kaboré – Benfica – 2024–2025
- Hervé Koffi – Belenenses SAD – 2019–2020
- Régis N'do – Estrela da Amadora – 2023–2024
- Abou Ouattara – Vitória de Guimarães – 2019–2021
- Issouf Ouattara – União de Leiria – 2009–2010
- Saïdou Panandétiguiri – União de Leiria – 2009–2011
- Nii Plange – Sporting CP – 2012–2013, Vitória de Guimarães – 2013–2015, Académica – 2015–2016
- Bakary Saré – Vitória de Guimarães – 2014–2016, Moreirense – 2016–2017, Belenenses – 2017–2018
- Stéphane – Olhanense – 2009–2010, Arouca – 2013–2014
- Mamadou Tall – União de Leiria – 2008–2011
- Edmond Tapsoba – Vitória de Guimarães – 2019–2020
- Lassina Touré – Marítimo – 2015–2016
- Narcisse Yameogo – Braga – 2003–2004
- Abdoul Zangré – Chaves – 2018–2019
- Djibril Zidnaba – Moreirense – 2014–2015
- Ousseni Zongo – União de Leiria – 2007–2009

== Cameroon ==
- Vincent Aboubakar – Porto – 2014–2016, 2017–2020
- Georges Nnomo Ambassa – Boavista – (2004)–2005
- Clément Beaud – Académica – 2004–2005
- André Bikey – Paços de Ferreira – 2003–2004, Desportivo das Aves – 2004–2005
- Michel Pensée Billong – Desportivo das Aves – 2000–2001
- Gilles Binya – Benfica – 2007–2009
- Yohanna Buba – Estoril – 2003–2006, Beira-Mar – 2005–2008
- Donald Djoussé – Marítimo – 2015–2017
- **Danel Dongmo** – **Nacional** – 2026–
- Roudolphe Douala – Boavista – 1998–2000, Desportivo das Aves – 2000–2001, Gil Vicente – 2001–2002, União de Leiria – 2002–2004, Sporting CP – 2004–2007
- Ernest Ebongué – Vitória de Guimarães – 1988–1989
- David Embé – Belenenses – 1993–1994
- Guy Essame – Boavista – 2005–2008
- Marco Essimi – Alverca – 2026–2027
- Yan Eteki – Casa Pia – 2022–2023
- Sidoine Fogning – Boavista – 2024–2025
- Fabrice Fokobo – Sporting CP – 2012–2013, Arouca – 2014–2015
- Ohoulo Framelin – Nacional – 2018–2019
- Norbert Haymamba – Arouca – 2021–2022
- Ibrahim Koneh – Boavista – 2018–2019
- James Léa Siliki – Estoril – 2022–2023
- Émile Mbamba – Vitória de Setúbal – 2006–2007
- Émile Mbouh – Vitória de Guimarães – 1990–1991
- Georges Messi – Olhanense – 2009–2010
- Albert Meyong – Vitória de Setúbal – 2000–2005, 2012–2013, 2015–2017 Belenenses – 2005–2006, 2007–(2008), Braga – 2008–2012
- Jean-Jacques Missé-Missé – Sporting CP – 1996–1997
- Jacques Momha – Vitória de Guimarães – 2006–2009
- Stève Mvoué – Portimonense – 2023–2024
- Danny Namaso – Porto – 2021–2025
- Berlin Ndebe-Nlome – Paços de Ferreira – 2009–2010
- Serge N'Gal – União de Leiria – 2006–2008, 2010–2011, Académica – 2012–2013
- **Abdel Kader Njoya** – **Nacional** – 2026–
- Alain N'Kong – Nacional – 2004–2005
- Paul-Georges Ntep – Boavista – 2021–2022
- Douglas Pajetat – Feirense – 2011–2012
- Patrick – Farense – 2001–2003
- William Paul – Desportivo das Aves – 2005–2007
- Christian Pouga – Leixões – 2009–2010, Marítimo – 2011–2012, Boavista – 2014–2016
- Edgar Salli – Académica – 2014–2015
- Joel Tagueu – Marítimo – 2017–2023, Nacional – 2024–2025
- Duplexe Tchamba – Casa Pia – 2022–2026
- Azongha Tembeng – Tondela – 2018–2019
- William Andem – Boavista – 1997–2007
- Jean Paul Yontcha – Belenenses – 2009–2010, Olhanense – 2010–2013
- Herve Xavier Zengue – Leixões – 2006–2007

== Canada ==
- Fernando Aguiar – Marítimo – 1994–1995, Nacional – 1995–1997, Beira-Mar – 1999–2001, União de Leiria – 2002–2003, Benfica – 2003–2004, Penafiel – 2004–2005
- Charles-Andreas Brym – Belenenses SAD – 2019–2020
- Alex Bunbury – Marítimo – 1993–1999
- Stephen Eustáquio – Chaves – 2017–2019, Paços de Ferreira – 2019–2022, Porto – 2021–2027
- Ricardo Ferreira – Olhanense – 2013–2014, Paços de Ferreira – 2014–2015, Braga – 2015–2018, Belenenses SAD – 2019–2020, Farense – 2020–2021
- Dieu-Merci Michel – Vitória de Guimarães – 2024–2025
- Pedro Pacheco – Nacional – 2009–2010, Santa Clara – 2018–2019
- Steven Vitória – Estoril – 2012–2013, Benfica – 2013–2014, Moreirense – 2019–2022, Chaves – 2022–2024, Boavista – 2024–2025

== Cape Verde ==
- Tiago Almeida – Belenenses – 2015–2016, Moreirense – 2016–2017
- Patrick Andrade – Moreirense – 2014–2016
- **Telmo Arcanjo** – Tondela – 2019–2022, **Vitória de Guimarães** – 2024–
- Babanco – Olhanense – 2012–2013, Estoril – 2013–2016, Feirense – 2016–2019
- Baroti – Estrela da Amadora – 1989–1993
- Bebé – Rio Ave – 2012–2013, Paços de Ferreira – 2013–2014, Benfica – 2014–2015
- Nuno Borges – Nacional – 2020–2021
- Brito – Gil Vicente – 2012–2014, Boavista – 2014–2015, Marítimo – 2016–2017
- Jovane Cabral – Sporting CP – 2018–2023, Estrela da Amadora – 2024–2026
- Caló – Salgueiros – 2000–2002
- João Correia – Chaves – 2022–2024
- Cuca – Casa Pia – 2022–2023
- Dady – Belenenses – 2006–2007, Olhanense – 2010-2012
- Danielson – União de Leiria – 2007–2009
- Diney – Marítimo – 2015–2016, 2017–2018
- Djaniny – União de Leiria – 2011–2012, Olhanense – 2012–2013, Nacional – 2013–2014
- Duka – Espinho – 1994–2000, Campomaiorense – 2000–2002
- Edivândio – Marítimo – 2010–2012, 2013–2014
- Emerson Gabei – Estrela da Amadora – 2005–2006, Beira-Mar – 2006–2009
- Ernesto – Alverca – 2000–2005
- **Ivanildo Fernandes** – Moreirense – 2018–2019, Vizela – 2021–2023, **Nacional** – 2026–
- Patrick Fernandes – Tondela – 2018–2019, Farense – 2020–2021, Chaves – 2022–2023
- Vargas Fernandes – Gil Vicente – 2000–2001
- Dário Furtado – Gil Vicente – 2000–2001, 2002–2003
- **Fabrício Garcia** – **Estoril** – 2023–, Alverca – 2025–2026
- Gegé – Marítimo – 2013–2015, Arouca – 2015–2017, Paços de Ferreira – 2016–2017
- Gerson – Belenenses – 1997–1999, 2000–2004
- Ricardo Gomes – Vitória de Guimarães – 2013–2016, Nacional – 2015–2017
- Thierry Graça – Estoril – 2016–2017
- Héldon – Marítimo – 2010–2014, Sporting CP – 2013–2015, Rio Ave – 2015–2017, Vitória de Guimarães – 2017–2018
- Jimmy Ines – Académica – 2014–2015
- Janício – Vitória de Setúbal – 2005–2009
- Jójó – Belenenses SAD – 2021–2022
- Kay – Belenenses – 2013–2014
- Kiki – Vitória de Guimarães – 1982–1984, Braga – 1987–1989, 1992–1993, Porto – 1989–1992, Paços de Ferreira – 1993–1994
- Kisley – União Madeira – 2015–2016
- Kuca – Estoril – 2014–2015, Belenenses – 2015–2016, Rio Ave – 2015–2016, Arouca – 2016–2017, Boavista – 2017–2018, Feirense – 2018–2019
- Kukula – Marítimo – 2012–2013, 2014–2015
- Lito – Moreirense – 2003–2005, Naval – 2005–2007, Académica Coimbra – 2007–2010, Portimonense – 2010–2011
- Dailon Livramento – Casa Pia – 2025–2026
- Lixa – Vitória de Guimarães – 1999–2003
- Vasco Lopes – AVS – 2024–2025
- Sidny Lopes Cabral – Estrela da Amadora – 2025–2026, Benfica – 2025–2026
- Mailó – Belenenses – 2014–2015
- Mateus – Beira-Mar – 2007–2008, Rio Ave – 2008–2009
- Diogo Mendes – Marítimo – 2021–2023
- Sandro Mendes – Vitória de Setúbal – 1994–1995, 2000–2005, 2006–2010
- Mirandinha – Vitória de Guimarães – 1998–2000
- Rivaldo Morais – Farense – 2024–2025
- **David Moreira** – **Gil Vicente** – 2026–
- Vítor Moreno – Estoril – 2005, Vitória de Guimarães – 2005–2007, Estrela da Amadora – 2007–2009, União de Leiria – 2009–2010
- Nilson – Portimonense – 2010–2011, União Madeira – 2015–2016
- Nilton – Boavista – 1999–2000, Gil Vicente – 2001–2002, Penafiel – 2004–2006
- Nilton – Salgueiros – 1995–1997
- Nivaldo – Académica – 2011–2013
- Pecks – Gil Vicente – 2012–2015
- Pelé – Farense – 2002–2003, Belenenses – 2003–2006
- Hildeberto Pereira – Vitória de Setúbal – 2018–2020, Portimonense – 2023–2024
- Péricles Pereira – Gil Vicente – 2012–2015
- Piguita – Famalicão – 1993–1994, Beira-Mar – 1994–1995
- Kevin Pina – Chaves – 2022–2023
- Wagner Pina – Estoril – 2023–2025
- Pina – Vitória de Setúbal – 2001–2002
- Pinha – União de Leiria – (1996)–1997, 1998–1999
- Carlos Ponck – Paços de Ferreira – 2015–2016, Chaves – 2016–2017, 2022–2023, Aves – 2017–2019, Moreirense – 2023–2025, AVS – 2025–2026
- Rambé – Belenenses – 2013–2014, Vitória de Setúbal – 2014–2015
- Ricardo – Beira-Mar – 2004–2008, Paços de Ferreira – 2008–2010, 2012–2018, Vitória de Guimarães – 2010–11
- Nuno Rocha – Marítimo – 2013–2014
- Rui César – Marítimo – 1999–2001
- José Semedo – Rio Ave – 2008–2009
- Sérgio Semedo – Marítimo – 2012–2013, Gil Vicente – 2014–2015, Feirense – 2016–2017
- Sidnei – Marítimo – 2008–2009, 2010–2011, Gil Vicente – 2011–2012
- David Silva – Olhanense – 2012–2013
- Ericson Silva – Vitória de Setúbal – 2014–2015
- Marco Soares – União de Leiria – 2006–2008, 2009–2012, Feirense – 2018–2019, Arouca – 2021–2022
- Sténio – Feirense – 2011–2012
- Stopira – Feirense – 2011–2012
- Cláudio Tavares – Aves – 2019–2020
- David Tavares – Moreirense – 2020–2021, Famalicão – 2021–2023
- Gilson Tavares – Estoril – 2021–2023
- Hélder Tavares – Tondela – 2015–2019, 2025–2026
- **José Tavares** – **Santa Clara** – 2025–
- Tchide – Gil Vicente – 2000–2001
- Toni – Rio Ave – 1990–1992, 1993–1994, Braga – 1992–1993, 1994–2000, Santa Clara – 2000–2002
- Toy – Olhanense – 2004–2005, 2009–2012
- Bruno Varela – Vitória de Setúbal – 2016–2017, Benfica – 2017–2018, Vitória de Guimarães – 2020–2025
- Fernando Varela – Trofense 2008–2009, Feirense – 2011–2012, Casa Pia – 2022–2024
- Hélio Varela – Portimonense – 2023–2024
- José Varela – Aves – 2018–2020
- José Veiga – Benfica – 1995–1996
- Nélson Veiga – Estoril, Vitória de Setúbal, Naval – 1996–2006
- Artur Jorge Vicente – Espinho, Salgueiros, Boavista, União de Leiria, Rio Ave, Farense – 1996–2001
- Vinha – Salgueiros, Porto – 1990–1998
- Zé Luís – Gil Vicente – 2011–2012, Braga – 2012–2013, 2014–2015, Porto – 2019–2021, Farense – 2023–2024, AVS – 2024–2025
- Zé Rui – Belenenses, Vitória de Setúbal – 1993-2000
- Zezinho – União de Leiria – 1997–2003

== Central African Republic ==
- Manassé Enza-Yamissi – Gil Vicente – 2014–2015
- **Hugo Gambor** – **Académico Viseu** – 2026–

== Chad ==
- Marius Mouandilmadji – Porto – 2018–2019, Aves – 2019–2020

== Chile ==
- Mario Cáceres – Sporting CP – 2000–2001
- Esteban Carvajal – Olhanense – 2010–2011
- Nicolás Castillo – Benfica – 2018–2019
- Pablo Contreras – Sporting CP – 2002–2003, Braga – 2007–2008
- Juan Delgado – Tondela – 2017–2019, Paços de Ferreira – 2021–2023
- Alejandro Escalona – Benfica – 2000–2001
- Matías Fernández – Sporting CP – 2009–2012
- Luis Figueroa – Olhanense – 2011–2012
- Felipe Flores Quijada – Boavista – 2004–2005
- David Henríquez – Beira-Mar – 2002–2003
- Manuel Iturra – União de Leiria – 2010–2011
- Braulio Leal – Vitória de Guimarães – 2004–2005
- Igor Lichnovsky – Porto – 2015–2017
- Alejandro Osorio – Beira-Mar – 2003–2004
- Mauricio Pinilla – Sporting CP – 2004–2006
- Simón Ramírez – Belenenses SAD – 2019–2020
- Diego Rubio – Sporting CP – 2011–2013
- Alex Von Schwedler – Marítimo – 2006–2007, Belenenses – 2008–2009
- Cristián Suárez – Olhanense – 2010–2011
- Rodrigo Tello – Sporting CP – 2001–2007
- Cristián Uribe – Benfica – 1999–2001, Moreirense – 2003–2004
- Jaime Valdés – Sporting CP – 2010–2011
- Juan Viveros – Sporting CP – (1999)–2000, Alverca – 2000–2001, União de Leiria – 2002–2003

== China ==
- Zhang Chengdong – União de Leiria – 2010–2011, Beira-Mar – 2011–2012
- Dong Fangzhuo – Portimonense – 2010–2011
- Fernandinho – Estoril – 2014–2015
- Eddy Francis – Boavista – 2016–2017
- Wang Gang – Beira-Mar – 2010–2011
- Tong Le – Aves – 2018–2019
- Wei Shihao – Boavista – 2014–2015

== Colombia ==
- Leonardo Acevedo – Boavista – 2017–2018, Estoril – 2021–2022, Rio Ave – 2022–2024
- Abel Aguilar – Belenenses – 2015–2016
- Néstor Álvarez – Académica – 2006–2007
- Brayan Angulo – Boavista – 2007–2008, Leixões – 2008–2009
- Iván Angulo – Portimonense – 2021–2022
- Wilinton Aponzá – Portimonense – 2021–2023
- Cristian Arango – Aves – 2017–2018, Tondela – 2018–2019
- Santiago Arias – Sporting CP – 2011–2013
- Sebastián Ayala – Nacional – 2014–2015
- Edwin Banguera – Gil Vicente – 2019–2020
- Oscar Barreto – Rio Ave – 2017–2018, Santa Clara – 2021–2022
- Jorge Bermúdez – Benfica – 1996–1997
- Cristian Borja – Sporting CP – 2018–2021, Braga – 2020–2021, 2022–2024
- Rafael Bustamante – Vizela – 2023–2024
- Gian Franco Cabezas – Alverca – 2025–2026
- Juan José Calero – Gil Vicente – 2021–2022
- Cristian Cangá – Boavista – 2015–2016
- Mateo Cassierra – Belenenses SAD – 2019–2022
- **Juan Diego Castillo** – **Vitória de Guimarães** – 2025–
- Guillermo Celis – Benfica – 2016–2017, Vitória de Guimarães – 2016–2019
- Edwin Congo – Vitória de Guimarães – 2000–2001
- Cristian Devenish – Boavista – 2020–2021 Rio Ave – 2023–2024, AVS – 2024–2026
- Luis Díaz – Porto – 2019–2022
- **Jhon Durán** – **Benfica** – 2026–
- Óscar Estupiñán – Vitória de Guimarães – 2017–2019, 2020–2022
- Radamel Falcao – Porto – 2009–2011
- **Simón García** – **Rio Ave** – 2026–
- Pipe Gómez – Santa Clara – 2021–2022
- Yony González – Portimonense – 2022–2023
- Fredy Guarín – Porto – 2008–2012
- Teófilo Gutiérrez – Sporting CP – 2015–2016
- Edwin Herrera – Famalicão – 2020–2021
- Wilmar Jordán – Chaves – 2017–2018
- Jackson Martínez – Porto – 2012–2015, Portimonense – 2018–2020
- Brayan Medina – Tondela – 2025–2026
- Yair Mena – AVS – 2024–2025
- Félix Micolta – Marítimo – 2014–2015
- Juan José Mina – Estrela da Amadora – 2024–2025
- Fredy Montero – Sporting CP – 2013–2016, 2017–2019
- Santiago Montoya – Vitória de Guimarães – 2015–2016
- Diego Moreno – Marítimo – 2019–2020
- Erik Moreno – Braga – 2013–2014, Tondela – 2015–2017
- Marlos Moreno – Portimonense – 2019–2020
- John Mosquera – Gil Vicente – 2013–2014
- Moisés Mosquera – Marítimo – 2021–2023
- **Yeimar Mosquera** – **Vitória de Guimarães** – 2026–
- James Rodríguez – Porto – 2010–2013
- Phil Jackson – Paços de Ferreira – 2006–2007
- Felipe Pardo – Braga – 2013–2015
- Óscar Perea – AVS – 2025–2026
- Ricardo Pérez – Académica – 2003–2004
- **Sebastián Pérez** – Boavista – 2020–2025, **Casa Pia** – 2025–
- Héctor Quiñones – Porto – 2012–2013, Penafiel – 2014–2015, Paços de Ferreira – 2017–2018
- Juan Quintero – Porto – 2013–2019
- Wason Rentería – Porto – 2006–2007, Braga – 2008–2010
- Brayan Riascos – Nacional – 2018–2019, 2020–2021, Marítimo – 2022–2023
- Sebastián Rincón – Vitória de Guimarães – 2017–2019
- **Richard Ríos** – **Benfica** – 2025–
- Yefrei Rodríguez – Tondela – 2025–2026
- Andrés Sarmiento – Vizela – 2021–2023
- **Luis Suárez** – **Sporting CP** – 2025–
- Mateus Uribe – Porto – 2019–2023
- José Valencia – Feirense – 2017–2019
- Renny Vega – União Madeira – 2015–2016
- Jhon Velásquez – Farense – 2023–2025
- Juan Villa – Gil Vicente – 2019–2020
- Alexander Viveros – Boavista – 2002–2004

== Comoros ==
- Iyad Mohamed – Casa Pia – 2024–2026
- Rémy Vita – Tondela – 2025–2026
- Zaydou Youssouf – Famalicão – 2022–2025

== Congo ==
- **Mons Bassouamina** – **Marítimo** – 2026–
- Moké Kajima - Braga – 1995–1996
- Gaius Makouta – Boavista – 2021–2024
- Chris Malonga – Vitória de Guimarães – 2013–2014
- Dylan Saint-Louis – Vizela – 2023–2024

== DR Congo ==
- Simon Banza – Famalicão – 2021–2022, Braga – 2022–2025
- Dylan Batubinsika – Famalicão – 2021–2023
- Yannick Bolasie – Sporting CP – 2019–2020
- Eshele Botende – Marítimo – 1996–1997
- André Bukia – Boavista – 2015–2017, Arouca – 2021–2024
- Anthony D'Alberto – Moreirense – 2018–2021
- Samuel Essende – Vizela – 2023–2024
- Gianelli Imbula – Porto – 2015–2016, Portimonense – 2021–2022
- Arnold Issoko – Vitória de Setúbal – 2015–2018
- Junior Kadile – Famalicão – 2021–2023
- Kabwe Kasongo – Vitória de Guimarães – 1997–1999, Chaves – 1999–2008
- Makalamba Katanga – Vitória de Guimarães – 1996–1997
- Joris Kayembe – Porto – 2013–2014, Arouca – 2014–2015, Rio Ave – 2015–2016
- Yves Kibuey – Académica – 2001–2002, União de Leiria – 2002–2003
- Christian Kinkela – Moreirense – 2012–2013
- Basaula Lemba – Vitória de Guimarães – 1986–1987, 1990–1994, O Elvas – 1987–1988, Belenenses – 1994–1996
- Jason Lokilo – Vizela – 2023–2024
- Kuyangana Makukula – Leixões – 1988–1989, Vitória de Setúbal – 1989–1992, Chaves – 1992–1993
- Mangonga – Gil Vicente – 1989–1995, Tirsense – 1995–1996
- Richard Mapuata – Belenenses – 1986–1988
- David Mbala – Penafiel – 2014–2015, Boavista – 2016–2017
- Chancel Mbemba – Porto – 2018–2022
- Tueba Menayane – Benfica – 1986–1988, Vitória de Setúbal – 1988–1989, Tirsense – 1989–1991, Farense – 1991–1992, Gil Vicente – 1992–1993
- Masena Moke – Gil Vicente – 1997–2000
- Léon Mokuna – Sporting CP – 1954–1956
- Amily N'Dinga – Vitória de Guimarães – 1986–1997
- Monduone N'Kama – Vitória de Guimarães – 1986–1988, Estrela da Amadora – 1988–1989
- Kalombo N'Kongolo – Espinho – 1987–1988, 1989–1993, Porto – 1988–1989
- Etienne N'tsunda – Porto – 1994–1995, Gil Vicente – 1996–1997, Chaves – 1997–1999, Vitória de Guimarães – 1999–2001
- Christopher Oualembo – Académica – 2014–2016
- Charles Pickel – Famalicão – 2021–2022
- Aaron Tshibola – Aves – 2019–2020

== Costa Rica ==
- **Brandon Aguilera** – **Rio Ave** – 2024–
- Joel Campbell – Sporting CP – 2016–2017
- **Kevin Chamorro** – Estoril – 2024–2025, **Rio Ave** – 2025–
- Dylan Flores – Tondela – 2016–2017
- Brandon Poltronieri – Leixões – 2008–2010
- David Ramírez – Moreirense – 2016–2017
- Bryan Ruiz – Sporting CP – 2015–2018
- **Patrick Sequeira** – **Casa Pia** – 2024–
- Rodney Wallace – Arouca – 2015–2016
- Roan Wilson – Gil Vicente – 2022–2024
- **Álvaro Zamora** – **Académico Viseu** – 2026–

== Croatia ==
- Andrija Balajić – Sporting CP – 1996–1997
- Zoran Ban – Belenenses – 1994–1995, Boavista – 1995–1996
- Roko Baturina – Gil Vicente – 2023–2024
- Stojan Belajić – União de Leiria – 1996–1997
- **Toni Borevković** – Rio Ave – 2018–2021, **Vitória de Guimarães** – 2021–2022, 2023–
- Fabijan Buntić – Vizela – 2022–2024
- Darko Butorović – Porto – 1996–1999, Farense – 1999–2000
- Duje Čop – Nacional – 2008–2009
- Goran Čumić – Tirsense – 1994–1997
- Ivan Dolček – Famalicão – 2021–2022
- Antonio Franja – Vitória de Setúbal – 2005–2006
- Nino Galović – Arouca – 2021–2025
- Toni Gorupec – Vitória de Setúbal – 2015–2016
- **Franjo Ivanović** – **Benfica** – 2025–
- Tomislav Ivković – Sporting CP – 1989–1993, Estoril – (1993)–1994, Vitória de Setúbal – 1993–(1994), Belenenses – 1994–1996, Estrela da Amadora – 1997–1998
- Nikola Jambor – Rio Ave – 2018–2021, Moreirense – 2021–2022
- **Roko Jurišić** – **Estoril** – 2026–
- Branimir Kalaica – Benfica – 2016–2017
- Mladen Karoglan – Chaves – 1991–1993, Braga – 1993–1999
- Siniša Končalović – Estrela da Amadora – 1994–1995
- Filip Krovinović – Rio Ave – 2015–2017, Benfica – 2017–2019
- Petar Krpan – Sporting CP – 1998–1999, União de Leiria – 1999–2001, 2004–2005
- Marin Lalić – Salgueiros – 1992–1995
- Andrej Lukić – Braga – 2017–2018
- **Ivan Mandić** – **Casa Pia** – 2026–
- Silvio Marić – Porto – 2000–2001
- Ivica Matić – Chaves – 1997–2000
- Dejan Mezga – Nacional – 2016–2017
- Vatroslav Mihačić – Gil Vicente – 1995–1999
- Mato Miloš – Aves – 2018–2020
- Branko Miljuš – Vitória de Setúbal – 1990–1992
- Josip Mišić – Sporting CP – 2017–2019
- Petar Musa – Boavista – 2021–2022, Benfica – 2022–2024
- Mirsad Omerhodžić – Chaves – 1992–1993
- Renato Pantalon – Rio Ave – 2022–2025, Estrela da Amadora – 2024–2025
- Kristijan Pavlović – Nacional – 2008–2010
- Alen Petrović – Belenenses – 1994–1995
- Danijel Pranjić – Sporting CP – 2012–2013
- **Dominik Prpić** – **Porto** – 2025–
- Ivan Pudar – Boavista – 1991–1993
- Denis Putnik – Chaves – 1996–1998
- Rudi – Chaves – 1989–1992, Paços de Ferreira – 1992–1994
- **Gabriel Rukavina** – **Arouca** – 2026–
- Anthony Šerić – Olhanense – 2013–2014
- Andrej Šimunec – Aves – 2019–2020
- Dejan Školnik – Nacional – 2010–2013
- Tomo Šokota – Benfica – 2001–2005, Porto – 2005–2007
- Robert Špehar – Sporting CP – 1999–2001
- **Dario Špikić** – **Rio Ave** – 2025–
- Mario Stanić – Benfica – 1994–1995
- Danijel Stojanović – Nacional – 2010–2012
- Tomislav Štrkalj – Tondela – 2019–2021
- Mario Vojković – Chaves – 1996–1998
- **Leonardo Vonić** – **Moreirense** – 2026–
- Josip Vuković – Marítimo – 2018–2020
- Miroslav Žitnjak – União de Leiria – 1995–2000
- **Lovro Zvonarek** – **Estrela da Amadora** – 2026–

== Cuba ==
- Jorge Aguirre – Gil Vicente – 2024–2025

== Curaçao ==
- Jeremy Antonisse – Moreirense – 2023–2025
- Kenji Gorré – Nacional – (2018)–2019, 2020–2021, Boavista – 2021–2023
- Gevaro Nepomuceno – Marítimo – 2015–2017
- Xander Severina – Casa Pia – 2025–2026
- Nigel Thomas – Paços de Ferreira – 2022–2023, Nacional – 2024–2025

== Cyprus ==
- **Stelios Andreou** – **Estoril** – 2026–
- Anderson Correia – Boavista – 2014–2017
- Marcus Edwards – Vitória de Guimarães – 2019–2022, Sporting CP – 2021–2025
- **Stavros Gavriil** – **Nacional** – 2026–
- Andreas Karo – Marítimo – 2020–2021
- Charalampos Kyriakou – Estoril – 2017–2018
- Valentin Roberge – Marítimo – 2010–2013

== Czech Republic ==
- **Jakub Brabec** – **Rio Ave** – 2025–
- Lukáš Horníček – Braga – 2021–2023, 2024–2026
- Pavel Horváth – Sporting CP – 2000–2001
- David Jurásek – Benfica – 2023–2024
- Václav Mrkvička – Braga – 2000–2001
- Karel Poborský – Benfica – 1998–2000
- Václav Sejk – Famalicão – 2024–2025
- Tomáš Skuhravý – Sporting CP – 1995–1996
- Pavel Srníček – Beira-Mar – 2004–2006
- Matouš Trmal – Vitória de Guimarães – 2020–2022, Marítimo – 2022–2023
- Tomáš Vaclík – Boavista – 2024–2025
- Lubomír Vlk – Porto – 1990–1993 (Czechoslovakia INT)

== Denmark ==
- **Silas Andersen** – **Sporting CP** – 2026–
- **Alexander Bah** – **Benfica** – 2022–
- **Victor Froholdt** – **Porto** – 2025–
- Conrad Harder – Sporting CP – 2024–2026
- Morten Hjulmand – Sporting CP – 2023–2026
- **Markus Jensen** – **Nacional** – 2026–
- Per Krøldrup – Olhanense – 2013–2014
- **Andreas Lausen** – **Gil Vicente** – 2026–
- Michael Manniche – Benfica – 1983–1987
- Jan Sørensen – Portimonense – 1987–1989
- Peter Schmeichel – Sporting CP – 1999–2001
- Sebastian Svärd – Vitória de Guimarães – 2005–2006
- Casper Tengstedt – Benfica – 2022–2024
- **Jonas Wind** – **Braga** – 2026–
- Frederik Winther – Estoril – 2023–2024
- Sammy Youssouf – Marítimo – (2005)–2006

== Dominican Republic ==
- **Pablo Rosario** – **Porto** – 2025–

== Ecuador ==
- Vinicio Angulo – Paços de Ferreira – 2012–2013
- Felipe Caicedo – Sporting CP – 2009–2010
- Leonardo Campana – Famalicão – 2020–2021
- Ronie Carrillo – Portimonense – 2023–2024
- José Cevallos – Portimonense – 2019–2020
- Marlon de Jesús – Arouca – 2016–2017
- **Daniel de la Cruz** – **Nacional** – 2026–
- Erick Ferigra – Paços de Ferreira – 2022–2023
- Iván Kaviedes – Porto – 2001–2002
- John Mercado – AVS – 2024–2025
- **Allen Obando** – **Nacional** – 2026–
- Gonzalo Plata – Sporting CP – 2019–2021
- Jackson Porozo – Boavista – 2020–2022
- **Leonardo Realpe** – **Famalicão** – 2024–
- Juan Rodríguez – Tondela – 2025–2026

== Egypt ==
- Magdi Abdelghani – Beira-Mar – 1988–1991
- Mahmoud Ezzat – Nacional – 2014–2015
- Ali Fathy – Nacional – 2014–2015
- Omar Fayed – Arouca – 2025–2026
- Ali Ghazal – Nacional – 2012–2017, Feirense – 2018–2019
- Saleh Gomaa – Nacional – 2013–2015
- Ahmed Hassan – Rio Ave – 2012–2016, 2024–2025, Braga – 2015–2018, 2019–2020
- Hossam Hassan – Gil Vicente – 2014–2015
- Mohamed Ibrahim – Marítimo – 2014–2015
- Mahmoud Kahraba – Aves – 2019–2020
- Bilal Mazhar – Estrela da Amadora – 2024–2025
- Marwan Mohsen – Gil Vicente – 2014–2015
- Abdel Sattar Sabry – Benfica – 2000–2001, Marítimo – 2002–2003, Estrela da Amadora – 2003–2004
- Ahmed Sayed – Nacional – 2016–2017, Moreirense – 2017–2018
- Shikabala – Sporting CP – 2013–2014

== El Salvador ==
- Arturo Álvarez – Paços de Ferreira – 2011–2013
- Nelson Bonilla – Nacional – 2016–2017
- Denis Pineda – Santa Clara – 2018–2020

== England ==
- **Nelson Abbey** – **Rio Ave** – 2024–
- Dennis Adeniran – Portimonense – 2023–2024
- **Samuel Amissah** – **Estoril** – 2026–
- Arvin Appiah – Nacional – 2024–2025
- Gary Charles – Benfica – 1998–(1999)
- Eric Dier – Sporting CP – 2012–2014
- Brian Deane – Benfica – 1997–1999
- **Jesse Derry** – **Sporting CP** – 2026–
- Khayon Edwards – Estoril – 2025–2026
- Angel Gomes – Boavista – 2020–2021
- **Jimi Gower** – **Moreirense** – 2025–
- Andre Green – AVS – 2025–2026
- Steve Harkness – Benfica – 1998–(1999)
- **Mofe Jemide** – **Alverca** – 2026–
- **Nile John** – **Moreirense** – 2025–
- Matt Jones – Belenenses – 2013–2015, Tondela – 2015–2016
- Jacob Maddox – Vitória de Guimarães – 2020–2021
- Raphael Meade – Sporting CP 1985–1988
- Scott Minto – Benfica – 1997–1999
- Phil Murphy – Nacional – 1982–1984, 1985–1986, 1987–1990
- Paul Murray – Beira-Mar – 2004–2006
- Tashan Oakley-Boothe – Estrela da Amadora – 2023–2024
- Tope Obadeyi – Rio Ave – 2012–2013
- Jonathan Panzo – Rio Ave – 2024–2026
- John Richards – Marítimo – 1983–1985
- Omar Richards – Rio Ave – 2024–2026
- Tony Sealy – Sporting CP – 1987–1988, Braga – (1988)–1989
- Michael Thomas – Benfica – 1998–2000
- Josh Tymon – Famalicão – 2019–2020
- Phil Walker – Boavista – 1984–1991

== Equatorial Guinea ==
- Luis Asué – Moreirense – 2023–2025
- Javi Balboa – Benfica – 2008–2009, Beira-Mar – 2011–2013, Estoril – 2013–2015
- André Neles – Marítimo – 2003-2004

== Estonia ==
- Vjatšeslav Zahovaiko – União de Leiria – 2009–2011

== Finland ==
- Otso Liimatta – Famalicão – 2023–2025
- Jari Rantanen – Estoril Praia – 1983–84
- Kimmo Tarkkio – Chaves – 1992–93

== France ==
- Hassan Ahamada – Beira-Mar – 2004–(2005), Belenenses – 2005–2006
- Makan Aïko – Tondela – 2025–2026
- Baptiste Aloé – Arouca – 2021–2022
- Bilel Aouacheria – Moreirense – 2017–2020, Farense – 2020–2021, Gil Vicente – 2021–2023
- Alvin Arrondel – Vitória de Guimarães – 2015–2016
- Jason Bahamboula – Vitória de Guimarães – 2022–2023
- Franck-Yves Bambock – Marítimo – 2019–2021
- Sékou Baradji – Naval – 2008–2010
- **Steven Baseya** – **Alverca** – 2025–
- Amadou Ba-Sy – Vizela – 2023–2024
- Fahem Benaïssa-Yahia – Casa Pia – 2023–2026
- Kelly Berville – Penafiel – 2005–2008, Paços de Ferreira – 2008–2010
- Quentin Beunardeau – Aves – 2018–2020, Gil Vicente – 2020–2021
- Guillaume Boronad – Penafiel – 2005–2006
- Selim Bouadla – Académica – 2015–2016
- Chahreddine Boukholda – Belenenses SAD – 2019–2020
- Bédi Buval – Feirense – 2011–2012, Académica – 2013–2014, Paços de Ferreira – 2013–2014
- **Oumar Camara** – **Vitória de Guimarães** – 2025–
- **Axel Camblan** – **Estoril** – 2026–
- Lionel Carole – Benfica – 2010–2011
- Ghislain Chauray – Vitória de Guimarães – 2002–2003
- Aly Cissokho – Vitória de Setúbal – (2008)–2009, Porto – 2008–(2009), 2015–2016
- Till Cissokho – Estrela da Amadora – 2024–2025
- Mathis Clairicia – Alverca – 2025–2026
- Aurélien Collin – Vitória de Setúbal – 2009–2011
- Sébastien Corchia – Benfica – 2018–2019
- **Anthony Correia** – **Académico Viseu** – 2026–
- Jean-Christophe Coubronne – Olhanense – 2013–2014
- Julien Dacosta – Portimonense – 2021–2022
- Florian Danho – Famalicão – 2023–2024
- Thomas Debenest – Beira-Mar – 2002–2004
- Shaquil Delos – Estoril – 2022–2023
- Siramana Dembélé – Vitória de Setúbal – (2005)–2006
- Mohamed Diaby – Paços de Ferreira – 2019–2022, Portimonense – 2022–2023
- Mamadou Diawara – Belenenses – 2013–2014
- **Naïs Djouahra** – **Arouca** – 2025–
- Manuel dos Santos – Benfica – 2004–2006
- Ousmane Dramé – Moreirense – 2016–2018, Belenenses SAD – 2018–2019
- Johann Duveau – Marítimo – 1998–2000
- Dylan Duventru – Marítimo – 2009–2011
- Vincent Dyduch – Académica – 2000–2004
- **Marvin Elimbi** – **Gil Vicente** – 2024–
- Simon Elisor – Famalicão – 2024–2026
- Yvan Erichot – União de Leiria – 2011–2012
- Jean-Jacques Eydelie – Benfica – 1994–1995
- Imad Faraj – Belenenses SAD – 2019–2020
- François-Xavier Fumu Tamuzo – Marítimo – 2020–2021
- Damien Furtado – Rio Ave – 2018–2019
- Nicolas Godemèche – Naval – 2007–2011
- Kévin Gomis – Naval – 2009–2011
- **Jean-Baptiste Gorby** – **Braga** – 2021–2023, 2024–
- Prince-Désir Gouano – Rio Ave – 2014–2015, Vitória de Guimarães – 2016–2017
- Grégory – Gil Vicente – 2004–2006, Marítimo – 2006–2008, Vitória de Guimarães – 2008–2009, Paços de Ferreira – 2013–2014
- Florent Hanin – Moreirense – 2012–2013, Belenenses – 2016–2018, Vitória de Guimarães – 2018–2020
- Alexandre Hauw – Naval – 2008–2011
- **Mathis Jangéal** – **Famalicão** – 2026–
- Nicolas Janvier – Vitória de Guimarães – 2020–2023
- **Antoine Joujou** – **Famalicão** – 2025–
- Issiaka Kamate – AVS – 2024–2025
- **Yann Karamoh** – **Porto** – 2025–
- Mehdi Kerrouche – Naval – 2009–2010
- Hamidou Keyta – Santa Clara – 2021–2022
- Koba Koindredi – Estoril – 2023–2024, Sporting CP – 2023–2024
- **William Kokolo** – **Nacional** – 2026–
- Vincent Koziello – Nacional – 2020–2021
- Layvin Kurzawa – Boavista – 2024–2025
- Grégory Lacombe – Vitória de Setúbal – 2005–2006
- Tom Lacoux – Famalicão – 2023–2024
- Didier Lang – Sporting CP – 1997–1998
- Antoine Leautey – Gil Vicente – 2020–2022
- **Clément Lenglet** – **Benfica** – 2026–
- **Jérémy Livolant** – **Casa Pia** – 2024–
- **Julien Lomboto** – **Rio Ave** – 2022–2024, 2025–
- Tripy Makonda – Académica – 2014–2016
- Eliaquim Mangala – Porto – 2011–2014, Estoril – 2023–2025
- Jérémy Mathieu – Sporting CP – 2017–2020
- Stéphane Maurel – Estoril – 2004–2005
- **Evans Maurin** – **Casa Pia** – 2026–
- **Fally Mayulu** – **Arouca** – 2025–
- Soualiho Meïté – Benfica – 2021–2022
- Mehdi Merghem – Farense – 2024–2025
- **Bastien Meupiyou** – **Alverca** – 2025–
- Cédric Moukouri – Marítimo – 2006–2008
- **Tom Moustier** – **Estrela da Amadora** – 2025–
- **Jonathan Mutombo** – **Gil Vicente** – 2024–
- Kélian Nsona – Casa Pia – 2025–2026
- Bourama N'Golo Ouattara – Naval – 2009–2010
- Amine Oudrhiri – Farense – 2020–2021, Rio Ave – 2022–2025, Estrela da Amadora – 2024–2025
- Stéphane Paille – Porto – 1990–1991
- Jérôme Palatsi – Beira-Mar – 1996–2001, Vitória de Guimarães – 2001–2005
- Nicolas Paviot – Alverca – 2000–2004
- Romuald Peiser – Naval – 2008–2010, Académica – 2010–2012
- Olivier Pickeu – Varzim – 2001–2002
- Damien Plessis – Marítimo – 2015–2016
- Denis-Will Poha – Vitória de Guimarães – 2019–2021, Portimonense – 2020–2021
- Robin Previtali – Naval – 2010–2011
- William Quevedo – Boavista – 1997–2002
- Laurent Quievreux – União de Leiria – 2003–2006
- Adil Rami – Boavista – 2020–2021
- Laurent Robert – Benfica – 2005–(2006)
- Gérard Roland – Varzim – 2001–2002
- Raphael Roncen – Estoril – 2004–2005
- Loreintz Rosier – Estoril – 2021–2023
- Valentin Rosier – Sporting CP – 2019–2020
- Mabrouk Rouaï – Nacional – 2020–2021, Estoril – 2022–2023
- Baptiste Roux – AVS – 2024–2025
- Romain Salin – Naval – 2010–2011, Marítimo – 2011–2016, Rio Ave – 2013–2014, Sporting CP – 2018–2019
- Sylvain Sansone – Felgueiras – 1995–1996, Vitória de Setúbal – 1996–1997
- Malang Sarr – Porto – 2020–2021
- Mouhamadou-Naby Sarr – Sporting CP – 2014–2015
- Vincent Sasso – Beira-Mar – 2012–2013, Braga – 2012–2015, Belenenses – 2017–2018, Belenenses SAD – 2018–2019, Boavista – 2022–2024
- Billal Sebaihi – Estoril – 2015–2016
- **Malik Sellouki** – **Rio Ave** – 2026–
- **Ahmed Sidibé** – **Vitória de Guimarães** – 2026–
- Florent Sinama Pongolle – Sporting CP – 2009–2010
- Jérémy Sopalski – Naval – 2004–2005
- **Beni Souza** – **Estrela da Amadora** – 2026–
- Stéphane Sparagna – Boavista – 2017–2019
- Harouna Sy – Estoril – 2023–2024
- Alassane També – Tondela – 2016–2017
- Aboubacar Tandia – Naval – 2009–2010
- Steven Thicot – Belenenses – 2014–2015, Tondela – 2015–2016
- Damien Tixier – Naval – 2000–2002, Académica Coimbra – 2002–2005, União de Leiria – 2005–2007
- Alioune Touré – União de Leiria – 2005–2007
- **Tidjany Touré** – **Gil Vicente** – 2023–
- Fabien Valéri – Naval – 2000–2002, Académica Coimbra – 2002–2003
- Lenny Vallier – Nacional – 2025–2026
- **Emerson Vanga** – **Estrela da Amadora** – 2026–
- Patrick Videira – Chaves – 1996–1997
- Arthur Yamga – Aves – 2019–2020
- Yannick – Alverca – 2001–2004, Estoril – 2004–(2005)
- Enzo Zidane – Aves – 2019–2020
- Nassim Zitouni – Vitória de Guimarães – 2014–2015

== Gabon ==
- Henry Antchouet – Belenenses – 2002–2005, Vitória de Guimarães – 2005–(2006)
- Aaron Appindangoyé – Boavista – 2014–2015
- Etienne Bito'o – Gil Vicente – 2002–2004
- Malick Evouna – Santa Clara – 2018–2020
- Yannick Larry – Gil Vicente – 2002–2004
- Théodore Nzue Nguema – Braga – 1999–2001
- Parfait Ndong – Chaves – 1996–1998
- Randal Oto'o – Tondela – 2015–2016
- Merlin Tandjigora – Belenenses – 2017–2018

== Gambia ==
- **Yaya Bojang** – **Alverca** – 2026–
- **Alassana Jatta** – **Casa Pia** – 2026–
- Musa Juwara – Boavista – 2020–2021
- Yusupha Njie – Boavista – 2017–2023, Farense – 2024–2025

== Georgia ==
- Giorgi Aburjania – Gil Vicente – 2021–2023, AVS – 2024–2025
- Giorgi Arabidze – Nacional – 2018–2019
- Avtandil Ebralidze – Gil Vicente – 2013–2015, Chaves – 2018–2019, Nacional – 2018–2019
- Jorge Karseladze – Rio Ave – 2022–2023, 2024–2025
- Giorgi Kochorashvili – Sporting CP – 2025–2026
- Gocha Kokoshvili – Belenenses – 1997–1998
- **Nodar Lominadze** – **Estoril** – 2025–
- Giorgi Makaridze – Moreirense – 2016–2017, Vitória de Setúbal – 2018–2020, Marítimo – 2022–2023
- **Otar Mamageishvili** – **Famalicão** – 2024–

== Germany ==
- Elias Abouchabaka – Vitória de Guimarães – 2019–2020
- **Bright Arrey-Mbi** – **Braga** – 2024–
- **Samuel Bamba** – **Marítimo** – 2026–
- Patrick Bauer – Marítimo – 2013–2015
- Jan-Niklas Beste – Benfica – 2024–2025
- **Maurice Boakye** – **Marítimo** – 2026–
- Hans-Jörg Butt – Benfica – 2007–2008
- Jonas Carls – Vitória de Guimarães – 2020–2021
- Eric da Silva Moreira – Rio Ave – 2025–2026
- Julian Draxler – Benfica – 2022–2023
- Robert Enke – Benfica – 1999–2002
- Dennis – Estrela da Amadora – 2002–2004
- Maximilian Haas – União de Leiria – 2011–2012, Braga – 2012–2013
- Timo Hildebrand – Sporting CP – 2010–2011
- Nico Mantl – Arouca – 2024–2026
- **Soufiane Messeguem** – **Académico Viseu** – 2026–
- Hany Mukhtar – Benfica – 2014–2015
- Ole Pohlmann – Rio Ave – 2024–2026
- Lukas Raeder – Vitória de Setúbal – 2014–2016
- Dominic Reinold – Beira-Mar – 2011–2012
- **Max Scholze** – **Estrela da Amadora** – 2025–
- Luca Waldschmidt – Benfica – 2020–2022
- Julian Weigl – Benfica – 2019–2023

== Ghana ==
- Issah Abass – Chaves – 2022–2024
- **Sabit Abdulai** – **Alverca** – 2025–
- Yaw Ackah – Boavista – 2018–2020
- Joe Addo – Belenenses – 1997–1998
- David Addy – Académica – 2010–2011, Vitória de Guimarães – 2012–2014
- Lumor Agbenyenu – Portimonense – 2017–2018, Sporting CP – 2017–2019
- Augustine Ahinful – União de Leiria – (1998)–1999,(2000)–2001, Boavista – 1999–2000
- Joseph Amoah – Vitória de Guimarães – 2014–2015, 2016–2020
- Christian Atsu – Rio Ave – 2011–2012, Porto – 2012–2013
- Abdul Awudu – Vizela – 2023–2024
- Kwame Ayew – União de Leiria – 1995–1996, Vitória de Setúbal – 1996–1997, 2006–2007, Boavista – 1997–1999, Sporting CP – 1999–2000
- Emmanuel Boateng – Rio Ave – 2014–2015, 2022–2024, Moreirense – 2015–2018
- Kelvin Boateng – Aves – 2019–2020
- Francis Cann – Vizela – 2021–2023
- Semeu Commey – Estrela da Amadora – 2024–2025
- Haminu Draman – Gil Vicente – 2013–2014
- Emmanuel Duah – União de Leiria – 1997–2002, Gil Vicente – 2002–2004
- Mark Edusei – União de Leiria – 1997–1998, 1999–2000
- Abdul Fatawu – Sporting CP – 2022–2023
- Caleb Gomina – Moreirense – 2014–2016
- Abdul Ibrahim – Famalicão – 2020–2022
- Samuel Inkoom – Boavista – 2015–2016
- Maxwell Konadu – União de Leiria – 1997–1999
- Nii Lamptey – União de Leiria – 1998–1999
- Bernard Mensah – Vitória de Guimarães – 2014–2015, 2016–2017
- Gideon Mensah – Vitória de Guimarães – 2020–2021
- Yaw Moses – Arouca – 2022–2024
- Abdul Mumin – Vitória de Guimarães – 2020–2022
- Sulley Muniru – Tondela – 2017–2018
- Massaudu Naddah – Desportivo das Aves – 1998–2002, Chaves – 1999–(2000)
- Samuel Obeng – Casa Pia – 2024–2025
- **Lawrence Ofori** – Feirense – 2018–2019, Famalicão – 2019–2020, 2021–2022, Moreirense – 2023–2026, **Casa Pia** – 2025–
- Richard Ofori – Académica – 2014–2016, Vizela – 2021–2022
- Ernest Ohemeng – Rio Ave – 2013–2014, Moreirense – 2015–2018
- Jerome Opoku – Arouca – 2022–2024
- Barnes Osei – Paços de Ferreira – 2013–2017
- Quincy Owusu-Abeyie – Boavista – 2014–2015
- Moses Sakyi – Estoril – 2004–2006, Estrela da Amadora – 2006–2008
- William Tiero – Vitória de Guimarães – 2005–2006, Naval – 2006–2007, Académica – 2007–2010, Olhanense – 2010–2011, Gil Vicente – 2012–2013
- Alhassan Wakaso – Portimonense – 2010–2011, Rio Ave – 2013–2017, Vitória de Guimarães – 2017–2019, 2020–2021
- Abdul Majeed Waris – Porto – 2017–2018
- Abdul-Aziz Yakubu – Vitória de Guimarães – 2018–2019, Rio Ave – 2022–2024
- Ishmael Yartey – Beira-Mar – 2010–2011

== Greece ==
- Sotiris Alexandropoulos – Sporting CP – 2022–2023
- Nikos Athanasiou – Rio Ave – 2025–2026
- Theofanis Bakoulas – Rio Ave – 2024–2026
- Panagiotis Fyssas – Benfica – 2003–2005
- **Fotis Ioannidis** – **Sporting CP** – 2025–
- Georgios Karagounis – Benfica – 2005–2007
- Anastasios Karamanos – Feirense – 2016–2018, Rio Ave – 2017–2018
- Kostas Katsouranis – Benfica – 2006–2009
- **Georgios Koutsias** – **Famalicão** – 2026–
- **Georgios Liavas** – **Rio Ave** – 2025–
- Dimitris Nalitzis – Sporting CP – 2001–(2002)
- Giourkas Seitaridis – Porto – 2004–2005
- Vangelis Mantzios – Marítimo – 2010–2011
- Christos Melissis - Marítimo – 2010
- **Nikos Michelis** – **Académico Viseu** – 2026–
- Kostas Mitroglou – Benfica – 2015–2017
- **Andreas Ntoi** – **Rio Ave** – 2024–
- Antonis Papakanellos – Rio Ave – 2025–2026
- **Vangelis Pavlidis** – **Benfica** – 2024–
- Dimitrios Pelkas – Vitória de Setúbal – 2014–2015
- Andreas Samaris – Benfica – 2014–2021, Rio Ave – 2022–2023
- Machairidis Triantafyllos – Benfica – (1999)–2000
- **Georgios Vagiannidis** – **Sporting CP** – 2025–
- Odysseas Vlachodimos – Benfica – 2018–2024
- **Marios Vrousai** – **Rio Ave** – 2023–
- Zeca – Vitória de Setúbal – 2010–2011

== Guadeloupe ==
- Cédric Collet – Beira-Mar – 2012–2013
- Cédrick Fiston – Académica – 2003–2004
- David Fleurival – Boavista – 2007–2008, Beira-Mar – 2012–2013
- Jean Pierre – Naval, Gil Vicente – 1998–2001
- Ulick Lupède – Naval – 2009–2011

== Guinea ==
- Sambégou Bangoura – Boavista – (2007)–2008
- Ibrahima Camará – Moreirense – 2018–2022, Boavista – 2022–2025
- Tafsir Chérif – Rio Ave – 2016–2017
- Salim Cissé – Académica – 2012–2013, 2014–2015, Arouca – 2013–2014, Vitória de Setúbal – 2015–2016
- Boubacar Fofana – Nacional – 2014–2016, Moreirense – 2017–2018
- Alhassane Keita – Marítimo – 2016–2017, Belenenses SAD – 2018–2020
- Abdoul Salam Sow – Belenenses – 1997–1998
- Morlaye Sylla – Arouca – 2022–2025

== Guinea-Bissau ==
- Adilson – Nacional – 2002–2003, 2006–2007
- Alberto – Benfica, Boavista, Belenenses –
- Adul Baldé – Estrela da Amadora – 2006–2008, Vitória de Setúbal – 2009–2010
- Aldair Baldé – Penafiel – 2014–2015
- Amido Baldé – Vitória de Guimarães – 2012–2013, Marítimo – 2016–2017, Tondela – 2016–2017
- Bacar Baldé – Paços de Ferreira – 2011–2012
- Elves Baldé – Farense – 2023–2025
- Mama Baldé – Aves – 2017–2019
- Romário Baldé – Tondela – 2015–2016, Gil Vicente – 2019–2020
- Sadjó Baldé – Nacional – 1999–2000, Gil Vicente – 2000–2001
- Zidane Banjaqui – Aves – 2019–2020
- **Gilberto Batista** – **Moreirense** – 2023–
- Beto – Portimonense – 2019–2022
- Celton Biai – Vitória de Guimarães – 2022–2023
- Biri – SC Covilhã – 1987–1988
- Mamadou Bobó – Porto – 1981–1984, Vitória de Guimarães – 1985–1986, Marítimo – 1986–1988, Estrela da Amadora – 1988–1990, Boavista – 1990–1997
- Braíma – Gil Vicente – 2002–2006
- Burá – Farense – 2020–2021
- Abel Camará – Beira-Mar – 2011–2013, Belenenses – 2014–2017, Belenenses SAD – 2021–2022
- Fali Candé – Portimonense – 2019–2022
- Mamadu Candé – Tondela – 2016–2017, Santa Clara – 2018–2020
- Eliseu Cassamá – Rio Ave – 2016–2019
- Ivanildo Cassamá – Porto – 2004–2006, União de Leiria – 2006–2007, Portimonense – 2010–2011, Olhanense – 2011–2013, Académica – 2007–2008, 2013–2016
- Midana Cassamá – Portimonense – 2023–2024
- Idelino Colubali – Boavista – 2016–2017
- **Juvenal Correia** – **Famalicão** – 2026–
- **Flinto Costa** – **Braga** – 2026–
- Augusto Dabó – Boavista – 2022–2023, 2024–2025
- Tomás Dabó – Braga – 2013–2014, Arouca – 2014–2016
- Dálcio – Belenenses – 2014–2016, Belenenses SAD – 2018–2019
- Marcelo Djaló – Boavista – 2021–2022
- Inzaghi Donígio – Vitória de Setúbal – 2006–2007
- Dú – Santa Clara – 1987–1988, 1998–2003, Estoril – 1991–1994
- Ednilson – Benfica – 2000–2003, Vitória de Guimarães – 2003–2004
- **Jefferson Encada** – Vitória de Guimarães – 2019–2020, **Estrela da Amadora** – 2025–
- Eridson – Paços de Ferreira – 2011–2012
- Evaldo – Vitória de Guimarães – 1996–2001
- Ença Fati – Moreirense – 2014–2018
- Bruno Fernandes – Belenenses – 2000–2003, Desportivo das Aves – (2004)–2005, 2006–2007
- Gerso Fernandes – Estoril – 2012–2014, 2015–2016, Moreirense – 2014–2015, Belenenses – 2016–2017
- Rachide Forbes – Vitória de Setúbal – 2014–2015
- Forbs – Sporting CP – 1984–1986, 1988–1989, Boavista – 1989–1990, Braga – 1990–1995
- Nito Gomes – Marítimo – 2022–2023
- Sana Gomes – Portimonense – 2021–2022
- Esmaël Gonçalves – Rio Ave – 2012–2013, 2014–2015
- Ibraima Baldé – Estrela da Amadora – 2003–2004
- Ido – União de Leiria – 1998–1999
- Edgar Ié – Belenenses – 2016–2017
- João Jaquité – Tondela – 2015–2017, 2018–2021
- Jardel – Vizela – 2023–2024
- João Mário – Chaves – 2016–2017
- João Pedro – Vitória de Guimarães – 2019–2020, Paços de Ferreira – 2020–2022
- Jorginho – Arouca – 2015–2017, Chaves – 2017–2018
- Lino – Varzim – 1995–1998, Marítimo – 1998–2003
- Lopes – Leça – 1995–1996, Espinho – 1996–(1997)
- Malá – Belenenses – 1997–1998, Beira-Mar – 2003–2005
- Carlos Mané – Sporting CP – 2013–2019, Rio Ave – 2019–2021
- Sori Mané – Moreirense – 2019–2022
- **Claudio Mendes** – **Casa Pia** – 2025–
- Edmilson Mendes – Paços de Ferreira – 2021–2022
- Jonas Mendes – Beira-Mar – 2011–2012
- Frédéric Mendy – Estoril – 2012–2013, 2015–2016, Vitória de Setúbal – 2018–2019
- **Tamble Monteiro** – Portimonense – 2023–2024, **Rio Ave** – 2025–
- Almani Moreira – Boavista – 1999–2001, Desportivo das Aves – 2006–2007
- Nando – Vitória de Setúbal – 1995–1997, 1998–1999
- Nanu – Marítimo – 2017–2021, Porto – 2020–2021, Santa Clara – 2022–2023, Estrela da Amadora – 2023–2024
- Renato Nhaga – Casa Pia – 2024–2026
- **Fodé Pascoal** – **Braga** – 2025–
- Pelé – Belenenses – 2008–2010, 2014–2015, Olhanense – 2013–2014, Paços de Ferreira – 2015–2016, Feirense – 2016–2017, Rio Ave – 2017–2018, 2020–2021, Famalicão – 2022–2023
- Petit – Salgueiros – 2001–2002
- Piqueti – Braga – 2013–2014, Gil Vicente – 2014–2015, Marítimo – 2017–2018
- Madi Queta – Farense – 2020–2021
- **Víctor Rofino** – **Famalicão** – 2026–
- Leocísio Sami – Marítimo – 2009–2014, Braga – 2014–2015, Vitória de Guimarães – 2014–2015, Arouca – 2016–2017, Aves – 2017–2018
- Sanã – Boavista – (2002)–2003
- Alfa Semedo – Moreirense – 2017–2018, Benfica – 2018–2019, Vitória de Guimarães – 2021–2023
- Cícero Semedo – Braga – 2003–2004, Vitória de Guimarães – 2008–2009, Rio Ave – 2010–2011, Paços de Ferreira – 2012–2013, 2014–2017
- Serifo – Leça – 1987–2004
- Toni Silva – União Madeira – 2015–(2016)
- Sufrim Lopes – Naval – 2001–2008
- Tavares – Boavista – 1994–1996,(1998)–1999, Penafiel – 1996–1997, 2000–2001, Gil Vicente – 1998–2001
- Valdu Té – Vitória de Setúbal – 2018–2019
- Vando Félix – Vitória de Guimarães – 2024–2026
- Pavel Vieira – Olhanense – 2010–2011
- Zé Turbo – Tondela – 2016–2017
- Zezinho – Sporting CP – 2012–2013

== Haiti ==
- Jean Alcénat – Leixões – 2008–2010, Rio Ave – 2011–2012, Feirense – 2016–2018
- Carnejy Antoine – Casa Pia – 2022–2023
- Yves Desmarets – Vitória de Guimarães – 2007–2010

== Honduras ==
- José Cardona – Lusit. Évora – 1957–1958
- Justo Wilfred Garcia – Lusit. Évora – 1957–1959
- Brayan Beckeles – Boavista – 2014–2015
- Jorge Benguché – Boavista – 2020–2021
- Rubilio Castillo – Tondela – 2019–2020
- Wesly Decas – Nacional – 2018–2019
- Alberth Elis – Boavista – 2020–2021
- Jona – Vitória de Guimarães – 2012–2013
- **Julián Martínez** – **Alverca** – 2025–
- Bryan Róchez – Nacional – 2017–2019, 2020–2021, Portimonense – 2022–2023
- David Suazo – Benfica – 2008–2009
- Jonathan Toro – Tondela – 2019–2020

== Hungary ==
- Gergely Bobál – Nacional – 2020–2021
- Ákos Buzsáky – Porto – 2002–2003, Académica de Coimbra – 2003–2004
- Attila Dragóner – Vitória de Guimarães – 2004–2006
- Miklós Fehér – Porto – 1998–2000, Salgueiros – 1999–(2000), Braga – 2000–2001, Benfica – 2002–2004
- Miklós Gaál – Marítimo – (2005)–2006
- Szabolcs Gyánó – Académica – 2006–2008
- Ferenc Hamori – Marítimo – 1995–(1996)
- Péter Lipcsei – Porto – 1995–1996, Espinho – 1996–1997
- Ferenc Mészáros – Sporting CP – 1981–1983, Farense – 1983–1984, Vitória de Setúbal – 1986–1989
- **Tamás Nikitscher** – **Rio Ave** – 2025–
- **Gábor Szalai** – **Marítimo** – 2026–
- Lázár Szentes – Vitória de Setúbal – 1987–1988
- **Tamás Szűcs** – **Famalicão** – 2026–
- Gábor Vayer – Santa Clara – 2001–2005
- István Vincze – Campomaiorense – 1997–1999, Santa Clara – 1999–2000

== Iceland ==
- Helgi Daníelsson – Belenenses – 2013–2015
- Eggert Jónsson – Belenenses – 2013–2014

== Indonesia ==
- Greg Nwokolo – Olhanense – 2009–2010
- Calvin Verdonk – Famalicão – 2020–2022

== Republic of Ireland ==
- Pádraig Amond – Paços de Ferreira – 2010–2011
- Phil Babb – Sporting CP – 2000–2002
- Dominic Foley – Braga – 2003–2004
- Joe Hodge – Tondela – 2025–2026
- Mikey Johnston – Vitória de Guimarães – 2022–2023
- Alan Mahon – Sporting CP – (2000)–2001
- Mickey Walsh – Porto – 1980–1986, Salgueiros – 1986–1987, Espinho – 1987–1988

== Iran ==
- Amir Abedzadeh – Marítimo – 2017–2021
- Ali Alipour – Marítimo – 2020–2022, Gil Vicente – 2022–2024
- Alireza Beiranvand – Boavista – 2021–2022
- Alireza Haghighi – Penafiel – 2014–2015, Marítimo – 2015–2016
- Shahriyar Moghanlou – Santa Clara – 2020–2021
- Mehrdad Mohammadi – Aves – 2019–2020
- Mohammad Mohebi – Santa Clara – 2021–2022
- Payam Niazmand – Portimonense – 2021–2022
- Jafar Salmani – Portimonense – 2020–2021
- Mehdi Taremi – Rio Ave – 2019–2020, Porto – 2020–2024

== Iraq ==
- Alaa Abbas – Gil Vicente – 2020–2021
- Mohanad Ali – Portimonense – 2019–2020
- Osama Rashid – Santa Clara – 2018–2021, Vizela – 2022–2024

== Israel ==
- Omri Altman – Arouca – 2021–2022
- Ilan Bakhar – Braga – 2004–2005
- Or Dasa – Arouca – 2021–2022
- Or Israelov – Estoril – 2025–2026
- Dor Jan – Paços de Ferreira – 2020–2021
- Eli Ohana – Braga – 1990–1991
- Miguel Vítor – Benfica – 2008–2010, 2011–2013
- Alex Zahavi – Vitória Setúbal – 2010–2011
- **Karem Zoabi** – **Rio Ave** – 2024–

== Italy ==
- Alberto Aquilani – Sporting CP – 2015–2016
- Mirko Antonucci – Vitória de Setúbal – 2019–2020
- Ibrahima Bamba – Vitória de Guimarães – 2021–2023
- Andrea Belotti – Benfica – 2024–2025
- Stefano Beltrame – Marítimo – 2020–2023
- Tommaso Berni - Braga – 2011–2012
- Mirko Bigazzi – Olhanense – 2013–2014
- Bryan Cristante – Benfica – 2014–2016
- Ivone De Franceschi – Sporting CP – 1999–2000
- Federico Dionisi – Olhanense – 2013–2014
- **Issa Doumbia** – **Sporting CP** – 2026–
- João Pedro – Vitória de Guimarães – 2010–2011, Estoril – 2013–2015
- **Renato Marin** – **Nacional** – 2026–
- Fabrizio Miccoli – Benfica – 2005–07
- Simone Muratore – Tondela – 2021–2022
- Cher Ndour – Benfica – 2022–2023, Braga – 2023–2024
- Dani Osvaldo – Porto – 2015–2016
- Emanuele Pesaresi – Benfica – 2001–2002
- Cristiano Piccini – Sporting CP – 2017–2018
- Riccardo Piscitelli – Nacional – 2020–2021
- Rodrigo Possebon – Braga – 2009–2010
- Francesco Ruberto – Vizela – 2023–2024
- Said Ahmed Said – Rio Ave – 2018–2019
- Mario Sampirisi – Olhanense – 2013–2014
- Ezequiel Schelotto – Sporting CP – 2015–17
- Marcello Trotta – Famalicão – 2020–2021

== Ivory Coast ==
- Mohamed Aidara – Vizela – 2021–2023
- Kódjo Alphonse – Gil Vicente – 2013–2014, Feirense – 2017–2019
- Rodolph Amessan – Académica – 2009–2010, 2012–2013
- **Mohamed Bamba** – **Gil Vicente** – 2024–
- Siaka Bamba – Feirense – 2011–2012, Vitória de Guimarães – 2012–2013
- Willy Boly – Braga – 2015–2017, Porto – 2016–2017
- Ibrahim Cissé – Famalicão – 2019–2020
- Isaac Cissé – Vitória de Guimarães – 2013–2014
- **Stéphane Diarra** – **Alverca** – 2025–
- Evariste Sob Dibo – Rio Ave – 1996–1998, Braga – 1999–2000
- **Ousmane Diomande** – **Sporting CP** – 2022–
- **Eddy Doué** – **Estrela da Amadora** – 2025–
- **Mario Dorgeles** – **Braga** – 2025–
- Idrissa Doumbia – Sporting CP – 2018–2020
- Seydou Doumbia – Sporting CP – 2017–2018
- Gaossou Fofana – Académica – 2007–2008
- **Seko Fofana** – **Porto** – 2025–
- Mory Gbane – Gil Vicente – 2023–2025
- **Lorougnon Gohi** – **Académico Viseu** – 2026–
- **Davy Gui** – **Alverca** – 2025–
- Inters Gui – Vitória de Guimarães – 2014–2015, Académica – 2015–2016
- Idrissa Keita – Santa Clara – 2001–2002
- N'dri Philippe Koffi – Paços de Ferreira – 2021–2023
- **Ghislain Konan** – Vitória de Guimarães – 2016–2018, **Gil Vicente** – 2025–
- Seydou Koné – União de Leiria – 2009–2010
- Koffi Kouao – Moreirense – 2017–2018, Vizela – 2021–2022
- Eboue Kouassi – Arouca – 2021–2022, 2023–2024
- Magique – Académica – 2011–2012, 2013–2015
- Abdul Moustapha – Trofense – 2008–2009
- Ahmed Ouattara – Sporting CP – 1995–1997, Salgueiros – (2000)–2001
- Moudja Sié Ouattara – Tondela – 2025–2026
- Zié Ouattara – Vitória de Guimarães – 2020–2021, Portimonense – 2022–2023
- **Patrick Ouotro** – **Vitória de Guimarães** – 2026–
- Jean Michaël Seri – Paços de Ferreira – 2013–2015
- Ibrahim Sissoko – Académica – 2010–2012
- Ismaila Soro – Arouca – 2022–2023
- Habib Sylla – Chaves – 2022–2024
- Junior Tallo – Vitória de Guimarães – 2017–2019
- Mohamed Touré – Aves – 2019–2020
- Adama Traoré – Vitória de Guimarães – 2014–2015
- Dijilly Vouho – Académica – 2009–2010
- Evrard Zag – Vizela – 2021–2022
- Marco Zoro – Benfica – 2007–2008, Vitória de Setúbal – 2008–2010

== Japan ==
- Koki Anzai – Portimonense – 2019–2021
- Mizuki Arai – Gil Vicente – 2022–2023
- Kanya Fujimoto – Gil Vicente – 2020–2025
- **Taichi Fukui** – Portimonense – 2023–2024, **Arouca** – 2024–
- Shūichi Gonda – Portimonense – 2018–2020
- Nozomi Hiroyama – Braga – 2002–2003
- Takahiro Kunimoto – Casa Pia – 2022–2023
- Daizen Maeda – Marítimo – 2019–2020
- Ryotaro Meshino – Rio Ave – 2020–2021, Estoril – 2021–2022
- Kento Misao – Santa Clara – 2022–2023
- Hidemasa Morita – Santa Clara – 2020–2022, Sporting CP – 2022–2026
- Shoya Nakajima – Portimonense – 2017–2019, 2021–2022, Porto – 2019–2022
- Kosuke Nakamura – Portimonense – 2021–2024
- Takuma Nishimura – Portimonense – 2019–2020
- Ryoya Ogawa – Vitória de Guimarães – 2022–2023
- Theo Ryuki – Portimonense – 2017–2019
- Takahito Soma – Marítimo – 2008–2010
- Yuki Soma – Casa Pia – 2022–2024
- Kyosuke Tagawa – Santa Clara – 2021–2023
- Junya Tanaka – Sporting CP – 2014–2016
- Masaki Watai – Boavista – 2022–2024
- Fuki Yamada – Nacional – 2024–2025

== Kenya ==
- Johnstone Omurwa – Estrela da Amadora – 2023–2024

== Korea Republic ==
- **Hwang In-beom** – **Porto** – 2026–
- Hwang Mun-ki – Académica de Coimbra – 2015–2016
- Jung Jae-kwon – Vitória de Setúbal – 1998
- Kim Byung-suk – Vitória de Setúbal – 2006–2008
- Kim Dong-hyun – Braga – 2005–2007
- **Lee Hyun-ju** – **Arouca** – 2025–
- Lee Seung-woo – Portimonense – 2020–2021
- Park Ji-soo – Portimonense – 2022–2023
- **Song Min-kyu** – **Nacional** – 2026–
- Suk Hyun-jun – Marítimo – 2012–2013, Nacional – 2014–2015, Vitória de Setúbal – 2014–2016, Porto – 2015–2016

== Lebanon ==
- **Samy Merheg** – **Alverca** – 2026–

== Liberia ==
- William Jebor – Rio Ave – 2014–2015
- Musa Shannon – Marítimo – 1999–2001
- Theo Weeks – Marítimo – 2013–2015

== Liechtenstein ==
- Peter Jehle – Boavista – 2006–2008

== Lithuania ==
- Edgaras Jankauskas – Benfica – 2001–(2002), Porto – 2002–2005, Belenenses – 2007–(2008)
- Romualdas Jansonas – Arouca – 2025–2026
- Lukas Spalvis – Sporting – 2016–(2018), Belenenses –2017
- Emilijus Zubas – Arouca – 2021–2023

== Libya ==
- Al-Musrati – Vitória de Guimarães – (2019)–2020, – Rio Ave – 2019–(2020), Braga – 2020–2024
- Hamdou Elhouni – Chaves – 2016–2018, Aves – 2017–2019
- Djamal Mahamat – Beira-Mar – 2010–2011, Braga – 2011–2013

== Luxembourg ==
- **Leandro Barreiro** – **Benfica** – 2024–
- Tim Hall – Gil Vicente – 2020–2021
- Mica Pinto – Belenenses – 2016–2017
- Gerson Rodrigues – AVS – 2024–2025
- Vincent Thill – Nacional – 2020–2021
- Eric Veiga – Aves – 2019–2020, AVS – 2024–2025

== Macedonia ==
- Stefan Ristovski – Sporting CP – 2017–2020
- Wandeir – Naval – (2007)–2008

== Madagascar ==
- Franck Rabarivony – Vitória de Guimarães – 2001–2002

== Malaysia ==
- Guilherme de Paula – Vitória de Setúbal – 2009–2010

== Mali ==
- Zakarias Camara – Marítimo – 1997–1999
- Kalifa Cissé – Estoril, Boavista – 2003–2007
- Amadou Dante – Arouca – 2024–2026
- Abdoulay Diaby – Sporting CP – 2018–2020, Boavista – 2024–2025
- Mourtala Diakité – Beira-Mar – 2005–2007, Boavista – 2007–2008, Belenenses – 2008–2010, 2013–2014, Marítimo – 2009–2010
- Ulysse Diallo – Arouca – 2014–2015, Académica – 2014–2015, Marítimo – 2015–2016
- Mamadou Djikiné – Vitória de Setúbal – 2009–2012
- Issiar Dramé – Estrela da Amadora – 2024–2026
- Habib Sissoko – União de Leiria – 1998–1999
- **Mohamed Kaba** – **Gil Vicente** – 2026–
- Salif Keita - Sporting CP - 1976–1979
- Alphousseyni Keita – União de Leiria – 2011–2012, Académica – 2012–2013, Gil Vicente – 2013–2015
- Moussa Marega – Marítimo – 2014–2016, Porto – 2015–2016, 2017–2021, Vitória de Guimarães – 2016–2017
- Mahamadou N'Diaye – Vitória de Guimarães – 2010–2013
- **Sikou Niakaté** – **Braga** – 2022–
- Falaye Sacko – Vitória de Guimarães – 2016–2022
- Modibo Sagnan – Tondela – 2021–2022
- Mamadou Tounkara – Vitória de Guimarães – 2022–2023
- Adama Traoré – Rio Ave – 2016–2017
- Mamary Traoré – Naval – 2001–2003
- Kévin Zohi – Vizela – 2021–2023

== Malta ==
- Zach Muscat – Farense – 2023–2024
- Udo Nwoko – Leixões – 2007–2009
- André Schembri – Boavista – 2016–2017

== Martinique ==
- **Alexandre Parsemain** – **Moreirense** – 2026–

== Mauritania ==
- Souleymane Anne – Tondela – 2020–2021
- **Dawda Camara** – **Alverca** – 2026–
- Oumar Ngom – Estrela da Amadora – 2025–2026
- Babacar Niasse – Tondela – 2019–2022

== Mauritius ==
- Jonathan Bru – Académica – 2009–2010
- Dylan Collard – Marítimo – 2022–2023

== Mexico ==
- Manuel Negrete Arias – Sporting CP – 1986–1987
- Antonio Briseño – Feirense – 2017–2019
- Jesús Corona – Porto – 2015–2022
- Ulises Dávila – Vitória de Setúbal – 2014–2016
- Francisco Fonseca – Benfica – 2006–2007
- Rogelio Funes Mori – Benfica – 2013–2014
- **Santiago Giménez** – **Porto** – 2026–
- Jesús Gómez – Boavista – 2020–2021
- Raúl Gudiño – União Madeira – 2015–(2016)
- Héctor Herrera – Porto – 2013–2019
- Raúl Jiménez – Benfica – 2015–2018
- Diego Lainez – Braga – 2022–2023
- Miguel Layún – Porto – 2015–2018
- Paolo Medina – Benfica – 2017–2018
- Guillermo Ochoa – AVS – 2024–2025
- Diego Reyes – Porto – 2013–2015, 2017–2018
- Edson Rivera – Braga – 2011–2012
- **Patricio Salas** – **Famalicão** – 2026–
- Jorge Sánchez – Porto – 2023–2024

== Moldova ==
- Oleg Reabciuk – Paços de Ferreira – 2019–2021

== Montenegro ==
- Marko Bakić – Belenenses – 2015–2016, 2017–2018, Braga – 2016–2017
- **Lazar Carević** – **Famalicão** – 2024–
- Andrija Delibašić – Benfica – 2004–(2005), Braga – 2005–2006, Beira-Mar – 2006–(2007)
- Milonja Đukić – Farense – 1991–1998
- Zoran Filipović – Benfica – 1981–1984, Boavista – 1984–1985
- Vladan Giljen – Nacional – 2011–2013
- Ivica Kralj – Porto – (1998)–1999
- Zoran Lemajić – Farense – 1989–1992, Boavista – 1992–1993, Sporting CP – 1993–1995, Marítimo – 1995–1996
- Dejan Ognjanović – Estoril – 2004–2005, 2006–2008
- Sanibal Orahovac – Vitória de Guimarães – 2004–2005, Penafiel – 2005–2006
- Milutin Osmajić – Vizela – 2022–2023
- Dragoslav Poleksić – Chaves – 1996–1998, Campomaiorense – 1998–2001
- Žarko Tomašević – Nacional – 2009–2012
- Budimir Vujačić – Sporting CP – 1993–1997
- Nikola Vukčević – Braga – 2013–2014, 2015–2018
- Simon Vukčević – Sporting CP – 2007–2011, Chaves – 2016–2017
- Ilija Vukotić – Boavista – 2021–2025
- Željko Vuković – Chaves – 1989–1991

== Morocco ==
- Mohamed Abarhoun – Moreirense – 2017–2019
- Faouzi Abdelghani – Vitória de Guimarães – 2010–2012
- Nabil Baha – Naval – 2001–2004, Braga – 2004–2005
- **Yanis Begraoui** – **Estoril** – 2024–
- Zakarya Bergdich – Belenenses SAD – 2018–2019
- Aziz Bouderbala – Estoril – 1992–1993
- **Mohamed Bouldini** – Santa Clara – 2021–2022, **Académico Viseu** – 2026–
- **Simo Bouzaidi** – **Marítimo** – 2026–
- Mehdi Carcela – Benfica – 2015–2016
- Youssef Chippo – Porto – 1996–1999
- Rachid Daoudi – Tirsense – 1995–1996, Belenenses – (1996)–1997
- Aziz Doufikar – Espinho – 1987–1995, Vitória de Setúbal – 1995–1997
- Issam El Adoua – Vitória de Guimarães – 2011–2013, Aves – 2018–2019
- Mustapha El Biyaz – Penafiel – 1987–1988
- Abdessamad El Bouzidi – Académica – (1998)–1999
- Abdelkrim El Hadrioui – Benfica – 1996–1998
- Faysal El Idrissi – Santa Clara – 1999–2000
- **Souffian El Karouani** – **Benfica** – 2026–
- Tahar El Khalej – União de Leiria – 1994–1997, Benfica – 1997–2000
- Ali El-Omari – Gil Vicente – 2001–2003, Boavista – 2003–2004, Estoril – (2004)–2005, Beira-Mar – 2004–(2005), Marítimo – 2005–(2006)
- Amine El Ouazzani – Braga – 2024–2026
- Zouhair Feddal – Sporting CP – 2020–2022
- Youssef Fertout – Belenenses – 1995–1998
- Khalid Fouhami – Académica – (2003)–2004
- Khalid Hachadi – Vitória de Setúbal – 2019–2020
- Mustapha Hadji – Sporting CP – 1996–1997
- Redouane Hajry – Benfica – 1987–1988, União da Madeira – 1989–1990, Farense – 1990–2000
- **Zakaria Kassary** – **Alverca** – 2025–
- Zakaria Labyad – Sporting CP – 2012–2013
- Samir Lagnaoui – Boavista – 1995–1996
- Achraf Lazaar – Portimonense – 2021–2022
- Abdel Bouyboud MlJid – Belenenses – 1994–1998
- Fahd Moufi – Tondela – 2017–2020, Portimonense – 2020–2023
- Rched Larroussi Mounir – Académica – 1996–2001
- Hassan Nader – Farense – 1992–1995, 1997–2004, Benfica – 1995–1997
- Youssef Nader – Farense – 1997–1998
- Noureddine Naybet – Sporting CP – 1994–1996
- Abdkrim Nazir – União de Leiria – 1996–1997
- Yassin Oukili – Casa Pia – 2025–2026
- Hamid Rhanem – Desportivo das Aves – 2002–2003, Naval – 2004–2005
- Abdelilah Saber – Sporting CP – 1996–2000
- Mohammed Sbae – Campomaiorense – 1997–1998
- Tarik Sektioui – Marítimo – 1999, Porto – 2006–2009
- Adel Taarabt – Benfica – 2018–2022
- **Nabil Touaizi** – **Alverca** – 2025–
- Yassir Zabiri – Famalicão – 2024–2026
- Jaouad Zairi – Boavista – (2006)–2007
- **Aymen Zouin** – **Casa Pia** – 2026–

== Mozambique ==
- **Diogo Calila** – Belenenses SAD – 2018–2022, **Santa Clara** – 2022–2023, 2024–
- Ricardo Campos – União Madeira – 2015–2016
- **Geny Catamo** – **Sporting CP** – 2021–2022, 2023–, Vitória de Guimarães – 2021–2022, Marítimo – 2022–2023
- Chiquinho Conde – Belenenses – 1987–1991, 1995–1996, Braga – 1991–1992, Vitória de Setúbal – 1992–1994,(1996)–1997, 1997–2000, Alverca – 2000–2001
- Clésio – Benfica – 2015–2016, Marítimo – 2021–2023
- Dário – Académica – 1996–2004, 2004–2005, Vitória de Guimarães – 2005–2006, Estrela da Amadora – 2006–2007
- Djão – Belenenses – 1979–1987, Penafiel – 1987–1990
- Reginaldo Faife – Nacional – 2013–2015
- Guima – Chaves – 2022–2024
- Ali Hassan – Sporting CP – 1988–1992
- Jojó – União de Leiria – 1992–1993, Penafiel – 1995–1997, Belenenses – 1997–1999
- Eduardo Jumisse – Portimonense – 2010–2011
- Bruno Langa – Chaves – 2022–2024, Estrela da Amadora – 2025–2026
- Reinildo Mandava – Belenenses SAD – 2018–2019
- Mateus – Boavista – 1992–1995
- Geraldo Matsimbe – Nacional – 2016–2017
- Mexer – Sporting CP – 2010–2012, Olhanense – 2010–2012, Nacional – 2012–2014, Estoril – 2022–2023
- Edson Mucuana – AVS – 2025–2026
- Paíto – Sporting CP – 2003–2006, Vitória de Guimarães – 2005–(2006), Braga – 2006–(2007)
- Hélder Pelembe – Portimonense – 2010–2011
- Armando Sá – Belenenses – 1992–1994, Rio Ave – 1988–2001, Braga – 2001, Benfica – 2002–2004
- Tico-Tico – Estrela da Amadora – 1994–1996
- Tininho – Beira-Mar, Belenenses – 2004–05, 2006–07, 2009
- Gildo Vilanculos – Marítimo – 2017–2018
- **Witi** – **Nacional** – 2015–2017, 2018–2019, 2020–2021, 2025–
- Zainadine Júnior – Nacional – 2013–2016, Marítimo – 2016–2023

== Netherlands ==
- Ton Blanker – Vitória de Guimarães – 1980–1981
- Remco Boere – Gil Vicente - 1991–1992
- Khalid Boulahrouz – Sporting CP – 2012–2013
- Luc Castaignos – Sporting CP – 2016–2017, 2018–2019
- Fabian de Freitas – Boavista – 1997–(1998)
- Justin de Haas – Famalicão – 2023–2026
- Luuk de Jong – Porto – 2025–2026
- Bas Dost – Sporting CP – 2016–2020
- Godfried Frimpong – Moreirense – 2021–2022, 2023–2025
- Jimmy Floyd Hasselbaink – Campomaiorense, Boavista – 1995–97
- Glenn Helder – Benfica – 1996–1997
- Danny Henriques – Belenenses SAD – 2019–2022
- Peter Houtman – Sporting CP – 1986–1989
- Ola John – Benfica – 2012–2016, Vitória de Guimarães – 2018–2020
- Ruben Kluivert – Casa Pia – 2024–2025
- Bas Kuipers – Arouca – 2025–2026
- Bruno Martins Indi – Porto – 2014–2016
- Junas Naciri – União da Madeira – 2000–2002, Rio Ave – 2003–2005, Moreirense – 2006–2007
- Ivan Pavlić – Estoril – 2023–2024
- Kaj Ramsteijn – Marítimo – 2014–2015
- Floris Schaap – Portimonense – 1988–1991, Torreense – 1991–1993, Farense – 1993–1995, Braga – 1995–1996
- Stijn Schaars – Sporting CP – 2011–2013
- Romano Sion – Vitória de Guimarães – 2000–2002
- Jorg Smeets – Marítimo – 1999–2000
- Arvid Smit – Marítimo – (2007)–2008, União de Leiria – 2007–(2008)
- Jerry St. Juste – Sporting CP – 2022–2025
- Gaston Taument – Benfica – (1997)–1998
- Stan Valckx – Sporting CP – 1992–1995
- **Finn van Breemen** – **Famalicão** – 2026–
- **Tom van de Looi** – **Famalicão** – 2024–
- Jordan van der Gaag – Belenenses SAD – 2020–2022
- Mitchell van der Gaag – Marítimo – 2001–2006
- **Ennio van der Gouw** – **Rio Ave** – 2025–
- Arjen van der Heide – Tondela – 2025–2026
- Antoine van der Linden – Marítimo – 2007–2009
- **Espen van Ee** – **Arouca** – 2025–
- Ronny van Es – Rio Ave – 2002–2004
- Marco van Ginkel – Boavista – 2024–2025
- Pierre van Hooijdonk – Benfica – 2000–2001
- **Sydney van Hooijdonk** – **Estrela da Amadora** – 2025–
- Ricky van Wolfswinkel – Sporting CP – 2011–2013
- Clyde Wijnhard – Beira-Mar – 2003–2004
- Nordin Wooter – Braga – 2003–2004
- Romeo Wouden – Boavista – (1997)–1998
- Marvin Zeegelaar – Rio Ave – 2014–2016, Sporting CP – 2015–2017

== Niger ==
- Moussa Maâzou – Vitória de Guimarães – 2013–2014, Marítimo – 2014–2015

== Nigeria ==
- Sunday Abalo – Rio Ave – 2014–2015
- Shehu Abdullahi – União Madeira – 2015–2016
- **Umar Abubakar** – **Famalicão** – 2025–
- Jacob Adebanjo – Vitória de Setúbal – (2017)–2018
- Uche Agbo – Benfica – 2019–2020
- Mikel Agu – Porto – 2013–2014, Vitória de Setúbal – 2016–2017, 2018–2019, Vitória de Guimarães – 2019–2021
- Abiodun Agunbiade – Braga – 2000–2003, Naval – 2003–2004
- Chima Akas – Belenenses SAD – 2019–2022
- Tunde Akinsola – AVS – 2024–2026
- Dele Alampasu – Feirense – 2018–2019
- **Ibrahim Alani** – **Marítimo** – 2026–
- Abdullahi Ibrahim Alhassan – Nacional – 2018–2019, 2020–2021
- Amaobi – Rio Ave – 2004–(2005)
- Emmanuel Amuneke – Sporting CP – 1994–1997
- Kevin Amuneke – Vitória de Setúbal – 2006–2007, Nacional – 2009–2010
- Chidozie Awaziem – Porto – 2015–2016, Boavista – 2020–2022, 2023–2024
- Stanley Awurum – Portimonense – 2017–2018
- **Israel Isaac Ayuma** – **Marítimo** – 2026–
- Azeez Balogun – Belenenses – 2009–2012
- Femi Balogun – Olhanense – 2013–2014, Belenenses – 2017–2018
- Chidi Onyemah – Rio Ave – 2005–2010
- Haruna Doda – Belenenses – 1999–2000
- Elderson Echiéjilé – Braga – 2010–2014
- Joseph Enakarhire – Sporting CP – 2004–2005
- Anderson Esiti – Estoril – 2014–2017
- Peter Etebo – Feirense – 2016–2018
- Friday Etim – Vizela – 2021–2023
- Chidera Ezeh – Portimonense – 2017–2019
- Kuku Fidelis – Boavista – 2020–2021
- Reuben Gabriel – Boavista – 2014–2016
- Saviour Godwin – Casa Pia – 2022–2024
- Taiwo Hassan – Marítimo – 2011–2012
- Abbas Ibrahim – Paços de Ferreira – 2020–2023
- Christian Irobiso – Paços de Ferreira – 2011–2014
- Ahmed Isaiah – Gil Vicente – 2019–2021
- **Isaac James** – **Alverca** – 2025–
- Ani Jeremiah – Estrela da Amadora – (2007)–2008
- Taofiq Jibril – Portimonense – 2018–2019
- Stanley Kanu – Marítimo – 2022–2023
- Sunny Ekeh Kingsley – Beira-Mar – 2003–2005
- Yusuf Lawal – Arouca – 2023–2024
- Henry Makinwa – Penafiel – 1997–1998, Vitória de Setúbal – 1998–2001, Gil Vicente – 2001–2002
- **Abraham Marcus** – Portimonense – 2021–2022, Porto – 2022–2023, **Estrela da Amadora** – 2025–
- Emmanuel Maviram – Vizela – 2021–2022, Tondela – 2025–2026
- Terem Moffi – Porto – 2025–2026
- Kelechi Nwakali – Chaves – 2023–2024
- Uche Nwofor – Boavista – 2015–2016
- Charles Obi – Boavista – 2007–(2008)
- Nwankwo Obiora – Académica – 2014–2016, Boavista – 2018–2020, Chaves – 2022–2023
- Christian Obodo – Olhanense – 2013–2014
- John Ogu – União de Leiria – 2011–2012, Académica – 2012–2014
- Uche Okafor – União de Leiria – (1994)–1995, Farense – 1995–1996
- Samuel Okunowo – Benfica – 1999–2000
- Ibrahim Olanrewaju – Marítimo – 2011–2013
- Oladapo Olufemi – Boavista – 2007–2008
- Bruno Onyemaechi – Boavista – 2022–2025
- **Ejike Opara** – **Vitória de Guimarães** – 2025–
- Monsuru Opeyemi – Vizela – 2022–2023
- Chidi Osuchukwu – Braga – 2013–2014
- Richard Daddy Owubokiri ("Ricky") – Benfica – 1988–(1989), Estrela da Amadora – 1989–1991, Boavista – 1991–1994, Belenenses – 1994–1995
- Pascal – Nacional – 2001–2002, Vitória de Setúbal – 2002–2004,(2005)–2006, Penafiel – 2004–2005
- Junior Pius – Tondela – 2017–2018, Chaves – 2023–2024
- Peter Rufai – Farense – 1994–1997, Gil Vicente – 1999–2000
- Samson – Braga – 2000–2003
- **Zaidu Sanusi** – Santa Clara – 2019–2020, **Porto** – 2020–
- Adewale Sapara – Portimonense – 2021–2023
- Naziru Shuabiu – Rio Ave – 2024–2025
- Samson Siasia – Tirsense – 1995–1996
- Simy – Gil Vicente – 2013–2015
- Peter Suswam – Vitória de Setúbal – 2011–2013
- Michael Uchebo – Boavista – 2014–2016
- Rashidi Yekini – Vitória de Setúbal – 1990–1994, 1996–(1997)
- Bamidele Yusuf – Estoril – 2022–2023

== Northern Ireland ==
- Colin Hill – Marítimo – 1986–1987

== Norway ==
- **Fredrik Aursnes** – **Benfica** – 2022–
- Noah Holm – Vitória de Guimarães – 2020–2021
- Azar Karadas – Benfica – 2004–2005
- Kevin Krygård – Casa Pia – 2023–2024
- Stian Ringstad – Braga – 2015–2016
- **Andreas Schjelderup** – **Benfica** – 2022–2023, 2024–

== Pakistan ==
- Easah Suliman – Vitória de Guimarães – 2019–2021

== Palestine ==
- Javier Cohene – Paços de Ferreira – 2010–2013, Vitória de Setúbal – 2013–2014
- Oday Dabbagh – Arouca – 2021–2023
- Daniel Mustafá – Estrela da Amadora – 2008–2009, Belenenses – 2009–2010

== Panama ==
- Jorman Aguilar – Estoril – 2017–2018
- Abdiel Arroyo – Santa Clara – 2018–2019
- Ricardo Clarke – Boavista – 2017–2018
- José Luis Garcés – Belenenses – 2006–2007, Académica – 2008–2009
- Gabriel Gómez – Belenenses – 2007–2008, 2008–2010
- Roderick Miller – Feirense – 2018–2019
- José Luis Rodríguez – Famalicão – 2022–2024
- Alfredo Stephens – Santa Clara – 2018–2019
- Tony Taylor – Estoril – 2012–2013, Paços de Ferreira – 2016–2017

== Paraguay ==
- Melanio Olmedo – Lusit. Évora – 1958–1959
- Marcos Acosta – Vitória de Setúbal – 2013–2014
- Diego Aguilera – Farense – (1999)–2000
- Antolín Alcaraz – Beira-Mar – 2002–2007
- Victor Aquino – Marítimo – 2008–(2009)
- Jorge Brítez – Braga – 1999–2001, Moreirense – 2003–2004
- Mauro Caballero – Arouca – 2021–2022
- Fernando Cardozo – Boavista – 2019–2020
- Óscar Cardozo – Benfica – 2007–2014
- Ramón Cardozo – Vitória de Setúbal – 2013–2014, Moreirense – 2014–2016
- Diego Duarte – AVS – 2025–2026
- Diego Figueredo – Boavista – 2005–2006
- Carlos Gamarra – Benfica – 1997–1998
- Walter González – Arouca – 2015–2017, Santa Clara – 2022–2023
- Juan Iturbe – Porto – 2011–2013
- Lorenzo Melgarejo – Paços de Ferreira – 2011–2012, Benfica – 2012–2013
- **Alan Núñez** – **Nacional** – 2025–
- Luis Páez – Sporting CP – (2008)–2009
- Carlos Paredes – Porto – 2000–2002, Sporting CP – 2006–2008
- Iván Piris – Sporting CP – 2013–2014
- Victor Quintana – Porto – 2001–2002, Moreirense – 2003–2004
- César Ramírez – Sporting CP – 1996–1999
- Fabio Ramos – Rio Ave – 1998–2001, Marítimo – 2001–2004
- Daniel Rivas – AVS – 2025–2026
- Jorge Rojas – Belenenses – 2013–2014
- Ricardo Ismael Rojas – Benfica – 1999–2001
- Carlos Servin – Vitória de Setúbal – 2013–2014
- Miguel Velasquez Villalba – Fafe – 1987–1989

== Peru ==
- Luis Advíncula – Vitória de Setúbal – 2014–2015
- Ronald Baroni – Porto – 1994–1995, Felgueiras – 1995–1996
- Iván Bulos – Boavista – 2016–2018
- André Carrillo – Sporting CP – 2011–2016, Benfica – 2016–2017
- Jesús Castillo – Gil Vicente – 2023–2025
- Teófilo Cubillas – Porto – 1974–1976
- Gustavo Dulanto – Boavista – 2019–2020
- Paolo Hurtado – Paços de Ferreira – 2012–2015, Vitória de Guimarães – 2015–2018
- Germán Leguía – Farense – 1987–(1988)
- Percy Liza – Marítimo – 2022–2023
- Abel Augusto Lobatón – Marítimo – 2004–(2005)
- Carlos Olascuaga – Académica – 2014–2015
- Sergio Peña – Tondela – 2018–2019
- Junior Ponce – Vitória de Setúbal – 2014–2015
- Alberto Rodríguez – Braga – 2007–2011, Sporting CP – 2011–2012, Rio Ave – 2012–2014
- Juan Seminario – Sporting CP – 1959–1961
- Jhonny Vidales – Marítimo – 2014–2015
- Pablo Zegarra – Farense - 2000–2001

== Poland ==
- Dariusz Adamczuk – Belenenses – 1994–1995
- **Jan Bednarek** – **Porto** – 2025–
- Marcin Chmiest – Braga – 2006–2007
- Adam Dźwigała – Aves – 2019–2020
- Rafał Grzelak – Boavista – 2006–2008
- Andrzej Juskowiak – Sporting CP – 1992–1995
- **Jakub Kamiński** – **Benfica** – 2026–
- Krzysztof Kazimierczak – Boavista – 2006–(2007)
- Przemysław Kaźmierczak – Boavista – 2006–2007, Porto – 2007–2010, Vitória de Setúbal – 2009–2010
- Paweł Kieszek – Braga – 2007–2008, Vitória de Setúbal – 2008–2009, 2012–2014, Porto – 2010–2011, Estoril – 2014–2016, Rio Ave – 2019–2021
- **Jakub Kiwior** – **Porto** – 2025–
- Antoni Łukasiewicz – União de Leiria – 2007–2008
- Łukasz Madej – Académica – 2008–2009
- Maciej Makuszewski – Vitória de Setúbal – 2015–2016
- Grzegorz Mielcarski – Porto – 1995–1999
- Michał Miśkiewicz – Feirense – 2017–2018
- **Cezary Miszta** – **Rio Ave** – 2023–
- Józef Młynarczyk – Porto – 1985–1989
- **Oskar Pietuszewski** – **Porto** – 2025–
- Marek Saganowski – Vitória de Guimarães – 2005–2006
- Bartosz Ślusarski – União de Leiria – 2006–2007
- Dominik Steczyk – Académico Viseu – 2026–2027
- Andrzej Woźniak – Porto – 1996–1997, Braga – 1997–1998
- Mateusz Zachara – Tondela – 2017–2018
- **Oliwier Zych** – **Vitória de Guimarães** – 2026–

== Qatar ==
- Hussein Yasser – Braga – (2007)–2008, Boavista – 2007–(2008)

== Romania ==
- Camora – Beira-Mar – 2006–2007, Naval – 2008–2011
- Ovidiu Cuc – Chaves – 1996–1999, Gil Vicente – 1999–2000
- Alex Dobre – Famalicão – 2022–2024
- Iosif Fabian – Sporting CP – 1953–1955, Barreirense – 1955–1957, Caldas – (1958)–1959
- Lucian Marinescu – Farense – 1999–2000, Académica – 2002–2004
- Sebastian Mladen – Olhanense – 2013–2014
- Marius Niculae – Sporting CP – 2001–2005
- Basarab Panduru – Benfica – (1995)–1996, 1996–1998, Porto – (1998)–1999, Salgueiros – (1999)–2000
- Wilhelm Possak – Sporting CP – 1935–36
- Raul Rusescu – Braga – 2013–2014
- Marcel Sabou – Chaves – 1996–1998
- Cristian Săpunaru – Porto – 2008–2012
- Ion Sburlea – Marítimo – 1999–(2000)
- László Sepsi – Benfica 2007–(2008)
- **Ianis Stoica** – **Estrela da Amadora** – 2025–
- **Tony Strata** – **Vitória de Guimarães** – 2025–
- Marius Șumudică – Marítimo – 1999–2001
- Ion Timofte – Porto – 1991–1994, Boavista – 1994–2000

== Russia ==
- Dmitri Alenichev – Porto – 2000–2004
- Konstantin Bazelyuk – Estoril – 2016–2017
- Ilshat Faizulin – Alverca – 1998–1999, Farense – (1999)–2000
- Andrei Ivanov – Alverca – 1998–1999
- Marat Izmailov – Sporting CP – 2007–2013, Porto – 2012–2013
- Andrei Karyaka – Benfica – 2005–2007
- Vasili Kulkov – Benfica – 1991–1994, Porto – 1994–1995, Alverca – 1999–2000
- Aleksandr Kuzmichyov – Feirense – 1992–1993
- Stanislav Kritsyuk – Braga 2013–2016, Rio Ave 2013–(2014), Belenenses SAD 2020–2021, Gil Vicente – 2021–2023
- Vitali Lystsov – Tondela – 2016–2017, Boavista – 2024–2025
- Alexander Mostovoi – Benfica – 1992–1993
- Sergei Ovchinnikov – Benfica – 1998–1999, Alverca – 1999–2000, Porto – 2000–2002
- Dmitri Prokopenko – Braga – 1997–1999, Santa Clara – 1999–2000, Varzim – 2000–2002
- Aleksandr Yeshchenko – Belenenses – 1993–1994
- Sergei Yuran – Benfica – 1991–1994, Porto – 1994–1995
- Ivan Zlobin – Famalicão – 2020–2025

== Saint Lucia ==
- Earl Jean – Felgueiras – 1995–1996

== São Tomé and Príncipe ==
- Marcos Barbeiro – Marítimo – 2015–2016
- Harramiz – Tondela – 2017–2018
- Jairson – Vitória de Guimarães – 1999–2000
- Luís Leal – União de Leiria – 2011–2012, Estoril – 2012–2014, Belenenses – 2015–2016
- Orlando – Estrela da Amadora – 1995–1997

== Saudi Arabia ==
- Abdullah Al-Hafith – União de Leiria – 2011–2012
- Saleh Al-Shehri – Beira-Mar – 2012–2013
- Shaher Mansour – Vitória de Setúbal – 2015–2016

== Scotland ==
- Ryan Gauld – Sporting CP – 2014–2015, Vitória de Setúbal – 2016–2017, Aves – 2017–2018, Farense – 2020–2021
- **Jordan Holsgrove** – Paços de Ferreira – 2022–2023, **Estoril** – 2023–
- Steve Kean – Académica – 1988–1991
- Stephen McPhee – Beira-Mar – 2004–2005
- Billy Rafferty – Farense – 1985–1988
- Ian Wallace – Marítimo – 1986–1987

== Senegal ==
- Abdoulaye Ba – Académica – 2011–2012, Porto – 2012–2013, 2013–2014, Vitória de Guimarães – 2013–2014, Moreirense – 2020–2022, Arouca – 2021–2022
- **Ibrahima Ba** – Famalicão – 2024–2026, **Sporting CP** – 2026–
- Mamadou Ba – Boavista – 2014–2015, 2016–2017
- Sidi Bane – AVS – 2025–2026
- Yves Baraye – Gil Vicente – 2019–2021, Belenenses SAD – 2021–2022
- Mame Birame – Estrela da Amadora – 1993–1996
- Racine Coly – Famalicão – 2019–2020, Estoril – 2021–2022
- Oumar Diakhité – Olhanense – 2013–2014, Estoril – 2015–2018, Aves – 2019–2020
- Abdoulaye Diallo – Aves – 2018–2020
- Mallo Diallo – Penafiel – 2005–2007
- Lamine Diarra – Beira-Mar – 2006–(2007)
- Baba Diawara – Marítimo – 2008–2012, 2015–2017
- El Hadji Diouf II – Vitória de Setúbal – (2009)–2010
- Alioune Fall – Chaves – 2016–2017
- Ablaye Faye – Aves – 2018–2019
- Fary Faye – Beira-Mar – 1998–2003, Boavista – 2003–2008, 2014–2015
- **Souleymane Faye** – **Sporting CP** – 2025–
- Marcel Gomis – Olhanense – 2007–2008, 2009–2011
- Moussa Gueye – Académica – 2013–2014
- Abdou Guirassy – Nacional – 2009–2010
- Ladji Keita – Rio Ave – 2005–2008, Vitória de Setúbal – 2009–2010, Braga – 2010–2011, Nacional – 2011–2013
- Khadim – Boavista – 2000–2007
- Moussa Koné – Boavista – 2024–2025
- Lama – Vitória de Guimarães – 1997–1998
- Mamadou Loum – Moreirense – 2018–2019, Porto – 2018–2021, Arouca – 2024–2025
- Yoro Ly – Boavista – 2014–2015
- Idrissa Mandiang – Boavista – 2014–2020
- Mouhamed Mbaye – Porto – 2019–2020
- Maurice Mendy – Moreirense – 2004–2007
- Deme N'Diaye – Estrela da Amadora – 2005–2009
- Madior N'Diaye – Vitória de Setúbal – 2005–2007
- Mamadou N'Diaye – Vitória de Setúbal – 2006–2007
- Mor Ndiaye – Estoril – 2022–2024
- Ousmane N'Diaye – Beira-Mar – 1994–(1995)
- Alioune Ndour – Belenenses SAD – 2021–2022, Estrela da Amadora – 2023–2024
- **Alioune Ndoye** – **Vitória de Guimarães** – 2025–
- Dame N'Doye – Académica – 2006–2007
- Ousmane N'Doye – Estoril – (2004)–2005, Penafiel – 2004–2006, Académica Coimbra – 2005–2008
- Pierre Sagna – Moreirense – 2015–2018, Belenenses SAD – 2018–2019, Santa Clara – 2019–2023
- Oumar Sané – Belenenses – 2003–2004
- Sidy Sarr – Chaves – 2022–2023
- Moustapha Seck – Portimonense – 2022–2024
- Adama François Sene – Vitória de Setúbal – 2009–2011, 2013–2016
- Modou Sougou – União de Leiria – 2004–2005, 2006–2008, Vitória de Guimarães – 2005–2006, Académica – 2008–2011, Moreirense – 2016–2017
- Djibril Soumaré – Nacional – 2024–2025
- Pape Sow – Académica – 2010–2012, Rio Ave – 2014–2015
- Mickaël Tavares – Alverca – 2000–2002
- **Antoine Wenck** – **Rio Ave** – 2026–
- Kalidou Yero – Gil Vicente – 2011–2013

== Serbia ==
- Komnen Andrić – Belenenses – 2016–2017
- Darko Anić – Nacional – (2005)–2006, Rio Ave – 2005–(2006)
- Srđan Babić – Famalicão – 2020–2021
- Srđan Bajčetić – Braga – 1997–1998
- Jovo Bosančić – União da Madeira – 1992–1996, 1999–2000, Campomaiorense – 1995–(1996), Nacional – 2000–2003
- Miloš Bosančić – Boavista – (2007)–2008
- Aleksandar Busnić – Vizela – 2023–2024
- Nemanja Ćalasan – Chaves – 2018–2019
- Miroslav Ćurčić – Farense – 1990–1991, Belenenses – 1991–1993, Estoril – 1993–1996
- Vukašin Dević – Beira-Mar – 2006–2007, Belenenses – 2007–2008, 2009–2010
- Nenad Divac – Rio Ave – 1996–1999
- Ljubinko Drulović – Gil Vicente – 1992–1993, Porto – 1994–2001, Benfica – 2001–2003, Penafiel – 2004–2005
- Ivan Dudić – Benfica – 2000–2002
- Ivan Đurđević – Farense – 2000–2002, Vitória de Guimarães – 2002–2005, Belenenses – 2005–2007
- Milan Đurđević – Leça – (1995)–1996
- Anđelko Đuričić – União de Leiria – 2009–2011
- Filip Đuričić – Benfica – 2013–2014, 2015–2016
- Božidar Đurković – Vitória de Guimarães – 1998–1999
- Ljubomir Fejsa – Benfica – 2013–2020
- Milan Gajić – Boavista – (2007)–2008
- Dragan Groćeša – União da Madeira – 1990–1998
- Marko Grujić – Porto – 2020–2025
- Nemanja Gudelj – Sporting CP – 2018–2019
- Marko Gudžulić – Estrela da Amadora – 2024–2025
- Zoran Hajdić – Salgueiros – 1994–1998
- Željko Janović – Gil Vicente – 1995–1996
- Predrag Jokanović – União da Madeira – 1993–1995, Marítimo – 1995–2001, Nacional – 2001–2003
- Milić Jovanović – Nacional – 1994–1996, Leça – 1996–2000
- Luka Jović – Benfica – 2015–2017
- Nemanja Jović – Estoril – 2023–2024
- Dejan Kerkez – Marítimo – 2019–2021
- Stevan Kovačević – Naval – 2008–2010
- Aleksandar Krstić – Beira-Mar – 1992–1994, Felgueiras – 1994–1996
- **Stefan Leković** – **Estrela da Amadora** – 2025–
- Dragoslav Lepinjica – União da Madeira – 1990–1996
- Ivan Litera – Salgueiros – 2000–2002, Estrela da Amadora – 2003–2004
- Matija Ljujić – Belenenses SAD – 2018–2020
- Andrija Luković – Famalicão – 2020–2021, Belenenses SAD – 2021–2022
- Nikola Maraš – Chaves – 2017–2019
- Nenad Markičević – União da Madeira – 1994–1998
- Lazar Marković – Benfica – 2013–2014, Sporting CP – 2016–2017
- Nemanja Matić – Benfica – 2011–2014
- Zoran Mijanović – Farense – 1998–2002
- Aleksandar Miljković – Braga – 2013–2014
- Nikola Milojević – Vitória de Setúbal – 2006–2009
- **Jovan Milošević** – **Braga** – 2026–
- Stevan Milovac – Salgueiros – 1989–1997
- Branko Milovanović – Vitória de Guimarães – 1997–1999
- Marko Milovanović – Alverca – 2025–2026
- **Matija Mitrović** – **Vitória de Guimarães** – 2025–
- Miljan Mrdaković – Vitória de Guimarães – 2007–2008
- Jovica Nikolić – Salgueiros – 1989–1993
- Miloš Obradović – União de Leiria – 2011–2012
- Srđan Obradović – Braga – 1995–1996
- Aleksandar Paločević – Nacional – 2018–2019
- Miloš Pavlović – Académica – 2006–2009
- Marko Petković – Tondela – 2019–2020
- Sava Petrov – Vizela – 2023–2024
- Nemanja Petrović – Chaves – 2016–2017
- Radosav Petrović – Rio Ave – 2016–2017, Sporting CP – 2017–2019
- **Boris Popović** – **Arouca** – 2024–
- Dragan Punišić – Beira-Mar – 1993–1995, Farense – 1995–1998
- Uroš Račić – Famalicão – 2019–2020, Braga – 2022–2023, 2024–2025
- Siniša Radanović – Vitória de Guimarães – 2007–2008
- Nemanja Radonjić – Benfica – 2021–2022
- Mihailo Ristić – Benfica – 2022–2024
- Sreto Ristić – Campomaiorense – 1999–(2000)
- Lazar Rosić – Braga – 2016–2018, Nacional – 2018–2019, Moreirense – 2019–2022
- Jovo Simanić – Boavista – 1994–1995
- Saša Šimić – União da Madeira – 1994–1996, 1999–2002, Boavista – 1996–1998, Beira-Mar – 1998–1999
- Igor Stefanović – Arouca – 2013–2014, Moreirense – 2015–2016
- Milan Stepanov – Porto – 2007–2009
- Filip Stevanović – Santa Clara – 2022–2023
- Goran Stevanović – Farense – 1993–1994, Vitória de Setúbal – 1994–1995, Campomaiorense – 1995–1996
- **Mateja Stjepanović** – **Moreirense** – 2025–
- Nikola Stojiljković – Braga – 2015–2018, Boavista – 2019–2020, Farense – 2020–2021
- Vladimir Stojković – Sporting CP – 2007–2011
- Vladan Stojković – Leça – 1994–2000
- Vlada Stošić – Vitória de Setúbal – 1997–1999
- Miralem Sulejmani – Benfica – 2013–2015
- Mile Svilar – Benfica – 2017–2021
- Ivan Todorović – Nacional – 2010–2012
- Mirko Topić – Famalicão – 2023–2025
- Borko Veselinović – Beira-Mar – 2006–(2007)
- Zoran Vukčević – Chaves – (1994)–1995, 1996–1997
- Goran Živanović – União da Madeira – 1991–1996
- Andrija Živković – Benfica – 2016–2020

== Sierra Leone ==
- Lamin Conteh – Boavista – (1997)–1998, Varzim – 1997–(1998)
- Osman Kakay – Boavista – 2024–2025
- Gbassay Sessay – Estrela da Amadora – 1987–1989, Vitória de Setúbal – 1992–1994, 1995–1996

== Slovakia ==
- Vojtech Andrášik – Porto – 1940–1943
- Róbert Boženík – Boavista – 2022–2025
- Marek Čech – Porto – 2005–2008, Boavista – 2014–2015
- Martin Chrien – Benfica – 2017–2018, Santa Clara – 2018–2019
- **Roland Galčík** – **Rio Ave** – 2026–
- Marián Had – Sporting CP – 2007–2008
- Milan Lalkovič – Vitória de Guimarães – 2012–2013
- Tomáš Oravec – Boavista – 2005–(2006)
- Boris Peškovič – Académica – 2008–2009
- **Jakub Vinarčík** – **Arouca** – 2025–
- Jakub Vojtuš – Olhanense – 2013–2014
- Marián Zeman – Beira-Mar – 2003–2005

== Slovenia ==
- Vid Belec – Olhanense – 2013–2014
- Žiga Frelih – Gil Vicente – 2021–2022
- Andrej Komac – Marítimo – (2005)–2006
- Rene Mihelič – Nacional – 2010–2013
- Jan Oblak – União de Leiria – 2011–2012, Rio Ave – 2012–2013, Benfica – 2013–2014
- Miran Pavlin – Porto – 2000–2002
- Nejc Pečnik – Nacional – 2009–2012
- Damir Pekič – Marítimo – 2005–2006
- Ermin Rakovič – Nacional – 1997–1998, Beira-Mar – 1998–1999
- Andraž Šporar – Sporting CP – 2019–2021, Braga – 2020–2021
- **Martin Turk** – **Estoril** – 2025–
- Igor Vekić – Paços de Ferreira – 2021–2023
- Etien Velikonja – Rio Ave – 2013–2014
- Zlatko Zahovič – Vitória de Guimarães – 1993–1996, Porto – 1996–1999, Benfica – 2001–2005

== Somalia ==
- Liban Abdi – Olhanense – 2012–2013, Académica – 2013–2014

== South Africa ==
- David Byrne – Estoril – 1983–1984, Belenenses – 1984–1985
- Lyle Foster – Vitória de Guimarães – 2020–2021
- Calvin Kadi – Portimonense – 2010–2011
- Kobamelo Kodisang – Braga – 2021–2022, Moreirense – 2023–2024, AVS – 2025–2026
- Jan Lechaba – Beira-Mar – 1979–1980
- Benni McCarthy – Porto – 2003–2006
- Thibang Phete – Vitória de Guimarães – 2015–2016, Famalicão – 2019–2020, Belenenses SAD – 2019–2022, Chaves – 2023–2024
- Kgaogelo Sekgota – Vitória de Setúbal – 2018–2020
- Kwenzokuhle Shinga – Estrela da Amadora – 2023–2024
- Luther Singh – Chaves – 2018–2019, 2022–2023, Moreirense – 2019–2020, Paços de Ferreira – 2020–2021
- **Sphephelo Sithole** – Belenenses SAD – 2019–2022, Gil Vicente – 2024–2025, **Tondela** – 2025–
- Eric Tinkler – Vitória de Setúbal – 1992–1996
- Bongani Zungu – Vitória de Guimarães – 2016–2018
- Mandla Zwane – Penafiel – 1994–1995, Gil Vicente – 1995–1996

== Spain ==
- Dani Abalo – Beira-Mar – 2012–2013
- Antonio Adán – Sporting CP – 2020–2024
- **Samu Aghehowa** – **Porto** – 2024–
- Martín Aguirregabiria – Famalicão – 2022–2024
- Ángel Alarcón – Porto – 2025–2026
- Ustaritz Aldekoaotalora – Arouca – 2013–2015, Penafiel – 2014–2015
- Ángel Algobia – AVS – 2025–2026
- **Sergi Altimira** – **Sporting CP** – 2026–
- Carlos Pérez Álvarez – Chaves – 1998–1999, Vitória de Guimarães – 1999–2001, Nacional – 2001–2004
- Miguel Ángel Angulo – Sporting CP – (2009)–2010
- Mikel Antía – Braga – 2002–2003
- Antoñín – Vitória de Guimarães – 2022–2023
- **Óscar Aranda** – **Famalicão** – 2023–
- Jonny Arriba – Chaves – 2022–2023
- Ibón Pérez Arrieta – Braga – 2002–2003, Estoril – 2004–2005
- Iñigo Arteaga – Chaves – 1998–2000
- César de Loma Atienza – Boavista – (1999)–2000
- Javier Avilés – Tondela – 2021–2022
- **Miguel Baeza** – Rio Ave – 2022–2023, **Nacional** – 2024–
- **Iván Barbero** – **Arouca** – 2025–
- **Sergio Barcia** – **Braga** – 2026–
- Héctor Bellerín – Sporting CP – 2022–2023
- José Belman – Nacional – 2001–2008
- Álex Bermejo – Farense – 2024–2025
- **Sergio Bermejo** – **Gil Vicente** – 2024–
- Juan Bernat – Benfica – 2023–2024
- **Fabio Blanco** – **Vitória de Guimarães** – 2025–
- Raúl Blanco – Casa Pia – 2024–2025
- **Jalen Blesa** – **Rio Ave** – 2025–
- Alberto Bodelón – Estrela da Amadora – 1996–1998
- **Miguel Ángel Brau** – **Académico Viseu** – 2026–
- Bráulio – Farense – 1996–1998
- Alberto Bueno – Porto – 2015–2016, Boavista – 2018–2020
- Oriol Busquets – Arouca – 2022–2024
- **Adrián Butzke** – Paços de Ferreira – 2021–2023, Vitória de Guimarães – 2023–2024, Nacional – 2024–2025, **Marítimo** – 2026–
- Gonzalo Calçada – Estrela da Amadora – 2025–2026
- Martín Calderón – Paços de Ferreira – 2020–2021
- Ezequiel Calvente – Penafiel – 2014–2015
- José Campaña – Porto – 2014–2015
- Joan Capdevila – Benfica – 2011–2012
- Diego Capel – Sporting CP – 2011–2015
- Carlos Isaac – Vizela – 2022–2023
- Enrique Carreño – Académica – 2010–2011
- Álvaro Carreras – Benfica – 2023–2025
- Iker Casillas – Porto – 2015–2019
- Catanha – Belenenses – 1995–1996, 2004–2005
- Cristian Ceballos – Arouca – 2013–2014
- Álex Centelles – Famalicão – 2019–2020
- Salva Chamorro – Tondela – 2015–2016
- Chano – Benfica – 1999–2001
- **Mario Climent** – **Arouca** – 2026–
- **Selvi Clua** – **Casa Pia** – 2026–
- Diego Collado – Gil Vicente – 2024–2025
- **Michael Dacosta** – **Moreirense** – 2026–
- Dani – Naval – 2002–2004, 2007–2008, Académica – 2004–2006
- Fran Delgado – Farense – 2023–2024
- Raúl de Tomás – Benfica – 2019–2020
- José Luis Deus – Braga – 2000–2001
- Dani Díaz – Chaves – 1995–1998, Marítimo – 1998–2001
- Álvaro Djaló – Braga – 2022–2024
- Jordi Escobar – AVS – 2025–2026
- **Antonio Espigares** – **Gil Vicente** – 2025–
- Andrés Fernández – Porto – 2014–2015
- Roberto Fernández – Braga – 2024–2025
- **Valery Fernández** – **Académico Viseu** – 2026–
- **Mateo Flores** – **Arouca** – 2025–
- **José Fontán** – **Arouca** – 2024–
- Paco Fortes – Farense – 1984–1991
- Fran – Leça – 1996–2000
- **Iván Fresneda** – **Sporting CP** – 2023–
- Francisco Gallardo – Vitória de Guimarães – 2005–(2006)
- José Luís Gallardo – Campomaiorense – 1997–1998
- Javi García – Benfica – 2009–2012, Boavista – 2020–2022
- **Santi García** – **Gil Vicente** – 2024–
- Ismaël Gharbi – Braga – 2024–2026
- Alan Godoy – Estrela da Amadora – 2025–2026
- **Sergi Gómez** – **Alverca** – 2025–
- **Víctor Gómez** – **Braga** – 2022–
- Cristo González – Arouca – 2023–2025
- Mario González – Tondela – 2020–2021, Braga – 2021–2022, Famalicão – 2024–2025
- Nico González – Porto – 2023–2025
- **Pablo Gozálbez** – **Arouca** – 2024–
- Jaume Grau – Tondela – 2020–2021, AVS – 2024–2026
- Álex Grimaldo – Benfica – 2015–2023
- Marc Gual – Rio Ave – 2025–2026
- **Héctor Hernández** – Chaves – 2022–2024, **Gil Vicente** – 2025–
- Manu Hernando – Tondela – 2021–2022
- Xabi Huarte – Tondela – 2025–2026
- Raúl Iglesias – Farense – 1998–2001
- Iván Jaime – Famalicão – 2020–2023, Porto – 2023–2025
- Jason – Arouca – 2023–2025
- Jesé – Sporting CP – 2019–2020
- Jony – Rio Ave – 2014–2015
- **Joan Jordán** – **Estrela da Amadora** – 2026–
- Joel Jorquera – Moreirense – 2024–2026
- José Ángel – Porto – 2014–2016
- Koke – Sporting CP – 2005–(2006)
- Gaizka Larrazabal – Casa Pia – 2023–2026
- Rufino Lekue – Moreirense – 2002–2003
- Loinaz – Leça – 1997–1999
- Adrián López – Porto – 2014–2015, 2016–2017, 2018–2019
- Iván Marcano – Porto – 2014–2025
- Carlos Marchena – Benfica – 2000–2001
- Marcelino – União de Leiria – 1999–2000
- Adrián Marín – Famalicão – 2021–2022, Gil Vicente – 2022–2023, Braga – 2023–2025
- **Tommy Marqués** – **Braga** – 2026–
- José Marsà – Sporting CP – 2021–2023
- **Álvaro Martínez** – **Moreirense** – 2025–
- **Gabri Martínez** – **Braga** – 2024–
- Mario Martínez – Boavista – 2015–2016
- Toni Martínez – Famalicão – 2019–2021, Porto – 2020–2025
- Matute – Chaves – 1996–1998
- Jordi Mboula – Estoril – 2021–2022, Gil Vicente – 2024–2025
- **Fernando Medrano** – **Estoril** – 2026–
- Tomás Mendes – Alverca – 2025–2026
- Fran Mérida – Braga – 2011–2012
- **Alejandro Mestanza** – **Académico Viseu** – 2026–
- Álex Millán – Famalicão – 2022–2023, Farense – 2024–2025
- Míner – Chaves – 1995–1998, Alverca – 1999–2000, Santa Clara – 2000–2004
- Moisés – Santa Clara – 2002–2003
- Guillem Molina – AVS – 2025–2026
- Javi Montero – Arouca – 2023–2024
- Tòfol Montiel – Vitória de Setúbal – 2019–2020
- Mora – Belenenses – 2001–2002
- Miguel Mora – União da Madeira – 2001–2003, Rio Ave – 2003–2010
- José Luis Morales – Santa Clara – 2001–2002
- Marco Moreno – Farense – 2024–2025
- Pablo Moreno – Marítimo – 2022–2023
- Dani Morer – Famalicão – 2020–2021, Moreirense – 2024–2025
- **Nils Mortimer** – **Académico Viseu** – 2026–
- Rafa Mújica – Arouca – 2022–2024
- **Fran Navarro** – Gil Vicente – 2021–2023, Porto – 2023–2025, **Braga** – 2024–
- Aarón Ñíguez – Braga – 2015–2016
- Nolito – Benfica – 2011–2013
- Rafael Obrador – Benfica – 2025–2026
- Roberto Olabe – Tondela – 2020–2021
- Jandro Orellana – Estoril – 2024–2027
- Pedro Ortiz – Vizela – 2022–2024
- Juanto Ortuño – Belenenses – 2015–2018
- Raúl Parra – Estoril – 2023–2024
- **Alfonso Pastor** – **Marítimo** – 2026–
- **Gonzalo Pastor** – **Famalicão** – 2025–
- **Marcos Peña** – **Famalicão** – 2025–
- Ivan Peñaranda – Santa Clara – 2002–2003
- Pepelu – Tondela – 2019–2020, Vitória de Guimarães – 2020–2021
- Pepin – Marítimo – 2002–2003
- Juan Antonio Pizzi – Porto – (2000)–2001
- Pedro Porro – Sporting CP – 2020–2023
- Darío Poveda – Farense – 2024–2025
- **Miguel Puche** – **Arouca** – 2023–
- José Puntas – União da Madeira – 2001–2002, Paços de Ferreira – 2002–2004
- Xavi Quintillà – Santa Clara – 2022–2023
- Raúl – Chaves – 1996–1998
- José Antonio Reyes – Benfica – 2008–2009
- **Óscar Rivas** – **Vitória de Guimarães** – 2024–
- António Segura Robaina – Sporting CP – 1999–2000
- Roberto – Benfica – 2010–2011
- **Joel Robles** – **Estoril** – 2024–
- Rodri – Farense – 2000–2002, Gil Vicente – 2002–2003
- **Rodri** – **Moreirense** – 2025–
- Rodrigo – Benfica – 2011–2014
- Joan Román – Braga – 2015–2016, Nacional – 2015–2016
- Oriol Rosell – Sporting CP – 2014–2015, Vitória de Guimarães – 2015–2016, Belenenses – 2016–2017, Portimonense – 2017–2018
- Abel Ruiz – Braga – 2019–2024
- Jorge Sáenz – Marítimo – 2021–2022
- **Borja Sainz** – **Porto** – 2025–
- Israel Salazar – Estoril – 2024–2025
- **Javi Sánchez** – **Arouca** – 2025–
- **Ricard Sánchez** – **Estoril** – 2025–
- **Yellu Santiago** – Arouca – 2025–2026, **Marítimo** – 2026–
- Pablo Sarabia – Sporting CP – 2021–2022
- Jesús Seba – Chaves – 1998–1999, Belenenses – 1999–2002
- **Ismael Sierra** – **Estoril** – 2026–
- **Xavi Sintes** – **Estoril** – 2026–
- Arnau Solà – Arouca – 2025–2026
- Carles Soria – Estoril – 2021–2022
- Alberto Soro – Vizela – 2023–2024
- Max Svensson – Casa Pia – 2024–2026
- **Toni Tamarit** – **Alverca** – 2026–
- Cedric Teguia – Moreirense – 2024–2026
- **Martín Tejón** – **Marítimo** – 2026–
- Cristian Tello – Porto – 2014–2016
- Toñito – Vitória de Setúbal – 1997–1999, Sporting CP – 1999–2001, 2002–2004, Santa Clara – 2001–2002, Boavista – 2004–2005, União de Leiria – 2007–2008
- Toñito – Chaves – 1994–1996, 1997–2000, Vitória de Guimarães – 1996–1997
- Óliver Torres – Porto – 2014–2015, 2016–2019
- Víctor Torres Mestre – Varzim – 2001–2002
- Tote – Benfica – 1999–2000
- Iker Undabarrena – Tondela – 2021–2022
- Iker Unzueta – Vizela – 2023–2024
- Eugeni Valderrama – Arouca – 2021–2022
- Francisco Varela – Belenenses SAD – 2019–2020
- **Gabri Veiga** – **Porto** – 2025–
- **Pau Víctor** – **Braga** – 2025–
- **Fran Vieites** – **Marítimo** – 2026–
- Viqueira – Campomaiorense – 1997–1998
- Kevin Villodres – Gil Vicente – 2022–2023
- Waldo – Campomaiorense – 1998–2000
- Yonathan – Estrela da Amadora – 2006–2008
- Alberto Zapater – Sporting CP – 2010–2011
- Antonio Zarzana – Marítimo – 2022–2023
- Eñaut Zubikarai – Tondela – 2015–2016

== Suriname ==
- Darl Douglas – Marítimo – 2006–2007
- Leandro Kappel – Braga – 2013–2014

== Sweden ==
- Robert Åhman Persson – Belenenses – 2016–2018
- Anders Andersson – Benfica – 2001–2004, Belenenses – 2004–2005
- Erik Torsten Andersson – Estrela da Amadora – 1996–1997
- **Victor Andersson** – **Vitória de Guimarães** – 2026–
- Nicklas Bärkroth – União de Leiria – 2011–2012
- Michael Brundin – Vitória de Setúbal – 1994–1995, Campomaiorense – 1995–1996
- **Samuel Dahl** – **Benfica** – 2024–
- Leonardo de Oliveira – Famalicão – 2024–2025
- Lars Eriksson – Porto – 1995–1998
- Hans Eskilsson – Sporting CP – 1988–1989, Braga – 1989–1991, Estoril – 1991–1992
- Pontus Farnerud – Sporting CP – 2006–2008
- Tobias Grahn – Beira-Mar – 1998–1999
- Viktor Gyökeres – Sporting CP – 2023–2025
- Martin Holmberg – Boavista – 1987–1990
- **Kevin Höög Jansson** – **Estrela da Amadora** – 2025–
- Yahya Kalley – Estrela da Amadora – 2025–2026
- **Gustaf Lagerbielke** – **Braga** – 2025–
- Victor Lindelöf – Benfica – 2013–2014, 2015–2017
- Viktor Lundberg – Marítimo – 2017–2018
- Benny Mårtensson – Farense – 1984–1985
- Benjamin Mbunga Kimpioka – Tondela – 2025–2026
- Joe Mendes – Braga – 2022–2025
- Alexander Östlund – Vitória de Guimarães – 1998–1999
- Ulf Ottosson – Chaves – 1996
- Martin Pringle – Benfica – 1996–1999
- Jonny Rödlund – Braga – 1995–1997
- Stefan Schwarz – Benfica – 1991–1994
- Fredrik Söderström – Vitória de Guimarães – 1996–2001, Porto – 2001–2002, Braga – 2003–2004
- Glenn Strömberg – Benfica – 1983–1984
- Jonas Thern – Benfica – 1989–1992
- Tim Waker – Marítimo – 2020–2022

== Switzerland ==
- Zeki Amdouni – Benfica – 2024–2025
- **Adrian Bajrami** – Benfica – 2024–2025, **Braga** – 2026–
- Diego Benaglio – Nacional – 2005–2008
- **Roméo Beney** – **Famalicão** – 2025–
- Loris Benito – Benfica – 2014–2015
- Rubén del Campo – Famalicão – 2019–2021
- **Maxime Dominguez** – Gil Vicente – 2023–2025, **Marítimo** – 2026–
- Gélson Fernandes – Sporting CP – 2012–2013
- Johnny Leoni – Marítimo – 2013–2014
- Alessandro Mangiarratti – Belenenses – 2003–2005
- **Leny Meyer** – **Famalicão** – 2026–
- Haris Seferovic – Benfica – 2017–2022
- Bastien Toma – Paços de Ferreira – 2022–2023

== Syria ==
- George Mourad – Portimonense – 2010–2011
- Pablo Sabbag – Tondela – 2018–2019

== Tanzania ==
- Raul Neves Chipenda – Belenenses – 1995–1996, Vitória de Setúbal – 1996–2003

== Timor-Leste ==
- Alfaia – Leça – 1995–1998
- Joca – Braga, Riopele – 1969, 1976, 1977–1978
- Pelézinho – Académico de Viseu – 1978–1979
- Pincho – Belenenses – 1973–1977
- Rogério – Olhanense – 1963–1964

== Togo ==
- Kennedy Boateng – Santa Clara – 2021–2023
- Kévin Boma – Estoril – 2024–2026
- **Sebastian Clemmensen** – **Rio Ave** – 2026–
- Emmanuel Hackman – Boavista – 2015–2016, Portimonense – 2017–2020, Gil Vicente – 2021–2023
- Francis Koné – Olhanense – 2013–2014
- Hakim Ouro-Sama – Belenenses SAD – 2019–2020

== Trinidad and Tobago ==
- Russell Latapy – Académica – 1990–1994, Porto – 2004–2006, Boavista – 1996–1998
- Leonson Lewis – Académica – 1990–1994, Felgueiras – 1995–1996, Boavista – 1996–1997, Chaves – 1997–1998, Estrela da Amadora – 1998–2000
- Clint Marcelle – Vitória de Setúbal – 1992–1993, Felgueiras – 1994–1996
- Aurtis Whitley – Vitória de Setúbal – 1997–1998

== Tunisia ==
- Elias Achouri – Estoril – 2022–2023
- Larry Azouni – Nacional – 2020–2021
- Tijani Belaïd – Moreirense – 2012–2013
- Selim Benachour – Vitória de Guimarães – 2005–2006, Marítimo – 2010–2012
- **Chiheb Labidi** – **Nacional** – 2024–
- Lassad Nouioui – Arouca – 2013–2014
- **Motez Nourani** – **Nacional** – 2025–

== Turkey ==
- Kerem Aktürkoğlu – Benfica – 2024–2026
- Emrah Başsan – Vitória de Setúbal – 2017–2018
- Sinan Bolat – Arouca – 2016–2017
- Deniz Gül – Porto – 2024–2027
- **Cihan Kahraman** – **Académico Viseu** – 2026–
- Orkun Kökçü – Benfica – 2023–2025
- Serdar Saatçı – Braga – 2022–2024
- Fatih Sonkaya – Porto – 2005–2006, Académica – 2006–2007
- **Demir Ege Tıknaz** – Rio Ave – 2024–2025, **Braga** – 2025–
- Atila Turan – Beira-Mar – 2011–2012
- Güven Yalçın – Arouca – 2024–2025

== Uganda ==
- Alex Kakuba – Estoril – 2014–2016, Feirense – 2016–2018
- Luwagga Kizito – Rio Ave – 2015–2017

== Ukraine ==
- Serhiy Atelkin – Boavista – 1998–1999
- Valeriy Bondarenko – Vitória de Guimarães – 2019–2020
- Serhiy Kandaurov – Benfica – 1997–2001
- **Orest Lebedenko** – Vizela – 2023–2024, Vitória de Guimarães – 2025–2026, **Arouca** – 2026–
- Bohdan Milovanov – Arouca – 2022–2024
- Serhiy Shcherbakov – Sporting CP – 1992–1994
- **Heorhiy Sudakov** – **Benfica** – 2025–
- **Anatoliy Trubin** – **Benfica** – 2023–
- Dmytro Yarchuk – Estoril – 2016–2017
- Roman Yaremchuk – Benfica – 2021–2023

== United States ==
- Freddy Adu – Benfica – 2007–2008, Belenenses – 2009–2010
- Alejandro Alvarado Jr. – Vizela – 2021–2023
- Gboly Ariyibi – Boavista – 2024–2025
- Tyler Boyd – Vitória de Guimarães – 2015–2016, 2018–2019, Tondela – 2017–2018
- John Brooks – Benfica – 2022–2023
- Reggie Cannon – Boavista – 2020–2023
- Kenny Cooper – Académica – 2004–2005
- Jovan Kirovski – Sporting CP – 2000–2001
- Alex Mendez – Vizela – 2021–2024
- Benji Michel – Arouca – 2022–2024
- Oguchi Onyewu – Sporting CP – 2011–2012
- **Korede Osundina** – **Casa Pia** – 2024–
- Keaton Parks – Benfica – 2017–2018
- Caleb Patterson-Sewell – Vitória de Setúbal – 2012–2013, Gil Vicente – 2014–2015
- Jordan Pefok – Tondela – 2025–2026
- Joel Soñora – Marítimo – 2022–2023

== Uruguay ==
- Rodrigo Abascal – Boavista – 2021–2025, Vitória de Guimarães – 2025–2026
- Carlos Aguiar – Académica – 2008–2009
- Luis Aguiar – Estrela da Amadora – (2007)–2008, Académica – 2007–(2008), Braga – 2008–2011
- Emiliano Albín – Arouca – 2015–2016
- Jonathan Álvez – Vitória de Guimarães – 2014–2015
- **Maximiliano Araújo** – **Sporting CP** – 2024–
- Jean Barrientos – Vitória de Guimarães – 2011–2014
- Juan Manuel Boselli – Tondela – 2021–2022, Gil Vicente – 2022–2023
- Carlos Bueno – Sporting CP – 2006–2007
- Gonzalo Bueno – União Madeira – (2015)–2016
- Erick Cabaco – Estoril – 2023–2024
- Matías Cabrera – Estoril – 2014–2015
- Sebastián Coates – Sporting CP – 2015–2024
- **Ignacio de Arruabarrena** – **Arouca** – 2022–2024, 2025–
- Alejandro Díaz – Porto – 1996–1999
- Álvaro Fernández – Vitória de Setúbal – 2009–2010
- **Martín Fernández** – **Gil Vicente** – 2025–
- Jorge Fucile – Porto – 2006–2012, 2013–2014
- Tiago Galletto – AVS – 2024–2026
- Mauro Goicoechea – Arouca – 2014–2015
- Cristian González – Santa Clara – 2020–2023
- Thiago Helguera – Braga – 2024–2025
- Franco Israel – Sporting CP – 2022–2025
- Marcelo Lipatin – Marítimo – 2006–2007, Nacional – 2007–2008, Trofense – 2008–2009
- **Brian Mansilla** – **Arouca** – 2024–
- Enzo Martínez – Tondela – 2020–2021
- Rodrigo Mora – Benfica – 2011–2012
- **Agustín Moreira** – **Gil Vicente** – 2025–
- **Dylan Nandín** – **Arouca** – 2024–
- Darwin Núñez – Benfica – 2020–2022
- Pablo Olivera – Moreirense – 2012–2013
- Horacio Peralta – Académica – (2007)–2008
- Álvaro Pereira – Porto – 2009–2012
- Maxi Pereira – Benfica – 2007–2015, Porto – 2015–2019
- Richard Porta – Belenenses – 2008–2009
- **Kevin Prieto** – **Casa Pia** – 2025–
- Sebastián Ribas – Sporting CP – 2011–2012
- Matías Rocha – Arouca – 2023–2026
- Cristian Rodríguez – Benfica – 2007–2008, Porto – 2008–2012
- Nacho Rodríguez – AVS – 2024–2025
- Jonathan Rodríguez – Benfica – 2014–2015
- Rodolfo Rodríguez – Sporting CP – 1988–1989
- Nicolás Schiappacasse – Famalicão – 2019–2020
- "Tanque" Silva – Beira-Mar – 2004–2005
- Edgardo Simovic – Marítimo – 1995–1997
- David Texeira – Vitória de Guimarães – 2016–2018, Moreirense – 2018–2020
- **Alfonso Trezza** – **Arouca** – 2023–
- Manuel Ugarte – Famalicão – 2020–2021, Sporting CP – 2021–2023
- Jonathan Urretavizcaya – Benfica – 2008–2010, 2012–2013, Vitória de Guimarães – 2011–2012, Paços de Ferreira – 2014–2015
- Marco Vanzini – Braga – 2003–2004
- Emiliano Velázquez – Braga – 2016–2017
- Gustavo Viera – Santa Clara – 2020–2021
- **Rodrigo Zalazar** – Braga – 2023–2026, **Sporting CP** – 2026–

== Uzbekistan ==
- Sardor Rashidov – Nacional – 2018–2019

== Venezuela ==
- Fernando Aristeguieta – Nacional – 2016–2017
- Breitner – União Madeira – 2015–2016
- Jhonder Cádiz – Vitória de Setúbal – 2018–2019, União da Madeira – 2015–2016, Nacional – 2016–2017, Moreirense – (2017)–2018, Vitória de Setúbal – 2018–2019, Famalicão – 2021–2024
- Alejandro Cichero – Benfica – 1997–1998
- Yonathan Del Valle – Rio Ave – 2012–2015, Paços de Ferreira – 2013–2014
- Fernando de Ornelas – Marítimo – 2002
- Jeriel De Santis – Boavista – 2020–2022, 2023–2024
- Edder Farías – União Madeira – 2015–2016
- Eduardo Fereira – Casa Pia – 2022–2023
- Nahuel Ferraresi – Moreirense – 2020–2021, Estoril – 2021–2022
- Víctor García – Porto – 2014–2015, Nacional – 2016–2017, Vitória de Guimarães – 2017–2018, 2019–2020
- Jesús Hernández – Belenenses – 2017–2018
- Jeffrén – Sporting CP – 2011–2014
- Matías Lacava – Tondela – 2021–2022, Vizela – 2022–2024
- Pedro Lavoura – Académica de Coimbra, Braga – 1997–1999, 1999–2000
- Darwin Machís – Vitória de Guimarães – 2012–2013
- Alejandro Marqués – Estoril – 2022–2026
- Jhon Murillo – Tondela – 2015–2017, 2018–2022
- Yordan Osorio – Tondela – 2016–2018, Porto – 2017–2018, Vitória de Guimarães – 2018–2019
- Ángelo Peña – Braga – 2009–2010, Portimonense – 2010–2011
- Ronaldo Peña – Moreirense – 2017–2018
- Edder Pérez – Marítimo – 2007–2008
- José Antonio Pestana – Marítimo – 2001
- Jesús Ramírez – Marítimo – 2022–2023, Vitória de Guimarães – 2024–2025, Nacional – 2025–2026
- Mario Rondón – Paços de Ferreira – 2009–2011, Nacional – 2011–2015
- Telasco Segovia – Casa Pia – 2023–2025
- Jeffrén Suárez – Sporting CP – 2011–2013
- Jefre Vargas – Arouca – 2016–2017
- Renny Vega – União Madeira – 2015–2016
- José Manuel Velázquez – Arouca – 2015–2017, 2021–2023
- Mikel Villanueva – Santa Clara – 2020–2022, Vitória de Guimarães – 2022–2025

== Vietnam ==
- Lê Công Vinh – Leixões – 2009–2010

== Wales ==
- Andy Marriott – Beira-Mar – 2003–2004
- Mark Pembridge – Benfica – 1998–1999
- Dean Saunders – Benfica – 1998–1999

== Zambia ==
- Rainford Kalaba – União de Leiria – 2009–2010
- Collins Mbesuma – Marítimo – 2006–2007
- Perry Mutapa – Farense – 1998–2000
- **Chipyoka Songa** – **Moreirense** – 2026–

== Notes ==
1. Born in Albania
2. Born in Algeria
3. Born in Argentina
4. Born in Australia
5. Born in Austria
6. Born in Austria (then part of Austria-Hungary)
7. Born in Azerbaijan (then part of Soviet Union)
8. Born in Belgium
9. Born in Bosnia and Herzegovina
10. Born in Bosnia and Herzegovina (then part of SFR Yugoslavia)
11. Born in Brazil
12. Born in Cameroon
13. Born in Cape Verde
14. Born in Colombia
15. Born in Croatia (then part of SFR Yugoslavia)
16. Born in the Democratic Republic of Congo (then Zaïre)
17. Born in Denmark
18. Born in Djibouti
19. Born in England
20. Born in Equatorial Guinea
21. Born in France
22. Born in the French Guiana (Overseas department of the French Republic)
23. Born in Germany
24. Born in Ghana
25. Born in Greece
26. Born in Guyana
27. Born in Italy
28. Born in Ivory Coast
29. Born in Kenya
30. Born in Kosovo (then part of SFR Yugoslavia)
31. Born in Lebanon
32. Born in Liberia
33. Born in Montenegro (then part of SFR Yugoslavia)
34. Born in the Netherlands
35. Born in New Zealand
36. Born in Nigeria
37. Born in Norway
38. Born in Paraguay
39. Born in Portugal
40. Born in Republic of Macedonia (then part of SFR Yugoslavia)
41. Born in Réunion (Overseas department of the French Republic)
42. Born in Russia (then part of the Soviet Union)
43. Born in Scotland
44. Born in Senegal
45. Born in Serbia (then part of SFR Yugoslavia)
46. Born in Slovenia (then part of SFR Yugoslavia)
47. Born in Spain
48. Born in Suriname (then part of the Kingdom of the Netherlands)
49. Born in Sweden
50. Born in Switzerland
51. Born in Tanzania
52. Born in the United States of America
53. Capped for the Albania national football team
54. Capped for the Albania national under-21 football team
55. Capped for the Albania national under-19 football team
56. Capped for the Albania national under-17 football team
57. Capped for the Argentina national football team
58. Capped for the Argentina national under-20 football team
59. Capped for the Argentina national under-17 football team
60. Capped for the Belgium national football team
61. Capped for the Belgium national under-21 football team
62. Capped for the Belgium national under-19 football team
63. Capped for the Belgium national under-18 football team
64. Capped for the Belgium national under-17 football team
65. Capped for the Belgium national under-16 football team
66. Capped for the Belgium national under-15 football team
67. Capped for the Bosnia and Herzegovina national under-17 football team
68. Capped for the Brazil national under-17 football team
69. Capped for the Catalonia national football team
70. Capped for the Croatia national under-21 football team
71. Capped for the Croatia national under-19 football team
72. Capped for the DR Congo national football team
73. Capped for the England national under-21 football team
74. Capped for the England national under-20 football team
75. Capped for the England national under-19 football team
76. Capped for the England national under-18 football team
77. Capped for the England national under-17 football team
78. Capped for the England national under-16 football team
79. Capped for the England national under-15 football team
80. Capped for the France national football team
81. Capped for the France Olympic football team
82. Capped for the France national under-21 football team
83. Capped for the France national under-20 football team
84. Capped for the France national under-19 football team
85. Capped for the France national under-18 football team
86. Capped for the France national under-17 football team
87. Capped for the France national under-16 football team
88. Capped for the Galicia national football team
89. Capped for the Germany national under-21 football team
90. Capped for the Germany national under-20 football team
91. Capped for the Germany national under-19 football team
92. Capped for the Germany national under-18 football team
93. Capped for the Germany national under-17 football team
94. Capped for the Germany national under-16 football team
95. Capped for the Germany national under-15 football team
96. Capped for the Italy national under-20 football team
97. Capped for the Ivory Coast national under-20 football team
98. Capped for the Martinique national football team
99. Capped for the Netherlands national football team
100. Capped for the Netherlands national under-21 football team
101. Capped for the Netherlands national under-20 football team
102. Capped for the Netherlands national under-19 football team
103. Capped for the Netherlands national under-18 football team
104. Capped for the Netherlands national under-17 football team
105. Capped for the Netherlands national under-16 football team
106. Capped for the Netherlands national under-15 football team
107. Capped for the New Zealand national football team
108. Capped for the New Zealand national under-20 football team
109. Capped for the Portugal national football team
110. Capped for the Portugal national football B team
111. Capped for the Portugal Olympic football team
112. Capped for the Portugal national under-23 football team
113. Capped for the Portugal national under-21 football team
114. Capped for the Portugal national under-20 football team
115. Capped for the Portugal national under-19 football team
116. Capped for the Portugal national under-18 football team
117. Capped for the Portugal national under-17 football team
118. Capped for the Portugal national under-16 football team
119. Capped for the Portugal national under-15 football team
120. Capped for the Russia national under-21 football team
121. Capped for the Russia national under-20 football team
122. Capped for the Russia national under-19 football team
123. Capped for the Russia national under-18 football team
124. Capped for the Scotland national under-21 football team
125. Capped for the Scotland national under-19 football team
126. Capped for the Senegal national under-17 football team
127. Capped for the Spain national under-21 football team
128. Capped for the Spain national under-20 football team
129. Capped for the Spain national under-19 football team
130. Capped for the Spain national under-17 football team
131. Capped for the Spain national under-16 football team
132. Capped for the Spain national under-15 football team
133. Capped for the Sweden men's national football team
134. Capped for the Sweden national under-21 football team
135. Capped for the Sweden men's national under-19 football team
136. Capped for the Switzerland national under-21 football team
137. Capped for the Switzerland national under-20 football team
138. Capped for the Switzerland national under-19 football team
139. Capped for the Switzerland national under-18 football team
140. Capped for the Turkey national under-21 football team
141. Capped for the United States national under-23 football team
142. Capped for the United States national under-20 football team
143. Capped for the United States national under-18 football team
144. Capped for the United States national under-17 football team
