= 2024–25 AVS Futebol SAD season =

AVS Futebol SAD
2024–25 season
- Head coach: Vítor Campelos (until 12 November); Daniel Ramos (15 November–10 February)
- Stadium: Estádio do Clube Desportivo das Aves
- Primeira Liga: 16th
- Taça de Portugal: Pre-season
- Top goalscorer: John Mercado; Kiki Afonso; Nenê (1 each)
- Average home league attendance: 2,407
- Biggest win: AVS 1–0 Vitória de Guimarães
- Biggest defeat: Gil Vicente 4–2 AVS

The 2024–25 season is the second season in the history of the AVS Futebol SAD, and their debut season in Primeira Liga. In addition to the domestic league, the team will participate in the Taça de Portugal.

== Transfers ==
=== In ===
Pos.	Player	Transferred from	Fee	Date	Source
DF	(Portugal) Rafael Rodrigues	(Portugal) Benfica B	Loan	9 July 2024	
DF	(Portugal) Kiki Afonso	(Russia) FC Ural	Free	13 July 2024	
DF	(France) Baptiste Roux	(France) Guingamp	Free	18 July 2024	
DF	(Colombia) Cristian Devenish	(Colombia) Atlético Nacional	Free	19 July 2024	
MF	(Georgia (country)) Giorgi Aburjania	(Turkey) Hatayspor	Undisclosed	23 July 2024	
MF	(Brazil) Lucas Piazon	(Portugal) Braga	Free	25 July 2024	
DF	(Uruguay) Ignacio Rodríguez	(Uruguay) Liverpool FC	Loan	26 July 2024	
GK	(Mexico) Guillermo Ochoa	Unattached	Free	2 September 2024	

=== Out ===
Pos.	Player	Transferred to	Fee	Date	Source
MF	(Portugal) João Amorim	(Portugal) Fafe		1 July 2024	
FW	(Ivory Coast) Balla Sangaré	(Qatar) Lusail SC	Loan	3 July 2024	
DF	(France) Anthony Correia	(Portugal) Vizela		17 July 2024	
FW	(Brazil) Talles Wander	(Portugal) Torreense	Loan	27 July 2024	

== Friendlies ==
=== Pre-season ===
6 July 2024 Friendly	AVS (Portugal)	13–1	(Portugal) AMCH Ringe	Vila das Aves
10:00 UTC+1	Samuel Granada; Nenê; Mena; Luís Silva; Talles Wander; Carlos Daniel	Report		Stadium: Estádio do CD Aves
Note: Behind closed doors

10 July 2024 Friendly	AVS (Portugal)	4–1	(Portugal) Os Sandinenses
19:00 UTC+1	Clayton Sampaio; Carlos Daniel		David Castro 50'
Note: Two periods of 40 minutes

13 July 2024 Friendly	AVS (Portugal)	2–1	(Portugal) Varzim SC	Vila das Aves
13:00 UTC+1	Léo Alaba; Mena		Rodrigo Freitas	Stadium: Estádio do CD Aves
Note: Two periods of 40 minutes

17 July 2024 Friendly	AVS (Portugal)	3–0	(Portugal) Oliveirense	Vila das Aves
10:30 UTC+1	Léo Alaba 7'; Mena 14'; Nenê 35'	Report
Note: 2 x 35 minutes

20 July 2024 Friendly	Trofense (Portugal)	1–1	(Portugal) AVS
18:30 UTC+1	34'		47'

24 July 2024 Friendly	Porto B (Portugal)	2–1	(Portugal) AVS	Centro de Treinos do Olival
12:30	Abraham Marcus; Luís Mota	Report	Nenê

27 July 2024 Friendly	AVS (Portugal)	0–0	(Spain) Sporting Gijón	Vila das Aves
11:00 UTC+1

31 July 2024 Friendly	AVS (Portugal)	6–1	(Spain) CD Arenteiro
11:00 UTC+1

3 August 2024 Friendly	AVS (Portugal)	1–0	(Spain) Racing de Ferrol
19:00 UTC+1	Nenê 9'

== Competitions ==
=== Overall record ===
Competition	First match	Last match	Starting round	Record							
Competition	First match	Last match	Starting round	Pld	W	D	L	GF	GA	GD	Win %
Primeira Liga	10 August 2024	May 2025	Matchday 1	15	2	7	6	11	22	−11	13.33
Taça de Portugal	20 October 2024	23 November 2025	Round 3	2	1	0	1	4	3	+1	50.00
Total				17	3	7	7	15	25	−10	17.65

Last updated: 24 December 2024
Source: Soccerway

=== Primeira Liga ===
==== League table ====
Pos	Team	Pld	W	D	L	GF	GA	GD	Pts	Qualification or relegation
14	Nacional	34	9	7	18	32	50	−18	34	
15	Estrela da Amadora	34	7	8	19	24	50	−26	29	
16	AVS (O)	34	5	12	17	25	60	−35	27 (Note: Head to head points: AVS 4, Farense 1.)	Qualification for the relegation play-offs
17	Farense (R)	34	6	9	19	25	46	−21	27	Relegation to Liga Portugal 2
18	Boavista (D, R)	34	6	6	22	24	59	−35	24	Administrative relegation to Porto Football Association

Source: Liga Portugal
Rules for classification: 1) Points; 2) Head-to-head points; 3) Head-to-head goal difference; 4) Goal difference; 5) Matches won; 6) Goals scored; 7) Play-off.
(D) Disqualified; (O) Play-off winners; (R) Relegated

==== Matches ====
The match schedule was released on 7 July 2024.

10 August 2024 1	AVS	1–1	Nacional	Aves
15:30	Mercado 56'; Nenê (yellow card) 83'	Report	Baeza 35'; Ulisses (yellow card) 46'	Stadium: Estádio do CD Aves; Attendance: 1,596; Referee: André Narciso

16 August 2024 2	Gil Vicente	4–2	AVS	Barcelos
20:15	Aguirre 37'; Zé Carlos (yellow card) 63'; Fujimoto 41', 90+4' (pen.), 90+6'	Report	Afonso 32'; Granada (yellow card) 34' (yellow-red card) 61'; Nenê 45+3'; Clayton (yellow card) 63'; Teixeira (yellow card) 90+3'; Devenish (yellow card) 90+9'	Stadium: Estádio Cidade de Barcelos; Attendance: 3,649; Referee: Bruno José Costa

25 August 2024 3	AVS	1-0	Vitória de Guimarães	Aves
20:30	Lucca (yellow card) 30'; Kiki (yellow card) 46'; Nenê 74'; Simão (yellow card) 90+6'; Mena (yellow card) 90+7'	Report	Villanueva (yellow card) 82'; Silva (yellow card) 85'; Santos (yellow card) 88'	Stadium: Estádio do CD Aves; Attendance: 4,485; Referee: João Pinheiro

31 August 2024 4	Santa Clara	2-1	AVS	Ponta Delgada
15:30	Silva 24'; Vasco Matos (yellow card) 45+4'; Safira 57'; Soares (yellow card) 72'	Report	Grau 34'; Léo Alaba (yellow card) 57'; Mena (yellow card) 86'	Stadium: Estádio de São Miguel; Attendance: 1,935; Referee: Miguel Nogueira

14 September 2024 5	AVS	1-0	Rio Ave	Aves
18:00	Grau (yellow card) 15'; Assunção (yellow card) 47'; Lopes 72', (yellow card) 72'; Ochoa (yellow card) 85'	Report	Panzo (yellow card) 26'; William (yellow card) 90+3'	Stadium: Estádio do Clube Desportivo das Aves; Attendance: 2,151; Referee: António Nobre

22 September 2024 6	Sporting CP	3-0	AVS	Lisbon
20:30	Harder 15'; Gyökeres 45+4', 70'	Report	Roux (yellow card) 39'; Devenish (yellow card) 51'; Assunção (yellow card) 65'	Stadium: Estádio José Alvalade; Attendance: 43,039; Referee: Ricardo Baixinho

30 September 2024 7	AVS	0-0	Farense	Aves
20:15	Grau (yellow card) 21'; Assunção (yellow card) 22'; Lopes (yellow card) 64'; Piazón (yellow card) 71'; Correia (red card) 90+4'	Report	Áfrico (yellow card) 40'; Jorge (yellow card) 45'; Barbosa (yellow card) 65'	Stadium: Estádio do Clube Desportivo das Aves; Attendance: 1,615; Referee: Fábio Veríssimo

5 October 2024 8	Arouca	1-1	AVS	Arouca
18:00	Ivo Rodrigues (yellow card) 7'; Jason 30'; Simão (yellow card) 59'; Fontán (yellow card) 75'	Report	Silva (yellow card) 45+2'; Assunção 77' (pen.); Fonseca (yellow card) 87'	Stadium: Estádio Municipal de Arouca; Attendance: 1,113; Referee: David Silva

28 October 2024 9	AVS	0-5	Porto	Aves
20:15	Assunção (yellow card) 41'; Grau (yellow card) 66'	Report	González 22'; Aghehowa 32', 38', 45+1'; Vítor Bruno (yellow card) 42'; Varela (yellow card) 73'; Mora 88'	Stadium: Estádio do Clube Desportivo das Aves; Attendance: 4,795; Referee: Miguel Nogueira

3 November 2024 10	AVS	2-3	Famalicão	Aves
15:30	Lopes 6', (yellow card) 72'; Akinsola 30'; Grau (yellow card) 39'; Roux (yellow card) 50'; Fonseca (yellow card) 90+5'	Report	Aranda 14'; Gil Dias 17', 77', (yellow card) 45+1'	Stadium: Estádio do Clube Desportivo das Aves; Attendance: 2,429; Referee: Luís Godinho

9 November 2024 11	Estoril Praia	0-0	AVS	Estoril
15:30	Holsgrove (yellow card) 83'; Zanocelo (yellow card) 87'	Report		Stadium: Estádio António Coimbra da Mota; Attendance: 1,912; Referee: Gonçalo Neves

1 December 2024 12	AVS	0-1	Braga	Aves
20:30	Fonseca (yellow card) 25'; Teixeira (red card) 76'; Piazón (yellow card) 85'; Grau (yellow card) 86'	Report	Bruma (yellow card) 21'; Martínez 69'	Stadium: Estádio do Clube Desportivo das Aves; Attendance: 2,579; Referee: António Nobre

8 December 2024 13	Casa Pia	1-1	AVS	Rio Maior
18:00	Goulart 12'	Report	Silva (yellow card) 34'; Devenish (yellow card) 49'; Rodríguez (yellow card) 53'; Assunção 72' (pen.), (yellow card) 84'	Stadium: Estádio Municipal de Rio Maior; Attendance: 1,147; Referee: Bruno José Costa

15 December 2024 14	AVS	1-1	Benfica	Aves
18:00	Devenish (yellow card) 45+1', (goal) 90+4'; Fonseca (yellow card) 74'	Report	Amdouni 17'; Cabral (yellow card) 39'; Beste (yellow card) 78'	Stadium: Estádio do Clube Desportivo das Aves; Attendance: 5,473; Referee: João Gonçalves

21 December 2024 15	Boavista FC	0-0	AVS	Porto
18:00	Vukotić (yellow card) 73'	Report	Mendonça (yellow card) 42'; Kiki (yellow card) 55'	Stadium: Estádio do Bessa Século XXI; Attendance: 3,321; Referee: Cláudio Pereira

28 December 2024 16	AVS	1-1	Estrela Amadora	Aves
15:30	Roux 52'	Report	Léo Cordeiro 8'	Stadium: Estádio do Clube Desportivo das Aves; Referee: Pedro Ramalho

4 January 2025 17	Moreirense	1-1	AVS	Braga
15:30	Alan 9' (pen.)	Report	Grau 45'	Stadium: Parque de Jogos Comendador Joaquim de Almeida Freitas; Attendance: 2,327; Referee: Hélder Malheiro

19 January 2025 18	Nacional	3-1	AVS	Madeira
15:30	Bruno Costa 20' (pen.); Dudu 34'; Soumaré 45+6'	Report	Rodrigo Ribeiro 45+3'	Stadium: Estádio da Madeira; Attendance: 2,061; Referee: Hélder Carvalho

27 January 2025 19	AVS	1-0	Gil Vicente	Aves
20:15	Mercado 55'	Report		Stadium: Estádio do Clube Desportivo das Aves; Attendance: 726; Referee: Anzhony Rodrigues

==== Play-off manutenção/promoção ====
24 May 2025 1st leg	AVS	3–0	Vizela	Aves
19:45 WEST (UTC+01:00)	Assunção 62' (pen.); Akinsola 67', 70'			Stadium: Estádio do Clube Desportivo das Aves; Attendance: 2,715; Referee: Gustavo Correia

1 June 2025 2nd leg	Vizela	2–2	AVS	Vizela
19:45 WEST (UTC+01:00)	Fonseca 14' (o.g.); Mörschel 77' (pen.)		Akinsola 38'; Assunção 64'	Stadium: Estádio do Futebol Clube de Vizela; Attendance: 4,076; Referee: Miguel Nogueira

=== Taça de Portugal ===
20 October 2024 Third round	Os Sandinenses	0–2	AVS	Guimarães
20:15 WEST (UTC+01:00)	Silva (yellow card) 51'; Fonseca (yellow card) 52'		Zé Luís 48' (pen.); Mercado 66'	Stadium: Complexo Desportivo Dona Maria Teresa; Attendance: - Referee: Carlos Macedo

23 November 2024 Fourth round	Lusitano de Évora	3–2	AVS	Évora
20:00 WEST (UTC+01:00)	Dida 19', 64'; Lopes 33' (pen.); Palancha (yellow card) 42'; Valverde (yellow card) 45+4'		Kiki (yellow card) 18'; Grau (yellow card) 23'; Simão (yellow card) 31'; Nenê 42'; Assunção (yellow card) 42' (yellow-red card) 57'; Zé Luís 90+4'	Stadium: Campo da Estrela; Attendance: - Referee: Ricardo Baixinho

=== Trofeo Ciudad de Valladolid ===
14 November 2024
19:00

Real Valladolid	2–0	AVS
André 4', 23'	Report

Estadio José Zorrilla, Valladolid
Attendance: 3,212
Referee: De la Fuente Ramos
