= 2023–24 C.F. Estrela da Amadora season =

C.F. Estrela da Amadora
2023–24 season
- Stadium: Estádio José Gomes
- Primeira Liga: 15th
- Taça de Portugal: Pre-season
- Taça da Liga: First round

The 2023–24 season is C.F. Estrela da Amadora's 4th season in existence and first ever in the Primeira Liga, the top division of association football in Portugal. They are also competing in the Taça de Portugal and the Taça da Liga.

== Players ==
=== First-team squad ===
As of 11 August 2023

Note: Flags indicate national team as defined under FIFA eligibility rules; some limited exceptions apply. Players may hold more than one non-FIFA nationality.

No.	Pos.	Nation	Player
1	GK	POR	António Filipe
2	DF	KEN	Johnstone Omurwa
4	DF	ANG	Kialonda Gaspar
6	MF	BRA	Aloísio
7	FW	BFA	Regis Ndo
8	FW	BRA	Léo Jabá (on loan from São Bernardo)
9	FW	POR	Ronaldo Tavares
10	FW	ANG	Capita
11	FW	BRA	Gustavo Henrique
12	DF	BRA	Jean Felipe
13	DF	POR	Miguel Lopes (Captain)
14	DF	BRA	Erivaldo Almeida
17	MF	POR	João Reis
18	MF	POR	Vitó
21	MF	POR	Pedro Sá
22	MF	BRA	Léo Cordeiro

No.	Pos.	Nation	Player
23	MF	ANG	Manuel Keliano
25	DF	RSA	Shinga
27	DF	BRA	Hevertton Santos
29	FW	POR	Kikas
30	GK	BRA	Bruno Brigido
32	MF	COL	Sebastián Guzmán
53	FW	GBS	Isnaba Graça
55	FW	BRA	Luan Farias
61	FW	SEN	Alioune Ndour
70	DF	BRA	Mansur
88	MF	ANG	Mário Balbúrdia
90	FW	BRA	Ronald (on loan from Grêmio Anápolis)
98	GK	BRA	Dida
—	FW	COL	Camilo Durán

=== Out on loan ===
Note: Flags indicate national team as defined under FIFA eligibility rules; some limited exceptions apply. Players may hold more than one non-FIFA nationality.

No.	Pos.	Nation	Player
71	DF	BRA	Lucas Rafael (at Red Bull Bragantino until 31 December 2023)

== Transfers ==
=== In ===
Pos.	Player	Transferred from	Fee	Date	Source

=== Out ===
Pos.	Player	Transferred to	Fee	Date	Source

== Pre-season and friendlies ==
Win Draw Loss Fixtures

== Competitions ==
=== Overall record ===
Competition	First match	Last match	Starting round	Final position	Record							
Competition	First match	Last match	Starting round	Final position	Pld	W	D	L	GF	GA	GD	Win %
Primeira Liga	13 August 2023	19 May 2024	Matchday 1		32	6	12	14	32	49	−17	18.75
Taça de Portugal	21 October 2023	24 November 2023			2	1	0	1	2	2	+0	50.00
Taça da Liga	23 July 2023		First round	First round	1	0	0	1	1	3	−2	0.00
Total					35	7	12	16	35	54	−19	20.00

Last updated: 9 May 2024
Source: Soccerway

=== Primeira Liga ===
==== League table ====
Pos	Team	Pld	W	D	L	GF	GA	GD	Pts	Qualification or relegation
12	Gil Vicente	34	9	9	16	42	52	−10	36	
13	Estoril	34	9	6	19	49	58	−9	33 (Note: Head-to-head away goals scored: Estoril 1, Estrela da Amadora 0.)	
14	Estrela da Amadora	34	7	12	15	33	53	−20	33	
15	Boavista	34	7	11	16	39	62	−23	32 (Note: Head-to-head points: Boavista 4, Portimonense 1.)	
16	Portimonense (R)	34	8	8	18	39	72	−33	32	Qualification for the relegation play-offs

Source: Liga Portugal
Rules for classification: 1) Points; 2) Head-to-head points; 3) Head-to-head goal difference; 4) Head-to-head away goals scored; 5) Goal difference; 6) Matches won; 7) Goals scored; 8) Play-off.
(R) Relegated

==== Results summary ====
Overall								Home						Away					
Pld	W	D	L	GF	GA	GD	Pts	W	D	L	GF	GA	GD	W	D	L	GF	GA	GD
32	6	12	14	32	49	−17	30	5	3	8	21	27	−6	1	9	6	11	22	−11

Last updated: 9 May 2024.
Source: Liga Portugal

==== Results by round ====
Round	1	2	3	4	5	6	7	8	9	10	11	12	13	14	15	16	17	18	19	20	21	22	23
Ground	H	A	H	A	H	A	H	A	H	A	H	A	H	A	H	H	A	A	H	A	H	A	H
Result	L	L	W	D	L	D	L	W	W	L	L	D	W	D	L	D	D	L	L	L	W	L	
Position	15	15	14	13	15	14	15	11	9	10	12	12	9	9	11	11	11	13	15	16	14	16	

Updated to match(es) played on 17 February 2024. Source: Liga Portugal
A = Away; H = Home; W = Win; D = Draw; L = Loss

==== Matches ====
The league fixtures were unveiled on 5 July 2023.

13 August 2023 1	Estrela da Amadora	0–1	Vitória de Guimarães	Amadora
18:00 UTC+1	Lopes (red card) 20'; Reis (yellow card) 90+4'; Jabá (yellow card) 90+5'; Kikas (yellow card) 90+4'	Report	Zé Carlos (yellow card) 19'; João Silva 24'; Gaspar (yellow card) 62'; André (yellow card) 70'	Stadium: Estádio José Gomes; Attendance: 4,300; Referee: Manuel Oliveira

19 August 2023 2	Benfica	2–0	Estrela da Amadora	Lisbon
20:30 UTC+1	Neves (yellow card) 37'; Mário (yellow card) 44'; Cabral (yellow card) 50'; Tengstedt 79'; R. Silva 90+3'	Report	Omurwa (yellow card) 11'; Mansur (yellow card) 55'; Hevertton (yellow card) 90+6'	Stadium: Estádio da Luz; Attendance: 58,479; Referee: Gustavo Correia

25 August 2023 3	Estrela da Amadora	v	Estoril	Amadora
20:15 UTC+1				Stadium: Estádio José Gomes

=== Taça da Liga ===
23 July 2023 First round	Portimonense	3–1	Estrela da Amadora	Portimão
20:30 UTC+1		Report		Stadium: Estádio Municipal de Portimão; Attendance: 968; Referee: Ricardo Baixinho
