= 2022–23 C.F. Estrela da Amadora season =

C.F. Estrela da Amadora
2022–23 season
- Head coach: Sérgio Vieira
- Stadium: Estádio José Gomes
- Liga Portugal 2: 2nd
- Taça de Portugal: Second round
- Taça da Liga: Group stage
- Top goalscorer: League: Paulinho (9); All: Paulinho (9)
- Highest home attendance: vs Moreirense FC, 6/5/2023 - 5149 fans
- Lowest home attendance: vs CD Trofense, 8/1/2023 - 1911 fans
- Biggest win: vs CD Feirense 4-1 - 29/1/2023
- Biggest defeat: vs Moreirense, 2-4 - 6/5/2023
- All statistics correct as of 3 February 2023.

The 2022–23 season is the 12th season in the history of C.F. Estrela da Amadora and their second consecutive season in the second division of Portuguese football. The club are participating in the Liga Portugal 2, the Taça de Portugal, and the Taça da Liga. The season covers the period from 1 July 2022 to 30 June 2023.

== Players ==
As of 7 August 2022

Note: Flags indicate national team as defined under FIFA eligibility rules; some limited exceptions apply. Players may hold more than one non-FIFA nationality.

No.	Pos.	Nation	Player
1	GK	POR	António Filipe
2	DF	KEN	Johnstone Omurwa
4	DF	ANG	Kialonda Gaspar
5	DF	SLO	Amir Feratovič
6	DF	BRA	Aloísio
8	MF	ANG	Mário Balbúrdia
9	FW	POR	João Silva
10	FW	ANG	Capita
11	FW	POR	Diogo Salomão
12	DF	BRA	Jean Felipe
13	DF	POR	Miguel Lopes
17	MF	POR	João Reis
18	MF	POR	Vitó
19	FW	BRA	Luan Capanni (on loan from Milan)
20	FW	POR	Ronaldo Tavares

No.	Pos.	Nation	Player
22	GK	POR	Guilherme Fernandes
24	MF	SEN	Latyr Fall
25	DF	RSA	Nkanyiso Shinga
27	DF	BRA	Hevertton Santos
22	FW	POR	Kikas
30	GK	BRA	Bruno Brigido
32	MF	COL	Sebastián Guzmán
22	DF	POR	Rui Correia
51	DF	ANG	Kénio Cabral
52	MF	POR	Smary Piedade
71	DF	BRA	Lucão
77	FW	MLI	Regis Ndo
80	DF	BRA	Erivaldo Almeida
89	FW	BRA	Ronald
99	FW	BRA	Gustavo Henrique

=== Out on loan ===
Note: Flags indicate national team as defined under FIFA eligibility rules; some limited exceptions apply. Players may hold more than one non-FIFA nationality.

No. / Pos. / Nation / Player; — / MF / GBS / Horácio Jau (at Real)	No. / Pos. / Nation / Player; — / FW / POR / João Costa (at Loures)

== Pre-season and friendlies ==
Win Draw Loss Fixtures

20 July 2022 Friendly	Estrela da Amadora (Portugal)	1–3	(Portugal) Estoril	Alcabideche
10:00 WEST (UTC+1)	Aloísio Souza		Franco; Acevedo; Arthur	Stadium: Centro de Excelência do Estoril

30 July 2022 Friendly	Portimonense (Portugal)	2–1	(Portugal) Estrela da Amadora	Portimão
10:00 WEST (UTC+1)	Yago 3'; Welinton Júnior 89'		Papalélé 37'	Stadium: Estádio Dois Irmãos

24 September 2022 Friendly	Estoril (Portugal)	4–2	(Portugal) Estrela da Amadora	Estoril
--:-- WEST (UTC+1)	Marqués; Pinto (o.g.); Geraldes (pen.)	Report	Silva	Stadium: Estádio António Coimbra da Mota

7 December 2022 Friendly	Estrela da Amadora (Portugal)	1–2	(France) Niort	Grândola
14:00 WET (UTC±0)				Stadium: José Mourinho Training Center

== Competitions ==
=== Overall record ===
Competition	First match	Last match	Starting round	Final position	Record							
Competition	First match	Last match	Starting round	Final position	Pld	W	D	L	GF	GA	GD	Win %
Liga Portugal 2	7 August 2022	28 May 2023	Matchday 1		34	16	15	3	55	35	+20	47.06
Taça de Portugal	1 October 2022		Second round	Second round	1	0	1	0	1	1	+0	0.00
Taça da Liga	20 November 2022	17 December 2022	Group stage	Group stage	3	0	1	2	5	8	−3	0.00
Total					38	16	17	5	61	44	+17	42.11

Last updated: 27 November 2022
Source: Soccerway

=== Liga Portugal 2 ===
==== League table ====
Pos	Team	Pld	W	D	L	GF	GA	GD	Pts	Promotion or relegation
1	Moreirense (C, P)	34	24	7	3	77	38	+39	79	Promotion to Primeira Liga
2	Farense (P)	34	21	6	7	57	34	+23	69	Promotion to Primeira Liga
3	Estrela da Amadora (O, P)	34	16	15	3	55	35	+20	63	Qualification to Promotion play-offs
4	Académico de Viseu	34	14	11	9	51	45	+6	53	
5	Porto B (I)	34	14	9	11	48	40	+8	51	

Updated to match(es) played on 28 May 2023. Source: Liga Portugal 2
Rules for classification: 1) Points; 2) Head-to-head points; 3) Head-to-head goal difference; 4) Head-to-head away goals scored; 5) Goal difference; 6) Matches won; 7) Goals scored; 8) Play-off.
(C) Champions; (I) Ineligible for promotion; (O) Play-off winners; (P) Promoted

==== Results summary ====
Overall								Home						Away					
Pld	W	D	L	GF	GA	GD	Pts	W	D	L	GF	GA	GD	W	D	L	GF	GA	GD
34	16	15	3	55	35	+20	63	8	7	2	28	18	+10	8	8	1	27	17	+10

Last updated: 11 june 2023.
Source: Liga Portugal

==== Results by round ====
Round	1	2	3	4	5	6	7	8	9	10	11	12	13	14	15	16	17	18	19	20	21	22	23	24	25	26	27	28	29	30	31	32	33	34
Ground	A	H	A	H	A	H	H	A	H	A	H	A	H	A	H	A	H	H	A	H	A	H	A	A	H	A	H	A	H	A	H	A	H	A
Result	D	D	W	D	D	W	D	L	W	D	D	W	W	D	D	W	W	W	D	W	W	D	D	D	W	W	D	W	W	W	L	D	L	W
Position	9	13	7	7	7	5	6	8	7	8	9	5	4	4	4	4	3	3	3	2	2	2	2	2	2	2	2	2	2	2	3	3	3	3

Updated to match(es) played on 11 june 2023. Source: Liga Portugal
A = Away; H = Home; W = Win; D = Draw; L = Loss

==== Matches ====
The league fixtures were announced on 5 July 2022.

7 August 2022 1	Feirense	1 - 1	Estrela da Amadora	Santa Maria da Feira
11:00	João Paulo (red card) 43'; Jardel 90+3'; Washington (yellow card) 90+5'	Report	Paulinho 62'; Aloísio (yellow card) 85'	Stadium: Estádio Marcolino de Castro; Attendance: 1,565; Referee: (Portugal) Anzhony Rodrigues

13 August 2022 2	Estrela da Amadora	1 - 1	Farense	Seixal
15:30	Paulinho 14'; Kialonda Gaspar (yellow card) 43'; Mário Balbúrdia (yellow card) 61'; Lucão (yellow card) 63'	Report	Róbson (yellow card) 15'; Fabrício Isidoro (yellow card) 36'; Lucão 62'	Stadium: Benfica Campus; Attendance: 821; Referee: (Portugal) Miguel Nogueira

17 August 2022 3	Benfica B	1 - 2	Estrela da Amadora	Seixal
11:00	Gerson Sousa 51'; João Resende (yellow card) 59'	Report	Mário Balbúrdia 10' (yellow card) 78'; Gustavo Henrique 29'; Bruno Brigido (yellow card) 35'; Kialonda Gaspar (yellow card) 84'	Stadium: Benfica Campus; Attendance: 662; Referee: (Portugal) João Pinho
