= André Sousa =

André Sousa may refer to:

- André Sousa (footballer, born 1990), Portuguese football midfielder
- André Sousa (footballer, born 1997), Portuguese football midfielder
- André Sousa (footballer, born 1998), Portuguese football midfielder
- André Sousa (futsal player) (born 1986), Portuguese futsal player
- André Ventura Sousa (born 2000), Portuguese chess player
