= Diogo Fonseca =

Diogo Fonseca may refer to:

- Diogo Fonseca (footballer, born 1984), Portuguese football centre-forward
- Diogo Fonseca (footballer, born 2002), Portuguese football centre-back for Braga
