= 2023–24 S.C. Braga season =

S.C. Braga
2023–24 season
- President: António Salvador
- Head coach: Artur Jorge (until 3 April); Rui Duarte (interim, from 3 April)
- Stadium: Estádio Municipal de Braga
- Primeira Liga: 4th
- Taça de Portugal: Fifth round
- Taça da Liga: Winners
- UEFA Champions League: Group stage
- UEFA Europa League: Knockout round play-offs
- Top goalscorer: League: Simon Banza (21); All: Simon Banza (23)
- Average home league attendance: 15,445
| Home colours | Away colours | Third colours |

The 2023–24 season was the 103nd season in the history of S.C. Braga and their 28th consecutive season in the top flight of Portuguese football. The club participated in the Primeira Liga, Taça de Portugal, Taça da Liga, UEFA Champions League and UEFA Europa League.

On 27 January 2024, Braga defeated Estoril in the final of the Taça da Liga on penalties after a 1–1 draw to claim their third league cup title.

== Players ==
As of 11 August 2023

Note: Flags indicate national team as defined under FIFA eligibility rules; some limited exceptions apply. Players may hold more than one non-FIFA nationality.

| No. | Pos. | Nation | Player |
|---|---|---|---|
| 1 | GK | BRA | Matheus (vice-captain) |
| 2 | DF | ESP | Víctor Gómez |
| 3 | DF | BRA | Vítor Tormena |
| 4 | DF | FRA | Sikou Niakaté |
| 5 | DF | TUR | Serdar Saatçı |
| 6 | DF | POR | José Fonte |
| 7 | FW | POR | Bruma |
| 8 | MF | LBY | Al-Musrati |
| 9 | FW | ESP | Abel Ruiz |
| 10 | MF | POR | André Horta |
| 11 | FW | POR | Roger Fernandes |
| 12 | GK | POR | Tiago Sá |
| 14 | FW | ESP | Álvaro Djaló |

| No. | Pos. | Nation | Player |
|---|---|---|---|
| 15 | DF | POR | Paulo Oliveira |
| 16 | MF | URU | Rodrigo Zalazar |
| 17 | DF | SWE | Joe Mendes |
| 18 | MF | BRA | Vitor Carvalho |
| 19 | DF | ESP | Adrián Marín |
| 20 | MF | POR | Rony Lopes |
| 21 | FW | POR | Ricardo Horta (captain) |
| 22 | MF | POR | Pizzi |
| 23 | FW | COD | Simon Banza |
| 26 | DF | COL | Cristian Borja |
| 28 | MF | POR | João Moutinho |
| 88 | MF | POR | André Castro |
| 91 | GK | CZE | Lukáš Horníček |

=== Other players under contract ===
Note: Flags indicate national team as defined under FIFA eligibility rules; some limited exceptions apply. Players may hold more than one non-FIFA nationality.

| No. | Pos. | Nation | Player |
|---|---|---|---|
| 31 | MF | BRA | Lucas Piazon |
| 47 | DF | POR | Diogo Fonseca |

| No. | Pos. | Nation | Player |
|---|---|---|---|
| — | FW | GNB | Hernâni Infande |

=== Out on loan ===
Note: Flags indicate national team as defined under FIFA eligibility rules; some limited exceptions apply. Players may hold more than one non-FIFA nationality.

| No. | Pos. | Nation | Player |
|---|---|---|---|
| 13 | DF | POR | Tiago Esgaio (at Arouca until 30 June 2024) |
| 25 | MF | BRA | Lucas Mineiro (at Cuiabá until 31 December 2023) |
| 29 | MF | FRA | Jean-Baptiste Gorby (at Paços de Ferreira until 30 June 2024) |
| — | FW | POR | Rodrigo Gomes (at Estoril until 30 June 2024) |

== Competitions ==
=== Overall record ===
| Competition | First match | Last match | Starting round | Final position | Record | | | | | | | |
| Competition | First match | Last match | Starting round | Final position | Pld | W | D | L | GF | GA | GD | Win % |
|---|---|---|---|---|---|---|---|---|---|---|---|---|
| Primeira Liga | 11 August 2023 | 18 May 2024 | Matchday 1 | 4th | 34 | 21 | 5 | 8 | 71 | 50 | +21 | 61.76 |
| Taça de Portugal | 19 October 2023 | 10 January 2024 | Third round | Fifth round | 3 | 2 | 0 | 1 | 8 | 4 | +4 | 66.67 |
| Taça da Liga | 1 November 2023 | 27 January 2024 | Third round | Winners | 4 | 2 | 2 | 0 | 6 | 3 | +3 | 50.00 |
| UEFA Champions League | 8 August 2023 | 12 December 2023 | Third qualifying round | Group stage | 10 | 5 | 1 | 4 | 16 | 14 | +2 | 50.00 |
| UEFA Europa League | 15 February 2024 | 22 February 2024 | Knockout round play-offs | Knockout round play-offs | 2 | 1 | 0 | 1 | 5 | 6 | −1 | 50.00 |
| Total | | | | | 53 | 31 | 8 | 14 | 106 | 77 | +29 | 58.49 |

Source: Liga Portugal

=== Primeira Liga ===
==== League table ====
| Pos | Team | Pld | W | D | L | GF | GA | GD | Pts | Qualification or relegation |
|---|---|---|---|---|---|---|---|---|---|---|
| 2 | Benfica | 34 | 25 | 5 | 4 | 77 | 28 | +49 | 80 | Qualification for the Champions League league phase (Note: Since Atalanta, the winners of the 2023–24 UEFA Europa League, qualified for the Champions League via league position, Benfica was promoted from the Champions League third qualifying round to the league phase, as the team with the highest coefficient out of all the teams in Champions League qualifying.) |
| 3 | Porto | 34 | 22 | 6 | 6 | 63 | 27 | +36 | 72 | Qualification for the Europa League league phase (Note: Porto qualified for the Europa League league phase by winning the 2023–24 Taça de Portugal.) |
| 4 | Braga | 34 | 21 | 5 | 8 | 71 | 50 | +21 | 68 | Qualification for the Europa League second qualifying round (Note: Since the 2023–24 Taça de Portugal winners, Porto, finished in top three, the spot given to the third-placed team (Europa League second qualifying round) was passed to the fourth-placed team, and the spot given to the fourth-placed team (Conference League second qualifying round) was passed to the fifth-placed team.) |
| 5 | Vitória de Guimarães | 34 | 19 | 6 | 9 | 52 | 38 | +14 | 63 | Qualification for the Conference League second qualifying round |
| 6 | Moreirense | 34 | 16 | 7 | 11 | 36 | 35 | +1 | 55 | |

Source: Liga Portugal
Rules for classification: 1) Points; 2) Head-to-head points; 3) Head-to-head goal difference; 4) Head-to-head away goals scored; 5) Goal difference; 6) Matches won; 7) Goals scored; 8) Play-off.

==== Results summary ====
| Overall | | | | | | | | Home | | | | | | Away | | | | | |
| Pld | W | D | L | GF | GA | GD | Pts | W | D | L | GF | GA | GD | W | D | L | GF | GA | GD |
|---|---|---|---|---|---|---|---|---|---|---|---|---|---|---|---|---|---|---|---|
| 34 | 21 | 5 | 8 | 71 | 50 | +21 | 68 | 10 | 3 | 4 | 33 | 20 | +13 | 11 | 2 | 4 | 38 | 30 | +8 |

Source: Liga Portugal

==== Results by round ====
| Round | 1 | 2 | 3 | 4 | 5 | 6 | 7 | 8 | 9 | 10 | 11 | 12 | 13 | 14 | 15 | 16 | 17 | 18 | 19 | 20 | 21 | 22 | 23 | 24 | 25 | 26 | 27 | 28 | 29 | 30 | 31 | 32 | 33 | 34 |
|---|---|---|---|---|---|---|---|---|---|---|---|---|---|---|---|---|---|---|---|---|---|---|---|---|---|---|---|---|---|---|---|---|---|---|
| Ground | H | A | A | H | A | H | A | H | A | H | A | H | A | H | A | H | A | A | H | H | A | H | A | H | A | H | A | H | A | H | A | H | A | H |
| Result | L | W | D | W | L | W | W | W | D | W | W | W | W | L | W | D | L | W | D | W | L | W | W | W | D | W | W | L | W | W | L | W | W | L |
| Position | 13 | 9 | 5 | 6 | 8 | 6 | 5 | 4 | 5 | 4 | 4 | 4 | 4 | 4 | 4 | 4 | 4 | 4 | 4 | 4 | 4 | 4 | 4 | 4 | 4 | 4 | 4 | 4 | 4 | 4 | 4 | 4 | 4 | 4 |
| Points | 0 | 3 | 4 | 7 | 7 | 10 | 13 | 16 | 17 | 20 | 23 | 26 | 29 | 29 | 32 | 33 | 33 | 36 | 37 | 40 | 40 | 43 | 46 | 49 | 50 | 53 | 56 | 56 | 59 | 62 | 62 | 65 | 68 | 68 |

Source: Liga Portugal
A = Away; H = Home; W = Win; D = Draw; L = Loss

==== Matches ====
| 11 August 2023 1 | Braga | 1–2 | Famalicão | Braga |
| 20:15 WEST (UTC+01:00) | R. Horta 9' | Report | Rodrigues 67'; Aranda 90+5' | Stadium: Estádio Municipal de Braga; Attendance: 19,184; Referee: Fábio Veríssimo |

| 19 August 2023 2 | Chaves | 2–4 | Braga | Chaves |
| 18:00 WEST (UTC+01:00) | Héctor 42', 52' | Report | Bruma 16'; R. Horta 58'; Banza 80'; Pizzi 90+5' | Stadium: Estádio Municipal de Chaves; Attendance: 5,443; Referee: João Gonçalves |

| 3 September 2023 4 | Braga | 1–1 | Sporting CP | Braga |
| 20:30 WEST (UTC+01:00) | Djaló 78' | Report | Gonçalves 25' | Stadium: Estádio Municipal de Braga; Attendance: 22,781; Referee: Luís Godinho |

| 9 September 2023 3 | Moreirense | 2–3 | Braga | Moreira de Cónegos |
| 18:00 WEST (UTC+01:00) | Luis 40'; Madson 45+1' | Report | Rony 27'; Banza 82'; Al-Musrati 90+6' | Stadium: Parque Moreira de Cóngeos; Attendance: 2,875; Referee: Cláudio Pereira |

| 16 September 2023 5 | Farense | 3–1 | Braga | Faro |
| 18:00 WEST (UTC+01:00) | Bruno 31'; Costa 44'; Belloumi 58' | Report | Banza 56' | Stadium: Estádio de São Luís; Attendance: 5,006; Referee: António Nobre |

| 24 September 2023 6 | Braga | 4–1 | Boavista | Braga |
| 20:30 WEST (UTC+01:00) | R. Horta 19', 58'; Banza 37'; Al-Musrati 54' (pen.) | Report | Morais 26' | Stadium: Estádio Municipal de Braga; Attendance: 16,394; Referee: Artur Soares Dias |

| 28 September 2023 7 | Estrela Amadora | 2–4 | Braga | Amadora |
| 20:15 WEST (UTC+01:00) | Kikas 75'; Felipe 79' | Report | Djaló 12', 49'; Banza 68'; R. Horta 90+4' | Stadium: Estádio José Gomes; Attendance: 3,630; Referee: Nuno Almeida |

| 7 October 2023 8 | Braga | 2–1 | Rio Ave | Braga |
| 18:00 WEST (UTC+01:00) | Banza 90+1'; A. Ruiz 90+5' | Report | L. Ruiz 5' | Stadium: Estádio Municipal de Braga; Attendance: 16,093; Referee: Manuel Oliveira |

| 28 October 2023 9 | Gil Vicente | 3–3 | Braga | Barcelos |
| 20:30 WEST (UTC+01:00) | Baturina 21'; Dominguez 58'; Wilson 89' | Report | Banza 72'; A. Horta 79', 82' | Stadium: Estádio Cidade de Barcelos; Attendance: 4,504; Referee: Hélder Malheiro |

| 4 November 2023 10 | Braga | 6–1 | Portimonense | Braga |
| 20:30 WET (UTC+0) | R. Horta 47'; Al-Musrati 52' (pen.); Djaló 59'; Banza 83' (pen.), 87', 90' | Report | Pedrão 10' | Stadium: Estádio Municipal de Braga; Attendance: 8,929; Referee: Luís Godinho |

| 12 November 2023 11 | Arouca | 0–1 | Braga | Arouca |
| 18:00 WET (UTC+0) | | Report | Djaló 36' | Stadium: Estádio Municipal de Arouca; Attendance: 1,525; Referee: João Gonçalves |

| 3 December 2023 12 | Braga | 3–1 | Estoril | Braga |
| 15:30 WET (UTC+0) | R. Horta 31'; Banza 51'; Carné 90' (o.g.) | Report | Guitane 24' | Stadium: Estádio Municipal de Braga; Attendance: 12,902; Referee: Bruno Vieira |

| 8 December 2023 13 | Vizela | 1–3 | Braga | Vizela |
| 15:30 WET (UTC+0) | Essende 72' | Report | Banza 15', 56'; Bruma 90+6' | Stadium: Estádio do Vizela; Attendance: 3,785; Referee: Cláudio Pereira |

| 17 December 2023 14 | Braga | 0–1 | Benfica | Braga |
| 20:30 WET (UTC+0) | | Report | Tengstedt 3' | Stadium: Estádio Municipal de Braga; Attendance: 25,532; Referee: Luís Godinho |

| 30 December 2023 15 | Casa Pia | 1–3 | Braga | Rio Maior |
| 18:00 WET (UTC+0) | Clayton 74' | Report | Moutinho 52'; Banza 77'; Zalazar 89' | Stadium: Estádio Municipal de Rio Maior; Attendance: 4,153; Referee: Tiago Martins |

| 6 January 2024 16 | Braga | 1–1 | Vitória de Guimarães | Braga |
| 20:30 WET (UTC+0) | Carvalho 53' | Report | Mendes 90+8' | Stadium: Estádio Municipal de Braga; Attendance: 22,385; Referee: João Pinheiro |

| 14 January 2024 17 | Porto | 2–0 | Braga | Porto |
| 20:30 WET (UTC+0) | Cardoso 12'; Evanilson 48' | Report | | Stadium: Estádio do Dragão; Attendance: 41,402; Referee: Hélder Malheiro |

| 18 January 2024 18 | Famalicão | 1–2 | Braga | Vila Nova de Famalicão |
| 18:45 WET (UTC+0) | Cádiz 62' | Report | Borja 73'; Djaló 90+10' | Stadium: Estádio Municipal 22 de Junho; Attendance: 3,988; Referee: Manuel Oliveira |

| 31 January 2024 19 | Braga | 1–1 | Chaves | Braga |
| 20:45 WET (UTC+0) | Zalazar 52' | Report | Vitória 62' | Stadium: Estádio Municipal de Braga; Attendance: 11,019; Referee: João Gonçalves |

| 4 February 2024 20 | Braga | 1–0 | Moreirense | Braga |
| 20:30 WET (UTC+0) | Ruiz 8' | Report | | Stadium: Estádio Municipal de Braga; Attendance: 12,275; Referee: João Pinheiro |

| 11 February 2024 21 | Sporting CP | 5–0 | Braga | Lisbon |
| 18:00 WET (UTC+0) | Trincão 8'; Quaresma 18'; Gyökeres 70'; Bragança 73'; Santos 85' | Report | | Stadium: Estádio José Alvalade; Attendance: 39,851; Referee: António Nobre |

| 18 February 2024 22 | Braga | 2–1 | Farense | Braga |
| 20:30 WET (UTC+0) | Banza 62'; Ndour 85' | Report | Belloumi 74' | Stadium: Estádio Municipal de Braga; Attendance: 11,270; Referee: André Narciso |

| 26 February 2024 23 | Boavista | 0–4 | Braga | Porto |
| 20:15 WET (UTC+0) | | Report | Banza 42', 62'; Ruiz 44'; Zalazar 72' | Stadium: Estádio do Bessa; Attendance: 8,905; Referee: Gustavo Correia |

| 2 March 2024 24 | Braga | 3–0 | Estrela da Amadora | Braga |
| 20:30 WET (UTC+0) | Banza 58'; Bruma 83'; Fernandes 90+3' | Report | | Stadium: Estádio Municipal de Braga; Attendance: 9,564; Referee: Hélder Malheiro |

| 9 March 2024 25 | Rio Ave | 0–0 | Braga | Vila do Conde |
| 18:00 WET (UTC+0) | | Report | | Stadium: Estádio dos Arcos; Attendance: 2,753; Referee: Fábio Veríssimo |

| 16 March 2024 26 | Braga | 2–1 | Gil Vicente | Braga |
| 18:00 WET (UTC+0) | Ruiz 39'; Banza 90' | Report | Alipour 60' | Stadium: Estádio Municipal de Braga; Attendance: 14,097; Referee: Iancu Vasilica |

| 1 April 2024 27 | Portimonense | 3–5 | Braga | Portimão |
| 20:15 WEST (UTC+01:00) | Pedrão 18'; Pereira 71'; Fukui 86' | Report | Bruma 3', 69'; Fernandes 30'; Banza 49', 61' | Stadium: Estádio Municipal de Portimão; Attendance: 2,204; Referee: Cláudio Pereira |

| 6 April 2024 28 | Braga | 0–3 | Arouca | Braga |
| 18:00 WEST (UTC+01:00) | | Report | Saatçı 29' (o.g.); Mújica 34', 89' | Stadium: Estádio Municipal de Braga; Attendance: 13,031; Referee: João Gonçalves |

| 13 April 2024 29 | Estoril | 0–1 | Braga | Estoril |
| 20:30 WEST (UTC+01:00) | | Report | Djaló 64' | Stadium: Estádio António Coimbra da Mota; Attendance: 3,639; Referee: Fábio Veríssimo |

| 20 April 2024 30 | Braga | 2–1 | Vizela | Braga |
| 20:30 WEST (UTC+01:00) | Zalazar 53', 85' | Report | Essende 50' | Stadium: Estádio Municipal de Braga; Attendance: 12,932; Referee: André Narciso |

| 27 April 2024 31 | Benfica | 3–1 | Braga | Lisbon |
| 18:00 WEST (UTC+01:00) | Marcos Leonardo 71', 90+5'; Neres 85' | Report | Horta 28' | Stadium: Estádio da Luz; Attendance: 55,727; Referee: João Pinheiro |

| 5 May 2024 32 | Braga | 4–3 | Casa Pia | Braga |
| 18:00 WEST (UTC+01:00) | Djaló 12'; Ruiz 60', 88'; Zalazar 64' | Report | Soma 35'; Lelo 52'; Oliveira 72' (o.g.) | Stadium: Estádio Municipal de Braga; Attendance: 10,894; Referee: Tiago Martins |

| 11 May 2024 33 | Vitória de Guimarães | 2–3 | Braga | Guimarães |
| 20:30 WEST (UTC+01:00) | Gaspar 10'; Mangas 80' | Report | Bruma 25'; Horta 75'; Lopes 90+3' | Stadium: Estádio D. Afonso Henriques; Attendance: 25,224; Referee: Fábio Veríssimo |

| 18 May 2024 34 | Braga | 0–1 | Porto | Braga |
| 20:30 WEST (UTC+01:00) | | Report | Galeno 84' | Stadium: Estádio Municipal de Braga; Attendance: 23,284; Referee: Nuno Almeida |

=== Taça de Portugal ===
| 19 October 2023 Third round | Rebordosa | 0–2 | Braga | Rebordosa |
| 20:00 WEST (UTC+01:00) | | Report | Rony 10'; Djaló 62' | Stadium: Monte de Azevido; Referee: Bruno José Costa |

| 25 November 2023 Fourth round | Portimonense | 1–4 | Braga | Portimão |
| 15:30 WEST (UTC+01:00) | Relvas 84' | Report | Djaló 13'; R. Horta 47', 49'; Rony 76' | Stadium: Estádio Municipal de Portimão; Referee: André Narciso |

| 10 January 2024 Fifth round | Benfica | 3–2 | Braga | Lisbon |
| 20:45 | Rafa Silva 42'; Cabral 44'; Aursnes 70' | | João Mário 7' (o.g.); Zalazar 48' | Stadium: Estádio da Luz |

=== Taça da Liga ===
==== Third round ====
| Pos | Team | Pld | W | D | L | GF | GA | GD | Pts | Qualification | BRA | CAS | NAC |
|---|---|---|---|---|---|---|---|---|---|---|---|---|---|
| 1 | Braga | 2 | 1 | 1 | 0 | 4 | 2 | +2 | 4 | Advance to knockout phase | — | 1–1 | — |
| 2 | Casa Pia | 2 | 1 | 1 | 0 | 3 | 2 | +1 | 4 | | — | — | 2–1 |
| 3 | Nacional | 2 | 0 | 0 | 2 | 2 | 5 | −3 | 0 | | 1–3 | — | — |

Source: Liga Portugal
Rules for classification: Tiebreakers

| 1 November 2023 1 | Braga | 1–1 | Casa Pia | Braga |
| 20:15 WEST (UTC+01:00) | Pizzi 62' | Report | Clayton 76' (pen.) | Stadium: Estádio Municipal de Braga; Attendance: 6,005; Referee: André Narciso |

| 22 December 2023 3 | Nacional | 1–3 | Braga | Funchal |
| 20:15 WEST (UTC+01:00) | Gomes 62' | Report | Moutinho 16' (pen.); Niakaté 24'; Horta 44' | Stadium: Estádio da Madeira; Attendance: 1,784; Referee: Miguel Nogueira |

==== Semi-final ====
| 23 January 2024 | Braga | 1–0 | Sporting CP | Leiria |
| 19:45 WET (UTC±00:00) | Ruiz 65' | Report | | Stadium: Estádio Dr. Magalhães Pessoa; Attendance: 18,504; Referee: Nuno Almeida |

==== Final ====
| 27 January 2024 | Braga | 1–1 (5–4 p) | Estoril | Leiria |
| 19:45 WET (UTC±00:00) | Horta 20' | Report | Cassiano 6' (pen.) | Stadium: Estádio Dr. Magalhães Pessoa; Attendance: 18,989; Referee: Fábio Veríssimo |
| | Penalties |
| | Horta (penalty scored); Moutinho (penalty scored); Ruiz (penalty scored); Pizzi (penalty scored); Al-Musrati (penalty scored) | | (penalty scored) Feltes; (penalty scored) Marqués; (penalty scored) Tavares; (penalty scored) Pina; (penalty missed) Araújo |

=== UEFA Champions League ===
==== Qualifying rounds ====
===== Third qualifying round =====
| 8 August 2023 First leg | Braga (Portugal) | 3–0 | (Serbia) TSC | Braga |
| 21:00 WEST | Bruma 17'; Pizzi 19'; Djaló 87' | Report | | Stadium: Estádio Municipal de Braga; Attendance: 22,186; Referee: Harald Lechner (Austria) |

| 15 August 2023 Second leg | TSC (Serbia) | 1–4 (1–7 agg.) | (Portugal) Braga | Bačka Topola, Serbia |
| 20:00 CEST | Rakonjac 40' | Report | Pizzi 9'; Bruma 13'; Djaló 16'; Al-Musrati 20' | Stadium: TSC Arena; Attendance: 4,200; Referee: Jakob Kehlet (Denmark) |

===== Play-off round =====
| 23 August 2023 First leg | Braga (Portugal) | 2–1 | (Greece) Panathinaikos | Braga |
| 20:00 WEST | Ruiz 51'; Djaló 73' | Report | Mancini 90+5' | Stadium: Estádio Municipal de Braga; Attendance: 23,401; Referee: Felix Zwayer (Germany) |

| 29 August 2023 Second leg | Panathinaikos (Greece) | 0–1 (1–3 agg.) | (Portugal) Braga | Athens, Greece |
| 20:00 CEST | | Report | Bruma 83' | Stadium: Leoforos Alexandras Stadium; Attendance: 61,390; Referee: Daniele Orsato (Italy) |

==== Group stage ====
The draw for the group stage was held on 31 August 2023.

| Pos | Team | Pld | W | D | L | GF | GA | GD | Pts | Qualification | RMA | NAP | BRA | UNB |
|---|---|---|---|---|---|---|---|---|---|---|---|---|---|---|
| 1 | (Spain) Real Madrid | 6 | 6 | 0 | 0 | 16 | 7 | +9 | 18 | Advance to knockout phase | — | 4–2 | 3–0 | 1–0 |
| 2 | (Italy) Napoli | 6 | 3 | 1 | 2 | 10 | 9 | +1 | 10 | Advance to knockout phase | 2–3 | — | 2–0 | 1–1 |
| 3 | (Portugal) Braga | 6 | 1 | 1 | 4 | 6 | 12 | −6 | 4 | Transfer to Europa League | 1–2 | 1–2 | — | 1–1 |
| 4 | (Germany) Union Berlin | 6 | 0 | 2 | 4 | 6 | 10 | −4 | 2 | | 2–3 | 0–1 | 2–3 | — |

Source: UEFA
Rules for classification: Group stage tiebreakers

| 20 September 2023 1 | Braga (Portugal) | 1–2 | (Italy) Napoli | Braga |
| 20:00 WEST (UTC+1) | Bruma 84' | Report | Di Lorenzo 45+1'; Niakaté 88' (o.g.) | Stadium: Estádio Municipal; Attendance: 18,422; Referee: Serdar Gözübüyük (Netherlands) |

| 3 October 2023 2 | Union Berlin (Germany) | 2–3 | (Portugal) Braga | Berlin, Germany |
| 18:45 CEST (UTC+2) | Becker 30', 37' | Report | Niakaté 41'; Bruma 51'; Castro 90+4' | Stadium: Olympiastadion; Attendance: 73,445; Referee: Srđan Jovanović (Serbia) |
Note: Union Berlin played their European home matches at the Olympiastadion, instead of their regular stadium, the Stadion An der Alten Försterei, which did not meet UEFA requirements.

| 24 October 2023 3 | Braga (Portugal) | 1–2 | (Spain) Real Madrid | Braga |
| 21:00 UTC+2 | Djaló 63' | Report | Rodrygo 16'; Bellingham 61' | Stadium: Estádio Municipal; Attendance: 29,820; Referee: Michael Oliver (England) |

| 8 November 2023 4 | Real Madrid (Spain) | 3–0 | (Portugal) Braga | Madrid, Spain |
| 21:00 UTC+1 | Brahim 27'; Vinícius 58'; Rodrygo 61' | Report | | Stadium: Santiago Bernabéu; Attendance: 68,509; Referee: Halil Umut Meler (Turkey) |

| 29 November 2023 5 | Braga (Portugal) | 1–1 | (Germany) Union Berlin | Braga |
| 20:00 WET (UTC+0) | Djaló 51' | Report | Gosens 42' | Stadium: Estádio Municipal; Attendance: 15,855; Referee: Clément Turpin (France) |

| 12 December 2023 6 | Napoli (Italy) | 2–0 | (Portugal) Braga | Naples, Italy |
| 21:00 CET (UTC+1) | Saatçı 9' (o.g.); Osimhen 33' | Report | | Stadium: Stadio Diego Armando Maradona; Attendance: 37,841; Referee: Slavko Vinčić (Slovenia) |

=== UEFA Europa League ===
==== Knockout phase ====
===== Knockout round play-offs =====
The draw for the knockout round play-offs was held on 18 December 2023.

| 15 February 2024 First leg | Braga (Portugal) | 2–4 | (Azerbaijan) Qarabağ | Braga, Portugal |
| 20:00 WET (UTC+1) | Banza 44'; Ruiz (yellow card) 45+2'; Moutinho 90+1' (pen.) | Report | Janković 21' (pen.); Silva (yellow card) 30'; Zoubir 54', 69'; Juninho 65'; Romão (yellow card) 76' | Stadium: Estádio Municipal de Braga; Attendance: 12,122; Referee: Morten Krogh (Denmark) |

| 22 February 2024 Second leg | Qarabağ (Azerbaijan) | 2–3 (a.e.t.) (6–5 agg.) | (Portugal) Braga | Baku, Azerbaijan |
| 21:45 AZT (UTC+4) | Júlio Romão (yellow card) 35'; Cafarguliyev (yellow card) 53' (yellow-red card) 57'; Bayramov (yellow card) 85'; Vešović (yellow card) 90+1'; Silva 102'; Mustafazada (yellow card) 111'; Axundzadə 120+2' | Report | Gómez (yellow card) 55'; Fernandes 70'; Djaló 83', (yellow card) 100'; Oliveira (yellow card) 86'; Ndour (yellow card) 110'; Banza 115' (pen.) (yellow card) 120+3' | Stadium: Tofiq Bahramov Republican Stadium; Referee: Georgi Kabakov (Bulgaria) |

== Statistics ==
=== Squad appearances and goals ===
As of 12 December 2023

| No. | Pos | Nat | Player | Total | | Primeira Liga | | Taça de Portugal | | Taça da Liga | | UEFA Champions League | |
| No. | Pos | Nat | Player | Apps | Goals | Apps | Goals | Apps | Goals | Apps | Goals | Apps | Goals |
Goalkeepers
| 1 | GK | (Brazil) BRA | Matheus | 23 | 0 | 13 | 0 | 0 | 0 | 0 | 0 | 10 | 0 |
| 12 | GK | (Portugal) POR | Tiago Sá | 1 | 0 | 0 | 0 | 1 | 0 | 0 | 0 | 0 | 0 |
| 31 | GK | (Brazil) BRA | Bernardo | 0 | 0 | 0 | 0 | 0 | 0 | 0 | 0 | 0 | 0 |
| 91 | GK | (Czech Republic) CZE | Lukáš Horníček | 2 | 0 | 0 | 0 | 1 | 0 | 1 | 0 | 0 | 0 |
Defenders
| 2 | DF | (Spain) ESP | Víctor Gómez | 19 | 0 | 10 | 0 | 1 | 0 | 0 | 0 | 8 | 0 |
| 4 | DF | (France) FRA | Sikou Niakaté | 16 | 1 | 6 | 0 | 1 | 0 | 0 | 0 | 9 | 1 |
| 5 | DF | (Turkey) TUR | Serdar Saatçı | 13 | 0 | 7 | 0 | 0 | 0 | 1 | 0 | 3+2 | 0 |
| 6 | DF | (Portugal) POR | José Fonte | 20 | 0 | 8+1 | 0 | 2 | 0 | 1 | 0 | 8 | 0 |
| 15 | DF | (Portugal) POR | Paulo Oliveira | 8 | 0 | 5 | 0 | 1 | 0 | 0+1 | 0 | 0+1 | 0 |
| 17 | DF | (Sweden) SWE | Joe Mendes | 13 | 0 | 3+2 | 0 | 0 | 0 | 1 | 0 | 2+5 | 0 |
| 19 | DF | (Spain) ESP | Adrián Marín | 15 | 0 | 3+4 | 0 | 2 | 0 | 1 | 0 | 3+2 | 0 |
| 26 | DF | (Colombia) COL | Cristian Borja | 18 | 0 | 10+1 | 0 | 0 | 0 | 0 | 0 | 7 | 0 |
| 47 | DF | (Portugal) POR | Diogo Fonseca | 2 | 0 | 0 | 0 | 0+1 | 0 | 0 | 0 | 0+1 | 0 |
Midfielders
| 8 | MF | (Libya) LBY | Al-Musrati | 17 | 4 | 8+1 | 3 | 0 | 0 | 0 | 0 | 6+2 | 1 |
| 10 | MF | (Portugal) POR | André Horta | 19 | 2 | 4+6 | 2 | 1+1 | 0 | 1 | 0 | 1+5 | 0 |
| 16 | MF | (Uruguay) URU | Rodrigo Zalazar | 22 | 0 | 7+4 | 0 | 1 | 0 | 0+1 | 0 | 5+4 | 0 |
| 18 | MF | (Brazil) BRA | Vitor Carvalho | 21 | 0 | 6+4 | 0 | 1+1 | 0 | 0 | 0 | 8+1 | 0 |
| 22 | MF | (Portugal) POR | Pizzi | 21 | 4 | 6+6 | 1 | 1+1 | 0 | 1 | 1 | 4+2 | 2 |
| 28 | MF | (Portugal) POR | João Moutinho | 18 | 0 | 3+7 | 0 | 2 | 0 | 1 | 0 | 3+2 | 0 |
| 88 | MF | (Portugal) POR | André Castro | 6 | 1 | 0+2 | 0 | 1+1 | 0 | 0 | 0 | 0+2 | 1 |
| 90 | MF | (Senegal) SEN | Djibril Soumaré | 2 | 0 | 0 | 0 | 0+1 | 0 | 0 | 0 | 0+1 | 0 |
Forwards
| 7 | FW | (Portugal) POR | Bruma | 21 | 7 | 8+3 | 2 | 0 | 0 | 0+1 | 0 | 8+1 | 5 |
| 9 | FW | (Spain) ESP | Abel Ruiz | 22 | 2 | 4+6 | 1 | 2 | 0 | 1 | 0 | 4+5 | 1 |
| 11 | FW | (Portugal) POR | Roger Fernandes | 7 | 0 | 0+3 | 0 | 1+1 | 0 | 0 | 0 | 0+2 | 0 |
| 14 | FW | (Spain) ESP | Álvaro Djaló | 25 | 12 | 10+3 | 5 | 1+1 | 2 | 1 | 0 | 7+2 | 5 |
| 20 | FW | (Portugal) POR | Rony Lopes | 14 | 3 | 1+7 | 1 | 1+1 | 2 | 0+1 | 0 | 0+3 | 0 |
| 21 | FW | (Portugal) POR | Ricardo Horta | 24 | 9 | 11 | 7 | 1+1 | 2 | 1 | 0 | 10 | 0 |
| 23 | FW | (Democratic Republic of the Congo) COD | Simon Banza | 23 | 13 | 10+3 | 13 | 0 | 0 | 0+1 | 0 | 4+5 | 0 |
Players who have made an appearance this season but have left the club
