= Robinho (footballer, born 1997) =

Portuguese footballer

Personal information
- Full name: Ricardo Alexandre Ribeiro Vieira
- Date of birth: 31 July 1997 (age 29)
- Place of birth: Lisbon, Portugal
- Height: 1.71 m (5 ft 7 1/2 in)
- Positions: Right-back; attacking midfielder

Team information
- Current team: Académico Viseu
- Number: 75

Youth career
- 2006–2008: Linda-a-Velha
- 2008–2011: Sporting CP
- 2011–2015: Linda-a-Velha
- 2015–2016: Académica

Senior career*
Years	Team	Apps	(Gls)
2016–2017	Linda-a-Velha	5	(0)
2017–2018	Sacavenense	28	(4)
2018–2021	B-SAD	17	(0)
2021	→ Penafiel (loan)	19	(2)
2021–2025	Penafiel	98	(10)
2025–	Académico Viseu	41	(0)
- * Club domestic league appearances and goals as of 22:35, 25 October 2026 (UTC)

Ricardo Alexandre Ribeiro Vieira (born 31 July 1997), known as Robinho, is a Portuguese professional footballer who plays as a right-back or an attacking midfielder for Primeira Liga club Académico de Viseu.

== Club career ==
=== B-SAD ===
Robinho was born in Lisbon. He started his senior career in amateur football, first with Sporting Clube Linda-a-Velha then SG Sacavenense.

In the summer of 2018, Robinho moved to the Primeira Liga after signing with B-SAD. In his first season, he played only with the under-23 team.

Robinho's debut in the Portuguese top division took place on 15 September 2019, when he came on as a late substitute in a 3–1 away win against C.S. Marítimo. He finished the campaign with 15 appearances and one goal in all competitions, being sent off in the 7–1 league loss at S.C. Braga for dissent.

=== Penafiel ===
On 12 January 2021, Robinho was loaned to Liga Portugal 2 club F.C. Penafiel until 30 June. Shortly before that deadline, he agreed to a permanent two-year contract.

On 22 October 2023, Robinho scored twice (once from a penalty kick) in a 3–0 home victory over amateurs Santa Maria F.C. in the third round of the Taça de Portugal.

=== Later career ===
Robinho remained in the second division for the 2025–26 campaign, joining Académico de Viseu F.C. on a two-year deal; shortly before, he had his contract at Israeli club Hapoel Haifa F.C. cancelled due to the country's political situation.

During his spell, Robinho was converted to right-back by head coach Sérgio Fonseca, remaining in that position under Bruno Pinheiro with the side already in the top flight.
