= Vasco Lopes =

Footballer (born 1999)

Personal information
- Full name: Vasco Rafael Fortes Lopes
- Date of birth: 2 September 1999 (age 27)
- Place of birth: Portalegre, Portugal
- Height: 1.85 m (6 ft 1 in)
- Position: Winger

Team information
- Current team: Südtirol
- Number: 11

Youth career
- 2007–2011: Fabril Barreiro
- 2011–2014: Benfica
- 2016–2017: Metz
- 2017–2018: Sporting CP

Senior career*
Years	Team	Apps	(Gls)
2018–2019	Gafanha	18	(2)
2019	Vizela	2	(0)
2020	Mirandela	7	(1)
2020–2021	União de Santarém	26	(9)
2021–2022	Farense	32	(1)
2023	Akritas Chlorakas	23	(3)
2023–2025	AVS	48	(5)
2025–2026	Radomiak Radom	31	(0)
2026–	Südtirol	0	(0)

International career
2021–2022	Cape Verde	4	(0)
- * Club domestic league appearances and goals as of 22:20, 29 May 2026 (UTC)

Vasco Rafael Fortes Lopes (born 2 September 1999) is a professional footballer who plays as a winger for Serie B club Südtirol. Born in Portugal, he plays for the Cape Verde national team.

== International career ==
Lopes made his debut for Cape Verde national team on 26 March 2021 in an AFCON 2021 qualifier against Cameroon.

== Career statistics ==
=== International ===
Appearances and goals by national team and year
National team	Year	Apps	Goals
Cape Verde	2021	2	0
Cape Verde	2022	2	0
Total		4	0
