= Ruan Assis =

Brazilian footballer (born 2004)

Personal information
- Full name: Ruan Lucas de Assis
- Date of birth: 20 April 2004 (age 22)
- Place of birth: Curitiba, Brazil
- Height: 1.80 m (5 ft 11 in)
- Position: Forward

Team information
- Current team: AVS
- Number: 20

Youth career
- 2014–2023: Coritiba

Senior career*
Years	Team	Apps	(Gls)
2023–2026	Coritiba	16	(0)
2026	Athletic (MG)	11	(0)
2026–	AVS	2	(0)
- * Club domestic league appearances and goals as of 13 September 2026

Ruan Lucas de Assis (born 20 April 2004), known as Ruan Assis or just Ruan, is a Brazilian footballer who plays as a forward for Liga Portugal 2 club AVS.

== Club career ==
Born in Curitiba, Paraná, Ruan joined Coritiba's youth setup in 2014, aged ten. On 30 September 2021, he signed his first professional contract with the club, until August 2024.

Ruan made his first team – and Série A – debut on 27 May 2023, coming on as a late substitute for Wesley in a 1–1 away draw against Cuiabá.

== Career statistics ==
As of 28 May 2023

Club	Season	League			State League		Cup		Continental		Other		Total	
Club	Season	Division	Apps	Goals	Apps	Goals	Apps	Goals	Apps	Goals	Apps	Goals	Apps	Goals
Coritiba	2023	Série A	1	0	—		0	0	—		—		1	0
Career total			1	0	0	0	0	0	0	0	0	0	1	0
