= Tunde Akinsola =

Nigerian footballer (born 2003)

Personal information
- Full name: Babatunde Jimoh Akinsola
- Date of birth: 10 March 2003 (age 23)
- Place of birth: Lagos, Nigeria
- Height: 1.75 m (5 ft 9 in)
- Position: Winger

Team information
- Current team: Cercle Brugge
- Number: 30

Youth career
- 2016–2020: Valiant FC
- 2020–2022: Vasalund IF

Senior career*
Years	Team	Apps	(Gls)
2021–2022	Vasalund IF	1	(0)
2022–2024	Valladolid B	11	(0)
2022–2024	Valladolid	10	(0)
2024	→ AVS (loan)	15	(1)
2024–2026	AVS	66	(3)
2026–	Cercle Brugge	2	(0)

International career
2018	Nigeria U17	4	(0)
- * Club domestic league appearances and goals as of 12 September 2026

Babatunde Jimoh "Tunde" Akinsola (born 10 March 2003) is a Nigerian professional footballer who plays as a winger for Belgian Pro League club Cercle Brugge.

== Club career ==
Born in Lagos, Akinsola started his career with Nigerian side Valiant FC, a non-league side from his hometown. In 2020, he joined the youth ranks of Swedish second-tier side Vasalund IF, and made his senior debut with the club on 4 August 2021, coming on as a late substitute in a 1–0 Superettan home loss against Helsingborgs IF.

In September 2022, after returning to Valiant, Akinsola moved to La Liga side Real Valladolid on trial, and signed a permanent 18-month contract with the club on 26 January 2023; he was initially assigned to the reserves in Segunda Federación. He made his first team – and La Liga – debut on 14 May, replacing Cyle Larin late into a 3–0 home loss to Sevilla FC; by doing so, he became the second Nigerian to play for the club, after Bartholomew Ogbeche.

On 31 January 2024, Valladolid sent Akinsola on loan to Liga Portugal 2 club AVS Futebol SAD until the end of the 2023–24 season. On 15 August, he moved to the club permanently.

Following AVS's relegation, on 3 September 2026, Akinsola signed a four-year contract with Cercle Brugge in Belgium.

== International career ==
Akinsola represented Nigeria at under-17 level.
