= Miguel Samudio =

Paraguayan footballer (born 1986)

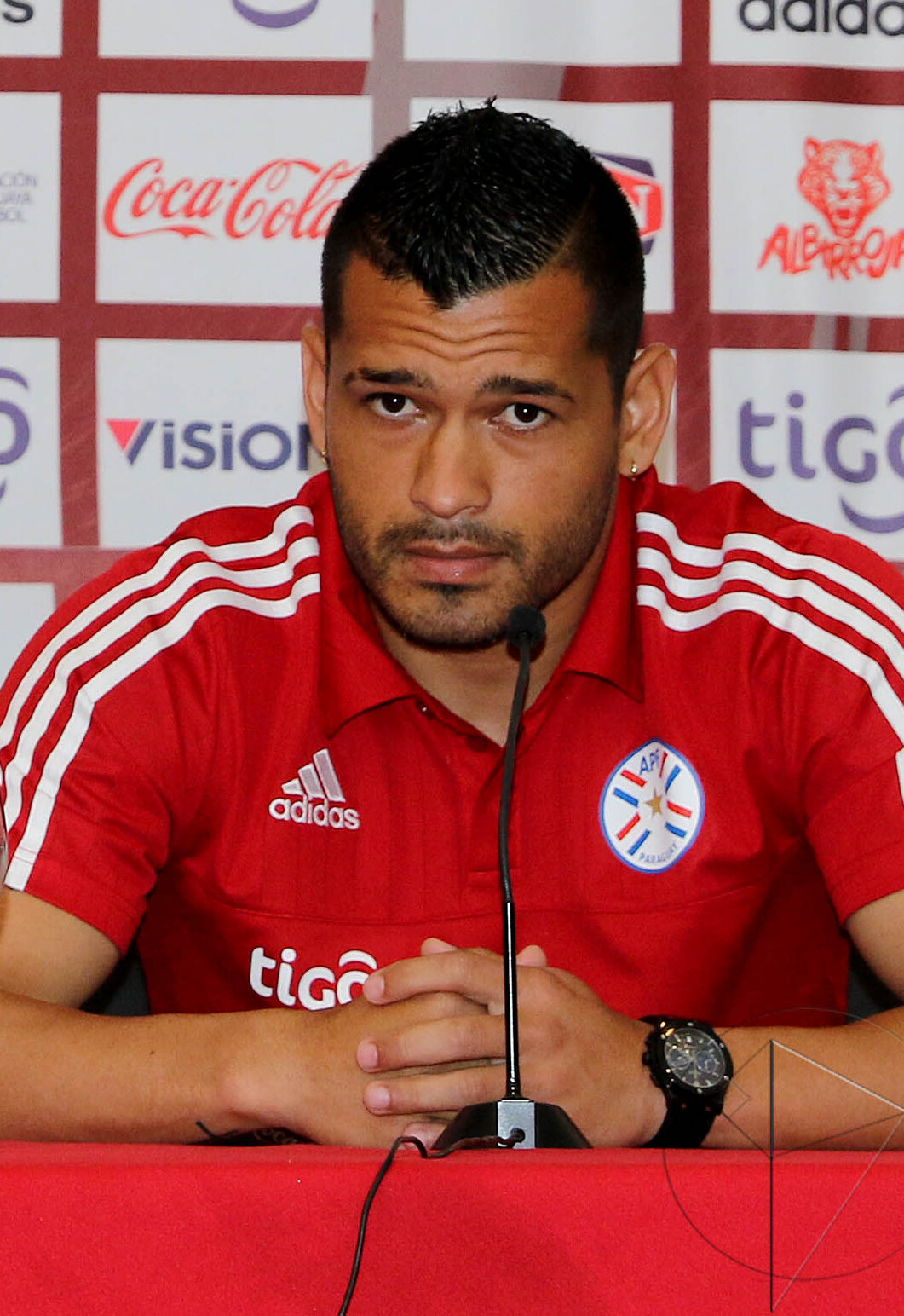
- Samudio with Paraguay in 2016

Personal information
- Full name: Miguel Ángel Ramón Samudio
- Date of birth: 24 August 1986 (age 40)
- Place of birth: Capiatá, Paraguay
- Height: 1.75 m (5 ft 9 in)
- Position: Left-back

Senior career*
Years	Team	Apps	(Gls)
2007–2008	Sol de América	27	(2)
2008–2013	Libertad	123	(8)
2014	→ Cruzeiro (loan)	9	(0)
2015–2017	América	83	(2)
2018–2019	Querétaro	32	(1)
2019–2020	Club Olimpia	14	(1)
2020	Sol de América	7	(1)
2021	Sportivo Luqueño	10	(0)
2022	Libertad	14	(0)
2023	Liverpool Montevideo	29	(2)
2024	Tacuary	10	(0)
2025	Recoleta	11	(1)
2025	San Lorenzo	12	(1)
2026	Paysandu	6	(0)

International career^{‡}
2009–2017	Paraguay	41	(1)
- * Club domestic league appearances and goals as of March 2024 ‡ National team caps and goals as of 5 October 2017

Miguel Ángel Ramón Samudio (born 24 August 1986) is a Paraguayan footballer who plays as a left-back.

== Career ==
In 2014, he signed for Cruzeiro on a one-year loan contract expiring at the end of 2014 with his playing rights set at an undisclosed fee.

=== International career ===
He made his international debut in 2009. He played in the qualifying games for the 2014 World Cup.

=== Sol de América ===
Miguel Samudio started with Sol de América in 2007, where he played 27 games and scored 2 goals. After spending two seasons with Sol de América, he moved to Club Libertad.

=== Libertad ===
In 2008 it was announced that Miguel Samudio signed with Club Libertad, where he played until December 2013.

=== Cruzeiro ===
On 13 December 2013 the Cruzeiro team announced the signing of the left back.

=== Club America ===
Subsequently, on 15 December 2014, his transfer for US$2 million and 4 years to Club América of Liga MX was confirmed, which he would join upon ending his participation with Cruzeiro.

=== Querétaro ===
On 13 December 2017, his arrival was confirmed by the Querétaro team as a definitive purchase.

=== Club Olimpia ===
In July 2019 he returned to Paraguay to join Club Olimpia.

=== Return to Sol de América ===
In 2020, after 12 years, he returned to the club where he started his career, to play the 2020 Clausura Tournament and the 2020 South American Cup.

== Personal life ==
Samudio was demoted to Liverpool Montevideo's reserves in the third division when he was caught attempting to court his teammate, Nacho Rodríguez's wife.

== Honours ==
Libertad

- Paraguayan Primera División: 2008 Clausura, 2010

Cruzeiro

- Campeonato Mineiro: 2014
- Campeonato Brasileiro Série A: 2014

América

- CONCACAF Champions League: 2014–15, 2015–16

Olimpia

- Paraguayan Primera Division: 2019 Apertura, 2019 Clausura
