= Jefferson Mena =

Colombian footballer (born 1989)

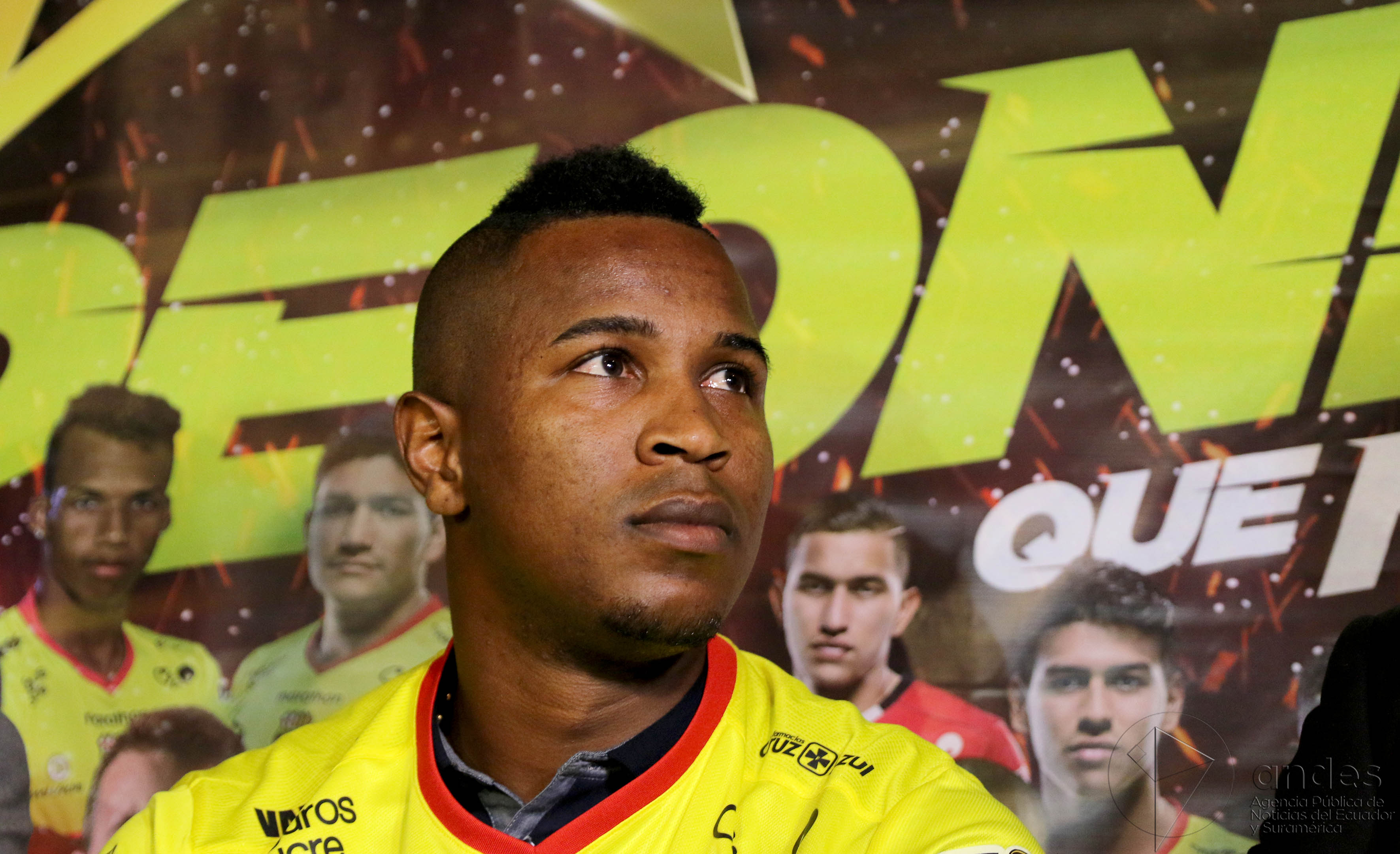

Personal information
- Full name: Jefferson Mena Palacios
- Date of birth: June 15, 1989 (age 37)
- Place of birth: Apartado, Colombia
- Height: 1.83 m (6 ft 0 in)
- Position: Centre back

Senior career*
Years	Team	Apps	(Gls)
2011–2015	Independiente Medellín	99	(3)
2015–2018	New York City FC	23	(1)
2017	→ Barcelona SC (loan)	15	(1)
2018–2019	Aldosivi	11	(0)
2019–2020	Rionegro Águilas	17	(0)
2021	La Equidad	17	(1)
2022–2025	Atlético Bucaramanga	130	(3)
2026-	Boyacá Chicó	1	(0)
- * Club domestic league appearances and goals as of 11 December 2025

Jefferson Mena Palacios (born June 15, 1989) is a Colombian footballer who currently plays as a centre back for Colombian club Atlético Bucaramanga.

== Club career ==
=== Independiente Medellín ===
Mena played for Independiente Medellín from 2011 to 2015.

=== New York City FC ===
On July 14, 2015, Mena signed for New York City FC. On July 26, Mena made his debut for the club coming on in the 15th minute for an injured Chris Wingert against Orlando City.

Mena scored his first goal for New York City on 23 September 2016, in a 4–1 win over Chicago Fire.

=== Barcelona S.C. ===
On 5 January 2017, it was announced that Mena would join Ecuadorian Serie A team Barcelona S.C. on a one-year loan, with the option to buy.

=== Aldosivi ===
In July 2018, after being released by New York City FC, Mena signed for Superliga Argentina team Aldosivi.

== Personal life ==
Mena is the brother of the professional footballers Yair and Yorleys Mena.

== Honours ==
=== Club ===
Atlético Bucaramanga

- Categoría Primera A (1): 2024-I

== Career statistics ==
=== Club ===
As of September 26, 2018

Club statistics
Club	Season	League			Cup		Total	
Club	Season	Division	Apps	Goals	Apps	Goals	Apps	Goals
Medellín	2011	Categoría Primera A	7	1	6	0	13	1
Medellín	2012	Categoría Primera A	24	0	10	0	34	0
Medellín	2013	Categoría Primera A	11	1	3	0	14	1
Medellín	2014	Categoría Primera A	25	1	8	0	33	1
Medellín	2015	Categoría Primera A	14	0	6	0	20	0
Medellín	Total		81	3	33	0	114	3
New York City FC	2015	Major League Soccer	7	0	0	0	7	0
New York City FC	2016	Major League Soccer	16	1	1	0	17	1
New York City FC	Total		23	1	1	0	24	1
Barcelona S.C.	2017	Categoría Primera A	15	1	0	0	15	1
Barcelona S.C.	Total		15	1	0	0	15	1
Aldovisi	2018–19	Superliga	4	0	0	0	4	0
Aldovisi	Total		4	0	0	0	4	0
Career total			123	5	34	0	157	5

Sporting positions
Preceded by 'Unknown'	Atlético Bucaramanga captain 2022–2026	Succeeded by Incumbent
