= Tiago André (footballer, born 1997) =

Portuguese footballer

Personal information
- Full name: Tiago André Araújo Rodrigues
- Date of birth: 18 January 1997 (age 29)
- Place of birth: Vila do Conde, Portugal
- Height: 1.82 m (6 ft 0 in)
- Position: Left-back

Team information
- Current team: União de Santarém
- Number: 5

Youth career
- 2008–2019: Rio Ave

Senior career*
Years	Team	Apps	(Gls)
2016–2020	Rio Ave	0	(0)
2020	→ Casa Pia (loan)	8	(0)
2020–2021	Leixões	15	(0)
2021–2025	Trofense	111	(4)
2025–2026	Académica	18	(0)
2026–	União de Santarém	5	(0)
- * Club domestic league appearances and goals as of 12 September 2026

Tiago André Araújo Rodrigues (born 18 January 1997) simply Tiago André, is a Portuguese professional footballer who plays for Liga 3 club União de Santarém as a left-back.

== Career ==
On 20 January 2016, Tiago André made his professional debut with Rio Ave in a 2015–16 Taça da Liga match against Belenenses.

On 10 September 2019, André joined LigaPro club Leixões.
