= Davi Schuindt =

Brazilian footballer (born 2004)

Personal information
- Full name: Davi Duarte Schuindt
- Date of birth: 26 April 2004 (age 22)
- Place of birth: Cabo Frio, Brazil
- Height: 1.83 m (6 ft 0 in)
- Position: Centre-back

Team information
- Current team: AVS
- Number: 4

Youth career
- 2013–2025: Fluminense

Senior career*
Years	Team	Apps	(Gls)
2025–2026	Fluminense	5	(0)
2026–	AVS	4	(0)
- * Club domestic league appearances and goals as of 13 September 2026

Davi Duarte Schuindt (born 26 April 2004), known as Davi Schuindt or just Davi, is a Brazilian professional footballer who plays as a centre-back for Liga Portugal 2 club AVS.

== Career ==
Born in Cabo Frio, Rio de Janeiro, Davi joined Fluminense's youth sides in 2013. On 22 February 2022, he renewed his contract with the club until 2025.

Davi made his senior debut on 12 January 2025, starting in a 0–0 Campeonato Carioca home draw against Sampaio Corrêa-RJ. On 7 April, he further extended his link until December 2026.

Davi made his Série A debut on 9 August 2025, playing the full 90 minutes in a 3–3 away draw against Bahia, as Thiago Silva and Ignácio were out injured.

== Career statistics ==
As of 25 August 2025

Club	Season	League			State league		National cup		Continental		Other		Total	
Club	Season	Division	Apps	Goals	Apps	Goals	Apps	Goals	Apps	Goals	Apps	Goals	Apps	Goals
Fluminense	2025	Série A	2	0	2	0	0	0	0	0	—		4	0
Career total			2	0	2	0	0	0	0	0	0	0	4	0
