= Álvaro Djaló =

Bissau-Guinean footballer (born 1999)

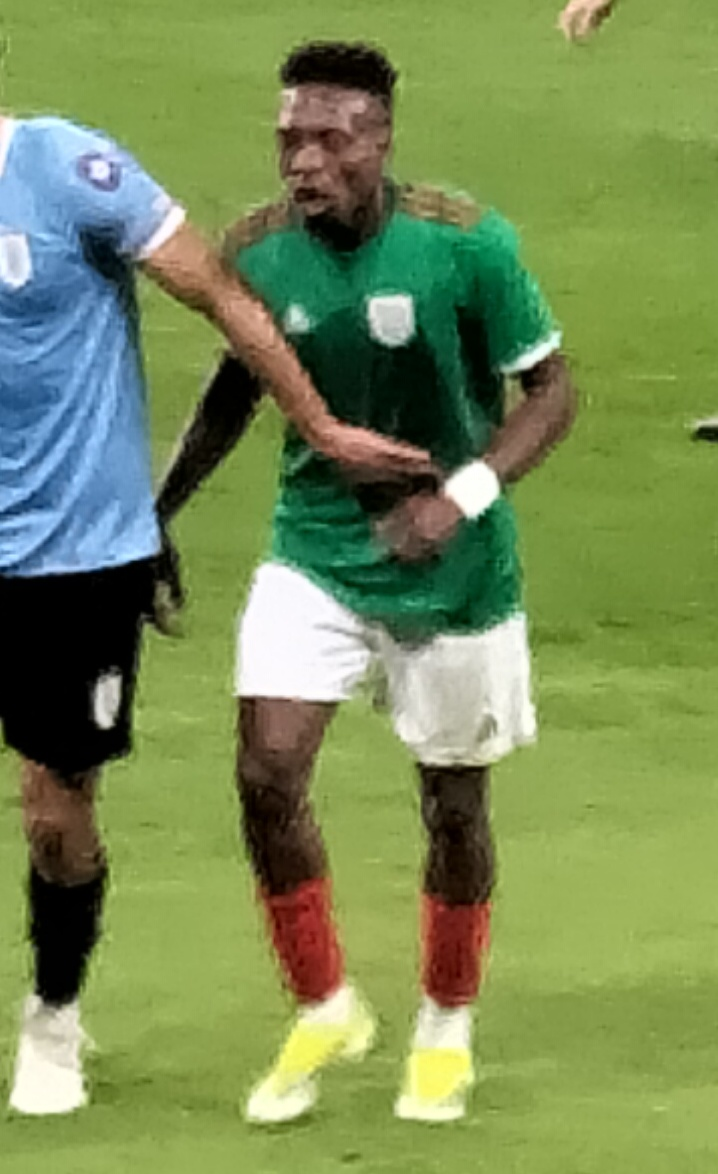
- Djalo in 2024

Personal information
- Full name: Álvaro Djaló Dias-Fernandes
- Date of birth: 16 August 1999 (age 27)
- Place of birth: Madrid, Spain
- Height: 1.75 m (5 ft 9 in)
- Positions: Forward; left winger

Team information
- Current team: Athletic Bilbao
- Number: 25

Youth career
- San Miguel
- 2015–2017: Begoña
- 2017–2020: Braga

Senior career*
Years	Team	Apps	(Gls)
2020–2022	Braga B	47	(17)
2022–2024	Braga	54	(10)
2024–	Athletic Bilbao	18	(1)
2025–2026	→ Al-Gharafa (loan)	19	(1)

International career^{‡}
2024–	Basque Country	1	(1)
2025–	Guinea-Bissau	5	(1)
- * Club domestic league appearances and goals as of 23:24, 27 August 2026 (UTC) ‡ National team caps and goals as of 19:11, 29 September 2026 (UTC)

Álvaro Djaló Dias-Fernandes (born 16 August 1999) is a professional footballer who plays as a left winger or forward for La Liga club Athletic Bilbao. Born in Spain, he plays for the Guinea-Bissau national team.

== Club career ==
Born in Madrid, Djaló spent part of his upbringing in the Bilbao area and played for local clubs including Begoña before moving to Portugal with Braga in 2017. He began his senior career with Braga's reserves in 2020, and signed his first professional contract with the club on 22 April 2022, to run until 2025. In July 2022, he started training with the senior team in preparation for the 2022–23 season.

Djaló made his professional and Primeira Liga debut as a late substitute against Sporting CP on 7 August 2022, and assisted his side's final goal to tie the game at 3–3.

In March 2024, Braga and Athletic Bilbao agreed an initial €15 million fee with potential add-ons (one of the Basque club's biggest transfer outlays) for the transfer of 24-year-old Djaló at the end of the 2023–24 season, with the player meeting the requirements of the Athletic Bilbao signing policy due to his years spent in the region as a juvenile. He made his La Liga debut on 28 August in a 1–0 home win over Valencia, and scored his first goal on 22 September in a 3–1 home success over Celta.

On 28 July 2025, after featuring sparingly, Djaló was loaned to Qatari side Al-Gharafa for one year.

== International career ==
Born in Spain, Djaló is of Bissau-Guinean descent and holds dual Spanish and Bissau-Guinean citizenship. He was called up to the Guinea-Bissau national team for a set of 2026 FIFA World Cup qualification matches in October 2025.

== Personal life ==
His cousin Adu Ares is also a footballer.

== Career statistics ==
=== Club ===
As of match played 27 August 2026

Appearances and goals by club, season and competition
Club	Season	League			National cup (Note: Includes Taça de Portugal, Copa del Rey, Amir of Qatar Cup)		League cup (Note: Includes Taça da Liga, QSL Cup)		Continental		Other		Total	
Club	Season	Division	Apps	Goals	Apps	Goals	Apps	Goals	Apps	Goals	Apps	Goals	Apps	Goals
Braga B	2020–21	Campeonato de Portugal	28	8	—		—		—		—		28	8
Braga B	2021–22	Liga 3	19	9	—		—		—		—		19	9
Braga B	Total		47	17	—		—		—		—		47	17
Braga	2022–23	Primeira Liga	24	2	7	0	3	1	7 (Note: Five appearances and one goal in UEFA Europa League, two appearances and one goal in UEFA Europa Conference League)	2	—		41	5
Braga	2023–24	Primeira Liga	30	8	3	2	3	0	11 (Note: Nine appearances and five goals in UEFA Champions League, two appearances and one goal in UEFA Europa League)	6	—		47	16
Braga	Total		54	10	10	2	6	1	18	8	—		88	21
Athletic Bilbao	2024–25	La Liga	17	1	2	0	—		8 (Note: Appearances in UEFA Europa League)	0	1 (Note: Appearance in Supercopa de España)	0	28	1
Athletic Bilbao	2026–27	La Liga	1	0	0	0	—		—		—		1	0
Athletic Bilbao	Total		18	1	2	0	—		8	0	1	0	29	1
Al-Gharafa (loan)	2025–26	Qatar Stars League	19	1	4	0	4	1	6 (Note: Appearances in AFC Champions League Elite)	0	1 (Note: Appearance in UAE–Qatar Super Cup)	0	34	2
Career total			138	29	16	2	10	2	32	8	2	0	198	41

=== International ===
As of match played 29 September 2026

Appearances and goals by national team and year
National team	Year	Apps	Goals
Guinea-Bissau	2025	1	0
Guinea-Bissau	2026	4	1
Total		5	1

Scores and results list Guinea-Bissau's goal tally first.

List of international goals scored by Álvaro Djaló
No.	Date	Venue	Opponent	Score	Result	Competition
1	29 September 2026	24 September Stadium, Bissau, Guinea-Bissau	Nigeria	3–0	3–0	2027 Africa Cup of Nations qualification

== Honours ==
Braga

- Taça da Liga: 2023–24
- Taça de Portugal runner-up: 2022–23
