= Luís Silva (footballer, born 1992) =

Portuguese footballer (born 1992)

Personal information
- Full name: Luís Manuel da Costa Silva
- Date of birth: 29 September 1992 (age 34)
- Place of birth: Matosinhos, Portugal
- Height: 1.84 m (6 ft 0 in)
- Position: Defensive midfielder

Team information
- Current team: Académico Viseu
- Number: 7

Youth career
- 2000–2011: Leixões

Senior career*
Years	Team	Apps	(Gls)
2011–2013	Leixões	60	(7)
2013–2016	Braga	4	(0)
2014–2015	→ Gil Vicente (loan)	31	(0)
2015–2016	→ Chaves (loan)	37	(6)
2016	Nacional	0	(0)
2016–2017	Belenenses	6	(0)
2017	→ Cova Piedade (loan)	17	(0)
2017–2020	Leixões	82	(9)
2020–2021	Chaves	23	(1)
2021–2022	Varzim	23	(2)
2022–2023	Vilafranquense	31	(3)
2023–2025	AVS	38	(1)
2025–	Académico Viseu	46	(1)

International career
2012	Portugal U20	5	(0)
2013	Portugal U21	4	(0)
- * Club domestic league appearances and goals as of 14:23, 29 September 2026 (UTC)

Luís Manuel da Costa Silva (born 29 September 1992) is a Portuguese professional footballer who plays as a defensive midfielder for and captains Primeira Liga club Académico de Viseu.

He played 49 Primeira Liga games for Braga, Gil Vicente, Belenenses and AVS, but spent most of his career in the second tier, achieving over 300 appearances and 30 goals for seven clubs, mainly two spells at Leixões.

== Club career ==
Born in Matosinhos, Porto District, Silva began his career at local side Leixões S.C. in the second division, making his professional debut on 21 August 2011 as the season began with a 1–0 away win against Associação Naval 1º de Maio. He scored his first goal as the game's only on 20 November at home to Santa Maria F.C. in the fourth round of the Taça de Portugal, while all seven of his league goals came the following campaign.

On 19 March 2013, Silva agreed to join S.C. Braga upon the expiration of his contract. He appeared in just four matches, with his Primeira Liga debut coming on 16 August as a late substitute in a 2–0 opening victory at F.C. Paços de Ferreira. He played more regularly on loan at Gil Vicente F.C. also in the top flight, signing in January and July of the following year.

After scoring six times in the 2015–16 LigaPro for G.D. Chaves, Silva returned to the highest tier at C.F. Os Belenenses, where he was again rarely used and subsequently loaned down to C.D. Cova da Piedade in January 2017. He then returned to Leixões and after his first season, agreed to a new deal until 2021, which he rescinded one year early amidst a COVID-related pay dispute. A highlight of his second spell at the Estádio do Mar was scoring twice in a 4–0 win over Cova da Piedade on 10 March 2018.

Following a return to Chaves and a relegated season at Varzim SC, Silva remained in division two by signing for U.D. Vilafranquense in July 2022. A year later, he renewed for a second year, while the club's Sociedade Anónima Desportiva relocated to Vila das Aves and was renamed AVS Futebol SAD.

On 22 January 2025, Silva joined second-tier Académico de Viseu F.C. on a six-month contract.

== International career ==
Silva earned nine caps for Portugal at under-20 and under-21 level, all in friendly games. On his debut on 10 January 2012, he played the second half of a 1–1 draw with Slovakia in Leiria.
