= Nacho Rodríguez (Uruguayan footballer) =

Uruguayan footballer (born 2003)

Personal information
- Full name: Ignacio Rodríguez Elduayen
- Date of birth: 10 November 2003 (age 23)
- Place of birth: Montevideo, Uruguay
- Height: 1.89 m (6 ft 2 in)
- Position: Centre-back

Team information
- Current team: Liverpool Montevideo

Youth career
- La Picada
- Rincón de Carrasco
- 2015–2021: Liverpool Montevideo

Senior career*
Years	Team	Apps	(Gls)
2021–	Liverpool Montevideo	62	(2)
2024–2025	→ AVS (loan)	16	(0)

International career^{‡}
2021–2022	Uruguay U20	7	(0)
- * Club domestic league appearances and goals as of 15:26, 7 July 2025 (UTC) ‡ National team caps and goals as of 15:26, 7 July 2025 (UTC)

Ignacio Rodríguez Elduayen (born 10 November 2003) is a Uruguayan professional football player who plays as a centre-back for Uruguayan Primera División club Liverpool Montevideo.

== Career ==
Rodríguez joined the youth academy of the Uruguayan club Liverpool Montevideo at the age of 12 where he worked up the youth levels, and debuted with their senior team in 2021. On 26 July 2024 he joined the Portuguese Primeira Liga side AVS on a year-long loan.

== International career ==
He was called up to the Uruguays for the 2022 South American Games, but had to withdraw due to injury.

== Personal life ==
Rodríguez's teammate at Liverpool Miguel Samudio, was demoted to their third division side as Samudio was trying to court Rodríguez's wife.

== Honours ==
Liverpool Montevideo

- Uruguayan Primera División: 2023
- Supercopa Uruguaya: 2023, 2024
