= Diogo Fonseca (footballer, born 2002) =

Portuguese footballer

Personal information
- Full name: Diogo Fernandes Fonseca
- Date of birth: 10 April 2002 (age 24)
- Place of birth: Viseu, Portugal
- Height: 1.92 m (6 ft 4 in)
- Position: Centre-back

Team information
- Current team: Braga

Youth career
- 2011–2012: Académico de Viseu
- 2012–2013: CB Viseu
- 2013–2014: CF Os Repesenses
- 2014–2015: Palmeiras BC
- 2015–2021: Braga
- 2017–2018: → Palmeiras BC (loan)

Senior career*
Years	Team	Apps	(Gls)
2021–	Braga B	51	(2)
2023–	Braga	0	(0)
2024	→ Estrela Amadora (loan)	5	(0)

International career^{‡}
2021	Portugal U20	3	(0)
- * Club domestic league appearances and goals as of 14 April 2024 ‡ National team caps and goals as of 01:32, 20 October 2023 (UTC)

Diogo Fernandes Fonseca (born 10 April 2002) is a Portuguese professional footballer who plays as a centre-back for Braga.

== Career ==
Fonseca is a product of the academies of Académico de Viseu, CB Viseu, CF Os Repesenses, Palmeiras BC and Braga. On 25 March 2021 he signed his first professional contract with Braga until 2023, and was promoted to their reserves, where he eventually became captain. On 9 January 2023, he extended his contract with Braga until 2025. In March 2023, he was promoted to Braga's senior team. He made his debut with the senior Braga side in a 2–0 Taça de Portugal win over Rebordosa on 19 October 2023.

On 30 January 2024, Braga sent Fonseca on loan to fellow Primeira Liga club Estrela da Amadora until the end of the 2023–24 season.

== International career ==
Fonseca is a youth international for Portugal. He played for the Portugal U20s in 2021.

== Career statistics ==
As of match played 19 January 2024

Club	Season	League			National cup		League cup		Europe		Other		Total	
Club	Season	Division	Apps	Goals	Apps	Goals	Apps	Goals	Apps	Goals	Apps	Goals	Apps	Goals
Braga B	2021–22	Liga 3	10	0	—		—		—		—		10	0
Braga B	2022–23	Liga 3	24	1	—		—		—		2 (Note: Appearances in Liga 3 third place play-off)	0	26	1
Braga B	2023–24	Liga 3	15	1	—		—		—		—		15	1
Braga B	Total		49	2	—		—		—		2	0	51	2
Braga	2023–24	Primeira Liga	0	0	1	0	0	0	1 (Note: Appearance in UEFA Champions League)	0	—		2	0
Estrela da Amadora (loan)	2023–24	Primeira Liga	0	0	0	0	0	0	—		—		0	0
Career total			49	2	1	0	0	0	1	0	2	0	53	2
