= Yair Mena =

Uruguayan footballer (born 2003)

Personal information
- Full name: Yair Mena Palacios
- Date of birth: 28 June 2000 (age 26)
- Place of birth: Medellín, Colombia
- Height: 1.78 m (5 ft 10 in)
- Position: Winger

Team information
- Current team: Atlético Nacional

Youth career
- Atlético Nacional

Senior career*
Years	Team	Apps	(Gls)
2019–	Atlético Nacional	13	(0)
2021	→Real Cundinamarca (loan)	28	(1)
2022	→Llaneros (loan)	15	(1)
2024–2025	→AVS (loan)	17	(1)
- * Club domestic league appearances and goals as of 15:26, 7 July 2025 (UTC) ‡ National team caps and goals as of 15:26, 7 July 2025 (UTC)

Yair Mena Palacios (born 28 June 2000) is a Colombian professional football player who plays as a winger for Categoría Primera A club Atlético Nacional.

== Career ==
A youth product of the Colombian club Atlético Nacional, he debuted with them in a 1–0 Categoría Primera A win over Unión Magdalena on 24 February 2019. On 29 June 2020, he signed a contract with Atlético Nacional until 2023. He spent the 2021 and 2022 season on loan with Valledupar and Llaneros respectively. On 18 January 2024, he joined AVS on loan in the Liga Portugal 2 until the summer of 2025 with an option to buy. He returned to Atlético Nacional for the 2025 season.

== Personal life ==
Mena is the brother of the professional footballers Jefferson and Yorleys Mena.

== Honours ==
Atlético Nacional

- Copa Colombia: 2023
- Superliga Colombiana: 2023
