= Ronald (footballer, born 2001) =

Brazilian footballer

Personal information
- Full name: Ronald Pereira Martins
- Date of birth: 14 June 2001 (age 25)
- Place of birth: Corumbá, Brasil
- Height: 1.77 m (5 ft 10 in)
- Position: Winger

Team information
- Current team: Swansea City
- Number: 35

Youth career
- –2019: Corumbaense
- 2019–2020: Atlético Goianiense

Senior career*
Years	Team	Apps	(Gls)
2019	Corumbaense	11	(1)
2021	Atlético Goianiense	1	(0)
2021	→ Grêmio Anápolis (loan)	14	(2)
2021–2024	Grêmio Anápolis	0	(0)
2021	→ Atlético Goianiense (loan)	25	(0)
2022	→ Guarani (loan)	18	(1)
2022–2024	→ Estrela da Amadora (loan)	46	(6)
2024–	Swansea City	115	(11)
- * Club domestic league appearances and goals as of 19:05, 17 October 2026 (UTC)

Ronald Pereira Martins (born 14 June 2001), simply known as Ronald, is a Brazilian professional footballer who plays as a winger for EFL Championship club Swansea City.

== Club career ==
Born in Corumbá, Mato Grosso do Sul, Ronald began his career with hometown side Corumbaense. He made his first team debut at the age of 17 on 2 February 2019, coming on as a second-half substitute in a 2–0 Campeonato Sul-Mato-Grossense away win against Operário de Dourados.

Ronald scored his first senior goal on 16 February 2019, netting his team's third in a 3–1 home win against Aquidauanense. He also spent a period on a trial at Atlético Mineiro before signing for the under-20 side of Atlético Goianiense.

Ronald started to appear in the first team of Dragão in January 2021, but was loaned to Grêmio Anápolis on 24 February 2021, until the end of the Campeonato Goiano. After helping the latter side win the competition for the first time ever with two goals (one of them against his parent club) in 14 appearances, he signed a permanent deal with Grêmio Anápolis and subsequently returned to Atlético for the Série A, on loan.

Ronald made his debut in the main category of Brazilian football on 30 May 2021, starting in 1–0 away win against Corinthians.

On 20 January 2022, Grêmio Anápolis sent Ronald on loan to Série B side Guarani.

On 13 July 2022, Ronald's loan spell at Guarani was cut short and he was instead sent on a season-long loan to Liga Portugal 2 club Estrela da Amadora. At the end of the campaign, following Estrela's promotion to the Primeira Liga, Ronald's loan was extended for another season.

In January 2024, Ronald signed a three-and-a-half-year contract, with an option for a further year, with EFL Championship side Swansea City, for a fee reported to be between €1.5 million and €2 million. He was praised by head coach Luke Williams after playing for the team, whilst Ronald said that he wanted to be successful for his family in Brazil.

== Career statistics ==
As of match played 29 August 2026

Appearances and goals by club, season and competition
Club	Season	League			State league		National cup (Note: Includes Copa do Brasil, Taça de Portugal and FA Cup)		League cup (Note: Includes Taça da Liga and EFL Cup)		Other		Total	
Club	Season	Division	Apps	Goals	Apps	Goals	Apps	Goals	Apps	Goals	Apps	Goals	Apps	Goals
Corumbaense	2019	Série D	1	0	10 (Note: Appearances in Campeonato Sul-Mato-Grossense)	1	1	0	—		—		12	1
Atlético Goianiense	2020	Série A	0	0	1 (Note: Appearance(s) in Campeonato Goiano)	0	0	0	—		3 (Note: Appearances in Copa Verde)	0	4	0
Grêmio Anápolis	2021	Goiano	—		14	2	—		—		—		14	2
Atlético Goianiense (loan)	2021	Série A	25	0	—		3	1	—		—		28	1
Guarani (loan)	2022	Série B	9	0	9 (Note: Appearances in Campeonato Paulista)	1	1	0	—		—		19	1
Estrela da Amadora (loan)	2022–23	Liga Portugal 2	29	5	—		1	0	3	0	2 (Note: Appearances in Liga Portugal 2 promotion play-offs)	0	35	5
Estrela da Amadora (loan)	2023–24	Primeira Liga	17	1	—		2	0	1	0	—		20	1
Estrela da Amadora (loan)	Total		46	6	—		3	0	4	0	2	0	55	5
Swansea City	2023–24	EFL Championship	18	3	—		—		—		—		18	3
Swansea City	2024–25	EFL Championship	46	2	—		1	0	2	1	—		49	3
Swansea City	2025–26	EFL Championship	45	4	—		1	0	3	1	—		49	5
Swansea City	2026–27	EFL Championship	1	1	—		0	0	0	0	—		1	1
Swansea City	Total		110	10	—		2	0	5	2	—		117	12
Career total			191	16	34	4	10	1	9	2	5	0	249	23

== Honours ==
Atlético Goianiense

- Campeonato Goiano: 2020

Grêmio Anápolis

- Campeonato Goiano: 2021
