= Yorleys Mena =

Colombian footballer (born 1991)

Personal information
- Full name: Yorleys Mena Palacios
- Date of birth: 20 July 1991 (age 35)
- Place of birth: Apartadó, Colombia
- Height: 1.82 m (6 ft 0 in)
- Position: Forward

Team information
- Current team: Alianza Universidad
- Number: 17

Youth career
- Independiente Medellín

Senior career*
Years	Team	Apps	(Gls)
2009–2014	Independiente Medellín	57	(14)
2013	→ Real Cartagena (loan)	37	(12)
2015	Morelia	17	(1)
2016	Junior	6	(0)
2016	Independiente Medellín	4	(0)
2017	América de Cali	9	(1)
2017	Alianza Petrolera	3	(0)
2018	Deportivo Pereira	16	(12)
2018	Independiente Medellín	1	(0)
2019	Real Cartagena	19	(6)
2020–2024	César Vallejo	133	(68)
2021–2022	→ Ajman (loan)	13	(4)
2025–	Alianza Universidad	34	(14)
- * Club domestic league appearances and goals as of 30 December 2025

Yorleys Mena Palacios (born 20 July 1991) is a Colombian footballer who currently plays for Alianza Universidad.

== Club career ==
Mena made his professional debut on 1 November 2009 for Independiente Medellín in a 2–1 win over Cúcuta Deportivo, Mena started the match but was substituted by Felipe Pardo in the 28th minute. In Mena's debut season Medellín won the 2009 Torneo Finalización after defeating Atlético Huila 3–2 on aggregate in the final. After playing less than 20 games in three seasons, Mena was loaned to Real Cartagena who played in the Categoría Primera B, the second division football league in Colombia.

Mena played the 2013 season with Real Cartanega where he appeared in 37 league matches and scored 12 goals. Mena was the top scorer of the 2013 Copa Colombia, he scored 14 goals in 12 matches for Cartanega and helped his team reach the semifinals where they lost to Millonarios 6–3 on aggregate.

Mena returned to Independiente Medellín for the 2014 Categoría Primera A season where he helped the team reach the Torneo Finalización final. On 11 December 2014, Liga MX club Monarcas Morelia announced Mena would be joining the club after the Torneo Finalización final. Mena started both legs of the final but Medellín lost 3–2 on aggregate to Santa Fe.

In December 2015, Mena was transferred on loan to Ascenso MX team, Club Universidad de Guadalajara

== Personal life ==
Mena is the brother of the professional footballers Yair and Jefferson Mena.

== Honours ==
=== Club ===
Independiente Medellín

- Categoría Primera A: 2009-II

=== Individual ===
- Copa Colombia top scorer: 2013
