= Bruno Sousa =

Portuguese footballer

Personal information
- Full name: Bruno Miguel de Sousa Silva
- Date of birth: 15 May 1996 (age 30)
- Place of birth: Paredes, Portugal
- Height: 1.72 m (5 ft 8 in)
- Position: Right back

Team information
- Current team: União de Santarém
- Number: 2

Youth career
- 2005–2008: Parendes
- 2008–2015: Paços de Ferreira

Senior career*
Years	Team	Apps	(Gls)
2015–2017	Paços de Ferreira	3	(0)
2016	→ Oliveirense (loan)	6	(0)
2016–2017	→ Gondomar (loan)	24	(1)
2017–2018	Gondomar	29	(2)
2018–2019	Aves	0	(0)
2019–2020	Praiense	22	(1)
2020–2021	Casa Pia	17	(1)
2021–2023	Vilafranquense	6	(0)
2022	→ Oliveirense (loan)	15	(0)
2023–2025	Fafe	38	(1)
2025–2026	Marco 09	26	(0)
2026–	União de Santarém	5	(0)

International career^{‡}
2016	Portugal U20	1	(0)
- * Club domestic league appearances and goals as of 12 September 2026 ‡ National team caps and goals as of 26 March 2016

Bruno Miguel de Sousa Silva (born 15 May 1996), known as Bruno Sousa, is a Portuguese footballer who plays for Liga 3 club União de Santarém mainly as a right back.

== Club career ==
Born in Paredes, Sousa joined Paços de Ferreira in 2008 from local Paredes, going on to complete his formation at the former club. He made his first-team – and Primeira Liga – debut on 2 March 2015, playing the full 90 minutes and being booked in a 1–0 away win against Belenenses.

On 6 July 2021, he signed a two-year contract with Vilafranquense.
