= Mário Júnior =

Bissau-Guinean footballer

Personal information
- Full name: Mário Indami Júnior
- Date of birth: 9 April 2003 (age 23)
- Place of birth: Porto, Portugal
- Height: 1.86 m (6 ft 1 in)
- Position: Centre-back

Team information
- Current team: União de Santarém
- Number: 3

Youth career
- 2020–2021: Leixões
- 2021–2023: Braga

Senior career*
Years	Team	Apps	(Gls)
2023–2025	Braga B	18	(0)
2025	→ Oliveirense (loan)	16	(2)
2025–2026	Felgueiras	6	(0)
2026–	União de Santarém	2	(0)

International career^{‡}
2025–	Guinea-Bissau	1	(0)
- * Club domestic league appearances and goals as of 12 September 2026 ‡ National team caps and goals as of 13:23, 30 May 2025 (UTC)

Mário Indami Júnior (born 9 April 2003) is a Bissau-Guinean professional footballer who plays as a centre-back for Liga 3 club União de Santarém. Born in Portugal, he plays for the Guinea-Bissau national team.

== Club career ==
Mário Júnior is a product of the youth academy of Leixões. On 7 August 2021, he joined the youth academy of Braga on a contract until 2026. On 3 January 2025, he joined Oliveirense on loan for the second half of the 2024–25 season in the Liga Portugal 2. On 21 August 2025, he transferred to Felgueiras, with Braga retaining 40% of his transfer rights.

== International career ==
In March 2025, Mário Júnior as called up to the Guinea-Bissau national team for a set of 2026 FIFA World Cup qualification matches.
