= Talles Wander =

Brazilian footballer (born 2003)

Personal information
- Full name: Talles Wander Santos Ribeiro
- Date of birth: 24 October 2003 (age 23)
- Place of birth: Cotia, São Paulo, Brazil
- Height: 1.76 m (5 ft 9 in)
- Position: Forward

Team information
- Current team: AVS
- Number: 30

Youth career
- 2016–2023: São Paulo

Senior career*
| Years | Team | Apps | (Gls) |
| 2023 | São Paulo | 2 | (0) |
| 2024– | AVS | 13 | (1) |
| 2024–2025 | → Torreense (loan) | 9 | (1) |
| 2025–2026 | → Sanjoanense (loan) | 24 | (9) |
- * Club domestic league appearances and goals as of 13 September 2026

Talles Wander Santos Ribeiro (born 24 October 2003) is a Brazilian professional footballer who plays as a forward for Liga Portugal 2 club AVS.

== Career ==
Born in Cotia in Greater São Paulo, Wander joined the academy of São Paulo at the age of thirteen. He had signed a five-year contract with the club in 2019, but as he was under-age, this deal was not recognised by international governing body FIFA, who only allow a maximum of three-year deals for minors, meaning that for the last two seasons of his deal, he could move to any foreign club on a free transfer.

With first team striker Jonathan Calleri linked with a move away from the club in early 2023, Wander was seen as a potential successor to his role in the side, due to his impressive performances in the Copinha. Manager Rogério Ceni had previously stated that Wander would not be promoted to the first team without signing a contract, and he did so in March of the same year, penning a three-year deal.

On 22 November 2023, make his debut as professional against Fluminense alongside another youth highlight, William Gomes.

On 31 January 2024, Talles Wander signed a three-and-a-half-year contract with Liga Portugal 2 club AVS Futebol SAD.

In July 2024, Wander joined Liga Portugal 2 club Torreense on a season-long loan deal.
