= Sérgio Fonseca =

Portuguese football manager (born 1972)

Personal information
- Full name: Carlos Sérgio dos Santos Fonseca
- Date of birth: 22 July 1972 (age 54)
- Place of birth: Luanda, Portuguese Angola
- Position: Centre-back

Team information
- Current team: AFS (manager)

Youth career
- 1985–1990: Académico de Viseu

Senior career*
| Years | Team | Apps | (Gls) |
| 1990 | Académico de Viseu | 1 | (0) |
| 1990–1991 | Viseu FC | 4 | (1) |
| 1991–1999 | Académico de Viseu | | |
| 1999 | Leça | 12 | (1) |
| 2000 | Académico de Viseu | 15 | (5) |
| 2000–2001 | União Madeira | 22 | (2) |
| 2001–2004 | Académico de Viseu | | |
| 2004–2006 | Nelas | | |
| 2006–2008 | Penalva do Castelo | | |
| 2008–2009 | Académico de Viseu | 31 | (2) |
| 2009–2010 | Fornos de Algodres | | |
| 2010–2013 | Penalva do Castelo | | |
| 2013–2014 | Sampedrense | 7 | (0) |

Managerial career
- 2015–2016: Lusitano FCV
- 2017–2018: Molelos
- 2020–2021: Lusitano FCV
- 2025–2026: Académico de Viseu
- 2026–: AFS
- * Club domestic league appearances and goals

Carlos Sérgio dos Santos Fonseca (born 22 July 1972), known as Carlos Sérgio while a player, is a Portuguese football manager and former player. He is the manager of Liga Portugal 2 club AVS Futebol SAD.

His playing career as a centre-back was spent mostly at Académico de Viseu. In 2025–26, he managed the club to promotion to the Primeira Liga, but was not retained.

== Playing career ==
Born in Luanda in the final years of Portuguese Angola, Fonseca was raised in Viseu. After spending his entire youth career at Académico de Viseu, he made his senior debut at age 17 on 3 June 1990, on the last day of the season in the third tier; he came on as a substitute for the last 27 minutes of a 3–0 win at Peniche. He spent the following season across the city at Viseu FC in the league below, where he scored his first senior goal. In 1991, he returned to Académico, where he would remain until 1999.

Fonseca moved to Leça of the second tier in 1999, but returned to his previous club soon after. He also had spells at União da Madeira, Nelas and Penalva do Castelo before retiring in 2014 with Sampedrense in the Viseu Football Association district leagues. He achieved a total of 343 games and 33 goals for Académico.

== Managerial career ==
=== Early career ===
Fonseca managed in youth football with O Crastro and Lusitano FCV before taking over the senior team of the latter in the then third-tier Campeonato de Portugal in 2015–16, where he won nine out of 20 games. He passed through youth and lower-league teams before being re-appointed at Lusitano FCV in 2022–23, leading them to fourth in the Viseu district league.

=== Académico de Viseu ===
Fonseca was named manager of Académico's under-19 team in 2022, while in the second division. He led them to promotion in his first season, and then to 6th and 4th place in the following campaigns. In May 2025, he was promoted to the under-23 team.

On 7 October 2025, Sérgio Vieira left the first team, who were in 15th in Liga Portugal 2 with one win out of seven games, and Fonseca succeeded him as interim manager. On his debut 11 days later, he won 2–1 at home to Gil Vicente in the third round of the Taça de Portugal; his league bow on 25 October was a 1–0 win against a visiting Chaves team that was previously unbeaten. He was the league's Manager of the Month in November for winning all three games. With a goalless draw at home to Sporting CP B on the final day, the team won promotion to the Primeira Liga for the first time in 37 years. On 13 June 2026, the club announced that he would not be retained for the upcoming season.

=== AFS ===
On 22 June 2026, Fonseca signed a one-year deal with AVS Futebol SAD, again in the second tier.
