= Mário Balbúrdia =

Angolan professional footballer

Personal information
- Full name: Mário César Azevedo Alves Balbúrdia
- Date of birth: 19 August 1997 (age 29)
- Place of birth: Luanda, Angola
- Height: 1.74 m (5 ft 9 in)
- Position: Midfielder

Team information
- Current team: Petro de Luanda

Senior career*
Years	Team	Apps	(Gls)
2018–2022	Primeiro de Agosto		
2022–2023	Estrela da Amadora	25	(1)
2023–2024	Mafra	21	(3)
2024	Dinamo Batumi	12	(5)
2025–2026	Boluspor	47	(3)
2026–	Petro de Luanda	0	(0)

International career^{‡}
2018–	Angola	12	(0)
- * Club domestic league appearances and goals as of 6 May 2026 ‡ National team caps and goals as of 1 September 2023

Mário César Azevedo Alves Balbúrdia (born 19 August 1997) is an Angolan professional footballer who plays as midfielder for Petro de Luanda and the Angola national team.

== Professional career ==
Balbúrdia is a youth product of Primeiro de Agosto, and debuted with the senior team in 2018.

On 20 July 2022, Liga Portugal 2 side Estrela da Amadora announced the signing of Balbúrdia.

On 1 September 2023, following Estrela's promotion to the Primeira Liga the previous season, Balbúrdia remained in the Liga Portugal 2, signing a one-year contract with Mafra.

On 14 September 2024, Balbúrdia joined the reigning Georgian champions Dinamo Batumi. In next three weeks he took part in five league matches, scoring three times, including a winner against Kolkheti 1913. Overall, his tally of five goals was enough to finish the season as Dinamo's shared topscorer. The Erovnuli Liga named Balbúrdia in team of the last round which encompassed nine league matches.

== International career ==
Balbúrdia debuted with the Angola national team in a 1–0 2019 Africa Cup of Nations qualification win over Botswana on 9 September 2018.

On 3 December 2025, Balbúrdia was called up to the Angola squad for the 2025 Africa Cup of Nations.
