= Fábio Fonseca =

Portuguese footballer

Personal information
- Full name: Fábio Pinheiro Fonseca
- Date of birth: 28 January 1997 (age 29)
- Place of birth: Póvoa de Varzim, Portugal
- Height: 1.95 m (6 ft 5 in)
- Position: Midfielder

Team information
- Current team: Salamanca UDS
- Number: 20

Youth career
- 2006–2016: Varzim

Senior career*
Years	Team	Apps	(Gls)
2016–2020	Varzim B	29	(0)
2017–2020	Varzim	8	(0)
2018–2019	→ Braga B (loan)	3	(0)
2019–2020	→ AD Oliveirense (loan)	20	(1)
2020–2021	Berço	14	(0)
2021–2022	FC Ordino	23	(0)
2022	Santa Coloma	0	(0)
2022–	Salamanca UDS	26	(0)
- * Club domestic league appearances and goals as of 21:01, 3 June 2023 (UTC)

Fábio Pinheiro Fonseca (born 28 January 1997) is a Portuguese footballer who plays for Salamanca UDS as a midfielder.

== Career ==
On 4 January 2017, Fonseca made his professional debut with Varzim in a 2016–17 Taça da Liga match against Arouca.
