= André Sousa (footballer, born 1998) =

Portuguese footballer (born 1998)

Personal information
- Full name: André Martins de Sousa
- Date of birth: 26 February 1998 (age 28)
- Place of birth: Setúbal, Portugal
- Height: 1.74 m (5 ft 9 in)
- Position: Left-back

Team information
- Current team: AVS
- Number: 28

Youth career
- 2006–2011: Vitória Setúbal
- 2011–2014: Benfica
- 2014–2017: Vitória Setúbal

Senior career*
Years	Team	Apps	(Gls)
2017–2021	Vitória Setúbal	64	(1)
2021–2024	Nacional	75	(0)
2024–2025	Maribor	7	(0)
2025–2026	Paços de Ferreira	23	(1)
2026–	AVS	4	(0)

International career
2016	Portugal U18	3	(0)
2016–2017	Portugal U19	5	(0)
2017–2018	Portugal U20	7	(0)
- * Club domestic league appearances and goals as of 13 September 2026

André Martins de Sousa (born 26 February 1998) is a Portuguese professional footballer who plays as a left-back for Liga Portugal 2 club AVS.

== Club career ==
On 10 September 2017, Sousa made his professional debut with Vitória Setúbal in a 2017–18 Primeira Liga match against Sporting Braga.

On 21 July 2021, he moved to Nacional on a three-year contract.

On 6 September 2024, Sousa joined Slovenian PrvaLiga club Maribor on an initial one-year contract with the option for another year.

On 15 July 2025, Sousa returned to Portugal and signed a one-season deal with Paços de Ferreira.
