= Léo Cordeiro =

Brazilian professional footballer

Personal information
- Full name: Leonardo Cordeiro de Lima Silva
- Date of birth: 27 September 1995 (age 31)
- Place of birth: Espinosa, Brazil
- Height: 1.74 m (5 ft 9 in)
- Position: Midfielder

Team information
- Current team: Ural Yekaterinburg
- Number: 22

Senior career*
Years	Team	Apps	(Gls)
2015–2016	Rio Claro	1	(0)
2016	Água Santa	0	(0)
2016–2017	Tricordiano	3	(0)
2017–2019	Espinho	60	(5)
2019–2020	Gil Vicente	3	(0)
2020	→ Lusitânia Lourosa (loan)	5	(2)
2020–2022	Vilafranquense	56	(2)
2022–2023	Mafra	33	(3)
2023–2025	Estrela da Amadora	59	(4)
2025–	Ural Yekaterinburg	19	(1)
- * Club domestic league appearances and goals as of 16 May 2026

Leonardo Cordeiro de Lima Silva (born 27 September 1995), known as just Léo Cordeiro, is a Brazilian professional footballer who plays as a midfielder for Russian club Ural Yekaterinburg.

== Career ==
On 6 June 2019, Cordeiro signed a professional contract with Gil Vicente. Cordeiro made his professional debut with Gil Vicente in a 1–1 Primeira Liga tie with S.C. Braga on 25 August 2019.

On 2 August 2022, Cordeiro signed with Mafra.

On 7 July 2023, recently promoted to Primeira Liga side Estrela da Amadora announced the signing of Cordeiro.

On 4 August 2025, Cordeiro moved to Ural Yekaterinburg in Russian First League.

== Personal life ==
Cordeiro is the brother of the footballer Leandrinho.
