= Amir Feratovič =

Slovenian footballer (born 2002)

Personal information
- Date of birth: 8 June 2002 (age 24)
- Place of birth: Ljubljana, Slovenia
- Height: 1.89 m (6 ft 2 in)
- Position: Defender

Youth career
- 2009–2011: FC Ljubljana
- 2011–2015: MNK Ljubljana
- 2015–2018: Olimpija Ljubljana
- 2018–2020: Bravo
- 2020–2022: Roma

Senior career*
| Years | Team | Apps | (Gls) |
| 2022–2023 | Estrela Amadora | 10 | (0) |
| 2023 | → Benfica B (loan) | 8 | (0) |
| 2023 | Adana Demirspor | 0 | (0) |
| 2025 | Tabor Sežana | 11 | (1) |
| 2025–2026 | Aluminij | 17 | (1) |
| 2026 | Chrobry Głogów | 0 | (0) |

International career
| 2017–2018 | Slovenia U16 | 4 | (0) |
| 2018 | Slovenia U17 | 4 | (0) |
| 2018–2019 | Slovenia U18 | 4 | (0) |
| 2019–2020 | Slovenia U19 | 10 | (0) |
| 2022–2023 | Slovenia U21 | 7 | (0) |
- * Club domestic league appearances and goals as of 15:01, 3 November 2026 (UTC)

Amir Feratovič (born 8 June 2002) is a Slovenian professional footballer who plays as a defender.

== Club career ==
Born in Ljubljana, Feratovič played for local side Olimpija Ljubljana, before joining another Ljubljana-based team Bravo.

On 5 August 2023, he signed a three-year contract with Turkish Süper Lig club Adana Demirspor, with an option for another year.

== International career ==
Feratovič represented Slovenia at all youth international levels from under-16 to under-21.

== Career statistics ==
As of match played 2 September 2026

Appearances and goals by club, season and competition
| Club | Season | League | | | National cup (Note: Includes Slovenian Cup, Polish Cup) | | League cup (Note: Includes Taça da Liga) | | Total | |
| Club | Season | Division | Apps | Goals | Apps | Goals | Apps | Goals | Apps | Goals |
|---|---|---|---|---|---|---|---|---|---|---|
| Estrela Amadora | 2022–23 | Liga Portugal 2 | 10 | 0 | 0 | 0 | 1 | 0 | 11 | 0 |
| Benfica B (loan) | 2022–23 | Liga Portugal 2 | 8 | 0 | — | | — | | 8 | 0 |
| Adana Demirspor | 2023–24 | Süper Lig | 0 | 0 | 0 | 0 | — | | 0 | 0 |
| Tabor Sežana | 2024–25 | Slovenian Second League | 11 | 1 | 1 | 0 | — | | 12 | 1 |
| Aluminij | 2025–26 | Slovenian PrvaLiga | 17 | 1 | 3 | 0 | — | | 20 | 1 |
| Chrobry Głogów | 2026–27 | I liga | 0 | 0 | 1 | 0 | — | | 1 | 0 |
| Career total | | | 46 | 2 | 5 | 0 | 1 | 0 | 52 | 2 |

== Honours ==
Aluminij

- Slovenian Cup: 2025–26
