= Isnaba Graça =

Bissau-Guinean footballer (born 2002)

Personal information
- Full name: Isnaba Fidaiba Silva Graça
- Date of birth: 4 January 2002 (age 24)
- Place of birth: Bissau, Guinea-Bissau
- Height: 1.90 m (6 ft 3 in)
- Position: Striker

Team information
- Current team: União de Santarém
- Number: 18

Youth career
- 2018–2019: Academia Bissau
- 2019–2022: Leixões
- 2022–2024: Estrela da Amadora

Senior career*
| Years | Team | Apps | (Gls) |
| 2021–2022 | Leixões | 8 | (0) |
| 2024–2025 | Marítimo B | 8 | (4) |
| 2025–2026 | Felgueiras | 0 | (0) |
| 2025–2026 | → Lusitano de Évora (loan) | 19 | (3) |
| 2026– | União de Santarém | 5 | (0) |
- * Club domestic league appearances and goals as of 12 September 2026

Isnaba Fidaiba Silva Graça (born 4 January 2002) is a Bissau-Guinean professional footballer who plays as a striker for Liga 3 team União de Santarém.

== Career ==
Graça is a youth academy graduate of Leixões. He made his professional debut for the club on 4 December 2021 in a 1–0 league defeat against Porto B.

=== Lusit. Évora ===
In 2025, Isnaba joined Lusitano, for the 2025/26 Liga 3.

== Career statistics ==
=== Club ===
As of 9 January 2022

Appearances and goals by club, season and competition
| Club | Season | League | | | National Cup | | League Cup | | Continental | | Total | |
| Club | Season | Division | Apps | Goals | Apps | Goals | Apps | Goals | Apps | Goals | Apps | Goals |
|---|---|---|---|---|---|---|---|---|---|---|---|---|
| Leixões | 2021–22 | Liga Portugal 2 | 4 | 0 | 0 | 0 | 0 | 0 | — | | 4 | 0 |
| Lusit. Évora | 2025-26 | Liga 3 | 4 | 2 | | | | | | | 4 | 2 |
| Career total | | | 4 | 0 | 0 | 0 | 0 | 0 | 0 | 0 | 4 | 0 |
