= União de Santarém =

Portuguese football club

U.D. Santarém
- Full name: União Desportiva de Santarém
- Founded: 23 August 1969; 57 years ago
- Stadium: Campo Chã das Padeiras
- Capacity: 2,167
- President: Pedro Patrício
- Head coach: Dimas
- League: Liga 3
- 2025–26: Liga 3, First stage Série B, 4th of 10; Promotion stage, 7th of 8
- Website: uds.pt
Home colours	Away colours

União Desportiva de Santarém is a Portuguese football club based in Santarém in central Portugal. They play in the 3rd national division.

The club was founded on 23 August 1969 and plays at the 2,167 capacity Campo Chã das Padeiras stadium. The club has participated in the Portuguese Second Division in the past, but has spent most of its history in the lower levels of Portuguese football.

== Current squad ==
As of 23 September 2026

Note: Flags indicate national team as defined under FIFA eligibility rules; some limited exceptions apply. Players may hold more than one non-FIFA nationality.

No.	Pos.	Nation	Player
1	GK	POR	Ricardo Ribeiro
2	DF	POR	Bruno Sousa
3	DF	GBS	Mário Júnior
4	DF	POR	Dinis Almeida
5	DF	POR	Tiago André
6	MF	GBS	Manuel Pami
7	FW	CIV	Stéphane Diarra (on loan from Alverca)
8	MF	POR	André Sousa
9	FW	POR	Costinha (on loan from Vitória de Guimarães B)
10	MF	POR	Diogo Ressurreição
14	DF	POR	Jaime Simões
17	DF	NGR	Kelechi John
18	FW	GBS	Isnaba Graça

No.	Pos.	Nation	Player
20	DF	POR	Luís Martins
21	MF	POR	João Nóbrega
22	FW	RUS	Kirill Klimov
23	FW	COL	Aly Palacios
25	DF	POR	Rui Geadas
27	MF	MTN	Abderrahmane Soumaré (on loan from Alverca)
28	DF	POR	David Vinhas
30	FW	POR	Rodrigo Mordomo
37	MF	ANG	Maya
47	GK	POR	João Oliveira
55	DF	POR	Hélder Sá
64	FW	POR	Rafael Camacho
