= André Sousa (footballer, born 1997) =

Portuguese footballer

Personal information
- Full name: André Manuel Pinto Nogueira Sousa
- Date of birth: 16 July 1997 (age 29)
- Place of birth: Porto, Portugal
- Height: 1.75 m (5 ft 9 in)
- Position: Midfielder

Youth career
- 2006–2008: FC Porto
- 2008–2010: Salgueiros
- 2010–2014: Boavista
- 2014–2016: Paços Ferreira

Senior career*
| Years | Team | Apps | (Gls) |
| 2016–2018 | Paços Ferreira | 1 | (0) |
| 2018–2019 | Leça | 12 | (0) |
| 2019 | União da Madeira | 7 | (0) |
| 2019–2021 | Pedras Salgadas | 38 | (3) |
| 2021–2022 | Pevidém | 13 | (1) |
| 2022–2023 | Francs Borains | 20 | (1) |
- * Club domestic league appearances and goals as of 20 May 2023

André Manuel Pinto Nogueira Sousa (born 16 July 1997) is a Portuguese footballer who plays as a midfielder.

== Club career ==
On 25 October 2016, Sousa made his professional debut with Paços Ferreira in a 2016–17 Taça da Liga match against Nacional. He would feature in a total of three cup games and one league game for Paços de Ferreira.
