= Ronaldo Tavares =

Portuguese footballer (born 1997)

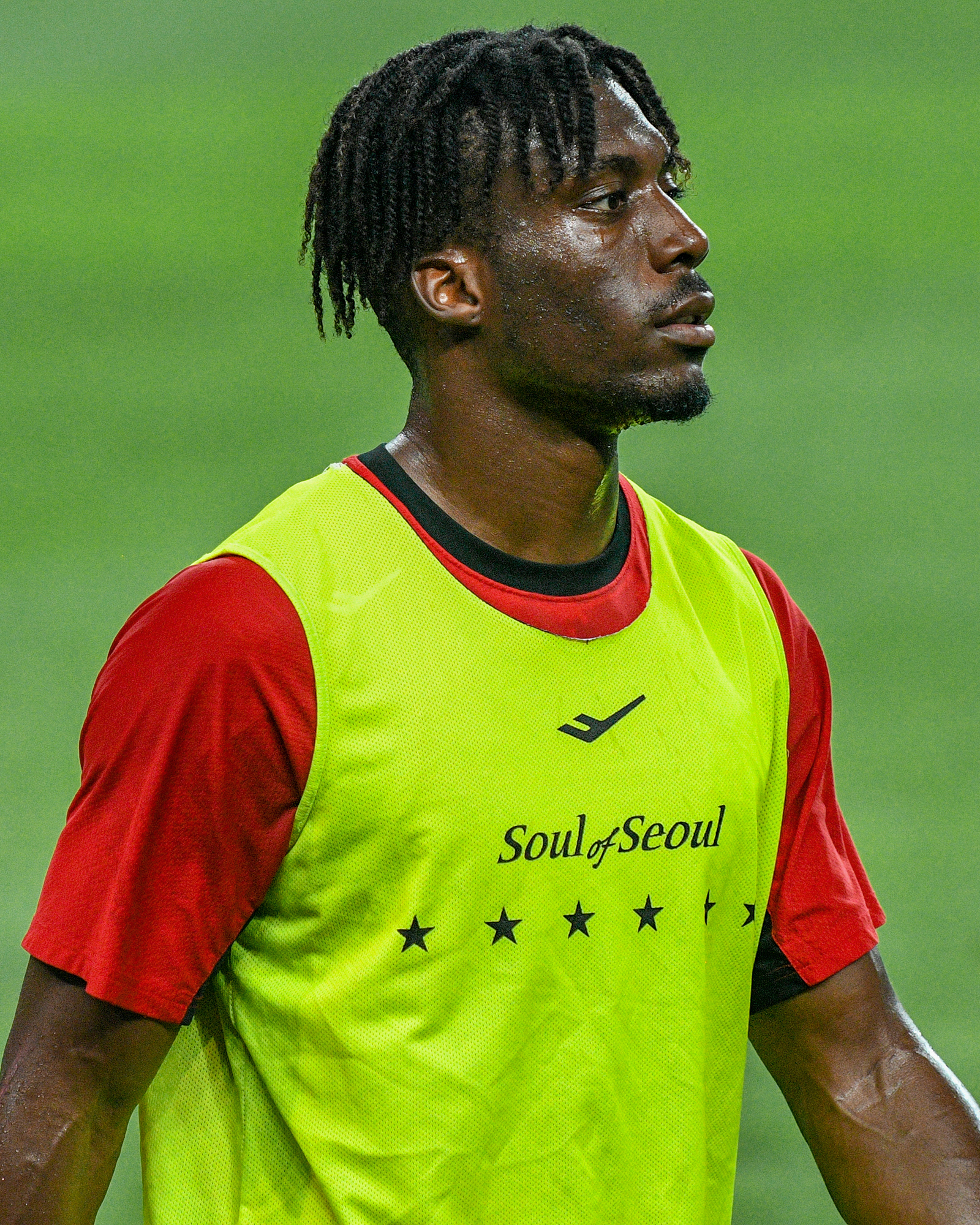
- Tavares in 2024

Personal information
- Full name: Ronaldo Rodrigues Tavares
- Date of birth: 22 July 1997 (age 29)
- Place of birth: Amora, Portugal
- Height: 1.92 m (6 ft 4 in)
- Position: Forward

Team information
- Current team: Athletic-MG
- Number: 21

Youth career
- 2011–2013: Paio Pires
- 2013–2016: Sporting CP
- 2015: → Oeiras (loan)

Senior career*
Years	Team	Apps	(Gls)
2016–2019	Sporting CP B	47	(8)
2018–2019	→ Cova Piedade (loan)	21	(2)
2019–2022	Penafiel	84	(15)
2022–2025	Estrela Amadora	48	(10)
2024	→ FC Seoul (loan)	8	(2)
2025	→ Yverdon-Sport (loan)	6	(1)
2025–	Athletic-MG	39	(18)

International career
2017	Portugal U20	1	(0)
- * Club domestic league appearances and goals as of 16:02, 16 July 2026 (UTC)

Ronaldo Rodrigues Tavares (born 22 July 1997) is a Portuguese professional footballer who plays as a forward for Campeonato Brasileiro Série B club Athletic Club (MG).

== Club career ==
Born in Amora (Seixal), Setúbal District, Tavares joined Sporting CP's academy at the age of 16, from local Paio Pires Futebol Clube. He made his professional debut with the former's reserves on 10 January 2016, coming on as a second-half substitute for Rafael Barbosa in a 2–0 away loss against C.D. Feirense in the Segunda Liga.

Tavares scored his first goal in the competition on 20 August 2016, but in a 2–4 home defeat to AD Fafe. In March 2018, he was called by first-team manager Jorge Jesus for a match against FC Viktoria Plzeň in the round of 16 of the UEFA Europa League, but eventually did not leave the bench.

On 23 July 2018, Tavares was loaned to C.D. Cova da Piedade. In the summer of 2019, he cut ties with Sporting and signed with F.C. Penafiel also of the second division.

In September 2022, Tavares joined C.F. Estrela da Amadora following an aborted transfer to Turkish club Tuzlaspor. He scored seven goals in his first season, as the team returned to the Primeira Liga after a 14-year absence; he opened the 2–1 home victory over G.D. Estoril Praia on 25 August 2023, their first since returning to that tier.

Tavares was loaned to FC Seoul on 20 June 2024. He scored his first K League 1 goal nine days later, closing the 5–1 away win against Jeonbuk Hyundai Motors.

On 28 January 2025, still owned by Estrela, Tavares joined Swiss Super League's Yverdon-Sport FC with a buying option. In June, the free agent signed a contract with Athletic Club (MG), newly promoted to the Campeonato Brasileiro Série B. Managed by his compatriot Rui Duarte, he scored four goals in his first five appearances for the latter.

== International career ==
Tavares earned one cap for Portugal at under-20 level, in the 1–1 friendly draw with South Korea on 25 January 2017.

== Career statistics ==
As of 18 January 2016

Club	Season	League		Cup		League Cup		Europe		Other		Total	
Club	Season	Apps	Goals	Apps	Goals	Apps	Goals	Apps	Goals	Apps	Goals	Apps	Goals
Sporting CP B	2015–16	2	0	0	0	0	0	0	0	0	0	2	0
Sporting CP B	Total	2	0	0	0	0	0	0	0	0	0	2	0
Career total		2	0	0	0	0	0	0	0	0	0	2	0
