= Johnstone Omurwa =

Kenyan footballer

Omurwa
Personal information
- Full name: Johnstone Omurwa Otieno
- Date of birth: 8 August 1998 (age 28)
- Height: 1.83 m (6 ft 0 in)
- Position: Centre-back

Senior career*
Years	Team	Apps	(Gls)
2017	Wazito		
2018–2019	Mathare United		
2019–2022	Wazito		
2022–2024	Estrela da Amadora	25	(0)
2024–2025	Abha	14	(0)

International career^{‡}
- Kenya U23
2019–	Kenya	11	(0)
- * Club domestic league appearances and goals as of 25 March 2025 ‡ National team caps and goals as of 22:15, 30 April 2021 (UTC)

Johnstone Omurwa Otieno (born 8 August 1998) is a Kenyan footballer who plays as a centre-back for the Kenya national football team.

== Club career ==
After finishing his secondary school education in Butere Boys' High School, Omurwa signed for Wazito in 2017, before switching to Mathare United in 2018. He made his debut for the club against Vihiga United in February 2018. In August 2019, Omurwa returned to Wazito. Omurwa was linked with a transfer to Petro Atlético in summer 2020, but the deal fell through.

== International career ==
=== Youth ===
Omurwa has played internationally for the Kenya national under-23 team, making his debut against Mauritius in a 2020 Olympics qualification match in November 2018.

=== Senior ===
He made his debut for the Kenya national football team on 8 September 2019 in a 1–1 friendly draw with Uganda. He captained the national team for a 1–0 win over South Sudan on 13 March 2021.
