= Bruno Brígido =

Brazilian footballer (born 1991)

Personal information
- Full name: Bruno Brígido de Oliveira
- Date of birth: 9 March 1991 (age 35)
- Place of birth: Criciúma, Brazil
- Height: 1.88 m (6 ft 2 in)
- Position: Goalkeeper

Team information
- Current team: América Mineiro
- Number: 91

Youth career
- Criciúma

Senior career*
| Years | Team | Apps | (Gls) |
| 2011–2015 | Criciúma | 67 | (0) |
| 2015–2018 | Coritiba | 14 | (0) |
| 2016 | → XV de Piracicaba (loan) | 15 | (0) |
| 2018 | → Guarani (loan) | 29 | (0) |
| 2018–2022 | Feirense | 61 | (0) |
| 2022–2025 | Estrela da Amadora | 76 | (0) |
| 2025–2026 | Académico de Viseu | 21 | (0) |
| 2026– | América Mineiro | 14 | (0) |
- * Club domestic league appearances and goals as of 18 November 2026

Bruno Brígido de Oliveira (born 9 March 1991), known as Bruno Brígido, is a Brazilian footballer who plays for América Mineiro as a goalkeeper.

== Club career ==
Born in Criciúma, Santa Catarina, Bruno graduated with hometown's Criciúma. During his spell at the youth setup, he was also a squash player, but chose football.

On 24 September 2011, Bruno made his professional debut, starting in a 0–2 away loss against Boa Esporte for the Série B championship. He spent the whole campaign as a third-choice, however. Bruno was elected as first-choice in 2013, and made his Série A debut on 26 May, playing the full 90 minutes in a 3–1 home win against Bahia.

On 11 March 2015, Bruno signed a four-year deal with fellow league team Coritiba. He appeared in ten league matches for Coritiba between May and July.

At the start of 2016, Bruno joined XV de Piracicaba on loan for the 2016 Campeonato Paulista. He participated in twelve matches in the aforementioned competition for Piracicaba before leaving on 12 April.

On 28 January 2025, Bruno moved to Académico de Viseu on a one-and-a-half-year deal.

== Career statistics ==
As of 7 May 2016

Statistics
| Club | Season | League | | | State league | | National cup | | Continental | | Other | | Total | |
| Club | Season | Division | Apps | Goals | Apps | Goals | Apps | Goals | Apps | Goals | Apps | Goals | Apps | Goals |
|---|---|---|---|---|---|---|---|---|---|---|---|---|---|---|
| Criciúma | 2011 | Série B | 3 | 0 | 2 | 0 | 0 | 0 | — | | — | | 5 | 0 |
| Criciúma | 2012 | Série B | 0 | 0 | 1 | 0 | 0 | 0 | — | | — | | 1 | 0 |
| Criciúma | 2013 | Série A | 11 | 0 | 22 | 0 | 6 | 0 | 0 | 0 | — | | 39 | 0 |
| Criciúma | 2014 | Série A | 19 | 0 | 0 | 0 | 1 | 0 | 1 (Note: Appearance(s) in Copa Sudamericana) | 0 | — | | 21 | 0 |
| Criciúma | 2015 | Série B | 0 | 0 | 4 | 0 | 0 | 0 | — | | — | | 4 | 0 |
| Criciúma | Total | | 33 | 0 | 29 | 0 | 7 | 0 | 1 | 0 | — | | 70 | 0 |
| Coritiba | 2015 | Série A | 10 | 0 | 0 | 0 | 0 | 0 | — | | — | | 10 | 0 |
| Coritiba | 2016 | Série A | 0 | 0 | 0 | 0 | 0 | 0 | 0 | 0 | — | | 0 | 0 |
| Coritiba | 2017 | Série A | 0 | 0 | 0 | 0 | 0 | 0 | — | | — | | 0 | 0 |
| Coritiba | Total | | 10 | 0 | 0 | 0 | 0 | 0 | 0 | 0 | — | | 10 | 0 |
| XV de Piracicaba (loan) | 2016 | Paulista | — | | 15 | 0 | — | | — | | — | | 15 | 0 |
| Career total | | | 43 | 0 | 44 | 0 | 7 | 0 | 1 | 0 | — | | 95 | 0 |

== Honours ==
Criciúma

- Campeonato Catarinense: 2013

Coritiba

- Campeonato Paranaense: 2017

Guarani

- Campeonato Paulista Série A2: 2018

Individual

- Liga Portugal 2 Goalkeeper of the Month: February 2023, April 2023
