= Jean Felipe =

Brazilian footballer

Personal information
- Full name: Jean Felipe Nogueira da Silva
- Date of birth: 18 March 1994 (age 32)
- Place of birth: Toledo, Brazil
- Height: 1.79 m (5 ft 10 1/2 in)
- Position: Right-back

Team information
- Current team: Olympiakos Nicosia
- Number: 12

Youth career
- 2014–2015: Atlético Paranaense

Senior career*
Years	Team	Apps	(Gls)
2014–2016	Atlético Paranaense	12	(0)
2015	→ Guaratinguetá (loan)	6	(0)
2015	→ Luverdense (loan)		
2016	→ Portimonense (loan)	3	(0)
2016–2022	Portimonense	0	(0)
2016–2018	→ Varzim (loan)	64	(3)
2018–2019	→ Académica (loan)	22	(0)
2019–2020	→ Chaves (loan)	14	(0)
2020–2022	→ Sporting da Covilhã (loan)	66	(2)
2022–2024	Estrela da Amadora	54	(4)
2024–2025	Leixões	27	(1)
2025	Felgueiras	5	(0)
2026–	Olympiakos Nicosia	24	(4)
- * Club domestic league appearances and goals as of 25 October 2026

Jean Felipe Nogueira da Silva, known as Jean Felipe (born 18 March 1994) is a Brazilian professional footballer who plays as a right-back for Cypriot First Division club Olympiakos Nicosia.

== Club career ==
He made his professional debut in the Segunda Liga for Portimonense on 17 April 2016 in a game against Atlético CP.

== Honours ==
Individual

- Liga Portugal 2 Team of the Season: 2022–23
