= AVS Futebol SAD =

Portuguese association football club

AVS
- Full name: AVS Futebol SAD
- Founded: 5 May 2023; 3 years ago
- Ground: Estádio do CD Aves, Vila das Aves
- Capacity: 6,230
- President: Rubens Takano Parreira
- Head coach: Sérgio Fonseca
- League: Liga Portugal 2
- 2025–26: Primeira Liga, 18th of 18 (relegated)
- Website: afsfut.pt
| Home colours | Away colours |

AVS Futebol SAD is a Portuguese professional football club currently playing in the Liga Portugal 2 (the second tier of the Portuguese football league system). They are based in the town of Vila das Aves, and play in Estádio do CD Aves.

== History ==
The club was founded on 5 May 2023 after UD Vilafranquense's SAD relocated from Vila Franca de Xira to Vila das Aves, retaining their spot in the 2023–24 Liga Portugal 2. Vilafranquense subsequently registered a new team in the AF Lisboa district championships. The club has no relation to the defunct Clube Desportivo das Aves or its phoenix club Clube Desportivo das Aves 1930, apart from the sharing of its infrastructures.

In 2024, they made their debut in the top tier of Portuguese football, after defeating Portimonense in the Liga Portugal 2 promotion play-offs.

== Players ==
=== Current squad ===
As of 15 September 2026

Note: Flags indicate national team as defined under FIFA eligibility rules; some limited exceptions apply. Players may hold more than one non-FIFA nationality.

| No. | Pos. | Nation | Player |
|---|---|---|---|
| 1 | GK | ESP | Dani Rebollo |
| 3 | DF | SRB | Lazar Rosić |
| 4 | DF | BRA | Davi Schuindt |
| 6 | DF | CPV | Carlos Ponck |
| 7 | FW | BRA | Guilherme Neiva |
| 8 | MF | POR | Jorge Meireles |
| 9 | FW | BRA | Rodrigo Pinho |
| 10 | FW | ESP | Abdoulaye Keita |
| 12 | DF | PAR | Daniel Rivas |
| 17 | FW | BFA | Régis N'do |
| 19 | FW | BRA | Rafael Lobato (on loan from Rio Ave) |
| 20 | FW | BRA | Ruan Assis |
| 22 | DF | POR | Diogo Brasido |

| No. | Pos. | Nation | Player |
|---|---|---|---|
| 25 | GK | BRA | Raul Steffens |
| 26 | DF | FRA | Bernardo Conde |
| 28 | DF | POR | André Sousa |
| 29 | FW | CAN | Deandre Kerr |
| 30 | FW | BRA | Talles Wander |
| 49 | MF | POR | Pedro Pimentel |
| 70 | MF | BRA | Roni |
| 77 | FW | BRA | Guga (on loan from Brusque) |
| 78 | MF | BRA | Andrey (on loan from Santa Clara) |
| 80 | MF | BRA | Hiago (on loan from Santa Clara) |
| 88 | MF | POR | Fernando Almeida |
| 97 | DF | BRA | Mateus Pivô (on loan from Brusque) |
| 99 | GK | BRA | Estevão |

=== Out on loan ===
Note: Flags indicate national team as defined under FIFA eligibility rules; some limited exceptions apply. Players may hold more than one non-FIFA nationality.

| No. | Pos. | Nation | Player |
|---|---|---|---|
| — | DF | BRA | Thiago Freitas (at Concórdia until 31 December 2026) |

== League and cup history ==
| Season | Div. | Pos. | Pl. | W | D | L | GS | GA | P | Cup | League Cup | Notes |
relocation of UD Vilafranquense SAD
| 2023–24 | LP2 | 3rd | 34 | 20 | 10 | 4 | 47 | 31 | 64 | R3 | R3 | Promotion via promotion play-offs winners |
