= 2026 Taça da Liga final =

- Event: 2025–26 Taça da Liga
Vitória de Guimarães	Braga
2	1
- Date: 10 January 2026
- Venue: Estádio Dr. Magalhães Pessoa, Leiria
- Referee: Hélder Malheiro
- Attendance: 19,607

The 2026 Taça da Liga final was the final match of the 2025–26 Taça da Liga, the nineteenth season of the Taça da Liga. It was played on 10 January 2026 at Estádio Dr. Magalhães Pessoa.

The competition was contested exclusively by clubs competing in the two professional divisions of Portuguese football – the top-tier Primeira Liga and the second-tier Liga Portugal 2. This season featured only eight teams in the competition.

This match marked the first time Vitória de Guimarães and Braga faced each other in a final of a major competition. It was also Vitória´s first conquer of the trophy.

== Match ==
=== Details ===
10 January 2026
20:00 WET

Vitória de Guimarães	2–1	Braga
Samu 59' (pen.); Ndoye 83'	Report	Dorgeles 17'

Estádio Dr. Magalhães Pessoa, Leiria
Attendance: 19,607
Referee: Hélder Malheiro

GK	27	(Brazil) Charles
RB	66	(Romania) Tony Strata
CB	3	(Portugal) Miguel Nóbrega
CB	26	(Uruguay) Rodrigo Abascal	(yellow card) 90+15'
LB	13	(Portugal) João Mendes	(yellow card) 15' (yellow-red card) 90+7'
CM	23	(Portugal) Diogo Sousa		(substituted off) 54'
CM	30	(Portugal) Gonçalo Nogueira
RW	18	(Cape Verde) Telmo Arcanjo		(substituted off) 54'
AM	16	(Angola) Beni Mukendi		(substituted off) 82'
LW	48	(Portugal) Noah Saviolo		(substituted off) 78'
FW	7	(Portugal) Nélson Oliveira (c)	(red card) 90+12'	(substituted off) 78'
Substitutes:
GK	25	(Colombia) Juan Diego Castillo
DF	2	(Portugal) Miguel Maga
DF	17	(Ukraine) Orest Lebedenko
DF	28	(Brazil) Thiago Balieiro
MF	6	(Serbia) Matija Mitrović	(yellow card) 88'	(substituted on) 82'
MF	20	(Portugal) Samu		(substituted on) 54'
FW	11	(Brazil) Gustavo Silva		(substituted on) 78'
FW	19	(France) Oumar Camara		(substituted on) 54'
FW	90	(Senegal) Alioune Ndoye		(substituted on) 78'
Manager:
(Portugal) Luís Pinto

GK	1	(Czech Republic) Lukáš Horníček
CB	14	(Sweden) Gustaf Lagerbielke
CB	6	(Brazil) Vitor Carvalho		(substituted off) 87'
CB	26	(Germany) Bright Arrey-Mbi
RM	2	(Spain) Víctor Gómez	(yellow card) 90+14'
CM	27	(Austria) Florian Grillitsch	(yellow card) 35'	(substituted off) 60'
CM	8	(Portugal) João Moutinho
LM	20	(Ivory Coast) Mario Dorgeles		(substituted off) 74'
RW	10	(Uruguay) Rodrigo Zalazar
CF	18	(Spain) Pau Víctor		(substituted off) 74'
LW	21	(Portugal) Ricardo Horta (c)
Substitutes:
GK	12	(Portugal) Tiago Sá
DF	5	(Portugal) Leonardo Lelo
DF	15	(Portugal) Paulo Oliveira
DF	41	(Portugal) Yanis da Rocha
MF	17	(Brazil) Gabriel Moscardo
MF	29	(France) Jean-Baptiste Gorby		(substituted on) 60'
MF	50	(Portugal) Diego Rodrigues		(substituted on) 74'
FW	39	(Spain) Fran Navarro		(substituted on) 74'
FW	77	(Spain) Gabri Martínez		(substituted on) 87'
Manager:
(Spain) Carlos Vicens

== See also ==
- 2026 Taça de Portugal final
