= 2025–26 S.C. Braga season =

S.C. Braga
2025–26 season
- President: António Salvador
- Head coach: Carlos Vicens
- Stadium: Estádio Municipal de Braga
- Primeira Liga: 4th
- Taça de Portugal: Quarter-finals
- Taça da Liga: Runners-up
- UEFA Europa League: Semi-finals
- Top goalscorer: League: Rodrigo Zalazar (16); All: Rodrigo Zalazar (23)
Home colours	Away colours	Third colours

The 2025–26 season was the 105th season in the history of Sporting Clube de Braga, and the club's 33rd consecutive season in the top flight of Portuguese football. In addition to the domestic league, the club participated in the Taça de Portugal, Taça da Liga and UEFA Europa League.

== Season summary ==
This was the first season with manager Carlos Vicens at the helm, having joined the club on 28 May 2025, signing a three-year contract.

On 23 July 2025, Braga announced that they had agreed a fee with Barcelona to sign Pau Víctor for €12 million plus €3 million in potential add-ons. The fee represented a club record transfer paid by Braga.

On 28 August 2025, Braga qualified for the league stage of the UEFA Europa League, following a 9–1 aggregate win over Lincoln Red Imps in the play-off round.

== Transfers ==
=== In ===
Date	Pos.	Player	From	Fee	Ref.
1 July 2025	DF	(Portugal) Leonardo Lelo	(Portugal) Casa Pia	Free	
1 July 2025	GK	(Morocco) Alaa Bellaarouch	(France) Strasbourg	Undisclosed	
4 July 2025	MF	(Ivory Coast) Mario Dorgeles	(Denmark) FC Nordsjælland	Undisclosed	
8 July 2025	DF	(Sweden) Gustaf Lagerbielke	(Scotland) Celtic	£2.2 million	
19 July 2025	MF	(Brazil) Gabriel Moscardo	(France) Paris Saint-Germain	Loan	
25 July 2025	FW	(Spain) Pau Víctor	(Spain) FC Barcelona	€12 million	
29 August 2025	MF	(Austria) Florian Grillitsch	(Germany) Hoffenheim	Free	

=== Out ===
Date	Pos.	Player	To	Fee	Ref.
1 July 2025	GK	(Brazil) Matheus	(Serbia) Red Star Belgrade	€1.5 million	
1 July 2025	FW	(Spain) Roberto Fernández	(Spain) Espanyol	Undisclosed	
1 July 2025	DF	(Poland) Bartłomiej Wdowik	(Poland) Jagiellonia Białystok	Loan	
10 July 2025	DF	(Sweden) Joe Mendes	(Turkey) Samsunspor	€1.2 million	
11 July 2025	DF	(Portugal) Rodrigo Macedo	(Netherlands) AZ	Undisclosed	
22 July 2025	MF	(Portugal) André Horta	(Spain) Almería	Loan	
4 August 2025	MF	(Senegal) Djibril Soumaré	(England) Sheffield United	Loan	
13 August 2025	MF	(Uruguay) Thiago Helguera	(Spain) Mirandés	Loan	
5 September 2025	FW	(Portugal) Roger Fernandes	(Saudi Arabia) Al-Ittihad	$37,500,000	

== Pre-season and friendlies ==
12 July 2025 Friendly	Panathinaikos	1–2	Braga	Kössen, Austria
16:00	Ioannidis 71'	Report	39' Horta; 56' Ouazzani	Stadium: Kaiserwinkl Arena

== Competitions ==
=== Overall record ===
Competition	First match	Last match	Starting round	Final position	Record							
Competition	First match	Last match	Starting round	Final position	Pld	W	D	L	GF	GA	GD	Win %
Primeira Liga	10 August 2025	16 May 2026	Matchday 1	4th	34	16	11	7	64	36	+28	47.06
Taça de Portugal	18 October 2025	14 January 2026	Third round	Quarter-finals	4	3	0	1	9	4	+5	75.00
Taça da Liga	October 2025	10 January 2026	Quarter-finals	Runners-up	3	2	0	1	9	3	+6	66.67
UEFA Europa League	24 July 2025	7 May 2026	Second qualifying round	Semi-finals	20	13	4	3	37	16	+21	65.00
Total					61	34	15	12	119	59	+60	55.74

Source: Soccerway

=== Primeira Liga ===
==== League table ====
Pos	Team	Pld	W	D	L	GF	GA	GD	Pts	Qualification or relegation
2	Sporting CP	34	25	7	2	89	24	+65	82	Qualification for the Champions League league phase
3	Benfica	34	23	11	0	74	25	+49	80	Qualification for the Europa League second qualifying round
4	Braga	34	16	11	7	64	36	+28	59	Qualification for the Conference League second qualifying round
5	Famalicão	34	15	11	8	42	29	+13	56	
6	Gil Vicente	34	13	11	10	47	38	+9	50	

Source: Liga Portugal
Rules for classification: 1) Points; 2) Head-to-head points; 3) Head-to-head goal difference; 4) Goal difference; 5) Matches won; 6) Goals scored; 7) Play-off.

==== Results summary ====
Overall								Home						Away					
Pld	W	D	L	GF	GA	GD	Pts	W	D	L	GF	GA	GD	W	D	L	GF	GA	GD
34	16	11	7	64	36	+28	59	8	6	3	34	18	+16	8	5	4	30	18	+12

Source: Liga Portugal

==== Results by round ====
Round	1	2	3	4	5	6	7	8	9	10	11	12	13	14	15	16	17	18	19	20	21	22	23	24	25	26	27	28	29	30	31	32	33	34
Ground	H	A	H	A	H	A	H	A	H	A	H	A	A	H	A	H	A	A	H	A	H	A	H	A	H	A	H	A	H	H	A	H	A	H
Result	W	W	D	D	L	D	L	D	W	L	W	W	W	W	L	D	D	W	W	W	W	L	W	W	D	L	W	W	D	W	L	D	D	D
Position	1	2	4	6	7	7	7	8	7	7	7	6	5	4	5	5	5	5	4	4	4	5	4	4	4	4	4	4	4	4	4	4	4	4
Points	3	6	7	8	8	9	9	10	13	13	16	19	22	25	25	26	27	30	33	36	39	39	42	45	46	46	49	52	53	56	56	57	58	59

Source: Liga Portugal
A = Away; H = Home; W = Win; D = Draw; L = Loss; P = Postponed

==== Matches ====
10 August 2025 1	Braga	3–0	Tondela	Braga
20:30 WEST (UTC+1)	Carvalho 24'; Victor 37'; Fernandes (yellow card) 70'; Horta 83' (pen.)	Report	Afonso (yellow card) 76'; Medina (yellow card) 82'	Stadium: Estádio Municipal de Braga; Attendance: 17,714; Referee: Cláudio Pereira

17 August 2025 2	Alverca	0–3	Braga	Alverca do Ribatejo
18:00 WEST (UTC+1)	Chiquinho (yellow card) 24'; Naves (yellow card) 53'	Report	Rodrigues 11'; Horta 14'; El Ouazzani 36' (pen.); Carvalho (yellow card) 48'	Stadium: Complexo Desportivo FC Alverca; Attendance: 2,776; Referee: Miguel Nogueira

24 August 2025 3	Braga	2–2	AVS	Braga
20:30 WEST (UTC+1)	Zalazar 23' (pen.); Navarro 87'; Gorby (yellow card) 90+2'; Oliveira (yellow card) 90+4'	Report	Barbosa 28', (yellow card) 37'; Duarte 34'; Spencer (yellow card) 72'; Galletto (yellow card) 85'	Stadium: Estádio Municipal de Braga; Attendance: 15,078; Referee: João António Gonçalves

31 August 2025 4	Rio Ave	2–2	Braga	Vila do Conde
20:30 WEST (UTC+1)	Clayton 14' (pen.), 24'; Špikić (yellow card) 42'; Aguilera (yellow card) 60'; Miszta (yellow card) 81'	Report	Gorby (yellow card) 13'; Fernandes 22'; Gómez (yellow card) 45'; El Ouazzani 88'	Stadium: Estádio do Rio Ave FC; Attendance: 3,250; Referee: Fábio Veríssimo

14 September 2025 5	Braga	0–1	Gil Vicente	Braga
20:30 WEST (UTC+1)	Gorby (yellow card) 18'; Niakaté (yellow card) 90+7'	Report	Pablo 45+2', (yellow card) 59'; García (yellow card) 50'; Konan (yellow card) 73'	Stadium: Estádio Municipal de Braga; Attendance: 14,118; Referee: José Armando Torres Bessa

20 September 2025 6	Vitória de Guimarães	1–1	Braga	Guimarães
--:-- WEST (UTC+1)	Mitrović 32'; João Mendes (yellow card) 48'; Silva (yellow card) 54'		Navarro 27'; Martínez (yellow card) 45+4'; Zalazar (yellow card) 72'; Lagerbielke (yellow card) 87'	Stadium: Estádio D. Afonso Henriques; Attendance: 25,114; Referee: António Nobre

28 September 2025 7	Braga	0–1	Nacional	Braga
19:00 WEST (UTC+1)		Report	Ramírez 5'; Liziero (yellow card) 12'; Santos (yellow card) 90+3'; Kaique (yellow card) 90+5'	Stadium: Estádio Municipal de Braga; Attendance: 13,502; Referee: Miguel Fonseca

5 October 2025 8	Sporting	1–1	Braga	Lisbon
18:15 WEST (UTC+01:00)	Suárez 19', (yellow card) 45'; Gonçalves (yellow card) 39'; Debast (yellow card) 80'; Hjulmand (yellow card) 90+6'	Report	Vitor Carvalho (yellow card) 75'; Navarro (yellow card) 76'; Zalazar (yellow card) 77', (goal) 90+7' (pen.); Martínez (yellow card) 90+3'; Grillitsch (yellow card) 90+11'	Stadium: Estádio José Alvalade; Attendance: 46,331; Referee: Claudio Pereira

26 October 2025 9	Braga	4–0	Casa Pia	Braga
21:30 WET (UTC+00:00)	Horta 5'; Lagerbielke 8'; Dorgeles 48'; Zalazar 57' (pen.), (yellow card) 80'	Report	Sousa (yellow card) 42'; João Goulart (yellow card) 55'; Mohamed (yellow card) 80'	Stadium: Estádio Municipal de Braga; Attendance: 11,384; Referee: Carlos Macedo

2 November 2025 10	Porto	2–1	Braga	Porto
21:30 WET (UTC+00:00)	Moura (yellow card) 19'; Rodrigo Mora 45'; Bednarek (yellow card) 66'; Sainz 79'; Fernandes (yellow card) 81'	Report	Gómez 51'; Moutinho (yellow card) 63'; Lagerbielke (yellow card) 78'; Zalazar (yellow card) 90+5'	Stadium: Estádio do Dragão; Attendance: 48,473; Referee: Fábio Veríssimo

9 November 2025 11	Braga	2–1	Moreirense	Braga
20:30 WET (UTC+00:00)	Zalazar 13' (pen.), (yellow card) 83'; Arrey-Mbi (yellow card) 49'; Horta 71'; Horníček (yellow card) 88'	Report	Pinto (yellow card) 68'; Maracás 82'; Alan (yellow card) 88'	Stadium: Estádio Municipal de Braga; Attendance: 10,290; Referee: João Pinheiro

1 December 2025 12	Arouca	0–4	Braga	Arouca
21:15 WET (UTC+0)	Fontán (yellow card) 13' (red card) 15'; Pinto (yellow card) 25'; Esgaio (yellow card) 84'	Report	Mantl 26' (o.g.); Horta 31'; Pinto 45+2' (o.g.); Lagerbielke 71'	Stadium: Estádio Municipal de Arouca; Attendance: 1,447; Referee: Miguel Nogueira

6 December 2025 13	Famalicão	1–2	Braga	Vila Nova de Famalicão
21:30 WET (UTC±0)	Sorriso (yellow card) 33'; Zabiri 41'	Report	Pinheiro 24' (o.g.); Pau Víctor (yellow card) 39', (goal) 72'; Horta (yellow card) 45+2'; Moutinho (yellow card) 48'	Stadium: Estádio Municipal 22 de Junho; Attendance: 2,561; Referee: Claudio Pereira

15 December 2025 14	Braga	1–0	Santa Clara	Braga
--:-- WET (UTC±0)	Horta 42'; Pau Víctor (yellow card) 88'	Report	Wendel (yellow card) 36'; Rocha (yellow card) 48'; Ferreira (yellow card) 74'	Stadium: Estádio Municipal de Braga; Attendance: 5,369; Referee: Bruno José Costa

19 December 2025 15	Estoril	1–0	Braga	Estoril
--:-- WET (UTC±0)	Orellana (yellow card) 41'; Lacximicant 43'; Sánchez (yellow card) 78'; Parente (yellow card) 82'; Garcia (yellow card) 90+2'; Tsoungui (yellow card) 90+4'	Report	Pau Víctor (yellow card) 62'; Grillitsch (yellow card) 90+2'	Stadium: Estádio António Coimbra da Mota; Attendance: 2,334; Referee: David Silva

28 December 2025 16	Braga	2–2	Benfica	Braga
19:00 WET (UTC±0)	Moutinho (yellow card) 30'; Zalazar 38' (pen.); Pau Víctor 45+1'; Horta (yellow card) 65' (red card) 90+3'; Moscardo (yellow card) 88'	Report	Araújo (yellow card) 15'; Otamendi 29'; Aursnes 53'; Ríos (yellow card) 74'	Stadium: Estádio Municipal de Braga; Referee: João Gonçalves

3 January 2026 17	Estrela da Amadora	3–3	Braga	Amadora
19:00 WET (UTC±00:00)	Ngom (yellow card) 11'; Kikas 16'; Cabral (yellow card) 49', (goal) 69'; Marcus 73'		Moutinho 12' (pen.); Arrey-Mbi (yellow card) 35'; Navarro 51'; Zalazar 64'	Stadium: Estádio José Gomes; Referee: Hélder Carvalho

18 January 2026 18	Tondela	0–1	Braga	Tondela
19:00 WET (UTC±00:00)		Report	Zalazar 90+2'	Stadium: Estádio João Cardoso; Attendance: 2,476; Referee: Gustavo Correia

25 January 2026 19	Braga	5–0	Alverca	Braga
21:30 WET (UTC±00:00)	Carvalho 17'; Zalazar 23'; Víctor 30'; Horta 45' (pen.); Navarro 79'	Report		Stadium: Estádio Municipal de Braga; Attendance: 8,410; Referee: Anzhony Rodrigues

2 February 2026 20	AVS	0–4	Braga	Vila das Aves
19:45 WET (UTC±00:00)		Report	Horta 7'; Zalazar 30'; Víctor 80', 83'	Stadium: Estádio do CD Aves; Attendance: 1,140; Referee: Carlos Macedo

8 February 2026 21	Braga	3–0	Rio Ave	Braga
19:00 WET (UTC±00:00)	Grillitsch 4'; Horta 73', 90+3'	Report		Stadium: Estádio Municipal de Braga; Attendance: 10,528; Referee: Miguel Nogueira

14 February 2026 22	Gil Vicente	2–1	Braga	Barcelos
21:30 WET (UTC±00:00)	Varela 65'; García 76'	Report	Horta 21'	Stadium: Estádio Cidade de Barcelos; Attendance: 7,542; Referee: Cláudio Pereira

21 February 2026 23	Braga	3–2	Vitória	Braga
21:30 WET (UTC±00:00)	Zalazar 17' (pen.), 57'; Horta 32'	Report	Barišić 19' (o.g.); Silva 54'	Stadium: Estádio Municipal de Braga; Attendance: 20,118; Referee: João Pinheiro

28 February 2026 24	Nacional	1–2	Braga	Funchal
19:00 WET (UTC±00:00)	Bóia 59'	Report	Zalazar 11', 90+6' (pen.)	Stadium: Estádio da Madeira; Attendance: 2,083; Referee: Diogo Rosa

7 March 2026 25	Braga	2–2	Sporting	Braga
19:00 WET (UTC±00:00)	Horta 34'; Oliveira (yellow card) 41'; Lagerbielke (yellow card) 61'; Moscardo (yellow card) 63'; Zalazar 90+6' (pen.)	Report	Inácio 22'; Morita (yellow card) 38'; Suárez 45+2' (pen.); Diomande (yellow card) 58'; Araújo (yellow card) 69'	Stadium: Estádio Municipal de Braga; Attendance: 22,883; Referee: Miguel Nogueira

22 March 2026 27	Braga	1–2	Porto	Braga
21:30 WET (UTC±00:00)	Zalazar 54' (pen.)	Report	Gomes 69'; Fofana 80'	Stadium: Estádio Municipal de Braga; Attendance: 25,611; Referee: António Nobre

4 April 2026 28	Moreirense	0–1	Braga	Moreira de Cónegos
19:00 WEST (UTC+1)		Report	Navarro 69'	Stadium: Parque de Jogos Comendador Joaquim de Almeida Freitas; Attendance: 2,810; Referee: Bruno José Costa

12 April 2026 29	Braga	1–0	Arouca	Braga
19:00 WEST (UTC+1)	Víctor 66'	Report		Stadium: Estádio Municipal de Braga; Attendance: 12,449; Referee: Cláudio Pereira

19 April 2026 30	Braga	2–2	Arouca	Braga
21:30 WEST (UTC+1)	Navarro 2'; Horta 90+9' (pen.)	Report	Dias 40'; Soares 65'	Stadium: Estádio Municipal de Braga; Attendance: 12,911; Referee: David Silva

23 April 2026 26	Casa Pia	0–1	Braga	Rio Maior
20:00 WEST (UTC+1)		Report	Víctor 37'	Stadium: Estádio Municipal de Rio Maior; Attendance: 1,753; Referee: Fábio Veríssimo

26 April 2026 31	Santa Clara	2–1	Braga	Ponta Delgada
19:00 AZST (UTC+0)	Paciência 71'; Silva 83'	Report	Zalazar 30'	Stadium: Estádio de São Miguel; Attendance: 1,728; Referee: Luís Godinho

3 May 2026 32	Braga	1–1	Estoril Praia	Braga
19:00 WEST (UTC+1)	Dorgeles 23'	Report	Begraoui 79'	Stadium: Estádio Municipal de Braga; Attendance: 11,858; Referee: Anzhony Rodrigues

11 May 2026 33	Benfica	v	Braga	Lisbon
21:15 WEST (UTC+1)		Report		Stadium: Estádio da Luz

16 May 2026 34	Braga	v	Estrela da Amadora	Braga
--:-- WEST (UTC+1)		Report		Stadium: Estádio Municipal de Braga

=== Taça de Portugal ===
18 October 2025 Third round	Bragança	0–1	Braga	Bragança
15:15 WEST (UTC+1)		Report	Horta 83'	Stadium: Municipal de Bragança; Referee: Sérgio Guelho

23 November 2025 Fourth round	Braga	4–2	Nacional	Braga
17:30 WET (UTC+1)				Stadium: Estádio Municipal

23 December 2025 Fifth round	Caldas	0–3	Braga	Torres Vedras
19:00 WET (UTC+1)		Report	Navarro 50'; Oliveira 53'; Dorgeles 59'	Stadium: Estádio Manuel Marques

14 January 2026 Quarter-finals	Fafe	2–1	Braga	Fafe
18:45 WET (UTC±0)	João Santos 42'; Silva 70'	Report	Dorgeles 90+5'	Stadium: Estádio Municipal de Fafe; Referee: Bruno José Costa

=== Taça da Liga ===
29 October 2025 Quarter-finals	Braga	5–0	Santa Clara	Braga
19:15 WET	Víctor 7'; Lelo 24'; Navarro 73'; Rodrigues 84'; Moscardo 88'	Report		Stadium: Estádio Municipal de Braga; Attendance: 6,574; Referee: David Rafael Silva

7 January 2026 Semi-finals	Benfica	1–3	Braga	Leiria
20:00 WET	Pavlidis 64' (pen.)	Report	Víctor 19'; Zalazar 33'; Lagerbielke 81'	Stadium: Estádio Dr. Magalhães Pessoa; Attendance: 17,469; Referee: João Pinheiro

10 January 2026 Final	Vitória de Guimarães	2–1	Braga	Leiria
20:00 WET	Samu 59' (pen.); Ndoye 83'	Report	Dorgeles 17'	Stadium: Estádio Dr. Magalhães Pessoa; Attendance: 19,607; Referee: Hélder Malheiro

=== UEFA Europa League ===
==== Second qualifying round ====
The draw for the second qualifying round was held on 18 June 2025.

24 July 2025 First leg	Levski Sofia (Bulgaria)	0–0	(Portugal) Braga	Stadion Georgi Asparuhov, Sofia
19:30 (20:30 UTC+3)		Report		Attendance: 16,040; Referee: Matteo Marchetti (Italy)

31 July 2025 Second leg	Braga (Portugal)	1–0 (a.e.t.) (1–0 agg.)	(Bulgaria) Levski Sofia	Estádio Municipal, Braga
21:00 (20:00 UTC+1)	Fran Navarro 104'	Report		Attendance: 16,771; Referee: Lothar D'hondt (Belgium)

==== Third qualifying round ====
The draw for the third qualifying round was held on 21 July 2025.

7 August 2025 First leg	CFR Cluj (Romania)	1–2	(Portugal) Braga	Dr. Constantin Rădulescu Stadium, Cluj-Napoca
18:30 (19:30 UTC+3)	Sinyan 30'	Report	Gorby 17', 50'	Attendance: 10,383; Referee: Elchin Masiyev (Azerbaijan)

14 August 2025 Second leg	Braga (Portugal)	2–0 (4–1 agg.)	(Romania) CFR Cluj	Estádio Municipal, Braga
20:30 (19:30 UTC+1)	Zalazar 19' (pen.), 45+5'	Report		Attendance: 16,168; Referee: Sascha Stegemann (Germany)

==== Play-off round ====
The draw for the play-off round was held on 4 August 2025.

21 August 2025 First leg	Lincoln Red Imps (Gibraltar)	0–4	(Portugal) Braga	Estádio Algarve, Faro/Loulé, Portugal (Note: Lincoln Red Imps played their play-off round home match at the Estádio Algarve in Faro/Loulé, Portugal, instead of their regular stadium, Victoria Stadium in Gibraltar, due to renovation works.)
21:00 (20:00 UTC+1)		Report	Gómez 34'; Zalazar 39', 80'; Víctor 90+1'	Attendance: 1,988; Referee: Morten Krogh (Denmark)

28 August 2025 Second leg	Braga (Portugal)	5–1 (9–1 agg.)	(Gibraltar) Lincoln Red Imps	Estádio Municipal, Braga
21:00 (20:00 UTC+1)	Carvalho 12'; Martínez 41', 45+1'; Vidigal 77'; Víctor 82'	Report	Gómez 89'	Referee: Erik Lambrechts (Belgium)

==== League phase ====
The draw for the league stage was held on 29 August 2025.

Pos	Team	Pld	W	D	L	GF	GA	GD	Pts	Qualification
4	(Royal Spanish Football Federation) Real Betis	8	5	2	1	13	7	+6	17 (Note: Away goals scored: Real Betis 5, Porto 3.)	Advance to round of 16 (seeded)
5	(Portuguese Football Federation) Porto	8	5	2	1	13	7	+6	17	Advance to round of 16 (seeded)
6	(Portuguese Football Federation) Braga	8	5	2	1	11	5	+6	17	Advance to round of 16 (seeded)
7	(German Football Association) SC Freiburg	8	5	2	1	10	4	+6	17	Advance to round of 16 (seeded)
8	(Italian Football Federation) Roma	8	5	1	2	13	6	+7	16	Advance to round of 16 (seeded)

Source: UEFA
Rules for classification: League phase tiebreakers
Notes:

Round	1	2	3	4	5	6	7	8
Ground	H	A	H	H	A	A	H	A
Result	W	W	W	L	D	W	W	D
Position	13	3	2	5	7	7	5	6
Points	3	6	9	9	10	13	16	17

Source: UEFA
A = Away; H = Home; W = Win; D = Draw; L = Loss

Win Draw Loss Fixtures

24 September 2025 1	Braga (Portugal)	1–0	(Netherlands) Feyenoord	Braga, Portugal
20:00 WEST	Navarro 79'; Gómez (yellow card) 90+1'	Report	Targhalline (yellow card) 69'; Valente (yellow card) 76'	Stadium: Estádio Municipal de Braga; Attendance: 12,769; Referee: Nikola Dabanović (Montenegro)

2 October 2025 2	Celtic (Scotland)	0–2	(Portugal) Braga	Glasgow, Scotland
17:45 BST	Saracchi (yellow card) 81'; Scales (yellow card) 89'	Report	Da Rocha (yellow card) 14'; Horta 20'; Martínez 85'	Stadium: Celtic Park; Attendance: 46,232; Referee: Tobias Stieler (Germany)

23 October 2025 3	Braga (Portugal)	2–0	(Serbia) Red Star Belgrade	Braga, Portugal
17:45 WEST	Navarro 22'; Dorgeles 72'	Report	Ivanić (yellow card) 45+2'	Stadium: Estádio Municipal de Braga; Attendance: 10,056; Referee: Espen Eskås (Norway)

6 November 2025 4	Braga (Portugal)	3–4	(Belgium) Genk	Braga, Portugal
20:00 WET	Zalazar 30', 71'; Navarro 86'; Martínez (yellow card) 90'; Lagerbielke (yellow card) 90+3'	Report	Heymans 45+2'; Sor 48'; Oh Hyeon-gyu 59'; Medina 72'; Kongolo (yellow card) 90+2'	Stadium: Estádio Municipal de Braga; Attendance: 11,265; Referee: Balázs Berke (Hungary)

27 November 2025 5	Rangers (Scotland)	1–1	(Portugal) Braga	Glasgow, Scotland
20:00 GMT	Tavernier 45+3' (pen.); Diomande (yellow card) 45+4' (yellow-red card) 90+5'; Barron (yellow card) 58'	Report	Navarro (yellow card) 42'; Horta (yellow card) 58'; Zalazar (red card) 61'; Martínez 69', (yellow card) 77'; Gómez (yellow card) 90+6'	Stadium: Ibrox Stadium; Attendance: 38,014; Referee: Allard Lindhout (Netherlands)

11 December 2025 6	Nice (France)	0–1	(Portugal) Braga	Nice, France
18:45 CET	Oppong (yellow card) 37'; Gouveia (yellow card) 45'; Abdul Samed (yellow card) 79'; Mendy (yellow card) 86'	Report	Víctor 28'; Grillitsch (yellow card) 34'; Navarro (yellow card) 86'	Stadium: Allianz Riviera; Attendance: 12,169; Referee: Giorgi Kruashvili (Georgia)

22 January 2026 7	Braga (Portugal)	1–0	(England) Nottingham Forest	Braga, Portugal
21:00 WET	Niakaté (yellow card) 8'; Martínez (yellow card) 50'; Yates 54' (o.g.); Sá (yellow card) 55'	Report	Gibbs-White (penalty missed) 53'; Williams (yellow card) 84'; Ndoye (yellow card) 90'; Anderson (red card) 90+4'; Sangaré (yellow card) 90+5'	Stadium: Estádio Municipal de Braga; Attendance: 12,377; Referee: Igor Pajač (Croatia)

29 January 2026 8	Go Ahead Eagles (Netherlands)	0–0	(Portugal) Braga	Deventer, Netherlands
21:00 CET	Kramer (yellow card) 54'	Report	Gómez (yellow card) 52'	Stadium: De Adelaarshorst; Attendance: 9,480; Referee: Willy Delajod (France)

==== Knockout phase ====
===== Round of 16 =====
12 March 2026 First leg	Ferencváros (Hungary)	2–0	(Portugal) Braga	Budapest, Hungary
21:00	Kanichowsky 32'; Joseph 69'	Report		Stadium: Ferencváros Stadion; Attendance: 19,859; Referee: Nick Walsh (Scotland)

18 March 2026 Second leg	Braga (Portugal)	4–0 (4–2 agg.)	(Hungary) Ferencváros	Braga, Portugal
16:30	Horta 11', 53'; Grillitsch 15'; Martínez 34'	Report		Stadium: Estádio Municipal; Attendance: 15,078; Referee: Glenn Nyberg (Sweden)

===== Quarter-finals =====
8 April 2026 First leg	Braga (Portugal)	1–1	(Spain) Real Betis	Braga, Portugal
18:45	Grillitsch 5'	Report	Hernández 61' (pen.)	Stadium: Estádio Municipal; Attendance: 20,847; Referee: Felix Zwayer (Germany)

16 April 2026 Second leg	Real Betis (Spain)	2–4 (3–5 agg.)	(Portugal) Braga	Seville, Spain
21:00	Antony 13'; Ezzalzouli 26'	Report	Víctor 38'; Carvalho 49'; Horta 53' (pen.); Gorby 74'	Stadium: La Cartuja; Attendance: 66,694; Referee: Davide Massa (Italy)

===== Semi-finals =====
30 April 2026 First leg	Braga (Portugal)	2–1	(Germany) SC Freiburg	Braga, Portugal
21:00	Tıknaz 8'; Dorgeles 90+2'	Report	Grifo 16'	Stadium: Estádio Municipal; Attendance: 27,161; Referee: Anthony Taylor (England)

7 May 2026 Second leg	SC Freiburg (Germany)	3–1 (4–3 agg.)	(Portugal) Braga	Freiburg im Breisgau, Germany
21:00	Kübler 19', 72'; Manzambi 41'	Report	Pau Víctor 79'	Stadium: Europa-Park Stadion; Attendance: 33,700; Referee: Davide Massa (Italy)

== Statistics ==
=== Goal scorers ===
As of match played 14 May 2026

Rank	No.	Pos.	Player	Primeira Liga	Taça de Portugal	Taça da Liga	Europa League	Total
1	17	MF	(Uruguay) Rodrigo Zalazar	16	0	1	6	23
2	21	MF	(Portugal) Ricardo Horta	14	3	0	4	21
3	18	FW	(Spain) Pau Víctor	9	0	2	5	16
4	39	FW	(Spain) Fran Navarro	6	1	1	4	12
5	20	MF	(Ivory Coast) Mario Dorgeles	2	2	1	2	7
6	77	FW	(Spain) Gabri Martínez	0	0	0	5	5
7	14	DF	(Sweden) Gustaf Lagerbielke	2	1	1	0	4
7	6	MF	(Brazil) Vitor Carvalho	2	0	0	2	4
7	29	MF	(France) Jean-Baptiste Gorby	1	0	0	3	4
10	2	DF	(Spain) Víctor Gómez	1	1	0	1	3
10	27	MF	(Austria) Florian Grillitsch	1	0	0	2	3
12	9	FW	(Morocco) Amine El Ouazzani	2	0	0	0	2
12	50	MF	(Portugal) Diego Rodrigues	1	0	1	0	2
14	5	DF	(Portugal) Leonardo Lelo	0	0	1	0	1
14	7	MF	(Portugal) Roger Fernandes	1	0	0	0	1
14	15	DF	(Portugal) Paulo Oliveira	0	1	0	0	1
14	17	MF	(Brazil) Gabriel Moscardo	0	0	1	0	1
14	95	FW	(Portugal) Sandro Vidigal	0	0	0	1	1
14	8	MF	(Portugal) João Moutinho	1	0	0	0	1
14	34	MF	(Turkey) Demir Tıknaz	0	0	0	1	1
Own goals				3	0	0	1	4
Totals				62	9	9	37	117

=== Clean sheets ===
As of match played 14 May 2026

Rank	No.	Pos.	Player	Primeira Liga	Taça de Portugal	Taça da Liga	Europa League	Total
1	1	GK	(Czech Republic) Lukáš Horníček	12	0	1	11	24
2	12	GK	(Portugal) Tiago Sá	0	1	0	0	1
Totals				12	1	1	11	25
