= Gonçalo Nogueira =

Portuguese footballer (born 2003)

Personal information
- Full name: Gonçalo Teixeira Nogueira
- Date of birth: 28 December 2003 (age 22)
- Place of birth: Guimarães, Portugal
- Position: Defensive midfielder

Team information
- Current team: Vitória de Guimarães
- Number: 8

Youth career
- 2011–2013: Várzea
- 2013–2022: Vitória de Guimarães

Senior career*
Years	Team	Apps	(Gls)
2022–2025	Vitória de Guimarães B	51	(2)
2022–	Vitória de Guimarães	33	(1)
2024–2025	→ Paços de Ferreira (loan)	30	(1)

International career^{‡}
2023	Portugal U20	2	(0)
2025	Portugal U21	2	(0)
- * Club domestic league appearances and goals as of 17:22, 24 September 2026 (UTC) ‡ National team caps and goals as of 17:22, 24 September 2026 (UTC)

Gonçalo Teixeira Nogueira (born 28 December 2003) is a Portuguese professional footballer who plays as a defensive midfielder for Vitória de Guimarães.

== Club career ==
Born in Guimarães, Nogueira joined the youth ranks of Vitória de Guimarães in 2013 from Várzea. In October 2022, aged 18, he signed his first professional contract to last until 2026. He made his first-team debut on 19 November in the group stage of the Taça da Liga, as a 67th-minute substitute in a goalless draw away to Vilafranquense. He scored his first goal for the team on 27 July 2023 in the UEFA Conference League second qualifying round first leg away to Celje in Slovenia, off the bench again in a 4–3 win.

On 29 July 2024, Nogueira renewed his contract to 2028, and was loaned to Paços de Ferreira in Liga Portugal 2. He played 30 games in his league season, another in the Taça de Portugal, and scored in a 3–3 draw away to Leixões in his third appearance on 24 August.

Nogueira played the full 90 minutes of the 2026 Taça da Liga final on 10 January, a 2–1 win for Vitória in the Derby do Minho against Braga. On 12 September, he scored his first Primeira Liga goal, in a 2–1 home loss to Académico de Viseu.

== International career ==
In March 2025, Nogueira played his only two matches for the Portugal under-21 team, in friendly defeats to Romania and England.

== Honours ==
- Taça da Liga: 2025–26
