= Diogo Sousa =

Diogo Sousa may refer to:

- Diogo Sousa (footballer, born 1993), Portuguese defender for Valadares Gaia
- Diogo Sousa (footballer, born 1998), Portuguese goalkeeper for Bodrum
- Diogo Sousa (footballer, born 2005), Portuguese midfielder for Strasbourg
