= Antonio Salvador =

Antonio Salvador is the name of:

- António Salvador (athlete) (born 1966), Portuguese long-distance runner
- António Salvador (businessman) (born 1970), Portuguese businessman
- Antonio Salvador (cyclist) (born 1968), Spanish cyclist
- Antonio Rodríguez Salvador (born 1960), poet, fiction writer, dramatist and essayist
