= João Carvalho =

João Carvalho may refer to:

- João Carvalho (fighter) (1988–2016), Portuguese fighter
- João Carvalho (footballer, born 1997), Portuguese footballer
- João Carvalho (footballer, born 2004), Portuguese footballer
- João Carvalho (musical engineer) (born 1969), Canadian musical engineer
- João Carvalho (runner) (born 1950), Angolan runner
