= António Salvador (businessman) =

Portuguese businessman (born 1970)

António Salvador da Costa Rodrigues (born 29 December 1970) is a Portuguese businessman. He was elected president of S.C. Braga in 2003, and has won more trophies than any other president of the club. Under his presidency, the club won the Taça de Portugal twice, the Taça da Liga three times, and the UEFA Intertoto Cup in 2008.

== Early life ==
Salvador was born in the village of Espinho near Braga and began working at age 15, while completing the final year of secondary education at night, under the guidance of his uncle. He moved to the city at the age of 20.

== S.C. Braga ==
On 24 February 2003, aged 32, Salvador was elected to the presidency of the Sociedade Anónima Desportiva (SAD) of S.C. Braga, an autonomous body running the professional football team. Pedro Machado continued as the club president until Salvador took the role a year later. Salvador's arrival at the club saw it in instability in the boardroom and on the pitch, with the club finishing in 14th and two points above relegation.

In 2003–04, under Jesualdo Ferreira, Braga finished 5th and qualified for the UEFA Cup; the club only missed out on European football once from then on, after finishing in 9th in 2013–14, their worst finish of Salvador's presidency. They won the 2008 UEFA Intertoto Cup, reached the 2011 UEFA Europa League final and qualified for the UEFA Champions League. Before Salvador, the club won the Taça de Portugal once, in 1965–66. Under his presidency, they won it twice, and the Taça da Liga three times. The club had a previous league best of 4th, and finished runners-up to Benfica in 2009–10.

In May 2021, Salvador won a seventh term as president of Braga, running unopposed and receiving 85.4% of votes, with the remainder blank. Part of his platform was to leave the Estádio Municipal de Braga and return to the Estádio 1º de Maio. In September 2026, he said that the move had been opposed by local government, and so he proposed a €50 million plan to reshape the municipal stadium, which he considered to have been designed on architectural rather than sporting merits.

Salvador marked the 20th anniversary of his presidency in February 2023. Only Jorge Nuno Pinto da Costa of FC Porto had presided longer. By April 2022, he had presided over 20 managers, and only Ferreira made it into a third season. A Bola counted in August 2024 that he had been through 27 managers, including four who had separate spells at the club; the 2019–20 season saw the club go through Ricardo Sá Pinto, Ruben Amorim, Custódio Castro and Artur Jorge, before appointing Carlos Carvalhal at the end.

In September 2024, Salvador was found guilty of falsifying documents as part of Operação Éter and received a 15-month suspended sentence. His conviction and that of his club were overturned on appeal in April 2026.

== Other business interests ==
In October 2018, a court attempted to seize Salvador's possessions to settle a €438,000 debt to Domingos Correia, with whom he had invested in construction in Mozambique. It was found that Salvador had neither money nor possessions legally belonging to him; his home and its furnishings belonged to a former employee, and he received no salary from his construction company Britalar.
