= Matija Mitrović =

Serbian footballer (born 2004)

Personal information
- Date of birth: 12 December 2004 (age 21)
- Place of birth: Belgrade, Serbia and Montenegro
- Height: 1.82 m (6 ft 0 in)
- Position: Midfielder

Team information
- Current team: Vitória SC
- Number: 6

Youth career
- –2019: Red Star Belgrade
- 2019–2021: Chicago Fire FC
- 2021–2023: FK Voždovac

Senior career*
Years	Team	Apps	(Gls)
2022–2024	FK Voždovac	31	(1)
2024–2025	FK Železničar Pančevo	34	(2)
2025–	Vitória SC	18	(2)

International career^{‡}
2022–	Serbia U21	11	(2)
- * Club domestic league appearances and goals as of 25 May 2026 ‡ National team caps and goals as of 4 June 2025

Matija Mitrović (Serbian Cyrillic: Матија Митровић; born 12 December 2004) is a Serbian professional footballer who plays as a midfielder for Vitória SC.

== Early life ==
Mitrović was born on 12 December 2004 in Belgrade, Serbia and Montenegro, and is the son of Serbian footballer Marko Mitrović. At the age of 12, he moved with his family to the United States.

== Club career ==
As a youth player, Mitrović joined the youth academy of Serbian side Red Star Belgrade. In 2019, he joined the youth academy of American side Chicago Fire FC. Following his stint there, he joined the youth academy of Serbian side FK Voždovac in 2021 and was promoted to the club's senior team in 2023, where he made thirty-one league appearances and scored one goal.

During the summer of 2024, he signed for Serbian side FK Železničar Pančevo, where he made thirty-four league appearances and scored two goals. Ahead of the 2025–26 season, he signed for Portuguese side Vitória SC. On 10 January 2026, Mitrovic came on from the bench in the Portuguese Taça da Liga final against Braga in which Vitória Guimarães won 2-1.

== International career ==
Mitrović is a Serbia youth international. On 19 November 2024, he debuted for the Serbia national under-21 football team during a 2–1 away friendly win over the Turkey national under-21 football team.

== Honours ==
Individual

- Primeira Liga Goal of the Month: September/October 2025

Vitória SC

- Taça da Liga: 2025–26
