= CE Santanyí =

Spanish association football club

Santanyí
- Full name: Club Esportiu Santanyí
- Founded: 1968
- Ground: Estadi Municipal; Santanyí, Balearic Islands, Spain
- Capacity: 4,000
- Chairman: Tomeu Estelrich
- Manager: Carlos Martínez
- League: Tercera Federación – Group 11
- 2025–26: Tercera Federación – Group 11, 12th of 18
Home colours	Away colours

Club Esportiu Santanyí (Club Deportivo Santañí in Spanish) is a football team based in Santanyí in the autonomous community of Balearic Islands. Founded in 1968, it plays in the Tercera Federación – Group 11. Its stadium is Estadi Municipal de Santanyí with a capacity of 4,000 seats. It used to be the reserve team of Atlético Baleares from 2018 to 2024.

== History ==
Club Esportiu Santanyí was founded in 1968. The 2007-08 season it was able to play for promotion to the Segunda División B, but it lost the first tie against CD Mirandés by an overall result of 3-0.

On 22 July 2018, Santanyí reached an agreement with CD Atlético Baleares to become their reserve team. On 30 May 2024, the agreement came to an end.

Current Olympique Lyonnais manager Carlos Vicens played two seasons for Santanyí and was later the head coach of the team between 2013 and 2016.

== Season to season ==
Season	Tier	Division	Place	Copa del Rey
1968–69	5	2ª Reg.	7th	
1969–70	5	2ª Reg.	16th	
1970–71	5	2ª Reg.	8th	
1971–72	5	2ª Reg.	7th	
1972–73	6	2ª Reg.	4th	
1973–74	6	2ª Reg.	6th	
1974–75	6	2ª Reg.	4th	
1975–76	6	2ª Reg.	10th	
1976–77	6	2ª Reg.	11th	
1977–78	7	2ª Reg.	1st	
1978–79	6	1ª Reg.	5th	
1979–80	5	Reg. Pref.	4th	
1980–81	5	Reg. Pref.	5th	
1981–82	4	3ª	19th	
1982–83	5	Reg. Pref.	2nd	
1983–84	4	3ª	19th	
1984–85	5	Reg. Pref.	1st	
1985–86	4	3ª	9th	
1986–87	4	3ª	14th	
1987–88	4	3ª	18th	

Season	Tier	Division	Place	Copa del Rey
1988–89	4	3ª	19th	
1989–90	5	Reg. Pref.	10th	
1990–91	5	Reg. Pref.	17th	
1991–92	5	Reg. Pref.	7th	
1992–93	5	Reg. Pref.	5th	
1993–94	5	Reg. Pref.	8th	
1994–95	5	Reg. Pref.	3rd	
1995–96	4	3ª	18th	
1996–97	5	Reg. Pref.	13th	
1997–98	5	Reg. Pref.	10th	
1998–99	5	Reg. Pref.	20th	
1999–2000	6	1ª Reg.	2nd	
2000–01	5	Reg. Pref.	1st	
2001–02	4	3ª	6th	
2002–03	4	3ª	12th	
2003–04	4	3ª	2nd	
2004–05	4	3ª	10th	
2005–06	4	3ª	9th	
2006–07	4	3ª	10th	
2007–08	4	3ª	4th	

Season	Tier	Division	Place	Copa del Rey
2008–09	4	3ª	3rd	
2009–10	4	3ª	6th	
2010–11	4	3ª	7th	
2011–12	4	3ª	7th	
2012–13	4	3ª	14th	
2013–14	4	3ª	20th	
2014–15	5	Reg. Pref.	5th	
2015–16	5	Reg. Pref.	2nd	
2016–17	5	Reg. Pref.	4th	
2017–18	4	3ª	17th	
2018–19	4	3ª	16th	N/A (Note: Reserve team of Atlético Baleares.)
2019–20	4	3ª	13th	N/A
2020–21	4	3ª	5th / 2nd	N/A
2021–22	5	3ª RFEF	6th	N/A
2022–23	5	3ª Fed.	5th	N/A
2023–24	5	3ª Fed.	6th	N/A
2024–25	5	3ª Fed.	11th	
2025–26	5	3ª Fed.	12th	
2026–27	5	3ª Fed.		

- 24 seasons in Tercera División
- 6 seasons in Tercera Federación/Tercera División RFEF
