= 2025–26 Taça da Liga =

Tournament details
- Country: Portugal
- Dates: 28 October 2025 – 10 January 2026
- Teams: 8

Final positions
- Champions: Vitória de Guimarães (1st title)
- Runners-up: Braga

Tournament statistics
- Matches played: 7
- Goals scored: 28 (4 per match)
- Attendance: 165,192 (23,599 per match)
- Top goal scorer: Alioune Ndoye (3 goals)

The 2025–26 Taça da Liga was the nineteenth edition of the Taça da Liga (also known as Allianz Cup for sponsorship reasons), a football league cup competition organised by the Liga Portuguesa de Futebol Profissional and contested exclusively by clubs competing in the two professional divisions of Portuguese football – the top-tier Primeira Liga and the second-tier Liga Portugal 2. It was the second season featuring only eight teams in the competition.

== Format ==
As in the season before, the top six teams from the Primeira Liga and the top two non-reserve teams from the Liga Portugal 2 were paired according to their league positions to play single-leg quarter-final matches:

- 1st place (Primeira Liga) vs. 2nd place (Liga Portugal 2)
- 2nd place (Primeira Liga) vs. 1st place (Liga Portugal 2)
- 3rd place (Primeira Liga) vs. 6th place (Primeira Liga)
- 4th place (Primeira Liga) vs. 5th place (Primeira Liga)

The winners qualified to the final-four tournament, which was played at a neutral venue and comprised two single-leg semi-finals and a final. The final four was played at the Estádio Dr. Magalhães Pessoa, in Leiria for the sixth season in a row.

== Qualified teams ==
Team	Tier	Rank
Sporting CP	Primeira Liga	1st place
Benfica	Primeira Liga	2nd place
Porto	Primeira Liga	3rd place
Braga	Primeira Liga	4th place
Santa Clara	Primeira Liga	5th place
Vitória de Guimarães	Primeira Liga	6th place
Tondela	Liga Portugal 2	1st place
Alverca	Liga Portugal 2	2nd place

== Quarter-finals ==
In this round, the higher-ranked teams played at home.

28 October 2025	Sporting CP	5–1	Alverca	Lisbon
20:15 WET	Quenda 21', 58'; Blopa 30', 70'; Ioannidis 81'	Report	Sandro Lima 85'	Stadium: Estádio de Alvalade; Attendance: 23,085; Referee: Hélder Carvalho

29 October 2025	Braga	5–0	Santa Clara	Braga
19:15 WET	Víctor 7'; Lelo 24'; Navarro 73'; Rodrigues 84'; Moscardo 88'	Report		Stadium: Estádio Municipal de Braga; Attendance: 6,574; Referee: David Rafael Silva

29 October 2025	Benfica	3–0	Tondela	Lisbon
20:45 WET	Otamendi 41' (pen.); Lukébakio 83'; Pavlidis 90+5'	Report		Stadium: Estádio da Luz; Attendance: 50,314; Referee: Carlos Macedo

4 December 2025	Porto	1–3	Vitória de Guimarães	Porto
20:15 WET	Veiga 8'	Report	Oliveira 38' (pen.); Samu 53'; Camara 79' (pen.)	Stadium: Estádio do Dragão; Attendance: 33,875; Referee: Hélder Carvalho

== Final-four ==
The final-four was played from 6 to 10 January 2026 in Estádio Dr. Magalhães Pessoa, Leiria, and comprised the semi-finals and final of the competition.

=== Bracket ===
Semi-finals
6 January 2026 – Leiria
Sporting	1
Vitória de Guimarães	2
7 January 2026 – Leiria
Benfica	1
Braga	3

Final
10 January 2026 – Leiria
Vitória de Guimarães	2
Braga	1

=== Semi-finals ===
6 January 2026
20:00 WET

Sporting CP	1–2	Vitória de Guimarães
Suárez 13'	Report	Ndoye 90+2', 90+11'

Estádio Dr. Magalhães Pessoa, Leiria
Attendance: 14,268
Referee: Luís Godinho

7 January 2026
20:00 WET

Benfica	1–3	Braga
Pavlidis 64' (pen.)	Report	Víctor 19'; Zalazar 33'; Lagerbielke 81'

Estádio Dr. Magalhães Pessoa, Leiria
Attendance: 17,469
Referee: João Pinheiro

=== Final ===
10 January 2026
20:00 WET

Vitória de Guimarães	2–1	Braga
Samu 59' (pen.); Ndoye 83'	Report	Dorgeles 17'

Estádio Dr. Magalhães Pessoa, Leiria
Attendance: 19,607
Referee: Hélder Malheiro
