= Sandro Vidigal =

Portuguese footballer (born 2004)

Personal information
- Full name: Sandro Miguel Rodrigues Vidigal
- Date of birth: 28 July 2007 (age 19)
- Place of birth: Lisbon, Portugal
- Height: 1.72 m (5 ft 8 in)
- Position: Winger

Team information
- Current team: Eupen (on loan from Braga)
- Number: 17

Youth career
- 2018–2021: CF Benfica
- 2021–2022: Belenenses
- 2022–2025: Braga

Senior career*
| Years | Team | Apps | (Gls) |
| 2025– | Braga B | 13 | (4) |
| 2025– | Braga | 4 | (0) |
| 2026– | → Eupen (loan) | 3 | (2) |

International career^{‡}
| 2022 | Portugal U15 | 2 | (0) |
| 2024 | Portugal U17 | 2 | (0) |
| 2025 | Portugal U18 | 5 | (1) |
| 2025– | Portugal U19 | 8 | (0) |
- * Club domestic league appearances and goals as of 5 September 2026 ‡ National team caps and goals as of 31 March 2026

Sandro Miguel Rodrigues Vidigal (born 28 July 2007) is a Portuguese professional football player who plays as a winger for Challenger Pro League club Eupen on loan from Primeira Liga club Braga.

== Club career ==
Vidigal is a product of the youth academies of the Portuguese clubs CF Benfica, Belenenses and Braga. On 28 March 2024, he signed his first professional contract with Braga until 2027. He made his senior and professional debut with Braga in a 1–0 UEFA Europa League win over Levski Sofia on 31 July 2025, assisting his side's winning goal. On 1 September 2025, he extended his contract with Braga until 2030.

== International career ==
Vidigal is a youth international for Portugal. He was called up to the Portugal U19s in November 2025.

== Career statistics ==
As of match played 25 January 2026

Appearances and goals by club, season and competition
| Club | Season | League | | | Cup | | League Cup | | Europe | | Other | | Total | |
| Club | Season | Division | Apps | Goals | Apps | Goals | Apps | Goals | Apps | Goals | Apps | Goals | Apps | Goals |
|---|---|---|---|---|---|---|---|---|---|---|---|---|---|---|
| Braga B | 2025–26 | Liga 3 | 3 | 0 | — | | — | | — | | — | | 3 | 0 |
| Braga | 2025–26 | Primeira Liga | 4 | 0 | 1 | 0 | — | | — | | — | | 5 | 0 |
| Career total | | | 7 | 0 | 1 | 0 | 0 | 0 | 0 | 0 | 0 | 0 | 8 | 0 |
