= Guillem Víctor =

Spanish footballer (born 2008)

Personal information
- Full name: Guillem Víctor Delgado
- Date of birth: 3 May 2007 (age 19)
- Place of birth: Sant Cugat del Vallès, Spain
- Height: 1.77 m (5 ft 10 in)
- Position: Defender

Team information
- Current team: Barcelona
- Number: 40

Youth career
- –2026: Barcelona

Senior career*
| Years | Team | Apps | (Gls) |
| 2025– | Barcelona B | 21 | (0) |
| 2026– | Barcelona | 0 | (0) |

International career^{‡}
| 2024 | Spain U18 | 3 | (0) |
| 2025– | Spain U19 | 2 | (0) |
- * Club domestic league appearances and goals as of 31 October 2026 ‡ National team caps and goals as of 19 December 2025

Guillem Víctor Delgado (born 3 May 2007) is a Spanish professional footballer who plays as a defender for Barcelona.

== Club career ==
As a youth player, Víctor joined the youth academy of La Liga side Barcelona at under-12 level, where he played in the UEFA Youth League.

Ahead of the 2025–26 season, he was promoted to the club's reserve team, where he was regarded to have established himself as a regular starter while playing for them.

== International career ==
Víctor is a Spain youth international and has represented the country internationally at under-18 and under-19 levels. Altogether, he made three appearances and scored zero goals while playing for the Spain national under-18 football team.

On 17 September 2025, he debuted for the Spain national under-19 football team during a 3–0 friendly win over the Australia men's national under-18 soccer team.

== Style of play ==
Víctor plays as a defender. Right-footed, he is known for his versatility. Spanish newspaper Mundo Deportivo wrote in 2026 that he "is a right-back by trade, but he has also featured on the left, as a center-back, a central midfielder, an interior midfielder, and a winger".

== Personal life ==
Víctor was born on 3 May 2007 and is the younger brother of Spanish footballer Pau Víctor. Born in Sant Cugat del Vallès, Spain, he is a native of the city. As a hobby, he enjoys playing golf.
