= Jean-Baptiste Gorby =

French footballer (born 2002)

Personal information
- Date of birth: 25 July 2002 (age 24)
- Place of birth: Nantes, France
- Height: 1.81 m (5 ft 11 in)
- Position: Midfielder

Team information
- Current team: Braga
- Number: 29

Youth career
- 2017–2019: Nantes
- 2019–2021: Braga

Senior career*
Years	Team	Apps	(Gls)
2021–2024	Braga B	10	(1)
2021–	Braga	72	(3)
2023–2024	→ Paços de Ferreira (loan)	34	(2)
- * Club domestic league appearances and goals as of 25 October 2026

Jean-Baptiste Gorby (born 25 July 2002) is a French professional footballer who plays as a midfielder for Primeira Liga club Braga.

== Career ==
Born at Nantes, of Haitian and Malagasy descent, a youth product of Nantes, Gorby moved to the Portuguese club Braga on 14 August 2021. In his first season with Braga, he worked his way up their U19s, then their reserves before reaching their senior team within the span of a couple of months. He made his professional debut for Braga as a late sub in a 2–0 Primeira Liga win over Estoril on 5 December 2021.

On 7 July 2023, Braga announced that Gorby would be sent on a season-long loan to Paços de Ferreira, recently relegated to Liga Portugal 2.

== Career statistics ==
As of match played 25 October 2026

Appearances and goals by club, season and competition
Club	Season	League			Taça de Portugal		Taça da Liga		Europe		Total	
Club	Season	Division	Apps	Goals	Apps	Goals	Apps	Goals	Apps	Goals	Apps	Goals
Braga B	2021–22	Liga 3	7	1	—		—		—		7	1
Braga B	2022–23	Liga 3	3	0	—		—		—		3	0
Braga B	Total		10	1	—		—		—		10	1
Braga	2021–22	Primeira Liga	7	1	1	0	0	0	1 (Note: Appearance in UEFA Europa League)	0	9	1
Braga	2022–23	Primeira Liga	7	0	3	0	2	0	1	0	13	0
Braga	2024–25	Primeira Liga	24	1	2	0	1	0	11	0	38	1
Braga	2025–26	Primeira Liga	28	1	4	0	2	0	19	3	53	4
Braga	2026–27	Primeira Liga	6	0	0	0	0	0	5 (Note: Appearances in UEFA Conference League)	0	11	0
Braga	Total		72	3	10	0	5	0	37	3	125	6
Paços de Ferreira (loan)	2023–24	Liga Portugal 2	34	2	1	0	1	0	—		36	2
Career total			116	6	11	0	6	0	37	3	170	9
