= Rodrigo Zalazar =

Uruguayan footballer (born 1999)

Personal information
- Full name: Rodrigo Zalazar Martínez
- Date of birth: 12 August 1999 (age 27)
- Place of birth: Albacete, Spain
- Height: 1.78 m (5 ft 10 in)
- Position: Attacking midfielder

Team information
- Current team: Sporting CP
- Number: 17

Youth career
- 2007–2014: Albacete
- 2014–2016: Málaga
- 2016–2017: San Félix
- 2017–2018: Málaga

Senior career*
| Years | Team | Apps | (Gls) |
| 2018–2019 | Atlético Malagueño | 0 | (0) |
| 2019–2022 | Eintracht Frankfurt | 0 | (0) |
| 2019–2020 | → Korona Kielce (loan) | 8 | (0) |
| 2019–2020 | → Korona Kielce II (loan) | 10 | (3) |
| 2020–2021 | → FC St. Pauli (loan) | 34 | (6) |
| 2021–2022 | → Schalke 04 (loan) | 30 | (6) |
| 2022–2023 | Schalke 04 | 22 | (1) |
| 2023–2026 | Braga | 79 | (26) |
| 2026– | Sporting CP | 9 | (2) |

International career^{‡}
| 2018–2019 | Uruguay U20 | 19 | (1) |
| 2023– | Uruguay | 12 | (3) |
- * Club domestic league appearances and goals as of 7 November 2026 ‡ National team caps and goals as of 18 November 2026

Rodrigo Zalazar Martínez (born 12 August 1999) is a Uruguayan professional footballer who plays as an attacking midfielder for Primeira Liga club Sporting CP and the Uruguay national team.

== Club career ==
=== Early career ===
Zalazar joined the youth categories of Albacete Balompié in 2007, aged eight. In 2014, he moved to Málaga CF and was initially assigned to the Cadete squad.

In 2018, after finishing his formation, Zalazar was promoted to Málaga's reserve team in Segunda División B, but remained unregistered for the entire season after the club had no free registration spots; he then refused a loan to a Tercera División side, as his contract was due to expire in the following summer.

=== Eintracht Frankfurt ===
On 2 July 2019, Zalazar signed a four-year contract with Bundesliga club Eintracht Frankfurt on 2 July 2019.

==== Loan to Korona Kielce ====
Three days after joining Eintracht Frankfurt, Ekstraklasa side Korona Kielce signed Zalazar on a one-year loan deal for 2019–20 season. He made his professional debut on 20 July 2019, coming on as a 70th minute substitute for Erik Pačinda in a 1–0 league win against Raków Częstochowa.

Rarely used in the first team, Zalazar also played for Korona Kielce II in the III liga, scoring three goals in 10 appearances.

==== Loan to FC St. Pauli ====
On 6 August 2020, 2. Bundesliga club FC St. Pauli announced the signing of Zalazar on a season-long loan deal. He scored his first professional goal on 19 October, netting the equalizer through a penalty in a 2–2 home draw against 1. FC Nürnberg.

Zalazar finished the 2020–21 season with six goals in 35 appearances overall, as St. Pauli finished in the 10th position.

=== Schalke 04 ===
On 4 August 2021, Zalazar agreed to join fellow second division side Schalke 04 on a season-long loan with an option to make the move permanent until 2026. On 25 March 2022, Schalke exercised this option, and he agreed to a permanent four-year contract with the club, effective as of 1 July. He finished the campaign as a regular starter as the club won promotion to the Bundesliga as champions, scoring the decisive goal in a 3–2 victory over St. Pauli that secured promotion.

Zalazar made his debut in the main category of German football on 7 August 2022, starting in a 3–1 away loss against 1. FC Köln. He scored his first goal in the top tier six days later, netting the opener in a 2–2 home draw against Borussia Mönchengladbach.

In June 2023, after Schalke's relegation back to the second level, newspaper Bild reported that Zalazar was seeking a move away from the club.

=== Braga ===
In July 2023, Zalazar joined Primeira Liga side Braga, signing a four-year contract for a reported transfer fee of €6m.

=== Sporting CP ===
On 15 May 2026, Sporting CP announced the signing of Zalazar for a fee of €30 million, and a release clause of €80 million. This made him the most expensive transfer between two Portuguese clubs, surpassing the previous €20 million record Porto paid for David Carmo. Zalazar made his debut for the club on 8 August 2026, scoring a goal and providing an assist in a 2–2 draw against Estrela da Amadora.

== International career ==
Born in Spain to Uruguayan parents, Zalazar was eligible to represent both Uruguay and Spain at international level. While his older brother chose Spain, he followed his father's footsteps and chose to play for Uruguay.

Zalazar started to feature for the nation's under-20 team in 2018, being also included in Fabián Coito's squad for the 2019 South American U-20 Championship in January 2019. He played seven matches in the tournament, helping his team to finish third.

In June 2023, Zalazar received his first call-up to the senior team for friendly matches against Nicaragua and Cuba. He made his debut on 14 June, scoring two goals in a 4–1 win against the former. On 31 May 2026, he was named in Uruguay's 26-man squad for the 2026 FIFA World Cup.

== Personal life ==
Zalazar comes from a footballing family. He is the son of former Uruguayan international footballer José Zalazar. Nicknamed El Osito (The Bear Cub), he inherited the nickname from his father, who was known as El Oso (The Bear). He was born in Albacete, Castilla–La Mancha, while his father was playing for the local club Albacete. Both of his brothers, Kuki Zalazar and Mauro Zalazar, are also professional footballers who have represented Spain and Uruguay, respectively, at youth level.

== Career statistics ==
=== Club ===
As of match played 19 September 2026

Appearances and goals by club, season and competition
| Club | Season | League | | | National cup (Note: Includes Polish Cup, DFB-Pokal, Taça de Portugal) | | League cup (Note: Includes Taça da Liga) | | Europe | | Total | |
| Club | Season | Division | Apps | Goals | Apps | Goals | Apps | Goals | Apps | Goals | Apps | Goals |
|---|---|---|---|---|---|---|---|---|---|---|---|---|
| Atlético Malagueño | 2018–19 | Segunda División B | 0 | 0 | — | | — | | — | | 0 | 0 |
| Eintracht Frankfurt | 2019–20 | Bundesliga | 0 | 0 | 0 | 0 | — | | 0 | 0 | 0 | 0 |
| Eintracht Frankfurt | 2020–21 | Bundesliga | 0 | 0 | 0 | 0 | — | | — | | 0 | 0 |
| Eintracht Frankfurt | 2021–22 | Bundesliga | 0 | 0 | 0 | 0 | — | | 0 | 0 | 0 | 0 |
| Eintracht Frankfurt | Total | | 0 | 0 | 0 | 0 | 0 | 0 | 0 | 0 | 0 | 0 |
| Korona Kielce II (loan) | 2019–20 | III liga | 10 | 3 | — | | — | | — | | 10 | 3 |
| Korona Kielce (loan) | 2019–20 | Ekstraklasa | 8 | 0 | 1 | 0 | — | | — | | 9 | 0 |
| FC St. Pauli (loan) | 2020–21 | 2. Bundesliga | 34 | 6 | 1 | 0 | — | | — | | 35 | 6 |
| Schalke 04 (loan) | 2021–22 | 2. Bundesliga | 30 | 6 | 2 | 1 | — | | — | | 32 | 7 |
| Schalke 04 | 2022–23 | Bundesliga | 22 | 1 | 1 | 1 | — | | — | | 23 | 2 |
| Schalke 04 | Total | | 52 | 7 | 3 | 2 | 0 | 0 | 0 | 0 | 55 | 9 |
| Braga | 2023–24 | Primeira Liga | 32 | 6 | 2 | 2 | 4 | 0 | 11 (Note: Nine appearances in UEFA Champions League, two appearances in UEFA Europa League) | 0 | 49 | 8 |
| Braga | 2024–25 | Primeira Liga | 19 | 4 | 1 | 1 | 1 | 0 | 9 (Note: Appearances in UEFA Europa League) | 3 | 30 | 8 |
| Braga | 2025–26 | Primeira Liga | 28 | 16 | 2 | 0 | 2 | 1 | 15 | 6 | 47 | 23 |
| Braga | Total | | 79 | 26 | 5 | 3 | 7 | 1 | 35 | 9 | 126 | 39 |
| Sporting CP | 2026–27 | Primeira Liga | 7 | 1 | 0 | 0 | 0 | 0 | 1 (Note: Appearances in UEFA Champions League) | 1 | 8 | 2 |
| Career total | | | 190 | 43 | 10 | 5 | 7 | 1 | 36 | 10 | 243 | 59 |

=== International ===
As of match played 17 November 2026

Appearances and goals by national team and year
| National team | Year | Apps | Goals |
|---|---|---|---|
| Uruguay | 2023 | 1 | 2 |
| Uruguay | 2024 | 1 (Note: Includes a Non-FIFA friendly played against the Basque Country, which is counted as an official match by the Uruguayan Football Association.) | 0 |
| Uruguay | 2025 | 6 | 0 |
| Uruguay | 2026 | 4 | 1 |
| Total | | 12 | 3 |

Scores and results list Uruguay's goal tally first, score column indicates score after each Zalazar goal.

List of international goals scored by Rodrigo Zalazar
| No. | Date | Venue | Opponent | Score | Result | Competition |
|---|---|---|---|---|---|---|
| 1 | 14 June 2023 | Estadio Centenario, Montevideo, Uruguay | Nicaragua | 2–0 | 4–1 | Friendly |
| 2 | 14 June 2023 | Estadio Centenario, Montevideo, Uruguay | Nicaragua | 4–0 | 4–1 | Friendly |
| 3 | 6 October 2026 | Salt Lake Stadium, Kolkata, India | India | 3–1 | 6–1 | Friendly |

== Honours ==
Schalke 04

- 2. Bundesliga: 2021–22

Braga

- Taça da Liga: 2023–24

Individual

- Primeira Liga Midfielder of the Month: January 2024, December 2025, February 2026, March 2026
- Primeira Liga Team of the Season: 2025–26
