= Carlos Vicens =

Spanish footballer and manager

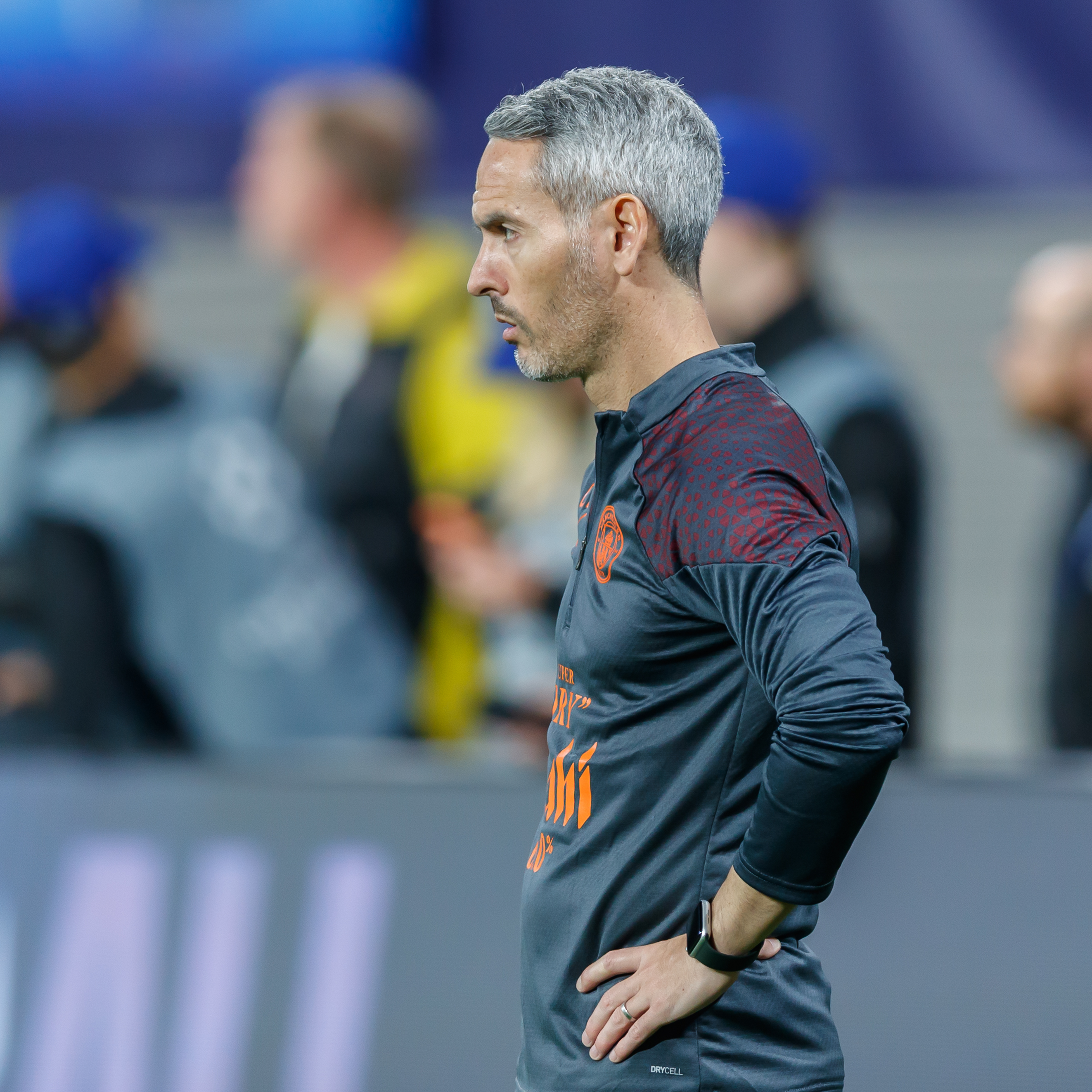
- Vicens in 2023

Personal information
- Full name: Juan Carlos Vicens Gómez
- Date of birth: 12 February 1983 (age 43)
- Place of birth: Ses Salines, Spain
- Height: 5 ft 7 in (1.70 m)
- Position: Midfielder

Team information
- Current team: Lyon (manager)

Youth career
- Colonia
- Ses Salines
- La Salle
- 1997–2002: Mallorca

College career
Years	Team	Apps	(Gls)
2007–2008	Texas Longhorns		

Senior career*
Years	Team	Apps	(Gls)
2002–2003	Ferriolense		
2003–2005	Santanyí		
2005–2006	Atlético Baleares		
2006–2007	Cala d'Or		
2008	Austin Aztex U23		
2008–2010	Campos		

Managerial career
- 2010–2013: Ses Salines
- 2013–2016: Santanyí
- 2015–2017: Llosetense (assistant)
- 2021–2025: Manchester City (assistant)
- 2025–2026: Braga
- 2026–: Lyon
- * Club domestic league appearances and goals

Juan Carlos Vicens Gómez (born 12 February 1983) is a Spanish professional football manager and former player who played as a midfielder. He is currently the manager of Ligue 1 club Lyon.

== Playing career ==
Born in Colònia de Sant Jordi, Ses Salines, Mallorca, Balearic Islands, Vicens played for the youth sides of Colonia, Ses Salines and La Salle, before joining Mallorca at the age of 14. After finishing his formation in 2002, he was promoted to farm team Ferriolense in Tercera División.

Vicens continued to play mainly in the lower leagues in the following years, representing Santanyí in the fourth tier, and Atlético Baleares and Cala d'Or in the Regional Preferente de Mallorca. In 2007, he moved abroad to study economics at the University of Texas at Austin, and played for the Texas Longhorns.

In April 2008, Vicens was announced as one of the 21 players of the newly created Austin Aztex U23. After the season ended in July, he was offered a one-year deal to play for the first team, Austin Aztex, but rejected after the financial offer was not "life-changing", and returned to his home country to play for Campos in the fourth division.

Vicens retired in 2010, aged 27, due to an injury.

== Managerial career ==
=== Early career ===
Immediately after retiring, Vicens returned to Ses Salines after being named manager of the club in the Tercera Regional. He led the club to two consecutive promotions before returning to Santanyí on 2 July 2013, now as manager.

Despite suffering relegation in his first season, Vicens remained in charge of Santanyí in the following two seasons, missing out promotion in the play-offs. During the 2015–16 campaign, he also worked as an assistant to Nico López at Llosetense.

Vicens departed Santanyí on 18 June 2016, but continued to work with López at Llosetense.

=== Manchester City ===
In July 2017, Vicens moved to England to join Manchester City as a youth coach, having sent his CV to the club the previous year. He worked as an assistant to the Under-12s and Under-13s in his first season, and was promoted as an assistant to the Under-18s the following year.

In August 2020, Vicens was promoted to Under-18s head coach, replacing Gareth Taylor. In his first season in charge, he guided the Under-18s to win the FA Youth Cup.

In July 2021, Vicens was again promoted, becoming Pep Guardiola's assistant in charge of the first team. On 6 May of the following year, Eredivisie team Heracles Almelo announced that Vicens would take charge of its first team from 1 July 2022, after having signed a two-year contract. However, in June, a few days after Heracles were relegated for the first time in 17 years, the deal collapsed and Vicens chose to stay on at City instead. Vicens was part of Guardiola's coaching staff during the club's treble-winning 2022–23 season.

=== Braga ===
On 28 May 2025, Vicens was appointed manager of Portuguese Primeira Liga side Braga, signing a three-year contract. In his first season, he led the team to the 2025–26 UEFA Europa League semi-finals after defeating Real Betis in the quarter-finals. After winning in the home game against SC Freiburg, an early red card to Mario Dorgeles in the return leg in Germany helped Freiburg to a comeback, winning 4–3 on aggregate. Braga also reached the 2026 Taça da Liga final after beating José Mourinho's Benfica in the semi-finals, but lost against local rivals Vitória Guimarães. The team finished in the fourth position in the 2025–26 Primeira Liga, qualifying for the 2026–27 UEFA Conference League.

In his second season, he was sacked on 20 October 2026 after three defeats in a row in October against Sporting CP, Copenhagen and Gil Vicente.

=== Lyon ===
On 9 November 2026, Vicens was appointed manager of French Ligue 1 side Lyon, signing an eighteen-month contract.

== Managerial statistics ==
As of 21 November 2026

Coaching record by team and tenure
Team	Nat	From	To	Record							
Team	Nat	From	To	P	W	D	L	GF	GA	GD	Win %
Ses Salines	(Spain)	1 July 2010	2 July 2013	108	63	18	27	224	127	+97	58.33
Santanyí	(Spain)	2 July 2013	18 June 2016	120	42	26	52	157	179	−22	35.00
Braga	(Portugal)	28 May 2025	20 October 2026	76	41	19	16	136	72	+64	53.95
Lyon	(France)	9 November 2026	Present	1	1	0	0	1	0	+1	100.00
Total				305	147	63	95	518	378	+140	48.20
