= Yanis da Rocha =

Portuguese footballer (born 2004)

Personal information
- Full name: Yanis Franklin da Rocha
- Date of birth: 10 May 2004 (age 22)
- Place of birth: Colombes, France
- Height: 1.89 m (6 ft 2 in)
- Position: Defensive midfielder

Team information
- Current team: Portimonense
- Number: 21

Youth career
- 2011–2013: FC Franconville
- 2013–2019: FC Gisors
- 2019–2020: Évreux
- 2020–2022: Chambly
- 2022–2012: Troyes

Senior career*
Years	Team	Apps	(Gls)
2023	Troyes II	2	(0)
2023–2026	Braga B	22	(0)
2025–2026	Braga	4	(0)
2026–	Portimonense	4	(1)

International career^{‡}
2022–2023	Portugal U19	6	(0)
2023–2024	Portugal U20	8	(0)
Medal record
Men's football
Representing Portugal
UEFA European Under-19 Championship
Runner-up	2023 Malta
- * Club domestic league appearances and goals as of 6 September 2026 ‡ National team caps and goals as of 13:25, 27 October 2025 (UTC)

Yanis Franklin da Rocha (born 10 May 2004) is a professional football player who plays as a defensive midfielder for Liga Portugal 2 club Portimonense. Born in France, he is a youth international for Portugal.

== Club career ==
Da Rocha is a product of the youth academies of the French clubs FC Franconville, FC Gisors, Évreux, Chambly and Troyes. On 28 July 2023, he joined Braga on a contract until 2026, and was first assigned to their reserves. On 7 July 2025, he joined the senior Braga team for their pre-season training. He made his professional debut with the senior Braga team in a 1–0 2025–26 UEFA Europa League qualifying win over Levski Sofia on 31 July 2025.

== International career ==
Da Rocha was born in France to a Portuguese father and French mother of Guadeloupean and Martiniquais descent, and holds dual French and Portuguese citizenship. He played for the Portugal U19s at the 2023 UEFA European Under-19 Championship, where they came in second place.

== Career statistics ==
As of match played 26 April 2026

Appearances and goals by club, season and competition
Club	Season	League			Cup		League Cup		Europe		Other		Total	
Club	Season	Division	Apps	Goals	Apps	Goals	Apps	Goals	Apps	Goals	Apps	Goals	Apps	Goals
Troyes II	2022–23	National 3	2	0	—		—		—		—		2	0
Braga B	2024–25	Liga 3	16	1	—		—		—		—		16	1
Braga B	2025–26	Liga 3	5	0	—		—		—		—		5	0
Braga B	Total		21	1	—		—		—		—		21	1
Braga	2025–26	Primeira Liga	4	0	1	0	0	0	4 (Note: Appearances in UEFA Europa League)	0	—		9	0
Career total			27	1	1	0	0	0	4	0	0	0	32	1
