= Diogo Sousa (footballer, born 1993) =

Portuguese footballer

Personal information
- Full name: Diogo Leite de Sousa
- Date of birth: 30 April 1998 (age 28)
- Place of birth: Lisbon, Portugal
- Height: 1.76 m (5 ft 9 1/2 in)
- Position: Right back

Team information
- Current team: Valadares Gaia

Youth career
- 2006–2012: Infesta

Senior career*
Years	Team	Apps	(Gls)
2012–2013	Ermesinde	31	(1)
2013–2014	Infesta	34	(2)
2014–2015	Padroense	27	(0)
2015–2017	Infesta	62	(3)
2017–2019	Vitória	0	(0)
2018–2019	→ Oliveirense (loan)	21	(0)
2019	Fátima	13	(0)
2020–	Valadares Gaia	3	(0)
- * Club domestic league appearances and goals as of 15:25, 12 February 2020 (UTC)

Diogo Leite de Sousa (born 8 August 1993) is a Portuguese footballer who plays for Valadares Gaia FC as a right back.

== Football career ==
Sousa signed with Oliveirense on loan from Vitória in January 2018. On 25 March 2018, Sousa made his professional debut with Oliveirense in a 2017–18 LigaPro match against Real.
