= Diogo Sousa (footballer, born 2006) =

Portuguese footballer (born 2006)

Personal information
- Full name: Diogo Lobão de Sousa
- Date of birth: 20 January 2006 (age 20)
- Place of birth: Guimarães, Portugal
- Height: 1.76 m (5 ft 9 in)
- Position: Midfielder

Team information
- Current team: Strasbourg
- Number: 23

Youth career
- Vitória Guimarães

Senior career*
Years	Team	Apps	(Gls)
2023–2025	Vitória Guimarães B	16	(0)
2024–2026	Vitória Guimarães	22	(1)
2026–	Strasbourg	6	(1)

International career^{‡}
2021–2022	Portugal U16	10	(0)
2022–2023	Portugal U17	15	(2)
2023	Portugal U18	4	(0)
2024–2025	Portugal U19	5	(0)
2026–	Portugal U21	4	(0)
- * Club domestic league appearances and goals as of 11 October 2026 ‡ National team caps and goals as of 6 October 2026

Diogo Lobão de Sousa (born 20 January 2006) is a Portuguese professional footballer who plays as a midfielder for Strasbourg.

== Club career ==
As a youth player, Sousa joined the youth academy of Portuguese side Vitória Guimarães and was promoted to the club's senior team in 2025, where he made twenty-two league appearances and scored one goal and helped the club win the 2025–26 Taça da Liga. Following his stint there, he signed for French Ligue 1 side Strasbourg ahead of the 2026–27 season.

== International career ==
Sousa is a Portugal youth international. During May 2023, he played for the Portugal national under-17 football team at the 2023 UEFA European Under-17 Championship.

== Style of play ==
Sousa plays as a midfielder. Portuguese news website Bola na Rede wrote in 2026 that he is "capable of linking sectors, speeding up the game and offering composure with the ball".

== Career statistics ==
As of match played 11 October 2026

Appearances and goals by club, season and competition
Club	Season	League			Cup		League Cup		Europe		Total	
Club	Season	Division	Apps	Goals	Apps	Goals	Apps	Goals	Apps	Goals	Apps	Goals
Vitória Guimarães B	2024–25	Campeonato de Portugal	16	0	—		—		—		16	0
Vitória Guimarães	2025–26	Primeira Liga	22	1	3	0	3	0	—		28	1
Strasbourg	2026–27	Ligue 1	6	1	0	0	—		—		6	1
Career total			44	2	3	0	3	0	0	0	50	2
