= Diego Rodrigues =

Portuguese footballer (born 2005)

Personal information
- Full name: Diego Henrique Oliveira Rodrigues
- Date of birth: 24 May 2005 (age 21)
- Place of birth: Guimarães, Portugal
- Height: 1.85 m (6 ft 1 in)
- Position: Midfielder

Team information
- Current team: Braga
- Number: 50

Youth career
- 2013–2016: CC Taipas
- 2016–2020: Vitória de Guimarães
- 2020–2024: Braga

Senior career*
Years	Team	Apps	(Gls)
2023–	Braga B	25	(2)
2025–	Braga	30	(2)

International career^{‡}
2022	Portugal U17	4	(0)
2022–2023	Portugal U18	8	(1)
2023	Portugal U19	2	(1)
2024–2025	Portugal U20	7	(0)
2025–	Portugal U21	4	(0)
- * Club domestic league appearances and goals as of 19 October 2026 ‡ National team caps and goals as of 20:28, 31 March 2026 (UTC)

Diego Henrique Oliveira Rodrigues (born 24 May 2005) is a Portuguese professional footballer who plays as a midfielder for Braga.

== Career ==
Rodrigues is a youth product of the academies of CC Taipas and Vitória de Guimarães, before moving to Braga in 2020 to finish his development. On 2 June 2023, he signed his first professional contract with Braga until 2027 and was promoted to their reserves. He made his senior and professional debut with Braga as a substitute in a 2–1 Primeira Liga win over Benfica on 4 January 2025.

== International career ==
Born in Portugal, Rodrigues holds dual Portuguese-Belgian citizenship. He is a youth international for Portugal, having played up to the Portugal U20s in 2024.

== Personal life ==
Rodrigues' father, Ronaldo Rodrigues, was a Belgian-born footballer who moved to Portugal to continue his career. Ronaldo is of Portuguese and Belgian descent, and was a youth international for Belgium. Through his father, Diego holds Belgian citizenship. Diego's great-grandfather, Noël Cras, was also a professional footballer in Belgium for SV Waregem.

== Career statistics ==
As of match played 19 October 2026

Appearances and goals by club, season and competition
Club	Season	League			Taça de Portugal		Taça da Liga		Europe		Total	
Club	Season	Division	Apps	Goals	Apps	Goals	Apps	Goals	Apps	Goals	Apps	Goals
Braga B	2023–24	Liga 3	7	0	—		—		—		7	0
Braga B	2024–25	Liga 3	16	2	—		—		—		16	2
Braga B	Total		23	2	—		—		—		23	2
Braga	2024–25	Primeira Liga	8	0	2	0	1	0	0	0	11	0
Braga	2025–26	Primeira Liga	20	1	2	0	3	1	12 (Note: Appearances in UEFA Europa League)	0	37	2
Braga	2026–27	Primeira Liga	2	1	0	0	0	0	4 (Note: Appearances in UEFA Conference League)	1	6	2
Braga	Total		30	2	4	0	5	1	16	1	55	4
Career total			53	4	4	0	5	1	16	1	78	6
