= Pau Víctor =

Spanish footballer (born 2001)

Personal information
- Full name: Pau Víctor Delgado
- Date of birth: 26 November 2001 (age 24)
- Place of birth: Sant Cugat del Vallès, Spain
- Height: 1.84 m (6 ft 0 in)
- Positions: Forward; winger

Team information
- Current team: Braga
- Number: 10

Youth career
- 2008–2015: Junior
- 2015–2018: Sabadell
- 2018–2020: Girona

Senior career*
Years	Team	Apps	(Gls)
2020–2024	Girona	8	(0)
2020–2022	Girona B	45	(14)
2022–2023	→ Sabadell (loan)	36	(7)
2023–2024	→ Barcelona B (loan)	35	(18)
2024–2025	Barcelona	21	(2)
2025–	Braga	43	(15)

International career
2025–	Catalonia	2	(0)
- * Club domestic league appearances and goals as of 18:51, 8 November 2026 (UTC)

Pau Víctor Delgado (born 26 November 2001) is a Spanish professional footballer who plays as a forward or winger for Primeira Liga club Braga.

== Club career ==
=== Girona ===
Born in Sant Cugat del Vallès, Barcelona, Catalonia, Víctor began his career with hometown side Junior Futbol Club, and joined Girona's youth setup in 2018, from Sabadell. On 20 July 2020, before even having appeared for the reserves, he made his professional debut coming on as a second-half substitute for Jairo Izquierdo in a 0–2 Segunda División away loss against Alcorcón.

Víctor alternated between the first and reserve teams during the 2020–21 season, and scored his first senior goals on 13 December 2020, netting a brace in a 3–1 Tercera División home win over Grama. In the 2021–22 campaign, he featured exclusively for the B's, being their top scorer with eight goals as they missed out promotion in the play-offs.

==== Loan to Sabadell ====
On 29 August 2022, Víctor and teammate Álex Sala were loaned out to Primera Federación side Sabadell for one year. He scored seven goals and provided six assists to help the team to stay in the third tier.

==== Loan to Barcelona Atlètic ====
On 17 August 2023, Víctor renewed his contract with Girona until 2025 and was loaned to Barcelona, being assigned to the reserve side also in the third division. In October, he was called up to the main squad for a match against Granada, and also featured on the bench in two Copa del Rey matches (against Barbastro and Unionistas de Salamanca).

With the B-team, Víctor was an ever-present figure and scored a career-best 20 goals, as they missed out promotion to Segunda División in the play-offs.

=== Barcelona ===
On 24 July 2024, Víctor joined Barça permanently, signing a contract until 2029 and being included in the first team squad. On 30 July 2024, he made his debut in a friendly match against Manchester City, in which he scored the opening goal in a 2–2 draw. He made his second appearance on 3 August in another friendly against Real Madrid, scoring a brace in a 2–1 victory. Víctor made his La Liga debut on 17 August, replacing Lamine Yamal late into a 2–1 away win over Valencia.

Due to Barcelona's administrative failure to register both Víctor and teammate Dani Olmo for the second half of the season, there was a possibility of both players becoming free agents. However, on 8 January 2025, the Consejo Superior de Deportes approved the registration of both Olmo and Víctor, meaning that both players could participate for Barcelona in La Liga, the UEFA Champions League, the Copa del Rey and the eventual Supercopa de España final victory against Real Madrid.

=== Braga ===
On 25 July 2025, Víctor signed for Portuguese club Braga on a contract until 2030, for a fee of €12 million. Braga presented him as an important signing for their attacking line and described the move as a key step in his development and playing opportunities.

== Personal life ==
Víctor's younger brother Guillem is also a footballer. A right-back, he plays in the FC Barcelona Atlètic.

== Career statistics ==
As of match played 21 November 2026

Appearances and goals by club, season and competition
Club	Season	League			National cup (Note: Includes Copa del Rey, Taça de Portugal)		League cup (Note: Includes Taça da Liga)		Europe		Other		Total	
Club	Season	Division	Apps	Goals	Apps	Goals	Apps	Goals	Apps	Goals	Apps	Goals	Apps	Goals
Girona	2019–20	Segunda División	1	0	0	0	—		—		0	0	1	0
Girona	2020–21	Segunda División	7	0	3	0	—		—		0	0	10	0
Girona	Total		8	0	3	0	—		—		0	0	11	0
Girona B	2020–21	Tercera División	14	6	—		—		—		1 (Note: Appearance in Tercera División play-offs)	0	15	6
Girona B	2021–22	Tercera División RFEF	31	8	—		—		—		2 (Note: Appearances in Tercera División RFEF play-offs)	0	33	8
Girona B	Total		45	14	—		—		—		3	0	48	14
Sabadell (loan)	2022–23	Primera Federación	36	7	0	0	—		—		0	0	36	7
Barcelona B (loan)	2023–24	Primera Federación	35	18	—		—		—		4 (Note: Appearances in Primera Federación play-offs)	2	39	20
Barcelona	2024–25	La Liga	21	2	2	0	—		6 (Note: Appearances in UEFA Champions League)	0	0	0	29	2
Braga	2025–26	Primeira Liga	32	10	4	0	3	2	17 (Note: Appearances in UEFA Europa League)	5	—		56	17
Braga	2026–27	Primeira Liga	11	5	1	0	1	0	9 (Note: Appearances in UEFA Conference League)	2	—		22	7
Braga	Total		43	15	5	0	4	2	26	7	—		78	24
Career total			186	56	10	0	4	2	32	7	7	2	241	67

== Honours ==
Barcelona

- La Liga: 2024–25
- Copa del Rey: 2024–25
- Supercopa de España: 2025

Individual

- Primera Federación top scorer: 2023–24
