= João Carvalho (footballer, born 2004) =

Portuguese footballer (born 2004)

Personal information
- Full name: João Gonçalo Carapinha Carvalho
- Date of birth: 9 April 2004 (age 22)
- Place of birth: Loures, Portugal
- Height: 1.92 m (6 ft 4 in)
- Position: Goalkeeper

Team information
- Current team: Braga
- Number: 78

Youth career
- 2012–2019: Benfica
- 2019–2020: Alverca
- 2020–2024: Braga

Senior career*
Years	Team	Apps	(Gls)
2024–2026	Braga B	53	(0)
2026–	Braga	1	(0)

International career^{‡}
2021–2022	Portugal U18	4	(0)
2022	Portugal U19	1	(0)
2022–2023	Portugal U20	3	(0)
2024–	Portugal U21	13	(0)
- * Club domestic league appearances and goals as of 10:48, 25 September 2026 (UTC) ‡ National team caps and goals as of 10:48, 25 September 2026 (UTC)

João Gonçalo Carapinha Carvalho (born 9 April 2004) is a Portuguese footballer who plays as a goalkeeper for Braga.

== Club career ==
Born in Loures in the Lisbon District, Carvalho began playing as a youth with Benfica and Alverca before joining Braga in 2020. In June 2022, after playing a season of 31 games for the under-19 team, he signed a four-year contract and was promoted to the under-23 team. On the first day of 2025, while playing for the B-team in Liga 3, he extended his contract to 2028.

On 16 May 2026, Carvalho made his first-team debut in the Primeira Liga, on the last day of the season at home to C.F. Estrela da Amadora. He came on as a substitute for the last ten minutes in place of Lukáš Horníček and conceded an added-time goal by Stefan Leković in a 2–2 draw. Later that month it was reported that due to Braga having three other goalkeepers, he would be loaned out for more experience.

== International career ==
Carvalho was chosen for the Portugal under-21 team at the 2025 UEFA European Under-21 Championship in Slovakia. In November 2025, José Sá was allowed to leave the Portugal national team due to the death of his grandfather, and Carvalho was called up for the 2026 FIFA World Cup qualifier away to the Republic of Ireland. Diogo Costa played in goal in the 2–0 loss on 13 November at the Aviva Stadium.
