= Espinho (Braga) =

- Civil parish
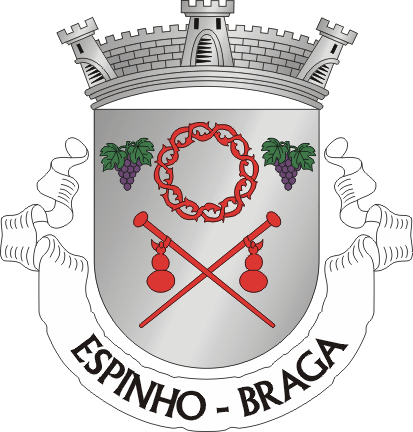
- Coat of arms

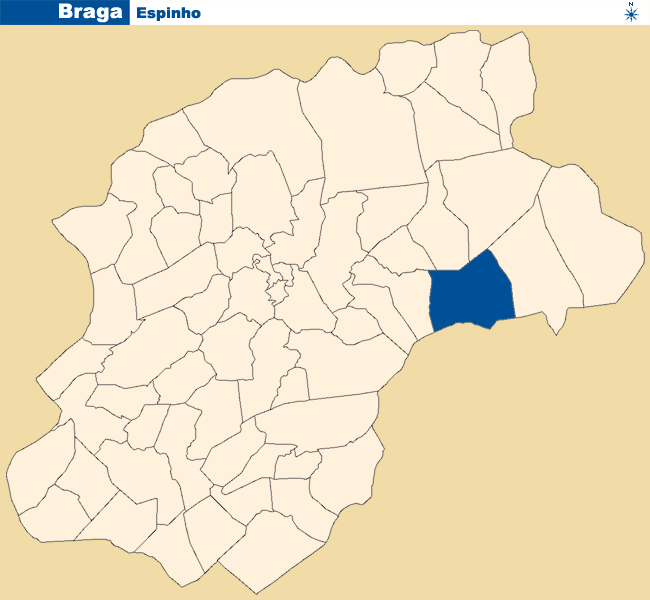
- Coordinates: 41.547°N 8.362°W
- Country: Portugal
- Region: Norte
- Intermunic. comm.: Cávado
- District: Braga
- Municipality: Braga

Area
  - Total: 4.48 km^{2} (1.73 sq mi)

Population (2011)
  - Total: 1,181
  - Density: 264/km^{2} (683/sq mi)
- Time zone: UTC+00:00 (WET)
  - Summer (DST): UTC+01:00 (WEST)

Espinho is a Portuguese freguesia ("civil parish"), located in the municipality of Braga. The population in 2011 was 1,181, in an area of 4.48 km^{2} (1.73 sq mi). The Sameiro Sanctuary is situated in Espinho.
