= Estádio Dr. Magalhães Pessoa =

Football stadium in Leiria, Portugal

Coordinates: 39°44′55″N 8°48′47″W

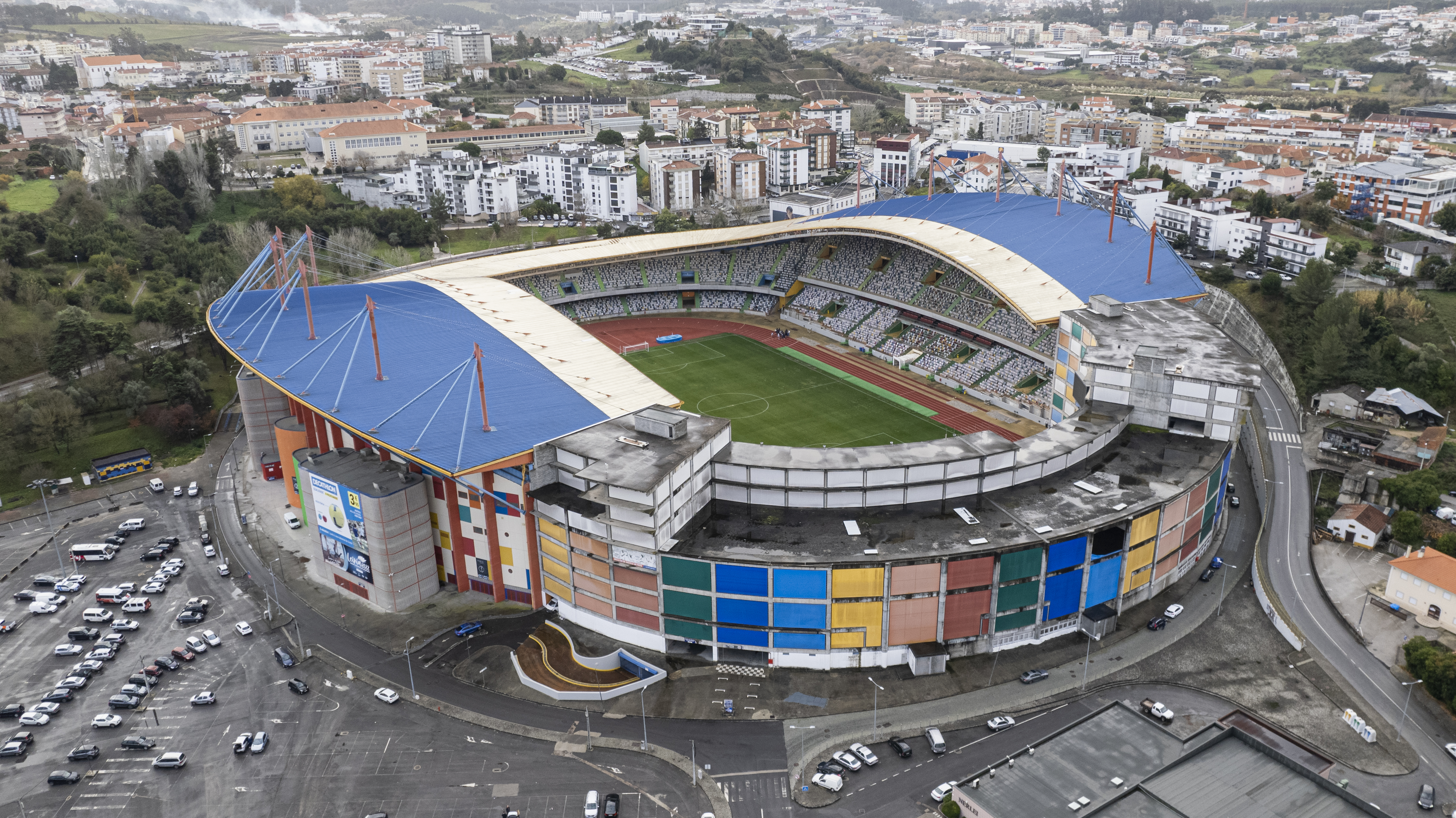
- UEFA
- Interactive map of Estádio Dr. Magalhães Pessoa
- Former names: Estádio Municipal de Leiria
- Location: Leiria, Portugal
- Owner: Municipality of Leiria
- Capacity: 23,888 + 5,478 (provisional bench)
- Surface: Grass
- Record attendance: 29,160 (17 June 2004); Croatia 2–2 France
- Field size: 105 x 68 m

Construction
- Built: 1958; 68 years ago 2003; 23 years ago
- Opened: 19 November 2003
- Cost: €83.207 million
- Architect: Tomás Taveira

Tenants
- União de Leiria (2003–2011, 2013–present); Portugal national football team (selected matches)

The Estádio Dr. Magalhães Pessoa (English: Dr. Magalhães Pessoa Stadium) is a football stadium in Leiria, Portugal, built as a venue for the UEFA Euro 2004 finals held in Portugal. It is the home for Leiria's main football club, União de Leiria. It was designed by Tomás Taveira in 2003. The stadium contains different coloured seats as well as an athletics track and has a capacity of 23,888 seats.

The stadium has hosted the Supertaça Cândido de Oliveira (the Portuguese Super Cup) in 2006 and 2007 and the final of the Taça da Liga (the League Cup) in 2014 and from 2021 to 2026.

The stadium was severely damaged in January 2026 as a result of Storm Kristin.

== Games held ==
During the UEFA Euro 2004 finals, the stadium hosted Croatia's matches against Switzerland in a 0–0 draw and France in a 2–2 draw in Group B.

It also hosted the 2006 Supertaça Cândido de Oliveira where Porto defeated Vitória de Setúbal 3–0 with goals from Anderson, Adriano and Vieirinha. The following year, in 2007, it again played host to the Supertaça, but this time Sporting CP won the title over Porto by a score of 1–0.

This venue has hosted numerous Portuguese League Cup finals that have crowned various champions, such as Benfica, Sporting CP, FC Porto, Braga and Vitória SC.

== Design ==
The Estádio Dr. Magalhães Pessoa intends to complement its surrounding territory with a part of the stadium that opens towards the scenery and another part that shows the defence wall of a medieval castle dominating the city. The project, created by architect Tomás Taveira, consists of continuous tiers that run a wavy course. The tiers are highest at the main stands (in the center of the stadium) and gently wind down in correspondence with the south stand behind one of the goals. This leaves an opening towards the city, the woods and the castle that overlooks the stadium.

The roof follows the course of the tiers which are placed according to an elliptical framework that is brusquely interrupted at the north stand. The north stand contained a temporary and uncovered tribune that ran parallel to one of the playing field's short sides.

The seats are of different colours, placed randomly. The use of different tint colours characterizes the entire stadium. The roof is constructed with a transparent material that has external light filtered which makes the yellow colour of the metallic structure stand out. The roof appears to float on the tiers; it is, however, hanging on steel tie-beams (in blue) and tall pennons (in red) that are only located above the main tribunes. The external perimeter is characterized by squared panels of lively tints placed on a natural white background separated by the red metallic pillars.

== UEFA Euro 2004 ==
The following UEFA Euro 2004 matches were held in the stadium.

Date	Team #1	Result	Team #2	Round	Attendance
13 June 2004	Switzerland	0–0	Croatia	Group B	24,090
17 June 2004	Croatia	2–2	France	Group B	29,160

== Portugal national team matches ==
The following national team matches were held in the stadium.

#	Date	Score	Opponent	Competition
1.	22 January 1986	1–1	Finland	Friendly
2.	29 March 2000	2–1	Denmark	Friendly
3.	19 November 2003	8–0	Kuwait	Friendly
4.	8 September 2004	4–0	Estonia	World Cup 2006 qualification
5.	17 November 2007	1–0	Armenia	Euro 2008 qualifying
6.	26 March 2011	1–1	Chile	Friendly
7.	26 May 2012	0–0	Macedonia	Friendly
8.	5 March 2014	5–1	Cameroon	Friendly
9.	25 March 2016	0–1	Bulgaria	Friendly
10.	29 March 2016	2–1	Belgium	Friendly
11.	14 November 2017	1–1	United States	Friendly
12.	10 June 2026	2–1	Nigeria	Friendly
