= Mario Dorgeles =

Ivorian footballer who plays for FC Nordsjælland

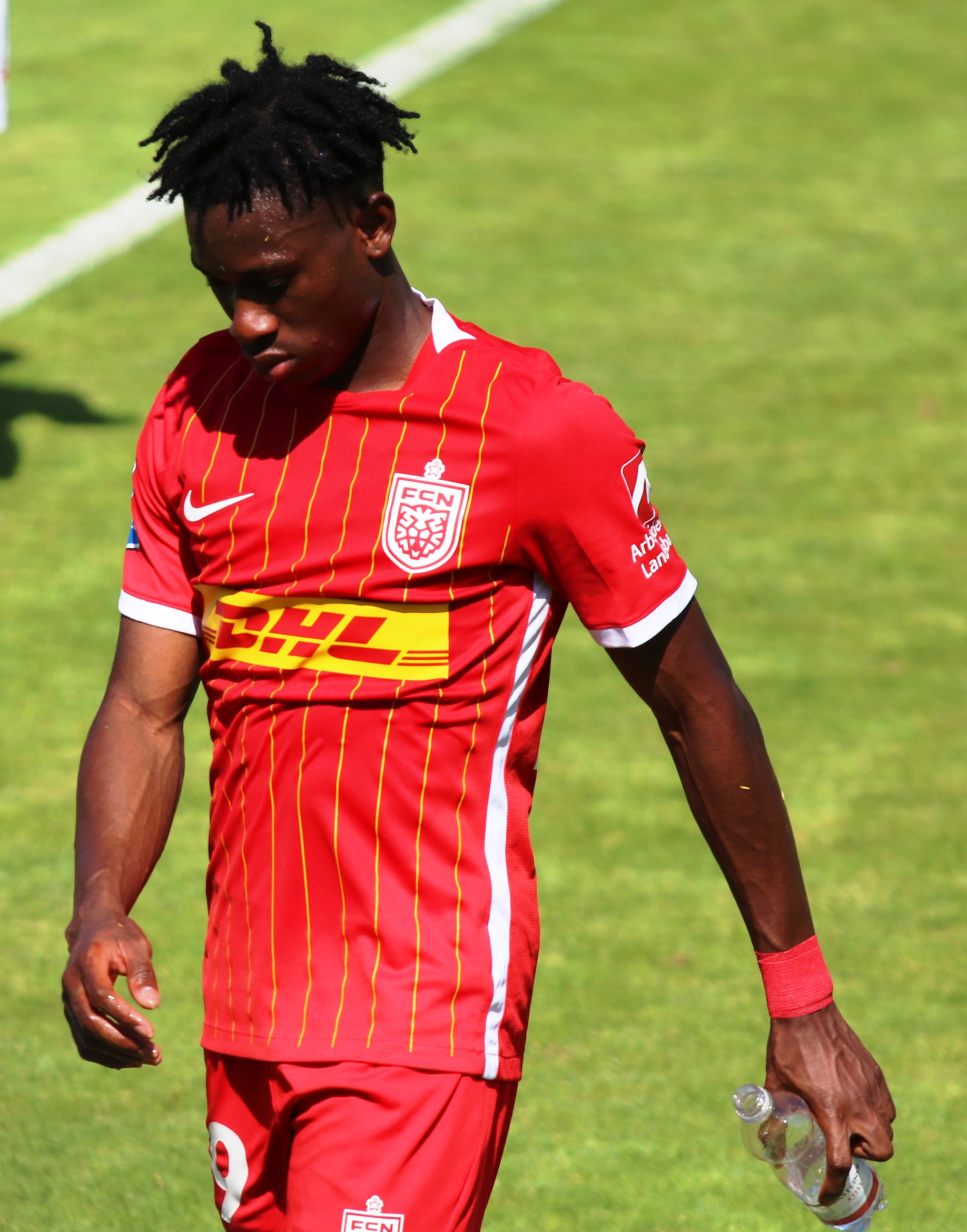
- Dorgeles with Nordsjælland in 2023

Personal information
- Full name: Maho Yepie Dorgeles Guy-Mario Bocha
- Date of birth: 7 August 2004 (age 22)
- Place of birth: Andokoi, Ivory Coast
- Height: 1.77 m (5 ft 10 in)
- Position: Midfielder

Team information
- Current team: Braga
- Number: 20

Youth career
- Right to Dream

Senior career*
Years	Team	Apps	(Gls)
2022–2025	Nordsjælland	68	(3)
2025–	Braga	26	(2)

International career^{‡}
2023–	Ivory Coast U23	2	(0)
2024–	Ivory Coast	4	(0)
- * Club domestic league appearances and goals as of 25 October 2026 ‡ National team caps and goals as of 22:14, 18 November 2025 (UTC)

Maho Yepie Dorgeles Guy-Mario Bocha (born 7 August 2004) is an Ivorian footballer who plays as a midfielder for Primeira Liga club Braga and the Ivory Coast national team.

== Club career ==
=== FC Nordsjælland ===
Dorgeles joined Danish Superliga team FC Nordsjælland on 9 August 2022 from the Right to Dream Academy. Already on 14 August 2022, Dorgeles got his official debut for Nordsjælland in Danish Superliga game against AaB, when he came off the bench for the start of the second half.

Despite playing 52 games in his first two seasons in Nordsjælland, young Dorgeles was primarily a reserve player. Despite this, there were reports of interest from several big clubs in the Premier League. From the 2024–25 season, Dorgeles was given a more central role in the team, and was given the number 8 back in August 2024.

=== Braga ===
On 4 July 2025, Dorgeles joined Primeira Liga club Braga by signing a contract until 2030.

== International career ==
Dorgeles was included in the Ivory Coast U23 squad for friendlies in November 2023. Dorgeles made his debut for the national team on 21 November 2023 against Iraq under-23 national team.

In August 2024, Dorgeles was called up for the Ivory Coast national team for the first time ever. He was one of 25 players selected ahead of the matches against Zambia and Chad in the 2025 Africa Cup of Nations qualification Group G on September 6 and 10.

== Career statistics ==
=== Club ===
As of match played 29 October 2026

Appearances and goals by club, season and competition
Club	Season	League			National cup (Note: Includes Danish Cup)		League cup		Continental		Total	
Club	Season	Division	Apps	Goals	Apps	Goals	Apps	Goals	Apps	Goals	Apps	Goals
Nordsjælland	2022–23	Danish Superliga	15	0	6	0	—		—		21	0
Nordsjælland	2023–24	Danish Superliga	23	1	1	0	—		7 (Note: Appearances in UEFA Europa Conference League)	0	31	1
Nordsjælland	2024–25	Danish Superliga	30	2	1	0	—		—		31	2
Nordsjælland	Total		68	3	8	0	—		7	0	83	3
Braga	2025–26	Primeira Liga	20	2	3	2	2	1	14 (Note: Appearances in UEFA Europa League)	2	39	7
Braga	2026–27	Primeira Liga	6	0	0	0	1	0	6	0	13	0
Braga	Total		26	2	3	2	3	1	20	2	52	7
Career total			94	5	11	2	3	1	27	2	135	10

=== International ===
As of match played 18 November 2025

National team	Year	Apps	Goals
Ivory Coast	2024	3	0
Ivory Coast	2025	1	0
Total		4	0
