= S.C. Braga =

Portuguese professional football club

Coordinates: 41°33′45″N 8°25′51″W

Braga
- Full name: Sporting Clube de Braga
- Nicknames: Os Arcebispos (The Archbishops); Os Arsenalistas (The Arsenalists); Os Guerreiros do Minho (The Minho Warriors)
- Founded: 19 January 1921; 105 years ago
- Stadium: Estádio Municipal de Braga
- Capacity: 30,286
- Owner(s): Qatar Sports Investments (29.6%); Sundown Investments Limited (17.04%)
- President: António Salvador
- Head coach: Franclim Carvalho
- League: Primeira Liga
- 2025–26: Primeira Liga, 4th of 18
- Website: scbraga.pt
Home colours	Away colours	Third colours

Sporting Clube de Braga (Portuguese pronunciation: [sɨˈpɔɾtĩ ˈkluβɨ ðɨ ˈβɾaɣɐ]), commonly known as Sporting Braga, or simply Braga, is a Portuguese sports club from the city of Braga. Best known for the men's professional football team playing in the Primeira Liga, the top flight of Portuguese football at the Estádio Municipal de Braga, it also has departments for athletics, badminton, basketball, billiards, boccia, boxing, esports, futsal, karate, kickboxing, muay thai, swimming, taekwondo and volleyball.

Founded on 19 January 1921, Braga are nicknamed, Braguistas, and Os Arsenalistas (The Arsenalists) for the shirt colour that resembles English club Arsenal. Since 2003, Braga have played their home matches at the Estádio Municipal de Braga, which replaced the Estádio 1º de Maio, now used for the club's reserve team.

In the 2000s, Braga became one of Portugal's most decorated clubs (5th) and has had some success in European competitions, winning the last UEFA Intertoto Cup (the only Portuguese club to do so) in 2008, and reaching the final of the UEFA Europa League in 2011. Domestically, they have also won another 7 domestic trophies: three Taça de Portugal in 1965–66, 2015–16, and in 2020–21, and the Taça da Liga three times in 2012–13, 2019–20 and 2023–24.

The club qualified for the 2010–11 UEFA Champions League, reaching the competition for the first time in their history, by eliminating Celtic and Sevilla following a 2nd-place finish in the 2009–10 Primeira Liga season. This represented the highest finish in the league in the club's history. Moreover, in the 2010s, Braga have cultivated a reputation for spotting and developing young talent, and have remained focused on developing a youth system.

Braga have a long-standing rivalry with nearby club Vitória Guimarães, with whom they contest the Derby do Minho.

== History ==
Existing records say that in 1919, two years before the formal foundation, a group of Braga residents who were sympathisers of the Lisbon-based Sporting Clube de Portugal (Sporting CP) came up with the name Sporting Clube de Braga. The equipment used was also identical to that of Sporting CP. During weekend matches at Campo das Goladas, the friends from Braga wore the classic Sporting CP Stromp kit, with a green and white shirt split down the middle. Influenced by sympathisers of Sport Lisboa e Benfica (Benfica), a solution was found in 1921 to please everyone. The name remained true to Sporting CP, but the kit changed to red and white, in honour of the connection of some of the Braga fans to Lisbon's Benfica.

Until 1945, SC Braga imitated Benfica's kit. Red shirt, shorts and white socks. That year, at the end of World War II, the club adopted the Arsenal version for their second team, with white sleeves. Braga changed their kits to their current red and white during the 1945–46 season (for the reserve squad) and the 1946–47 season (for the first team). The change, according to one version of the story, was at the behest of their president, José Antunes Guimarães, who had business connections in London and was an Arsenal fan; according to an alternate version, it was József Szabó, Braga's Hungarian coach, who asked the president to change the uniform to an Arsenal-style red and white. In 1947, Braga won the Second division title in the new kit, reaching the First division for the first time. Braga even renamed their youth team Arsenal de Braga.

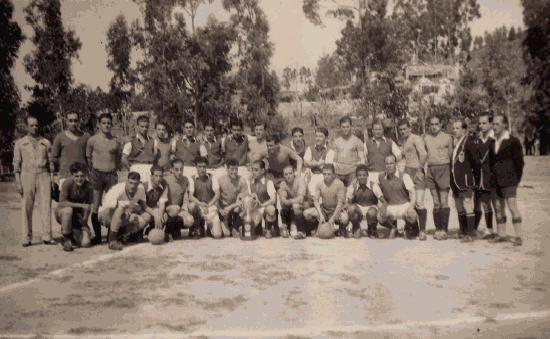
One of the first matches played in Arsenal-style kits against R C Celta Vigo

Braga's emblem is the city of Braga's shield with Mother Mary and baby Jesus with the blue from the city's shield changed to red. On the top of the emblem is the golden Mural Crown of Braga, with the name "Sporting Clube de Braga" on it. Many Braga fans have said that Mother Mary gives them luck. The fans of Braga are known as Arsenalistas due to their team home kit that resembles that of English club Arsenal. They are also known as Bracarenses because of being from the city of Bracari, later named Bracara Augusta, city of Portugal that is now known as Braga.

In the 1960s and 1970s, Braga began to climb up the league ladder and eventually participated in the UEFA competitions. Braga's recent run of successive European participations began in the 2004–05 UEFA Cup after finishing fifth in the league under Jesualdo Ferreira's first full season in the club. In the 2006–07 UEFA Cup, the side reached the last 16 before a 6–4 aggregate loss to Tottenham Hotspur. That summer, the club signed a three-year sponsorship deal with French insurance company Axa, who took over the naming rights for the stadium for €4.5 million; this was renewed for a further three years in 2010.

Braga won the 2008 UEFA Intertoto Cup and again reached the UEFA Cup last 16 in the 2008–09 season, where they lost by a single goal to Paris Saint-Germain.

Braga was runners-up in the league for the only time in its history in the 2009–10 season under Domingos Paciência. Entering the UEFA Champions League for the first time, in the fourth qualifying round Braga beat Sevilla 1–0 at home and 4–3 away, thus making the group stage. On 15 September 2010, Braga were heavily defeated 6–0 by Arsenal in its first group stage match. Eliminated in third place, they dropped into the Europa League and reached the final in Dublin, where they lost to a goal by FC Porto's Radamel Falcao.

Braga won the Taça da Liga for the first time in 2013 under José Peseiro, with one goal from Alan against Porto. Two years later, Sérgio Conceição's side lost on penalties to Sporting CP in the Taça de Portugal final, but Paulo Fonseca's triumphed over Porto on the same method in 2016 to win their first such cup in 50 years.

In 2019–20, Braga went through four managers over the course of the season. The second of these, Ruben Amorim, led them to a league cup victory over Porto, with Ricardo Horta scoring in added time to secure the trophy on home soil.

On 28 July 2020, Carlos Carvalhal was announced as the new head coach, after 14 years away from the club. He led the club to the league cup final again, where they lost to Amorim's new team Sporting, but won the 2021 Taça de Portugal Final 2–0 against Benfica. He would leave the club and be replaced by Artur Jorge after the 2021–22 season ended.

On 10 October 2022, 21.67% of the club shares were bought for €80 million by Qatar Sports Investments (QSI), a subsidiary of Qatar Investment Authority (QIA), the state-run sovereign-wealth fund in Qatar owned by Tamim bin Hamad Al Thani, the Emir of Qatar, who is also the owner of Ligue 1 side Paris Saint-Germain through the QSI. The season ended with third place and a return to the Champions League after 11 years, as well as club records for points (78), wins (25) and goals (75).

SC Braga's success in the first quarter of the 21st century, including participations in the UEFA Champions League, winning the Taça de Portugal (Portuguese Cup) in 2016 and 2021, reaching the UEFA Europa League final in 2011, which they lost to FC Porto and the inauguration of the Cidade Desportiva, improved its position on the UEFA club rankings. In Portugal, SC Braga managed to establish themselves as one of the top teams of the league.

== Finances and ownership ==
=== Results ===
In 2023, Sporting Clube de Braga - Futebol, SAD's net profit was 20.377 million euros and the EBITDA was 29.779 million euros.

=== Ownership ===
Sporting Clube de Braga – Futebol, SAD is listed on Euronext Lisbon. By 2023, Sporting Clube de Braga, the sports club as a whole, retained 36.99% of the football SAD (Sporting Clube de Braga – Futebol, SAD) stock, followed by Qatar Sports Investments with 29.60%, and then Sundown Investments Limited with 17.04%. Other investors held the remaining 16.37%.

== Rivalries ==
=== Rivalry with Vitória SC ===
The Derby do Minho is the rivalry between Sporting Clube de Braga and Vitória Sport Clube in the Minho region of northern Portugal. This derby is marked by great tension and passion, reflecting not only sporting competition, but also a historical and cultural rivalry between the cities of Braga and Guimarães that began even before the formation of the Kingdom of Portugal. Since then it has been a struggle in all aspects of society, sport, culture, the economy. Football has only become a means used to transpose the rivalry. Considered to be one of the most exciting and fiercely contested matches in Portuguese football, the Dérbi Minhoto is eagerly awaited by the fans for the clash between these two cities known for their history and identity.

=== Other rivalries ===
There is also a certain rivalry between Braga, Boavista, Belenenses and Vitória SC, due to the closeness in the number of titles and because they are some of the clubs with the largest number of fans in Portugal, with many people creating arguments to determine which would be the "4th big". However, the distance between these clubs and the Big Three is considerable enough in any sport to be given such a designation.

== League and cup history ==
=== Recent seasons ===
Season	League									Cup	League Cup	Europe (UEFA)		Notes
Season	Div.	Pos.	Pld	W	D	L	GF	GA	Pts	Result	Result	Competition	Result	Notes
2021–22	1st	4th	34	19	8	7	52	31	65	R5	R3	Europa League	QF	
2022–23	1st	3rd	34	25	3	6	75	30	78	RU	QF	Europa League Europa Conference League	GS KPO	
2023–24	1st	4th	34	21	5	8	71	50	68	R5	W	Champions League Europa League	GS L32	
2024–25	1st	4th	34	19	9	6	55	30	66	QF	SF	Europa League	LP	
2025–26	1st	4th	34	16	11	7	64	36	59	QF	RU	Europa League	SF	

== Honours ==
=== National ===
==== League ====
- Segunda Divisão
  - Winners (2): 1946–47, 1963–64

==== Cup ====
- Taça de Portugal
  - Winners (3): 1965–66, 2015–16, 2020–21
- Taça da Liga
  - Winners (3): 2012–13, 2019–20, 2023–24
- Taça Federação Portuguesa de Futebol
  - Winners (1): 1976–77 (First Division)

=== International ===
- UEFA Intertoto Cup
  - Winners (1): 2008 (Outright Winners)

== Players ==
=== Current squad ===
As of 9 September 2026

Note: Flags indicate national team as defined under FIFA eligibility rules; some limited exceptions apply. Players may hold more than one non-FIFA nationality.

No.	Pos.	Nation	Player
2	DF	ESP	Víctor Gómez
4	DF	MLI	Sikou Niakaté
6	MF	BRA	Vitor Carvalho
7	DF	POR	Diogo Travassos
8	MF	POR	João Moutinho (vice-captain)
9	FW	ESP	Fran Navarro
10	FW	ESP	Pau Víctor
11	FW	BRA	Gabriel Silva
12	GK	POR	Tiago Sá
14	DF	SWE	Gustaf Lagerbielke
16	MF	ESP	Tommy Marqués
17	FW	SRB	Jovan Milošević
19	FW	DEN	Jonas Wind
20	MF	CIV	Mario Dorgeles

No.	Pos.	Nation	Player
21	MF	POR	Ricardo Horta (captain)
22	DF	ESP	Sergio Barcia
23	MF	BIH	Denis Huseinbašić
26	DF	GER	Bright Arrey-Mbi
29	MF	FRA	Jean-Baptiste Gorby
31	GK	BRA	Bernardo
34	MF	TUR	Demir Ege Tıknaz
37	DF	BIH	Adrian-Leon Barišić
44	DF	SUI	Adrian Bajrami
50	MF	POR	Diego Rodrigues
73	FW	POR	João Aragão
77	FW	ESP	Gabri Martínez
78	GK	POR	João Carvalho

=== Out on loan ===
Note: Flags indicate national team as defined under FIFA eligibility rules; some limited exceptions apply. Players may hold more than one non-FIFA nationality.

No.	Pos.	Nation	Player
—	GK	MAR	Alaa Bellaarouch (at Dinamo București until 30 June 2027)
—	DF	POR	Francisco Chissumba (at Alverca until 30 June 2027)
—	DF	POR	Leonardo Lelo (at Almería until 30 June 2027)
—	DF	POL	Bartłomiej Wdowik (at Jagiellonia Białystok until 30 June 2027)
—	MF	URU	Thiago Helguera (at Atlético Madrileño until 30 June 2027)

No.	Pos.	Nation	Player
—	MF	POR	Luisinho (at Feirense until 30 June 2027)
—	MF	POR	João Marques (at Torreense until 30 June 2027)
—	FW	MAR	Amine El Ouazzani (at Angers until 30 June 2027)
—	FW	TUN	Ismaël Gharbi (at Leganés until 30 June 2027)
—	FW	POR	Sandro Vidigal (at Eupen until 30 June 2027)

== Personnel ==
As of 23 June 2025

Position	Staff
Head coach	(Spain) Carlos Vicens
Assistant coaches	(Spain) Mario Enguidanos (Spain) Lander García (Spain) Jordi Fernández
Analyst	(Spain) Guillermo Alonso
Goalkeeper coach	(Portugal) Orlando Silva (Portugal) Eduardo
Fitness coach	(Spain) Antonio Gómez
Chief scout	(Angola) Paulo Meneses
Scout	(Portugal) Ernesto Peixoto
Youth chief scout	(Portugal) José Luís Antunes
Head of medical	(Portugal) Vítor Moreira

== Coaching history ==
- (Hungary) József Szabó (1935–37), (1945), (1953–54)
- (Argentina) Mário Imbelloni (1955–56)
- (Portugal) Eduardo Viso (1955–56)
- (Hungary) József Szabó (1956–57), (1960–61)
- (Portugal) António Teixeira (1964–65)
- (Argentina) José Valle (1965–66)
- (Portugal) Manuel Palmeira (1966)
- (Portugal) Rui Sim-Sim (1966)
- (Portugal) Fernando Caiado (1966–67)
- (Argentina) José Valle (1967)
- (Portugal) José Maria Vieira (1967–68)
- (Portugal) Artur Quaresma (1968–69)
- (Portugal) Federico Passos (1969)
- (Portugal) Alberto Pereira (1969–70)
- (Portugal) Joaquim Coimbra (1970)
- (Portugal) José Carlos (1975–76)
- (Portugal) Mário Lino (1976–77)
- (Portugal) Hilário Conceição (1977)
- (Argentina) Mário Imbelloni (1977–78)
- (Portugal) Fernando Caiado (1978–79)
- (Portugal) Hilário Conceição (1979–80)
- (Portugal) Mário Lino (1980–81)
- (Portugal) Quinito (1981–82)
- (Portugal) Juca (1 July 1982 – 30 June 1983)
- (Portugal) Quinito (1983–85)
- (Portugal) Henrique Calisto (1985)
- (Portugal) Humberto Coelho (1 July 1985–87)
- (Portugal) Manuel José (1987–89)
- (Portugal) Raul Águas (1990)
- (Portugal) Carlos Garcia (1990–92)
- (Portugal) Vitor Manuel (1992)
- (Portugal) António Oliveira (1992–94)
- (Portugal) Neca (1994)
- (Portugal) Manuel Cajuda (1 July 1994 – 30 June 1997)
- (Spain) Fernando Castro Santos (1997–98)
- (Spain) Alberto Argibay Pazos (1998)
- (Portugal) Vítor Oliveira (1 July 1998–98)
- (Portugal) Carlos Manuel (1998)
- (Portugal) Manuel Cajuda (1 April 1999 – 30 June 2002)
- (Spain) Fernando Castro Santos (2002–03)
- (Portugal) Jesualdo Ferreira (19 April 2003 – 8 May 2006)
- (Portugal) Carlos Carvalhal (10 May 2006 – 8 November 2006)
- (Portugal) Rogério Gonçalves (13 November 2006 – 19 February 2007)
- (Portugal) Jorge Costa (19 February 2007 – 30 October 2007)
- (Portugal) António Caldas (interim) (31 October 2007 – 11 November 2007)
- (Portugal) Manuel Machado (12 November 2007 – 21 April 2008)
- (Portugal) Jorge Jesus (20 May 2008 – 15 June 2009)
- (Portugal) Domingos (20 June 2009 – 30 June 2011)
- (Portugal) Leonardo Jardim (1 July 2011 – 30 June 2012)
- (Portugal) José Peseiro (1 July 2012 – 30 June 2013)
- (Portugal) Jesualdo Ferreira (1 July 2013 – 23 February 2014)
- (Portugal) Jorge Paixão (23 February 2014 – 23 May 2014)
- (Portugal) Sérgio Conceição (2014–15)
- (Portugal) Paulo Fonseca (2015–16)
- (Portugal) José Peseiro (1 July 2016 – 15 December 2016)
- (Portugal) Jorge Simão (17 December 2016 – 26 April 2017)
- (Portugal) Abel Ferreira (27 April 2017 – 30 June 2019)
- (Portugal) Ricardo Sá Pinto (3 July 2019 – 23 December 2019)
- (Portugal) Ruben Amorim (27 December 2019 – 3 March 2020)
- (Portugal) Custódio (3 March 2020 – 1 July 2020)
- (Portugal) Artur Jorge (1 July 2020 – 28 July 2020)
- (Portugal) Carlos Carvalhal (28 July 2020 – 15 May 2022)
- (Portugal) Artur Jorge (15 May 2022 – 3 April 2024)
- (Portugal) Rui Duarte (3 April 2024 – 18 May 2024)
- (Portugal) Daniel Sousa (24 May 2024 – 12 August 2024)
- (Portugal) Carlos Carvalhal (12 August 2024 – 28 May 2025)
- (Spain) Carlos Vicens (28 May 2025 – present)
