= Taça da Liga =

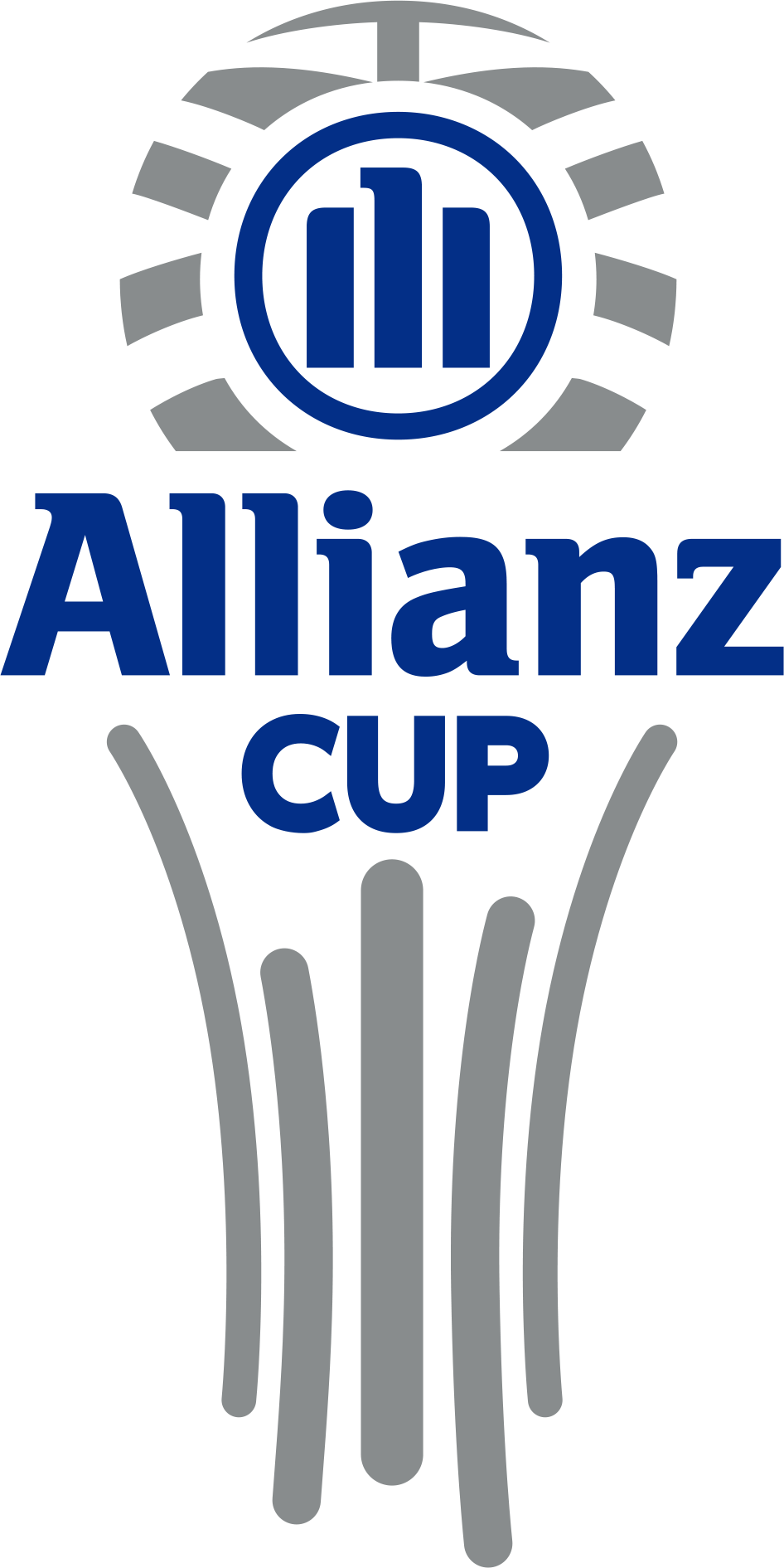
- Organiser(s): Liga Portuguesa de Futebol Profissional
- Founded: 2007
- Region: Portugal
- Teams: 36 (2021–22 season)
- Current champions: Vitória de Guimarães (1st title)
- Most championships: Benfica (8 titles)
- Broadcaster(s): SIC (final); Sport TV
- Website: ligaportugal.pt/allianzcup
- 2026–27 Taça da Liga

The Taça da Liga (Portuguese pronunciation: [ˈtasɐ ðɐ ˈliɣɐ]), known outside Portugal as Portuguese League Cup, is an annual club football competition organised by the Liga Portuguesa de Futebol Profissional (LPFP) for teams competing in the top two tiers of Portuguese football – the Primeira Liga and Liga Portugal 2. Unlike Portugal's other domestic cup competition, the Taça de Portugal, the winners of the Taça da Liga do not qualify for European competitions.

The Taça da Liga was established in the 2007–08 season, thus becoming the third official competition for professional clubs in Portugal, after a proposal by Sporting CP and Boavista was approved by LPFP members on 28 November 2006. For sponsorship reasons, it is currently known as Allianz Cup (with the English word cup).

Benfica are the most successful team in the competition, having won eight trophies (four of which consecutively between 2009 and 2012). Vitória de Guimarães are the current holders after defeating their Minho rivals Braga 2–1 in the 2026 final to win their first title in the competition.

== Format ==
The Taça da Liga format has had changes throughout the competition's history in order to increase the number of matches and also revenue for both clubs and LPFP. Starting in the 2021–22 season, the format is the following:

- First round – One-legged ties between all Segunda Liga teams (except reserve or B teams), the ten Primeira Liga teams ranked 7th–16th in the previous season, and the two teams promoted from the Segunda Liga, with the winner advancing to the next round.
- Second round – One-legged ties between the first-round winners and the two Primeira Liga teams ranked 5th and 6th in the previous season. The winners advance to the next round.
- Third round – Four groups of three teams played in a single round-robin format, each containing two second-round winners and one of the four top-placed Primeira Liga season teams of the previous season. The group winners advance to the next round.
- Knockout phase – Semi-finals and final played as one-legged fixtures played at a neutral ground.

For 2022–23, due to fixture congestion surrounding the 2022 FIFA World Cup, all Segunda Liga and Primeira Liga teams (except reserve or B teams) were placed into 8 groups (6 groups of 4 teams and 2 groups of 5 teams), with the group winners advancing to the knockout phase, consisting of quarter-finals, semi-finals and the final. All knockout stage games are one-legged fixtures, with the semi-finals and finals still played at a neutral ground. All group stage games and the quarter-finals were played during the international break surrounding the World Cup.

== Finals ==
Season	Winners	Score	Runners-up	Date	Venue
2007–08	Vitória de Setúbal	0–0 (3–2 p)	Sporting CP	22 March 2008	Estádio Algarve, Faro/Loulé
2008–09	Benfica	1–1 (3–2 p)	Sporting CP	21 March 2009	Estádio Algarve, Faro/Loulé
2009–10	Benfica (2)	3–0	Porto	21 March 2010	Estádio Algarve, Faro/Loulé
2010–11	Benfica (3)	2–1	Paços de Ferreira	23 April 2011	Estádio Cidade de Coimbra, Coimbra
2011–12	Benfica (4)	2–1	Gil Vicente	14 April 2012	Estádio Cidade de Coimbra, Coimbra
2012–13	Braga	1–0	Porto	13 April 2013	Estádio Cidade de Coimbra, Coimbra
2013–14	Benfica (5)	2–0	Rio Ave	7 May 2014	Estádio Dr. Magalhães Pessoa, Leiria
2014–15	Benfica (6)	2–1	Marítimo	29 May 2015	Estádio Cidade de Coimbra, Coimbra
2015–16	Benfica (7)	6–2	Marítimo	20 May 2016	Estádio Cidade de Coimbra, Coimbra
2016–17	Moreirense	1–0	Braga	29 January 2017	Estádio Algarve, Faro/Loulé
2017–18	Sporting CP	1–1 (5–4 p)	Vitória de Setúbal	27 January 2018	Estádio Municipal de Braga, Braga
2018–19	Sporting CP (2)	1–1 (3–1 p)	Porto	26 January 2019	Estádio Municipal de Braga, Braga
2019–20	Braga (2)	1–0	Porto	25 January 2020	Estádio Municipal de Braga, Braga
2020–21	Sporting CP (3)	1–0	Braga	23 January 2021	Estádio Dr. Magalhães Pessoa, Leiria
2021–22	Sporting CP (4)	2–1	Benfica	29 January 2022	Estádio Dr. Magalhães Pessoa, Leiria
2022–23	Porto	2–0	Sporting CP	28 January 2023	Estádio Dr. Magalhães Pessoa, Leiria
2023–24	Braga (3)	1–1 (5–4 p)	Estoril	27 January 2024	Estádio Dr. Magalhães Pessoa, Leiria
2024–25	Benfica (8)	1–1 (7–6 p)	Sporting CP	11 January 2025	Estádio Dr. Magalhães Pessoa, Leiria
2025–26	Vitória de Guimarães	2–1	Braga	10 January 2026	Estádio Dr. Magalhães Pessoa, Leiria

=== Performance by club ===
Club	Winners	Runners-up	Winning years	Runner-up years
Benfica	8	1	2009, 2010, 2011, 2012, 2014, 2015, 2016, 2025	2022
Sporting CP	4	4	2018, 2019, 2021, 2022	2008, 2009, 2023, 2025
Braga	3	3	2013, 2020, 2024	2017, 2021, 2026
Porto	1	4	2023	2010, 2013, 2019, 2020
Vitória de Setúbal	1	1	2008	2018
Moreirense	1	0	2017	—
Vitória de Guimarães	1	0	2026	—
Marítimo	0	2	—	2015, 2016
Paços de Ferreira	0	1	—	2011
Gil Vicente	0	1	—	2012
Rio Ave	0	1	—	2014
Estoril	0	1	—	2024

== Participating clubs ==
	Team	City	Years	First season	Last season	Titles	Runners-up
1	Benfica	Lisbon	20	2008	2027	8	1
2	Sporting CP	Lisbon	20	2008	2027	4	4
3	Braga	Braga	20	2008	2027	3	3
4	Porto	Porto	20	2008	2027	1	4
5	Vitória de Setúbal	Setúbal	13	2008	2020	1	1
6	Vitória de Guimarães	Guimarães	19	2008	2026	1	0
7	Moreirense	Guimarães	14	2011	2025	1	0
8	Marítimo	Funchal	17	2008	2027	0	2
9	Estoril	Estoril	17	2008	2024	0	1
10	Paços de Ferreira	Paços de Ferreira	17	2008	2024	0	1
11	Rio Ave	Vila do Conde	16	2008	2024	0	1
12	Gil Vicente	Barcelos	16	2008	2027	0	1
13	Santa Clara	Ponta Delgada	18	2008	2026	0	0
14	Nacional	Funchal	17	2008	2025	0	0
15	Feirense	Santa Maria da Feira	16	2008	2024	0	0
15	Leixões	Matosinhos	16	2008	2024	0	0
15	Portimonense	Portimão	16	2008	2024	0	0
18	Penafiel	Penafiel	15	2008	2024	0	0
19	Académica	Coimbra	14	2008	2022	0	0
19	Sporting da Covilhã	Covilhã	14	2009	2023	0	0
21	Desportivo das Aves	Vila das Aves	13	2008	2020	0	0
21	Oliveirense	Oliveira de Azeméis	13	2009	2024	0	0
23	Belenenses	Lisbon	12	2008	2024	0	0
23	Arouca	Arouca	12	2011	2024	0	0
23	Tondela	Tondela	12	2013	2026	0	0
26	Chaves	Chaves	11	2010	2024	0	0
26	Académico de Viseu	Viseu	11	2014	2027	0	0
28	Olhanense	Olhão	10	2008	2017	0	0
28	Varzim	Póvoa de Varzim	10	2008	2022	0	0
28	Trofense	Trofa	10	2008	2023	0	0
28	Boavista	Porto	10	2008	2024	0	0
32	Famalicão	Vila Nova de Famalicão	9	2016	2027	0	0
33	Beira-Mar	Aveiro	8	2008	2015	0	0
33	Freamunde	Freamunde	8	2008	2017	0	0
33	Farense	Faro	8	2014	2024	0	0
36	União da Madeira	Funchal	7	2012	2018	0	0
36	Mafra	Mafra	7	2016	2024	0	0
38	Naval	Figueira da Foz	6	2008	2013	0	0
38	União de Leiria	Leiria	6	2008	2024	0	0
38	Vizela	Vizela	6	2008	2024	0	0
41	Atlético CP	Lisbon	5	2012	2016	0	0
41	Estrela da Amadora	Amadora	5	2008	2024	0	0
43	Cova da Piedade	Cova da Piedade	4	2017	2020	0	0
43	B-SAD	Lisbon	4	2019	2023	0	0
43	Casa Pia	Lisbon	4	2020	2024	0	0
46	Fátima	Fátima	3	2008	2011	0	0
46	Vilafranquense	Vila Franca de Xira	3	2020	2023	0	0
48	Gondomar	Gondomar	2	2008	2009	0	0
48	Oriental	Lisbon	2	2015	2016	0	0
48	Torreense	Torres Vedras	2	2023	2024	0	0
51	Carregado	Carregado	1	2010	2010	0	0
51	Fafe	Fafe	1	2017	2017	0	0
51	Real	Queluz	1	2018	2018	0	0
51	AVS	Vila das Aves	1	2024	2024	0	0
51	Vilaverdense	Vila Verde	1	2024	2024	0	0
51	Alverca	Alverca	1	2026	2026	0	0

== Players statistics ==
=== Appearances ===
As of 2024–25 season

Rank	Nat.	Player	Apps	Goals	Years	Clubs
1	(Brazil)	Jardel	43	1	2009–2021	Estoril, Olhanense, Benfica
2	(Portugal)	Tarantini	41	5	2007–2021	Portimonense, Rio Ave
3	(Portugal)	**Ricardo Esgaio**	39	0	2012–2025	Sporting CP, Académica, Braga
4	(Portugal)	Gilberto Silva	38	3	2007–2023	Boavista, Covilhã
5	(Portugal)	Ukra	37	3	2007–2023	Varzim, Olhanense, FC Porto, Braga, Rio Ave, Santa Clara
5	(Portugal)	Pizzi	37	9	2009–2024	Covilhã, Paços Ferreira, Benfica, Braga
5	(Portugal)	Paulinho	37	21	2012–2024	Trofense, Gil Vicente, Braga, Sporting CP
8	(Portugal)	Filipe Gonçalves	36	3	2007–2020	Vitória Setúbal, Paços Ferreira, Trofense, Moreirense, Estoril, Oliveirense
9	(Portugal)	Ricardo Pessoa	35	7	2007–2018	Portimonense, Moreirense
9	(Portugal)	João Pedro	35	4	2007–2022	Beira-Mar, União de Leiria, Oliveirense, Naval, Braga Belenenses, Moreirense, Académica

Bold = Still active and playing in Portugal

=== Goalscorers ===
==== All-time top scorers ====
As of 2024–25 season

Rank	Nat.	Player	Goals	Games	Years	Clubs
1	(Portugal)	Paulinho	21	37	2012–2024	Trofense, Gil Vicente, Braga, Sporting CP
2	(Portugal)	Tozé Marreco	12	25	2010–	Desportivo das Aves, União da Madeira, Naval, Tondela, Académica
3	(Portugal)	Liédson	11	13	2007–2013	Sporting CP, Porto
4	(Brazil)	Jonas	10	15	2014–2019	Benfica
5	(Portugal)	Hélder Guedes	9	34	2007–2018	Penafiel, Paços de Ferreira, Rio Ave, Vitória Setúbal
5	(Brazil)	Lima	9	16	2009–2015	Belenenses, Braga, Benfica
5	(Portugal)	Rabiola	9	16	2007–2015	Porto, Desportivo das Aves, Penafiel
5	(Portugal)	Dyego Sousa	9	21	2010–2019	Leixões, Tondela, Portimonense Marítimo, Braga
5	(Portugal)	Edinho	9	22	2007–2020	Marítimo, Académica, Braga, Vitória de Setúbal, Feirense
5	(Portugal)	Miguel Rosa	9	25	2008–2022	Estoril, Carregado, Belenenses, Cova da Piedade, Estrela da Amadora
5	(Portugal)	Clemente	9	27	2007–2019	Chaves, Oliveirense, Santa Clara
5	(Portugal)	Pizzi	9	37	2009–2024	Covilhã, Paços Ferreira, Benfica, Braga

Bold = Still active and playing in Portugal

==== Goalscorers by seasons ====
Season	Player	Country	Club	Goals
2007–08	Matheus	Brazil	Vitória de Setúbal	5
2008–09	Liédson	Brazil	Sporting CP	4
2009–10	Carlão	Brazil	União de Leiria	3
2010–11	Hugo Vieira	Portugal	Gil Vicente	5
2011–12	Baba Diawara	Senegal	Marítimo	4
2011–12	Rodrigo	Spain	Benfica	4
2011–12	Miguel Rosa	Portugal	Belenenses	4
2012–13	Fabrício	Brazil	Sporting da Covilhã	5
2012–13	Josué	Portugal	Paços de Ferreira	5
2012–13	Rafael Porcellis	Brazil	Santa Clara	5
2012–13	Rabiola	Portugal	Desportivo das Aves	5
2013–14	Tozé Marreco	Portugal	Tondela	3
2013–14	Jackson Martínez	Colombia	Porto	3
2013–14	Moreira	Portugal	Leixões	3
2013–14	Ricardo Pessoa	Portugal	Portimonense	3
2013–14	Wágner	Brazil	Moreirense	3
2014–15	Jonas	Brazil	Benfica	5
2015–16	André Carvalhas	Portugal	Portimonense	4
2015–16	Raúl Jiménez	Mexico	Benfica	4
2015–16	Talisca	Brazil	Benfica	4
2016–17	Welthon	Brazil	Paços de Ferreira	4
2017–18	Gonçalo Paciência	Portugal	Vitória de Setúbal	5
2018–19	Paulinho	Portugal	Braga	4
2018–19	Dyego Sousa	Portugal	Braga	4
2019–20	Ricardo Horta	Portugal	Braga	4
2019–20	Soares	Brazil	Porto	4
2020–21	Paulinho	Portugal	Braga	3
2021–22	Gustavo Sauer	Brazil	Boavista	4
2022–23	Paulinho	Portugal	Sporting CP	8
2023–24	Clayton	Brazil	Casa Pia	4
2024–25	Viktor Gyökeres	Sweden	Sporting CP	4
2025–26	Alioune Ndoye	Senegal	Vitória SC	3

== Sponsorship ==
Since its inception (except in the period between 2011 and 2015) the Taça da Liga has had the following naming sponsors meaning it has been known by different names:

Period	Sponsor	Name
2007–2010	Carlsberg	Carlsberg Cup
2010–2011	Bwin	Bwin Cup
2011–2015	No main sponsor	Taça da Liga
2015–2018	CTT	Taça CTT
2018–	Allianz	Allianz Cup

== Records ==
As of 11 January 2025

- Most tournament wins (team): 8 wins, Benfica
- Most final appearances (team): 9, Benfica
- Most tournament wins (player): 7, Luisão for Benfica;
- Most final appearances: (individual): 6, Luisão for Benfica (2009–11, 2014–16)
- Most matches (team): 72, Sporting
- Most matches (individual): 43, Jardel
- Most game wins (team): 46, Benfica
- Most goals (team): 143, Benfica
- Highest goalscorer (career): 21 goals, Paulinho
- Highest goalscorer (season): 5 goals, by Matheus for Vitória de Setúbal (2007–08), Hugo Vieira for Gil Vicente (2010–11) and Jonas for Benfica (2014–15)
- Most goals scored in a match (individual): 4 goals, by Rabiola for Desportivo das Aves vs Trofense, 29 July 2012
- Biggest win: Sporting CP 6–0 União da Madeira, third round, 20 December 2017
- Biggest win in a final: Marítimo 2–6 Benfica, 20 May 2016
- Highest scoring game: 8 goals, Belenenses 5–3 Leixões, first round, 7 August 2011 and Marítimo 2–6 Benfica, final, 20 May 2016
- Most penalties in a deciding penalty shoot-out: 20 – Vitória de Guimarães 6–7 Sporting CP (27 September 2007)
- Youngest goalscorer in the final: Bruno Pereirinha, 20 years and 19 days, for Sporting CP vs Benfica, 2009
- Youngest player in the final: Geovany Quenda, 17 years, 8 months and 13 days for Sporting CP vs Benfica, 2025
- Youngest captain in the final: João Moutinho, 21 years, 6 months and 14 days for Sporting CP vs Vitória de Setúbal, 2008

== See also ==
- Taça de Portugal
- Taça Ribeiro dos Reis (unofficial predecessor organized by the Portuguese Football Federation)
- Taça Federação Portuguesa de Futebol (another predecessor organized by the Portuguese Football Federation)
- List of association football competitions in Portugal
- List of Taça da Liga winning managers
