= 2024–25 C.F. Estrela da Amadora season =

C.F. Estrela da Amadora
2024–25 season
- Head coach: Filipe Martins (until 24 September); José Faria (from 26 September)
- Stadium: Estádio José Gomes
- Primeira Liga: 14th
- Taça de Portugal: Pre-season
- Average home league attendance: 3,704

The 2024–25 season is the fifth season in the history of Club Football Estrela da Amadora, and the club's second consecutive season in Primeira Liga. In addition to the domestic league, the team will participate in the Taça de Portugal.

== Transfers ==
=== In ===
Pos.	Player	Transferred from	Fee	Date	Source
MF	(Brazil) Daniel Cabral	(Brazil) Flamengo B	Undisclosed	23 July 2024	
MF	(Portugal) Nani	Unattached	Free	31 July 2024	
MF	(Singapore) Nur Muhammad Asis	(Singapore) Lion City Sailors	Loan	31 July 2024	
FW	(Egypt) Bilal Mazhar	(Greece) Panathinaikos B	Free	31 August 2024	

=== Out ===
Pos.	Player	Transferred to	Fee	Date	Source
MF	(Portugal) Nani		Retired	8 December 2024	
FW	(Egypt) Bilal Mazhar	(Greece) Lamia	Free	3 January 2025	

== Friendlies ==
=== Pre-season ===
13 July 2024 Friendly	Estrela da Amadora (Portugal)	3–0	(Portugal) Sporting CP B
13:00 UTC+1

20 July 2024 Friendly	Paços de Ferreira (Portugal)	4–3	(Portugal) Estrela da Amadora
10:30 UTC+1

24 July 2024 Friendly	Estrela da Amadora (Portugal)	2–1	(Portugal) Estoril
10:30 UTC+1	Rodrigo Pinho; Kikas		Wagner Pina

30 July 2024 Friendly	Estrela da Amadora (Portugal)	3–1	(England) Brentford
11:00 UTC+1

2 August 2024 Friendly	Santarém (Portugal)	2–1	(Portugal) Estrela da Amadora
19:15 UTC+1

3 August 2024 Friendly	Benfica B (Portugal)	0–2	(Portugal) Estrela da Amadora
18:00 UTC+1

== Competitions ==
=== Overall record ===
Competition	First match	Last match	Starting round	Record							
Competition	First match	Last match	Starting round	Pld	W	D	L	GF	GA	GD	Win %
Primeira Liga	11 August 2024	May 2025	Matchday 1	4	0	1	3	1	6	−5	0.00
Taça de Portugal				0	0	0	0	0	0	+0	—
Total				4	0	1	3	1	6	−5	0.00

Last updated: 31 August 2024
Source: Soccerway

=== Primeira Liga ===
==== League table ====
Pos	Team	Pld	W	D	L	GF	GA	GD	Pts	Qualification or relegation
13	Gil Vicente	34	8	10	16	34	47	−13	34	
14	Nacional	34	9	7	18	32	50	−18	34	
15	Estrela da Amadora	34	7	8	19	24	50	−26	29	
16	AVS (O)	34	5	12	17	25	60	−35	27 (Note: Head to head points: AVS 4, Farense 1.)	Qualification for the relegation play-offs
17	Farense (R)	34	6	9	19	25	46	−21	27	Relegation to Liga Portugal 2

Source: Liga Portugal
Rules for classification: 1) Points; 2) Head-to-head points; 3) Head-to-head goal difference; 4) Goal difference; 5) Matches won; 6) Goals scored; 7) Play-off.
(O) Play-off winners; (R) Relegated

==== Matches ====
The match schedule was released on 7 July 2024.

11 August 2024 1	Braga	1-1	Estrela da Amadora	Braga
20:30	El Ouazzani 53'; Moutinho (yellow card) 67'; Zalazar (yellow card) 86'; Marques (yellow card) 87'	Report	Keliano (yellow card) 45'; Kikas 80'; Nani (yellow card) 86'; Ruiz (yellow card) 90'; Bucca (yellow card) 90'; Lopes (yellow card) 90+7'	Stadium: Estádio Municipal de Braga; Attendance: 14.746; Referee: Ricardo Baixinho

19 August 2024 2	Estrela da Amadora	0-3	Famalicão	Amadora
20:15	Keliano (yellow card) 26'; Kikas (yellow card) 64'; Veiga (yellow card) 80'	Report	Sorrizo 36'; A. Evangelista (yellow card) 56'; Zlobin (yellow card) 66'; Yussouf 83'; González 90+3'	Stadium: Estádio José Gomes; Attendance: 4.769; Referee: Bruno Vieira

24 August 2024 3	Benfica	1–0	Estrela da Amadora	Lisbon
20:30	Kökçü 19' (yellow card) 34'; Carreras (yellow card) 36'; Gouveia (yellow card) 59'; Sanches (yellow card) 90+6'	Report	André Luiz (yellow card) 36'; Santana (yellow card) 72'; Cordeiro (yellow card) 87'	Stadium: Estádio da Luz; Attendance: 59,490; Referee: Hélder Malheiro (Lisbon)

31 August 2024 4	Estrela da Amadora	0–1	Casa Pia	Amadora
18:00	Lopes (yellow card) 90+2'	Report	Tchamba (yellow card) 49'; Pereira 61'; Marco Santos (red card) 71'	Stadium: Estádio José Gomes; Attendance: 3.471; Referee: Hélder Carvalho

16 September 2024 5	Estrela da Amadora	2-2	Boavista	Amadora
20:15	Nani 34', (yellow card) 45+2'; Keliano (yellow card) 36'; Ruiz (yellow card) 45+2'	Report	Onyemaechi 23', (yellow card) 85'; Gomes (yellow card) 34'; Vukotić 45+5'; Ibrahima (yellow card) 48'; Sousa (yellow card) 56'; Pedro Prata (red card) 80'	Stadium: Estádio José Gomes; Attendance: 3.476; Referee: Tiago Martins

21 September 2024 6	Santa Clara	1-0	Estrela da Amadora	Ponta Delgada
15:30	MT (yellow card) 16'; Lima (yellow card) 51'; Lopes 81'	Report	Ruiz (yellow card) 45'; Veiga (yellow card) 64'; Jesus (yellow card) 79'	Stadium: Estádio de São Miguel; Attendance: 2.123; Referee: João Gonçalves

28 September 2024 7	Estrela da Amadora	2-1	Moreirense	Amadora
15:30	Bucca 2', (yellow card) 46'; Kikas 20'; Cissokho (yellow card) 57'; Nilton (yellow card) 57'; F. Marques (red card) 75'; C. Boaventura (red card) 90+12'	Report	Fabiano (yellow card) 69'; Asué (yellow card) 73'; Ismael 82'; Santos (yellow card) 86'; C. Peixoto (red card) 90+5'; S. Teixeira (red card) 90+5'	Stadium: Estádio José Gomes; Attendance: 2.987; Referee: Miguel Fonseca

5 October 2024 8	Gil Vicente	3-0	Estrela da Amadora	Barcelos
15:30	Correia 9'; Fujimoto 33'; García (yellow card) 56'; Aguirre 82', (yellow card) 90+3'	Report	Jesus (yellow card) 52'	Stadium: Estádio Cidade de Barcelos; Attendance: 2.709; Referee: Iancu Vasilica

27 October 2024 9	Estrela da Amadora	2-2	Vitória Guimarães	Amadora
20:30	Bucca 45+1'; Ferro (yellow card) 50'; Nani (yellow card) 66'; D. Delgado (yellow card) 67'; Pinho 84' (pen.)	Report	Händel (yellow card) 32'; Santos 43'; Silva 69' (pen.); Mendes (yellow card) 75'; Manu (yellow card) 82'	Stadium: Estádio José Gomes; Attendance: 2.319; Referee: António Nobre

1 November 2024 10	Sporting CP	5-1	Estrela da Amadora	Lisbon
20:15	Gyökeres 19', 31', 42' (pen.), 70'; Araújo 85'	Report	Moreira (yellow card) 4'; Pinho 35'; Bucca (yellow card) 41'; Cordeiro (yellow card) 44'; Ferro (yellow card) 79'	Stadium: Estádio José Alvalade; Attendance: 41,282; Referee: Bruno Vieira

10 November 2024 11	Estrela da Amadora	2-0	Nacional	Amadora
15:30	Cabral 57'; Ferro (yellow card) 62'; Moreira 77'; Kikas 86'	Report	Esteves (yellow card) 12'; França 57'	Stadium: Estádio José Gomes; Attendance: 3.386; Referee: Bruno José Costa

29 November 2024 12	Farense	1-0	Estrela Amadora	Faro
20.15 WET (UTC±0)	Poveda 23'; Áfrico (yellow card) 63'; Merghem (yellow card) 74'; Menino (yellow card) 81'; Bermejo (yellow card) 84'	Report	Ruiz (yellow card) 19'; Jesus (yellow card) 28'	Stadium: Estádio de São Luís; Attendance: 5.178; Referee: João Pinheiro

9 December 2024 13	Estrela da Amadora	2–1	Arouca	Amadora
20:15 WEST (UTC+01:00)	Moreira (yellow card) 37'; Veiga (yellow card) 45+4'; Esgaio 58' (o.g.); Kikas (yellow card) 65'; Pinho 68'; Keliano (yellow card) 90+1'	Report	Jason 4', (yellow card) 81'; Dante (yellow card) 6'	Stadium: Estádio José Gomes; Attendance: 2.083; Referee: Fábio Veríssimo

16 December 2024 14	Porto	2–0	Estrela da Amadora	Porto
20:15 WET (UTC±00:00)	González 12'; Borges 90+3'	Report	Veiga (yellow card) 33' (yellow-red card) 74'; Lima (yellow card) 76'; J. Faria (red card) 75'	Stadium: Estádio do Dragão; Attendance: 32.116; Referee: Miguel Nogueira

23 December 2024 15	Estrela da Amadora	1-0	Rio Ave	Amadora
20:45	Gabriel 36'; Travassos (yellow card) 58'; Jesus (yellow card) 81'; Cabral (yellow card) 90+2'; Bucca (yellow card) 90+9'	Report	Novais (yellow card) 52'; Morais (yellow card) 81'; Aguilera (yellow card) 90+8'; Petit (red card) 90+8'	Stadium: Estádio José Gomes; Attendance: - Referee: Iancu Vasilica

28 December 2024 16	AVS	1-1	Estrela da Amadora	Santo Tirso
15:30	Devenish (yellow card) 34'; Roux 51'; Mercado (yellow card) 87'	Report	Léo Cordeiro 8'; Alan Ruiz (yellow card) 34'; Nilton Varela (yellow card) 47'	Stadium: Estádio do Clube Desportivo das Aves; Attendance: 1,262; Referee: (Portugal) Pedro Ramalho

5 January 2025 17	Estrela da Amadora	2-4	Estoril	Amadora
20:30	Tiago Gabriel (yellow card) 47'; Rodrigo Pinho (yellow card) 55'; André Luiz 57'; Rodrigo Pinho 70'; Luís Silva (red card) 75'	Report	Xeka 15'; Begraoui 25'; Tiago Gabriel 31' (o.g.); Marqués 77' (yellow card) 83'	Stadium: Estádio José Gomes; Attendance: 1,756; Referee: (Portugal) Anzhony Rodrigues

19 January 2025 18	Estrela da Amadora	0-1	Braga	Amadora
18:00	Bucca (yellow card) 84'; Nilton Varela (yellow card) 86'; Manu (yellow card) 90+2'	Report	Martínez (yellow card) 78'; El Ouazzani 90+4'	Stadium: Estádio José Gomes; Attendance: 2,719; Referee: (Portugal) Iancu Vasilica

25 January 2025 19	Famalicão	0-0	Estrela da Amadora	Vila Nova de Famalicão
15:30	Rodrigo Pinheiro (yellow card) 63'	Report	Tiago Gabriel (yellow card) 61'; Travassos (yellow card) 71'; Gudžulić (yellow card) 75'	Stadium: Estádio Municipal 22 de Junho; Attendance: 2,716; Referee: (Portugal) Claúdio Pereira

2 February 2025	Estrela da Amadora	-	Benfica	Amadora
20:30				Stadium: Estádio José Gomes

9 February 2025	Casa Pia	-	Estrela da Amadora	Rio Maior
20:30				Stadium: Estádio Municipal de Rio Maior

14 February 2025	Boavista	-	Estrela da Amadora	Porto
20:15				Stadium: Estádio do Bessa

23 February 2025	Estrela da Amadora	-	Santa Clara	Amadora
15:30				Stadium: Estádio José Gomes

=== Taça de Portugal ===
19 October 2024 Third round	Anadia	1–3 (a.e.t.)	Estrela da Amadora	Anadia
18:00 WEST (UTC+01:00)	Sinisterra (yellow card) 2'; Maranhão 24' (pen.); Carvalho (yellow card) 40'; Santos (yellow card) 69'; Hassan (yellow card) 89'; Casagrande (yellow card) 90+5'; Zimbabwe (yellow card) 106'; Nuca (yellow card) 117'	Report	Travassos (yellow card) 11'; Lima (yellow card) 39'; Nilton (yellow card) 63'; Gaio 90+1' (o.g.); Kikas (yellow card) 90+2'; Veiga (yellow card) 90+5'; Pinho 94'; Meixedo (yellow card) 98'; Luiz 107'	Stadium: Estádio Municipal Eng.º Sílvio Henriques Cerveira; Attendance: - Referee: Gonçalo Neves

23 November 2024 Fourth round	Benfica	7–0	Estrela da Amadora	Lisbon
20:45 WET (UTC±0)	Di María 2', 5', 18'; Aktürkoğlu 59'; Rollheiser (yellow card) 74'; Amdouni 81'; Cabral 86', 90'	Report	Montoia (yellow card) 41'; Travassos (yellow card) 63'	Stadium: Estádio da Luz; Attendance: 56,094; Referee: André Narciso (Setúbal)
