= 2024–25 S.C. Braga season =

S.C. Braga
2024–25 season
- President: António Salvador
- Head coach: Daniel Sousa (until 11 August); Carlos Carvalhal (from 12 August)
- Stadium: Estádio Municipal de Braga
- Primeira Liga: 4th
- Taça de Portugal: Quarter-finals
- Taça da Liga: Semi-finals
- UEFA Europa League: League phase
- Top goalscorer: League: Ricardo Horta (10); All: Ricardo Horta (14)
- Highest home attendance: 21,215 (v. Vitória Guimarães, 15 September 2024)
- Average home league attendance: 13,868
| Home colours | Away colours | Third colours |

The 2024–25 season was the 104th season in the history of Sporting Clube de Braga, and the club's 32nd consecutive season in the top flight of Portuguese football. In addition to the domestic league, the club participated in the Taça de Portugal, Taça da Liga and UEFA Europa League.

== Squad ==
As of 1 August 2024

Note: Flags indicate national team as defined under FIFA eligibility rules; some limited exceptions apply. Players may hold more than one non-FIFA nationality.

| No. | Pos. | Nation | Player |
|---|---|---|---|
| 1 | GK | BRA | Matheus |
| 2 | DF | ESP | Víctor Gómez |
| 3 | DF | BRA | Robson Bambu |
| 4 | DF | MLI | Sikou Niakaté |
| 5 | DF | TUR | Serdar Saatçı |
| 6 | MF | BRA | Vitor Carvalho |
| 7 | FW | POR | Bruma |
| 8 | MF | POR | João Moutinho |
| 9 | FW | MAR | Amine El Ouazzani |
| 10 | MF | POR | André Horta |
| 11 | FW | GBS | Roger Fernandes |
| 12 | GK | POR | Tiago Sá |
| 15 | DF | POR | Paulo Oliveira |
| 16 | MF | URU | Rodrigo Zalazar |

| No. | Pos. | Nation | Player |
|---|---|---|---|
| 17 | DF | SWE | Joe Mendes |
| 19 | DF | ESP | Adrián Marín |
| 20 | FW | POR | Rony Lopes |
| 21 | FW | POR | Ricardo Horta (captain) |
| 22 | MF | URU | Thiago Helguera |
| 23 | FW | COD | Simon Banza |
| 26 | DF | GER | Bright Arrey-Mbi |
| 27 | DF | POL | Bartłomiej Wdowik |
| 29 | MF | FRA | Jean-Baptiste Gorby |
| 31 | GK | BRA | Bernardo Fontes |
| 33 | FW | POR | João Marques |
| 77 | FW | ESP | Gabri Martínez |
| 90 | FW | ESP | Roberto Fernández |
| 91 | GK | CZE | Lukáš Horníček |

== Transfers ==
=== In ===
| Pos. | Player | Transferred from | Fee | Date | Source |
|---|---|---|---|---|---|
| FW | (Morocco) Amine El Ouazzani | (France) Guingamp | €3,500,000 | 1 July 2024 | |
| DF | (Brazil) Robson Bambu | (France) OGC Nice | €1,200,000 | 1 July 2024 | |
| MF | (Portugal) João Marques | (Portugal) Estoril | €3,500,000 | 1 July 2024 | |
| MF | (Uruguay) Thiago Helguera | (Uruguay) Nacional | €3,800,000 | 1 July 2024 | |
| DF | (Poland) Bartłomiej Wdowik | (Poland) Jagiellonia Białystok | €1,500,000 | 1 July 2024 | |
| FW | (Spain) Fran Navarro | (Portugal) Porto | Loan | 1 January 2025 | |

=== Out ===
| Pos. | Player | Transferred to | Fee | Date | Source |
|---|---|---|---|---|---|
| MF | (Spain) Álvaro Djaló | (Spain) Athletic Bilbao | €15,000,000 | 1 July 2024 | |
| DF | (Libya) Al-Musrati | (Turkey) Beşiktaş | €11,000,000 | 1 July 2024 | |
| FW | (Spain) Abel Ruiz | (Spain) Girona | €8,500,000 | 1 July 2024 | |
| DF | (Poland) Bartłomiej Wdowik | (Germany) Hannover 96 | Loan | 30 August 2024 | |

== Friendlies ==
=== Pre-season ===
| 30 June 2024 Friendly | Sion | 1–3 | Braga | Thonon-les-Bains, France |
| 17:00 | Berdayes 26' | Report | Banza 13'; El Ouazzani 80'; Bambu 115' | Stadium: Stade Joseph-Moynat |
Note: 4 x 30 minutes

| 5 July 2024 Friendly | Stade Lausanne Ouchy | 0–1 | Braga | Évian-Les-Bains, France |
| 10:30 | | Report | Banza 30' | Stadium: Stade Camille Fournier; Attendance: 0 |

| 5 July 2024 Friendly | Lausanne-Sport | 1–3 | Braga | Divonne-Les-Bains, France |
| 17:00 | Kaly Sène 2' | | Gómez 45'; Gorby 79'; El Ouazzani 86' | Stadium: Stade Honneur |

| 10 July 2024 Friendly | Braga | 0–2 | Moreirense |
| 10:00 UTC+1 |

| 14 July 2024 Friendly | Braga | 2–1 | Anderlecht | Vila Nova de Famalicão, Portugal |
| 11:00 UTC+1 | Stroeykens 46' (o.g.); Martínez 78' | | Amuzu 63' | Stadium: Estádio Municipal 22 de Junho |

| 18 July 2024 Friendly | Braga | 2–2 | Rayo Vallecano |
| 20:15 UTC+1 |

== Competitions ==
=== Overall record ===
| Competition | First match | Last match | Starting round | Final position | Record | | | | | | | |
| Competition | First match | Last match | Starting round | Final position | Pld | W | D | L | GF | GA | GD | Win % |
|---|---|---|---|---|---|---|---|---|---|---|---|---|
| Primeira Liga | 11 August 2024 | 16 May 2025 | Matchday 1 | 4th | 34 | 19 | 9 | 6 | 55 | 30 | +25 | 55.88 |
| Taça de Portugal | 19 October 2024 | 26 February 2025 | Third round | Quarter-finals | 4 | 3 | 0 | 1 | 6 | 3 | +3 | 75.00 |
| Taça da Liga | 31 October 2024 | 8 January 2025 | Quarter-finals | Semi-finals | 2 | 1 | 0 | 1 | 2 | 4 | −2 | 50.00 |
| UEFA Europa League | 25 July 2024 | 30 January 2025 | Second qualifying round | League phase | 14 | 7 | 3 | 4 | 22 | 16 | +6 | 50.00 |
| Total | | | | | 54 | 30 | 12 | 12 | 85 | 53 | +32 | 55.56 |

Source: Soccerway

=== Primeira Liga ===
==== League table ====
| Pos | Team | Pld | W | D | L | GF | GA | GD | Pts | Qualification or relegation |
|---|---|---|---|---|---|---|---|---|---|---|
| 2 | Benfica | 34 | 25 | 5 | 4 | 84 | 28 | +56 | 80 | Qualification for the Champions League third qualifying round |
| 3 | Porto | 34 | 22 | 5 | 7 | 65 | 30 | +35 | 71 | Qualification for the Europa League league phase (Note: The 2024–25 Taça de Portugal winners (Sporting) finished in the top two, thus the third place team got the league stage berth.) |
| 4 | Braga | 34 | 19 | 9 | 6 | 55 | 30 | +25 | 66 | Qualification for the Europa League second qualifying round |
| 5 | Santa Clara | 34 | 17 | 6 | 11 | 36 | 32 | +4 | 57 | Qualification for the Conference League second qualifying round |
| 6 | Vitória de Guimarães | 34 | 14 | 12 | 8 | 47 | 37 | +10 | 54 | |

Source: Liga Portugal
Rules for classification: 1) Points; 2) Head-to-head points; 3) Head-to-head goal difference; 4) Goal difference; 5) Matches won; 6) Goals scored; 7) Play-off.

==== Results summary ====
| Overall | | | | | | | | Home | | | | | | Away | | | | | |
| Pld | W | D | L | GF | GA | GD | Pts | W | D | L | GF | GA | GD | W | D | L | GF | GA | GD |
|---|---|---|---|---|---|---|---|---|---|---|---|---|---|---|---|---|---|---|---|
| 34 | 19 | 9 | 6 | 55 | 30 | +25 | 66 | 9 | 5 | 3 | 33 | 19 | +14 | 10 | 4 | 3 | 22 | 11 | +11 |

Source: Liga Portugal

| Round | 1 | 2 | 3 | 4 | 5 | 6 | 7 | 8 | 9 | 10 | 11 | 12 | 13 | 14 | 15 | 16 | 17 | 18 | 19 | 20 | 21 | 22 | 23 | 24 | 25 | 26 | 27 | 28 | 29 | 30 | 31 | 32 | 33 | 34 |
|---|---|---|---|---|---|---|---|---|---|---|---|---|---|---|---|---|---|---|---|---|---|---|---|---|---|---|---|---|---|---|---|---|---|---|
| Ground | H | A | H | A | H | A | H | A | H | A | H | A | H | H | A | H | A | A | H | A | H | A | H | A | H | A | H | A | H | A | A | H | A | H |
| Result | D | W | W | D | L | W | W | L | W | W | L | W | D | D | W | L | W | W | W | W | W | D | W | L | W | W | W | D | W | W | D | D | L | D |
| Position | 9 | 6 | 4 | 6 | 7 | 7 | 5 | 5 | 5 | 4 | 5 | 5 | 5 | 5 | 4 | 5 | 4 | 4 | 4 | 4 | 4 | 4 | 4 | 4 | 4 | 4 | 4 | 4 | 4 | 4 | 4 | 4 | 4 | 4 |
| Points | 1 | 4 | 7 | 8 | 8 | 11 | 14 | 14 | 17 | 20 | 20 | 23 | 24 | 25 | 28 | 28 | 31 | 34 | 37 | 40 | 43 | 44 | 47 | 47 | 50 | 53 | 56 | 57 | 60 | 63 | 64 | 65 | 65 | 66 |

Source: Liga Portugal
A = Away; H = Home; W = Win; D = Draw; L = Loss; P = Postponed

==== Matches ====
The league fixtures were released on 7 July 2024.

Win Draw Loss Fixtures

| 11 August 2024 1 | Braga | 1–1 | Estrela da Amadora | Braga |
| 20:30 WEST | El Ouazzani 53'; Moutinho (yellow card) 67'; Zalazar (yellow card) 86'; Marques (yellow card) 87' | Report | Keliano (yellow card) 45'; Kikas 80'; Nani (yellow card) 86'; Bucca (yellow card) 90'; Ruiz (yellow card) 90'; Lopes (yellow card) 90+7' | Stadium: Estádio Municipal de Braga; Attendance: 14,746; Referee: Ricardo Baixinho |

| 18 August 2024 2 | Boavista | 0–1 | Braga | Porto |
| 20:30 WEST | Silva (yellow card) 58'; Pérez (yellow card) 73'; Boženík (yellow card) 90+4' | Report | Fernández 40'; Gómez (yellow card) 83' | Stadium: Estádio do Bessa; Attendance: 7,119; Referee: António Nobre |

| 25 August 2024 3 | Braga | 3–1 | Moreirense | Braga |
| 20:30 WEST | Martínez 43'; Zalazar 56', 76' | Report | Marcelo (yellow card) 25'; Nlavo 53'; Santos (yellow card) 81' | Stadium: Estádio Municipal de Braga; Attendance: 14,155; Referee: Nuno Almeida |

| 1 September 2024 4 | Gil Vicente | 0–0 | Braga | Barcelos |
| 20:30 WEST | Cruz (yellow card) 42'; Mboula (yellow card) 71'; Fujimoto (yellow card) 77'; Andrew (yellow card) 82' | Report | Carvalho (yellow card) 45' | Stadium: Estádio Cidade de Barcelos; Attendance: 7,140; Referee: Fábio Veríssimo |

| 15 September 2024 5 | Braga | 0–2 | Vitória de Guimarães | Braga |
| 20:30 WEST | Zalazar (yellow card) 37'; Arrey-Mbi (red card) 56'; Niakaté (yellow card) 71'; Ferreira (yellow card) 79' | Report | Santos (yellow card) 17'; J. Mendes 52'; Oliveira (yellow card) 57'; Ribeiro 59'; J. T. Mendes (yellow card) 74' | Stadium: Estádio Municipal de Braga; Attendance: 21,215; Referee: Luís Godinho |

| 20 September 2024 6 | Nacional | 0–3 | Braga | Funchal |
| 20:15 WEST | Dias (yellow card) 29'; Zé Vitor (yellow card) 75'; Sousa (yellow card) 90+2' | Report | Gorby (yellow card) 25'; Ribeiro (yellow card) 27'; Niakaté 77'; Ferreira (yellow card) 81'; Bruma 83'; El Ouazzani 85' | Stadium: Estádio da Madeira; Attendance: 2,459; Referee: Hélder Malheiro |

| 29 September 2024 7 | Braga | 4–0 | Rio Ave | Braga |
| 20:30 WEST | Martínez 31'; Gharbi 38'; R. Horta 66'; Bruma 90+3' | Report | Panzo (yellow card) 42'; Vrousai (yellow card) 60' | Stadium: Estádio Municipal de Braga; Attendance: 11,888; Referee: Cláudio Pereira |

| 6 October 2024 8 | Porto | 2–1 | Braga | Porto |
| 20:30 WEST | João Mário (yellow card) 19'; Galeno 45+1' (pen.); Pepê (yellow card) 47' (goal) 59' | Report | João Ferreira (yellow card) 44'; Roger Fernandes 54'; Vitor Carvalho (yellow card) 75' | Stadium: Estádio do Dragão; Attendance: 44,813; Referee: (Portugal) João Pinheiro |

| 27 October 2024 9 | Braga | 2–0 | Farense | Braga |
| 15:30 WEST | Ismaël Gharbi 41'; El Ouazzani 70'; Niakaté (yellow card) 90+2' | Report | Álex Millán (yellow card) 56'; Ângelo Neto (yellow card) 59' | Stadium: Estádio Municipal de Braga; Attendance: 12,841; Referee: (Portugal) João Ferreira |

| 3 November 2024 10 | Arouca | 1–2 | Braga | Arouca |
| 18:00 WEST | Trezza (yellow card) 6'; José Fontán (yellow card) 9'; David Simão (yellow card) 24'; Sylla 90' | Report | Bruma 16' (pen.); Zalazar (yellow card) 28'; El Ouazzani 54'; Vitor Carvalho (yellow card) 69' | Stadium: Estádio Municipal de Arouca; Attendance: 1,631; Referee: (Portugal) Ricardo Baixinho |

| 10 November 2024 11 | Braga | 2–4 | Sporting CP | Braga |
| 18:45 WEST | Ricardo Horta 20' 45'; João Ferreira (yellow card) 38'; Roger Fernandes (yellow card) 45+3'; El Ouazzani (yellow card) 57'; Paulo Oliveira (yellow card) 68'; Gabri Martínez (yellow card) 90+1' | Report | Pote (yellow card) 13'; Diomande (yellow card) 53'; Morita 58'; Hjulmand (yellow card) 80' (goal) 81'; Harder 89' 90+4'; Geovany Quenda (yellow card) 90+1' | Stadium: Estádio Municipal de Braga; Attendance: 20,585; Referee: (Portugal) Luís Godinho |

| 1 December 2024 12 | AVS | 0–1 | Braga | Aves |
| 20:30 WET | Fernando Fonseca (yellow card) 25'; Jorge Teixeira (red card) 76'; Lucas Piazon (yellow card) 85'; Jaume Grau (yellow card) 86' | Report | Bruma (yellow card) 21'; Gabri Martínez 69' | Stadium: Estádio do CD Aves; Attendance: 2,579; Referee: (Portugal) António Nobre |

| 6 December 2024 13 | Braga | 2–2 | Estoril | Braga |
| 20:15 WET | Bruma 16' 56' (pen.); Gabri Martínez (yellow card) 52'; Arrey-Mbi (yellow card) 68'; Roberto Fernández (yellow card) 90+8' | Report | Bacher (yellow card) 54'; Marqués 68' (pen.); Gonçalo Costa (yellow card) 72' (goal) 82'; André Lacximicant (yellow card) 85'; Joel Robles (yellow card) 90+3'; João Carvalho (yellow card) 90+8' | Stadium: Estádio Municipal de Braga; Attendance: 9,071; Referee: (Portugal) Bruno Vieira |

| 16 December 2024 14 | Braga | 3–3 | Famalicão | Braga |
| 18:45 WET | Roberto Fernández 62'; Paulo Oliveira 77'; Ricardo Horta 90+4' | Report | El Ouazzani 45+3' (o.g.); Gustavo Sá 56'; Lucas Calegari (yellow card) 61'; Gil Dias 70' | Stadium: Estádio Municipal de Braga; Attendance: 8,322; Referee: (Portugal) Hélder Malheiro |

| 22 December 2024 15 | Santa Clara | 0–2 | Braga | Ponta Delgada |
| 17:00 WET | Lucas Soares (yellow card) 22' (yellow-red card) 22'; Matheus Pereira (yellow card) 90+6' | Report | Paulo Oliveira (yellow card) 33'; Bruma 51' 77' (pen.); Niakaté (yellow card) 65'; João Moutinho (yellow card) 83'; Yuri Ribeiro (yellow card) 84'; Robson Bambu (yellow card) 87' | Stadium: Estádio de São Miguel; Attendance: 4,041; Referee: (Portugal) Tiago Martins |

| 29 December 2024 16 | Braga | 1–2 | Casa Pia | Braga |
| 18:00 WET | El Ouazzani 45+2'; Robson Bambu (yellow card) 63'; Arrey-Mbi (yellow card) 83' | Report | Gaizka Larrazabal (yellow card) 25'; Segovia 40'; Beni (yellow card) 66'; Nuno Moreira 70'; André Geraldes (yellow card) 90+1' | Stadium: Estádio Municipal de Braga; Attendance: 20,819; Referee: (Portugal) David Silva |

| 4 January 2025 17 | Benfica | 1–2 | Braga | Lisbon |
| 18:00 WET | Di María (yellow card) 52'; Arthur Cabral 77' (yellow card) 79'; Barreiro (yellow card) 88'; Beste (yellow card) 89' | Report | Fran Navarro 17'; Gorby (yellow card) 36'; Robson Bambu 40'; Matheus (yellow card) 54'; João Ferreira (yellow card) 90+3' | Stadium: Estádio da Luz; Attendance: 61,750; Referee: (Portugal) Luís Godinho |

| 19 January 2025 18 | Estrela | 0–1 | Braga | Amadora |
| 18:00 WET | Bucca (yellow card) 84'; Nilton Varela (yellow card) 87'; Manu (yellow card) 90+2' | Report | Gabri Martínez (yellow card) 79'; El Ouazzani 90+3' | Stadium: Estádio José Gomes; Attendance: 2,719; Referee: (Portugal) Iancu Vasilica |

| 26 January 2025 19 | Braga | 3–0 | Boavista | Braga |
| 20:30 WET | Fran Navarro 14' 69' (pen.); Ricardo Horta 33'; Gorby (yellow card) 65'; Gabri Martínez (yellow card) 80' | Report | Abascal (red card) 80' | Stadium: Estádio Municipal de Braga; Attendance: 4,265; Referee: (Portugal) Hélder Malheiro |

| 3 February 2025 20 | Moreirense | 1–2 | Braga | Moreira de Cónegos |
| 18:45 WET | Guilherme Schettine 4'; Pedro Santos (yellow card) 43'; Maracás (yellow card) 90+5' | Report | João Moutinho 66'; Ricardo Horta 90+4' (yellow card) 90+5' | Stadium: Parque de Jogos Comendador Joaquim de Almeida Freitas; Attendance: 2,175; Referee: (Portugal) Claúdio Pereira |

| 9 February 2025 21 | Braga | 2–0 | Gil Vicente | Braga |
| 18:00 WET | Roger Fernandes 10' 81' | Report | Jorge Aguirre (red card) 15' | Stadium: Estádio Municipal de Braga; Attendance: 12,304; Referee: (Portugal) António Nobre |

| 16 February 2025 22 | Vitória de Guimarães | 0–0 | Braga | Guimarães |
| 20:30 WET | Borevković (yellow card) 4'; Nélson Oliveira (yellow card) 37'; Beni (yellow card) 83'; João Mendes (yellow card) 85'; Villanueva (yellow card) 90' | Report | Arrey-Mbi (yellow card) 42'; Robson Bambu (yellow card) 56'; João Ferreira (yellow card) 90+2' | Stadium: Estádio D. Afonso Henriques; Attendance: 28,133; Referee: (Portugal) João Ferreira |

| 21 February 2025 23 | Braga | 1–0 | Nacional | Braga |
| 20:15 WET | Gorby 37'; Račić (yellow card) 77' | Report | Matheus Dias (yellow card) 70'; Labidi (yellow card) 79' | Stadium: Estádio Municipal de Braga; Attendance: 7,872; Referee: (Portugal) Claúdio Pereira |

| 2 March 2025 24 | Rio Ave | 2–1 | Braga | Vila do Conde |
| 20:30 WET | Clayton 5'; Tıknaz (yellow card) 31'; Panzo 70'; Martim Neto (yellow card) 87' | Report | Fran Navarro 10' (yellow card) 36'; João Moutinho (yellow card) 54'; Ismaël Gharbi (yellow card) 65'; Račić (yellow card) 78'; Francisco Chissumba (yellow card) 90+2' | Stadium: Estádio do Rio Ave FC; Attendance: 5,250; Referee: (Portugal) Fábio Veríssimo |

| 8 March 2025 25 | Braga | 1–0 | Porto | Braga |
| 20:30 WET | Ricardo Horta 17'; João Moutinho (yellow card) 88'; Tiago Sá (red card) 90'; Francisco Chissumba (yellow card) 90+2' | Report | Pérez (yellow card) 6'; Gonçalo Borges (yellow card) 9'; Martim Fernandes (yellow card) 15'; Otávio (yellow card) 90+1' | Stadium: Estádio Municipal de Braga; Attendance: 15,922; Referee: (Portugal) Luís Godinho |

| 15 March 2025 26 | Farense | 0–1 | Braga | Faro |
| 15:30 WET | Pastor (yellow card) 71'; Filipe Soares (yellow card) 90+4' | Report | Robson Bambu (yellow card) 56'; Gabri Martínez 70' | Stadium: Estádio de São Luís; Attendance: 6,064; Referee: (Portugal) Gustavo Correia |

| 29 March 2025 27 | Braga | 2–1 | Arouca | Braga |
| 20:30 WET | Ricardo Horta 39'; Račić 44' (yellow card) 61'; Zalazar (yellow card) 64' | Report | Trezza 68'; Fukui (yellow card) 77'; José Fontán (yellow card) 87' | Stadium: Estádio Municipal de Braga; Attendance: 12,122; Referee: (Portugal) Bruno Pires Costa |

| 7 April 2025 28 | Sporting CP | 1–1 | Braga | Lisbon |
| 20:45 WET | Viktor Gyökeres 15' | Report | Afonso Patrão 87' | Stadium: Estádio José Alvalade; Attendance: 45,626; Referee: Luís Godinho |

| 13 April 2025 29 | Braga | 4–1 | AVS | Braga |
| 18:00 WET | R. Horta 5' Račić 26' 37' El Ouazzani 90+3' | [https://us.soccerway.com/matches/2025/04/13/portugal/portuguese-liga-/braga/avs/4405027/ Report] | Rafa Vela Rodrigues 45+1' | Stadium: Estádio Municipal de Braga; Attendance: 14,529 |

| 19 April 2025 30 | Estoril | 0–2 | Braga | Estoril |
| 18:00 WET | | [https://www.soccerway.com/match/braga-dpUer7ht/estoril-htoKuYZl/?mid=O0OMoQ6C Report] | Gharbi 5' 21' | Stadium: Estádio António Coimbra da Mota; Attendance: 3,656 |

| 25 April 2025 31 | Famalicão | 1–1 | Braga | Vila Nova de Famalicão |
| 20:30 WET | | [https://us.soccerway.com/matches/2025/04/25/portugal/portuguese-liga-/famalic-o/braga/4405042/ Report] | | Stadium: Estádio Municipal 22 de Junho; Attendance: 4,665; Referee: João Gonçalves |

| 3 May 2025 32 | Braga | 1–1 | Santa Clara | Braga |
| 18:00 WET | R. Horta 47' | [https://uk.soccerway.com/matches/2025/05/03/portugal/portuguese-liga-/sporting-braga/cd-santa-clara/4405050/ Report] | Rafael Oliveira António 6' | Stadium: Estádio Municipal de Braga; Attendance: 14,901 |

| 10 May 2025 33 | Casa Pia | 2–1 | Braga | Rio Maior |
| 20:30 WET | Fahem Benaïssa-Yahia 45' Livolant 79' | [https://us.soccerway.com/matches/2025/05/10/portugal/portuguese-liga-/casa-pia/braga/4405062/ Report] | Zalazar 20' | Stadium: Estádio Municipal de Rio Maior; Attendance: 1,342 |

| 16 May 2025 34 | Braga | 1–1 | Benfica | Braga |
| | Zalazar 24' (pen.) | [https://us.soccerway.com/matches/2025/05/17/portugal/portuguese-liga-/sporting-braga/benfica/4405069/ Report] | Pavlidis 63' | Stadium: Estádio Municipal de Braga; Attendance: 20,198; Referee: Miguel Nogueira |

=== Taça de Portugal ===
Win Draw Loss Fixtures

| 19 October 2024 Third round | 1º Dezembro | 1–2 | Braga | Queluz |
| 17:30 WET | Dias (yellow card) 39'; Morais 74'; Bernardo (yellow card) 80'; Soares (yellow card) 90+4' | Report | Zalazar 22'; Martínez (yellow card) 49'; Moutinho 90+5' | Stadium: Estádio do Real SC; Referee: Tiago Martins |

| 23 November 2024 Fourth round | Leixões | 0–2 | Braga | Matosinhos |
| 18:30 WET | João Oliveira (yellow card) 29'; Alhassan (yellow card) 44'; Rafael Santos (yellow card) 60' (yellow-red card) 65'; Paulinho (yellow card) 79'; André André (yellow card) 82' | Report | Hugo Basto 12' (o.g.); Niakaté (yellow card) 27'; Bruma 66'; Ismaël Gharbi (yellow card) 88' | Stadium: Estádio do Mar; Referee: (Portugal) Gustavo Correia |

| 15 January 2025 Fifth round | Braga | 2–1 | Lusitano Évora | Braga |
| 20:15 WET | André Horta 22'; Ricardo Horta 44'; Niakaté (yellow card) 83' | Report | Marcos Soares (yellow card) 21'; Afonso Sousa 84'; Kenneth Kalunga (yellow card) 90' | Stadium: Estádio Municipal de Braga; Attendance: 5,627; Referee: (Portugal) Bruno Costa |

| 26 February 2025 Quarter-finals | Benfica | 1–0 | Braga | Lisbon |
| 20:45 WET | Pavlidis 39'; Álvaro Carreras (yellow card) 46'; Otamendi (yellow card) 90+4' | Report | Ricardo Horta (yellow card) 68'; Fran Navarro (yellow card) 78'; Robson Bambu (yellow card) 90+1' | Stadium: Estádio da Luz; Attendance: 56,927; Referee: (Portugal) João Pinheiro |

=== Taça da Liga ===
Win Draw Loss Fixtures

| 31 October 2024 Quarter-finals | Braga | 2–1 | Vitória de Guimarães | Braga |
| 18:45 WET | Niakaté 22'; Ferreira (yellow card) 41'; Zalazar (yellow card) 52'; Bruma 75' (pen.) | Report | Santos 10'; Händel (yellow card) 13'; Charles Silva (yellow card) 18'; Borevković (yellow card) 45' (yellow-red card) 70'; Villanueva (yellow card) 63'; Baio (yellow card) 77' | Stadium: Estádio Municipal de Braga; Attendance: 9,663; Referee: Fábio Veríssimo |

| 8 January 2025 Semi-finals | Benfica | 3–0 | Braga | Leiria |
| 19:45 WET | Di María 27' 37'; Álvaro Carreras 28' | Report | João Ferreira (yellow card) 62'; Jónatas Noro (red card) 78'; Roger Fernandes (yellow card) 83' | Stadium: Estádio Dr. Magalhães Pessoa; Attendance: 19,917; Referee: (Portugal) Cláudio Pereira |

=== UEFA Europa League ===
==== Qualifying phase ====
===== Second qualifying round =====
The second qualifying round draw was held on 19 June 2024, Braga were drawn against Israeli Premier League side Maccabi Petah Tikva.

| 25 July 2024 First leg | Braga (Portugal) | 2–0 | (Israel) Maccabi Petah Tikva | Braga |
| 20:30 WEST | R. Horta 56'; Zalazar 59' (pen.); Saatçı (yellow card) 66' | Report | Karo (yellow card) 9'; Wolff (yellow card) 41'; Hazan (yellow card) 48' | Stadium: Estádio Municipal de Braga; Attendance: 14,891; Referee: Luca Pairetto (Italy) |

| 1 August 2024 Second leg | Maccabi Petah Tikva (Israel) | 0–5 (0–7 agg.) | (Portugal) Braga | Sofia, Bulgaria |
| 21:30 EEST | Azugi (yellow card) 28'; Teper (yellow card) 45+1'; Glazer (yellow card) 87' | Report | Marín (yellow card) 6', (goal) 29'; Fernandes 41'; Zalazar 45+4'; Galabov 62' (o.g.); El Ouazzani 90+1' (pen.) | Stadium: Stadion Georgi Asparuhov; Attendance: 211; Referee: Evangelos Manouchos (Greece) |
Note: Due to the Gaza war, Israeli teams are required to play their home matches at neutral venues until further notice.

===== Third qualifying round =====
The third qualifying round draw was held on 22 July 2024, Braga were drawn against Swiss Super League side Servette.

| 8 August 2024 First leg | Braga (Portugal) | 0–0 | (Switzerland) Servette | Braga |
| 20:30 WEST | Bruma (yellow card) 15'; El Ouazzani (yellow card) 78'; Zalazar (yellow card) 90+11' | Report | Rouiller (yellow card) 90+9' | Stadium: Estádio Municipal de Braga; Attendance: 16,603; Referee: Giorgi Kruashvili (Georgia) |

| 15 August 2024 Second leg | Servette (Switzerland) | 1–2 (1–2 agg.) | (Portugal) Braga | Geneva, Switzerland |
| 20:30 CEST | Douline (yellow card) 62'; Antunes (yellow card) 62'; Crivelli (yellow card) 85'; Kutesa 90+1' | Report | El Ouazzani 45+1'; Zalazar (yellow card) 65'; Fernández 69', (yellow card) 71' | Stadium: Stade de Genève; Attendance: 15,179; Referee: Igor Pajač (Croatia) |

===== Play-off round =====
The play-off round draw was held on 5 August 2024, Braga were drawn against Austrian Football Bundesliga side Rapid Wien.

| 22 August 2024 First leg | Braga (Portugal) | 2–1 | (Austria) Rapid Wien | Braga |
| 20:30 WEST | Carvalho (yellow card) 31', (goal) 33'; Bambu (yellow card) 59'; Zalazar 71' | Report | Grgić (red card) 2'; Burgstaller 25'; Auer (yellow card) 45+2'; Schaub (yellow card) 77' | Stadium: Estádio Municipal de Braga; Attendance: 15,868; Referee: Mykola Balakin (Ukraine) |

| 29 August 2024 Second leg | Rapid Wien (Austria) | 2–2 (3–4 agg.) | (Portugal) Braga | Vienna, Austria |
| 21:00 CEST | Arrey-Mbi 9' (o.g.); Sangare (yellow card) 25'; Bolla (yellow card) 33'; Jansson (yellow card) 45+4', (goal) 47'; Hedl (yellow card) 68'; Burgstaller (yellow card) 85' | Report | A. Horta (yellow card) 25'; El Ouazzani 68' (pen.); R. Horta 70'; Arrey-Mbi (yellow card) 82'; Fernandes (yellow card) 85' | Stadium: Allianz Stadion; Attendance: 21,400; Referee: Anthony Taylor (England) |

==== League phase ====
The league phase draw was held on 30 August 2024.

| Pos | Team | Pld | W | D | L | GF | GA | GD | Pts | Qualification |
|---|---|---|---|---|---|---|---|---|---|---|
| 23 | (Royal Dutch Football Association) Twente | 8 | 2 | 4 | 2 | 8 | 9 | −1 | 10 | Advance to knockout phase play-offs (unseeded) |
| 24 | (Turkish Football Federation) Fenerbahçe | 8 | 2 | 4 | 2 | 9 | 11 | −2 | 10 | Advance to knockout phase play-offs (unseeded) |
| 25 | (Portuguese Football Federation) Braga | 8 | 3 | 1 | 4 | 9 | 12 | −3 | 10 | |
| 26 | (Swedish Football Association) IF Elfsborg | 8 | 3 | 1 | 4 | 9 | 14 | −5 | 10 | |
| 27 | (German Football Association) TSG Hoffenheim | 8 | 2 | 3 | 3 | 11 | 14 | −3 | 9 | |

Source: UEFA
Rules for classification: League phase tiebreakers

| Round | 1 | 2 | 3 | 4 | 5 | 6 | 7 | 8 |
|---|---|---|---|---|---|---|---|---|
| Ground | H | A | H | A | H | A | A | H |
| Result | W | L | L | D | W | L | L | W |
| Position | 11 | 20 | 26 | 26 | 20 | 25 | 25 | 25 |
| Points | 3 | 3 | 3 | 4 | 7 | 7 | 7 | 10 |

Source: UEFA
A = Away; H = Home; W = Win; D = Draw; L = Loss

Win Draw Loss Fixtures

| 26 September 2024 1 | Braga (Portugal) | 2–1 | (Israel) Maccabi Tel Aviv | Braga |
| 20:00 WEST | Ribeiro (yellow card) 68'; Bruma 88', 90+5' (pen.); Sá (yellow card) 90+7'; Fernández (yellow card) 90+9' | Report | Shlomo (yellow card) 17'; Davida 30' (pen.); Kanichowsky (yellow card) 76' (yellow-red card) 90+8'; Asante (yellow card) 90+4' (yellow-red card) 90+9' | Stadium: Estádio Municipal de Braga; Attendance: 10,519; Referee: Matej Jug (Slovenia) |

| 3 October 2024 2 | Olympiacos (Greece) | 3–0 | (Portugal) Braga | Piraeus, Greece |
| 19:45 EEST | Retsos (yellow card) 43'; El Kaabi 45', 59'; Hezze 53', (yellow card) 63'; Ortega (yellow card) 88' | Report | Carvalho (yellow card) 45+2'; Ferreira (yellow card) 69' | Stadium: Karaiskakis Stadium; Attendance: 30,301; Referee: Damian Sylwestrzak (Poland) |

| 23 October 2024 3 | Braga (Portugal) | 1–2 | (Norway) Bodø/Glimt | Braga |
| 15:30 WEST | Moutinho (yellow card) 21'; Niakaté 64', (yellow card) 66' (yellow-red card) 67'; Oliveira (yellow card) 90+1' | Report | Zinckernagel (yellow card) 36'; Brunstad Fet (yellow card) 41'; Evjen 53'; Nielsen 90+4' | Stadium: Estádio Municipal de Braga; Attendance: 8,253; Referee: Nenad Minaković (Serbia) |

| 7 November 2024 4 | IF Elfsborg (Sweden) | 1–1 | (Portugal) Braga | Borås, Sweden |
| 18:45 CET | Baldursson (yellow card) 14'; Holten 84'; Hedlund (yellow card) 90' | Report | Ouma 67' (o.g.); Marques (yellow card) 90+2'; Oliveira (yellow card) 90+3' | Stadium: Borås Arena; Attendance: 9,402; Referee: Juxhin Xhaja (Albania) |

| 28 November 2024 5 | Braga (Portugal) | 3–0 | (Germany) TSG Hoffenheim | Braga |
| 20:00 WET | Bruma 2'; Roger Fernandes 8'; Vitor Carvalho 90+5' | Report | Hložek (yellow card) 40' | Stadium: Estádio Municipal de Braga; Attendance: 10,010; Referee: (Croatia) Igor Pajač |

| 12 December 2024 6 | Roma (Italy) | 3–0 | (Portugal) Braga | Rome, Italy |
| 18:45 CET | Pellegrini 10'; Saud Abdulhamid 47'; Hummels (yellow card) 72'; Mario Hermoso 90+1' | Report | Roger Fernandes (yellow card) 32'; Ricardo Horta (yellow card) 50'; Matheus (red card) 68' | Stadium: Stadio Olimpico; Attendance: 59,085; Referee: (Germany) Daniel Siebert |

| 23 January 2025 7 | Union Saint-Gilloise (Belgium) | 2–1 | (Portugal) Braga | Brussels, Belgium |
| 21:00 CET | Burgess (yellow card) 45' (yellow-red card) 90+6'; Ivanović 50' 74'; Machida (yellow card) 66' (yellow-red card) 82'; Rodríguez (yellow card) 73'; Sadiki (yellow card) 90'; Kamiel Van de Perre (yellow card) 90+5' | Report | El Ouazzani 16'; Vitor Carvalho (yellow card) 73' (yellow-red card) 79'; Niakaté (yellow card) 80'; Ricardo Horta (yellow card) 80'; Ismaël Gharbi (yellow card) 90'; Bruma (red card) 90+6' | Stadium: King Baudouin Stadium; Attendance: 7,729; Referee: (Scotland) Nick Walsh |
Note: Union Saint-Gilloise will play their home match at King Baudouin Stadium, Brussels, instead of their regular stadium, Joseph Marien Stadium, Brussels, which did not meet UEFA requirements.

| 30 January 2025 8 | Braga (Portugal) | 1–0 | (Italy) Lazio | Braga |
| 20:00 WET | Ricardo Horta 6' | Report | Mario Gila (yellow card) 69' | Stadium: Estádio Municipal de Braga; Attendance: 10,438; Referee: (England) John Brooks |
