= List of Portuguese football transfers winter 2024–25 =

This is a list of Portuguese football transfers for the 2024–24 winter transfer window. Only transfers featuring Liga Portugal are listed.

== Liga Portugal ==
Note: Flags indicate national team as has been defined under FIFA eligibility rules. Players may hold more than one non-FIFA nationality.

=== Arouca ===
In:

No.	Pos.	Nation	Player
21	MF	JPN	Taichi Fukui (from (Germany) Bayern Munich, previously on loan)
23	FW	URU	Dylan Nandín (on loan from (Uruguay) Racing de Montevideo)
24	FW	URU	Brian Mansilla (on loan from (Uruguay) Peñarol)
30	GK	SVK	Jakub Vinarčík (on loan from (Italy) Juventus)

Out:

No.	Pos.	Nation	Player
8	MF	CIV	Eboue Kouassi (released)
14	MF	ESP	Oriol Busquets (to (Spain) Andorra)
—	GK	BRA	Thiago Silva (released)
—	DF	BRA	Mateus Quaresma (released)
—	MF	POR	Ivo Rodrigues (to Moreirense)
—	MF	BRA	Vitinho (released)
—	FW	BLR	Vladislav Morozov (on loan to Paços de Ferreira)

=== AVS ===
In:

No.	Pos.	Nation	Player
7	MF	BRA	Lucas Fernandes (on loan from Portimonense)
9	FW	LUX	Gerson Rodrigues (on loan from (Ukraine) Dynamo Kyiv)
19	MF	URU	Tiago Galletto (from (Uruguay) River Plate)
33	DF	BRA	Aderllan Santos (from Rio Ave)
84	DF	POR	Tomás Tavares (from (Russia) Spartak Moscow, previously on loan to (Austria) LASK)

Out:

No.	Pos.	Nation	Player
9	FW	FRA	Issiaka Kamate (loan return to (Italy) Inter Milan, later loaned to (Italy) Modena)
—	DF	BRA	Leó Alaba (on loan to (Brazil) Criciúma)
—	MF	BRA	Jonatan Lucca (released)
—	MF	POR	Luís Silva (released)

=== Benfica ===
In:

No.	Pos.	Nation	Player
16	MF	POR	Manu Silva (from Vitória de Guimarães)
19	FW	ITA	Andrea Belotti (on loan from (Italy) Como)
26	DF	SWE	Samuel Dahl (on loan from (Italy) Roma)
27	MF	POR	Bruma (from Braga)

Out:

No.	Pos.	Nation	Player
23	MF	FRA	Soualiho Meïté (on loan to (Greece) PAOK)
28	DF	BFA	Issa Kaboré (loan return to (England) Manchester City, later loaned to (Germany) SV Werder Bremen)
32	MF	ARG	Benjamín Rollheiser (to (Brazil) Santos)
37	DF	GER	Jan-Niklas Beste (to (Germany) SC Freiburg)
—	MF	POR	Gerson Sousa (on loan to Estrela da Amadora)

=== Boavista ===
In:

No.	Pos.	Nation	Player
3	MF	FRA	Layvin Kurzawa (free agent)
21	MF	MLI	Abdoulay Diaby (from (Turkey) Pendikspor)

Out:

No.	Pos.	Nation	Player
—	DF	NGA	Bruno Onyemaechi (to (Greece) Olympiacos)

=== Braga ===
In:

No.	Pos.	Nation	Player
10	MF	SRB	Uroš Račić (on loan from (Italy) Sassuolo)
39	FW	ESP	Fran Navarro (on loan from Porto)

Out:

No.	Pos.	Nation	Player
1	GK	BRA	Matheus (on loan to (Netherlands) Ajax)
7	MF	POR	Bruma (to Benfica)
10	MF	POR	André Horta (on loan to (Greece) Olympiacos)
27	FW	ALG	Rafik Guitane (loan return to Estoril)
33	FW	POR	João Marques (on loan to Gil Vicente)
90	FW	ESP	Roberto Fernández (on loan to (Spain) Espanyol)
—	DF	POR	Yuri Ribeiro (to (England) Blackburn Rovers)

=== Casa Pia ===
In:

No.	Pos.	Nation	Player
13	FW	USA	Korede Osundina (from (Netherlands) Feyenoord)
23	DF	ANG	Khaly (from (Georgia (country)) Dila Gori)
24	MF	COM	Iyad Mohamed (from (France) Pau)
88	FW	BRA	Cauê (on loan from (Belgium) Lommel)

Out:

No.	Pos.	Nation	Player
7	MF	POR	Nuno Moreira (to (Brazil) Vasco da Gama)
8	MF	VEN	Telasco Segovia (to (United States) Inter Miami)
10	MF	ESP	Raúl Blanco (on loan to (Spain) Racing Ferrol)
16	MF	ANG	Beni Mukendi (to Vitória de Guimarães)
19	DF	BIH	Nermin Zolotić (to (Armenia) Noah)
77	FW	GHA	Samuel Obeng (to (Morocco) Wydad)

=== Estoril ===
In:

No.	Pos.	Nation	Player
40	MF	ROU	Andrei Florea (on loan from (Italy) Juventus)
60	DF	POR	João Costa (free agent)
80	DF	BRA	Leandro Santos (free agent)
99	FW	ALG	Rafik Guitane (loan return from Braga)
—	FW	GNB	Isnaba Mané (from Sporting CP U-23)

Out:

No.	Pos.	Nation	Player
2	DF	ESP	Raúl Parra (on loan to (Spain) Eldense, previously on loan at (Iraq) Al-Minaa)
3	DF	ESP	Ismael Sierra (on loan to (Spain) Osasuna)
8	MF	BRA	Michel (on loan to Marítimo)
11	MF	ANG	Hélder Costa (to (China) Yunnan Yukun)
71	DF	BRA	Volnei Feltes (to (Greece) Panserraikos)
—	FW	POR	André Gonçalves (to (Ukraine) Polissya Zhytomyr)

=== Estrela da Amadora ===
In:

No.	Pos.	Nation	Player
24	GK	POR	João Costa (from Feirense)
77	MF	POR	Gerson Sousa (on loan from Benfica)
—	DF	CRO	Renato Pantalon (from Rio Ave)
—	MF	FRA	Amine Oudrhiri (from Rio Ave)
—	MF	POR	Fábio Ronaldo (from Rio Ave)
—	FW	ANG	Chico Banza (from (Cyprus) Anorthosis Famagusta)

Out:

No.	Pos.	Nation	Player
3	DF	FRA	Till Cissokho (on loan to (France) Rodez)
6	MF	BRA	Igor Jesus (to (United States) Los Angeles)
8	MF	BRA	Daniel Cabral (on loan to (Brazil) Remo)
10	FW	BRA	André Luiz (to Rio Ave)
37	FW	BRA	Petterson (loan return to (Brazil) Flamengo)
99	FW	EGY	Bilal Mazhar (to (Greece) Lamia)
—	DF	POR	Tiago Gabriel (to (Italy) Lecce)
—	DF	POR	Danilo Veiga (to (Italy) Lecce)
—	FW	POR	Ronaldo Tavares (on loan to (Switzerland) Yverdon-Sport, previously on loan at (South Korea) Seoul)

=== Famalicão ===
In:

No.	Pos.	Nation	Player
3	DF	ECU	Leonardo Realpe (from (Brazil) Red Bull Bragantino, previously on loan)
12	FW	FRA	Simon Elisor (from (France) Metz)
13	DF	ANG	Pedro Bondo (from (Angola) Petro de Luanda)
15	MF	GEO	Otar Mamageishvili (from (Georgia (country)) Iberia 1999)
29	FW	CZE	Václav Sejk (on loan from (Czech Republic) Sparta Prague, previously on loan at (Poland) Zagłębie Lubin)

Out:

No.	Pos.	Nation	Player
19	MF	POR	Afonso Rodrigues (on loan to Paços de Ferreira)
28	MF	COM	Zaydou Youssouf (to (Saudi Arabia) Al Fateh)
—	DF	ESP	Dani Morer (on loan to Moreirense)
—	FW	ESP	Mario González (loan return to (United States) Los Angeles FC, later loaned to (Poland) Lech Poznań)

=== Farense ===
In:

No.	Pos.	Nation	Player
5	DF	POR	Tomás Ribeiro (from Vitória de Guimarães)
8	MF	POR	Zé Carlos (on loan from Vitória de Guimarães)
10	FW	GAM	Yusupha Njie (on loan from (Qatar) Al-Markhiya, previously on loan at (Brazil) Santos)
19	FW	POR	Rui Costa (from (Kazakhstan) Tobol)
20	FW	POR	Rony Lopes (on loan from (Turkey) Alanyaspor)
80	MF	POR	Samuel Justo (on loan from Sporting CP B)

Out:

No.	Pos.	Nation	Player
8	MF	POR	Rafael Barbosa (to (Poland) Radomiak Radom)
19	FW	ESP	Álex Millán (to (Spain) Cartagena)
79	MF	FRA	Mehdi Merghem (to (Algeria) USM Alger)

=== Gil Vicente ===
In:

No.	Pos.	Nation	Player
22	MF	ESP	Sergio Bermejo (from (Spain) Zaragoza)
29	FW	BRA	Carlos Eduardo (from Felgueiras)
33	FW	POR	João Marques (on loan from Braga)
—	FW	CIV	Mohamed Bamba (from (France) Lorient)

Out:

No.	Pos.	Nation	Player
11	FW	ESP	Diego Collado (on loan to (Spain) Eldense)
24	MF	CIV	Mory Gbane (to (France) Stade Reims)
—	FW	POR	André Liberal (on loan to Paços de Ferreira, previously on loan at Sanjoanense)

=== Moreirense ===
In:

No.	Pos.	Nation	Player
2	DF	ESP	Dani Morer (on loan from Famalicão)
3	DF	BRA	Michel (on loan from (Brazil) Palmeiras)
8	MF	POR	Ivo Rodrigues (from Arouca)
19	MF	ESP	Joel Jorquera (from (Spain) Eldense)
99	FW	BRA	Yan Maranhão (from Anadia)
—	MF	CMR	Cedric Teguia (from (Spain) Cartagena)

Out:

No.	Pos.	Nation	Player
14	DF	CPV	Carlos Ponck (to (Israel) Hapoel Be'er Sheva)
31	FW	BRA	Madson (to (Mexico) Juárez)
—	DF	BRA	Fabiano (on loan to (Brazil) Ceará)
—	MF	BRA	Gabrielzinho (on loan to (China) Shanghai Port)

=== Nacional ===
In:

No.	Pos.	Nation	Player
14	DF	CPV	Ivanildo Fernandes (free agent)
71	MF	JPN	Fūki Yamada (on loan from (Japan) Kyoto Sanga)
98	FW	BRA	Paulinho Bóia (from (Brazil) Paysandu)

Out:

No.	Pos.	Nation	Player
9	FW	ESP	Adrián Butzke (loaned return to Vitória de Guimarães, later loaned to (Spain) Mirandés)
11	FW	CUW	Nigel Thomas (loaned return to (Denmark) Viborg, later loaned to Académico de Viseu)

=== Porto ===
In:

No.	Pos.	Nation	Player
7	MF	BRA	William Gomes (from (Brazil) São Paulo)
25	MF	ARG	Tomás Pérez (from (Argentina) Newell's Old Boys)

Out:

No.	Pos.	Nation	Player
13	MF	BRA	Galeno (to (Saudi Arabia) Al-Ahli)
16	MF	ESP	Nico González (to (England) Manchester City)
17	MF	ESP	Iván Jaime (on loan to (Spain) Valencia)
18	DF	BRA	Wendell (to (Brazil) São Paulo)
21	FW	ESP	Fran Navarro (on loan to Braga)
—	FW	BRA	Wendel Silva (on loan to Santa Clara, previously on loan at (Brazil) Santos)

=== Rio Ave ===
In:

No.	Pos.	Nation	Player
3	DF	GRE	Andreas Ntoi (on loan from (Greece) Olympiacos)
4	DF	ENG	Nelson Abbey (on loan from (Greece) Olympiacos)
7	FW	BRA	André Luiz (from Estrela da Amadola)
22	DF	BRA	João Pedro (on loan from (United States) Charlotte FC)
29	MF	GRE	Theofanis Bakoulas (on loan from (Greece) Olympiacos)
95	GK	BRA	Matheus Teixeira (from (Brazil) Bahia)

Out:

No.	Pos.	Nation	Player
4	DF	BRA	Patrick William (to (Japan) Kyoto Sanga)
10	MF	FRA	Amine Oudrhiri (to Estrela da Amadola)
18	GK	BRA	Jhonatan (to (Uzbekistan) Pakhtakor)
22	FW	EGY	Ahmed Hassan (to (France) Le Havre)
33	DF	BRA	Aderllan Santos (to AVS)
42	DF	CRO	Renato Pantalon (to Estrela da Amadola)
77	MF	POR	Fábio Ronaldo (to Estrela da Amadola)
—	DF	POR	João Muniz (loan return to Sporting CP)
—	FW	POR	Ferna (on loan to (United States) Charlotte FC)

=== Santa Clara ===
In:

No.	Pos.	Nation	Player
50	FW	BRA	Wendel Silva (on loan from Porto, previously on loan at (Brazil) Santos)
—	GK	PER	Gabriel Soto (from (Peru) Sporting Cristal)
—	DF	BRA	Edney Silva (from (Brazil) Palmeiras)

Out:

No.	Pos.	Nation	Player
19	MF	POR	Bruno Almeida (on loan to (Armenia) Noah)
28	DF	BRA	Habraão (loaned return to (Brazil) Fortaleza)
30	FW	BRA	Alisson Safira (on loan to (Romania) Universitatea Craiova)
48	MF	BRA	Mateus Ferreira (on loan to (Brazil) Guarani)
77	MF	BRA	Gustavo Klismahn (on loan to (Japan) Vissel Kobe)
—	GK	ARG	Andrés Mehring (released)
—	MF	BRA	Rildo (on loan to (Brazil) Portuguesa)
—	FW	POR	Melvin Costa (on loan to Académica)
—	FW	BRA	Gabriel de Morais (on loan to Académica)

=== Sporting CP ===
In:

No.	Pos.	Nation	Player
24	GK	POR	Rui Silva (on loan from (Spain) Real Betis)
30	MF	BRA	Biel Teixeira (from (Brazil) Bahia)
43	DF	POR	João Muniz (loan return from Rio Ave)

Out:

No.	Pos.	Nation	Player
10	MF	ENG	Marcus Edwards (on loan to (England) Burnley)
13	GK	BIH	Vladan Kovačević (on loan to (Poland) Legia Warsaw)
—	DF	POR	Rúben Vinagre (to (Poland) Legia Warsaw, previously on loan)

=== Vitória de Guimarães ===
In:

No.	Pos.	Nation	Player
—	DF	BRA	Hevertton (on loan from (England) Queens Park Rangers)
—	MF	POR	Umaro Embaló (on loan from (Netherlands) Fortuna Sittard)
—	MF	ANG	Beni Mukendi (from Casa Pia)
—	FW	GNB	Vando Félix (from Torreense)

Out:

No.	Pos.	Nation	Player
4	DF	POR	Tomás Ribeiro (to Farense)
6	MF	POR	Manu Silva (to Benfica)
11	MF	BRA	Kaio César (to (Saudi Arabia) Al Hilal)
22	DF	POR	Alberto Baio (to (Italy) Juventus)
28	MF	POR	Zé Carlos (on loan from Farense)
79	FW	POR	José Bica (on loan to Leixões)
—	DF	POR	Jorge Fernandes (to (Saudi Arabia) Al Fateh)
—	MF	ANG	Nelson da Luz (to (China) Qingdao West Coast, previously on loan)
—	FW	ESP	Adrián Butzke (on loan to (Spain) Mirandés, previously on loan at Nacional)

== See also ==
- 2024–25 Primeira Liga
