= Nílton =

Nílton or Nilton may refer to:

- Nilton (comedian), Portuguese comedian and judge on the Portuguese version of Thank God You're Here
- Nílton (footballer, born December 1987) (born 1987), Brazilian footballer
- Nílton (footballer, born April 1987) (born 1987), Brazilian footballer
- Nilton César (1939–2026), Brazilian singer
- Nilton Varela (born 2001), Portuguese footballer
