= Igor Jesus =

Igor Jesus may refer to:

- Igor Jesus (footballer, born 2001), Igor Jesus Maciel da Cruz, Brazilian football forward
- Igor Jesus (footballer, born 2003), Igor Jesus Lima, Brazilian football defensive midfielder
