= Robson Bambu =

Brazilian footballer

Robson
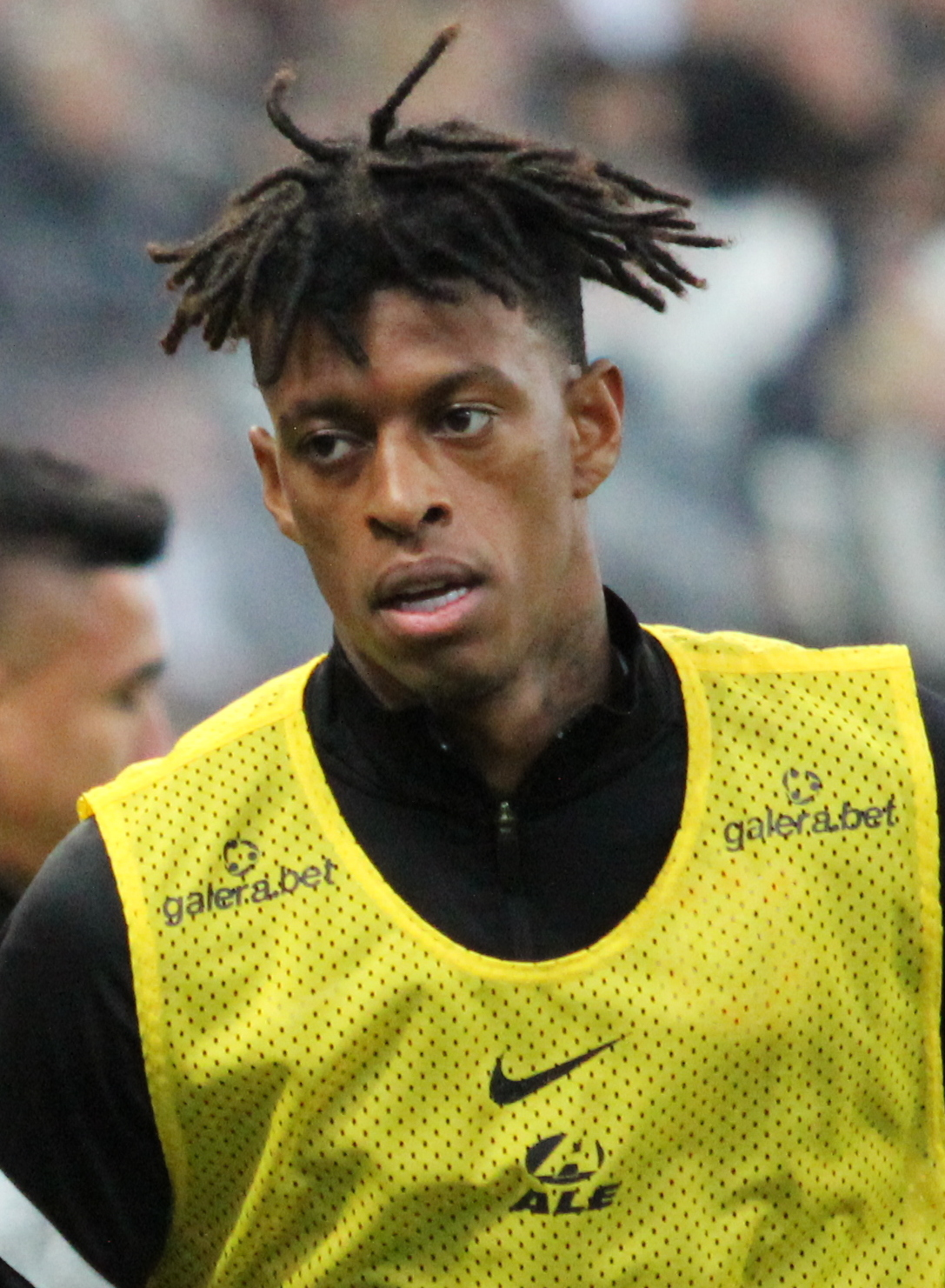
- Bambu with Corinthians in 2022

Personal information
- Full name: Robson Alves de Barros
- Date of birth: 12 November 1997 (age 28)
- Place of birth: São Vicente, Brazil
- Height: 1.85 m (6 ft 1 in)
- Position: Centre-back

Team information
- Current team: Atlético San Luis
- Number: 3

Youth career
- 2007–2017: Santos

Senior career*
Years	Team	Apps	(Gls)
2018	Santos	12	(0)
2019–2020	Athletico Paranaense	16	(0)
2020–2024	Nice	15	(0)
2022	→ Corinthians (loan)	9	(0)
2023	→ Vasco da Gama (loan)	21	(0)
2024	→ Arouca (loan)	10	(0)
2024–2025	Braga	15	(1)
2025–	Atlético San Luis	10	(0)

International career^{‡}
2016–2017	Brazil U20	4	(0)
2020	Brazil U23	3	(0)
- * Club domestic league appearances and goals as of 16:58, 9 November 2025 (UTC) ‡ National team caps and goals as of 00:02, 8 March 2020 (UTC)

Robson Alves de Barros (born 12 November 1997), known as Robson Bambu or just Robson, is a Brazilian professional footballer who plays as a centre-back for Liga MX club Atlético San Luis.

== Club career ==
=== Santos ===
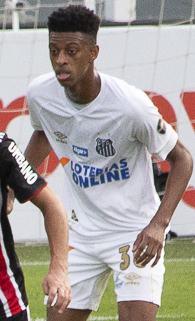
Bambu with Santos in 2018

Born in São Vicente, São Paulo, Bambu joined Santos' youth setup in 2007 at the age of ten. On 4 August 2016, he extended his contract until November 2018.

In January 2018, Bambu was promoted to the main squad by new manager Jair Ventura. He made his professional debut on 28 January, starting in a 1–1 Campeonato Paulista home draw against Ituano.

Bambu made his Série A debut on 25 August 2018, coming on as a first-half substitute for injured Gustavo Henrique in a 2–0 home win against Bahia. Three days later he made his Copa Libertadores debut, replacing injured Lucas Veríssimo in a 0–0 home draw against Independiente.

=== Athletico Paranaense ===
On 21 November 2018, Bambu was announced at Athletico Paranaense for the 2019 season.

=== Nice ===
On 5 June 2020, Bambu joined Nice in a deal worth €8 million euros. He played his first match for the club on 23 August, in a 2–1 Ligue 1 win against Lens.

On 20 January 2022, Nice sent Bambu on a one-year loan to Corinthians. He also spent the following year on loan at a Brazilian Série A club, this time Vasco da Gama.

In January 2024, Bambu joined Portuguese Primeira Liga club Arouca on loan for the remainder of the season with an optional buy-clause.

=== Braga ===
On 17 June 2024, Bambu moved to the Primeira Liga on a permanent basis, signing a four-year contract with Braga, for a reported transfer fee of €1.2 million.

=== Atlético San Luis ===
On 12 September 2025, Bambu joined Liga MX club Atlético San Luis for a transfer fee of €400.000, with Braga keeping a 50% sell-on fee.

== Career statistics ==
As of 28 August 2025

Appearances and goals by club, season and competition
Club	Season	League			State league		Cup		Continental		Other		Total	
Club	Season	Division	Apps	Goals	Apps	Goals	Apps	Goals	Apps	Goals	Apps	Goals	Apps	Goals
Santos	2018	Série A	9	0	3	0	0	0	1 (Note: Appearance(s) in Copa Libertadores)	0	—		13	0
Athletico Paranaense	2019	Série A	8	0	7	0	5	0	1	0	—		21	0
Athletico Paranaense	2020	Série A	0	0	1	0	0	0	2	0	0	0	3	0
Athletico Paranaense	Total		8	0	8	0	5	0	3	0	0	0	24	0
Nice	2020–21	Ligue 1	15	0	—		2	0	6 (Note: Appearance(s) in UEFA Europa League)	0	—		23	0
Nice	2023–24	Ligue 1	0	0	—		1	0	—		—		1	0
Nice	Total		15	0	—		3	0	6	0	—		24	0
Corinthians (loan)	2022	Série A	7	0	2	0	1	0	2	0	—		12	0
Vasco da Gama (loan)	2023	Série A	18	0	3	0	0	0	—		—		21	0
Arouca (loan)	2023–24	Primeira Liga	10	0	—		—		—		—		10	0
Braga	2024–25	Primeira Liga	15	1	—		3	0	4	0	1 (Note: Appearances in Taça da Liga)	0	23	1
Braga	2025–26	Primeira Liga	0	0	—		0	0	1	0	—		1	0
Braga	Total		15	1	—		3	0	5	0	1	0	24	1
Career total			82	1	16	0	12	0	17	0	1	0	128	1

== Honours ==
Athletico Paranaense

- Campeonato Paranaense: 2019
- J.League Cup / Copa Sudamericana Championship: 2019
- Copa do Brasil: 2019
