= Thiago Helguera =

Uruguayan footballer (born 2006)

Personal information
- Full name: Thiago Emanuel Helguera Merello
- Date of birth: 26 March 2006 (age 20)
- Place of birth: Paysandú, Uruguay
- Height: 1.81 m (5 ft 11 in)
- Position: Midfielder

Team information
- Current team: Atlético Madrileño (on loan from Braga)

Youth career
- Sportivo Independencia
- 2020–2023: Nacional

Senior career*
Years	Team	Apps	(Gls)
2023–2024	Nacional	16	(0)
2024–	Braga	1	(0)
2024–	Braga B	13	(0)
2025–2026	→ Mirandés (loan)	35	(0)
2026–	→ Atlético Madrileño (loan)	0	(0)

International career
2021	Uruguay U15	1	(0)
2022–2023	Uruguay U17	18	(0)
2024–2025	Uruguay U20	13	(0)
- * Club domestic league appearances and goals as of 9 June 2026

Thiago Emanuel Helguera Merello (born 26 March 2006) is a Uruguayan professional footballer who plays as a midfielder for Atlético Madrileño on loan from Primeira Liga club Braga.

== Club career ==
Born in Paysandú, Helguera began his career with local side Sportivo Independencia, representing the club at the under-13 national finals in 2019. He joined the academy of Nacional the following year, and was promoted to the first team, signing his first contract, in January 2023. He played his first game for the club in the 2023 edition of the Copa Río de la Plata, as Nacional lost to Argentinian opposition Colón de Santa Fe 5–4 on penalties after a 1–1 draw.

Helguera made his professional debut in the Uruguayan Primera División on 30 April 2023, coming on as a second-half substitute for Diego Zabala in a 3–0 win against La Luz. Following the game, Nacional manager Álvaro Gutiérrez said of Helguera "he has the tools, but you have to go carefully and slowly so that he can develop them".

On 14 June 2024, Helguera joined Primeira Liga club Braga on a five-year deal until June 2029. On 13 August of the following year, after featuring mainly with the reserves, he was loaned to Spanish Segunda División side Mirandés for one year.

== International career ==
Helguera has represented Uruguay at under-17 level. In January 2025, he was named in Uruguay's 23-man squad for the 2025 South American U-20 Championship.

== Career statistics ==
As of 1 June 2026

Appearances and goals by club, season and competition
Club	Season	League			National cup		League cup		Continental		Other		Total	
Club	Season	Division	Apps	Goals	Apps	Goals	Apps	Goals	Apps	Goals	Apps	Goals	Apps	Goals
Nacional	2023	Liga AUF Uruguaya	12	0	0	0	—		1 (Note: Appearance(s) in Copa Libertadores)	0	0	0	13	0
Nacional	2024	Liga AUF Uruguaya	4	0	0	0	—		3	0	0	0	7	0
Nacional	Total		16	0	0	0	—		4	0	0	0	20	0
Braga	2024–25	Primeira Liga	1	0	0	0	0	0	1 (Note: Appearance in UEFA Europa League)	0	—		2	0
Braga	2026–27	Primeira Liga	0	0	0	0	0	0	0	0	—		0	0
Braga	Total		1	0	0	0	0	0	1	0	—		2	0
Braga B	2024–25	Liga 3	13	0	—		—		—		—		13	0
Mirandés (loan)	2025–26	Segunda División	35	0	0	0	—		—		—		35	0
Career total			65	0	0	0	0	0	5	0	0	0	70	0
