= Sikou Niakaté =

Footballer (born 1999)

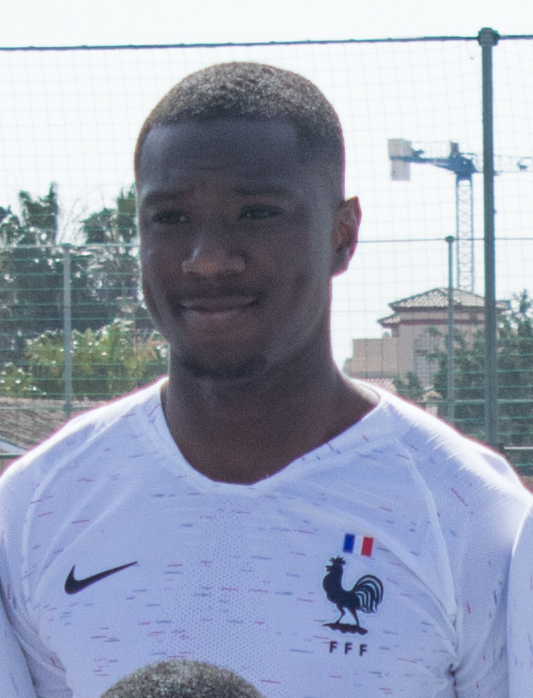
- Niakaté representing France U20 in 2019

Personal information
- Date of birth: 10 July 1999 (age 27)
- Place of birth: Montreuil, France
- Height: 1.86 m (6 ft 1 in)
- Position: Centre-back

Team information
- Current team: Braga
- Number: 4

Youth career
- 2005–2006: Saint-Germain-en-Laye
- 2006–2013: Paris Saint-Germain
- 2013–2015: Boulogne-Billancourt
- 2015–2016: Évreux
- 2016–2017: Valenciennes

Senior career*
| Years | Team | Apps | (Gls) |
| 2017–2018 | Valenciennes | 29 | (0) |
| 2018–2023 | Guingamp | 54 | (2) |
| 2018–2019 | → Valenciennes (loan) | 14 | (0) |
| 2021–2022 | → Metz (loan) | 12 | (0) |
| 2022–2023 | → Braga (loan) | 26 | (3) |
| 2023– | Braga | 54 | (1) |

International career^{‡}
| 2018 | France U19 | 6 | (0) |
| 2019 | France U20 | 1 | (0) |
| 2023– | Mali | 18 | (1) |
- * Club domestic league appearances and goals as of 4 April 2026 ‡ National team caps and goals as of 8 September 2025

Sikou Niakaté (born 10 July 1999) is a professional footballer who plays as a centre-back for Primeira Liga club S.C. Braga. Born in France, he plays for the Mali national team.

== Personal life ==
Sikou Niakaté was born in Montreuil, France. He holds French and Malian nationalities.

== Club career ==
Niakaté made his professional debut for Valenciennes FC in a 1–0 Ligue 2 loss to Nîmes Olympique on 31 July 2017, making his appearance at the age of 18.

On 31 August 2018, the last day of the 2018 summer transfer window, Niakaté joined Ligue 1 side Guingamp on a five-year contract. He was immediately loaned back to Valenciennes for the remainder of the season.

On 12 August 2021, he joined Metz on a season-long loan with an option to buy.

On 28 June 2022, Niakaté moved on loan to Braga in Portugal. Braga held an option to buy his rights at the end of the loan for €1.8 million, and if he played in half of the official games in the season, the option would become an obligation to buy. On 7 June 2023, Braga announced the triggering of the clause, with Niakaté signing a five-year contract.

On 20 September 2023, Niakate's 88th minute own goal prompted SC Braga 2–1 home defeat against SSC Napoli in SC Braga's first UEFA Champions League game in a decade.

== International career ==
Niakaté was called up to the France U17 national team in December 2015, becoming the first player in Évreux FC 27 history to do so.

Niakaté was called up to the Mali national team for the 2018 FIFA World Cup qualification match against Gabon. He officially decided to represent the home country of his parents, Mali, in 2023. He made his debut for the African nation in a 4–0 victory of Mali against South Sudan during the 2023 Africa Cup of Nations qualification, resulting in their qualification for the 2024 tournament.

On 11 December 2025, Niakaté was called up to the Mali squad for the 2025 Africa Cup of Nations.

== Career statistics ==
=== Club ===
As of match played 8 April 2026

Appearances and goals by club, season and competition
| Club | Season | League | | | National cup | | League cup | | Continental | | Total | |
| Club | Season | Division | Apps | Goals | Apps | Goals | Apps | Goals | Apps | Goals | Apps | Goals |
|---|---|---|---|---|---|---|---|---|---|---|---|---|
| Valenciennes | 2016–17 | Ligue 2 | 5 | 0 | — | | — | | — | | 5 | 0 |
| Valenciennes | 2017–18 | Ligue 2 | 24 | 0 | 1 | 0 | 3 | 0 | — | | 28 | 0 |
| Valenciennes | Total | | 29 | 0 | 1 | 0 | 3 | 0 | — | | 33 | 0 |
| Guingamp | 2019–20 | Ligue 2 | 23 | 1 | 1 | 0 | — | | — | | 24 | 1 |
| Guingamp | 2020–21 | Ligue 2 | 31 | 1 | 0 | 0 | — | | — | | 31 | 1 |
| Guingamp | | | 54 | 2 | 1 | 0 | — | | — | | 55 | 2 |
| Valenciennes (loan) | 2018–19 | Ligue 2 | 14 | 0 | 2 | 0 | — | | — | | 16 | 0 |
| Guingamp B | 2019–20 | CFA 2 | 1 | 0 | — | | — | | — | | 1 | 0 |
| Metz (loan) | 2021–22 | Ligue 1 | 12 | 0 | — | | — | | — | | 12 | 0 |
| Metz B | 2021–22 | CFA 2 | 4 | 0 | — | | — | | — | | 4 | 0 |
| Braga (loan) | 2022–23 | Primeira Liga | 26 | 3 | 3 | 0 | 2 | 0 | 3 (Note: One appearance in UEFA Europa League, two appearances in UEFA Europa Conference League) | 0 | 34 | 3 |
| Braga | 2023–24 | Primeira Liga | 19 | 0 | 1 | 0 | 1 | 1 | 11 (Note: Nine appearances in UEFA Champions League, two appearances in UEFA Europa League) | 1 | 32 | 2 |
| Braga | 2024–25 | Primeira Liga | 24 | 1 | 3 | 0 | 1 | 1 | 9 (Note: Appearances in UEFA Europa League) | 1 | 37 | 3 |
| Braga | 2025–26 | Primeira Liga | 11 | 0 | 2 | 0 | 1 | 0 | 12 | 0 | 26 | 0 |
| Braga | Total | | 54 | 1 | 6 | 0 | 3 | 2 | 32 | 2 | 95 | 5 |
| Career total | | | 194 | 6 | 13 | 0 | 8 | 2 | 35 | 2 | 249 | 10 |

=== International ===
As of match played 8 September 2025

Appearances and goals by national team and year
| National team | Year | Apps | Goals |
|---|---|---|---|
| Mali | 2023 | 5 | 0 |
| Mali | 2024 | 8 | 1 |
| Mali | 2025 | 5 | 0 |
| Total | | 18 | 1 |

Scores and results list Mali's goal tally first, score column indicates score after each Niakaté goal.

List of international goals scored by Sikou Niakaté
| No. | Date | Venue | Opponent | Score | Result | Competition |
|---|---|---|---|---|---|---|
| 1 | 6 January 2024 | Stade du 26 Mars, Bamako, Mali | Guinea-Bissau | 4–2 | 6–2 | Friendly |

== Honours ==
Braga

- Taça da Liga: 2023–24
