= João Ferreira (footballer) =

Portuguese footballer (born 2001)

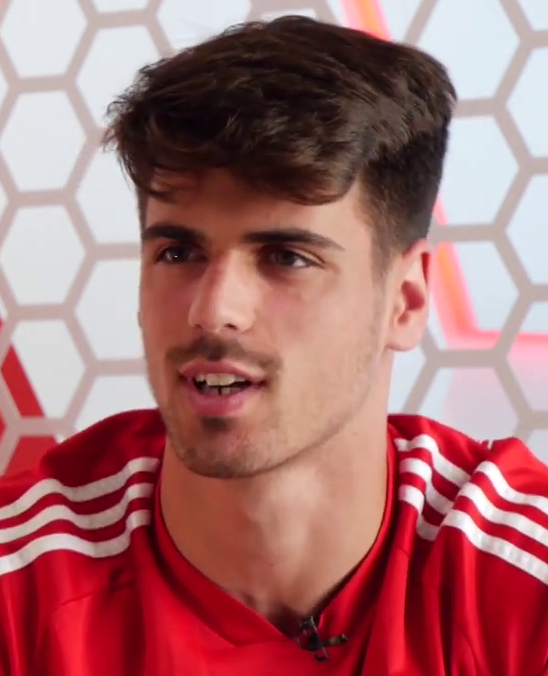
- Ferreira in 2020

Personal information
- Full name: João Diogo Fonseca Ferreira
- Date of birth: 22 March 2001 (age 25)
- Place of birth: Póvoa de Varzim, Portugal
- Height: 1.85 m (6 ft 1 in)
- Position: Defender

Team information
- Current team: Saint-Étienne
- Number: 13

Youth career
- 2011–2014: Rio Ave
- 2014–2019: Benfica

Senior career*
Years	Team	Apps	(Gls)
2019–2023	Benfica B	38	(2)
2019–2023	Benfica	1	(0)
2021–2022	→ Vitória de Guimarães (loan)	14	(0)
2022–2023	→ Rio Ave (loan)	8	(0)
2023–2025	Watford	5	(1)
2023–2024	→ Udinese (loan)	35	(0)
2024–2025	→ SC Braga (loan)	21	(0)
2025–	Saint-Étienne	15	(1)

International career^{‡}
2016	Portugal U15	2	(0)
2017	Portugal U16	2	(0)
2016–2018	Portugal U17	13	(0)
2018	Portugal U18	4	(0)
2019	Portugal U19	7	(1)
- * Club domestic league appearances and goals as of 11 May 2026 ‡ National team caps and goals as of 18 November 2019

João Diogo Fonseca Ferreira (born 22 March 2001) is a Portuguese professional footballer who plays as a right-back or centre-back for Ligue 2 club Saint-Étienne.

== Football career ==
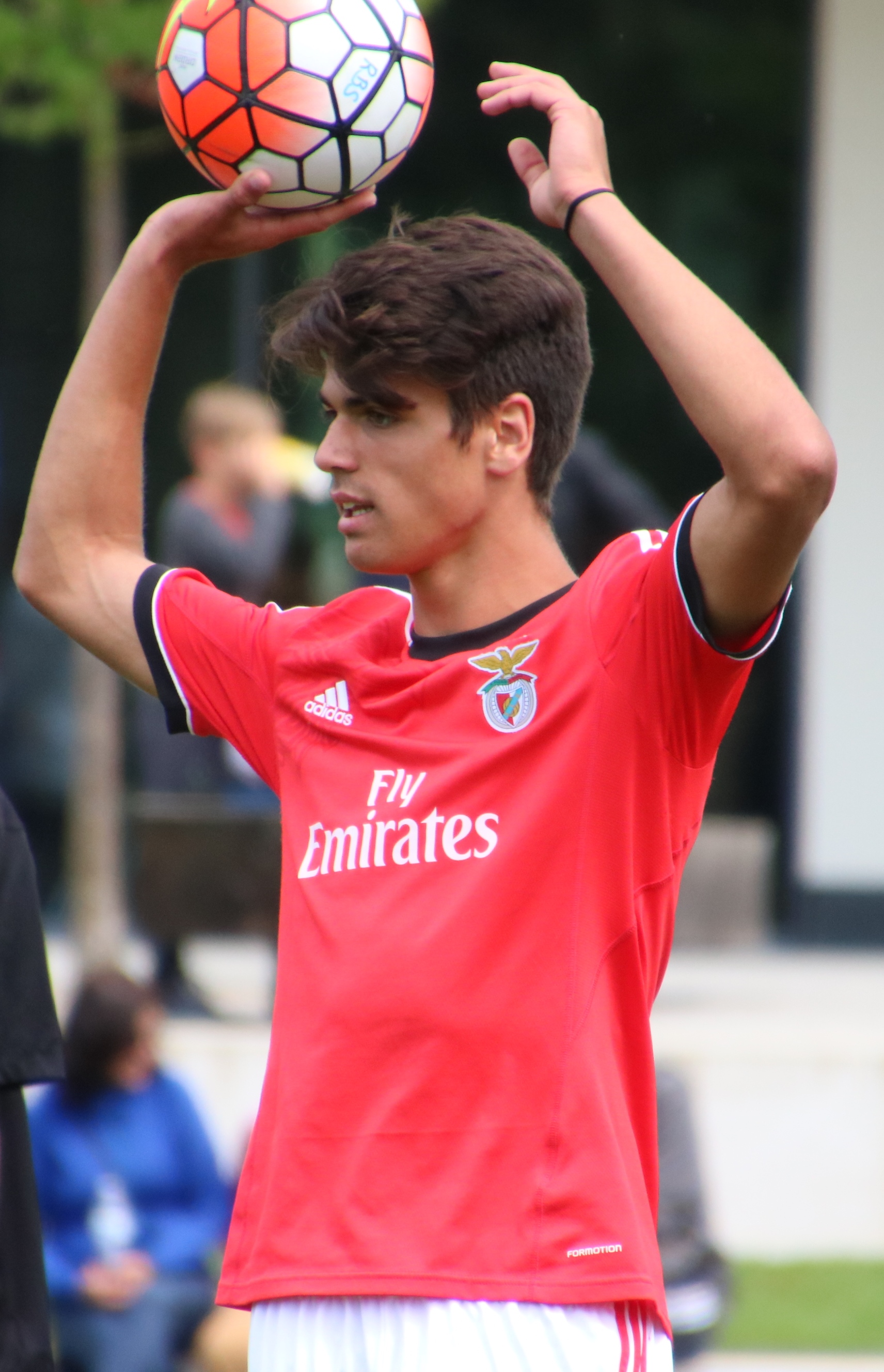
João Ferreira playing for Benfica B in 2016.

Born in Póvoa de Varzim, Ferreira made his professional debut with Benfica B in a 2–1 win over Estoril Praia in LigaPro on 11 August 2019. On 25 January 2021, he made his debut with the first team in a Primeira Liga 1–1 draw against Nacional.

On 31 August 2021, he joined Vitória de Guimarães on a season-long loan with an option to purchase for €5 million.

=== Watford ===
On 9 January 2023, Ferriera joined EFL Championship club Watford for an undisclosed fee. He made his league debut on 14 January 2023 as a half time substitute in a 2–0 win against Blackpool and scored the equalising goal in a 1–1 draw against Rotherham a week later in what was his first start for the club.

On 1 August 2023, Ferreira signed for Serie A club Udinese on a season-long loan deal.

=== Saint-Étienne ===
On 6 August 2025, Ferreira signed for Ligue 2 club Saint-Étienne on a four-year deal for an undisclosed fee.

== Career statistics ==
As of match played 17 May 2025

Club	Season	League			National cup (Note: Includes Taca de Portugal, Copa Italia)		League cup (Note: Includes Taca da Liga)		Continental		Other		Total	
Club	Season	Division	Apps	Goals	Apps	Goals	Apps	Goals	Apps	Goals	Apps	Goals	Apps	Goals
Benfica B	2019–20	Liga Portugal 2	18	1	—		—		—		—		18	1
Benfica B	2020–21	Liga Portugal 2	18	0	—		—		—		—		18	0
Benfica B	2021–22	Liga Portugal 2	2	1	—		—		—		—		2	1
Benfica B	Total		38	2	—		—		—		—		38	2
Benfica	2019–20	Primeira Liga	0	0	0	0	0	0	0	0	0	0	0	0
Benfica	2020–21	Primeira Liga	1	0	1	0	1	0	1	0	0	0	4	0
Benfica	Total		1	0	1	0	1	0	1	0	0	0	4	0
Vitória de Guimarães (loan)	2021–22	Primeira Liga	14	0	1	0	1	0	—		—		16	0
Rio Ave (loan)	2022–23	Primeira Liga	8	0	1	0	3	0	—		—		12	0
Watford	2022–23	Championship	5	1	—		—		—		—		5	1
Udinese (loan)	2023-24	Serie A	27	0	2	0	—		—		—		29	0
Braga (loan)	2024–25	Primeira Liga	21	0	2	0	2	0	7 (Note: Appearances in UEFA Europa League)	0	—		32	0
Career total			114	3	6	0	7	0	8	0	0	0	136	3

== Honours ==
Benfica

- UEFA Youth League runner-up: 2019–20
