= Diogo Travassos =

Portuguese footballer (born 2004)

- Travassos (center) in 2026

Personal information
- Full name: Diogo Martins Travassos
- Date of birth: 31 March 2004 (age 22)
- Place of birth: Almada, Portugal
- Height: 1.76 m (5 ft 9 in)
- Position: Right-back

Team information
- Current team: Braga
- Number: 7

Youth career
- 2010–2021: Sporting CP

Senior career*
Years	Team	Apps	(Gls)
2021–2026	Sporting CP B	27	(1)
2024–2026	Sporting CP	0	(0)
2024–2025	→ Estrela da Amadora (loan)	24	(1)
2025–2026	→ Moreirense (loan)	29	(5)
2026–	Braga	5	(0)

International career^{‡}
2021	Portugal U18	6	(0)
2021–2022	Portugal U19	6	(0)
2022	Portugal U20	2	(0)
2025–	Portugal U21	8	(2)
- * Club domestic league appearances and goals as of 19 October 2026 ‡ National team caps and goals as of 22:02, 30 September 2026 (UTC)

Diogo Martins Travassos (born 31 March 2004) is a Portuguese professional footballer who plays as a right-back for Primeira Liga club Braga.

== Career ==
Travassos is a youth product of Sporting CP since 2010 and worked his way up their youth categories. On 7 June 2021, he signed his first professional contract with Sporting CP until 2025 and was promoted to their reserves. On 2 October 2022, he extended his contract with the club until 2026. In March 2023 he suffered a knee injury requiring surgery, and the injury relapsed in January 2024 as he started training with Sporting's senior team which required another surgical procedure. On 2 September 2024, he joined Estrela da Amadora on loan for the 2024–25 season in the Primeira Liga. He made his senior and professional debut with Estrela da Amadora in a 2–2 Primeira Liga tie with Boavista on 16 September 2024.

== International career ==
Travassos is a youth international for Portugal, having been called up to the Portugal U20s for a set of 2022–23 Under 20 Elite League matches in March 2023.

== Career statistics ==
As of match played 29 October 2026

Appearances and goals by club, season and competition
Club	Season	League			National cup		League cup		Europe		Total	
Club	Season	Division	Apps	Goals	Apps	Goals	Apps	Goals	Apps	Goals	Apps	Goals
Sporting CP B	2021–22	Liga 3	2	0	—		—		—		2	0
Sporting CP B	2022–23	Liga 3	19	0	—		—		—		19	0
Sporting CP B	2023–24	Liga 3	3	0	—		—		—		3	0
Sporting CP B	2024–25	Liga 3	3	1	—		—		—		3	1
Sporting CP B	Total		27	1	—		—		—		27	1
Sporting CP	2024–25	Primeira Liga	0	0	0	0	0	0	0	0	0	0
Estrela da Amadora (loan)	2024–25	Primeira Liga	24	1	2	0	—		—		26	1
Moreirense (loan)	2025–26	Primeira Liga	29	5	1	0	—		—		30	5
Braga	2026–27	Primeira Liga	5	0	0	0	1	0	6 (Note: Appearances in UEFA Conference League)	0	12	0
Career total			85	7	3	0	1	0	6	0	95	7
