= Paulo Moreira =

Portuguese footballer (born 2000)

Personal information
- Full name: Paulo Daniel Valente Moreira
- Date of birth: 17 February 2000 (age 26)
- Place of birth: Marco de Canaveses, Portugal
- Height: 1.78 m (5 ft 10 in)
- Position: Midfielder

Team information
- Current team: Famalicão
- Number: 19

Youth career
- 2009–2011: Marco
- 2011–2019: Porto
- 2015–2016: → Padroense (loan)

Senior career*
Years	Team	Apps	(Gls)
2019–2020	Águeda	22	(1)
2020–2024	Varzim	47	(4)
2021	→ Castelo Branco (loan)	11	(0)
2021–2022	→ Felgueiras 1932 (loan)	26	(1)
2024–2026	Estrela da Amadora	55	(4)
2026–	Famalicão	3	(0)

International career
2015	Portugal U15	2	(0)
2015–2016	Portugal U16	11	(0)
2016	Portugal U17	5	(0)
- * Club domestic league appearances and goals as of 5 September 2026

Paulo Daniel Valente Moreira (born 17 February 2000) is a Portuguese professional footballer who plays for as a midfielder for Primeira Liga club Famalicão.

== Club career ==
Paulo Moreira made his debut for Varzim on 8 November 2020 in the Liga Portugal 2.

On 29 July 2021, Varzim sent Moreira on a season-long loan to Liga 3 club Felgueiras 1932.
