= Gabriel de Morais =

Brazilian footballer (born 2002)

Personal information
- Date of birth: 6 March 2002 (age 24)
- Place of birth: Maringá, Brazil
- Height: 1.91 m (6 ft 3 in)
- Position: Forward

Team information
- Current team: Santa Clara

Youth career
- 2015: Inter de Limeira
- 2016–2020: Athletico Paranaense
- 2020–2021: Alverca
- 2023–2024: Santa Clara

Senior career*
Years	Team	Apps	(Gls)
2021–2023	Alverca	1	(0)
2021	→ North Texas SC (loan)	11	(1)
2024–	Santa Clara	0	(0)
2024	→ 1º Dezembro (loan)	22	(4)
2025	→ Académica (loan)	13	(1)
- * Club domestic league appearances and goals as of 1 July 2025

Gabriel de Morais (born 6 March 2002) is a Brazilian footballer who plays for Portuguese club Santa Clara.

== Career ==
De Morais played with the Athletico Paranaense between 2016 and 2020, helping Paranaense win the U-15 Championship in 2017. In 2020, he then move to Portugal, joining Alverca. He made his Campeonato de Portugal debut on 25 April 2021.

On 5 August 2021, de Morais joined USL League One side North Texas SC on loan for the remainder of 2021 and the 2022 season.
