= Manuel Keliano =

Angolan footballer (born 2003)

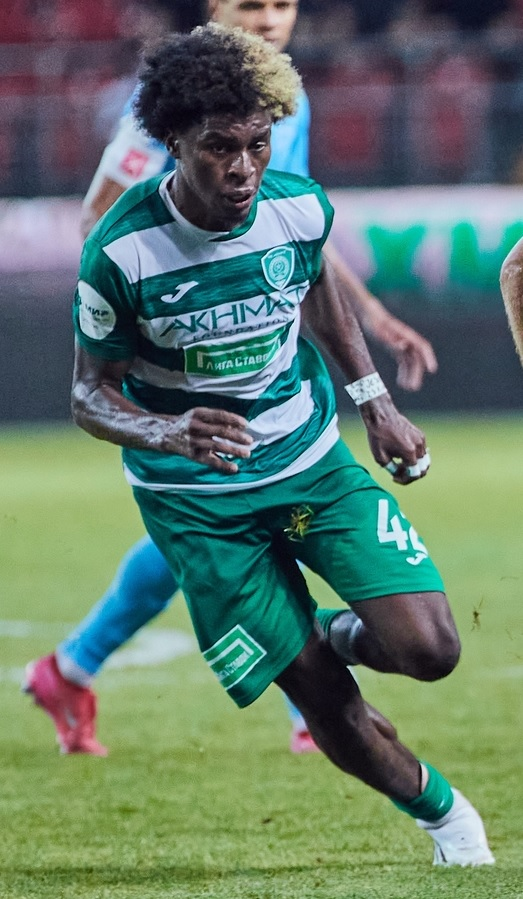
- Keliano with Akhmat Grozny in 2025

Personal information
- Date of birth: 16 January 2003 (age 23)
- Place of birth: Luanda, Angola
- Height: 1.85 m (6 ft 1 in)
- Position: Defensive midfielder

Team information
- Current team: Akhmat Grozny
- Number: 42

Youth career
- Primeiro de Agosto

Senior career*
Years	Team	Apps	(Gls)
2022–2023	Primeiro de Agosto	24	(2)
2023–2025	Estrela da Amadora	30	(0)
2025–	Akhmat Grozny	33	(2)

International career^{‡}
2023–	Angola	27	(3)
Medal record
Men's football
Representing Angola
COSAFA Cup
Winner	2024 South Africa
Winner	2025 South Africa
- * Club domestic league appearances and goals as of 21 November 2026 ‡ National team caps and goals as of 17 November 2026

Manuel Keliano (born 16 January 2003) is an Angolan professional footballer who plays as a defensive midfielder for Russian club Akhmat Grozny and the Angola national team.

== Club career ==
Keliano began his senior career with the Angolan club Primeiro de Agosto in 2022, making 32 appearances and scoring 2 goals in all competitions in his debut season and helped them come in second at the Girabola. On 19 July 2023, Keliano moved to the Portuguese club Estrela da Amadora in the Primeira Liga, on a contract until 2026. He made his professional debut with Estrela da Amadora in a 2–0 Primeira Liga loss to Benfica on 19 August 2023.

On 5 July 2025, Keliano signed a four-year contract with Russian Premier League club Akhmat Grozny.

== International career ==
Keliano was called up to the Angola national team for the 2022 African Nations Championship.

In January 2024, he was selected to take part in the 2023 Africa Cup of Nations, held in Ivory Coast. Angola finished first in their group, which included Riyad Mahrez's Algeria and Edmond Tapsoba's Burkina Faso.

On 3 December 2025, Keliano was called up to the Angola squad for the 2025 Africa Cup of Nations.

== Honours ==
Angola

- COSAFA Cup: 2024, 2025

== Career statistics ==
As of 21 November 2026

Club	Season	League			Cup		Continental		Total	
Club	Season	Division	Apps	Goals	Apps	Goals	Apps	Goals	Apps	Goals
Primeiro de Agosto	2022–23	Girabola	24	2	2	0	6 (Note: Four appearances in CAF Champions League, two appearances in CAF Confederation Cup)	0	32	2
Estrela da Amadora	2023–24	Primeira Liga	9	0	2	0	–		11	0
Estrela da Amadora	2024–25	Primeira Liga	21	0	1	0	–		22	0
Estrela da Amadora	Total		30	0	3	0	0	0	33	0
Akhmat Grozny	2025–26	Russian Premier League	23	1	5	1	–		28	2
Akhmat Grozny	2026–27	Russian Premier League	10	1	3	0	–		13	1
Akhmat Grozny	Total		33	2	8	1	0	0	41	3
Career total			87	4	13	1	6	0	106	5

=== International ===
As of matches played on 17 November 2026

Appearances and goals by national team and year
National team	Year	Apps	Goals
Angola	2023	5	0
Angola	2024	10	2
Angola	2025	6	0
Angola	2026	6	1
Total		27	3

Scores and results list Angola goal tally first, score column indicates score after each Keliano goal

List of international goals scored by Manuel Keliano
No.	Date	Venue	Opponent	Score	Result	Competition
1	5 July 2024	Nelson Mandela Bay Stadium, Gqeberha , South Africa	Comoros	1-0	2-1	2024 COSAFA Cup
2	7 July 2024	Nelson Mandela Bay Stadium, Gqeberha, South Africa	Namibia	5-0	5-0	2024 COSAFA Cup
3	5 June 2026	Larbi Zaouli Stadium, Casablanca, Morocco	Mauritania	1–0	1–1	Friendly
