= Marko Gudžulić =

Serbian footballer (born 2002)

Personal information
- Date of birth: 5 July 2002 (age 24)
- Place of birth: Kruševac, Serbia and Montenegro
- Height: 1.96 m (6 ft 5 in)
- Position: Goalkeeper

Team information
- Current team: Chaves
- Number: 23

Youth career
- FK Kopernikus
- 2017–2018: FK Teleoptik
- 2018–2019: FK Partizan
- 2019–2021: OFK Beograd

Senior career*
| Years | Team | Apps | (Gls) |
| 2021 | FK Zemun | 16 | (0) |
| 2021–2022 | FK Budućnost Dobanovci | 5 | (0) |
| 2022–2024 | FK Kolubara | 0 | (0) |
| 2024 | FK Voždovac | 8 | (0) |
| 2024–2025 | Estrela da Amadora | 2 | (0) |
| 2025– | Chaves | 15 | (0) |
- * Club domestic league appearances and goals as of 20 June 2026

Marko Gudžulić (Serbian Cyrillic: Марко Гуџулић; born 5 July 2002) is a Serbian professional footballer who plays as a goalkeeper for Liga Portugal 2 club Chaves.

== Career ==
Gudžulić is a youth product of the academies of FK Kopernikus, FK Teleoptik, FK Partizan and OFK Beograd. In January 2021, he transferred to FK Zemun and began his professional career in the Serbian First League. A few months later, he transferred to FK Budućnost Dobanovci in the same division. In 2022, he transferred to FK Kolubara in the Serbian first division, the Serbian SuperLiga where he was the backup goalkeeper. On 8 February 2024, he moved to FK Voždovac for the second half of the 2023–24 season,. He made 9 appearances with them, earning interest from abroad.

On 15 June 2024, Gudžulić transferred to Estrela da Amadora in the Primeira Liga on a three-year contract. One year later, he dropped down to Liga Portugal 2, joining Chaves on a two-year deal.
