= Nílton (footballer, born December 1987) =

Brazilian footballer

Personal information
- Full name: Nílton de Oliveira Silva
- Date of birth: December 23, 1987 (age 38)
- Place of birth: Rio de Janeiro, Brazil
- Height: 1.94 m (6 ft 4 in)
- Position: Centre back

Team information
- Current team: America-RJ

Youth career
- –2007: Flamengo

Senior career*
Years	Team	Apps	(Gls)
2007–2009	Flamengo	?	(?)
2007	→ Tupi (loan)	?	(?)
2008	→ América-RJ (loan)	?	(?)
2009	Rio Branco	?	(?)
2010	Wilstermann	34	(4)
2011–	América-RJ		
- * Club domestic league appearances and goals

Nílton de Oliveira Silva or simply Nílton (born December 23, 1987, in Rio de Janeiro), is a Brazilian central back. He currently plays for América do Rio de Janeiro.

== Career ==
The player is a tall center-back who started his career at the youth academies of Flamengo. He was, however, moved from the club without playing an official match for the team.

From a young age in Estádio da Gávea, Nilton was well known, especially for his height of 1.94 metres (6 ft 4 in).

Arising from the generation born in 1987 and Thiago Sales and Rômulo, Niltão won several titles while he served the youth team's Most Wanted from Brazil, however, had no opportunities to repeat the story from the professionals.

Was loaned to Tupi in 2007 to gain experience, and was that club for about six months. On his return, the player who had left the Estádio da Gávea when the team was headed by Ney Franco, found it Joel Santana that there had miraculously led the team will Copa Libertadores and hit the back four definitely formed by Ronaldo Angelim and Captain Fábio Luciano, it would still be double reinforced in early 2008 by Rodrigo.

Thus, Niltão once again did not find good opportunities, and eventually borrowed again, now for the America. While serving at Mequinha, the central back ended up living a rather complicated phase due to the decline of the red team to the second division of the Campeonato Carioca, so that when he came back to Estádio da Gávea later that year, the athlete even been linked by the then coach Caio Júnior.

Fulfill the contract with Flamengo until May 2009, always training separately, and the end of the commitment to Brazil's Most Wanted, Niltão been without a club until August of that year, when hit with the team from the Rio Branco. Later, in 2010, the defender headed to Bolivia, in order to play for the Wilstermann. There Niltão finally had success including being responsible for the goal of the conquest of Torneo Apertura 2010.

== Honours ==
- Wilstermann
  - Torneio Apertura: 2010

== Contract ==
- Flamengo 1 June 2007 to 30 May 2009.
- Tupi (Loan) 11 June 2007 to 2 December 2007.
