= Bernardo Fontes =

Brazilian footballer

Personal information
- Full name: Bernardo Caltabiano Parise Fontes
- Date of birth: July 23, 2002 (age 24)
- Place of birth: Rio de Janeiro, Brazil
- Height: 1.96 m (6 ft 5 in)
- Position: Goalkeeper

Team information
- Current team: Braga
- Number: 31

Youth career
- Vasco da Gama
- União
- 2013–2020: Flamengo
- 2020–2021: Braga

Senior career*
Years	Team	Apps	(Gls)
2021–2024	Braga B	53	(0)
2024–2026	Tondela	68	(0)
2026–	Braga	9	(0)
- * Club domestic league appearances and goals as of 22:00, 25 October 2026 (UTC)

Bernardo Caltabiano Parise Fontes (born 23 July 2002), sometimes known as just Bernardo, is a Brazilian footballer who plays as a goalkeeper for Braga in the Primeira Liga.

== Club career ==
Originally an outfield player for the academy of Vasco da Gama, Bernardo moved to União where he first filled in as goalkeeper as an emergecny. He moved to Flamengo where he climbed up their youth categories. He moved to Braga's U19s in 2020 where he finished his development. He was promoted to Braga's reserves in 2021, and on 23 April 2022 signed his first professional contract with the club until 2026. On 26 July 2024, he transferred to Liga Portugal 2 club Tondela for 3 seasons. In his debut season he helped Tondela get promoted, and was named the award for best goalkeeper in the league that season. On 13 August 2025, he extended his contract with Tondela until 2029. On 23 June 2026, Braga triggered a buyback option and Bernardo returned on a contract until 2030.

== Personal life ==
In addition to his Brazilian nationality, Bernardo also holds Italian citizenship.

== Career statistics ==
As of match played 8 November 2026

Appearances and goals by club, season and competition
Club	Season	League			Cup		League Cup		Europe		Total	
Club	Season	Division	Apps	Goals	Apps	Goals	Apps	Goals	Apps	Goals	Apps	Goals
Braga B	2021–22	Liga 3	1	0	—		—		—		1	0
Braga B	2022–23	Liga 3	21	0	—		—		—		21	0
Braga B	2023–24	Liga 3	31	0	—		—		—		31	0
Braga B	Total		53	0	—		—		—		53	0
Tondela	2024–25	Liga Portugal 2	34	0	—		—		—		34	0
Tondela	2025–26	Primeira Liga	34	0	—		—		—		34	0
Tondela	Total		68	0	—		—		—		68	0
Braga	2026–27	Primeira Liga	11	0	0	0	1	0	8 (Note: Appearances in UEFA Conference League)	0	20	0
Career total			132	0	0	0	1	0	8	0	141	0

== Honours ==
Tondela

- Liga Portugal 2: 2024–25

Individual

- 2024–25 Liga Portugal 2 Goalkeeper of the Season
