= Gabri Martínez =

Spanish footballer (born 2003)

Personal information
- Full name: Gabriel Martínez Aguilera
- Date of birth: 22 January 2003 (age 23)
- Place of birth: Sant Fost de Campsentelles, Spain
- Height: 1.85 m (6 ft 1 in)
- Position: Forward

Team information
- Current team: Braga
- Number: 77

Youth career
- Martorelles
- 2012–2016: Barcelona
- 2016–2018: Damm
- 2018–2021: Girona

Senior career*
Years	Team	Apps	(Gls)
2021–2022	Girona B	24	(1)
2021–2024	Girona	7	(0)
2022–2023	→ San Fernando (loan)	36	(5)
2023–2024	→ Mirandés (loan)	41	(9)
2024–	Braga	63	(5)

International career
2022	Spain U19	1	(0)
- * Club domestic league appearances and goals as of 25 October 2026

Gabriel "Gabri" Martínez Aguilera (born 22 January 2003) is a Spanish professional footballer who plays as a forward for Primeira Liga club Braga.

== Club career ==
Born in Sant Fost de Campsentelles, Barcelona, Catalonia, Martínez joined Barcelona's La Masia in 2012, from CF Martorelles. After leaving Barça in 2016, he played for two years for Damm, before finishing his formation with Girona.

Martínez made his senior debut with the reserves on 10 January 2021, playing the last 19 minutes of a 0–0 Tercera División home draw against Cerdanyola del Vallès. He made his first team debut on 22 August, coming on as a second-half substitute for fellow youth graduate Gerard Gumbau in a 0–0 home draw against Las Palmas in the Segunda División championship.

On 13 July 2022, Martínez was loaned to Primera Federación side San Fernando for the season. On 30 June of the following year, he moved to second division side Mirandés also in a temporary one-year deal.

Martínez scored his first professional goal on 14 August 2023, netting Mirandés' third in a 4–0 home routing of Alcorcón. A regular starter, he contributed with nine goals in 41 appearances during the campaign.

On 28 June 2024, Martínez moved abroad for the first time in his career, after signing a five-year contract with Portuguese Primeira Liga side Braga.

== Career statistics ==
As of match played 29 October 2026

Appearances and goals by club, season and competition
Club	Season	League			National Cup		League Cup		Europe		Other		Total	
Club	Season	Division	Apps	Goals	Apps	Goals	Apps	Goals	Apps	Goals	Apps	Goals	Apps	Goals
Girona B	2020–21	Tercera Federación	3	0	—		—		—		—		3	0
Girona B	2021–22	Tercera Federación	21	1	—		—		—		2 (Note: Appearances in Promotion Playoffs)	0	23	1
Girona B	Total		24	1	—		—		—		2	0	26	1
Girona	2021–22	Segunda División	7	0	1	0	—		—		—		8	0
San Fernando (loan)	2022–23	Primera Federación	36	5	0	0	—		—		—		36	5
Mirandés (loan)	2023–24	Segunda División	41	9	0	0	—		—		—		41	9
Braga	2024–25	Primeira Liga	30	4	4	0	2	0	11 (Note: Appearances in UEFA Europa League)	0	—		47	4
Braga	2025–26	Primeira Liga	27	0	3	0	2	0	14	5	—		46	5
Braga	2026–27	Primeira Liga	6	1	1	0	0	0	4 (Note: Appearances in UEFA Conference League)	1	—		11	2
Braga	Total		63	5	8	0	4	0	29	6	—		104	11
Career total			171	20	9	0	4	0	29	6	2	0	215	26
