= Igor Jesus (footballer, born 2003) =

Brazilian footballer (born 2003)

- Jesus with Los Angeles FC in 2026

Personal information
- Full name: Igor Jesus Lima
- Date of birth: 7 March 2003 (age 23)
- Place of birth: Goiânia, Brazil
- Height: 1.78 m (5 ft 10 in)
- Position: Defensive midfielder

Team information
- Current team: Los Angeles FC
- Number: 6

Youth career
- 2020: Goiás
- 2021–2023: Flamengo

Senior career*
Years	Team	Apps	(Gls)
2022–2024	Flamengo	25	(0)
2024–2025	Estrela da Amadora	13	(0)
2025–	Los Angeles FC	32	(0)

International career
2023	Brazil U23	5	(0)
Medal record
Men's football
Representing Brazil
Pan American Games
Winner	2023 Santiago
- * Club domestic league appearances and goals as of 11:16, 6 November 2026 (UTC)

Igor Jesus Lima (born 7 March 2003) is a Brazilian footballer who plays as a defensive midfielder for Los Angeles FC in Major League Soccer.

== Career ==
=== Flamengo ===
Igor Jesus made his debut on 26 January 2022, starting for Flamengo in the Campeonato Carioca 2–1 home win against Portuguesa (RJ).

=== Estrela da Amadora ===
On 30 August 2024, Jesus moved to Primeira Liga club Estrela da Amadora on a €2.0m transfer fee.

=== Los Angeles Football Club ===
On 21 January 2025, Igor Jesus moved from Estrela da Amadora to Los Angeles Football Club for a €4.0m transfer fee.

=== International ===
Igor Jesus has made 5 appearances for the Brazilian U23 team.

== Career statistics ==
As of 21 January 2025

Appearances and goals by club, season and competition
Club	Season	League			State League		Cup		Continental		Other		Total	
Club	Season	Division	Apps	Goals	Apps	Goals	Apps	Goals	Apps	Goals	Apps	Goals	Apps	Goals
Flamengo	2022	Série A	3	0	2 (Note: Appearance(s) in the Campeonato Carioca.)	0	1	0	—		—		6	0
Flamengo	2023	Série A	4	0	5	0	0	0	0	0	0	0	9	0
Flamengo	2024	Série A	3	0	8	0	2	0	3	0	—		7	0
Flamengo	Career total		10	0	15	0	3	0	3	0	0	0	31	0
Estrela da Amadora	2024–25	Primeira Liga	13	0	—		2	0	—		—		15	0
Career total			23	0	15	0	5	0	3	0	0	0	46	0

== Honours ==
Flamengo

- Campeonato Carioca: 2024
