= Leonel Bucca =

Argentine professional footballer

Personal information
- Date of birth: 20 March 1999 (age 27)
- Place of birth: Esperanza, Argentina
- Height: 1.90 m (6 ft 3 in)
- Position: Midfielder

Team information
- Current team: Independiente Rivadavia
- Number: 8

Youth career
- San Lorenzo Esperanza
- 2016–2020: Unión Santa Fe

Senior career*
Years	Team	Apps	(Gls)
2020–2022	Unión Santa Fe	7	(0)
2021	→ Deportivo Riestra (loan)	29	(1)
2023	San Martín Tucumán	29	(3)
2024–2025	Estrela da Amadora	45	(3)
2025–	Independiente Rivadavia	13	(4)
- * Club domestic league appearances and goals as of 16:30, 11 July 2026 (UTC)

Leonel Bucca (born 20 March 1999) is an Argentine professional footballer who plays as a midfielder for Independiente Rivadavia.

== Career ==
Bucca initially came through the ranks at the local side San Lorenzo Esperanza, before moving into the Unión Santa Fe youth system in 2016. In January 2020, Bucca was linked with a move to the United States with second tier team Loudoun United. The move never materialised, with the midfielder later describing it as "nothing concrete". He signed his first professional contract on 28 October 2020, which was followed by his senior debut in a draw at home to Arsenal de Sarandí on 1 November; he featured for seventy-five minutes. He was sent off in his second appearance on 20 November against the same opponents.

After five total matches for Unión, Bucca was loaned to Primera Nacional with Deportivo Riestra on 10 February 2021.

In December 2022, after his contract with Unión Santa Fe expired, Bucca dropped down to the Primera Nacional, joining San Martín de Tucumán. At the end of the 2023 season, his contract expired and he left the club.

On 9 January 2024, Bucca moved to Portugal, signing a two-and-a-half-year contract with Primeira Liga club Estrela da Amadora.

== Personal life ==
On 22 November 2020, it was confirmed that Bucca had tested positive for COVID-19 amid the pandemic.

== Career statistics ==
As of match played 28 October 2023

Appearances and goals by club, season and competition
Club	Season	League			Cup		League cup		Continental		Total	
Club	Season	Division	Apps	Goals	Apps	Goals	Apps	Goals	Apps	Goals	Apps	Goals
Unión Santa Fe	2020–21 (Note: Soccerway counts Copa de la Liga Profesional appearances as league appearances.)	Primera División	0	0	0	0	5	0	—		5	0
Unión Santa Fe	2022	Primera División	7	0	1	0	7	1	1 (Note: Appearance in Copa Sudamericana)	0	16	1
Unión Santa Fe	Total		7	0	1	0	12	1	1	0	21	1
Deportivo Riestra (loan)	2021	Primera Nacional	29	1	0	0	—		—		29	1
San Martín Tucumán	2023	Primera Nacional	29	3	2	0	—		—		31	3
Career total			65	4	3	0	12	1	1	0	81	5

== Honours ==
Independiente Rivadavia

- Copa Argentina: 2025
