= João Marques =

Portuguese footballer (born 2002)

Personal information
- Full name: João Miguel Vieira Freitas Silva Marques
- Date of birth: 13 February 2002 (age 24)
- Place of birth: Barreiro, Portugal
- Height: 1.79 m (5 ft 10 in)
- Positions: Winger; attacking midfielder

Team information
- Current team: Torreense (on loan from Braga)
- Number: 33

Youth career
- 2010–2014: Sporting CP
- 2014–2018: Barreirense
- 2018–2020: Vitória Setúbal

Senior career*
Years	Team	Apps	(Gls)
2020–2021	Vitória Setúbal	21	(0)
2022–2024	Estoril	43	(5)
2024–	Braga	3	(0)
2025	→ Gil Vicente (loan)	11	(0)
2026	→ Casa Pia (loan)	13	(1)
2026–	→ Torreense (loan)	1	(0)

International career
2023–2025	Portugal U21	13	(1)
- * Club domestic league appearances and goals as of 5 September 2026

João Miguel Vieira Freitas Silva Marques (born 13 February 2002) is a Portuguese professional footballer who plays as a winger or attacking midfielder for Liga Portugal 2 club Torreense on loan from Braga.

== Professional career ==
Marques is a youth product of Sporting CP, Barreirense and Vitória Setúbal. He began his senior career with Vitória Setúbal in the Portuguese third division in 2020. In the summer of 2021, he transferred to the Primeira Liga club Estoril. On 10 April 2023, he extended his contract with Estoril until 2026. He made his professional debut with them in a 0–0 Taça da Liga tie with Tondela on 19 November 2022.

On 1 February 2024, fellow Primeira Liga side Braga announced that an agreement had been reached with Estoril for the signing of Marques for a transfer fee of €3.5 million, which could rise to €4.5 million with add-ons, and a 10% sell-on fee. Marques joined Braga at the start of the 2024–25 season, signing a five-year contract; his release clause was set at €30 million.

On 4 January 2025, Marques was loaned by Gil Vicente. On 29 January 2026, Braga sent Marques on loan to fellow Primeira Liga side Casa Pia until the end of the 2025–26 season. On 1 September 2026, Marques went on a new loan to Torreense in Liga Portugal 2.

== International career ==
Marques is a youth international for Portugal, having played for the Portugal U21s for a set of 2025 UEFA European Under-21 Championship qualification matches in September 2023.

== Career statistics ==
As of match played 29 May 2026

Appearances and goals by club, season and competition
Club	Season	League			Taça de Portugal		Taça da Liga		Continental		Other		Total	
Club	Season	Division	Apps	Goals	Apps	Goals	Apps	Goals	Apps	Goals	Apps	Goals	Apps	Goals
Vitória Setúbal	2020–21	Campeonato de Portugal	21	0	0	0	—		—		—		21	0
Estoril	2022–23	Primeira Liga	11	0	0	0	3	0	—		—		14	0
Estoril	2023–24	Primeira Liga	32	5	3	0	6	1	—		—		41	6
Estoril	Total		43	5	3	0	9	1	—		—		55	6
Braga	2024–25	Primeira Liga	3	0	0	0	0	0	3 (Note: Appearance(s) in UEFA Europa League)	0	—		6	0
Braga	2025–26	Primeira Liga	0	0	0	0	0	0	1	0	—		1	0
Braga	2026–27	Primeira Liga	0	0	0	0	0	0	0	0	—		0	0
Braga	Total		3	0	0	0	0	0	4	0	—		7	0
Gil Vicente (loan)	2024–25	Primeira Liga	11	0	1	0	—		—		—		12	0
Casa Pia (loan)	2025–26	Primeira Liga	13	1	—		—		—		2 (Note: Appearances in Primeira Liga play-offs)	0	15	1
Career total			91	6	4	0	9	1	4	0	2	0	110	7
