= Nilton Varela =

Portuguese footballer (born 2001)

Personal information
- Full name: Nilton Varela Lopes
- Date of birth: 25 May 2001 (age 25)
- Place of birth: Lisbon, Portugal
- Height: 1.82 m (6 ft 0 in)
- Positions: Left-back; winger

Team information
- Current team: Marítimo
- Number: 5

Youth career
- 2009–2012: Sporting
- 2012–2016: Belenenses
- 2016–2017: Sporting
- 2017–2019: Belenenses
- 2019: B-SAD

Senior career*
Years	Team	Apps	(Gls)
2019–2022	B-SAD	42	(2)
2022–2024	Porto B	39	(3)
2024–2025	Estrela da Amadora	41	(0)
2026	Beerschot	8	(0)
2026–	Marítimo	2	(0)

International career
2019	Cape Verde U19	2	(0)
2020	Portugal U19	1	(0)
- * Club domestic league appearances and goals as of 5 September 2026

Nilton Varela Lopes (born 25 May 2001) is a Portuguese professional footballer who plays as a left-back or winger for Primeira Liga club Marítimo.

== Club career ==
Varela alternated between Lisbon-based clubs Sporting CP and C.F. Os Belenenses in his youth. He made his professional debut with Belenenses SAD in a 2–0 Primeira Liga loss away to Sporting on 10 November 2019. The following 26 January, he scored his first goal in a 2–1 home win over Portimonense SC, with his uncle scoring the other. He was a regular in the second half of the season as Petit replaced Pedro Ribeiro as manager, earning his place from unrelated Spaniard Francisco Varela.

In March 2022, Portugal's Constitutional Court ordered B-SAD to pay over €30,000 in compensation to C.F. Os Belenenses for his development as a player.

Varela transferred to FC Porto B on 19 August 2022, on a two-year deal.

On 30 January 2024, Varela returned to the Primeira Liga, joining Estrela da Amadora. At the beginning of the 2025–26 season, he terminated his contract, leaving the club.

On 26 January 2026, after over six months as a free agent, Varela moved to Belgium, joining Challenger Pro League club Beerschot on a contract until June 2028.

On 26 August 2026, Varela returned to Portugal and signed a two-season contract with Marítimo.

== International career ==
Born in Portugal, Varela is of Cape Verdean descent. He represented the Cape Verde under-19 teams in a friendly 2–0 loss to the Portuguese equivalent on 30 January 2019. He then switched to represent the latter, making an appearance in a 3–1 win over France under-19 on 25 February 2020.

== Personal life ==
Varela made his professional debut for Belenenses SAD alongside his uncle Silvestre Varela, a winger who played mainly for FC Porto and was a long-time international for Portugal. He was also his teammate at Porto B.
