= Kiki (footballer, born 1961) =

Cape Verdean association football player

Personal information
- Full name: Alcides Rodrigues Tavares
- Date of birth: 28 October 1961 (age 65)
- Place of birth: Praia, Cape Verde
- Position: Midfielder

Senior career*
Years	Team	Apps	(Gls)
–1984	Vitória de Guimarães	10	(1)
1984–1987	Chaves	37	(0)
1987–1989	Braga	71	(1)
1989–1992	Porto	55	(1)
1992–1993	Braga	14	(0)
1993–1994	Paços de Ferreira	17	(0)

International career
- Cape Verde
- * Club domestic league appearances and goals

Alcides Rodrigues Tavares (born 28 October 1961) is a Cape Verdean football former footballer who last played as a midfielder for Paços de Ferreira.

== Career ==
Kiki started his career with Portuguese side Vitória de Guimarães.

== Style of play ==
Kiki mainly operated as a midfielder and was known for his strength and technical ability.

== Post-playing career ==
After retiring from professional football, Kiki worked as a businessman in the construction and food industries.

== Personal life ==
Kiki is the father of Portuguese rapper 3000Kilo.
