= Samuel Soares =

Portuguese footballer

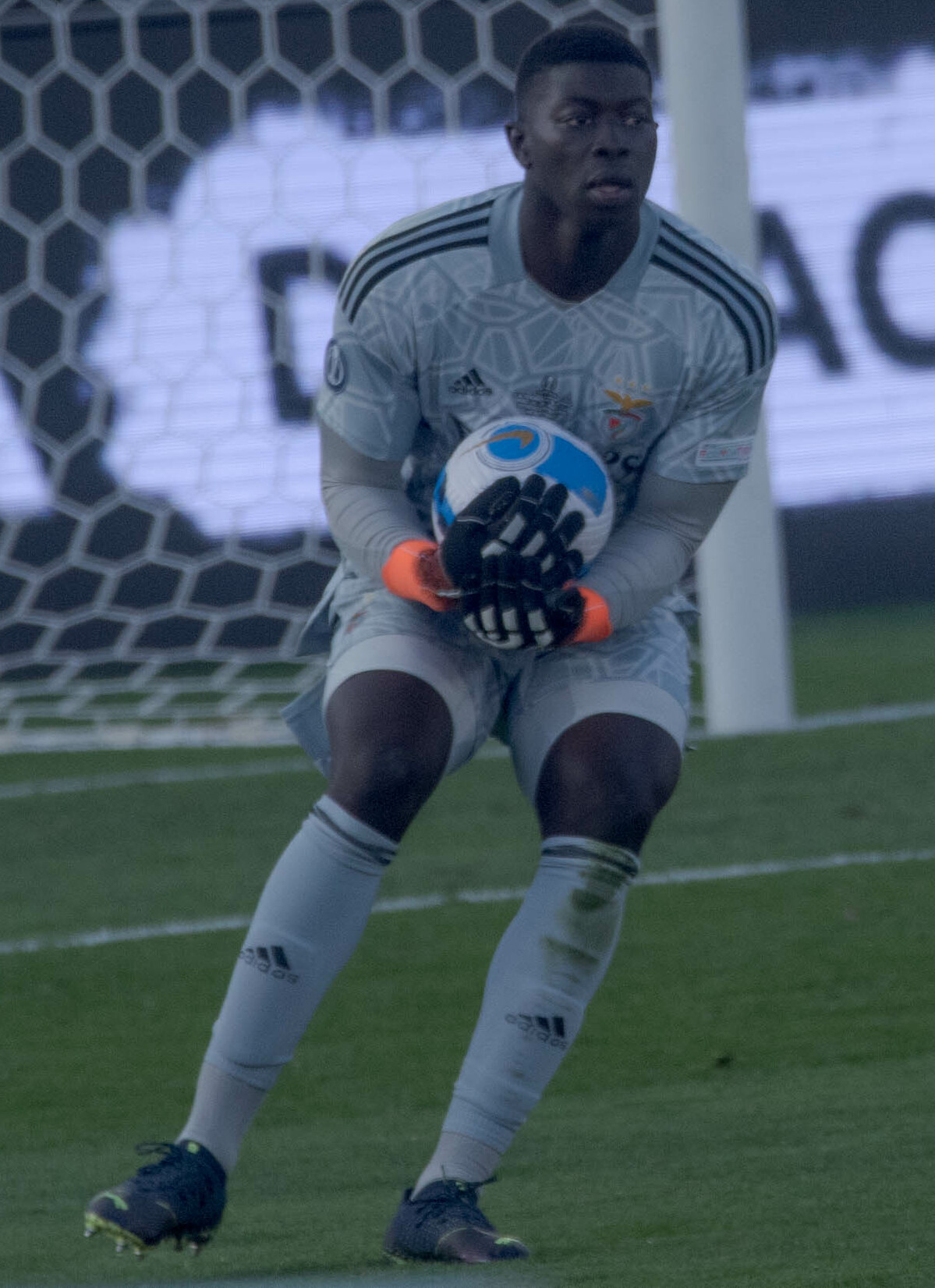
- Soares playing for Benfica at the Under-20 Intercontinental Cup

Personal information
- Full name: Samuel Jumpe Soares
- Date of birth: 15 June 2002 (age 24)
- Place of birth: Amadora, Portugal
- Height: 1.90 m (6 ft 3 in)
- Position: Goalkeeper

Team information
- Current team: Benfica
- Number: 24

Youth career
- 2011–2013: Tires
- 2013–2022: Benfica

Senior career*
Years	Team	Apps	(Gls)
2021–2023	Benfica B	32	(1)
2022–	Benfica	21	(0)

International career^{‡}
2017	Portugal U15	2	(0)
2018	Portugal U16	2	(0)
2018–2019	Portugal U17	12	(0)
2019–2020	Portugal U19	5	(0)
2021	Portugal U20	3	(0)
2022–	Portugal U21	17	(0)
- * Club domestic league appearances and goals as of 23:36, 8 November 2026 (UTC) ‡ National team caps and goals as of 22:00, 21 June 2025 (UTC)

Samuel Jumpe Soares (born 15 June 2002) is a Portuguese professional footballer who plays as a goalkeeper for Primeira Liga club Benfica.

== Club career ==
=== Benfica ===
Born in Amadora, Soares began his youth career with hometown club União de Tires, before moving to his boyhood club Benfica's youth academy in 2013. He signed a professional contract with the club on 6 October 2022, tying him to the club until 2027.

Soares played a major role in the 2021–22 UEFA Youth League, where Benfica U19 topped their group against Dynamo Kyiv, Barcelona and Bayern Munich. In the final, Benfica defeated Red Bull Salzburg 6–0 to help Benfica win their first Youth League title, and their first title in European football since the 1961–62 European Cup. He made his professional debut with Benfica B in a 1–1 LigaPro draw to Académico de Viseu on 6 August 2022. On 24 August, Soares kept a clean sheet on Benfica's 1–0 against Peñarol at the 2022 Under-20 Intercontinental Cup.

He made his professional debut with Benfica B in a 5–0 LigaPro win against Nacional on 9 August 2021. In the 2022–23 season, he began training with the first team, and eventually became the club's second choice goalkeeper. He earned a league medal in the 2022–23 campaign, replacing first-choice Odysseas Vlachodimos in the 88th minute of a 3–0 home win over Santa Clara on 27 May. After long-time starting goalkeeper Odysseas Vlachodimos made a series of mistakes in the start of the 2023–24 season, and following a dispute with Benfica manager Roger Schmidt, Schmidt dropped him in favour of Soares, who went on to start three consecutive games, keeping two clean sheets, before losing his place to Anatoliy Trubin, who had recently signed for the club.

== International career ==
Born in Portugal, Soares is of Bissau-Guinean descent. He represented Portugal at under-15, under-16, under-17, under-19 and under-20 levels, for a total of 24 caps. On 4 June 2022, Soares made his under-21 debut, playing the entire 5–1 win over Belarus in the 2023 UEFA European Championship qualifiers.

In June 2023, Soares took part in the 2023 UEFA European Under-21 Championship. Portugal were eliminated from the tournament, on 2 July, after a 1–0 loss to England in the quarter-finals.

== Career statistics ==
=== Club ===
As of match played 8 November 2026

Appearances and goals by club, season and competition
Club	Season	League			Taça de Portugal		Taça da Liga		Europe		Other		Total	
Club	Season	Division	Apps	Goals	Apps	Goals	Apps	Goals	Apps	Goals	Apps	Goals	Apps	Goals
Benfica B	2021–22	Liga Portugal 2	11	0	—		—		—		—		11	0
Benfica B	2022–23	Liga Portugal 2	20	0	—		—		—		—		20	0
Benfica B	2024–25	Liga Portugal 2	1	0	—		—		—		—		1	0
Benfica B	Total		32	0	—		—		—		—		32	0
Benfica	2022–23	Primeira Liga	1	0	0	0	0	0	0	0	—		1	0
Benfica	2023–24	Primeira Liga	5	0	1	0	0	0	0	0	0	0	6	0
Benfica	2024–25	Primeira Liga	2	0	7	0	0	0	0	0	0	0	9	0
Benfica	2025–26	Primeira Liga	2	0	3	0	1	0	0	0	0	0	6	0
Benfica	2026–27	Primeira Liga	11	0	0	0	0	0	4 (Note: Appearances in UEFA Europa League)	0	—		15	0
Benfica	Total		21	0	11	0	1	0	4	0	0	0	37	0
Career total			53	0	11	0	1	0	4	0	0	0	69	0

== Honours ==
Benfica Youth

- UEFA Youth League: 2021–22
- Under-20 Intercontinental Cup: 2022

Benfica

- Primeira Liga: 2022–23
- Taça da Liga: 2024–25
- Supertaça Cândido de Oliveira: 2023, 2025

Individual

- Liga Portugal 2 Goalkeeper of the Month: October/November 2022
