= Anatoliy Trubin =

Ukrainian footballer (born 2001)

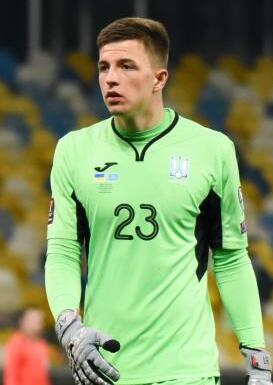
- Trubin playing for Ukraine in 2021

Personal information
- Full name: Anatoliy Volodymyrovych Trubin
- Date of birth: 1 August 2001 (age 25)
- Place of birth: Donetsk, Ukraine
- Height: 1.99 m (6 ft 6 in)
- Position: Goalkeeper

Team information
- Current team: Benfica
- Number: 1

Youth career
- 2013–2014: Azovstal-2 Mariupol
- 2014–2019: Shakhtar Donetsk

Senior career*
Years	Team	Apps	(Gls)
2019–2023	Shakhtar Donetsk	69	(0)
2023–	Benfica	92	(0)

International career^{‡}
2017	Ukraine U16	2	(0)
2017–2018	Ukraine U17	6	(0)
2018	Ukraine U18	1	(0)
2018–2019	Ukraine U19	7	(0)
2019–2023	Ukraine U21	15	(0)
2021–	Ukraine	32	(0)
Medal record
Men's football
Representing Ukraine
UEFA European Under-21 Championship
Bronze medal – third place	2023 Georgia-Romania
- * Club domestic league appearances and goals as of 23:38, 16 May 2026 (UTC) ‡ National team caps and goals as of 15 November 2026

Anatoliy Volodymyrovych Trubin (Ukrainian: Анато́лій Володи́мирович Тру́бін; born 1 August 2001) is a Ukrainian professional footballer who plays as a goalkeeper for Primeira Liga club Benfica and the Ukraine national team.

A product of the Shakhtar Donetsk academy, Trubin made his senior debut in 2019 and established himself as first-choice goalkeeper during the 2020–21 season, featuring prominently in the UEFA Champions League and domestic competitions. He won multiple Ukrainian Premier League titles with Shakhtar before transferring to Benfica in 2023. In Portugal, he became the club’s starting goalkeeper and gained continental attention after scoring a stoppage-time goal in the UEFA Champions League in January 2026.

At international level, Trubin has represented Ukraine from under-16 through senior level and was included in the squads for UEFA Euro 2020 and UEFA Euro 2024.

== Club career ==
=== Shakhtar Donetsk ===
Born in Donetsk, Trubin began his youth career with Azovstal-2 Mariupol before joining the academy of Shakhtar Donetsk in 2014. In February 2019, he started training with the first team and was included in the matchday squad for a UEFA Europa League fixture against Eintracht Frankfurt. He made his professional debut on 26 May 2019, keeping a clean sheet in a 4–0 Ukrainian Premier League win over Mariupol.

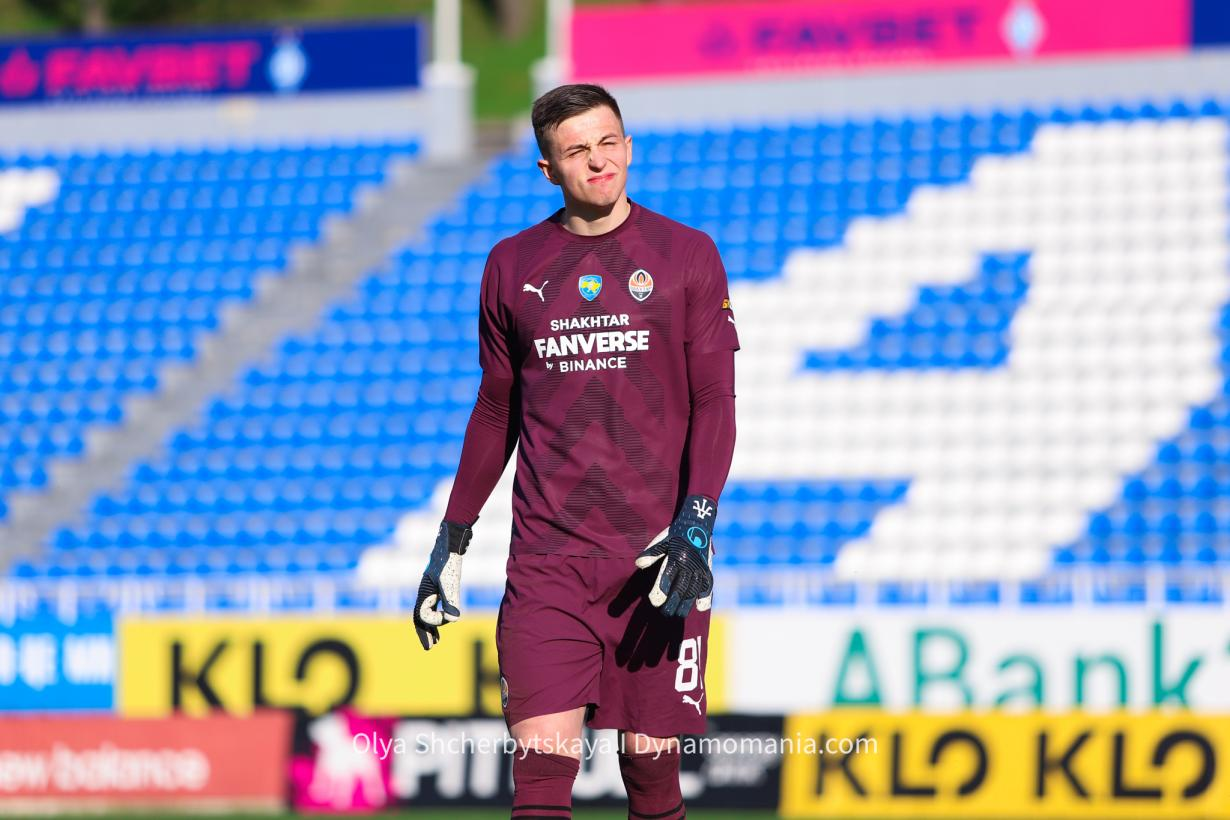
Trubin with Shakhtar Donetsk in 2023

Trubin’s breakthrough came during the 2020–21 season, when he displaced long-time first-choice goalkeeper Andriy Pyatov. He made 30 appearances across competitions and debuted in the UEFA Champions League on 21 October 2020 in a 3–2 away win against Real Madrid. He also recorded two clean sheets against Inter Milan in the group stage and was voted Shakhtar’s player of the season by supporters.

During the 2022–23 season, he made 28 league appearances and kept 14 clean sheets as Shakhtar won the Ukrainian Premier League title. On 23 February 2023, he was named man of the match in a UEFA Europa League knockout round play-off against Rennes after saving three penalties in the shoot-out to send Shakhtar into the round of 16.

With one year remaining on his contract in mid-2023, Shakhtar held transfer talks with Inter Milan, but negotiations collapsed after the clubs failed to agree on a fee. Trubin subsequently expressed his desire to leave, and Benfica entered negotiations shortly afterwards.

=== Benfica ===
On 10 August 2023, Trubin signed for Benfica on a contract running until 2028. The transfer fee was reported as €10 million plus €1 million in performance-related bonuses, with Shakhtar retaining 40% of any future profit on a sale.

He began the season as backup to Samuel Soares following the departure of Odysseas Vlachodimos, before making his debut on 16 September in a 2–1 Primeira Liga away win against Vizela. Head coach Roger Schmidt stated that the delayed introduction allowed Trubin time to adapt and gain confidence within the squad. He subsequently established himself as the club’s first-choice goalkeeper across domestic and European competitions.

On 28 January 2026, Trubin scored a stoppage-time goal in a 4–2 UEFA Champions League victory over Real Madrid, securing Benfica’s progression to the knockout play-offs on goal difference. He became the fifth goalkeeper to score in Champions League history and the first since 2023 and the first goalkeeper to score for Benfica in official matches. It was also the first goal of his career.

== International career ==
Trubin represented Ukraine at under-16, under-17, under-18, under-19 and under-21 levels, for a total of 31 caps. He was called up to the senior side by Andrey Shevchenko on 5 March 2021, for 2022 FIFA World Cup qualifiers against France, Finland and Kazakhstan.

He made his senior debut for Ukraine national team on 31 March in a World Cup qualifier against Kazakhstan. Trubin was included in the squad for Euro 2020. After finishing as one of the best third-placed teams, Ukraine was eventually eliminated in the quarter-finals by England on 3 July, after a 4–0 loss at Stadio Olimpico in Rome.

In May 2024, Trubin was called up to represent Ukraine at UEFA Euro 2024.

== Career statistics ==
=== Club ===
As of match played 5 November 2026

Appearances and goals by club, season and competition
Club	Season	League			National cup (Note: Includes Taça de Portugal)		League cup (Note: Includes Taça da Liga)		Europe		Other		Total	
Club	Season	Division	Apps	Goals	Apps	Goals	Apps	Goals	Apps	Goals	Apps	Goals	Apps	Goals
Shakhtar Donetsk	2018–19	Ukrainian Premier League	1	0	0	0	—		0	0	0	0	1	0
Shakhtar Donetsk	2019–20	Ukrainian Premier League	7	0	0	0	—		0	0	0	0	7	0
Shakhtar Donetsk	2020–21	Ukrainian Premier League	21	0	0	0	—		9 (Note: Five appearances in UEFA Champions League, four appearances in UEFA Europa League)	0	0	0	30	0
Shakhtar Donetsk	2021–22	Ukrainian Premier League	12	0	0	0	—		6 (Note: Appearances in UEFA Champions League)	0	0	0	18	0
Shakhtar Donetsk	2022–23	Ukrainian Premier League	28	0	—		—		10 (Note: Six appearances in UEFA Champions League, four appearances in UEFA Europa League)	0	—		38	0
Shakhtar Donetsk	Total		69	0	0	0	—		25	0	0	0	94	0
Benfica	2023–24	Primeira Liga	28	0	5	0	3	0	12 (Note: Six appearances in UEFA Champions League, six appearances in UEFA Europa League)	0	—		48	0
Benfica	2024–25	Primeira Liga	32	0	0	0	3	0	12	0	4 (Note: Appearances in FIFA Club World Cup)	0	51	0
Benfica	2025–26	Primeira Liga	32	0	2	0	1	0	14	1	1 (Note: Appearance in Supertaça Cândido de Oliveira)	0	50	1
Benfica	2026–27	Primeira Liga	0	0	0	0	1	0	6 (Note: Appearances in UEFA Europa League)	0	—		7	0
Benfica	Total		92	0	7	0	8	0	44	1	5	0	156	1
Career total			161	0	7	0	8	0	69	1	5	0	250	1

=== International ===
As of match played 14 November 2026

Appearances and goals by national team and year
National team	Year	Apps	Goals
Ukraine	2021	2	0
Ukraine	2022	1	0
Ukraine	2023	7	0
Ukraine	2024	9	0
Ukraine	2025	7	0
Ukraine	2026	6	0
Total		32	0

== Honours ==
Shakhtar Donetsk

- Ukrainian Premier League: 2018–19, 2019–20, 2022–23
- Ukrainian Cup: 2018–19

Benfica

- Taça da Liga: 2024–25
- Supertaça Cândido de Oliveira: 2025

Individual

- Ukrainian Premier League Goalkeeper of the Year: 2021–22, 2022–23
- UEFA Champions League Breakthrough XI: 2020
- Shakhtar Donetsk Player of the Year: 2020
- IFFHS Men's Youth (U20) World Team: 2021

== See also ==
- List of goalscoring goalkeepers
