= 2023–24 S.L. Benfica season =

Benfica
2023–24 season
- President: Rui Costa
- Head coach: Roger Schmidt
- Stadium: Estádio da Luz
- Primeira Liga: 2nd
- Taça de Portugal: Semi-finals
- Taça da Liga: Semi-finals
- Supertaça Cândido de Oliveira: Winners
- UEFA Champions League: Group stage
- UEFA Europa League: Quarter-finals
- Top goalscorer: League: Rafa Silva (14); All: Rafa Silva (22)
- Highest home attendance: 62,247 v Porto (29 September 2023)
- Lowest home attendance: 48,959 v AVS (21 December 2023)
- Average home league attendance: 56,248 (17 matches)
- Biggest win: Benfica 4–0 Vitória Guimarães (2 September 2023)
- Biggest defeat: Porto 5–0 Benfica (3 March 2024)
Home colours	Away colours	Third colours

The 2023–24 Sport Lisboa e Benfica season was the club's 120th season in existence and its 90th consecutive season in the top flight of Portuguese football.

Domestically, Benfica played in the Primeira Liga as defending champions, and reached the semi-finals of the Taça da Liga and Taça de Portugal. In Europe, Benfica played in the UEFA Champions League group stage before reaching the UEFA Europa League quarter-finals. The season started on 9 August 2023, with a 2–0 win over Porto in the Supertaça match, and concluded on 17 May 2024, with a second-place finish in Primeira Liga.

== Season summary ==
=== Pre-Season ===
Benfica entered the 2023–24 season as the defending league champions, with Roger Schmidt remaining as manager for a second consecutive season. Several changes were made to the squad: goalkeeper Anatoliy Trubin, left-backs Juan Bernat and David Jurásek, midfielder Orkun Kökçü, wingers Gonçalo Guedes and Ángel Di María, and striker Arthur Cabral all joined the club. Departures included Odysseas Vlachodimos, Álex Grimaldo, Mihailo Ristić, Gilberto, Lucas Veríssimo, Cher Ndour, Diego Moreira, Martim Neto (on loan), Andreas Schjelderup, Henrique Araújo (on loan), and Gonçalo Ramos.

Pre-season began on 5 July, with the first friendly taking place on 12 July, a 2–0 win over Southampton. Further victories followed against Basel, Al-Nassr, and Celta de Vigo, before two defeats to Burnley and Feyenoord.

=== August-November ===
The first official match of the season was on 9 August 2023 in the Supertaça Cândido de Oliveira against Porto, which Benfica won 2–0 with goals from Di María and Petar Musa. In the opening league match, Benfica lost 3–2 away to Boavista after Musa was sent off in the 50th minute, when the team was leading 2–1. The team responded with four consecutive league victories before losing 2–0 at home to Red Bull Salzburg in their opening Champions League group-stage match. Benfica then defeated Portimonense 3–1, and on 29 September hosted Porto in the seventh league round, winning 1–0 through a goal from Di María and ending the month one point behind leaders Sporting.

October began with a visit to the San Siro to face Inter Milan, ending in a 1–0 defeat. The team then defeated Estoril in the league and Lusitânia in the third round of the Taça de Portugal, before suffering another Champions League defeat, losing 1–0 at home to Real Sociedad. A home draw with Casa Pia followed, after which Benfica earned two consecutive wins, one in the league and one in the Taça da Liga, before again losing to Real Sociedad. On 12 November, Benfica hosted Sporting. After conceding to a goal from Viktor Gyökeres, the team completed a comeback in stoppage time with goals from João Neves and Casper Tengstedt in the fourth and eighth minutes of injury time, respectively, moving into first place in the league.

=== December-February ===
After the international break, Benfica hosted Inter Milan, taking a 3–0 lead at half-time with a hat-trick from João Mário, but conceded three goals in the second half, drawing 3–3. The draw was followed by two consecutive league stalemates against Moreirense and Farense. On 12 December, already eliminated from the Champions League and fighting for a place in the Europa League, Benfica travelled to Austria to face Red Bull Salzburg, winning 3–1, with the decisive goal scored by Arthur Cabral in stoppage time. Following that victory, Benfica defeated Braga, AVS (in the Taça da Liga) and Famalicão, finishing the year one point behind Sporting.

In January, Benfica won all five of its league matches and defeated Braga 3–2 in the round of 16 of the Taça de Portugal. However, on 24 January, the team was eliminated from the Taça da Liga after losing on penalties to Estoril in the semi-finals. The following month began with victories over Gil Vicente in the league and Vizela in the quarter-finals of the Taça de Portugal, followed by a 2–2 draw away to Vitória de Guimarães. Benfica then eliminated Toulouse from the Europa League, and went on to beat Vizela and Portimonense in the league. The month ended with a 2–1 defeat against Sporting in Alvalade, in the first leg of the Taça de Portugal semi-finals, closing the month Benfica one point behind the league leaders.

=== March-May ===
March began with Benfica visiting the Estádio do Dragão, where they suffered a 5–0 defeat against FC Porto. The team then drew 2–2 at home with Rangers in the first leg of the Europa League round of 16, before securing a 1–0 victory in Scotland to advance to the quarter-finals. In the league, Benfica won all three of its matches before hosting Sporting in the second leg of the Taça de Portugal semi-finals. The match ended in a 2–2 draw, resulting in Benfica’s elimination from the competition. On 6 April, Benfica returned to the Estádio José Alvalade for a decisive league encounter against Sporting, entering the match one point behind their rivals (with one game in hand), but were defeated 2–1, falling seven points adrift in the title race.

After being eliminated in the semi-finals of both domestic cups and facing a significant disadvantage in the league, Benfica hosted Olympique de Marseille in the quarter-finals of the Europa League, winning 2–1 at home. In the second leg, played in Marseille, Benfica lost 1–0, with the tie decided on penalties, where the French side advanced. With five league matches remaining, Benfica recorded three wins, one draw, and one defeat, finishing the season ten points behind champions Sporting.

== Players ==
=== First-team squad ===
Note: Flags indicate national team as defined under FIFA eligibility rules; some limited exceptions apply. Players may hold more than one non-FIFA nationality.

No.	Pos.	Nation	Player
1	GK	UKR	Anatoliy Trubin
3	DF	ESP	Álvaro Carreras (on loan from Man United)
4	DF	POR	António Silva
5	DF	BRA	Morato
6	DF	DEN	Alexander Bah
7	MF	BRA	David Neres
8	MF	NOR	Fredrik Aursnes
9	FW	BRA	Arthur Cabral
10	MF	TUR	Orkun Kökçü
11	FW	ARG	Ángel Di María
14	DF	ESP	Juan Bernat (on loan from PSG)
19	FW	DEN	Casper Tengstedt
20	MF	POR	João Mário (vice-captain)

No.	Pos.	Nation	Player
24	GK	POR	Samuel Soares
25	FW	ARG	Gianluca Prestianni
27	FW	POR	Rafa Silva
30	DF	ARG	Nicolás Otamendi (captain)
32	FW	ARG	Benjamín Rollheiser (on loan from Estudiantes LP)
36	FW	BRA	Marcos Leonardo
44	DF	POR	Tomás Araújo
45	GK	JPN	Leo Kokubo
47	MF	POR	Tiago Gouveia
61	MF	POR	Florentino
75	GK	POR	André Gomes
87	MF	POR	João Neves

== Transfers ==
=== In ===
No.	Pos	Player	Transferred from	Fee	Date	Source
Summer transfers
10	MF	(Turkey) Orkun Kökçü	(Netherlands) Feyenoord	€25,000,000	1 July 2023	
11	FW	(Argentina) Ángel Di María	(Italy) Juventus	Free	5 July 2023	
13	DF	(Czech Republic) David Jurásek	(Czech Republic) Slavia Prague	€14,000,000	10 July 2023	
1	GK	(Ukraine) Anatoliy Trubin	(Ukraine) Shakhtar Donetsk	€10,000,000	10 August 2023	
9	FW	(Brazil) Arthur Cabral	(Italy) Fiorentina	€20,000,000	10 August 2023	
17	FW	(Portugal) Gonçalo Guedes	(England) Wolverhampton Wanderers	Loan	29 August 2023	
14	DF	(Spain) Juan Bernat	(France) Paris Saint-Germain	Loan	1 September 2023	
Winter transfers
36	FW	(Brazil) Marcos Leonardo	(Brazil) Santos	€18,000,000	4 January 2024	
3	DF	(Spain) Álvaro Carreras	(England) Manchester United	Loan	17 January 2024	
32	FW	(Argentina) Benjamín Rollheiser	(Argentina) Estudiantes de La Plata	Loan	20 January 2024	
25	FW	(Argentina) Gianluca Prestianni	(Argentina) Vélez Sarsfield	€9,000,000	31 January 2024	
Disclosed total
€96,800,000

=== Out ===
No.	Pos	Player	Transferred to	Fee	Date	Source
Summer transfers
—	MF	(Germany) Julian Weigl	(Germany) Borussia Mönchengladbach	€7,180,000	1 July 2023	
3	DF	(Spain) Álex Grimaldo	(Germany) Bayer Leverkusen	Free	1 July 2023	
—	DF	(Portugal) Sandro Cruz	(Portugal) Chaves	Free	1 July 2023	
73	MF	(Italy) Cher Ndour	(France) Paris Saint-Germain	Free	1 July 2023	
96	MF	(Portugal) Diego Moreira	(England) Chelsea	Free	1 July 2023	
—	FW	(Switzerland) Haris Seferovic	(United Arab Emirates) Al Wasl	Free	5 July 2023	
2	DF	(Brazil) Gilberto	(Brazil) Bahia	€2,500,000	9 July 2023	
—	FW	(Portugal) Henrique Araújo	(Portugal) Famalicão	Loan	18 July 2023	
4	DF	(Brazil) Lucas Veríssimo	(Brazil) Corinthians	Loan (€1,000,000)	26 July 2023	
49	MF	(Portugal) Martim Neto	(Portugal) Gil Vicente	Loan	1 August 2023	
9	FW	(Portugal) Gonçalo Ramos	(France) Paris Saint-Germain	Loan	7 August 2023	
17	MF	(France) Soualiho Meïté	(Greece) PAOK	Loan	27 August 2023	
18	MF	(Portugal) Paulo Bernardo	(Scotland) Celtic	Loan	1 September 2023	
21	FW	(Norway) Andreas Schjelderup	(Denmark) Nordsjælland	Loan (€2,500,000)	1 September 2023	
23	DF	(Serbia) Mihailo Ristić	(Spain) Celta Vigo	€1,500,000	1 September 2023	
99	GK	(Greece) Odysseas Vlachodimos	(England) Nottingham Forest	€9,000,000	1 September 2023	
Winter transfers
—	FW	(Portugal) Gonçalo Ramos	(France) Paris Saint-Germain	€65,000,000	22 November 2023	
38	DF	(Brazil) João Victor	(Brazil) Vasco da Gama	€6,000,000	31 December 2023	
—	MF	(Brazil) Gabriel Pires	(Brazil) Fluminense	Free	18 January 2024	
22	MF	(Portugal) Chiquinho	(Greece) Olympiacos	€1,000,000	20 January 2024	
13	DF	(Czech Republic) David Jurásek	(Germany) TSG Hoffenheim	Loan	22 January 2024	
—	DF	(Brazil) Lucas Veríssimo	(Qatar) Al-Duhail	€9,000,000	25 January 2024	
33	FW	(Croatia) Petar Musa	(United States) FC Dallas	€10,000,000	1 February 2024	
Disclosed total
€114,680,000

== Pre-season friendlies ==
Win Draw Loss

The pre-season began on 5 July 2023.

12 July 2023 Friendly	Southampton	0–2	Benfica	Burton upon Trent, England
15:00 WEST (UTC+1)		Report	Neres 11'; Ristić 45'	Stadium: St George's Park; Attendance: 0 Referee: Sunny Gill
Note: Televised training match

16 July 2023 Friendly	Basel	1–3	Benfica	Basel, Switzerland
16:00 WEST (UTC+2)	Calafiori (yellow card) 76'; Onyegbule 81'	Report	Di María 24'; Ramos 29'; Jurásek 41'; Schjelderup (yellow card) 76'	Stadium: St. Jakob-Park; Attendance: 22,072; Referee: Mirel Turkes

20 July 2023 Algarve Cup	Al Nassr	1–4 (5–5 p)	Benfica	Faro/Loulé, Portugal
20:30 WEST (UTC+1)	Al-Ghannam 42'; Talisca (yellow card) 55'	Report	Di María 23'; Ramos 31', 39'; Schjelderup 68'	Stadium: Estádio Algarve; Attendance: 17,516; Referee: Flávio Duarte
	Penalties
	Brozović (penalty scored); Ghareeb (penalty scored); Al-Ghannam (penalty scored); Lajami (penalty scored); Talisca (penalty scored)		(penalty scored) João Mário; (penalty scored) Chiquinho; (penalty scored) Aursnes; (penalty scored) Araújo; (penalty scored) Ristić
Note: A penalty shoot-out was held after the match in case the competition needed a tiebreaker.

21 July 2023 Algarve Cup	Benfica	2–0	Celta Vigo	Faro/Loulé, Portugal
20:30 WEST (UTC+1)	Di María 90' (pen.); Musa 90+1'	Report	Núñez (yellow card) 74'; Baeza (yellow card) 80'	Stadium: Estádio Algarve; Attendance: 14,822; Referee: Carlos Teixeira
Note: Benfica won the tournament.

25 July 2023 Friendly	Burnley	2–0	Benfica	Lisbon, Portugal
20:30 WEST (UTC+1)	Cork (yellow card) 30'; Dogson 56'; Ekdal 82'	Report		Stadium: Estádio do Restelo; Attendance: ~12,000; Referee: Pedro Ramalho

30 July 2023 Friendly	Feyenoord	2–1	Benfica	Rotterdam, Netherlands
16:00 CEST (UTC+2)	Paixão 12'; Giménez 34'	Report	Di María (yellow card) 30'; Musa 85'	Stadium: De Kuip; Referee: Dennis Higler

== Competitions ==
=== Overall record ===
Competition	First match	Last match	Starting round	Final position	Record							
Competition	First match	Last match	Starting round	Final position	Pld	W	D	L	GF	GA	GD	Win %
Primeira Liga	14 August 2023	17 May 2024	Matchday 1	2nd	34	25	5	4	77	28	+49	73.53
Taça de Portugal	20 October 2023	2 April 2024	Third round	Semi-finals	6	4	1	1	14	8	+6	66.67
Taça da Liga	31 October 2023	24 January 2024	Group stage	Semi-finals	3	2	1	0	7	2	+5	66.67
Supertaça Cândido de Oliveira	9 August 2023		Final	Winners	1	1	0	0	2	0	+2	100.00
UEFA Champions League	20 September 2023	12 December 2023	Group stage	Group stage	6	1	1	4	7	11	−4	16.67
UEFA Europa League	15 February 2024	18 April 2024	Knockout round play-offs	Quarter-finals	6	3	2	1	7	5	+2	50.00
Total					56	36	10	10	114	54	+60	64.29

Source: Soccerway

=== Primeira Liga ===
==== League table ====
Pos	Team	Pld	W	D	L	GF	GA	GD	Pts	Qualification or relegation
1	Sporting CP (C)	34	29	3	2	96	29	+67	90	Qualification for the Champions League league phase (Note: Since Atalanta, the winners of the 2023–24 UEFA Europa League, qualified for the Champions League via league position, Benfica was promoted from the Champions League third qualifying round to the league phase, as the team with the highest coefficient out of all the teams in Champions League qualifying.)
2	Benfica	34	25	5	4	77	28	+49	80	Qualification for the Champions League league phase
3	Porto	34	22	6	6	63	27	+36	72	Qualification for the Europa League league phase (Note: Porto qualified for the Europa League league phase by winning the 2023–24 Taça de Portugal.)
4	Braga	34	21	5	8	71	50	+21	68	Qualification for the Europa League second qualifying round (Note: Since the 2023–24 Taça de Portugal winners, Porto, finished in top three, the spot given to the third-placed team (Europa League second qualifying round) was passed to the fourth-placed team, and the spot given to the fourth-placed team (Conference League second qualifying round) was passed to the fifth-placed team.)
5	Vitória de Guimarães	34	19	6	9	52	38	+14	63	Qualification for the Conference League second qualifying round

Source: Liga Portugal
Rules for classification: 1) Points; 2) Head-to-head points; 3) Head-to-head goal difference; 4) Head-to-head away goals scored; 5) Goal difference; 6) Matches won; 7) Goals scored; 8) Play-off.
(C) Champions

==== Results summary ====
Overall								Home						Away					
Pld	W	D	L	GF	GA	GD	Pts	W	D	L	GF	GA	GD	W	D	L	GF	GA	GD
34	25	5	4	77	28	+49	80	15	2	0	48	7	+41	10	3	4	29	21	+8

Source: Liga Portugal

==== Results by round ====
Round	1	2	3	4	5	6	7	8	9	10	11	12	13	14	15	16	17	18	19	20	21	22	23	24	25	26	27	28	29	30	31	32	33	34
Ground	A	H	A	H	A	A	H	A	H	A	H	A	H	A	H	A	H	H	A	H	A	H	H	A	H	A	H	A	H	A	H	A	H	A
Result	L	W	W	W	W	W	W	W	D	W	W	D	D	W	W	W	W	W	W	W	D	W	W	L	W	W	W	L	W	W	W	L	W	D
Position	11	11	5	4	4	3	2	2	2	2	1	2	3	2	2	2	2	2	2	1	1	1	1	2	2	2	2	2	2	2	2	2	2	2
Points	0	3	6	9	12	15	18	21	22	25	28	29	30	33	36	39	42	45	48	51	52	55	58	58	61	64	67	67	70	73	76	76	79	80

Source: Liga Portugal
A = Away; H = Home; W = Win; D = Draw; L = Loss

==== Matches ====
14 August 2023 1	Boavista	3–2	Benfica	Porto
20:45 WEST (UTC+1)	Reisinho (yellow card) 1'; Makouta (yellow card) 11'; Pérez (yellow card) 14'; Boženík 55', 90+13' (yellow card) 90+15'; Onyemaechi (yellow card) 67'; Lourenço 90' (pen.) (red card) 90+9'; Berna (yellow card) 90+8'	Report	Di María 22' (yellow card) 54'; Musa (red card) 50'; R. Silva (yellow card) 65' (goal) 75'; Bah (yellow card) 82'; A. Silva (yellow card) 88'	Stadium: Estádio do Bessa; Attendance: 21,320; Referee: António Nobre (Leiria)

19 August 2023 2	Benfica	2–0	Estrela da Amadora	Lisbon
20:30 WEST (UTC+1)	Neves (yellow card) 37'; João Mário (yellow card) 44'; Cabral (yellow card) 50'; Tengstedt 79'; R. Silva 90+3'	Report	Omurwa (yellow card) 11'; Mansur (yellow card) 55'; Hevertton (yellow card) 90+6'	Stadium: Estádio da Luz; Attendance: 58,479; Referee: Gustavo Correia (Porto)

26 August 2023 3	Gil Vicente	2–3	Benfica	Barcelos
20:30 WEST (UTC+1)	Dominguez (yellow card) 17' (goal) 90+8'; Tiba (yellow card) 29'; Touré 74'; Zé Carlos (yellow card) 78'	Report	Di María 19'; Kökçü (yellow card) 45+4'; R. Silva 53' (yellow card) 67'; Florentino (yellow card) 67'; Musa 90+4'	Stadium: Estádio Cidade de Barcelos; Attendance: 11,792; Referee: João Pinheiro (Braga)

2 September 2023 4	Benfica	4–0	Vitória de Guimarães	Lisbon
20:30 WEST (UTC+1)	Fernandes 11' (o.g.); Bah (yellow card) 30'; Di María 31'; Kökçü 45+4'; Aursnes 46'; Otamendi (yellow card) 60'	Report	T. Silva (yellow card) 17'; Mendes (red card) 18'; J. Silva (yellow card) 40'; Händel (yellow card) 79'; Freitas (yellow card) 90+5'	Stadium: Estádio da Luz; Attendance: 60,410; Referee: Nuno Almeida (Algarve)

16 September 2023 5	Vizela	1–2	Benfica	Vizela
20:30 WEST (UTC+1)	Samu 70' (pen.); Pereira (yellow card) 90+5'; Wilson (yellow card) 90+12'	Report	Musa 9'; Di María 39'; Aursnes (yellow card) 67'	Stadium: Estádio do FC Vizela; Attendance: 5,584; Referee: Luís Godinho (Évora)

24 September 2023 6	Portimonense	1–3	Benfica	Portimão
18:00 WEST (UTC+1)	Varela (yellow card) 35' (goal) 56'	Report	Bah 5'; Musa 17'; Neres 66'	Stadium: Estádio Municipal de Portimão; Attendance: 4,354; Referee: Hélder Malheiro (Lisbon)

29 September 2023 7	Benfica	1–0	Porto	Lisbon
20:15 WEST (UTC+1)	Neves (yellow card) 59'; Di María 68' (yellow card) 69'; Otamendi (yellow card) 90+5'; Jurásek (yellow card) 90+5'	Report	Cardoso (red card) 19'; Carmo (yellow card) 34'; Taremi (yellow card) 35'; Wendell (yellow card) 77'; Conceição (yellow card) 90+5'	Stadium: Estádio da Luz; Attendance: 62,247; Referee: João Pinheiro (Braga)

7 October 2023 8	Estoril	0–1	Benfica	Estoril
20:30 WEST (UTC+1)	Cassiano (yellow card) 41'; Tavares (yellow card) 62'; Fernandes (yellow card) 70'	Report	Chiquinho (yellow card) 49'; A. Silva (yellow card) 61' (goal) 90+3'	Stadium: Estádio António Coimbra da Mota; Attendance: 4,966; Referee: André Narciso (Setúbal)

28 October 2023 9	Benfica	1–1	Casa Pia	Lisbon
18:00 WET (UTC+0)	João Mário 44'; Florentino (yellow card) 74'	Report	Larrazabal (yellow card) 41' (goal) 81'; Roberto (yellow card) 73'	Stadium: Estádio da Luz; Attendance: 57,240; Referee: Claúdio Pereira (Aveiro)

4 November 2023 10	Chaves	0–2	Benfica	Chaves
15:30 WET (UTC+0)	Ribeiro (yellow card) 25'; Lameiras (yellow card) 41'; Victor (yellow card) 75'; Langa (yellow card) 77'; Abass (yellow card) 89'	Report	Otamendi (yellow card) 44'; Aursnes 59'; João Mário 80' (pen.); A. Silva (yellow card) 87'	Stadium: Estádio Municipal Eng. Manuel Branco Teixeira; Attendance: 8,271; Referee: Hélder Malheiro (Lisbon)

12 November 2023 11	Benfica	2–1	Sporting CP	Lisbon
20:30 WET (UTC+0)	João Mário (yellow card) 66'; Neves (yellow card) 75' (goal) 90+4'; Tengstedt 90+7'	Report	Coates (yellow card) 15'; Inácio (yellow card) 22' (yellow-red card) 51'; Gyökeres 45'; Edwards (yellow card) 57'; Hjulmand (yellow card) 69'; Neto	Stadium: Estádio da Luz; Attendance: 62,166; Referee: Artur Soares Dias (Porto)

3 December 2023 12	Moreirense	0–0	Benfica	Moreira de Cónegos
18:00 WET (UTC+0)	Ismael (yellow card) 23'; Maracás (yellow card) 45+3'; Franco (yellow card) 46'; Marcelo (yellow card) 50'	Report	Kökçü (yellow card) 79'	Stadium: Parque de Jogos Comendador Joaquim de Almeida Freitas; Attendance: 5,664; Referee: Fábio Veríssimo (Leiria)

8 December 2023 13	Benfica	1–1	Farense	Lisbon
18:00 WET (UTC+0)	R. Silva 71'; Otamendi (yellow card) 78'; João Mário (yellow card) 82'	Report	Muscat (yellow card) 36'; Falcão 51'; Pastor (yellow card) 90'; Cáseres (yellow card) 90+1'	Stadium: Estádio da Luz; Attendance: 56,766; Referee: Miguel Nogueira (Lisbon)

17 December 2023 14	Braga	0–1	Benfica	Braga
20:30 WET (UTC+0)	Saatçı (yellow card) 26'; Fonte (yellow card) 75'; Carvalho (yellow card) 90+3'	Report	Morato (yellow card) 2'; Tengstedt 3'; Trubin (yellow card) 88'; Otamendi (yellow card) 90+4'	Stadium: Estádio Municipal de Braga; Attendance: 25,532; Referee: Luís Godinho (Évora)

29 December 2023 15	Benfica	3–0	Famalicão	Lisbon
18:45 WET (UTC+0)	Cabral 31'; Kökçü (yellow card) 62'; Musa (yellow card) 80' (goal) 88'; R. Silva 85'	Report	Chiquinho (yellow card) 37'; Otávio (yellow card) 61'; Assunção (yellow card) 90+2'	Stadium: Estádio da Luz; Attendance: 58,725; Referee: André Narciso (Setúbal)

6 January 2024 16	Arouca	0–3	Benfica	Arouca
18:00 WET (UTC+0)	Montero (yellow card) 13'; Kouassi (yellow card) 76'	Report	R. Silva 39'; Kökçü 48'; Cabral (yellow card) 71'; Florentino (yellow card) 79'; Musa 85'	Stadium: Estádio Municipal de Arouca; Attendance: 4,437; Referee: Fábio Veríssimo (Leiria)

14 January 2024 17	Benfica	4–1	Rio Ave	Lisbon
18:00 WET (UTC+0)	Di María 28'; Kökçü (yellow card) 57'; A. Silva 61'; Marcos Leonardo 80'; João Mário 90+1'	Report	Guga 9'; Santos (yellow card) 48' (yellow-red card) 58'; Patrick William (yellow card) 90+3'	Stadium: Estádio da Luz; Attendance: 55,238; Referee: Iancu Vasilica (Vila Real)

19 January 2024 18	Benfica	2–0	Boavista	Lisbon
20:15 WET (UTC+0)	Otamendi (yellow card) 48'; R. Silva (yellow card) 55'; Florentino (yellow card) 55'; Di María 61'; Marcos Leonardo 90+4'	Report	Abascal (yellow card) 57'; Pérez (yellow card) 79'; Vukotić (yellow card) 86'	Stadium: Estádio da Luz; Attendance: 54,345; Referee: Gustavo Correia (Porto)

29 January 2024 19	Estrela da Amadora	1–4	Benfica	Amadora
18:45 WET (UTC+0)	Léo Jabá 28'; N'do (yellow card) 45+2' (yellow-red card) 72'	Report	Di María (yellow card) 41'; Cabral 44'; R. Silva 45+1'; Otamendi 52'; Marcos Leonardo 90+3'	Stadium: Estádio José Gomes; Attendance: 6,398; Referee: Hélder Malheiro (Lisbon)

4 February 2024 20	Benfica	3–0	Gil Vicente	Lisbon
18:00 WET (UTC+0)	Cabral 15'; Neves 34'; R. Silva 49'	Report	Castillo (yellow card) 74'	Stadium: Estádio da Luz; Attendance: 58,722; Referee: Tiago Martins (Lisbon)

11 February 2024 21	Vitória de Guimarães	2–2	Benfica	Guimarães
20:30 WET (UTC+0)	Jota Silva (yellow card) 8'; Tiago Silva 35' (pen.); Gaspar (yellow card) 38'; André Silva 60'; Borevković (red card) 64'; Santos (yellow card) 73'; Oliveira (yellow card) 90+5'	Report	Kökçü (yellow card) 33'; R. Silva 40'; A. Silva (yellow card) 44'; Florentino (yellow card) 77'; Cabral 90'; Otamendi (yellow card)	Stadium: Estádio D. Afonso Henriques; Attendance: 25,015; Referee: Luís Godinho (Évora)

18 February 2024 22	Benfica	6–1	Vizela	Lisbon
18:00 WET (UTC+0)	Neres 16', 45'; Otamendi 25'; Gouveia 30'; R. Silva 45+3'; Marcos Leonardo 88'	Report	Costa (yellow card) 40'; Essende 48' (yellow card) 58'; Anderson (yellow card) 52'; Bursać (yellow card) 73'	Stadium: Estádio da Luz; Attendance: 56,191; Referee: João Gonçalves (Porto)

25 February 2024 23	Benfica	4–0	Portimonense	Lisbon
18:00 WET (UTC+0)	R. Silva 55', 72'; Neres 57'; Di María 58'	Report	Varela (yellow card) 69'	Stadium: Estádio da Luz; Attendance: 57,201; Referee: Miguel Nogueira (Lisbon)

3 March 2024 24	Porto	5–0	Benfica	Porto
20:30 WET (UTC+0)	Conceição (yellow card) 12'; Galeno 20', 44'; Wendell 55'; Pepê 75'; González (yellow card) 79'; Namaso 90'	Report	Morato (yellow card) 31'; Otamendi (yellow card) 52' (yellow-red card) 61'	Stadium: Estádio do Dragão; Attendance: 49,013; Referee: João Pinheiro (Braga)

10 March 2024 25	Benfica	3–1	Estoril	Lisbon
20:30 WET (UTC+0)	Kökçü 15'; Marcos Leonardo 45+2'; Gouveia 49'	Report	Gomes 22'	Stadium: Estádio da Luz; Attendance: 48,964; Referee: Manuel Oliveira (Porto)

17 March 2024 26	Casa Pia	0–1	Benfica	Rio Maior
18:00 WET (UTC+0)		Report	Florentino (yellow card) 45'; Cabral 74'; A. Silva (yellow card) 77'	Stadium: Estádio Municipal de Rio Maior; Attendance: 6,925; Referee: Claúdio Pereira (Aveiro)

29 March 2024 27	Benfica	1–0	Chaves	Lisbon
18:00 WET (UTC+0)	Otamendi (yellow card) 45+3'; Neves 66'	Report	Pius (yellow card) 25'; H. Souza (yellow card) 31'; Hernández (yellow card) 45'; Rúben (yellow card) 56'; Guima (yellow card) 63'; Benny (yellow card) 65'; Guzzo (yellow card) 65'; V. Fernandes (yellow card) 90+2'	Stadium: Estádio da Luz; Attendance: 55,351; Referee: Hélder Malheiro (Lisbon)

6 April 2024 28	Sporting CP	2–1	Benfica	Lisbon
20:30 WEST (UTC+1)	Catamo 1', 90+1' (yellow card) 4'; Hjulmand (yellow card) 27'; Nuno Santos (yellow card) 90+1'; Paulinho (yellow card) 90+6'	Report	Otamendi (yellow card) 27'; Neres (yellow card) 39'; Bah (yellow card) 45+1' (goal) 45+3'; Tengstedt (yellow card) 74'; Aursnes (yellow card) 85' (yellow-red card) 90+8'; A. Silva (yellow card) 90+9'	Stadium: Estádio José Alvalade; Attendance: 48,113; Referee: Artur Soares Dias (Porto)

14 April 2024 29	Benfica	3–0	Moreirense	Lisbon
20:30 WEST (UTC+1)	Kökçü 18'; Araújo 45+1'; Carreras (yellow card) 61'; Rollheiser 78' (yellow card) 87'	Report	Ismael (yellow card) 90+4'	Stadium: Estádio da Luz; Attendance: 49,083; Referee: Hélder Carvalho (Santarém)

22 April 2024 30	Farense	1–3	Benfica	Faro
20:15 WEST (UTC+1)	Belloumi 23'; Falcão (yellow card) 53'	Report	Kökçü 16'; Florentino (yellow card) 25'; Cabral 33'; João Mário (yellow card) 44'; Carreras 68'	Stadium: Estádio de São Luís; Attendance: 6,309; Referee: Gustavo Correia (Porto)

27 April 2024 31	Benfica	3–1	Braga	Lisbon
18:00 WEST (UTC+1)	Marcos Leonardo 71', 90+5' (yellow card) 90+5'; Neres 85'; Kökçü (yellow card) 90+5'	Report	Horta 28'; Moutinho (yellow card) 77'; Ndour (yellow card) 82'; Gómez (red card) 89'; Carvalho (yellow card) 90+7'	Stadium: Estádio da Luz; Attendance: 55,727; Referee: João Pinheiro (Braga)

5 May 2024 32	Famalicão	2–0	Benfica	Vila Nova de Famalicão
20:30 WEST (UTC+1)	Cádiz (yellow card) 63'; Rodríguez 71' (yellow card) 87'; Youssouf 85'	Report	Gouveia (yellow card) 87'	Stadium: Estádio Municipal 22 de Junho; Attendance: 4,827; Referee: João Gonçalves (Porto)

12 May 2024 33	Benfica	5–0	Arouca	Lisbon
18:00 WEST (UTC+1)	Di María 25' (pen.) (yellow card) 59'; Kökçü 32' (pen.); Florentino (yellow card) 36'; R. Silva 42', 46'; Tengstedt 77'	Report	Montero (yellow card) 28'; Simão (yellow card) 59'	Stadium: Estádio da Luz; Attendance: 49,364; Referee: Fábio Melo (Porto)

17 May 2024 34	Rio Ave	1–1	Benfica	Vila do Conde
20:45 WEST (UTC+1)	Graça (yellow card) 23'; Patrick (yellow card) 45+2'; Oudrhiri (yellow card) 57'; Adrien Silva (yellow card) 86'; Costinha 90+3' (pen.)	Report	Kökçü 32' (yellow card) 86'; Tengstedt (yellow card) 39'	Stadium: Estádio dos Arcos; Attendance: 4,809; Referee: David Rafael Silva (Porto)

=== Taça de Portugal ===
20 October 2023 Third round	Lusitânia	1–4	Benfica	São Bento
15:30 WEST (UTC+0)	Ferrara 45' (pen.); Bessa (yellow card) 83'	Report	João Mário 9'; R. Silva 36'; Aursnes (yellow card) 44'; Cabral 68'; Gouveia 87'	Stadium: Estádio João Paulo II; Referee: Ricardo Baixinho (Lisbon)

25 November 2023 Fourth round	Benfica	2–0	Famalicão	Lisbon
20:45 WET (UTC±0)	Riccieli 72' (o.g.); Di María (yellow card) 76'; R. Silva 77'	Report	Youssouf (yellow card) 42'; Otávio (red card) 74'; Júnior (yellow card) 78'	Stadium: Estádio da Luz; Attendance: 52,609; Referee: Manuel Oliveira (Porto)

10 January 2024 Fifth round	Benfica	3–2	Braga	Lisbon
20:45 WET (UTC±0)	Morato (yellow card) 41'; R. Silva 42'; Cabral 44'; Di María (yellow card) 59'; Aursnes 70'	Report	João Mário 7' (o.g.); Zalazar 48'; Vitor Carvalho (yellow card) 58'; Oliveira (yellow card) 72'	Stadium: Estádio da Luz; Attendance: 56,018; Referee: Nuno Almeida (Algarve)

8 February 2024 Quarter-finals	Vizela	1–2	Benfica	Vizela
20:45 WET (UTC±0)	Samu (yellow card) 36'; Costa (yellow card) 57'; Pereira (yellow card) 61'; Petrov 68'; Jardel (yellow card) 90+2'	Report	Cabral 34'; Di María (yellow card) 45'; Carreras (yellow card) 56'; João Mário 65'; Otamendi (yellow card) 90+3'	Stadium: Estádio do FC Vizela; Attendance: 3,798; Referee: Hélder Carvalho (Santarém)

==== Semi-finals ====
29 February 2024 First leg	Sporting CP	2–1	Benfica	Lisbon
20:45 WET (UTC±00:00)	Gonçalves 9'; Hjulmand (yellow card) 33'; Paulinho (yellow card) 41'; Gyökeres 54'	Report	Otamendi (yellow card) 31'; Aursnes 68'; Di María (yellow card) 75'; Kökçü (yellow card) 75'; R. Silva (yellow card) 79'	Stadium: Estádio José Alvalade; Attendance: 45,393; Referee: Fábio Veríssimo (Leiria)

2 April 2024 Second leg	Benfica	2–2 (3–4 agg.)	Sporting CP	Lisbon
20:45 WEST (UTC+01:00)	Di María (yellow card) 45+3'; Otamendi 52'; R. Silva 64'	Report	Hjulmand 47'; Inácio (yellow card) 49'; Paulinho 55'; Morita (yellow card) 72'; Israel (yellow card) 77'; Edwards (yellow card) 90+2'	Stadium: Estádio da Luz; Attendance: 59,113; Referee: João Pinheiro (Braga)

=== Taça da Liga ===
==== Third round ====
Pos	Team	Pld	W	D	L	GF	GA	GD	Pts	Qualification	BEN	ARO	AVS
1	Benfica	2	2	0	0	6	1	+5	6	Advance to knockout phase	—	—	4–1
2	Arouca	2	1	0	1	2	3	−1	3		0–2	—	—
3	AVS	2	0	0	2	2	6	−4	0		—	1–2	—

Source: Liga Portugal
Rules for classification: Tiebreakers

31 October 2023	Arouca	0–2	Benfica	Arouca
20:15 WET (UTC±00:00)	Montero (yellow card) 25'; Fernandes (yellow card) 40'; Kouassi (yellow card) 57'	Report	Di María 26'; A. Silva (yellow card) 35'; Guedes (yellow card) 44'; Cabral 73'	Stadium: Estádio Municipal de Arouca; Attendance: 3,405; Referee: Hélder Carvalho (Santarém)

21 December 2023	Benfica	4–1	AVS	Lisbon
20:15 WET (UTC±00:00)	Di María 31'; João Mário 44'; A. Silva (yellow card) 53'; Gouveia 65'; Anthony 68' (o.g.)	Report	Mercado 21'; Anthony (yellow card) 55'; Zé Ricardo (yellow card) 62'; Alaba (yellow card) 87'; Clayton (yellow card) 90'	Stadium: Estádio da Luz; Attendance: 48,959; Referee: Carlos Macedo (Braga)

==== Semi-finals ====
24 January 2024	Benfica	1–1 (4–5 p)	Estoril	Leiria
19:45 WET (UTC±00:00)	Kökçü (yellow card) 45+1'; Otamendi 58'; João Mário (yellow card) 60'; Morato (yellow card) 77'; Gouveia (yellow card) 89'	Report	Guitane 16'; Pina (yellow card) 45+1'; Mangala (yellow card) 67'; Fernandes (yellow card) 90+1'	Stadium: Estádio Municipal de Leiria; Attendance: 20,155; Referee: Claúdio Pereira (Aveiro)
	Penalties
	João Mário (penalty scored); Marcos Leonardo (penalty missed); Otamendi (penalty scored); Cabral (penalty scored); Di María (penalty scored); Araújo (penalty missed)		(penalty scored) Guitane; (penalty scored) Marqués; (penalty scored) Ndiaye; (penalty missed) Marques; (penalty scored) Araújo; (penalty scored) Vital

=== Supertaça Cândido de Oliveira ===
9 August 2023 Final	Benfica	2–0	Porto	Aveiro
20:45 WEST (UTC+1)	Ristić (yellow card) 15'; João Mário (yellow card) 16'; Kökçü (yellow card) 28'; Bah (yellow card) 43'; Neves (yellow card) 49'; Di María 61'; Musa 68'; Chiquinho (yellow card) 84'; Vlachodimos (yellow card) 87'	Report	Loader (yellow card) 29'; Pepe (yellow card) 33' (red card) 90'; Pepê (yellow card) 45+2'; Eustáquio (yellow card) 51'; Sanusi (yellow card) 55'	Stadium: Estádio Municipal de Aveiro; Attendance: 30,300; Referee: Luís Godinho (Évora)

=== UEFA Champions League ===
==== Group stage ====
The draw for the group stage was held on 31 August 2023.

Pos	Team	Pld	W	D	L	GF	GA	GD	Pts	Qualification	RSO	INT	BEN	SAL
1	(Spain) Real Sociedad	6	3	3	0	7	2	+5	12 (Note: Tied on head-to-head points, goal difference, and goals scored. Goal difference in all matches: Real Sociedad +5, Inter Milan +3.)	Advance to knockout phase	—	1–1	3–1	0–0
2	(Italy) Inter Milan	6	3	3	0	8	5	+3	12	Advance to knockout phase	0–0	—	1–0	2–1
3	(Portugal) Benfica	6	1	1	4	7	11	−4	4 (Note: Tied on head-to-head points, goal difference, goals scored, and goal difference in all matches. Goals scored in all matches: Benfica 7, Red Bull Salzburg 4.)	Transfer to Europa League	0–1	3–3	—	0–2
4	(Austria) Red Bull Salzburg	6	1	1	4	4	8	−4	4		0–2	0–1	1–3	—

Source: UEFA
Rules for classification: Group stage tiebreakers
Notes:

20 September 2023 1	Benfica (Portugal)	0–2	(Austria) Red Bull Salzburg	Lisbon, Portugal
20:00 WEST (UTC+01:00)	Trubin (yellow card) 2'; A. Silva (red card) 13'; R. Silva (yellow card) 54'; Otamendi (yellow card) 69'	Report	Šimić 15' (pen.) (yellow card) 67'; Gourna-Douath (yellow card) 21'; Gloukh 51'; Baidoo (yellow card) 58'; Koïta (yellow card) 90+1'	Stadium: Estádio da Luz; Attendance: 60,917; Referee: Halil Umut Meler (Turkey)

3 October 2023 2	Inter Milan (Italy)	1–0	(Portugal) Benfica	Milan, Italy
21:00 CEST (UTC+02:00)	Thuram 62'; Martínez (yellow card) 67'; Barella (yellow card) 68'; Dumfries (yellow card) 70'; Asllani (yellow card) 90+5'	Report		Stadium: San Siro; Attendance: 66,573; Referee: Danny Makkelie (Netherlands)

24 October 2023 3	Benfica (Portugal)	0–1	(Spain) Real Sociedad	Lisbon, Portugal
20:00 WEST (UTC+01:00)	Bernat (yellow card) 77'	Report	Méndez 63'; Elustondo (yellow card) 71'; Merino (yellow card) 75'	Stadium: Estádio da Luz; Attendance: 56,002; Referee: Clément Turpin (France)

8 November 2023 4	Real Sociedad (Spain)	3–1	(Portugal) Benfica	San Sebastián, Spain
18:45 CET (UTC+01:00)	Merino 6'; Oyarzabal 11'; Barrenetxea 21' (yellow card) 63'; Fernández (yellow card) 86'	Report	Florentino (yellow card) 20'; R. Silva 49'	Stadium: Reale Arena; Attendance: 36,815; Referee: Anthony Taylor (England)

29 November 2023 5	Benfica (Portugal)	3–3	(Italy) Inter Milan	Lisbon, Portugal
20:00 WET (UTC±00:00)	João Mário 5', 13', 34' (yellow card) 72'; Morato (yellow card) 78'; A. Silva (red card) 84'	Report	Arnautović 51'; Frattesi 58'; Sánchez 72' (pen.); Cuadrado (yellow card) 76'	Stadium: Estádio da Luz; Attendance: 52,944; Referee: Andris Treimanis (Latvia)

12 December 2023 6	Red Bull Salzburg (Austria)	1–3	(Portugal) Benfica	Salzburg, Austria
21:00 CET (UTC+01:00)	Gourna-Douath (yellow card) 10'; Ratkov (yellow card) 51'; Sučić 57'; Kameri (yellow card) 82'; Schlager (yellow card) 90'	Report	Di María 32'; R. Silva 45+1'; Morato (yellow card) 45+4'; Musa (yellow card) 72'; Cabral 90+2'	Stadium: Red Bull Arena; Attendance: 27,134; Referee: Daniel Siebert (Germany)

=== UEFA Europa League ===
==== Knockout phase ====
===== Knockout round play-offs =====
The draw for the knockout round play-offs was held on 18 December 2023.

15 February 2024 First leg	Benfica (Portugal)	2–1	(France) Toulouse	Lisbon, Portugal
20:00 WET (UTC±0)	Di María 68' (pen.), 90+8' (pen.); Kökçü (yellow card) 90+2'	Report	Spierings (yellow card) 37'; Desler (yellow card) 43' (goal) 75'; Restes (yellow card) 58'; Skyttä (yellow card) 90+1'; Mawissa (yellow card) 90+2' (yellow-red card) 90+6'; Magri (yellow card) 90+6'	Stadium: Estádio da Luz; Attendance: 56,553; Referee: Donatas Rumšas (Lithuania)

22 February 2024 Second leg	Toulouse (France)	0–0 (1–2 agg.)	(Portugal) Benfica	Toulouse, France
18:45 CET (UTC+1)	Dønnum (yellow card) 15'; Suazo (yellow card) 74'; Kamanzi (yellow card) 83'	Report	Bah (yellow card) 84'	Stadium: Stadium de Toulouse; Attendance: 31,810; Referee: Maurizio Mariani (Italy)

===== Round of 16 =====
The draw for the round of 16 was held on 23 February 2024.

7 March 2024 First leg	Benfica (Portugal)	2–2	(Scotland) Rangers	Lisbon, Portugal
20:00 WET (UTC±0)	Di Maria (yellow card) 34' (goal) 45+2' (pen.); Goldson 67' (o.g.); Bah (yellow card) 72'	Report	Lawrence 7'; Sterling (yellow card) 27' (goal) 45+5'; Butland (yellow card) 45+1'; Yılmaz (yellow card) 67'	Stadium: Estádio da Luz; Attendance: 48,579; Referee: Tobias Stieler (Germany)

14 March 2024 Second leg	Rangers (Scotland)	0–1 (2–3 agg.)	(Portugal) Benfica	Glasgow, Scotland
17:45 GMT (UTC±0)	Goldson (yellow card) 55'	Report	R. Silva 66'; Tengstedt (yellow card) 90+5'	Stadium: Ibrox Stadium; Attendance: 49,943; Referee: Ivan Kružliak (Slovakia)

===== Quarter-finals =====
The draw for the quarter-finals was held on 15 March 2024.

11 April 2024 First leg	Benfica (Portugal)	2–1	(France) Marseille	Lisbon, Portugal
20:00 WEST (UTC+1)	R. Silva 16'; Neres (yellow card) 18'; Di María 52'	Report	Aubameyang 67'	Stadium: Estádio da Luz; Attendance: 53,845; Referee: Michael Oliver (England)

18 April 2024 Second leg	Marseille (France)	1–0 (a.e.t.) (2–2 agg.) (4–2 p)	(Portugal) Benfica	Marseille, France
21:00 CEST (UTC+2)	Mbemba (yellow card) 45+2'; Moumbagna 79'; Harit (yellow card) 89'; Gigot (yellow card) 89'	Report	A. Silva (yellow card) 38'; Tengstedt (yellow card) 60'; Kökçü (yellow card) 109'; Florentino (yellow card) 113'	Stadium: Stade Vélodrome; Attendance: 59,645; Referee: Felix Zwayer (Germany)
	Penalties
	Correa (penalty scored); Kondogbia (penalty scored); Balerdi (penalty scored); Henrique (penalty scored)		(penalty missed) Di María; (penalty scored) Kökçü; (penalty scored) Otamendi; (penalty missed) A. Silva

== Statistics ==
=== Appearances and goals ===
No.	Pos	Nat	Player	Total		Primeira Liga		Taça de Portugal		Taça da Liga		Supertaça		Champions League		Europa League	
No.	Pos	Nat	Player	Apps	Goals	Apps	Goals	Apps	Goals	Apps	Goals	Apps	Goals	Apps	Goals	Apps	Goals
Goalkeepers
1	GK	(Ukraine) UKR	Anatoliy Trubin	49	0	29	0	5	0	3	0	0	0	6	0	6	0
24	GK	(Portugal) POR	Samuel Soares	6	0	5	0	1	0	0	0	0	0	0	0	0	0
45	GK	(Japan) JPN	Leo Kokubo	0	0	0	0	0	0	0	0	0	0	0	0	0	0
75	GK	(Portugal) POR	André Gomes	0	0	0	0	0	0	0	0	0	0	0	0	0	0
Defenders
3	DF	(Spain) ESP	Álvaro Carreras	16	1	5+6	1	1	0	0+1	0	0	0	0	0	1+2	0
4	DF	(Portugal) POR	António Silva	51	2	30+1	2	6	0	3	0	1	0	4	0	6	0
5	DF	(Brazil) BRA	Morato	35	0	17+4	0	3+2	0	3	0	0	0	4+1	0	1	0
6	DF	(Denmark) DEN	Alexander Bah	32	2	18+1	2	2+1	0	0	0	1	0	3	0	5+1	0
14	DF	(Spain) ESP	Juan Bernat	7	0	1+2	0	1	0	0+1	0	0	0	1+1	0	0	0
30	DF	(Argentina) ARG	Nicolás Otamendi	51	4	31	2	5	1	2	1	1	0	6	0	6	0
44	DF	(Portugal) POR	Tomás Araújo	20	1	5+8	1	0+1	0	1+2	0	0	0	1+2	0	0	0
76	DF	(Brazil) BRA	Gustavo Marques	1	0	0+1	0	0	0	0	0	0	0	0	0	0	0
82	DF	(Portugal) POR	Diogo Spencer	1	0	0+1	0	0	0	0	0	0	0	0	0	0	0
Midfielders
7	MF	(Brazil) BRA	David Neres	35	5	12+12	5	2	0	0	0	0	0	2+1	0	5+1	0
8	MF	(Norway) NOR	Fredrik Aursnes	55	4	31+2	2	6	2	3	0	1	0	6	0	5+1	0
10	MF	(Turkey) TUR	Orkun Kökçü	43	7	23+4	7	3+1	0	2	0	1	0	3+2	0	1+3	0
20	MF	(Portugal) POR	João Mário	51	9	29+2	3	5+1	2	3	1	1	0	5	3	2+3	0
47	MF	(Portugal) POR	Tiago Gouveia	26	4	5+8	2	0+5	1	0+3	1	0	0	0+3	0	0+2	0
61	MF	(Portugal) POR	Florentino	44	0	17+13	0	2+2	0	1+1	0	0+1	0	2+1	0	4	0
84	MF	(Portugal) POR	João Rego	1	0	0+1	0	0	0	0	0	0	0	0	0	0	0
87	MF	(Portugal) POR	João Neves	55	3	27+6	3	6	0	3	0	1	0	6	0	6	0
Forwards
9	FW	(Brazil) BRA	Arthur Cabral	43	11	13+15	6	3+1	3	0+3	1	0	0	1+3	1	2+2	0
11	FW	(Argentina) ARG	Ángel Di María	47	17	25+2	9	5	0	3	2	1	1	5	1	6	4
19	FW	(Denmark) DEN	Casper Tengstedt	31	4	8+9	4	3+1	0	1+1	0	0	0	2+2	0	3+1	0
27	FW	(Portugal) POR	Rafa Silva	51	22	28+1	14	6	4	3	0	1	0	6	2	6	2
32	FW	(Argentina) ARG	Benjamín Rollheiser	9	1	1+8	1	0	0	0	0	0	0	0	0	0	0
25	FW	(Argentina) ARG	Gianluca Prestianni	1	0	0+1	0	0	0	0	0	0	0	0	0	0	0
36	FW	(Brazil) BRA	Marcos Leonardo	21	7	3+11	7	0+2	0	0+1	0	0	0	0	0	1+3	0
89	FW	(Portugal) POR	Gustavo Varela	1	0	0+1	0	0	0	0	0	0	0	0	0	0	0
Players who made an appearance and/or had a squad number but left the team.
4	DF	(Brazil) BRA	Lucas Veríssimo	0	0	0	0	0	0	0	0	0	0	0	0	0	0
9	FW	(Portugal) POR	Gonçalo Ramos	0	0	0	0	0	0	0	0	0	0	0	0	0	0
13	DF	(Czech Republic) CZE	David Jurásek	12	0	2+4	0	0+1	0	0+1	0	0+1	0	1+2	0	0	0
~~17~~	MF	(France) FRA	Soualiho Meïté	0	0	0	0	0	0	0	0	0	0	0	0	0	0
17	FW	(Portugal) POR	Gonçalo Guedes	12	0	0+8	0	0+1	0	0+1	0	0	0	0+2	0	0	0
18	MF	(Portugal) POR	Paulo Bernardo	0	0	0	0	0	0	0	0	0	0	0	0	0	0
21	FW	(Norway) NOR	Andreas Schjelderup	1	0	0	0	0	0	0	0	0+1	0	0	0	0	0
22	MF	(Portugal) POR	Chiquinho	17	0	1+8	0	1+1	0	0	0	0+1	0	0+5	0	0	0
23	DF	(Serbia) SRB	Mihailo Ristić	2	0	0+1	0	0	0	0	0	1	0	0	0	0	0
33	FW	(Croatia) CRO	Petar Musa	25	5	6+8	4	0+3	0	1	0	0+1	1	2+4	0	0	0
38	DF	(Brazil) BRA	João Victor	2	0	0+2	0	0	0	0	0	0	0	0	0	0	0
49	MF	(Portugal) POR	Martim Neto	0	0	0	0	0	0	0	0	0	0	0	0	0	0
65	DF	(Portugal) POR	Rafael Rodrigues	0	0	0	0	0	0	0	0	0	0	0	0	0	0
99	GK	(Greece) GRE	Odysseas Vlachodimos	2	0	1	0	0	0	0	0	1	0	0	0	0	0
