= António Silva (footballer) =

Portuguese footballer (born 2003)

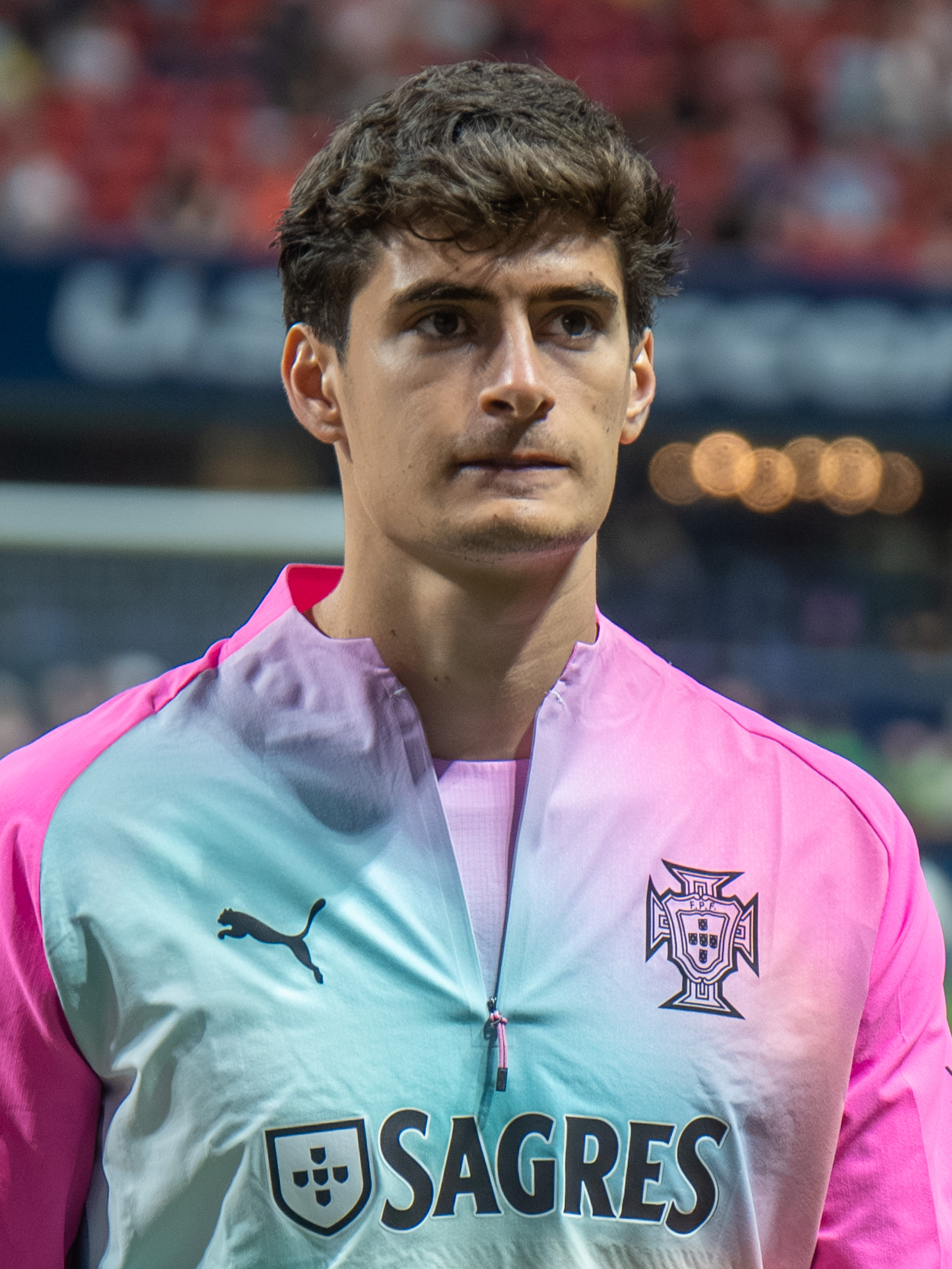
- Silva with Portugal in 2026

Personal information
- Full name: António João Pereira de Albuquerque Tavares da Silva
- Date of birth: 30 October 2003 (age 23)
- Place of birth: Viseu, Portugal
- Height: 1.87 m (6 ft 2 in)
- Position: Centre-back

Team information
- Current team: Bournemouth
- Number: 14

Youth career
- 2010–2012: Penalva do Castelo
- 2012–2015: Repesenses
- 2015–2016: Viseu United
- 2016–2022: Benfica

Senior career*
Years	Team	Apps	(Gls)
2022	Benfica B	4	(0)
2022–2026	Benfica	108	(7)
2026–	Bournemouth	11	(0)

International career^{‡}
2019	Portugal U16	8	(0)
2019–2020	Portugal U17	8	(1)
2021	Portugal U18	2	(0)
2021–2022	Portugal U19	9	(1)
2022	Portugal U21	1	(0)
2022–	Portugal	21	(0)
Medal record
Men's football
Representing Portugal
UEFA Nations League
Winner	2025 Germany
- * Club domestic league appearances and goals as of 21:44, 21 November 2026 (UTC) ‡ National team caps and goals as of 23:00, 17 November 2026 (UTC)

António João Pereira de Albuquerque Tavares da Silva (European Portuguese pronunciation: [ɐ̃ˈtɔni.u ˈsilvɐ, ɐ̃ˈtɔnju -]; born 30 October 2003) is a Portuguese professional footballer who plays as a centre-back for Premier League club Bournemouth and the Portugal national team.

Coming through Benfica's youth system, Silva impressed during his time with the reserve side, winning the UEFA Youth League in 2021–22, being an instrumental part of Benfica's first European trophy in 60 years. He was subsequently promoted to the first-team, making his professional debut at age 18, where he helped Benfica win the league title in his first season with them.

Silva is a former Portugal youth international, representing his country at various levels. He made his senior international debut in 2022, being part of the squad at the 2022 FIFA World Cup and UEFA Euro 2024.

== Club career ==
=== Benfica ===
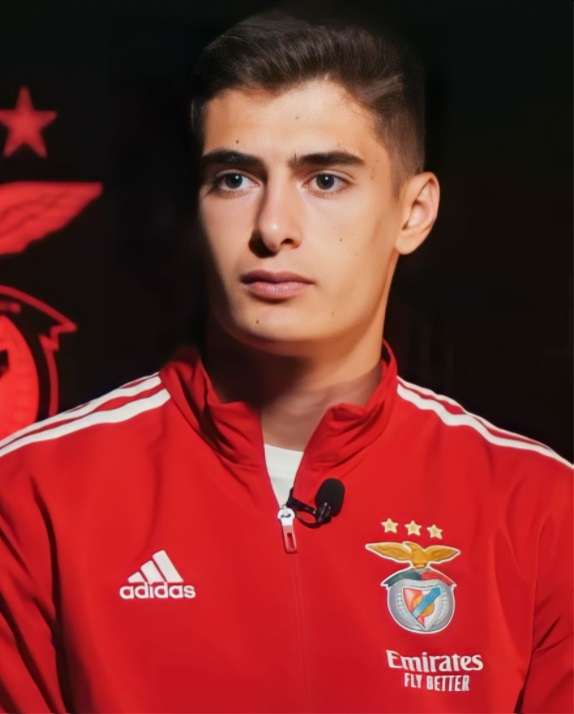
Silva with Benfica in 2022

==== Early career ====
Born in Viseu, Silva began his youth career with hometown club Viseu United, aged 11, and also had spells at Penalva do Castelo and Repesenses. He quickly stood out, subsequently began having multiple training sessions with Sporting CP, while Porto also showed an interest in signing him, but he ended up joining their rivals and his boyhood club Benfica's youth academy in 2016. Struggling with homesickness, Silva returned to his hometown to spend time with his family, but with the help of the club's psychologist, he managed to overcome his mental health problems and went back to Benfica a year later, after adjusting to life in Lisbon.

==== 2021–22: Youth League and development ====
On 28 November 2021, Silva signed his first professional contract with Benfica B. He made his professional debut with Benfica B in a 2–1 LigaPro loss to Mafra on 2 April 2022. During that season, Silva played a major role in the 2021–22 UEFA Youth League, where Benfica U19 topped their group against Dynamo Kyiv, Barcelona and Bayern Munich. In the final phases, he scored the equaliser in a 3–2 win over Midtjylland, after his side were two goals behind and in the final, he helped his side keep a clean sheet in a 6–0 win over Red Bull Salzburg to help Benfica win their first Youth League title, and their first title in European football since the 1961–62 European Cup.

==== 2022–23: First-team breakthrough and league title ====
Having appeared for the club's B team, it was expected that Silva would spend the 2022–23 season continuing his development there, but he began training with the first team, after impressing newly arrived coach Roger Schmidt, which led him to progress in the team's centre-backs ranks, ahead of Tomás Araujo and Jan Vertonghen, who was away on international duty for Belgium. Following the suspension of Nicolás Otamendi, he was given his first start by the new coach on 27 August, being entrusted in the centre defence, alongside Morato, and putting a strong performance, in a 3–0 away win over Boavista in the Primeira Liga. He subsequently became a starter following an injury crisis at the club, leading Silva to fill the void alongside Otamendi, who was the only fit centre-back available. On 5 September, he agreed to a contract extension to 2027, increasing his buyout clause to €100 million. The following day, Silva made his UEFA Champions League debut, partnering with Nicolás Otamendi in the centre of defence, keeping a clean sheet in a 2–0 home win over Maccabi Haifa.

Silva was named the league's Defender of the Month for September, after helping Benfica maintaining their unbeaten run, which included three clean sheets. On 25 October, Silva scored his first goal for the club, opening Benfica's 4–3 home victory over Juventus in a 2022–23 UEFA Champions League group stage match. His form throughout the club's Champions League group stage campaign, saw him help his side qualify to the round of sixteen, as group winners, following a 6–1 away win over Maccabi Haifa on 2 November. Four days later, Silva scored his first league goals, netting a brace in a 5–1 victory against Estoril. This saw him being the league's Defender of the Month for the months of October and November.

Over the course of the domestic campaign, Silva started and completed almost every minute for Benfica, playing a major part in their campaign, sealing Benfica's first title in four years on the final day of the league campaign, following a 3–0 win over Santa Clara.

==== 2023–26: Dip in form and return to starting place ====
In the 2023–24 season, Benfica endured a difficult start of the new campaign, after a 2–0 home loss to Red Bull Salzburg in a Champions League group stage match, where Silva was sent off for the first time in his career for a second bookable offense at the start first half for an handball, after Roko Šimić's shot touched his hand. His performances recovered later in the season with Silva being named the defender of the month for the months of October and November, but he was sent off for the second time in the Champions League, receiving a straight red card for a two-footed challenge on Nicolò Barella during a Inter Milan counter-attack in their 3–3 home draw on 29 November. The booking meant that Silva would miss Benfica's last group stage match away against Red Bull Salzburg, which they eventually won 3–1, qualifying to the UEFA Europa League knock-out round play-offs.

Over the course of the 2023–24 campaign, Silva started and completed almost every minute for Benfica, as they were knocked out in the UEFA Europa League quarter-finals to Marseille on penalties following a 2–2 draw on aggregate and finished as the league runners-up to crosstown rivals Sporting CP.

The following season, with the arrival of new manager Bruno Lage, Silva lost his place in Benfica's starting XI to Tomás Araújo, primarily due to tactical considerations by his manager, as Araújo's superior passing ability in building play from the back and speed, despite Silva remaining a strong option for his manager. However, towards the end of the season, he regained his place, after impressing in the 2025 FIFA Club World Cup.

=== Bournemouth ===
On 1 August 2026, Silva signed for Bournemouth in the Premier League in a deal reportedly worth up £26 million.

== International career ==
Silva represented Portugal at under-16, under-17, under-18 and under-19, for a total of 18 caps, serving as captain for the latter. On 24 September 2022, Silva made his under-21 debut, replacing André Amaro in a 4–1 friendly defeat of Georgia.

In October 2022, he was named in Portugal's preliminary 55-man squad for the 2022 FIFA World Cup in Qatar, being included in the final 26-man squad for the tournament. He made his senior international debut in a friendly against Nigeria on 17 November, starting in Portugal's 4–0 win. With Portugal having secured qualification from their group, he started in the last fixture, featuring in the 2–1 loss to South Korea in Al Rayyan. In doing so, he became the youngest player ever to represent Portugal at the World Cup at 19 years, one months and three days old.

On 21 May 2024, he was selected in the 26-man squad for the UEFA Euro 2024. After Portugal secured qualification from their group, he made his debut in the competition, starting in the last fixture against Georgia. In the match, he committed an error leading to Georgia's first goal before he conceded a penalty, resulting in a 2–0 for Portugal, earning various criticisms for his performance. He would not feature for Portugal in the knockout stage as they were eliminated from the tournament in the quarter-finals after losing to France 5–3 in a penalty shootout.

Silva was called up to the Portugal senior team on 20 May 2025, for the 2025 UEFA Nations League Finals that were played in June, being part of the team that won the tournament, despite not making an appearance.

== Style of play ==
Silva is right-footed central defender usually perceived as having a high tactical intelligence, and ability to read the game. Comfortable with both feet, he also shows proficiency when distributing the ball, whether maintaining possession, switching play, or breaking lines with vertical passes. His defensive strengths include anticipation, marking, and positional awareness, while his mobility and technical skills enable him to contribute effectively both defensively and in transition.

Silva is also recognized for his leadership qualities, with former Portuguese international Abel Xavier depicting his "security, maturity, game vision, assertiveness, aggression, and leadership". Xavier emphasized that, regardless of his age, Silva has the potential to be the future captain of Benfica. Silva admires Cristiano Ronaldo and Benfica legend Luisão and has also mentioned that he considers Rúben Dias, Antonio Rüdiger and Virgil van Dijk as inspirations.

== Career statistics ==
=== Club ===
As of match played 21 November 2026

Appearances and goals by club, season and competition
Club	Season	League			National cup (Note: Includes Taça de Portugal, FA Cup)		League cup (Note: Includes Taça da Liga, EFL Cup)		Europe		Other		Total	
Club	Season	Division	Apps	Goals	Apps	Goals	Apps	Goals	Apps	Goals	Apps	Goals	Apps	Goals
Benfica B	2021–22	Liga Portugal 2	2	0	—		—		—		—		2	0
Benfica B	2022–23	Liga Portugal 2	2	0	—		—		—		—		2	0
Benfica B	Total		4	0	—		—		—		—		4	0
Benfica	2022–23	Primeira Liga	30	3	3	0	1	0	10 (Note: Appearances in UEFA Champions League)	2	—		44	5
Benfica	2023–24	Primeira Liga	30	2	6	0	3	0	10 (Note: Four appearances in UEFA Champions League, six appearances in UEFA Europa League)	0	1 (Note: Appearance in Supertaça Cândido de Oliveira)	0	50	2
Benfica	2024–25	Primeira Liga	23	1	7	1	3	0	9	0	4 (Note: Appearances in FIFA Club World Cup)	0	46	2
Benfica	2025–26	Primeira Liga	25	1	4	0	1	0	10	0	1	0	41	1
Benfica	2026–27	Primeira Liga	—		—		—		2 (Note: Appearances in UEFA Europa League)	0	—		2	0
Benfica	Total		108	7	20	1	8	0	41	2	6	0	183	10
Bournemouth	2026–27	Premier League	11	0	0	0	2	0	3	0	—		16	0
Career total			123	7	20	1	10	0	44	2	6	0	203	10

=== International ===
As of match played 17 November 2026

Appearances and goals by national team and year
National team	Year	Apps	Goals
Portugal	2022	2	0
Portugal	2023	5	0
Portugal	2024	10	0
Portugal	2025	1	0
Portugal	2026	3	0
Total		21	0

== Honours ==
Benfica B

- Campeonato Nacional de Juniores: 2021–22
- UEFA Youth League: 2021–22

Benfica

- Primeira Liga: 2022–23
- Taça da Liga: 2024–25
- Supertaça Cândido de Oliveira: 2023, 2025

Portugal

- UEFA Nations League: 2024–25

Individual

- Cosme Damião Awards – Revelation of the Year: 2022
- Cosme Damião Awards – Footballer of the Year: 2023
- Primeira Liga Team of the Year: 2022–23
- IFFHS Men's World Youth (U20) Team: 2023
- SJPF Young Player of the Month: October 2023
- Primeira Liga Defender of the Month: October/November 2023, February 2024,
