= Mihailo Ristić (footballer) =

Serbian footballer

Mihailo Ristić Михаило Ристић
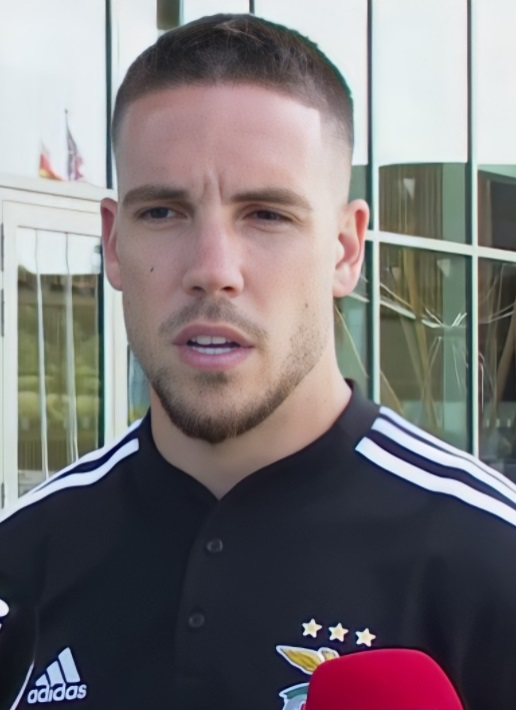
- Ristić with Benfica in 2022

Personal information
- Date of birth: 31 October 1995 (age 31)
- Place of birth: Bijeljina, Bosnia and Herzegovina
- Height: 1.82 m (6 ft 0 in)
- Positions: Left-back; left wing-back; centre-back

Team information
- Current team: Red Star Belgrade
- Number: 23

Youth career
- 2010−2012: Rudar Ugljevik
- 2013−2014: Red Star Belgrade

Senior career*
Years	Team	Apps	(Gls)
2013−2017	Red Star Belgrade	78	(7)
2017–2018	Krasnodar	4	(0)
2018	→ Sparta Prague (loan)	3	(0)
2019–2022	Montpellier	91	(2)
2022–2023	Benfica	8	(1)
2023–2026	Celta	27	(0)
2026–	Red Star Belgrade	4	(0)

International career^{‡}
2013−2014	Serbia U19	8	(0)
2014	Serbia U20	1	(0)
2016−2017	Serbia U21	8	(0)
2020–	Serbia	9	(0)
- * Club domestic league appearances and goals as of 26 October 2026 ‡ National team caps and goals as of 3 September 2023

Mihailo Ristić (Serbian Cyrillic: Михаило Ристић, pronounced [rǐːstitɕ]; born 31 October 1995) is a Serbian professional footballer who plays as a left-back or left wing-back for Serbian Superliga club Red Star Belgrade and the Serbia national team

== Club career ==
=== Red Star Belgrade ===
Born in Bijeljina, Ristić played with Partizan Donja Trnova and Rudar Ugljevik during his youth career, before he moved to Red Star Belgrade, in early 2013 thanks to a scouting search. He became one of the best players in Red Star's youth teams in shortly time, and was called to the first team under coach Ricardo Sá Pinto for the last league fixture of the 2012–13 season against Vojvodina. Although he did not make a deby on that match, he was on the bench during the game.

After the end of his youth career, Ristić signed his first professional contract with Red Star Belgrade in July 2014. He made his Serbian SuperLiga debut for Red Star Belgrade on 9 August 2014, under coach Nenad Lalatović, when he replaced Vukan Savićević in the 82 minute in a 2–0 win against Radnički Niš. During the season, he was mostly used as a defensive midfielder.

After Miodrag Božović became the first coach of the Red Star Belgrade, Ristić started 2015–16 season as a back-up player. He also changed several positions on the field, playing as a central and left midfielder or as a left-back in some occasions. At the beginning of 2016–17 season, Mihailo definitely changed his position, but he also changed his jersey number and took 73 (He had worn 24 & 36 previously). After Luis Ibáñez left the club, Ristić became the first choice as a left-back, which he justified making two assists in the 3rd fixture of the 2016–17 Serbian SuperLiga season against Mladost Lučani. On 14 September 2016, Ristić extended his contract with club until summer 2020.

=== Krasnodar ===
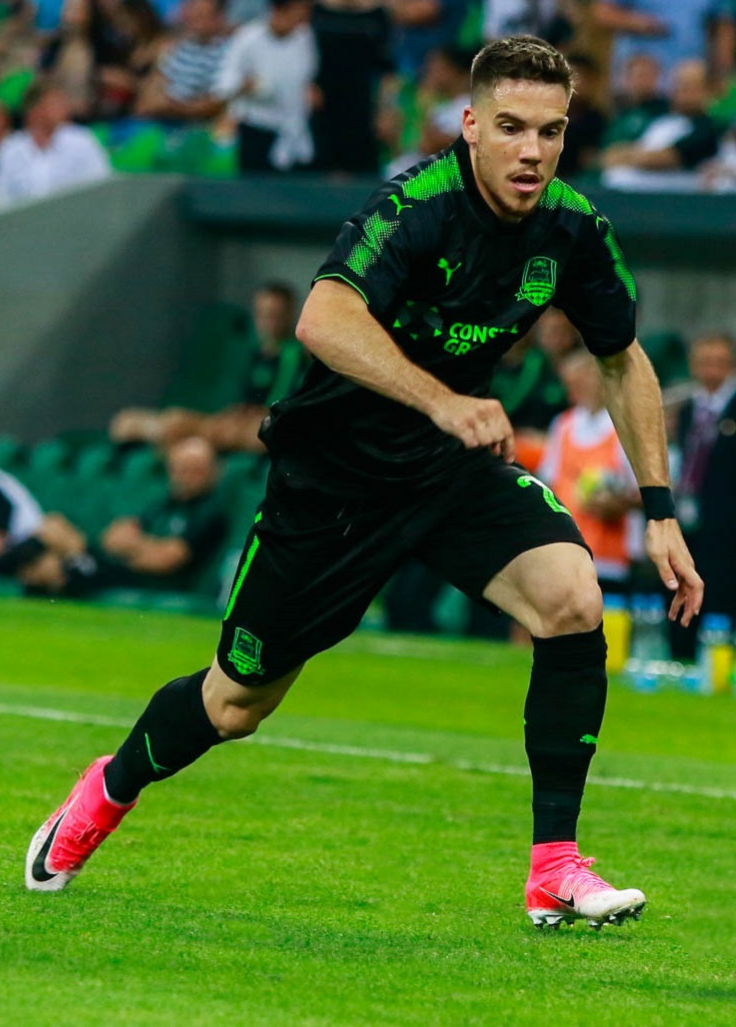
Ristić in action for Krasnodar in 2017

On 30 June 2017, Ristić signed a five-year contract with the Russian Premier League club Krasnodar. The reported fee is believed to be around €2 million plus 20 percent of the future transfer.

Ristić made his debut for new club in the first leg of third qualifying round for 2017–18 UEFA Europa League, in a 2–1 home victory against Lyngby Boldklub on 27 July 2017. On 17 August 2017, in the first leg match of the play-off round for 2017–18 UEFA Europa League Ristić scored from a long distance against his former club Red Star. However, neither the referee nor the linesman saw it as a goal, and play was continued. The final score was a 3–2 win for Krasnodar.

On 2 February 2018, Ristić returned to Czech club Sparta Prague on a one-year loan deal with an option to buy.

=== Later career ===
Ristić joined French club Montpellier on 12 January 2019. On 26 May 2022, he officially signed for Primeira Liga club Benfica on a free transfer. Ristić made his Primeira Liga debut on 27 August, replacing Alejandro Grimaldo in the 91st minute in a 3–0 away victory against Boavista. He scored his first goal for the club on 6 November, closing Benfica's 5–1 victory against Estoril.

On 1 September 2023, Ristić signed a three-year contract with La Liga club Celta, for a fee of €1.5 million, which could rise to €3 million with add-ons.

== International career ==
Ristić was a member of Serbia national under-19 football team between 2013 and 2014. During that period, Ristić played as a left-back in some matches. He was also called into U20 squad under coach Veljko Paunović in 2015, but he later missed FIFA U-20 World Cup because of tonsillectomy. Selector of Serbia national under-23 football team, Milan Rastavac invited him to squad for a revival match against Qatar in December 2015. Ristić was called, and made his debut for Serbia U21 team in a match against Andorra, played in March 2016. Coach Slavoljub Muslin invited Ristić for a friendly match of the Serbia national football team against Qatar in September 2016.

On 11 October 2020, Ristić debuted for the Serbia national football team in a 3-0 friendly loss against Qatar alongside Dušan Vlahović.

== Career statistics ==
=== Club ===
As of match played 15 October 2026

Appearances and goals by club, season and competition
Club	Season	League			National cup (Note: Includes Serbian Cup, Russian Cup, Coupe de France and Taça de Portugal)		League cup (Note: Includes Coupe de la Ligue and Taça da Liga)		Continental		Other		Total	
Club	Season	Division	Apps	Goals	Apps	Goals	Apps	Goals	Apps	Goals	Apps	Goals	Apps	Goals
Red Star Belgrade	2013–14	Serbian SuperLiga	0	0	0	0	—		0	0	—		0	0
Red Star Belgrade	2014–15	Serbian SuperLiga	23	2	2	0	—		—		—		25	2
Red Star Belgrade	2015–16	Serbian SuperLiga	29	2	2	0	—		1	0	—		32	2
Red Star Belgrade	2016–17	Serbian SuperLiga	26	3 (Note: Does not include a goal scored against Javor Ivanjica in 36th fixture, wrongly attributed to him by Soccerway)	5	0	—		3	0	—		34	3
Red Star Belgrade	Total		78	7	9	0	—		4	0	—		91	7
Krasnodar	2017–18	Russian Premier League	4	0	1	0	—		3	0	—		8	0
Sparta Prague (loan)	2017–18	Czech First League	2	0	0	0	—		0	0	—		2	0
Sparta Prague (loan)	2018–19	Czech First League	1	0	0	0	—		1	0	—		2	0
Sparta Prague (loan)	Total		3	0	0	0	—		1	0	—		4	0
Montpellier	2018–19	Ligue 1	10	1	0	0	0	0	—		—		10	1
Montpellier	2019–20	Ligue 1	18	0	1	0	2	0	—		—		21	0
Montpellier	2020–21	Ligue 1	34	0	3	0	0	0	—		—		37	0
Montpellier	2021–22	Ligue 1	29	1	2	1	0	0	—		—		31	2
Montpellier	Total		91	2	6	1	2	0	—		—		99	3
Benfica	2022–23	Primeira Liga	7	1	2	0	1	0	0	0	—		10	1
Benfica	2023–24	Primeira Liga	1	0	0	0	0	0	0	0	1 (Note: Appearance in Supertaça Cândido de Oliveira)	0	2	0
Benfica	Total		8	1	2	0	1	0	0	0	1	0	12	1
Celta	2023–24	La Liga	12	0	3	0	—		—		—		15	0
Celta	2024–25	La Liga	10	0	2	0	—		—		—		12	0
Celta	2025–26	La Liga	5	0	3	0	—		6 (Note: Appearances in UEFA Europa League)	0	—		14	0
Celta	Total		27	0	8	0	—		6	0	—		41	0
Red Star Belgrade	2026–27	Serbian SuperLiga	3	0	0	0	—		1 (Note: Appearances in UEFA Conference League)	0	—		4	0
Career total			214	10	26	1	3	0	15	0	1	0	257	11

=== International ===
As of 5 June 2022

Appearances and goals by national team and year
National team	Year	Apps	Goals
Serbia	2016	1	0
Serbia	2017	0	0
Serbia	2018	0	0
Serbia	2019	0	0
Serbia	2020	4	0
Serbia	2021	2	0
Serbia	2022	2	0
Total		9	0

== Honours ==
Red Star Belgrade

- Serbian SuperLiga: 2013–14, 2015–16
- Serbian Cup runner-up: 2016–17

Benfica

- Primeira Liga: 2022–23
- Supertaça Cândido de Oliveira: 2023
