= 2023 Supertaça Cândido de Oliveira =

Supertaça Cândido de Oliveira Vodafone
- Event: Supertaça Cândido de Oliveira (Portuguese Super Cup)
Benfica	Porto
2	0
- Date: 9 August 2023
- Venue: Estádio Municipal de Aveiro, Aveiro
- Man of the Match: Ángel Di María (Benfica)
- Referee: Luís Godinho
- Attendance: 30,300

The 2023 Supertaça Cândido de Oliveira was the 45th edition of the Supertaça Cândido de Oliveira. It was played between the winners of the 2022–23 Primeira Liga, Benfica, and the winners of the 2022–23 Taça de Portugal, Porto, on 9 August 2023. Benfica won the match 2–0 to secure their 9th Supertaça title.

== Venue ==
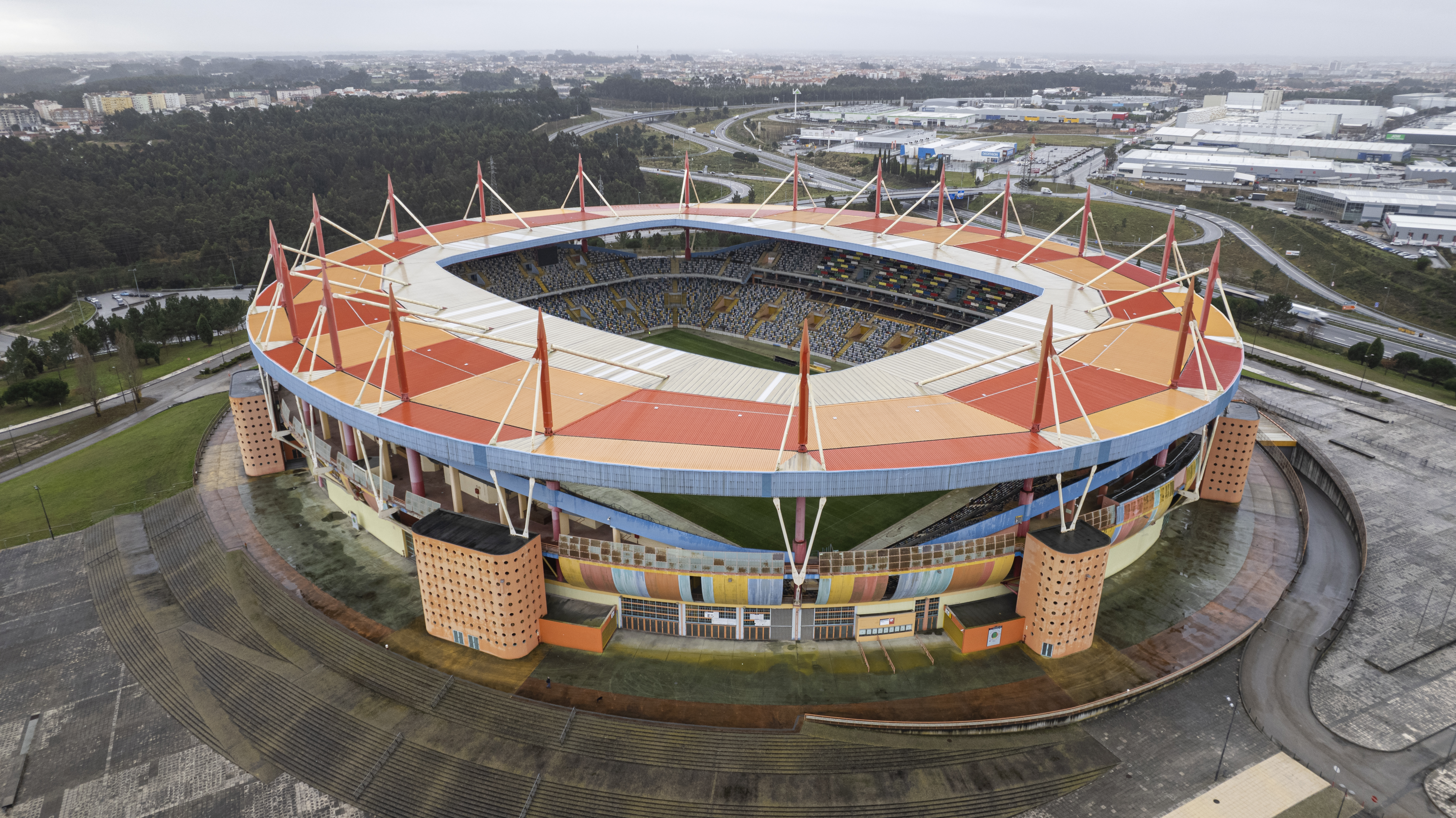
Estádio Municipal de Aveiro

This was the thirteenth time the Supertaça was played at the Estádio Municipal de Aveiro, having hosted all Supertaça matches but two since 2009, both of them played at Estádio Algarve, in 2015 and 2019.

== Match ==
=== Details ===
9 August 2023
20:45 WEST (UTC+01:00)

Benfica	2–0	Porto
Di María 61'; Musa 68'	Report

Estádio Municipal de Aveiro, Aveiro
Attendance: 30,300
Referee: Luís Godinho

Benfica	Porto

GK	99	(Greece) Odysseas Vlachodimos	(yellow card) 87'
LB	23	(Serbia) Mihailo Ristić	(yellow card) 15'	(substituted off) 46'
CB	30	(Argentina) Nicolás Otamendi (c)
CB	4	(Portugal) António Silva
RB	12	(Denmark) Alexander Bah	(yellow card) 43'
RM	10	(Turkey) Orkun Kökçü	(yellow card) 27'	(substituted off) 70'
LM	87	(Portugal) João Neves	(yellow card) 49'	(substituted off) 75'
LW	20	(Portugal) João Mário		(substituted off) 46'
CF	8	(Norway) Fredrik Aursnes
RW	11	(Argentina) Ángel Di María		(substituted off) 90+12'
FW	27	(Portugal) Rafa Silva
Substitutes:
CF	22	(Portugal) Chiquinho	(yellow card) 84'	(substituted on) 75'
DF	61	(Portugal) Florentino Luís		(substituted on) 70'
CM	38	(Brazil) João Victor
LB	13	(Czech Republic) David Jurásek		(substituted on) 46'
CB	91	(Brazil) Morato
FW	33	(Croatia) Petar Musa		(substituted on) 46'
RW	21	(Norway) Andreas Schjelderup		(substituted on) 90+12'
GK	29	(Portugal) Samuel Soares
FW	19	(Denmark) Casper Tengstedt
Manager:
(Germany) Roger Schmidt

GK	99	(Portugal) Diogo Costa
LB	19	(Nigeria) Zaidu Sanusi	(yellow card) 55'	(substituted off) 81'
CB	4	(Spain) Iván Marcano
CB	3	(Portugal) Pepe (c)	(yellow card) 33' (red card) 90+1'
RB	11	(Brazil) Pepê	(yellow card) 45+1'
LM	13	(Brazil) Galeno
CM	5	(Canada) Stephen Eustáquio	(yellow card) 51'	(substituted off) 65'
CM	8	(Serbia) Marko Grujić		(substituted off) 69'
RM	25	(Brazil) Otávio
LW	9	(Iran) Mehdi Taremi		(substituted off) 81'
RW	9	(England) Danny Loader	(yellow card) 29'	(substituted off) 65'
Substitutes:
CM	28	(Portugal) Romário Baró		(substituted on) 65'
CB	2	(Portugal) Fábio Cardoso
GK	14	(Portugal) Cláudio Ramos
CF	20	(Portugal) André Franco
LB	70	(Portugal) Gonçalo Borges		(substituted on) 81'
CM	23	(Portugal) João Mário		(substituted on) 69'
RW	29	(Spain) Toni Martínez		(substituted on) 65'
LW	21	(Spain) Fran Navarro		(substituted on) 81'
CM	16	(Spain) Nico González
Manager:
(Portugal) Sérgio Conceição			(red card) 90+7'

Match rules
- 90 minutes.
- 30 minutes of extra time if necessary.
- Penalty shoot-out if scores still level.
- Seven named substitutes, of which up to five may be used during regular time.

== See also ==
- O Clássico
- 2023–24 Primeira Liga
- 2023–24 Taça de Portugal
- 2023–24 Taça da Liga
- 2023–24 FC Porto season
- 2023–24 S.L. Benfica season
