= Casper Tengstedt =

Danish footballer (born 2000)

Personal information
- Date of birth: 1 June 2000 (age 26)
- Place of birth: Herning, Denmark
- Height: 1.84 m (6 ft 0 in)
- Positions: Winger; forward

Team information
- Current team: Toulouse
- Number: 20

Youth career
- Viborg Søndermarken
- –2015: Viborg
- 2015–2019: Midtjylland

Senior career*
Years	Team	Apps	(Gls)
2019–2021	Midtjylland	0	(0)
2019–2020	→ 1. FC Nürnberg II (loan)	10	(5)
2020–2021	→ Horsens (loan)	24	(3)
2021–2022	Horsens	29	(15)
2022–2023	Rosenborg	14	(15)
2023	Benfica B	4	(0)
2023–2025	Benfica	21	(4)
2024–2025	→ Hellas Verona (loan)	25	(6)
2025–2026	Feyenoord	18	(3)
2026–	Toulouse	2	(1)

International career
2017	Denmark U17	2	(0)
2019	Denmark U19	4	(2)
2021–2022	Denmark U21	5	(1)
- * Club domestic league appearances and goals as of 15 September 2026

Casper Tengstedt (born 1 June 2000) is a Danish professional footballer who plays as a winger or forward for Ligue 1 club Toulouse.

== Club career ==
After playing for Viborg Søndermarken and Viborg FF, he signed for FC Midtjylland in 2015. Tengstedt signed a three-year contract extension in November 2017.

In September 2019 he signed on loan for German club 1. FC Nürnberg II. In August 2020 he moved on loan to AC Horsens. In June 2021, Tengstedt signed a permanent deal with the club. On 1 August 2022, Tengstedt signed for Norwegian club Rosenborg.

=== Benfica ===
After scoring 15 goals and providing 7 assists in 14 league matches for Rosenborg, Tengstedt was sold to Portuguese club Benfica in January 2023, signing a contract until 2028.

He made his debut for the club on 12 March, coming on as a substitute in extra time during a 3–0 victory away at Marítimo, in the Primeira Liga. Tengstedt scored his first goal for Benfica on 19 August 2023, in a league match at Estádio da Luz against Estrela da Amadora; one minute after coming off the bench to replace Arthur Cabral, with the game tied 0–0, he scored the opener, paving the way for a 2–0 victory for Benfica. A month later, on 20 September, Tengstedt made his UEFA Champions League debut, coming on as a substitute for the final minutes of a 2–0 home loss to Red Bull Salzburg, in the competition's group stage. On 12 November, he scored the 97th-minute winner in a 2–1 league victory at home to local rivals Sporting CP. On 29 November, Tengstedt made three assists, all to João Mário, in a 3–3 Champions League group stage draw at home to Inter Milan. On 17 December, he scored the only goal of the match in a league victory away at Braga.

==== Loan to Hellas Verona ====
On 9 August 2024, Tengstedt joined Serie A side Hellas Verona on loan with an option to buy. A day later, he made his debut, scoring a goal in a 2–1 defeat against Cesena in the Coppa Italia.

=== Feyenoord ===
On 24 July 2025, Tengstedt joined Dutch side Feyenoord on a four-year contract. Later that year, on 6 December, he scored his first goal for the club in a 6–1 victory over PEC Zwolle.

=== Toulouse ===
On 1 September 2026, Tengstedt signed for Ligue 1 club Toulouse.

== International career ==
Tengstedt has represented Denmark at under-17, under-19 and under-21 youth levels.

== Personal life ==
His father is Thomas Tengstedt, who was also a professional footballer.

== Career statistics ==
As of match played 12 September 2026

Appearances and goals by club, season and competition
Club	Season	League			National cup (Note: Includes Danish Cup, Norwegian Football Cup and Taça de Portugal)		League cup (Note: Includes Taça da Liga)		Other		Total	
Club	Season	Division	Apps	Goals	Apps	Goals	Apps	Goals	Apps	Goals	Apps	Goals
1. FC Nürnberg II (loan)	2019–20	Regionalliga	10	5	—		—		—		10	5
Horsens (loan)	2020–21	Danish Superliga	24	3	1	0	—		—		25	3
Horsens	2021–22	Danish 1st Division	26	15	1	0	—		—		27	15
Horsens	2022–23	Superliga	3	0	—		—		—		3	0
Horsens	Total		29	15	1	0	0	0	0	0	30	15
Rosenborg	2022	Eliteserien	14	15	—		—		—		14	15
Benfica B	2022–23	Liga Portugal 2	4	0	—		—		—		4	0
Benfica	2022–23	Primeira Liga	4	0	0	0	—		0	0	4	0
Benfica	2023–24	Primeira Liga	17	4	4	0	2	0	8 (Note: Appearance(s) in UEFA Champions League)	0	31	4
Benfica	2024–25	Primeira Liga	0	0	0	0	0	0	0	0	0	0
Benfica	Total		21	4	4	0	2	0	8	0	35	4
Hellas Verona (loan)	2024–25	Serie A	25	6	1	1	—		—		26	7
Feyenoord	2025–26	Eredivisie	18	3	0	0	—		5 (Note: Two appearances in UEFA Champions League, three appearances and two goals in UEFA Europa League)	2	23	5
Toulouse	2026–27	Ligue 1	2	1	0	0	—		0	0	2	1
Career total			147	52	7	1	2	0	13	2	166	55

== Honours ==
Horsens

- Danish 1st Division: 2021–22

Benfica

- Primeira Liga: 2022–23
- Supertaça Cândido de Oliveira: 2023

Individual

- Eliteserien Player of the Month: August 2022, October 2022
