= Odysseas Vlachodimos =

Greek footballer (born 1994)

Odysseas Vlachodimos Οδυσσέας Βλαχοδήμος
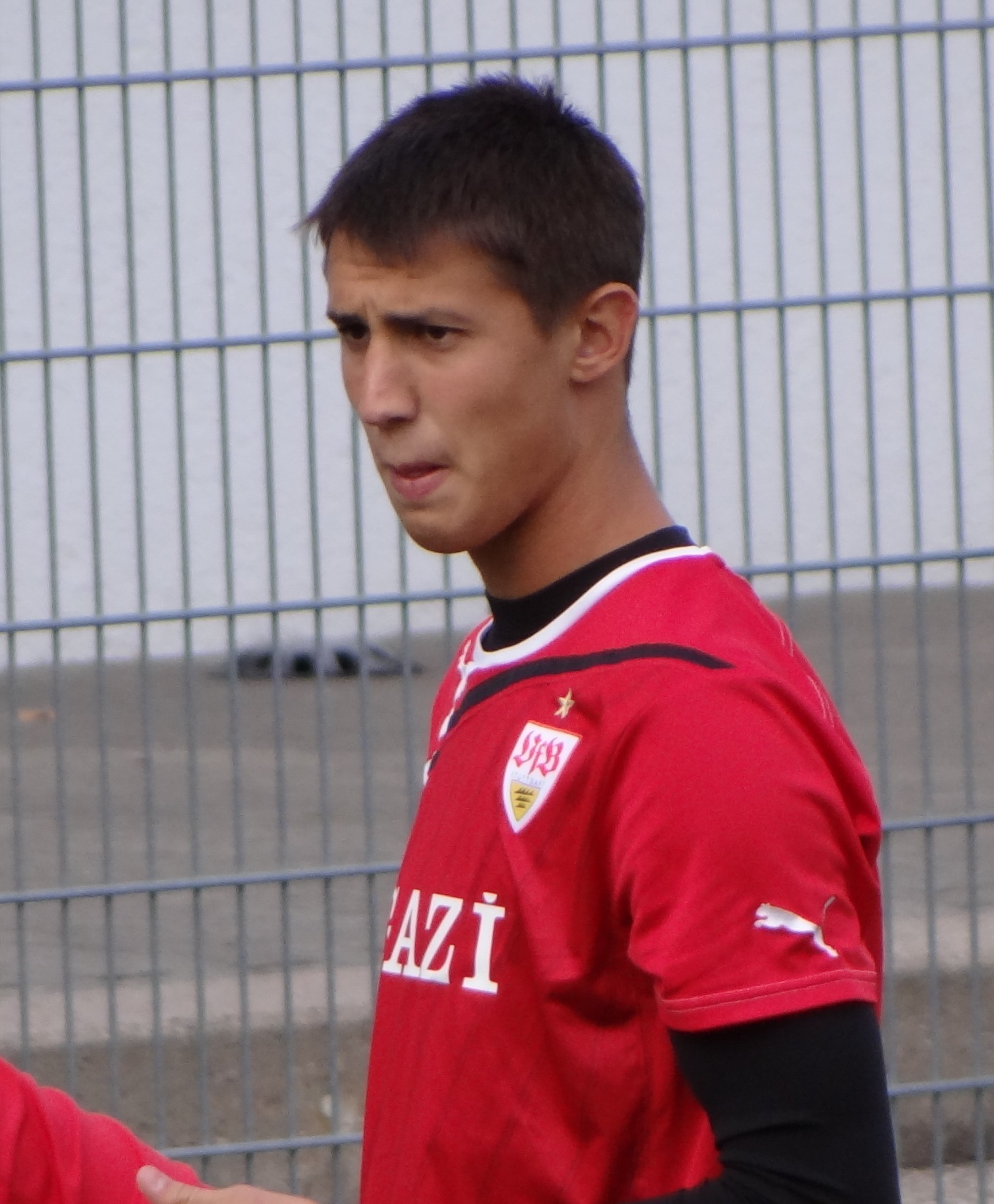
- Vlachodimos with VfB Stuttgart in 2012

Personal information
- Full name: Odysseas Vlachodimos
- Date of birth: 26 April 1994 (age 32)
- Place of birth: Stuttgart, Germany
- Height: 1.88 m (6 ft 2 in)
- Position: Goalkeeper

Team information
- Current team: Sevilla (on loan from Newcastle United)
- Number: 1

Youth career
- 2000–2002: VfL Wangen
- 2002–2013: VfB Stuttgart

Senior career*
Years	Team	Apps	(Gls)
2012–2015	VfB Stuttgart II	68	(0)
2015–2016	VfB Stuttgart	3	(0)
2016–2018	Panathinaikos	52	(0)
2018–2023	Benfica	151	(0)
2023–2024	Nottingham Forest	5	(0)
2024–	Newcastle United	0	(0)
2025–	→ Sevilla (loan)	46	(0)

International career^{‡}
2009	Germany U14	1	(0)
2009	Germany U15	2	(0)
2009–2010	Germany U16	6	(0)
2010–2011	Germany U17	22	(0)
2012	Germany U18	3	(0)
2012–2013	Germany U19	11	(0)
2013–2014	Germany U20	3	(0)
2017	Germany U21	1	(0)
2018–	Greece	53	(0)
Medal record
Men's football
Representing Germany
European Under-17 Championship
Runner-up	2011
European Under-21 Championship
Winner	2017
FIFA U-17 World Cup
Bronze medal – third place	2011
- * Club domestic league appearances and goals as of 21 November 2026 ‡ National team caps and goals as of 12 June 2026

Odysseas Vlachodimos (Greek: Οδυσσέας Βλαχοδήμος, born 26 April 1994) is a professional footballer who plays as a goalkeeper for La Liga club Sevilla on loan from Premier League club Newcastle United. Born in Germany, he plays for the Greece national team.

== Club career ==
=== Stuttgart ===
Born in Stuttgart, Vlachodimos started his football career at VfL Wangen before joining VfB Stuttgart's youth system at the age of seven. Having progressed through the clubs' youth ranks, he then made his debut for VfB Stuttgart II on 25 February 2012 in a 1–0 loss to 1. FC Heidenheim in 3. Liga. At the end of the season, he signed his first professional contract with the club, penning a deal until June 2015. Two years later, he extended his contract with VfB until June 2017. Having made over 50 appearances for VfB Stuttgart II, Vlachodimos was afforded his Bundesliga debut against Eintracht Frankfurt on 29 August 2015. With back-up 'keeper Mitchell Langerak out injured, Vlachodimos was included in Stuttgart's match day squad and was brought on as a substitute following the sending off of first-choice goalkeeper Przemysław Tytoń. He made three appearances in total for the senior side but by the end of 2015 had fallen out of favour with new club manager, and former VfB Stuttgart II coach, Jürgen Kramny. Vlachodimos voiced his disapproval of the situation in an interview with German news publication Kicker in December and the following month joined Greek side Panathinaikos in the Super League, where he was reunited with his brother, Panagiotis, who had joined the club earlier that month.

=== Panathinaikos ===
On 26 January 2016, Stuttgart announced that Vlachodimos had completed a transfer to Panathinaikos. As part of the transfer, the full value of which remained undisclosed, it was agreed that Stuttgart would retain a 30% sell-on clause on Vlachodimos. He was handed his debut for the club on 3 April by manager Andrea Stramaccioni, and started in a 3–2 home win against Veria in the league. Having spent the majority of the first half of the following season behind regular keeper Luke Steele, Vlachodimos was handed his second start on 27 November and was named man of the match for his performance in a 1–1 draw against Panionios. He started again the following week and kept his first clean sheet for the club in a 1–0 win over PAOK. On 17 May, Vlachodimos was sent off in a play-off match against the same opposition for a spot in the following season's Champions League. PAOK's Amr Warda was dismissed minutes later before a brawl in the second half saw two more players sent off. During the incident, PAOK manager Vladimir Ivić was struck by a beer can thrown from the Panathinaikos crowd and required treatment, ultimately resulting in the match being abandoned.

=== Benfica ===
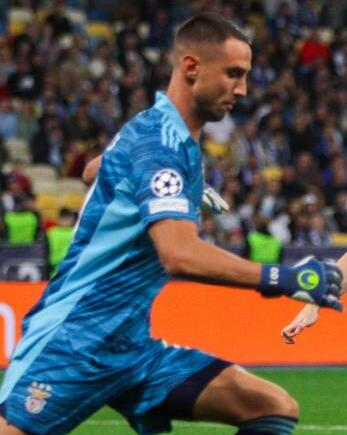
Vlachodimos with Benfica in 2021

On 18 May 2018, Vlachodimos signed a five-year contract with Portuguese side Benfica. After he arrived in Lisbon, teammate Bruno Varela seemed to be the first-choice goalkeeper for the 2018–19 season, but Vlachodimos' overall performance in the pre-season convinced manager Rui Vitória to promote him to the starting spot. That season, Vlachodimos was included in UEFA's Champions League breakthrough team of 2018 for making a "string of impressive saves" and being "one of Benfica's brightest sparks in a testing group stage campaign". On 3 February 2019, after 20 consecutive appearances with the club in Primeira Liga, he faced a red card as the last player for a foul committed to Bas Dost in a 4–2 away win over Lisbon rivals Sporting CP. Two weeks later, in the first leg of the UEFA Europa League round of 32 match against Galatasaray, Vlachodimos made a crucial save in the 85th minute to deny Christian Luyindama the equaliser, helping Benfica secure their first win in Turkey (2–1). He was elected Primeira Liga's Goalkeeper of the Month for February. During that month, he competed in four league matches, conceding two goals as Benfica defeated Sporting, Nacional (10–0), Aves (3–0) and Chaves (4–0). Moreover, he also helped his team eliminate Galatasaray 2–1 on aggregate in UEFA Europa League's Round of 32.

Vlachodimos started the 2019–20 season again as a first-choice. On 29 August 2019, he extended his contract with Benfica until 2023, setting an annual salary of €1.2 million. On 5 November 2019, Vlachodimos has been at his best in the Portuguese Primeira Liga for Benfica, recording eight clean sheets in the opening 10 matches of the season. Overall, if we take all competitions during 2019 into account, Vlachodimos participated in 46 matches for Benfica, recording 21 clean sheets. Only Jan Oblak (24) and Marco Bizot (29) gained more shutouts, while Marc-André ter Stegen also tallied 24 clean sheets.

On 5 October 2020, with the save of two consecutive penalty kicks from Ryan Gauld helped his team prevail over Farense with a score of 3–2, achieving the third victory in an equal number of matches in the beginning of the 2020–21 season. As a conclusion this season was a reality check for the 27-year-old as he played as a second fiddle to Helton Leite for most of the campaign. He has, however, regained his form and put up some excellent displays in the 2021–22 season. On 26 August 2021, Benfica qualified for the UEFA Champions League group stage after defeating PSV Eindhoven, a justification for the international Greek goalkeeper who in the summer was a step away from "Da Luz".

On 4 November 2021, although he conceded five goals in the 5–2 defeat to Bayern Munich, Pathodimos is included in the top 11 of the 4th matchday in the UEFA Champions League. On beginning of December 2021, Newcastle United are reportedly interested in signing highly coveted Vlachodimos. According to the Portuguese outlet O Jogo, Benfica could be battling to keep hold of their star goalkeeper with Newcastle United eyeing a January swoop for the Greek international. The Magpies have identified the 27-year-old as a top target and want to open discussions with the Portuguese giants in the coming weeks ahead of the January transfer window.

On 26 January 2022, the Portuguese press praised Vlachodimos for his performance in the victory of Benfica over Boavista in the 2021–22 Taça da Liga final, where the Greek goalkeeper was voted man of the match. Benfica were led to the penalty shootout with Boavista (1–1 in the regular game), where they prevailed 3–2, with the 27-year-old goalkeeper repelling three of the five penalties. In fact, this was the first participation of the Greek international in the tournament, while he is in Portugal, while he reached a total of 150 appearances with the Benfica jersey.

On 8 March 2023, the Greek goalkeeper signed a contract that runs until the summer of 2027, with the Portuguese "A Bola" reporting that the agreement between the two sides also includes a release clause of €60 million.

=== Nottingham Forest ===
On 31 August 2023, Vlachodimos signed for Premier League side Nottingham Forest on a four-year contract, for a fee of €4.9 million, with the potential to rise to €9.3 million with add-ons. Vlachodimos made his Premier League debut on 5 November 2023 against Aston Villa keeping a clean sheet in a 2–0 win.

=== Newcastle United ===
On 1 July 2024, Vlachodimos joined fellow Premier League club Newcastle United. He was signed for a fee of £20 million which is the most Newcastle have paid for a goalkeeper. He made his Newcastle United debut on 1 October 2024, replacing the injured Martin Dúbravka at half time in their 1–0 victory over AFC Wimbledon in the EFL Cup.

==== Loan to Sevilla ====
On 12 August 2025, Vlachodimos was loaned to La Liga side Sevilla for one year. On 1 July 2026, his loan was extended for a further season.

== International career ==
=== German national youth teams ===
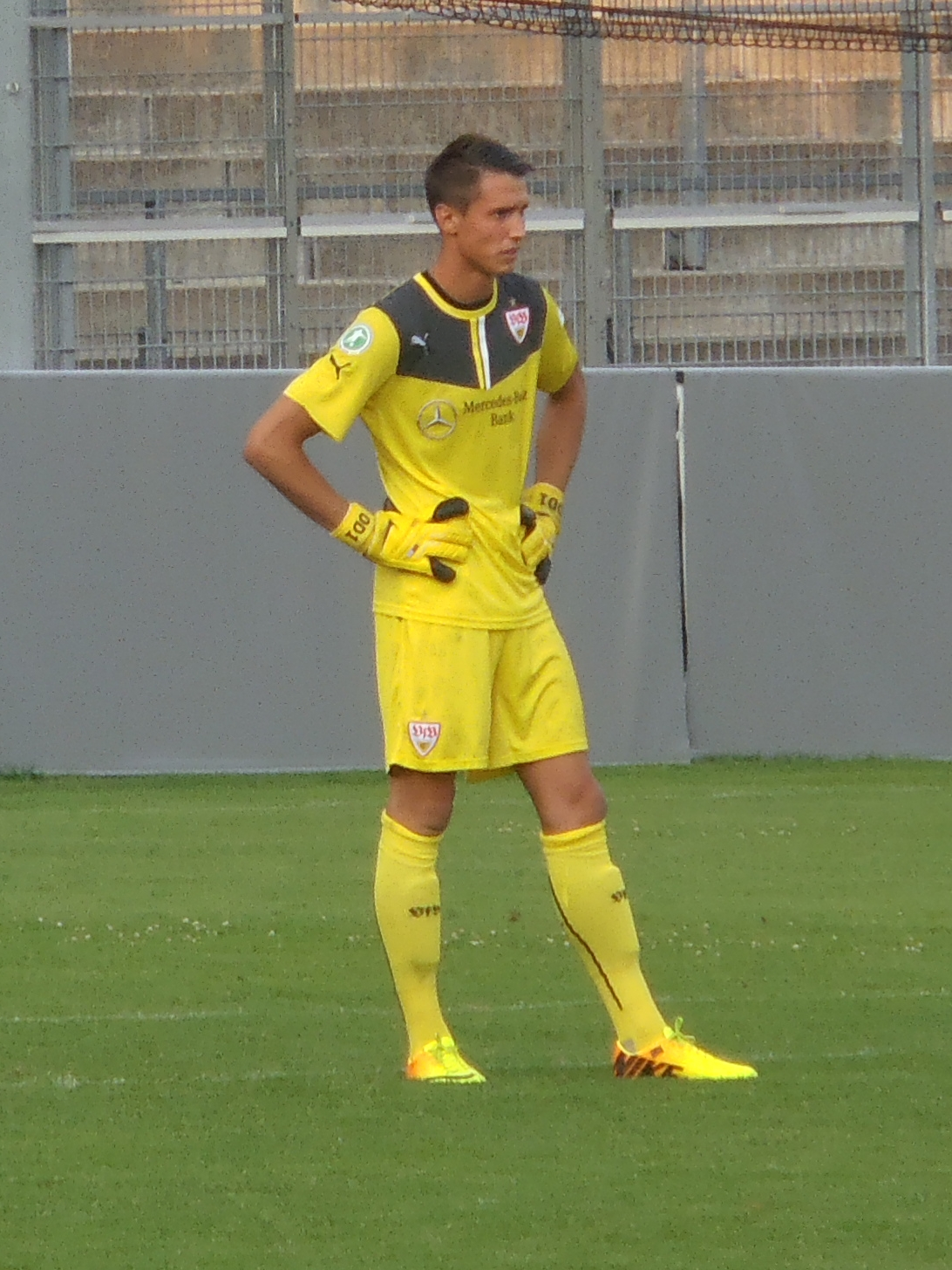
Vlachodimos during his time with VfB Stuttgart II

Vlachodimos represented Germany at various youth levels. His first experience with the national team came on 21 May 2009 when he made his debut for the U15's in a 2–0 win over the United States. He made one more appearance for the U15's against Poland the following month before making his U16 debut in August, starting in a 4–2 win over Switzerland in new manager Steffen Freund's first match in charge at the 2009 U16 Tournament in Liechteinstein. Vlachodimos featured regularly throughout the tournament as Germany claimed the title, beating Austria 6–2 in the final.

Two years later, Vlachodimos helped Germany to a runners-up finish at the 2011 UEFA European Under-17 Championship where they ultimately lost 5–2 to the Netherlands in the final. Soon after the tournament he was awarded the bronze U17 Fritz Walter Medal, awarded to the third best German under-17 player. Later in the year, he was part of the Germany squad which ended third at the 2011 FIFA U-17 World Cup. He made his debut for the U18 side in February 2012 before advancing to the U19 side in August. He then made his U20 debut on 12 October the following year against the Netherlands.

On 15 March 2017, following his emergence as Panathinaikos' first-choice goalkeeper, Vlachodimos was called up by Stefan Kuntz to the U21 side for friendly matches against England and Portugal. He was voted man of the match for his performance during Germany's 1–0 defeat against Portugal, despite the defeat being the nation's first home loss in 32 matches. Vlachodimos' strong performances at club with Panathinaikos saw him selected in Stefan Kuntz's squad for the 2017 UEFA European U21 final tournament in Poland. Germany were ultimately crowned champions, beating Spain 1–0 in the final to claim the title.

=== Greece ===
On 9 November 2018, four days after FIFA's approval of Vlachodimos' request to play for Greece, he was called up by Angelos Anastasiadis for the matches against Finland and Estonia in the UEFA Nations League. He debuted for Greece in a 1–0 win over Finland on 15 November that year.

== Personal life ==
His family hails from Kastania, Kozani.

Vlachodimos is the younger brother of Panagiotis, who is a former footballer.

== Career statistics ==
=== Club ===
As of match played 21 November 2026

Appearances and goals by club, season and competition
Club	Season	League			National cup (Note: Includes Greek Cup, Taça de Portugal, FA Cup, Copa del Rey)		League cup (Note: Includes Taça da Liga, EFL Cup)		Continental		Other		Total	
Club	Season	Division	Apps	Goals	Apps	Goals	Apps	Goals	Apps	Goals	Apps	Goals	Apps	Goals
VfB Stuttgart II	2011–12	3. Liga	3	0	—		—		—		—		3	0
VfB Stuttgart II	2012–13	3. Liga	12	0	—		—		—		—		12	0
VfB Stuttgart II	2013–14	3. Liga	23	0	—		—		—		—		23	0
VfB Stuttgart II	2014–15	3. Liga	31	0	—		—		—		—		31	0
VfB Stuttgart II	Total		68	0	—		—		—		—		68	0
VfB Stuttgart	2014–15	Bundesliga	0	0	0	0	—		—		—		0	0
VfB Stuttgart	2015–16	Bundesliga	3	0	0	0	—		—		—		3	0
VfB Stuttgart	Total		68	0	—		—		—		—		68	0
Panathinaikos	2015–16	Super League Greece	1	0	0	0	—		—		—		1	0
Panathinaikos	2016–17	Super League Greece	26	0	5	0	—		—		—		31	0
Panathinaikos	2017–18	Super League Greece	25	0	2	0	—		4 (Note: Appearances in UEFA Europa League)	0	—		31	0
Panathinaikos	Total		52	0	7	0	—		4	0	—		63	0
Benfica	2018–19	Primeira Liga	34	0	0	0	0	0	16 (Note: Six appearances in UEFA Champions League, ten appearances in UEFA Europa League)	0	—		50	0
Benfica	2019–20	Primeira Liga	33	0	3	0	0	0	8 (Note: Six appearances in UEFA Champions League, two appearances in UEFA Europa League)	0	1 (Note: Appearance in Supertaça Cândido de Oliveira)	0	45	0
Benfica	2020–21	Primeira Liga	18	0	2	0	0	0	5 (Note: One appearance in UEFA Champions League, four appearances in UEFA Europa League)	0	1	0	26	0
Benfica	2021–22	Primeira Liga	32	0	0	0	2	0	14 (Note: Appearances in UEFA Champions League)	0	—		48	0
Benfica	2022–23	Primeira Liga	34	0	3	0	3	0	14	0	—		54	0
Benfica	2023–24	Primeira Liga	1	0	—		—		—		1	0	2	0
Benfica	Total		152	0	8	0	5	0	57	0	3	0	225	0
Nottingham Forest	2023–24	Premier League	5	0	2	0	—		—		—		7	0
Newcastle United	2024–25	Premier League	0	0	0	0	1	0	—		—		1	0
Sevilla (loan)	2025–26	La Liga	33	0	1	0	—		—		—		34	0
Sevilla (loan)	2026–27	La Liga	13	0	0	0	—		—		—		13	0
Sevilla (loan)	Total		46	0	1	0	—		—		—		47	0
Career total			326	0	18	0	6	0	61	0	3	0	416	0

=== International ===
As of match played 7 June 2026

Appearances and goals by national team and year
National team	Year	Apps	Goals
Greece	2018	1	0
Greece	2019	5	0
Greece	2020	4	0
Greece	2021	11	0
Greece	2022	8	0
Greece	2023	10	0
Greece	2024	9	0
Greece	2025	3	0
Greece	2026	2	0
Total		53	0

== Honours ==
Benfica

- Primeira Liga: 2018–19, 2022–23
- Supertaça Cândido de Oliveira: 2019, 2023

Newcastle United

- EFL Cup: 2024–25

Germany U21

- UEFA European Under-21 Championship: 2017

Individual

- Fritz Walter Medal U17 Bronze: 2011
- Primeira Liga Player Fair-Play Prize: 2021–22
- La Liga Save of the Month: February 2026
