= Roger Schmidt (footballer) =

German footballer and manager

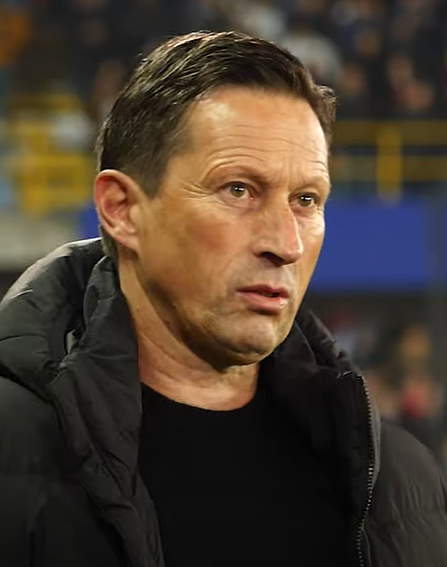
- Schmidt in 2023

Personal information
- Date of birth: 13 March 1967 (age 59)
- Place of birth: Kierspe, West Germany
- Height: 1.88 m (6 ft 2 in)
- Position: Midfielder

Youth career
- –1985: Kiersper SC

Senior career*
Years	Team	Apps	(Gls)
1986–1987	RW Lüdenscheid		
1988–1990	TuS Plettenberg		
1990–1995	TuS Paderborn-Neuhaus		
1995–2002	SC Verl	208	(54)
2002–2003	SC Paderborn 07	25	(2)
2003–2004	SV Lippstadt 08	26	(4)
2004–2005	Delbrücker SC		
Total		259	(60)

Managerial career
- 2004–2007: Delbrücker SC
- 2007–2010: SC Preußen Münster
- 2011–2012: SC Paderborn 07
- 2012–2014: Red Bull Salzburg
- 2014–2017: Bayer Leverkusen
- 2017–2019: Beijing Guoan
- 2020–2022: PSV
- 2022–2024: Benfica
- * Club domestic league appearances and goals

Roger Schmidt (German pronunciation: [ˈʁoːɡɐ ˈʃmɪt]; born 13 March 1967) is a German professional football manager and former player. He currently works as the Head of Global Soccer at Red Bull, taking over from Jürgen Klopp on 1 October 2026.

He played as a midfielder in Germany's amateur regional leagues, where he began his managerial career before joining SC Paderborn 07 of the 2. Bundesliga in 2011 and Bayer Leverkusen in the Bundesliga in 2014. He won the league and cup double with Red Bull Salzburg in 2014, as well as cups with Beijing Sinobo Guoan in 2018 and PSV in 2022. With Benfica, he became the first German to win the Primeira Liga.

== Football career ==
=== Playing and early managerial career ===
Born in Kierspe, North Rhine-Westphalia, Schmidt played as a midfielder for clubs in the region's leagues. He combined his career with studying Mechanical Engineering at Paderborn University, and then working for Benteler International.

In 2004, Schmidt was made player-manager of Delbrücker SC in the fifth-tier Verbandsliga. Two years later, with the team now one division up into the Oberliga, he retired from playing but stayed on for one further year solely as manager.

Having to balance the commitments of his marriage and young children, as well as his engineering profession, Schmidt only wanted to manage for one season but stayed for three. He decided to leave football for good, but was drawn back by interest from fellow Oberliga team SC Preußen Münster, for whom he quit his engineering job. He was appointed manager in May 2007, effective 1 July, and was sacked on 21 March 2010. Schmidt's contract stated that the club would find him an engineering job in the city of Münster should he be dismissed, but by that stage he was ready to commit solely to football management.

=== SC Paderborn 07 ===
Schmidt became manager of 2. Bundesliga club SC Paderborn 07 on 1 July 2011. On his professional debut 16 days later, the team won 2–1 at Hansa Rostock. On 30 July, the team won 10–0 in the first round of the DFB-Pokal away to Rot Weiss Ahlen, though the second round was a 4–0 loss at SpVgg Greuther Fürth. His sole league season at the Benteler-Arena ended in 5th place.

=== Red Bull Salzburg ===
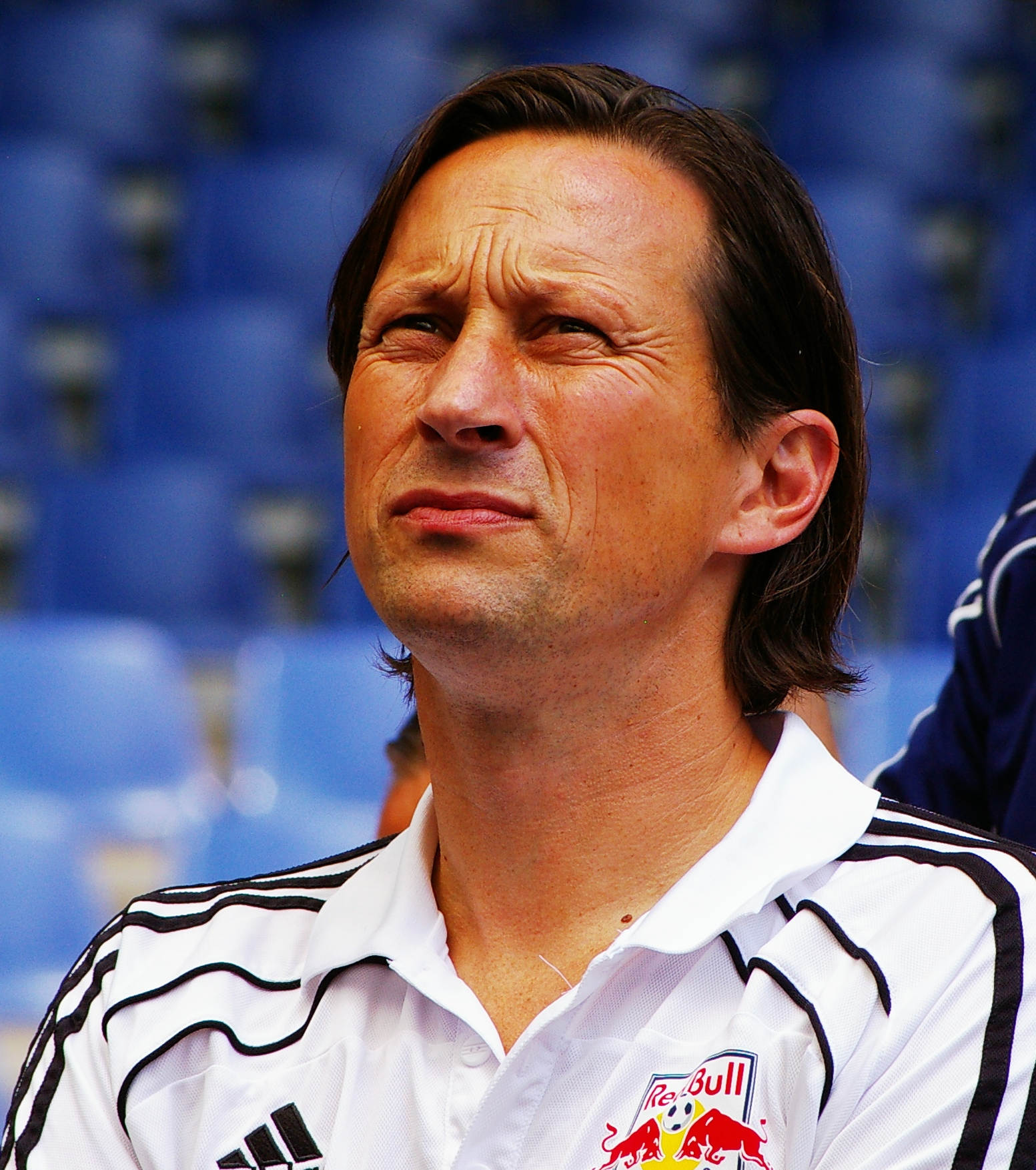
Schmidt in 2012

On 24 June 2012, Schmidt was announced as the new manager of Austrian Football Bundesliga reigning champions Red Bull Salzburg, after Ricardo Moniz. His assistant manager became Oliver Glasner. The team were eliminated from the UEFA Champions League second qualifying round by Luxembourg's F91 Dudelange in July, on the away goals rule after a 4–4 aggregate draw. Domestically, they came runners-up five points behind FK Austria Wien, and lost 2–1 in the Austrian Cup semi-finals to shock overall winners third-tier FC Pasching.

In 2013–14, Schmidt led Salzburg to the double, with an 18-point league advantage over SK Rapid Wien sealing the league title with eight games remaining. The team won 4–2 in the cup final over SKN St. Pölten.

=== Bayer Leverkusen ===
Bayer Leverkusen hired Schmidt on 25 April 2014, replacing the sacked Sami Hyypiä. His two-year contract was effective from the start of the 2014–15 season.

On Schmidt's debut, the team won 6–0 away to SV Alemannia Waldalgesheim in the first round of the cup with five goals from Stefan Kießling on 15 August; eight days later he won 2–0 at neighbours Borussia Dortmund on his Bundesliga bow. He finished his first season in fourth, lost the cup semi-final on penalties to Bayern Munich, and was eliminated from the last 16 of the Champions League on the same method against Atlético Madrid.

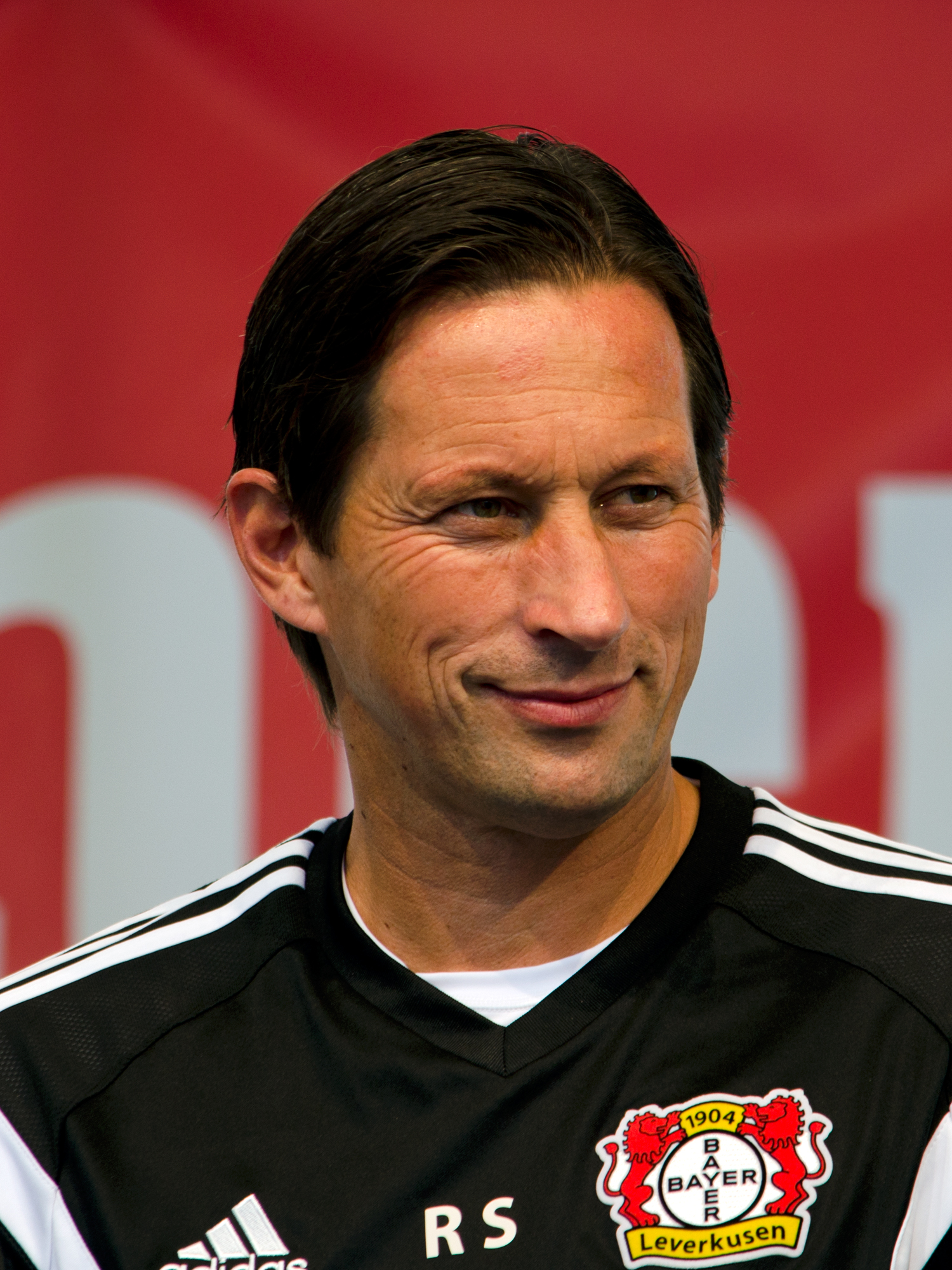
Schmidt with Bayer Leverkusen in 2015

After his first season, Schmidt signed a new contract until 2019. On 21 February 2016, he was sent off by referee Felix Zwayer in a game against Dortmund after disputing a free kick that led to the opponents scoring the only goal of the match. He initially refused to leave, causing Zwayer to suspend the game and lead the players off the field, culminating in an eight-minute delay before the match resumed without Schmidt on the field. The 2015–16 season ended in third with Champions League qualification.

On 5 March 2017, Schmidt was sacked by sporting director Rudi Völler following a 6–2 loss at Dortmund which left Leverkusen in 9th place.

=== Beijing Guoan ===
In June 2017, Schmidt joined Chinese Super League side Beijing Sinobo Guoan on a two-and-a-half-year contract. He won the Chinese FA Cup in 2018.

On 31 July 2019, he was sacked. Hundreds of fans came to the airport for an emotional farewell when he left.

=== PSV ===
Schmidt became the new head coach of PSV on 11 March 2020, on a contract until 2022. His team came second, 16 points behind Ajax in his first season, but beat Ajax in the 2021 Johan Cruyff Shield 4–0 on 7 August. PSV won the 2022 KNVB Cup Final, beating Ajax again, 2–1 on 17 April.

Schmidt left PSV at the end of his contract.

=== Benfica ===
On 18 May 2022, Schmidt signed a two-year deal with Primeira Liga club Benfica. He became the second German to be appointed as manager of the club, after Jupp Heynckes. Benfica began the 2022–23 season by winning their first 13 matches across Liga and Champions League (qualifying and group stages), marking the club's best start to a season in 39 years. On 21 October, Schmidt won his first O Clássico, ending Benfica's nine-match winless run against rivals Porto. Benfica's form made the team unbeatable for 29 matches, before a 3–0 away defeat to Braga on 30 December. In Europe, Benfica's Champions League campaign amassed several records: they surpassed the Portuguese record for consecutive matches without losing in the competition, they became the first Portuguese team to reach the quarter-finals twice in a row, and they achieved their biggest home and away wins (excluding qualifying stages), 5–1 against Club Brugge and 1–6 against Maccabi Haifa, respectively.

On 31 August 2024, Schmidt was sacked by Benfica following a 1–1 draw away to Moreirense, ending his 2-year stay as manager of the Portuguese club.

== Managerial statistics ==
As of match played 30 August 2024

Managerial record by team and tenure
Team	From	To	Record					Ref.
Team	From	To	P	W	D	L	Win %	Ref.
Delbrücker SC	1 July 2004	30 June 2007	130	69	25	36	53.08	
SC Preußen Münster	1 July 2007	21 March 2010	108	59	28	21	54.63	
SC Paderborn 07	1 July 2011	24 June 2012	36	18	10	8	50.00	
Red Bull Salzburg	24 June 2012	31 May 2014	99	68	18	13	68.69	
Bayer Leverkusen	1 June 2014	5 March 2017	130	67	27	36	51.54	
Beijing Guoan	3 July 2017	31 July 2019	83	46	15	22	55.42	
PSV	28 April 2020	30 June 2022	104	69	18	17	66.35	
Benfica	1 July 2022	31 August 2024	115	80	20	15	69.57	
Total			804	476	159	169	59.20	

== Managerial honours ==
Red Bull Salzburg

- Austrian Football Bundesliga: 2013–14
- Austrian Cup: 2013–14

Beijing Guoan

- Chinese FA Cup: 2018

PSV

- KNVB Cup: 2021–22
- Johan Cruyff Shield: 2021

Benfica

- Primeira Liga: 2022–23
- Supertaça Cândido de Oliveira: 2023

Individual

- Primeira Liga Manager of the Season: 2022–23
- Primeira Liga's Manager of the Month: August 2022, October/November 2022, December 2022/January 2023
