= Leandro Santos =

Leandro Santos may refer to:

- Leandro Santos (footballer, born 1984), Brazilian former football goalkeeper
- Leandro Santos (footballer, born 2005), Portuguese football right-back for Benfica B

== See also ==
- Leandro dos Santos (born 1986), Brazilian former football midfielder
