= 2024–25 S.L. Benfica season =

Benfica
2024–25 season
- President: Rui Costa
- Head coach: Roger Schmidt (until 31 August 2024); Bruno Lage (from 5 September 2024)
- Stadium: Estádio da Luz
- Primeira Liga: 2nd
- Taça de Portugal: Runners-up
- Taça da Liga: Winners
- UEFA Champions League: Round of 16
- FIFA Club World Cup: Round of 16
- Top goalscorer: League: Vangelis Pavlidis (19); All: Vangelis Pavlidis (30)
- Highest home attendance: 63,342 v Porto (10 November 2024)
- Lowest home attendance: 48,639 v Santa Clara (30 October 2024)
- Average home league attendance: 58,746 (17 matches)
- Biggest win: Benfica 7–0 Estrela da Amadora (23 November 2024)
- Biggest defeat: Benfica 1–4 Chelsea (28 June 2025)
Home colours	Away colours	Third colours

The 2024–25 Sport Lisboa e Benfica season was the club's 121st season in existence and its 91st consecutive season in the top flight of Portuguese football. Domestically, Benfica played in the Primeira Liga, and also competed in the Taça da Liga and Taça de Portugal. In Europe, Benfica played in the UEFA Champions League. At global level, the club competed in the newly expanded FIFA Club World Cup.

== Season summary ==
=== Pre-Season ===
Benfica entered the 2024–25 season aiming to regain the league title lost in the previous season, with Roger Schmidt remaining as manager for a third consecutive season. Several changes were made to the squad: left-backs Álvaro Carreras and Jan-Niklas Beste, right-back Issa Kaboré, midfielders Renato Sanches (on loan) and Leandro Barreiro, wingers Kerem Aktürkoğlu and Ángel Di María, and strikers Zeki Amdouni and Vangelis Pavlidis, all joined the club.

Departures included Morato, David Jurásek (on loan), João Mário, João Neves, Rafa Silva, David Neres, Casper Tengstedt and Marcos Leonardo.

Pre-season began on 3 July, with the first friendly taking place on 12 July, a 5–0 win over Farense. Further matches included two draws with Celta de Vigo and Brentford F.C., a 5–0 win over Feyenoord in the Eusébio Cup and 1–0 loss with Fullham.

=== August–October ===
The first official match of the season was on 11 August 2024 against Famalicão, which Benfica lost 2–0. The team responded with two consecutive home league victories before drawing 1–1 away with Moreirense, which meant Benfica was five points away from leaders Sporting. Poor results in the league led to Schmidt's dismissal, with Bruno Lage becoming the new manager.

In September Benfica won its three league games and defeated Red Star Belgrade in its Champions League debut. On 2 October Benfica hosted Atlético Madrid in the second matchday of the Champions League, winning 4–0. The result was followed by a 2–0 win over Pevidém S.C. in the third round of the Taça de Portugal and a 3–1 home loss to Feyenoord in the Champions League. With two more wins the team finished October in third place and qualified for the Taça da Liga semi-finals.

=== November–January ===
November started with a win over S.C. Farense, before travelling to Germany to face Bayern Munich, where the team lost 1–0, before hosting and defeating Porto 4–1 in the first O Clássico of the season. The team collected one more league win before defeating AS Monaco 3–2 away. The next month started with two league wins, before a goalless draw with Bologna and a 1–1 draw with AVS, but two wins over Estoril and Nacional allowed Benfica to climb to first place. In the last game of the year, Benfica visited Estádio José Alvalade losing 1–0 and dropping to second place.

The new year started with a 2–1 home loss to Braga, which cost the team the chance to reach the first place as Sporting had tied with Vitória de Guimarães. The team avenged its two latest losses defeating Braga 3–0 in the semi-finals and Sporting in a finals penalty shootout, winning the Taça da Liga. The result was followed by an away win over Farense in the Taça de Portugal and a league win over Famalicão, before hosting Barcelona in the Champions League matchday seven, where Benfica lost 4–5 with a controversial goal in extra time, followed by a 3–1 away loss with Casa Pia, now having a six-point disadvantage over Sporting. In January's last match Benfica travelled to Turin to face Juventus, needing a win to qualify for the play-offs; a goal from Vangelis Pavlidis and a goal from Orkun Kokcu allowed them to win 2–0, finishing the league phase in 16th place.

=== February–April ===
In February Benfica won its four league games, also defeating Braga 1–0 in the Taça de Portugal quarter-finals. In the Champions league play-off the team once again faced AS Monaco, winning 1–0 away and drawing 3–3 at home. March started with a Champions League round of 16 tie with Barcelona, with Benfica losing 1–0 the first leg at home despite playing most of the game against 10-man and losing 3–1 at Camp Nou, being eliminated from the competition. Despite being eliminated in European competitions the team won its three league matches, climbing to first place tied on points with Sporting.

April started with a home win over Farense, before facing Porto at Estádio do Dragão in O Clássico, where Benfica won 4–1 with Pavlidis scoring a hattrick, assuming the first place as Sporting had lost points with Braga. In the next matchday the team dropped points in a 2–2 draw with Arouca, being tied on points with Sporting once again. The team responded winning its next four matches, three of them for the league and also qualifying for the Taça de Portugal final.

=== May–June ===
On 10 May, Benfica hosted Sporting in a decisive Derby de Lisboa, with the game ending 1–1 meaning both teams would enter the last matchday with the same points, but with Sporting having the head-to-head advantage. In the last matchday Benfica tied 1–1 away with Braga, finishing the league in second place two points away from top. Eight days later, Benfica faced Sporting in the Taça de Portugal final. An early goal from Orkun Kokcu gave Benfica the advantage, but a last minute penalty tied the game for Sporting, taking it to extra-time, where the Lions won 3–1; minutes before the penalty a controversial incident happened, with Matheus Reis stepping on the head of Andrea Belotti and with VAR not interfering.

Benfica finished the season competing in the reformulated FIFA Club World Cup. The team finished the group stage in first place, drawing 2–2 with Boca Juniors, defeating Auckland City 6–0 and, for the first time in club history, defeating FC Bayern Munich. In the round of 16 an extra-time 4–1 defeat to, eventual winners, Chelsea eliminated them from the competition.

== Players ==
=== First-team squad ===
Note: Flags indicate national team as defined under FIFA eligibility rules; some limited exceptions apply. Players may hold more than one non-FIFA nationality.

No.	Pos.	Nation	Player
1	GK	UKR	Anatoliy Trubin
3	DF	ESP	Álvaro Carreras
4	DF	POR	António Silva (vice-captain)
6	DF	DEN	Alexander Bah
7	FW	SUI	Zeki Amdouni (on loan from Burnley)
8	MF	NOR	Fredrik Aursnes
9	FW	BRA	Arthur Cabral
10	MF	TUR	Orkun Kökçü
11	FW	ARG	Ángel Di María
14	FW	GRE	Vangelis Pavlidis
16	MF	POR	Manu Silva
17	FW	TUR	Kerem Aktürkoğlu
18	MF	LUX	Leandro Barreiro
19	FW	ITA	Andrea Belotti (on loan from Como)
21	FW	NOR	Andreas Schjelderup

No.	Pos.	Nation	Player
24	GK	POR	Samuel Soares
25	FW	ARG	Gianluca Prestianni
26	DF	SWE	Samuel Dahl (on loan from Roma)
27	FW	POR	Bruma
30	DF	ARG	Nicolás Otamendi (captain)
44	DF	POR	Tomás Araújo
47	FW	POR	Tiago Gouveia
60	MF	POR	Nuno Félix
61	MF	POR	Florentino Luís
71	DF	POR	Leandro Santos
75	GK	POR	André Gomes
81	DF	ALB	Adrian Bajrami
84	MF	POR	João Rego
85	MF	POR	Renato Sanches (on loan from PSG)
86	MF	POR	Diogo Prioste

== Transfers ==
=== In ===
No.	Pos	Player	Transferred from	Fee	Date	Source
Summer transfers
3	DF	(Spain) Álvaro Carreras	(England) Manchester United	€6,000,000	1 July 2024	
32	FW	(Argentina) Benjamín Rollheiser	(Argentina) River Plate	€9,500,000	1 July 2024	
14	FW	(Greece) Vangelis Pavlidis	(Netherlands) AZ Alkmaar	€18,000,000	1 July 2024	
18	MF	(Luxembourg) Leandro Barreiro	(Germany) Mainz 05	Free	2 July 2024	
37	MF	(Germany) Jan-Niklas Beste	(Germany) 1. FC Heidenheim	€8,000,000	11 July 2024	
85	MF	(Portugal) Renato Sanches	(France) Paris Saint-Germain	Loan	5 August 2024	
7	FW	(Switzerland) Zeki Amdouni	(England) Burnley	Loan	29 August 2024	
28	DF	(Burkina Faso) Issa Kaboré	(England) Manchester City	Loan	1 September 2024	
17	FW	(Turkey) Kerem Aktürkoğlu	(Turkey) Galatasaray	€12,000,000	2 September 2024	
Winter transfers
16	MF	(Portugal) Manu Silva	(Portugal) Vitória SC	€12,000,000	20 January 2025	
19	FW	(Italy) Andrea Belotti	(Italy) Como	Loan	3 February 2025	
27	FW	(Portugal) Bruma	(Portugal) Braga	€6,500,000	3 February 2025	
26	DF	(Sweden) Samuel Dahl	(Italy) Roma	Loan	3 February 2025	
Disclosed total
€72,000,000

=== Out ===
No.	Pos	Player	Transferred to	Fee	Date	Source
Summer transfers
27	FW	(Portugal) Rafa Silva	(Turkey) Beşiktaş	Free	1 July 2024	
—	DF	(Czech Republic) David Jurásek	(Germany) TSG Hoffenheim	Loan	1 July 2024	
—	FW	(Portugal) Henrique Araújo	(Portugal) Arouca	Loan	11 July 2024	
—	GK	(Japan) Leo Kokubo	(Belgium) Sint-Truiden	Free	11 July 2024	
—	MF	(Portugal) Paulo Bernardo	(Scotland) Celtic	€4,000,000	1 August 2024	
87	MF	(Portugal) João Neves	(France) Paris Saint-Germain	€60,000,000	5 August 2024	
19	FW	(Denmark) Casper Tengstedt	(Italy) Hellas Verona	Loan	9 August 2024	
7	FW	(Brazil) David Neres	(Italy) Napoli	€28,000,000	21 August 2024	
—	MF	(Portugal) Tiago Dantas	(Croatia) Osijek	Free	29 August 2024	
5	DF	(Brazil) Morato	(England) Nottingham Forest	€11,000,000	30 August 2024	
16	MF	(Portugal) Martim Neto	(Portugal) Rio Ave	Loan	2 September 2024	
36	FW	(Brazil) Marcos Leonardo	(Saudi Arabia) Al Hilal	€40,000,000	2 September 2024	
20	MF	(Portugal) João Mário	(Turkey) Beşiktaş	Loan	4 September 2024	
Winter transfers
23	MF	(France) Soualiho Meïté	(Greece) PAOK	Loan	22 January 2025	
37	DF	(Germany) Jan-Niklas Beste	(Germany) Freiburg	€8,000,000	31 January 2025	
32	FW	(Argentina) Benjamín Rollheiser	(Brazil) Santos	€11,000,000	12 February 2025	
Disclosed total
€162,000,000

== Pre-season friendlies ==
Win Draw Loss

The pre-season began on 3 July 2024.

12 July 2024 Friendly	Benfica	5–0	Farense	Águeda, Portugal
20:00 WEST (UTC+1)	Florentino 33'; Pavlidis 45+4'; Prestianni 48'; Rollheiser 54', 85'	Report		Stadium: Estádio Municipal de Águeda

13 July 2024 Friendly	Benfica	2–2	Celta de Vigo	Águeda, Portugal
19:00 WEST (UTC+1)	Pavlidis 13' (pen.), 28'		Aspas 70'; Durán 74'	Stadium: Estádio Municipal de Águeda

25 July 2024 Friendly	Benfica	1–1	Brentford	Lisbon, Portugal
20:00 WEST (UTC+1)	Pavlidis 24'		Peart-Harris (yellow card) 7'; Mbuemo 9'	Stadium: Estádio da Luz

28 July 2024 Eusébio Cup	Benfica	5–0	Feyenoord	Lisbon, Portugal
20:00 WEST (UTC+1)	Prestianni 9'; Pavlidis 13', 15'; Beste 18'; Cabral 89'			Stadium: Estádio da Luz

2 August 2024 Algarve Cup	Benfica	0–1	Fulham	Faro/Loulé, Portugal
20:00 WEST				Stadium: Estádio Algarve

== Competitions ==
=== Overall record ===
Competition	First match	Last match	Starting round	Final position	Record							
Competition	First match	Last match	Starting round	Final position	Pld	W	D	L	GF	GA	GD	Win %
Primeira Liga	11 August 2024	17 May 2025	Matchday 1	2nd	34	25	5	4	84	28	+56	73.53
Taça de Portugal	19 October 2024	25 May 2025	Third round	Runners-up	7	6	0	1	23	4	+19	85.71
Taça da Liga	30 October 2024	11 January 2025	Quarter-finals	Winners	3	2	1	0	7	1	+6	66.67
UEFA Champions League	19 September 2024	11 March 2025	League phase	Round of 16	12	5	2	5	21	19	+2	41.67
FIFA Club World Cup	16 June 2025	28 June 2025	Group stage	Round of 16	4	2	1	1	10	6	+4	50.00
Total					60	40	9	11	145	58	+87	66.67

Source: Soccerway

=== Primeira Liga ===
==== League table ====
Pos	Team	Pld	W	D	L	GF	GA	GD	Pts	Qualification or relegation
1	Sporting CP (C)	34	25	7	2	88	27	+61	82	Qualification for the Champions League league phase
2	Benfica	34	25	5	4	84	28	+56	80	Qualification for the Champions League third qualifying round
3	Porto	34	22	5	7	65	30	+35	71	Qualification for the Europa League league phase (Note: The 2024–25 Taça de Portugal winners (Sporting) finished in the top two, thus the third place team got the league stage berth.)
4	Braga	34	19	9	6	55	30	+25	66	Qualification for the Europa League second qualifying round
5	Santa Clara	34	17	6	11	36	32	+4	57	Qualification for the Conference League second qualifying round

Source: Liga Portugal
Rules for classification: 1) Points; 2) Head-to-head points; 3) Head-to-head goal difference; 4) Goal difference; 5) Matches won; 6) Goals scored; 7) Play-off.
(C) Champions

==== Results summary ====
Overall								Home						Away					
Pld	W	D	L	GF	GA	GD	Pts	W	D	L	GF	GA	GD	W	D	L	GF	GA	GD
34	25	5	4	84	28	+56	80	14	2	1	52	12	+40	11	3	3	32	16	+16

Source: Liga Portugal

==== Results by round ====
Round	1	2	3	4	5	6	7	9	10	11	12	13	14	8^{1}	15	16	17	18	19	20	21	22	23	25	26	24	27	28	29	30	31	32	33	34
Ground	A	H	H	A	H	A	H	A	H	A	H	A	H	A	H	A	H	H	A	A	H	A	H	A	H	A	H	A	H	A	H	A	H	A
Result	L	W	W	D	W	W	W	W	W	W	W	W	D	W	W	L	L	W	L	W	W	W	W	W	W	W	W	W	D	W	W	W	D	D
Position	16	8	6	7	5	3	3	3	3	3	3	2	3	2	1	3	3	2	2	2	2	2	2	2	2	2	2	1	2	2	2	2	2	2
Points	0	3	6	7	10	13	16	19	22	25	28	31	32	35	38	38	38	41	41	44	47	50	53	56	59	62	65	68	69	72	75	78	79	80

Source: Liga Portugal
A = Away; H = Home; W = Win; D = Draw; L = Loss
Notes:
- Positions show the situation at the end of the corresponding Game Weeks (GW), not the position at the conclusion of matches or game days.

^{1} Matchday 8 (vs Nacional) was postponed to 19 December 2024.

==== Matches ====
11 August 2024 1	Famalicão	2–0	Benfica	Vila Nova de Famalicão
18:00 WEST (UTC+1)	Sorriso 12'; Luiz Júnior (yellow card) 66'; Youssouf (yellow card) 73' (goal) 90'; Lobato (yellow card) 90+2'	Report	João Mário (yellow card) 16'; Prestianni (yellow card) 45+3'; Kökçü (yellow card) 57'; Carreras (yellow card) 80'	Stadium: Estádio Municipal 22 de Junho; Attendance: 5,025; Referee: Fábio Veríssimo (Leiria)

17 August 2024 2	Benfica	3–0	Casa Pia	Lisbon
20:30 WEST (UTC+1)	Pavlidis 70'; Gouveia 80'; Aursnes 90'	Report	Segovia (yellow card) 67'	Stadium: Estádio da Luz; Attendance: 58,926; Referee: Iancu Vasilica (Vila Real)

24 August 2024 3	Benfica	1–0	Estrela da Amadora	Lisbon
20:30 WEST (UTC+1)	Kökçü 19' (yellow card) 34'; Carreras (yellow card) 36'; Gouveia (yellow card) 59'; Sanches (yellow card) 90+6'	Report	André Luiz (yellow card) 36'; Santana (yellow card) 72'; Cordeiro (yellow card) 87'	Stadium: Estádio da Luz; Attendance: 59,490; Referee: Hélder Malheiro (Lisbon)

30 August 2024 4	Moreirense	1–1	Benfica	Moreira de Cónegos
20:15 WEST (UTC+1)	Alan (yellow card) 45+5'; Frimpong (yellow card) 66'; Ofori 84'; Maracás (yellow card) 90+6'	Report	Otamendi (yellow card) 31'; Florentino (yellow card) 43'; Carreras (yellow card) 61'; Barreiro (yellow card) 77'; Rollheiser (yellow card) 90+6'; Marcos Leonardo 90+7' (pen.)	Stadium: Parque de Jogos Comendador Joaquim de Almeida Freitas; Attendance: 5,817; Referee: André Narciso (Setúbal)

14 September 2024 5	Benfica	4–1	Santa Clara	Lisbon
20:30 WEST (UTC+1)	Aktürkoğlu 27'; Florentino 34'; A. Silva 47' (yellow card) 74'; Di María 58'	Report	Lopes 1'; Safira (yellow card) 30'; Luís Rocha (yellow card) 72'; Serginho (yellow card) 90'	Stadium: Estádio da Luz; Attendance: 60,145; Referee: Cláudio Pereira (Aveiro)

23 September 2024 6	Boavista	0–3	Benfica	Porto
20:15 WEST (UTC+1)	Camará (yellow card) 70'; Gomes (yellow card) 78'	Report	Pavlidis 11'; Kökçü 31'; Cabral 90+1'	Stadium: Estádio do Bessa; Attendance: 16,151; Referee: João Pinheiro (Braga)

28 September 2024 7	Benfica	5–1	Gil Vicente	Lisbon
20:30 WEST (UTC+1)	Otamendi 17'; Aktürkoğlu 25'; Kökçü (yellow card) 33'; Amdouni 78'; Florentino 90'; Rollheiser 90+4'	Report	Correia 8'; García (yellow card) 9'; Cruz (yellow card) 34'	Stadium: Estádio da Luz; Attendance: 58,965; Referee: Miguel Nogueira (Lisbon)

27 October 2024 9	Benfica	5–0	Rio Ave	Lisbon
18:00 WET (UTC±0)	Aktürkoğlu 12', 16', 45+2'; Di María (yellow card) 30'; Schjelderup 79'; Amdouni 81'	Report	Panzo (yellow card) 4'	Stadium: Estádio da Luz; Attendance: 58,961; Referee: Tiago Martins (Lisbon)

2 November 2024 10	Farense	1–2	Benfica	Faro
18:00 WET (UTC±0)	Poveda 15'; Neto (yellow card) 84'	Report	Carreras 21'; Pavlidis 54'	Stadium: Estádio de São Luís; Attendance: 12,649; Referee: Cláudio Pereira (Aveiro)

10 November 2024 11	Benfica	4–1	Porto	Lisbon
20:45 WET (UTC±0)	Carreras (yellow card) 19' (goal) 30'; Di María 56', 82' (pen.); Pérez 61' (o.g.); Kökçü (yellow card) 84'	Report	Varela (yellow card) 19'; Omorodion 44'; Vieira (yellow card) 51'; Fernandes (yellow card) 52'; João Mário (yellow card) 79'; González (yellow card) 90+1'; Borges (yellow card) 90+3'	Stadium: Estádio da Luz; Attendance: 63,342; Referee: João Pinheiro (Braga)

1 December 2024 12	Arouca	0–2	Benfica	Arouca
18:00 WET (UTC±0)	Loum (yellow card) 37'; Lamba (yellow card) 40'	Report	Fontán 12' (o.g.); Kökçü (yellow card) 31'; Beste (yellow card) 69'; Di María 71' (pen.); Amdouni (yellow card) 90+1'	Stadium: Estádio Municipal de Arouca; Attendance: 4,644; Referee: Luís Godinho (Évora)

7 December 2024 13	Benfica	1–0	Vitória de Guimarães	Lisbon
18:00 WET (UTC±0)	Aktürkoğlu 29'; Vangelis Pavlidis (yellow card) 31'; Carreras (yellow card) 59'; Di María (yellow card) 90+3'	Report	Mendes (yellow card) 43'	Stadium: Estádio da Luz; Attendance: 58,839; Referee: Miguel Nogueira (Lisbon)

15 December 2024 14	AVS	1–1	Benfica	Vila das Aves
15:30 WET (UTC±0)	Devenish (yellow card) 45+1' (goal) 90+4'; Fonseca (yellow card) 74'	Report	Amdouni 17'; Cabral (yellow card) 39'; Beste (yellow card) 78'	Stadium: Estádio do CD Aves; Attendance: 5,473; Referee: João Gonçalves (Porto)

19 December 2024 8	Nacional	0–2	Benfica	Funchal
17:00 WET (UTC±0)	Gomes (yellow card) 45+2'; Soumaré (yellow card) 67'; Barreiro (yellow card) 84'	Report	Pavlidis (yellow card) 16'; Bah (yellow card) 45+3'; Di María 59' (pen.), 74' (yellow card) 62'	Stadium: Estádio da Madeira; Attendance: 5,086; Referee: Gustavo Correia (Porto)

23 December 2024 15	Benfica	3–0	Estoril	Lisbon
18:45 WET (UTC±0)	Pavlidis 28'; Kökçü (yellow card) 67'; Amdouni 73', 90+4'	Report	Boma (yellow card) 34'	Stadium: Estádio da Luz; Attendance: 60,572; Referee: António Nobre (Leiria)

29 December 2024 16	Sporting CP	1–0	Benfica	Lisbon
20:30 WET (UTC±0)	Catamo 29'; Reis (yellow card) 59'; Israel (yellow card) 63'	Report	Otamendi (yellow card) 34'; Bah (yellow card) 58'; Araújo (yellow card) 90+3'	Stadium: Estádio José Alvalade; Attendance: 48,076; Referee: Fábio Veríssimo (Leiria)

4 January 2025 17	Benfica	1–2	Braga	Lisbon
18:00 WET (UTC±0)	Di María (yellow card) 52'; Cabral 77' (yellow card) 79'; Barreiro (yellow card) 88'; Beste (yellow card) 89'	Report	Navarro 17'; Gorby (yellow card) 36'; Bambu 40'; Matheus (yellow card) 54'; Ferreira (yellow card) 90+3'	Stadium: Estádio da Luz; Attendance: 61,750; Referee: Luís Godinho (Évora)

17 January 2025 18	Benfica	4–0	Famalicão	Lisbon
20:15 WET (UTC±0)	Barreiro 11', 36', 67' (yellow card) 23'; Florentino (yellow card) 38'; A. Silva (yellow card) 42'; Kökçü 80'	Report		Stadium: Estádio da Luz; Attendance: 53,985; Referee: João Gonçalves (Porto)

25 January 2025 19	Casa Pia	3–1	Benfica	Rio Maior
18:00 WET (UTC±0)	Cassiano 32'; Moreira 60' (yellow card) 79'; Sousa (yellow card) 82'; Livolant 90+4'	Report	Di María 14' (pen.)	Stadium: Estádio Municipal de Rio Maior; Attendance: 7,051; Referee: António Nobre (Leiria)

2 February 2025 20	Estrela da Amadora	2–3	Benfica	Amadora
20:30 WET (UTC±0)	Pinho (yellow card) 16'; Travassos 28', (yellow card) 79'; Banza 49'; Bucca (yellow card) 76'	Report	Otamnedi 6'; Dramé 10' (o.g.); Pavlidis 34'; M. Silva (yellow card) 37'; Cabral (penalty missed) 87'; Aursnes (yellow card) 90+6'	Stadium: Estádio José Gomes; Attendance: 6,243; Referee: João Pinheiro (Braga)

8 February 2025 21	Benfica	3–2	Moreirense	Lisbon
18:00 WET (UTC±0)	Pavlidis 7' (pen.), 15'; Otamnedi 42'	Report	Benny 19'; Marcelo (yellow card) 45+2'; Rodrigues 85'	Stadium: Estádio da Luz; Attendance: 58,189; Referee: Bruno Costa (Viana do Castelo)

15 February 2025 22	Santa Clara	0–1	Benfica	Ponta Delgada
17:00 AZOT (UTC-1)	Lopes (yellow card) 58'; Rocha (yellow card) 59'; Lima (yellow card) 62' (yellow-red card) 76'; Calila (yellow card) 77'; Ferreira (yellow card) 87'	Report	Barreiro (yellow card) 49'; Bruma 55'; Félix (yellow card) 90+1'	Stadium: Estádio de São Miguel; Attendance: 9,933; Referee: Hélder Malheiro (Lisbon)

22 February 2025 23	Benfica	3–0	Boavista	Lisbon
18:00 WET (UTC±0)	Belotti 28'; Pavlidis 70'; Kökçü 77' (pen.)	Report	Pérez (yellow card) 26'; Reisinho (yellow card) 45' (red card) 51'; Agra (yellow card) 78'	Stadium: Estádio da Luz; Attendance: 58,022; Referee: José Bessa (Porto)

8 March 2025 25	Benfica	3–0	Nacional	Lisbon
18:00 WET (UTC±0)	Amdouni 5'; Kökçü 23' (pen.); Pavlidis 90+2' (pen.)	Report	Zé Vitor (yellow card) 19'; Soumaré (yellow card) 45+1'; Dudu (penalty missed) 45+7'; Aurélio (yellow card) 88'	Stadium: Estádio da Luz; Attendance: 52,543; Referee: André Narciso (Setúbal)

16 March 2025 26	Rio Ave	2–3	Benfica	Vila do Conde
18:00 WET (UTC±0)	Clayton (yellow card) 58' (yellow-red card) 90+4' (goal) 75'; Aguilera 64'; Tıknaz (yellow card) 68'	Report	Kökçü 30'; Pavlidis 53' (pen.); Florentino (yellow card) 62'; Aktürkoğlu 80'	Stadium: Estádio dos Arcos; Attendance: 4,753; Referee: João Gonçalves (Porto)

28 March 2025 24	Gil Vicente	0–3	Benfica	Barcelos
20:15 WET (UTC±0)	Zé Carlos (yellow card) 19'; Bamba (yellow card) 45+1'; García (yellow card) 46'; Buatu (yellow card) 50'	Report	Aursnes 22'; Belotti 51'; Aktürkoğlu (yellow card) 83'; Florentino (yellow card) 90+2'; Di María 90+7' (pen.)	Stadium: Estádio Cidade de Barcelos; Attendance: 11,010; Referee: Miguel Nogueira (Lisbon)

2 April 2025 27	Benfica	3–2	Farense	Lisbon
20:15 WEST (UTC+1)	Aktürkoğlu 7', 54'; Pavlidis 23'; Trubin (yellow card) 90+2'	Report	Ribeiro 43'; Lopes 63'; Soares (yellow card) 89'	Stadium: Estádio da Luz; Attendance: 51,790; Referee: Hélder Carvalho (Santarém)

6 April 2025 28	Porto	1–4	Benfica	Porto
20:30 WEST (UTC+1)	Nehuén (yellow card) 16'; Aghehowa 81'; Borges (yellow card) 82'; Fernandes (yellow card) 90+3'	Report	Pavlidis 1', 42', 69'; Carreras (yellow card) 23'; Otamendi 90+4'	Stadium: Estádio do Dragão; Attendance: 49,193; Referee: João Pinheiro (Braga)

13 April 2025 29	Benfica	2–2	Arouca	Lisbon
18:00 WEST (UTC+1)	Kökçü 60'; Carreras (yellow card) 72'; Pavlidis 79'	Report	Santos (yellow card) 43'; Yalçın 72' (pen.); Mantl (yellow card) 76'; Fontán (yellow card) 82'; Weverson 90+5'	Stadium: Estádio da Luz; Attendance: 61,581; Referee: António Nobre (Leiria)

19 April 2025 30	Vitória de Guimarães	0–3	Benfica	Guimarães
20:30 WEST (UTC+1)	Villanueva (yellow card) 52'; Samu (yellow card) 82'	Report	Pavlidis 21', 84'; Aktürkoğlu (yellow card) 45+1'; Carreras (yellow card) 71' (goal) 77'; Di María (yellow card) 90+1'; Florentino (yellow card) 90+4'	Stadium: Estádio D. Afonso Henriques; Attendance: 23,341; Referee: Gustavo Correia (Porto)

27 April 2025 31	Benfica	6–0	AVS	Lisbon
18:00 WEST (UTC+1)	Araújo 8'; Pavlidis 23'; Amdouni 26'; Aktürkoğlu 40'; Carreras (yellow card) 65'; Belotti 71'; Otamendi 82'	Report	Fonseca (yellow card) 33'; Mendonça (yellow card) 42'; Assunção (yellow card) 81'	Stadium: Estádio da Luz; Attendance: 58,102; Referee: Carlos Macedo (Braga)

3 May 2025 32	Estoril	1–2	Benfica	Estoril
20:30 WEST (UTC+1)	Orellana (yellow card) 63'; Begraoui (penalty missed) 66'; Zanocelo 78' (yellow card) 83'	Report	Aursnes 7'; Pavlidis (yellow card) 28'; Otamendi 35'; Florentino (yellow card) 74'	Stadium: Estádio António Coimbra da Mota; Attendance: 5,026; Referee: João Gonçalves (Porto)

10 May 2025 33	Benfica	1–1	Sporting CP	Lisbon
18:00 WEST (UTC+1)	Otamendi (yellow card) 15'; Florentino (yellow card) 60'; Aktürkoğlu 63' (yellow card) 70'; Kökçü (yellow card) 90+3'; A. Silva (yellow card) 90+8'	Report	Trincão 4'; Hjulmand (yellow card) 19'; R. Silva (yellow card) 54'; Esgaio (red card) 90+8'	Stadium: Estádio da Luz; Attendance: 63,478; Referee: João Pinheiro (Braga)

17 May 2025 34	Braga	1–1	Benfica	Braga
18:00 WEST (UTC+1)	Zalazar 24' (pen.); Chissumba (yellow card) 55'; Moutinho (yellow card) 55' (yellow-red card) 66'; Račić (yellow card) 57'	Report	Kökçü (yellow card) 33'; Otamendi (yellow card) 45+3'; Pavlidis 63'	Stadium: Estádio Municipal de Braga; Attendance: 20,198; Referee: Miguel Nogueira (Lisbon)

=== Taça de Portugal ===
19 October 2024 Third round	Pevidém	0–2	Benfica	Moreira de Cónegos
20:15 WEST (UTC+1)		Report	Beste 3', 75'; Carreras (yellow card) 51'	Stadium: Parque de Jogos Comendador Joaquim de Almeida Freitas; Referee: David Silva (Porto)

23 November 2024 Fourth round	Benfica	7–0	Estrela da Amadora	Lisbon
20:45 WET (UTC±0)	Di María 2', 5', 18'; Aktürkoğlu 59'; Rollheiser (yellow card) 74'; Amdouni 81'; Cabral 86', 90'	Report	Montoia (yellow card) 41'; Travassos (yellow card) 63'	Stadium: Estádio da Luz; Attendance: 56,094; Referee: André Narciso (Setúbal)

14 January 2025 Fifth round	Farense	1–3	Benfica	Faro
20:15 WET (UTC±0)	Tomané 7'; R. Silva (yellow card) 42'; Ribeiro (yellow card) 45+4'	Report	Schjelderup 56'; Cabral 58'; Bah 62'	Stadium: Estádio de São Luís; Attendance: 5,437; Referee: Hélder Malheiro (Lisbon)

26 February 2025 Quarter-finals	Benfica	1–0	Braga	Lisbon
20:45 WET (UTC±0)	Pavlidis 39'; Carreras (yellow card) 46'; Otamendi (yellow card) 90+4'	Report	Horta (yellow card) 68'; Navarro (yellow card) 78'; Bambu (yellow card) 90+1'	Stadium: Estádio da Luz; Attendance: 56,927; Referee: João Pinheiro (Braga)

9 April 2025 Semi-finals; First leg	Tirsense	0–5	Benfica	Barcelos
20:45 WEST (UTC+1)	Morais (yellow card) 80'; Rodrigues (yellow card) 90+1'	Report	João Pedro 16' (o.g.); Rego 26'; Prestianni 67'; Cabral 72' (yellow card) 90+1'; Schjelderup 84'	Stadium: Estádio Cidade de Barcelos; Attendance: 11,950; Referee: David Silva (Porto)

23 April 2025 Semi-finals; Second leg	Benfica	4–0 (9–0 agg.)	Tirsense	Lisbon
20:15 WEST (UTC+1)	A. Silva 45+3'; Bajrami 74'; Belotti 78'; Barreiro 90+1'	Report	Pereira (yellow card) 72'; Morais (yellow card) 86'	Stadium: Estádio da Luz; Attendance: 48,601; Referee: Bruno Costa (Viana do Castelo)

25 May 2025 Final	Benfica	1–3 (a.e.t.)	Sporting CP	Oeiras
17:15 WEST (UTC+1)	Dahl (yellow card) 19'; Kökçü 47' (yellow card) 65'; Carreras (yellow card) 53'; Soares (yellow card) 114'	Report	Harder (yellow card) 78' (goal) 99'; Araújo (yellow card) 86'; Hjulmand (yellow card) 90+2'; Gyökeres 90+11' (pen.); Quenda (yellow card) 101'; Trincão 120+1'	Stadium: Estádio Nacional; Attendance: 37,393; Referee: Luís Godinho (Évora)

=== Taça da Liga ===
30 October 2024 Quarter-finals	Benfica	3–0	Santa Clara	Lisbon
20:15 WET (UTC±00:00)	Di María 71'; Pavlidis 76', 80'	Report	Safira (yellow card) 29'; Soares (yellow card) 36'; Pereira (yellow card) 58'	Stadium: Estádio da Luz; Attendance: 48,639; Referee: Hélder Malheiro (Lisbon)

8 January 2025 Semi-finals	Benfica	3–0	Braga	Leiria
19:45 WET (UTC±00:00)	Di María 27', 37'; Carreras 28'	Report	Ferreira (yellow card) 62'; Noro (red card) 78'; Fernandes (yellow card) 83'	Stadium: Estádio Dr. Magalhães Pessoa; Attendance: 19,917; Referee: Cláudio Pereira (Aveiro)

11 January 2025 Final	Sporting CP	1–1 (6–7 p)	Benfica	Leiria
19:45 WET (UTC±00:00)	Gyökeres 42' (pen.); Araújo (yellow card) 45+1'	Report	Schjelderup 29'; Carreras (yellow card) 58'	Stadium: Estádio Dr. Magalhães Pessoa; Attendance: 20,736; Referee: João Pinheiro (Braga)
	Penalties
	Gyökeres (penalty scored); Hjulmand (penalty scored); Harder (penalty scored); Araújo (penalty scored); Debast (penalty scored); Quenda (penalty scored); Trincão (penalty missed)		(penalty scored) Di María; (penalty scored) Amdouni; (penalty scored) Otamendi; (penalty scored) Aktürkoğlu; (penalty scored) Sanches; (penalty scored) Barreiro; (penalty scored) Florentino

=== UEFA Champions League ===
==== League phase ====
The league phase draw was held on 29 August 2024.

===== League table =====
Pos	Team	Pld	W	D	L	GF	GA	GD	Pts	Qualification
14	(Royal Dutch Football Association) PSV Eindhoven	8	4	2	2	16	12	+4	14	Advance to knockout phase play-offs (seeded)
15	(French Football Federation) Paris Saint-Germain	8	4	1	3	14	9	+5	13	Advance to knockout phase play-offs (seeded)
16	(Portuguese Football Federation) Benfica	8	4	1	3	16	12	+4	13	Advance to knockout phase play-offs (seeded)
17	(French Football Federation) Monaco	8	4	1	3	13	13	0	13	Advance to knockout phase play-offs (unseeded)
18	(French Football Federation) Brest	8	4	1	3	10	11	−1	13	Advance to knockout phase play-offs (unseeded)

Source: UEFA
Rules for classification: League phase tiebreakers

===== Results by round =====
Round	1	2	3	4	5	6	7	8
Ground	A	H	H	A	A	H	H	A
Result	W	W	L	L	W	D	L	W
Position	11	3	13	19	14	15	21	16
Points	3	6	6	6	9	10	10	13

Source: UEFA
A = Away; H = Home; W = Win; D = Draw; L = Loss

===== Matches =====
19 September 2024 1	Red Star Belgrade (Serbia)	1–2	(Portugal) Benfica	Belgrade, Serbia
18:45 CEST (UTC+02:00)	Silas (yellow card) 25'; Milson 86'; Seol Young-woo (yellow card) 90+4'	Report	Aktürkoğlu 9'; Kökçü 29'; Carreras (yellow card) 52'; Kaboré (yellow card) 64'; Aursnes (yellow card) 77'	Stadium: Rajko Mitić Stadium; Attendance: 44,238; Referee: Michael Oliver (England)

2 October 2024 2	Benfica (Portugal)	4–0	(Spain) Atlético Madrid	Lisbon, Portugal
20:00 WEST (UTC+01:00)	Aktürkoğlu 13'; Aursnes (yellow card) 22'; Di María 52' (pen.); Bah 75'; Kökçü 84' (pen.)	Report	Serrano (yellow card) 70'; Mandava (yellow card) 83'; Giménez (yellow card) 83'; Correa (yellow card) 90+5'	Stadium: Estádio da Luz; Attendance: 62,028; Referee: Serdar Gözübüyük (Netherlands)

23 October 2024 3	Benfica (Portugal)	1–3	(Netherlands) Feyenoord	Lisbon, Portugal
20:00 WEST (UTC+01:00)	Aktürkoğlu 66'; Amdouni (yellow card) 90+1'; Sanches (yellow card) 90+2'	Report	Ueda 12'; Milambo 33', 90+2'; Timber (yellow card) 39'	Stadium: Estádio da Luz; Attendance: 61,687; Referee: Halil Umut Meler (Turkey)

6 November 2024 4	Bayern Munich (Germany)	1–0	(Portugal) Benfica	Munich, Germany
21:00 CET (UTC+01:00)	Musiala 67', (yellow card) 73'	Report	Kaboré (yellow card) 26'; Kökçü (yellow card) 71'	Stadium: Allianz Arena; Attendance: 75,000; Referee: Davide Massa (Italy)

27 November 2024 5	Monaco (France)	2–3	(Portugal) Benfica	Monaco, France
21:00 CET (UTC+01:00)	Ben Seghir 13'; Zakaria (yellow card) 40'; Kehrer (yellow card) 41'; Singo (yellow card) 41' (yellow-red card) 58'; Magassa 67'; Mawissa (yellow card) 79'	Report	Florentino (yellow card) 5'; Carreras (yellow card) 29'; Aktürkoğlu (yellow card) 42'; Pavlidis 48'; Cabral 84'; Amdouni 88'	Stadium: Stade Louis II; Attendance: 13,581; Referee: Rade Obrenovič (Slovenia)

11 December 2024 6	Benfica (Portugal)	0–0	(Italy) Bologna	Lisbon, Portugal
20:00 WET (UTC±00:00)	Pavlidis (yellow card) 24'; Florentino (yellow card) 48'; Bah (yellow card) 59'; Kökçü (yellow card) 63'; Otamendi (yellow card) 76'	Report	Fabbian (yellow card) 53'; Casale (yellow card) 62'; Ferguson (yellow card) 71'; Freuler (yellow card) 89'; Beukema (yellow card) 90+5'	Stadium: Estádio da Luz; Attendance: 60,650; Referee: Radu Petrescu (Romania)

21 January 2025 7	Benfica (Portugal)	4–5	(Spain) Barcelona	Lisbon, Portugal
20:00 WET (UTC±00:00)	Pavlidis 2', 22', 30' (pen.); Araújo 68' (o.g.); Carreras (yellow card) 76'; Cabral (red card) 90+8'	Report	Lewandowski 13' (pen.), 78' (pen.); Gavi (yellow card) 36'; Raphinha 64', 90+6'; Koundé (yellow card) 66'; García 86'; De Jong (yellow card) 90+4'; López (yellow card) 90+8'	Stadium: Estádio da Luz; Attendance: 63,225; Referee: Danny Makkelie (Netherlands)

29 January 2025 8	Juventus (Italy)	0–2	(Portugal) Benfica	Turin, Italy
21:00 CET (UTC+01:00)	Vlahović (yellow card) 55'	Report	Pavlidis 16'; Otamendi (yellow card) 63'; Bah (yellow card) 78'; Kökçü 80'	Stadium: Juventus Stadium; Attendance: 41,402; Referee: István Kovács (Romania)

==== Knockout phase play-offs ====
The knockout phase play-offs draw was held on 31 January 2025.

12 February 2025 First leg	Monaco (France)	0–1	(Portugal) Benfica	Monaco
21:00 CET (UTC+1)	Al-Musrati (yellow card) 41' (yellow-red card) 52'; Vanderson (yellow card) 79'; Zakaria (yellow card) 90+1'	Report	Carreras (yellow card) 16'; Pavlidis 48'; Florentino (yellow card) 56'	Stadium: Stade Louis II; Attendance: 12,159; Referee: Maurizio Mariani (Italy)

18 February 2025 Second leg	Benfica (Portugal)	3–3 (4–3 agg.)	(France) Monaco	Lisbon, Portugal
20:00 WET (UTC±00:00)	Aktürkoğlu 22'; Barreiro (yellow card) 67'; Amdouni (yellow card) 71'; Pavlidis 76' (pen.); Kökçü 84'	Report	Minamino 32'; Ben Seghir 51'; Akliouche (yellow card) 62'; Ilenikhena 81'	Stadium: Estádio da Luz; Attendance: 60,776; Referee: Glenn Nyberg (Sweden)

===== Round of 16 =====
The draw for the round of 16 was held on 21 February 2025.

5 March 2025 First leg	Benfica (Portugal)	0–1	(Spain) Barcelona	Lisbon, Portugal
20:00 WET (UTC±00:00)	Barreiro (yellow card) 45'; Silva (yellow card) 45+5'; Carreras (yellow card) 73'; Rego (yellow card) 90+1'	Report	Cubarsí (red card) 22'; Martínez (yellow card) 45+2'; Raphinha 61'	Stadium: Estádio da Luz; Attendance: 62,437; Referee: Felix Zwayer (Germany)

11 March 2025 Second leg	Barcelona (Spain)	3–1 (4–1 agg.)	(Portugal) Benfica	Barcelona, Spain
18:45 CET (UTC+1)	Raphinha 11', 42'; Yamal 27'	Report	Otamendi 13'; Silva (yellow card) 48'	Stadium: Estadi Olímpic Lluís Companys; Attendance: 47,111; Referee: François Letexier (France)

=== FIFA Club World Cup ===
==== Group stage ====
The draw for the group stage was held on 5 December 2024.

Pos	Team	Pld	W	D	L	GF	GA	GD	Pts	Qualification
1	(Portugal) Benfica	3	2	1	0	9	2	+7	7	Advance to knockout stage
2	(Germany) Bayern Munich	3	2	0	1	12	2	+10	6	Advance to knockout stage
3	(Argentina) Boca Juniors	3	0	2	1	4	5	−1	2	
4	(New Zealand) Auckland City	3	0	1	2	1	17	−16	1	

Source: FIFA
Rules for classification: Group stage tiebreakers

16 June 2025 1	Boca Juniors (Argentina)	2–2	(Portugal) Benfica	Miami Gardens, United States
18:00 EDT (UTC−4)	Merentiel 21'; Battaglia 27'; Herrera (red card) 45'; Palacios (yellow card) 66'; Costa (yellow card) 85'; Figal (red card) 88'	Report	Di María 45+3' (pen.); Carreras (yellow card) 67'; Belotti (red card) 70'; Pavlidis (yellow card) 83'; Otamendi 84'	Stadium: Hard Rock Stadium; Attendance: 55,574; Referee: César Arturo Ramos (Mexico)

20 June 2025 2	Benfica (Portugal)	6–0	(New Zealand) Auckland City	Orlando, United States
12:00 EDT (UTC−4)	Carreras (yellow card) 45+4'; Di María 45+8' (pen.), 90+8' (pen.); Kökçü (yellow card) 48'; Pavlidis 53'; Renato Sanches 63'; Barreiro 76', 78'; Bajrami (yellow card) 87'	Report		Stadium: Inter&Co Stadium; Attendance: 6,730; Referee: Salman Falahi (Qatar)

24 June 2025 3	Benfica (Portugal)	1–0	(Germany) Bayern Munich	Charlotte, United States
15:00 EDT (UTC−4)	Schjelderup 13'; Sanches (yellow card) 19'; Otamendi (yellow card) 46'; Gouveia (yellow card) 89'	Report		Stadium: Bank of America Stadium; Attendance: 33,287; Referee: François Letexier (France)

==== Knockout stage ====
28 June 2025 Round of 16	Benfica (Portugal)	1–4 (a.e.t.)	(England) Chelsea	Charlotte, United States
16:00 EDT (UTC−4)	Pavlidis (yellow card) 50'; Florentino (yellow card) 62'; Kökçü (yellow card) 82'; A. Silva (yellow card) 90+5'; Di María 90+5' (pen.); Prestianni (yellow card) 90+6' (yellow-red card) 91'; Gouveia (yellow card) 120+1'	Report	Caicedo (yellow card) 61'; James 64'; Dewsbury-Hall (yellow card) 90+2', (goal) 117'; Palmer (yellow card) 92'; Colwill (yellow card) 102'; Nkunku 108'; Neto 114'	Stadium: Bank of America Stadium; Attendance: 25,929; Referee: Slavko Vinčić (Slovenia)

== Statistics ==
=== Appearances and goals ===
No.	Pos	Nat	Player	Total		Primeira Liga		Taça de Portugal		Taça da Liga		Champions League		FIFA Club World Cup	
No.	Pos	Nat	Player	Apps	Goals	Apps	Goals	Apps	Goals	Apps	Goals	Apps	Goals	Apps	Goals
Goalkeepers
1	GK	(Ukraine) UKR	Anatoliy Trubin	51	0	32	0	0	0	3	0	12	0	4	0
24	GK	(Portugal) POR	Samuel Soares	9	0	2	0	7	0	0	0	0	0	0	0
75	GK	(Portugal) POR	André Gomes	1	0	0	0	0+1	0	0	0	0	0	0	0
Defenders
3	DF	(Spain) ESP	Álvaro Carreras	52	4	30+2	3	5	0	3	1	10	0	2	0
4	DF	(Portugal) POR	António Silva	46	2	22+1	1	7	1	3	0	8+1	0	4	0
6	DF	(Denmark) DEN	Alexander Bah	29	2	17+1	0	2	1	1+1	0	6+1	1	0	0
26	DF	(Sweden) SWE	Samuel Dahl	22	0	6+5	0	4	0	0	0	1+2	0	3+1	0
30	DF	(Argentina) ARG	Nicolás Otamendi	54	8	30+1	6	4	0	3	0	12	1	4	1
44	DF	(Portugal) POR	Tomás Araújo	44	1	28	1	3	0	2	0	11	0	0	0
66	DF	(United States) USA	Joshua Wynder	1	0	0	0	0+1	0	0	0	0	0	0	0
71	DF	(Portugal) POR	Leandro Santos	5	0	3+1	0	1	0	0	0	0	0	0	0
81	DF	(Albania) ALB	Adrian Bajrami	6	1	0+1	0	2+1	1	0	0	0	0	0+2	0
Midfielders
8	MF	(Norway) NOR	Fredrik Aursnes	53	3	28+1	3	4+1	0	3	0	11+1	0	4	0
10	MF	(Turkey) TUR	Orkun Kökçü	55	12	30+3	7	2+1	1	2+1	0	12	4	2+2	0
16	MF	(Portugal) POR	Manu Silva	3	0	2+1	0	0	0	0	0	0	0	0	0
18	MF	(Luxembourg) LUX	Leandro Barreiro	47	6	11+16	3	3+3	1	0+1	0	2+7	0	3+1	2
60	MF	(Portugal) POR	Nuno Félix	3	0	0+2	0	0+1	0	0	0	0	0	0	0
61	MF	(Portugal) POR	Florentino	45	2	24+2	2	6	0	2	0	9	0	2	0
68	MF	(Portugal) POR	João Veloso	2	0	0	0	0+1	0	0	0	0	0	0+1	0
79	MF	(Portugal) POR	Hugo Félix	1	0	0	0	0+1	0	0	0	0	0	0	0
84	MF	(Portugal) POR	João Rego	13	1	0+3	0	1+2	1	0+1	0	0+4	0	0+2	0
85	MF	(Portugal) POR	Renato Sanches	21	1	1+9	0	0+1	0	1+2	0	1+3	0	2+1	1
86	MF	(Portugal) POR	Diogo Prioste	1	0	0+1	0	0	0	0	0	0	0	0	0
Forwards
7	FW	(Switzerland) SUI	Zeki Amdouni	43	9	9+15	7	2+4	1	1+1	0	1+10	1	0	0
9	FW	(Brazil) BRA	Arthur Cabral	34	7	2+19	2	4+1	4	1+1	0	0+6	1	0	0
11	FW	(Argentina) ARG	Ángel Di María	44	19	20+5	8	2+1	3	2+1	3	6+3	1	4	4
14	FW	(Greece) GRE	Vangelis Pavlidis	57	30	27+7	19	2+2	1	2+1	2	11+1	7	4	1
17	FW	(Turkey) TUR	Kerem Aktürkoğlu	53	16	25+5	11	2+2	1	1+2	0	11+1	4	1+3	0
19	FW	(Italy) ITA	Andrea Belotti	24	4	4+10	3	2+2	1	0	0	0+4	0	0+2	0
21	FW	(Norway) NOR	Andreas Schjelderup	40	5	3+17	1	3+4	2	2+1	1	6+1	0	2+1	1
25	FW	(Argentina) ARG	Gianluca Prestianni	14	1	4+4	0	0+2	1	0	0	0	0	2+2	0
27	FW	(Portugal) POR	Bruma	14	1	5+5	1	3	0	0	0	0	0	1	0
47	FW	(Portugal) POR	Tiago Gouveia	9	1	0+4	1	1+1	0	0	0	0	0	0+3	0
77	FW	(Portugal) POR	Gerson Sousa	1	0	0	0	0+1	0	0	0	0	0	0	0
Players who made an appearance and/or had a squad number but left the team.
5	DF	(Brazil) BRA	Morato	1	0	1	0	0	0	0	0	0	0	0	0
7	MF	(Brazil) BRA	David Neres	0	0	0	0	0	0	0	0	0	0	0	0
16	MF	(Portugal) POR	Martim Neto	0	0	0	0	0	0	0	0	0	0	0	0
19	FW	(Denmark) DEN	Casper Tengstedt	0	0	0	0	0	0	0	0	0	0	0	0
20	MF	(Portugal) POR	João Mário	2	0	2	0	0	0	0	0	0	0	0	0
23	MF	(France) FRA	Soualiho Meïté	0	0	0	0	0	0	0	0	0	0	0	0
28	DF	(Burkina Faso) BFA	Issa Kaboré	7	0	0+3	0	1	0	0+1	0	1+1	0	0	0
32	FW	(Argentina) ARG	Benjamín Rollheiser	18	1	1+8	1	2+1	0	0	0	1+5	0	0	0
36	FW	(Brazil) BRA	Marcos Leonardo	3	1	0+3	1	0	0	0	0	0	0	0	0
37	DF	(Germany) GER	Jan-Niklas Beste	22	2	5+8	0	2	2	1+1	0	0+5	0	0	0
87	MF	(Portugal) POR	João Neves	0	0	0	0	0	0	0	0	0	0	0	0
