= Arthur Cabral =

Brazilian footballer (born 1998)

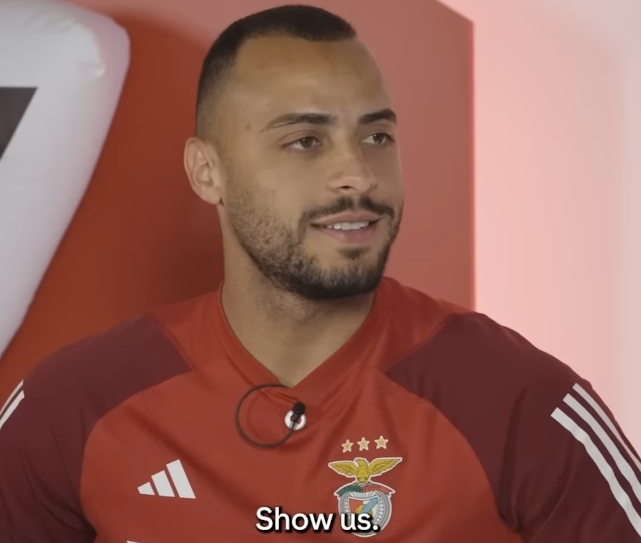
- Cabral with Benfica in 2023

Personal information
- Full name: Arthur Mendonça Cabral
- Date of birth: 25 April 1998 (age 28)
- Place of birth: Campina Grande, Brazil
- Height: 1.86 m (6 ft 1 in)
- Position: Forward

Team information
- Current team: Botafogo
- Number: 19

Youth career
- 2014–2016: Ceará
- 2015–2016: → Palmeiras (loan)

Senior career*
Years	Team	Apps	(Gls)
2015–2018	Ceará	61	(22)
2019–2020	Palmeiras	3	(1)
2019–2020	→ Basel (loan)	26	(14)
2020–2022	Basel	51	(32)
2022–2023	Fiorentina	42	(10)
2023–2025	Benfica	49	(8)
2025–	Botafogo	42	(11)

International career
2019	Brazil U23	2	(0)
- * Club domestic league appearances and goals as of 03:16, 24 July 2026 (UTC)

Arthur Mendonça Cabral (born 25 April 1998) is a Brazilian professional footballer who plays as a forward for Campeonato Brasileiro Série A club Botafogo.

== Club career ==
=== Ceará ===
Cabral was born in Campina Grande, Paraíba, Brazil, and joined Ceará's youth setup in 2014. He made his first team debut on 22 July 2015, coming on as a late substitute and scoring a last-minute winner in a 2–1 away victory against Tupi, for the year's Copa do Brasil.

In October 2015, Cabral was loaned to Palmeiras and returned to the youth setup. Back to Ceará in the following year, he spent some time in the under-20 squad before being definitely promoted to the first team in the 2017 season.

Cabral contributed with four goals in 16 matches during the 2017 Campeonato Brasileiro Série B, as his side achieved promotion to Série A. On 7 March 2018, he scored a brace in a 3–0 Campeonato Cearense away win against Ferroviário-CE.

=== Palmeiras ===
On 30 November 2018, Palmeiras officially signed Cabral for R$ 5,000,000 from Ceará. From there, he played three league matches, scoring one goal.

=== Basel ===
On 30 September 2019, Cabral was loaned to FC Basel in the Swiss Super League for their 2019–20 season under manager Marcel Koller. He made his team debut in the Swiss Cup match on 15 September in the away game against lower tier FC Meyrin being substituted in after 74 minutes as Basel won 3–0 to progress to the next round. He played his first game in the 2019–20 UEFA Europa League group stage on 19 September as Basel won 5–0 at home in the St. Jakob-Park against Russian team Krasnodar. He then made his domestic league debut on 22 September as Basel played a 1–1 draw with Young Boys in the Stadion Wankdorf. Cabral scored his first goal for his new club in the next league match one week later, on 25 September, as Basel won 4–0 at home against Zürich. During his next match just four days later, on 29 September, he scored two goals as Basel won 3–0 against Luzern.

On 29 June 2020, the club announced that Cabral, whose loan had come to the end, was signed permanently. He scored his first hat-trick for his club on 8 August 2021 against Servette, in fact he scored four goals as Basel won 5–1. He scored his first hat-trick at international level just two weeks later, on 19 August, in the 2021–22 UEFA Europa Conference League play-off match as Basel won 3–1 at home against Swedish club Hammarby IF.

FCB announced on 29 January 2022 that their top-scorer Cabral had transferred out to Fiorentina. In his two and a half years with the club Cabral had a total of 118 appearances for Basel scoring a total of 75 goals. 77 of these games were in the Super League, 3 in the Swiss Cup, 26 in the European competitions and 12 were test matches. He scored 46 goals in the domestic league, 2 in the cup, 17 in the European competitions and the other 10 were scored during the tests.

=== Fiorentina ===
On 29 January 2022, Cabral joined Italian Serie A side Fiorentina. He scored his first goal on 26 February 2022, in a 2–1 defeat against Sassuolo.

In the 2022–23 edition of the UEFA Conference League, Cabral finished as the top scorer of the competition, alongside Basel's Zeki Amdouni, with 7 goals. Fiorentina reached the tournament's final, where they lost 2–1 to West Ham United. He also finished that season as the top scorer of his club in all competitions with 17 goals.

=== Benfica ===
On 10 August 2023, it was announced that Cabral would move to Portugal and sign for Primeira Liga club Benfica on a five-year contract, for a reported fee of €20 million + €5 million in add-ons. The striker's release clause was set at €100 million.

Nine days later, Cabral made his debut for the Lisbon-based club, starting in a league match at home to Estrela da Amadora; with the game tied 0–0, Cabral was replaced in the 78th minute by Casper Tengstedt, who scored the opener just one minute later; Benfica went on to win by 2–0. Cabral made his UEFA Champions League debut on 3 October 2023, coming on as a substitute in the 79th minute of a 1–0 loss away at Inter Milan, in the competition's group stage. Cabral scored his first goal for Benfica on 20 October, in a 4–1 victory away at Campeonato de Portugal (Portuguese 4th division) side Lusitânia, in the 3rd round of the Taça de Portugal. Eleven days later, he came on as a second-half substitute and scored in a 2–0 victory away at Arouca, in the group stage of the Taça da Liga.

On 8 December, after a 1–1 league draw to Farense at the Estádio da Luz, Cabral was filmed showing his middle finger to Benfica fans while driving out of the stadium. He apologized the following day. Four days after the incident, in Benfica's last Champions League group stage match, away at Red Bull Salzburg, Cabral came off the bench during the injury time period and, one minute later, scored an essential back-heel goal to seal a 3–1 victory which qualified the Eagles to the UEFA Europa League knock-out round play-offs. On 29 December 2023, Cabral scored his first Primeira Liga goal, the opener in a 3–0 home victory over Famalicão. A month later, he scored a bicycle kick goal in a 4–1 league victory away at Estrela da Amadora.

=== Botafogo ===
On 8 June 2025, Cabral returned to Brazil after roughly five years, signing a deal with reigning Série A and Copa Libertadores champions Botafogo until the end of 2028. He scored his first goal for Botafogo on his debut, in the 2-0 victory over Vasco in the classic, in Brasília, in the 13th round of the Brazilian Championship.

== International career ==
=== Youth ===
Cabral has represented Brazil at the U-23 level, playing in two friendly matches against Colombia and Chile in September 2019.

=== Senior ===
In October 2021, Cabral received his first call-up to the Brazilian senior team for 2022 FIFA World Cup qualification matches as an injury replacement for Matheus Cunha.

== Career statistics ==
As of match played 23 July 2026

Appearances and goals by club, season and competition
Club	Season	League			State league (Note: Includes Campeonato Cearense, Campeonato Paulista, Campeonato Carioca)		National cup (Note: Includes Copa do Brasil, Swiss Cup, Coppa Italia, Taça de Portugal)		League cup (Note: Includes Taça da Liga)		Continental		Other		Total	
Club	Season	Division	Apps	Goals	Apps	Goals	Apps	Goals	Apps	Goals	Apps	Goals	Apps	Goals	Apps	Goals
Ceará	2015	Série B	1	0	0	0	2	1	—		—		—		3	1
Ceará	2016	Série B	0	0	0	0	0	0	—		—		—		0	0
Ceará	2017	Série B	16	4	1	0	1	0	—		—		1 (Note: Appearance in Primeira Liga)	0	19	4
Ceará	2018	Série A	31	7	12	11	4	1	—		—		8 (Note: Appearances in Copa do Nordeste)	5	55	24
Ceará	Total		48	11	13	11	7	2	—		—		9	5	77	29
Palmeiras	2019	Série A	1	0	2	1	1	0	—		1 (Note: Appearance in Copa Libertadores)	0	—		5	1
Basel (loan)	2019–20	Swiss Super League	26	14	—		2	2	—		11 (Note: Appearances in UEFA Europa League)	2	—		39	18
Basel	2020–21	Swiss Super League	33	18	—		0	0	—		3	2	—		36	20
Basel	2021–22	Swiss Super League	18	14	—		1	0	—		12 (Note: Appearances in UEFA Europa Conference League)	13	—		31	27
Basel	Total		77	46	—		3	2	—		26	17	—		106	65
Fiorentina	2021–22	Serie A	14	2	—		2	0	—		—		—		16	2
Fiorentina	2022–23	Serie A	28	8	—		4	1	—		16	8	—		48	17
Fiorentina	Total		42	10	—		6	1	—		16	8	—		64	19
Benfica	2023–24	Primeira Liga	28	6	—		4	3	3	1	8 (Note: Four appearances and one goal in UEFA Champions League, four appearances in UEFA Europa League)	1	—		43	11
Benfica	2024–25	Primeira Liga	21	2	—		5	4	2	0	6 (Note: Appearances in UEFA Champions League)	1	—		34	7
Benfica	Total		49	8	—		9	7	5	1	14	2	—		77	18
Botafogo	2025	Série A	21	4	—		3	1	—		2	0	2 (Note: Appearances in FIFA Club World Cup)	0	28	5
Botafogo	2026	Série A	16	7	5	0	2	0	—		8 (Note: Three appearances in Copa Libertadores, five appearances and two goals in Copa Sudamericana)	2	—		31	9
Botafogo	Total		37	11	5	0	5	1	—		10	2	2	0	59	14
Career total			254	86	20	12	31	13	5	1	67	29	11	5	388	146

== Honours ==
Ceará

- Campeonato Cearense: 2017, 2018

Fiorentina

- Coppa Italia runner-up: 2022–23
- UEFA Europa Conference League runner-up: 2022–23

Benfica

- Taça da Liga: 2024–25
- Taça de Portugal runner-up: 2024–25

Individual

- Swiss Super League Player of the Year: 2020–21
- Swiss Super League Team of the Year: 2020–21, 2021–22
- UEFA Europa Conference League top scorer: 2022–23 (joint)
