= Adrian Bajrami =

Swiss footballer (born 2002)

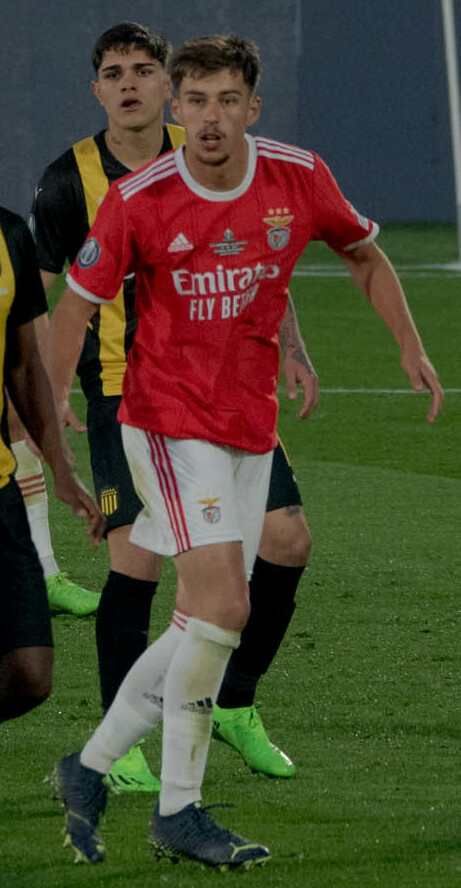
- Bajrami playing for Benfica at the Under-20 Intercontinental Cup

Personal information
- Date of birth: 5 April 2002 (age 24)
- Place of birth: Langenthal, Switzerland
- Height: 1.88 m (6 ft 2 in)
- Position: Centre-back

Team information
- Current team: Braga
- Number: 44

Youth career
- –2012: Langenthal
- 2012–2017: TOBE
- 2017–2018: Young Boys
- 2018–2022: Benfica

Senior career*
Years	Team	Apps	(Gls)
2022–2025	Benfica B	56	(4)
2025–2026	Benfica	1	(0)
2025–2026	→ Luzern (loan)	17	(1)
2026	Luzern	17	(1)
2026–	Braga	7	(0)

International career^{‡}
2019	Switzerland U18	2	(0)
2019	Albania U19	2	(0)
2022–2024	Albania U21	10	(0)
2022	Albania	3	(0)
2025–	Switzerland	3	(0)
- * Club domestic league appearances and goals as of 19 October 2026 ‡ National team caps and goals as of 16 November 2026

Adrian Bajrami (born 5 April 2002) is a Swiss professional footballer who plays as a centre-back for Primeira Liga club Braga and the Switzerland national team.

== Club career ==
Bajrami is a youth product of the academies of Langenthal, TOBE and Young Boys in Switzerland, before moving to Benfica's academy in 2018. On 29 October 2019, he signed his first professional contract with Benfica. He made his professional debut with Benfica B in a 2–1 Liga Portugal 2 loss to Académico Viseu, coming on as a late sub in the 75th minute.

On 14 July 2025, he joined Swiss club Luzern on loan. On 1 January 2026, he joined the club permanently.

== International career ==
Born in Switzerland, Bajrami is of Albanian origin from Ohrid, North Macedonia. In 2019, he played for both the Switzerland U18s and the Albania U19s. He was called up to the Albania national senior team for a set of friendlies in May 2022. He debuted with the Albania national senior team in a friendly 0–0 tie with Estonia on 13 June 2022.

On 1 September 2025, three days after being called up by Albania for the friendly match against Gibraltar and 2026 World Cup qualification match against Latvia, the Communications Department of the Albanian Football Federation confirmed that Bajrami had decided to represent the Switzerland national team. A month later, FIFA approved his request to switch international allegiance to Switzerland. The following day, he accepted their call-up for the 2026 FIFA World Cup qualification matches against Sweden and Slovenia.

== Career statistics ==
=== Club ===
As of match played 19 October 2026

Appearances and goals by club, season and competition
Club	Season	League			National cup (Note: Includes Taça de Portugal, Swiss Cup)		League cup (Note: Includes Taça da Liga)		Europe		Other		Total	
Club	Season	Division	Apps	Goals	Apps	Goals	Apps	Goals	Apps	Goals	Apps	Goals	Apps	Goals
Benfica B	2021–22	Liga Portugal 2	2	0	—		—		—		—		2	0
Benfica B	2022–23	Liga Portugal 2	23	2	—		—		—		—		23	2
Benfica B	2023–24	Liga Portugal 2	29	2	—		—		—		—		29	2
Benfica B	2024–25	Liga Portugal 2	2	0	—		—		—		—		2	0
Benfica B	Total		56	4	0	0	0	0	—		0	0	56	4
Benfica	2024–25	Primeira Liga	1	0	3	1	0	0	—		2 (Note: Appearances in FIFA Club World Cup)	0	6	1
Luzern (loan)	2025–26	Swiss Super League	17	1	1	0	—		—		—		18	1
Luzern	2025–26	Swiss Super League	17	1	1	0	—		—		—		18	1
Braga	2026–27	Primeira Liga	7	0	0	0	0	0	5 (Note: Appearances in UEFA Conference League)	0	—		12	0
Career total			99	6	5	1	0	0	5	0	2	0	111	7

=== International ===
As of match played 16 November 2026

Appearances and goals by national team and year
National team	Year	Apps	Goals
Albania	2022	3	0
Total		3	0
Switzerland	2025	1	0
Switzerland	2026	2	0
Total		3	0
Career total		6	0

== Honours ==
Benfica Youth

- Under-20 Intercontinental Cup: 2022

Benfica

- Taça da Liga: 2024–25
