= Álvaro Carreras =

Spanish footballer (born 2003)

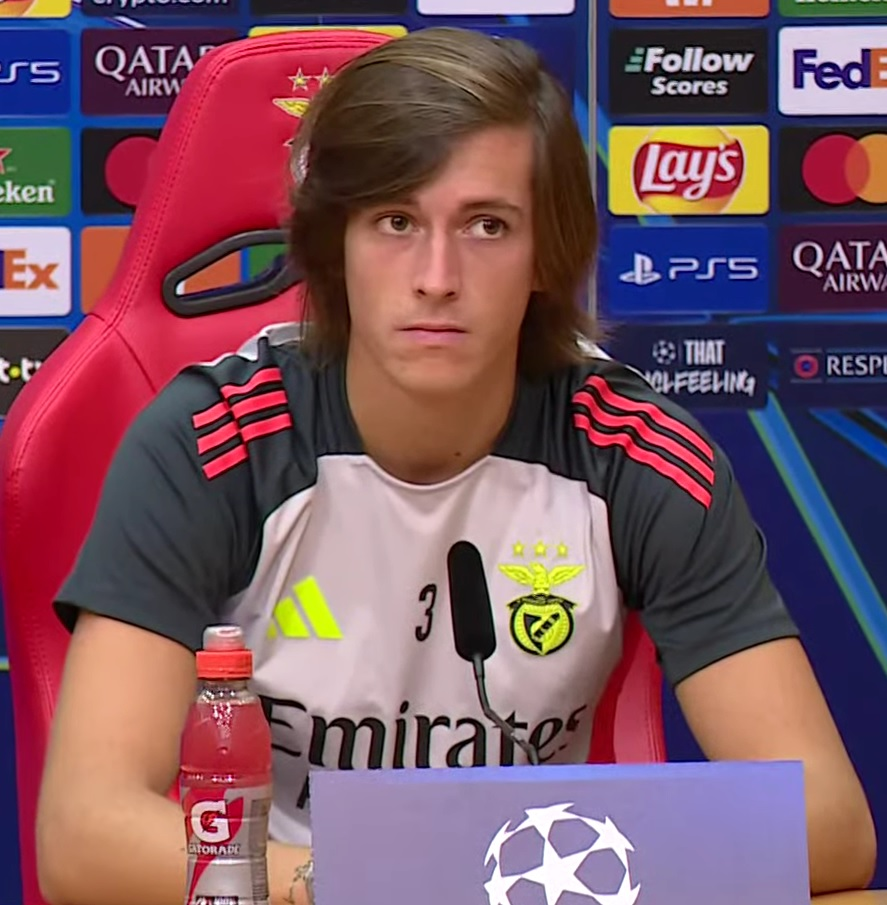
- Carreras with Benfica in 2024

Personal information
- Full name: Álvaro Fernández Carreras
- Date of birth: 23 March 2003 (age 23)
- Place of birth: Ferrol, Spain
- Height: 1.86 m (6 ft 1 in)
- Position: Left-back

Team information
- Current team: Real Madrid
- Number: 18

Youth career
- 2007–2012: Racing Ferrol
- 2012–2017: Deportivo La Coruña
- 2017–2020: Real Madrid
- 2020–2022: Manchester United

Senior career*
Years	Team	Apps	(Gls)
2022–2024	Manchester United	0	(0)
2022–2023	→ Preston North End (loan)	39	(0)
2023–2024	→ Granada (loan)	13	(0)
2024	→ Benfica (loan)	11	(1)
2024–2025	Benfica	32	(3)
2025–	Real Madrid	34	(3)

International career^{‡}
2021	Spain U19	2	(0)
2023–2024	Spain U21	9	(0)
2024	Galicia	1	(0)
- * Club domestic league appearances and goals as of 22:05, 21 November 2026 (UTC) ‡ National team caps and goals as of 14:24, 26 May 2025 (UTC)

Álvaro Fernández Carreras (born 23 March 2003) is a Spanish professional footballer who plays as a left-back for La Liga club Real Madrid.

Carreras began his youth career with Real Madrid before joining Manchester United in 2020. He later had loan spells with Preston North End, Granada and Benfica, joining Benfica permanently in 2024. After establishing himself in Portugal, he returned to Real Madrid in 2025.

Carreras represented Spain at under-19 and under-21 level.

== Club career ==
=== Early career ===
Born in Ferrol, Carreras started his career with Galicia de Caranza, before joining his hometown club Racing de Ferrol in 2007. During his time with the club, he played as a forward, scoring 100 goals in a season in the youth ranks. He joined Deportivo de La Coruña's youth ranks in 2012, where he was converted to a left-back, before moving to Real Madrid U13 in 2017.

=== Manchester United ===
Carreras signed for Premier League club Manchester United from Real Madrid in September 2020 on a four-year contract, amid interest from other European clubs such as Barcelona and Manchester City. He began training with the first team during the early stages of the 2021–22 season.

Carreras was a regular for the under-23 team in his first season at Manchester United, making 20 league appearances and one in the EFL Trophy, as well as seven for the under-18s, and two in the FA Youth Cup. He then played 21 times in the league in 2021–22, all as a starter, as well as playing in all three EFL Trophy matches and six of the seven in the UEFA Youth League. He received his first call-up to the Manchester United first team in April 2022, when he was named on the bench for the Premier League match at home to Chelsea. He was also named on the bench against Brighton & Hove Albion.

On 11 May 2022, Carreras was named Manchester United's U23 Player of the Year. He departed the club in 2024 before making his debut for the senior team.

==== Loan to Preston North End ====
On 26 July 2022, Carreras joined EFL Championship club Preston North End on loan for the duration of the 2022–23 season. He made his debut on 30 July 2022, coming on as a 72nd-minute substitute for Robbie Brady in a 0–0 draw away at Wigan Athletic.

==== Loan to Granada ====
On 1 September 2023, Carreras joined La Liga club Granada on a season-long loan. On 14 January 2024, he was recalled by Manchester United.

=== Benfica ===
On 17 January 2024, Manchester United sent Carreras on loan to Primeira Liga club Benfica until the end of the 2023–24 season. The loan deal included an optional buy-clause, reported to be €6 million, which became mandatory if he started 50% of Benfica's remaining games during the loan spell.

Seven days later, Carreras made his debut for Benfica, coming on as a second-half substitute in the Taça da Liga semi-final against Estoril; the game ended 1–1, with Benfica being subsequently eliminated by penalty shootout. On 4 February, he made his Primeira Liga debut, coming off the bench to replace Morato during the second half of a 3–0 victory over Gil Vicente at the Estádio da Luz.

On 26 May 2024, Manchester United announced that Benfica had exercised the €6 million buy option in Carreras' loan contract, which included €3 million in potential add-ons. Subsequently, he signed a new contract with Benfica until 2029.

=== Real Madrid ===
On 14 July 2025, Carreras returned to Real Madrid, signing for his boyhood club on a six-year deal reportedly worth €50 million. He made his debut for Madrid on 19 August 2025, in a 1–0 victory over Osasuna. Later that year, on 1 November, he scored his first goal in a 4–0 win over Valencia.

== International career ==
Carreras has played youth international football for Spain at under-19 and under-21 levels. He made his debut for the under-19 team on 26 October 2021, when he started in a friendly match against Israel.

== Personal life ==
Originally known as Álvaro Fernández, he later adopted his maternal surname, Carreras, in his career. However, Manchester United listed him under his paternal surname, Fernández, for the group stage of the 2021–22 UEFA Youth League. According to Álvaro, this decision made "both his mother and father happy".

== Career statistics ==
As of match played 21 November 2026

Appearances and goals by club, season and competition
Club	Season	League			National cup (Note: Includes FA Cup, Copa del Rey, Taça de Portugal)		League cup (Note: Includes EFL Cup, Taça da Liga)		Europe		Other		Total	
Club	Season	Division	Apps	Goals	Apps	Goals	Apps	Goals	Apps	Goals	Apps	Goals	Apps	Goals
Manchester United U21	2020–21	—			—		—		—		1 (Note: Appearance(s) in EFL Trophy)	0	1	0
Manchester United U21	2021–22	—			—		—		—		3	0	3	0
Manchester United U21	Total		—		—		—		—		4	0	4	0
Preston North End (loan)	2022–23	Championship	39	0	2	0	1	0	—		—		42	0
Granada (loan)	2023–24	La Liga	13	0	1	0	—		—		—		14	0
Benfica (loan)	2023–24	Primeira Liga	11	1	1	0	1	0	3 (Note: Appearances in UEFA Europa League)	0	—		16	1
Benfica	2024–25	Primeira Liga	32	3	5	0	3	1	10 (Note: Appearances in UEFA Champions League)	0	2 (Note: Appearances in FIFA Club World Cup)	0	52	4
Benfica	Benfica total		43	4	6	0	4	1	13	0	2	0	68	5
Real Madrid	2025–26	La Liga	28	2	1	0	—		9	0	2 (Note: Appearances in Supercopa de España)	0	40	2
Real Madrid	2026–27	La Liga	6	1	0	0	—		4	0	0	0	10	1
Real Madrid	Total		34	3	1	0	—		13	0	2	0	50	3
Career total			129	7	10	0	5	1	26	0	8	0	178	8

== Honours ==
Benfica

- Taça da Liga: 2024–25

Individual

- Denzil Haroun Reserve Player of the Year: 2021–22
- Preston North End Young Player of the Year: 2022–23
- Primeira Liga Defender of the Month: March 2025
- Primera Liga Team of The Year: 2024–25
