= Kerem Aktürkoğlu =

Turkish footballer (born 1998)

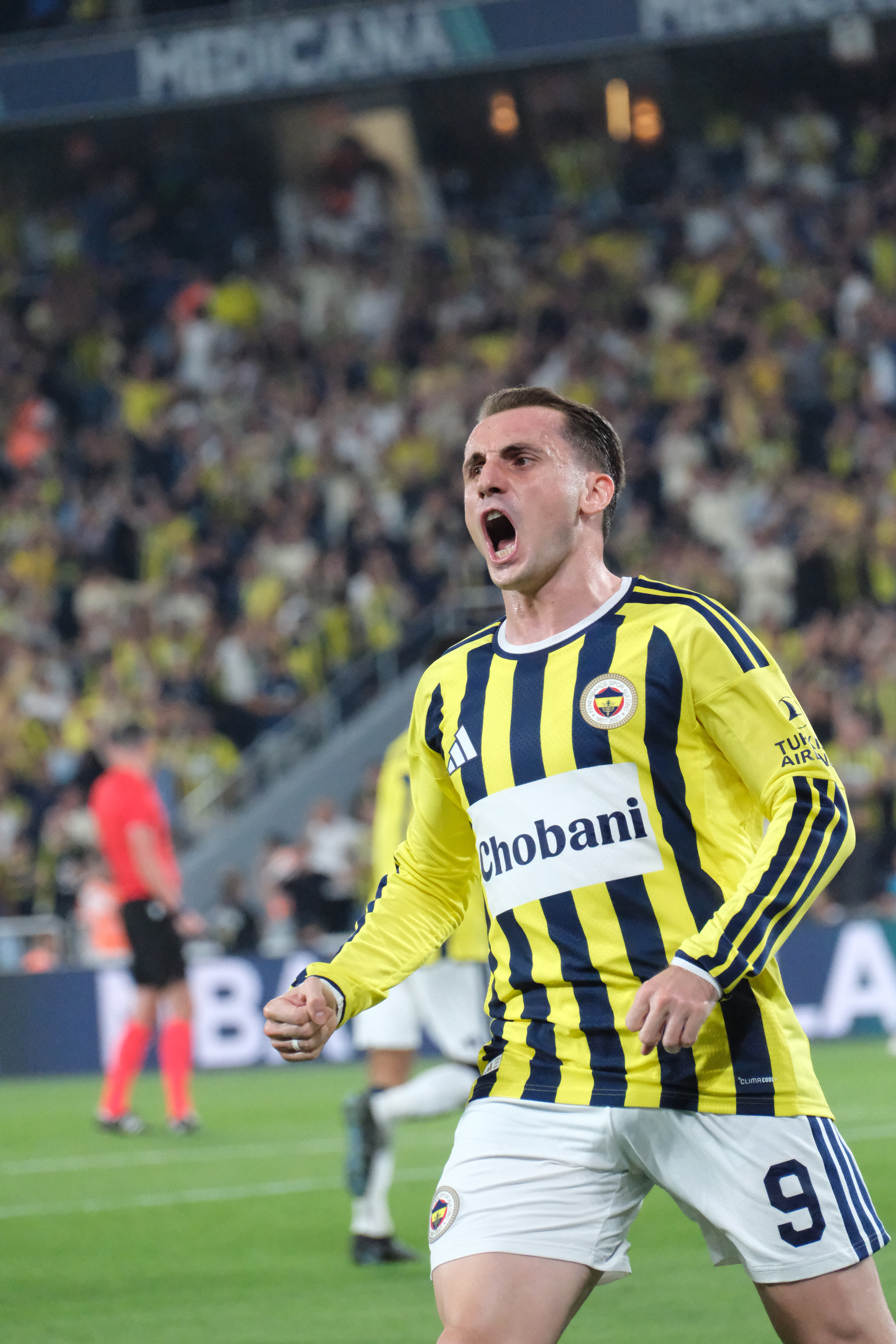
- Aktürkoğlu playing for Fenerbahçe in 2026

Personal information
- Full name: Muhammed Kerem Aktürkoğlu
- Date of birth: 21 October 1998 (age 28)
- Place of birth: İzmit, Turkey
- Height: 1.73 m (5 ft 8 in)
- Positions: Winger; wide midfielder

Team information
- Current team: Fenerbahçe
- Number: 7

Youth career
- 2011–2013: Gölcükspor
- 2013–2014: Hisareynspor
- 2014–2015: İstanbul Başakşehir

Senior career*
Years	Team	Apps	(Gls)
2015–2018	İstanbul Başakşehir	0	(0)
2016–2017	→ Bodrumspor (loan)	27	(4)
2018–2019	Karacabey Belediyespor	34	(3)
2019–2020	24 Erzincanspor	30	(20)
2020–2024	Galatasaray	138	(39)
2024–2025	Benfica	31	(11)
2025–	Fenerbahçe	38	(9)

International career^{‡}
2015	Turkey U18	2	(0)
2017	Turkey U19	2	(1)
2021–	Turkey	58	(15)
- * Club domestic league appearances and goals as of 8 November 2026 ‡ National team caps and goals as of 5 October 2026

Muhammed Kerem Aktürkoğlu (Turkish pronunciation: [ceˈɾɛm akˈtyɾkoːɫu]; born 21 October 1998) is a Turkish professional footballer who plays as a winger or wide midfielder for Süper Lig club Fenerbahçe and the Turkey national team.

Coming through İstanbul Başakşehir's youth academy, he made his debut in 2016, representing various club in the amateur Turkish TFF Third League, before moving to Süper Lig club Galatasaray in 2020 on a free transfer, where he made his professional debut and won two back-to-back league titles in 2023 and 2024. In September 2024, he joined Benfica for a transfer fee of €12 million.

Aktürkoğlu is a former Turkey youth international, representing his country at various levels. He made his senior international debut in 2021, being chosen in Turkey's squads for two UEFA European Championships (2020 and 2024) and one FIFA World Cup (2026).

== Early life ==
Aktürkoğlu was born on 21 October 1998 in İzmit, Turkey. At ten months old, he survived the 1999 İzmit earthquake.

== Club career ==
=== Early career ===
Aktürkoğlu began his football career at İstanbul Başakşehir's youth academy, signing his first professional contract with the club in 2015 at the age of 16. Despite his potential, he did not feature in any matches for Başakşehir during his four-year contract.

In 2016, he was loaned to Bodrumspor in the amateur TFF Third League to gain playing experience. Reflecting on his time at Başakşehir in a later interview, Aktürkoğlu expressed deep frustration, claiming that "four years of his life were stolen" due to a rigid hierarchy under Abdullah Avcı and Emre Belözoğlu, where senior players exercised significant authority over younger talents. This lack of opportunities brought him to the brink of quitting football, but encouragement from his family convinced him to persevere.

In 2017, Aktürkoğlu sought a fresh start and joined fellow Turkish TFF Third League side Karacabey Belediyespor on a free transfer in search of regular playing time. He became a key player for his new club, featuring in 35 matches over the season and contributing three goals and two assists. His efforts helped Karacabey reach the promotion play-offs, but the team was eliminated by Serik Belediyespor on July 15, 2019, following a narrow 4–3 aggregate loss.

After several seasons in the amateur leagues, Aktürkoğlu signed with 24 Erzincanspor ahead of the 2019–20 season, another free transfer that would prove pivotal in his career. His performances during the season improved, with a notable highlight being Erzincanspor's 2–0 victory over Beşiktaş in the fifth round of the Turkish Cup on 5 December 2019. Over the season, Aktürkoğlu scored an impressive 20 goals in 34 matches, playing a crucial role in his team's success. In the promotion play-offs, he scored his first career hat-trick in a 4–2 semi-final win against Artvin Hopaspor on 21 July 2020, and contributed to Erzincanspor's 2–1 victory against Aksaray Bld in the final four days later, securing promotion to the TFF 1. Lig.

=== Galatasaray ===
==== 2020–2022: Record-breaking individual success and Süper Lig's Player of the Season ====
On 2 September, Aktürkoğlu signed for Süper Lig club Galatasaray on a four-year contract on a free transfer. He made his professional debut with Galatasaray in a 1–1 league draw against Kayserispor on 23 November 2020, and scored his first goal for the club in a 3–0 win against Hatayspor on 5 December.

On 12 January 2021, having taken nearly three weeks to recover from COVID-19, he returned to action against Antalyaspor; he came off the bench in the late in second half in an eventual 0–0 home draw. On 17 April, Aktürkoğlu scored all three goals in a 3–1 league away draw win against Göztepe, becoming the third Turkish player to score a hat-trick for Galatasaray since Yasin Öztekin in December 2016.

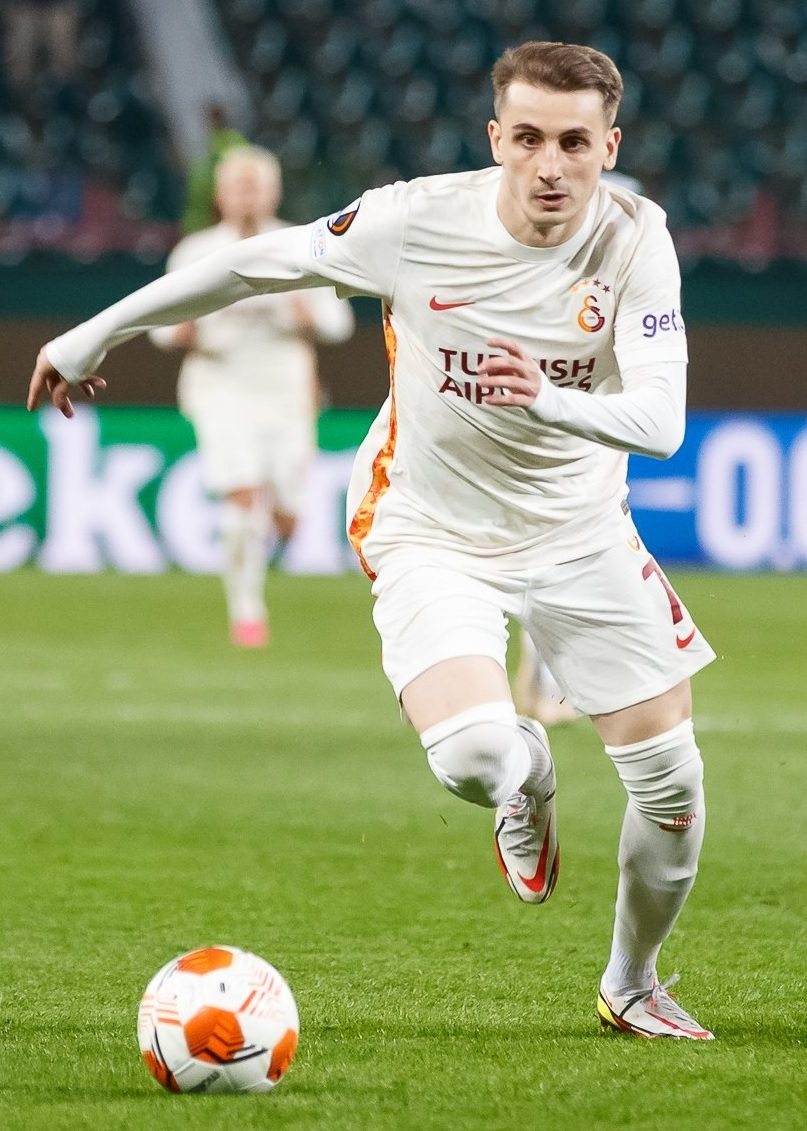
Aktürkoğlu playing for Galatasaray in 2021

On 16 August, Aktürkoğlu was involved in a physical altercation with teammate Marcão during a game against Giresunspor. The fight was broken up by their teammates, before the referee of the match, Erkan Özdamar, who watched the situation after the warning of the video assistant referee, sent-off Marcão. Unable to continue playing three minutes after the incident, Aktürkoğlu was taken off the field by manager Fatih Terim. Two days later, the club announced that Marcão had been suspended from the squad indefinitely and he was later fined and suspended for eight-matches by the Turkish Football Federation. Before Galatasaray training started on 9 September, Marcão publicly apologized to Aktürkoğlu in front of the entire team, with the two solving their issues.

On 21 October, he scored his first goal in European competitions, starting and scoring in a 1–0 victory away at Lokomotiv Moscow, in the UEFA Europa League group stage. On 14 March 2022, Aktürkoğlu scored a brace in a 2–1 win against rivals Beşiktaş. He finished the season, with 13 goals and 13 assists in all competitions, being named the Süper Lig Player of the Season, as he missed only one match due to a yellow card suspension, making him the player that feature the most matches in a season in Galatasaray's history, with 52 matches played. However, Galatasaray ended the season in a disappointing 13th place, failing to qualify to any European competition.

==== 2022–2023: Super Lig title and rise to leadership ====
On 15 December, Aktürkoğlu was named Galatasaray's third captain, alongside Fernando Muslera and Bafétimbi Gomis. During the league break for the 2022 FIFA World Cup, he established a strong partnership with the club's new signing, Mauro Icardi. This collaboration was highlighted on 12 November when Aktürkoğlu scored a hat-trick in a 7–0 away win against his former club Başakşehir, with Icardi providing two assists for his goals. His prolific form continued into January 2023, he scored the second goal, assisted by Icardi, in a 3–0 victory over crosstown rivals Fenerbahçe in the Intercontinental Derby on 8 January. This was followed by a goal in a 4–0 win against Hatayspor on 13 January and an assist in a 2–1 home win against Antalyaspor on 21 January.

After the league resumed in the aftermath of the 2023 Turkey–Syria earthquake, Aktürkoğlu picked up where he left off. On 14 April, he scored a goal and delivered two assists in a 6–0 win over Kayserispor. Four days later, he provided two more assists in a 4–1 victory against Alanyaspor. On 30 May, he recorded his first career hat-trick of assists in a 4–1 away win over Ankaragücü, securing Galatasaray's 23rd Süper Lig title. The following week, he added another assist in a 3–0 away win against rivals Fenerbahçe in the reverse fixture. Aktürkoğlu finished the season with nine goals and 12 assists, earning recognition as the Süper Lig's top assist provider and a place in the league's Best XI.

==== 2023–2024: Back-to-back league titles, vice-captaincy and departure ====
The following season, with Bafétimbi Gomis' departure, Aktürkoğlu was promoted to vice-captain. The arrival of Wilfried Zaha saw him transition to an attacking midfield role to accommodate Zaha on the left-wing. This positional shift led to competition with Dries Mertens for playing time, indirectly affecting his performances. Nevertheless, on 8 August, he scored his first goal of the season in a 3–0 away win against Olimpija Ljubljana in a 2022–23 Champions League third qualifying round. On 16 August, he netted twice and assisted another goal in a 4–2 home win over Samsunspor. By 26 September, he had accumulated eight goal contributions — three goals and five assists — in his first six league matches, the highest in the league at the time.

On 3 October, he scored his first UEFA Champions League goal during a 3–2 group stage victory against Manchester United at Old Trafford. He dedicated the goal to Palestinian children affected by the Gaza–Israel conflict. In the return fixture on 29 November, he came off the bench to score a crucial equalizer in a 3–3 home draw against Manchester United, a strike later awarded Goal of the Week for the fifth matchday of the Champions League. On 20 December, Aktürkoğlu captained Galatasaray for the first time, scoring the only goal in a 1–0 home win over Fatih Karagümrük.

On 11 January 2024, he was sent off for the first time in his career, during a league match against Sivasspor for dissent after shouting at the referee, resulting in a two-match suspension. Upon his return, he scored consecutive braces against Trabzonspor on 21 January and Istanbulspor on 25 January. Aktürkoğlu finished the season, with 12 goals and seven assists, playing a pivotal role as Galatasaray clinched their second consecutive Süper Lig title, setting a league record of 102 points.

=== Benfica ===
==== 2024–2025: Debut season abroad ====
On 3 September 2024, Aktürkoğlu joined Benfica on a five-year deal for a reported fee of €12 million, with the club also receiving 10% of a future transfer, and the release clause was set at €60 million. On 14 September, Aktürkoğlu scored on his debut for the club, netting the opener in a 4–1 home league victory over Santa Clara. He scored again in Benfica's opening game of their 2024–25 Champions League campaign, his first goal in the competition for them, opening their 2–1 win away over Red Star Belgrade.

On 27 October, he scored his first Primeira Liga hat-trick, netting three goals in the first half of a 5–0 victory over Rio Ave. In the process, he registered the most goals and assists (eight) for the club in his first seven matches reaching Félix Guerreiro's previous record set in the 1964–65 season. At the end of the month, he was named the league's Player of the Month and Forward of the Month for the months of September and October.

On 11 January 2025, Aktürkoğlu won his first trophy with Benfica, as they defeated crosstown rivals Sporting CP in the Taça da Liga final on penalties, converting Benfica's fourth penalty in the shoot-out; following a 1–1 draw in normal time. On 18 February, in the second leg of the Champions League knockout phase play-offs, he ended his two-month goal drought, scoring the first goal in a 3–3 home draw over Monaco, helping his side secure a 4–3 aggregate victory to advance to the Champions League round of 16.

==== 2025–2026: Champions League qualification ====
On 27 August 2025, Aktürkoğlu scored the only goal in a 1–0 victory over Fenerbahçe in the Champions League qualifying play-off round, securing his club's place in the competition's league phase.

=== Fenerbahçe ===
On 1 September 2025, Fenerbahçe signed four-year deal with him, and Benfica announced the transfer for €22.5m and adds on. Later that month, on 14 September, he made his debut with the team in a 1–0 Süper Lig victory against Trabzonspor. A month later, on 2 October, he scored a brace against OGC Nice in 2–1 UEFA Europa League group match home win. On 9 November, he scored his first Süper Lig goal with Fenerbahçe in 4–2 home win against Kayserispor.

On 9 February 2026, he scored a brace against Gençlerbirliği in a 3–1 Süper Lig home win. Following week on 14 February 2026, Kerem scored again in 3–2 Süper Lig away win against Trabzonspor and also assisted to Marco Asensio's winning goal. Later that month, on 26 February, he scored another brace in a 2–1 UEFA Europa League away won against Nottingham Forest.

== International career ==
Aktürkoğlu represented Turkey at under-18 and under-19 levels, for a total of four caps. He made his senior international debut on 27 May 2021 in a friendly against Azerbaijan. On 1 June 2021, he was named in the Turkish squad for the postponed UEFA Euro 2020, but did not make an appearance in an eventual group stage exit. He scored his first international goal on 8 October 2021 in a 1–1 home draw against Norway in a 2022 FIFA World Cup qualification match.

On 7 June 2024, he was named in Turkey's 26-man squad for the UEFA Euro 2024. On 18 June, he scored Turkey's third goal in a 3–1 victory against Georgia in the opening match of the European competition. He made a further four appearances for the quarter-finalists.

On 9 September 2024, Aktürkoğlu scored his first international hat-trick against Iceland in a 3–1 win in the UEFA Nations League. On 31 March 2026, he scored the only goal in a 1–0 away win over Kosovo in the 2026 FIFA World Cup European play-off final, qualifying his nation to the World Cup for the first time since 2002.

On 2 June 2026, Aktürkoğlu was selected in the 26-man squad for the 2026 FIFA World Cup.

== Player profile ==
=== Style of play ===
Primarily a left winger, he has adapted to other roles, including attacking midfielder or second striker. His dribbling, agility, and ball control enable him to outmaneuver defenders and create chances in tight spaces. He cuts inside to shoot or delivers incisive passes, exploiting defensive gaps. His pace and precision make him a counterattacking threat, stretching defenses and delivering accurate crosses with both feet.

=== Goal celebration ===
Aktürkoğlu adopted his Expelliarmus goal celebration in response to the nickname "Kerem Potter," given by fans in July 2021 after he shared an Instagram photo wearing round glasses and Galatasaray's red and yellow kit, resembling Harry Potter's Gryffindor uniform. Fans flooded the post with wand and lightning emojis, inspiring Aktürkoğlu to embrace the persona. He debuted the celebration on 25 December 2021, during a match against Fenerbahçe, mimicking a spell-casting motion from the Harry Potter series. The gesture delighted fans and reinforced his "Kerem Potter" identity, earning him the nickname "the magician" in during matches.

== Personal life ==
Aktürkoğlu is a practicing Muslim, and made the Umrah pilgrimage to Mecca. In September 2024, Aktürkoğlu started his own Kick channel, under his surname Akturkoglu, uploading gaming streams and fan Q&As.

He provided both financial and moral support to victims of the 2023 Turkey–Syria earthquake. Actively participating in the "We Are Together" campaign, he encouraged citizens to host displaced individuals, especially in Hatay, one of the hardest-hit Turkish regions. He also donated the match ball from his hat-trick against Başakşehir to an auction, with the proceeds aiding earthquake recovery efforts in his home country.

== Career statistics ==
=== Club ===
As of match played 8 November 2026

Appearances and goals by club, season and competition
Club	Season	League			National cup (Note: Includes Turkish Cup, Taça de Portugal)		League cup (Note: Includes Taça da Liga)		Europe		Other		Total	
Club	Season	Division	Apps	Goals	Apps	Goals	Apps	Goals	Apps	Goals	Apps	Goals	Apps	Goals
Istanbul Başakşehir	2016–17	Süper Lig	0	0	0	0	—		0	0	—		0	0
Bodrumspor (loan)	2016–17	TFF Third League	27	4	1	0	—		—		—		28	4
Karacabey Belediyespor	2018–19	TFF Third League	34	3	1	0	—		—		—		35	3
24 Erzincanspor	2019–20	TFF Third League	30	20	4	0	—		—		—		34	20
Galatasaray	2020–21	Süper Lig	27	6	2	0	—		0	0	—		29	6
Galatasaray	2021–22	Süper Lig	37	10	1	0	—		14 (Note: Two appearances in UEFA Champions League, twelve appearances and three goals in UEFA Europa League)	3	—		52	13
Galatasaray	2022–23	Süper Lig	34	9	4	1	—		—		—		38	10
Galatasaray	2023–24	Süper Lig	37	12	2	0	—		14 (Note: Twelve appearances and three goals in UEFA Champions League, two appearances in UEFA Europa League)	3	1 (Note: Appearance(s) in Turkish Super Cup)	0	54	15
Galatasaray	2024–25	Süper Lig	3	2	—		—		2 (Note: Appearance(s) in UEFA Champions League)	0	1	0	6	2
Galatasaray	Total		138	39	9	1	—		30	6	2	0	179	46
Benfica	2024–25	Primeira Liga	30	11	4	1	3	0	12	4	4 (Note: Appearance(s) in FIFA Club World Cup)	0	53	16
Benfica	2025–26	Primeira Liga	1	0	—		—		3	1	1 (Note: Appearance in Supertaça Cândido de Oliveira)	0	5	1
Benfica	Total		31	11	4	1	3	0	15	5	5	0	58	17
Fenerbahçe	2025–26	Süper Lig	29	8	4	0	—		9 (Note: Appearances in UEFA Europa League)	6	2	1	44	15
Fenerbahçe	2026–27	Süper Lig	9	1	0	0	—		8	0	0	0	17	1
Fenerbahçe	Total		38	9	4	0	—		17	6	2	1	61	16
Career total			297	86	23	2	3	0	62	17	9	1	394	106

=== International ===
As of match played 5 October 2026

Appearances and goals by national team and year
National team	Year	Apps	Goals
Turkey	2021	8	3
Turkey	2022	9	0
Turkey	2023	9	2
Turkey	2024	14	5
Turkey	2025	9	4
Turkey	2026	9	1
Total		58	15

Scores and results list Turkey's goal tally first, score column indicates score after each Aktürkoğlu goal.

List of international goals scored by Kerem Aktürkoğlu
No.	Date	Venue	Cap	Opponent	Score	Result	Competition
1	8 October 2021	Şükrü Saracoğlu Stadium, Istanbul, Turkey	5	Norway	1–0	1–1	2022 FIFA World Cup qualification
2	13 November 2021	Başakşehir Fatih Terim Stadium, Istanbul, Turkey	7	Gibraltar	1–0	6–0	2022 FIFA World Cup qualification
3	16 November 2021	Podgorica City Stadium, Podgorica, Montenegro	8	Montenegro	1–1	2–1	2022 FIFA World Cup qualification
4	25 March 2023	Vazgen Sargsyan Republican Stadium, Yerevan, Armenia	18	Armenia	2–1	2–1	UEFA Euro 2024 qualifying
5	15 October 2023	Konya Metropolitan Municipality Stadium, Konya, Turkey	24	Latvia	3–0	4–0	UEFA Euro 2024 qualifying
6	18 June 2024	Westfalenstadion, Dortmund, Germany	30	Georgia	3–1	3–1	UEFA Euro 2024
7	9 September 2024	Gürsel Aksel Stadium, İzmir, Turkey	36	Iceland	1–0	3–1	2024–25 UEFA Nations League B
8	9 September 2024	Gürsel Aksel Stadium, İzmir, Turkey	36	Iceland	2–1	3–1	2024–25 UEFA Nations League B
9	9 September 2024	Gürsel Aksel Stadium, İzmir, Turkey	36	Iceland	3–1	3–1	2024–25 UEFA Nations League B
10	15 October 2024	Laugardalsvöllur, Reykjavík, Iceland	38	Iceland	4–2	4–2	2024–25 UEFA Nations League B
11	20 March 2025	Rams Park, Istanbul, Turkey	41	Hungary	2–1	3–1	2024–25 UEFA Nations League promotion/relegation play-offs
12	7 June 2025	Pratt & Whitney Stadium, East Hartford, United States	43	United States	2–1	2–1	Friendly
13	4 September 2025	Boris Paichadze National Stadium, Tbilisi, Georgia	45	Georgia	2–0	3–2	2026 FIFA World Cup qualification
14	4 September 2025	Boris Paichadze National Stadium, Tbilisi, Georgia	45	Georgia	3–0	3–2	2026 FIFA World Cup qualification
15	31 March 2026	Fadil Vokrri Stadium, Pristina, Kosovo	51	Kosovo	1–0	1–0	2026 World Cup qualification play-offs

== Honours ==
Bodrum F.K.

- TFF 3. Lig: 2016–17

Galatasaray

- Süper Lig: 2022–23, 2023–24
- Turkish Super Cup: 2023

Benfica

- Taça da Liga: 2024–25
- Supertaça Cândido de Oliveira: 2025

Fenerbahçe

- Turkish Super Cup: 2025

Individual

- Süper Lig Player of the Season: 2021–22
- Süper Lig top assist provider: 2022–23
- Süper Lig Team of the Season: 2022–23
- Primeira Liga Player of the Month: September/October 2024
- Primeira Liga Forward of the Month: September/October 2024,
