= Nicolás Otamendi =

Argentine footballer (born 1988)

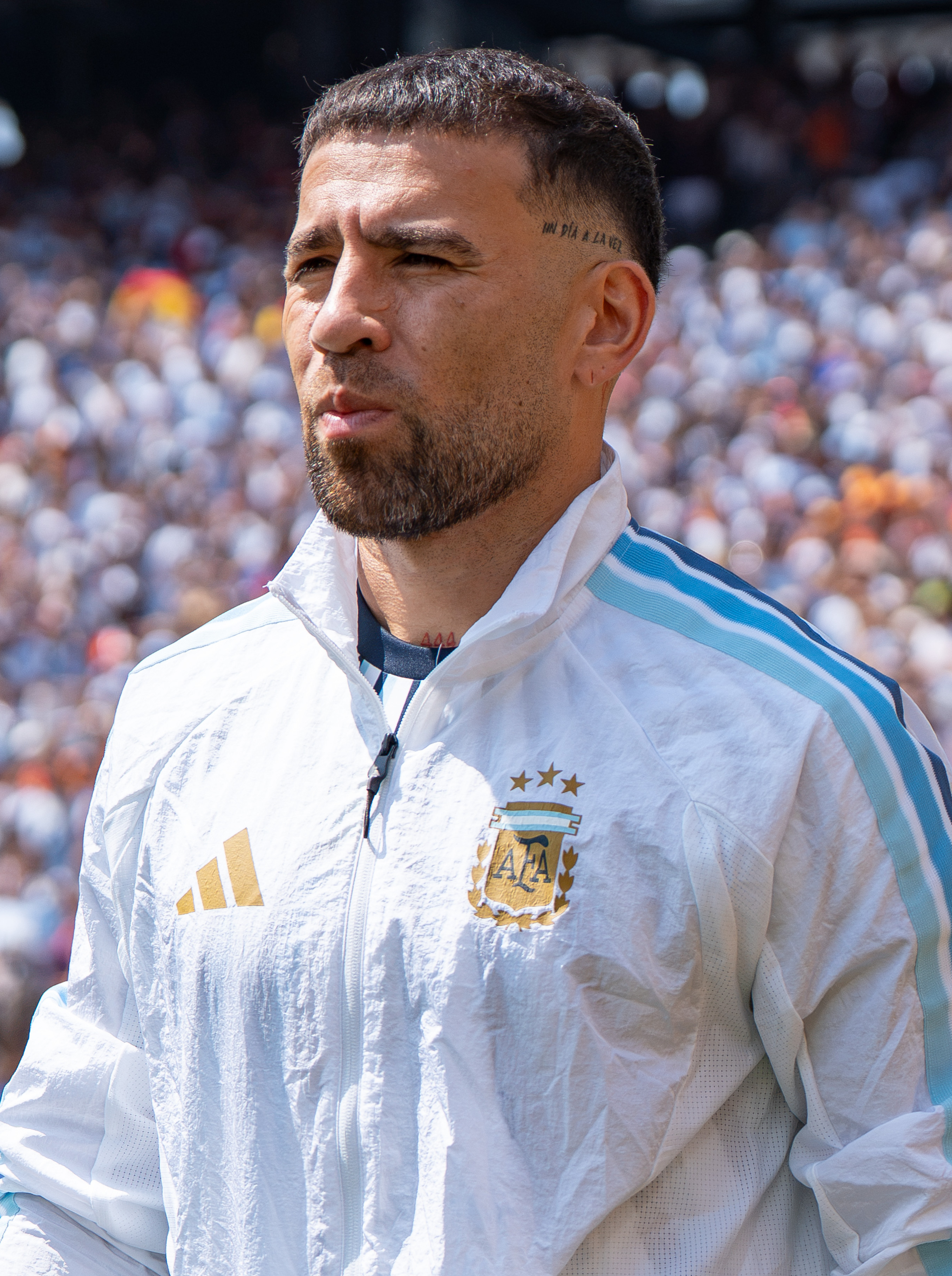
- Otamendi with Argentina in 2026

Personal information
- Full name: Nicolás Hernán Gonzalo Otamendi
- Date of birth: 12 February 1988 (age 38)
- Place of birth: Buenos Aires, Argentina
- Height: 1.83 m (6 ft 0 in)
- Position: Centre-back

Team information
- Current team: River Plate
- Number: 30

Youth career
- 1995–2007: Vélez Sarsfield

Senior career*
Years	Team	Apps	(Gls)
2007–2010	Vélez Sarsfield	40	(1)
2010–2014	Porto	77	(7)
2014–2015	Valencia	35	(6)
2014	→ Atlético Mineiro (loan)	12	(1)
2015–2020	Manchester City	136	(8)
2020–2026	Benfica	178	(12)
2026–	River Plate	16	(0)

International career
2009–2026	Argentina	140	(9)
2024	Argentina Olympic (O.P.)	4	(0)
Medal record
Men's football
Representing Argentina
FIFA World Cup
Winner	2022 Qatar
Runner-up	2026 Canada–Mexico–US
Copa América
Winner	2021 Brazil
Winner	2024 United States
Runner-up	2015 Chile
Runner-up	2016 United States
Third place	2019 Brazil
CONMEBOL–UEFA Cup of Champions
Winner	2022 England
- * Club domestic league appearances and goals as of 22:45, 5 November 2026 (UTC)

Nicolás Hernán Gonzalo Otamendi (born 12 February 1988) is an Argentine professional footballer who plays as a centre-back for and captains Argentine Primera División club River Plate.

Otamendi played for Vélez Sarsfield and Porto in his early career, winning eight major titles with Porto, including three Primeira Liga championships and the 2011 Europa League. He signed for Valencia in 2014 and spent four months on loan to Atlético Mineiro of Brazil. In 2015, he moved to Manchester City and won back-to-back Premier League titles in 2018 and 2019, as well as four League Cups and an FA Cup. In 2020, Otamendi returned to Portugal with Benfica, where he won another league title and the Portuguese League Cup.

An Argentina international from 2009 to 2026, Otamendi made 140 appearances and represented his country at four FIFA World Cups and five Copas América. After consecutive runner-up finishes in the latter tournament, Otamendi won the 2021 Copa América on his fourth attempt, and would then lift the 2022 World Cup the following year, playing every single minute of Argentina's campaign. In 2024, Otamendi won a second consecutive Copa América title.

== Club career ==
=== Vélez ===
Born in Buenos Aires, Otamendi made his Primera División debut for Velez Sarsfield on 10 May 2008, in a 2–1 home win against Rosario Central for the Clausura tournament. During manager Hugo Tocalli's spell he was only fifth-choice stopper, behind Waldo Ponce, Fernando Tobio, Marco Torsiglieri and Mariano Uglessich. However, his role in the first team changed during Ricardo Gareca's first season as head coach, the 2009 Clausura: he replaced Ponce for the third game after the Chilean was injured while playing for his national team, and eventually won a starting position alongside Sebastián Domínguez, playing 17 of the 19 games in Vélez's winning campaign.

Otamendi scored his first professional goal during the 2009 Apertura, in a 3–1 victory over Arsenal de Sarandí. During that season he also made his debut in an international club competition, appearing in the Copa Sudamericana; in recognition of his performances throughout the year he was chosen for the South American Team of the Year, in a traditional continent-wide journalists' poll conducted by the newspaper El País.

=== Porto ===
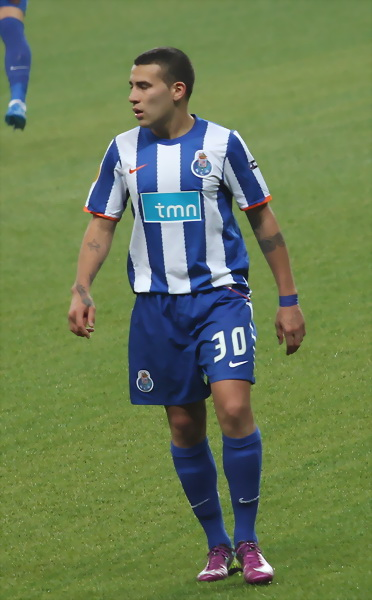
Otamendi playing for Porto in 2010

On 23 August 2010, Otamendi was transferred to Portuguese side Porto on a €4 million fee, signing a five-year contract. Vélez also retained 50% of his registration rights, with the player having a pre-set price of another €4 million to be met by Porto prior to September 2011. He netted in his first match, a 2–0 home victory over Olhanense, finishing his first season with 15 appearances and five goals (notably both in a 2–0 away win against Braga) as the northerners won the Primeira Liga championship.

On 6 September 2011, Porto exercised the rights to sign the remainder of Otamendi's playing rights. He played 30 official games during the season to help the club to another two major titles, notably the back-to-back domestic league.

=== Valencia ===
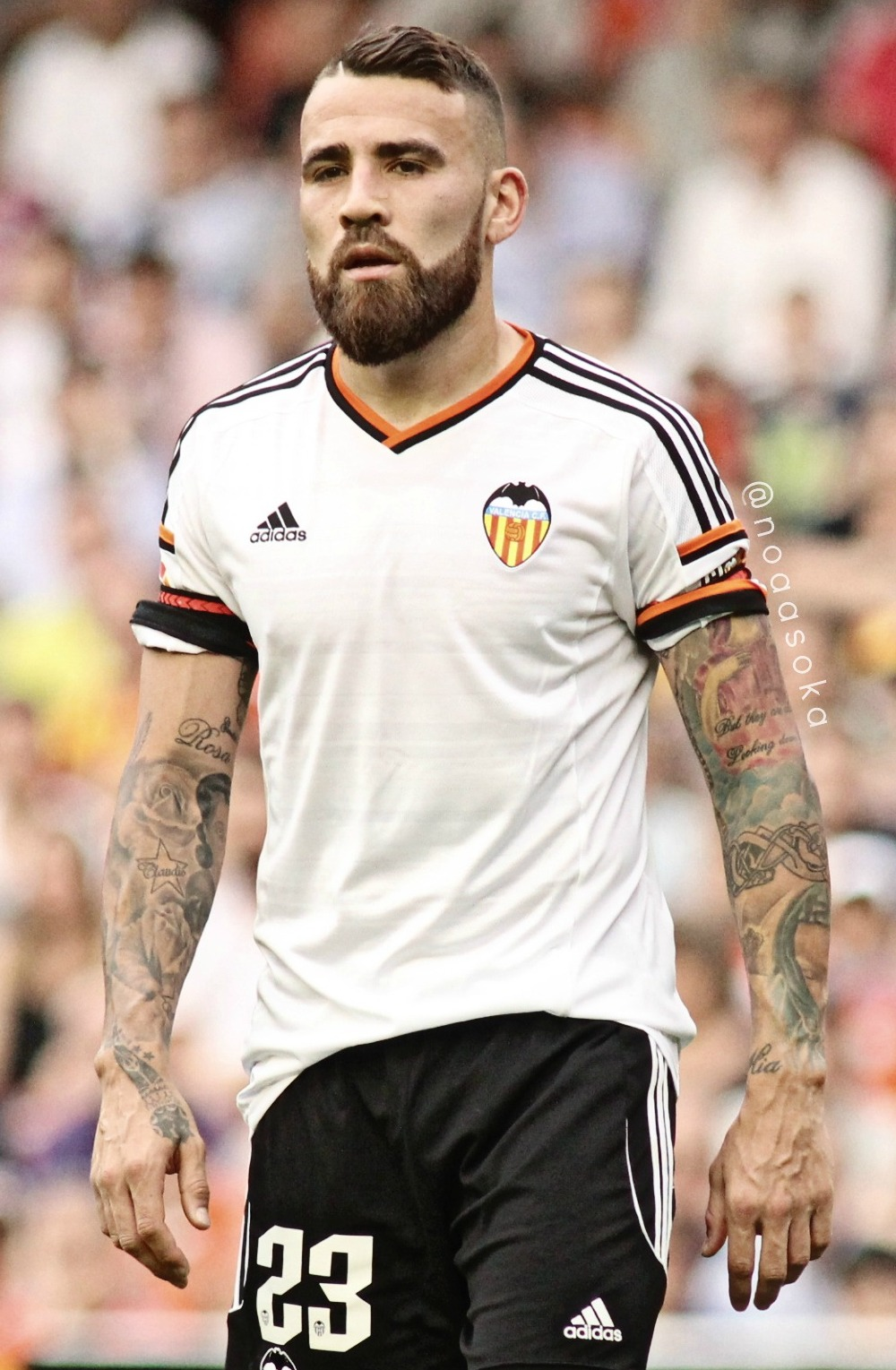
Otamendi with Valencia in 2015

On 5 February 2014, Otamendi was sold to Valencia in La Liga for €12 million, on a five-year contract starting on 1 July. He was immediately loaned to Atlético Mineiro in Brazil, and played 19 times for the team from Belo Horizonte, scoring once to open a 4–1 win at city rivals América Mineiro on 23 March in the first leg of the semi-finals of the state championship.

Otamendi made his debut in the Spanish top level on 23 August 2014, starting in a 1–1 away draw against Sevilla. He scored his first goal for his new club on 4 October, helping to a 3–1 home success over Atlético Madrid.

On 4 January 2015, Otamendi headed Valencia's winner in a 2–1 home win over Real Madrid, ending their opponents' club record 22-match winning streak as a result. After helping Los Che qualify for the UEFA Champions League for the first time in four years, becoming the first club stopper to score six goals in the league in the process, he was the only player from his team to be named in the La Liga Team of the Year.

=== Manchester City ===
Late into the 2015 pre-season, Otamendi refused to train or play with Valencia to avoid thwarting his chances of signing with another club. On 20 August, he joined Manchester City on a five-year deal for a fee of £32 million. He made his debut on 15 September, coming on as a 75th-minute substitute for Vincent Kompany in a 1–2 home loss against Juventus for the Champions League group phase; his Premier League debut came four days later, in a 1–2 defeat to West Ham United at the City of Manchester Stadium.

On 31 October 2015, Otamendi scored his first goal for the club in a 2–1 home win over Norwich City. He played the full 120 minutes as they won the Football League Cup on 28 February 2016, defeating Liverpool on a penalty shootout in the final.

On 1 November 2017, Otamendi netted his first UEFA Champions League goal in a 4–2 away win over Napoli. A month later, on 10 December, he scored the winning goal in the Manchester derby at Old Trafford, helping City stretch their lead at the top of the Premier League to 11 points. City would go on to lift the Premier League title that season with a record-breaking 100 points, this was Otamendi's first league title in England. On 18 April 2018, Otamendi was named in the PFA Team of the Year alongside Manchester City teammates Kyle Walker, David Silva, Kevin De Bruyne and Sergio Agüero.

In the 2018–19 season, Otamendi helped Manchester City become the second English side to win a domestic men's treble, consisting of the League Cup, Premier League title and FA Cup.

In his final season at Manchester City, Otamendi made 39 appearances in total. He also helped his side retain the League Cup for the third season in a row in March 2020, his final trophy with City.

=== Benfica ===
On 29 September 2020, Otamendi moved to former club Porto's rivals Benfica, signing a three-year contract for a €15 million fee, with Benfica defender Rúben Dias moving to Manchester City for a larger fee as part of the deal. He made his league debut in a 3–2 win against Farense on 4 October. On 8 February 2021, he scored his first goal for the club in a 2–0 victory over Famalicão.

As captain, he steered the team to the 2022–23 Primeira Liga triumph. On 4 January 2025, he made his 200th appearance for the club in a 2–1 defeat against Braga. He reached his 100th Champions League appearance on 28 January 2026, featuring in a 4–2 victory against Real Madrid. He announced his departure from the club by the end of the 2025–26 season.

=== River Plate ===
On 29 May 2026, Otamendi signed a one-year contract with River Plate.

== International career ==
=== 2009–2010: Debut and 2010 World Cup ===
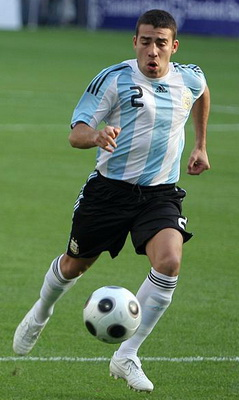
Otamendi playing for Argentina in 2009

In April 2009, Otamendi was called up by Argentina national team coach Diego Maradona for a friendly with Panama. At the time of his selection he had only played 11 professional games, and eventually started the match on 20 May, in a 3–1 win.

During the 2010 FIFA World Cup qualifying campaign, Otamendi played as a centre back alongside Martín Demichelis against Ecuador (0–2 away loss), partnered former Vélez teammate Domínguez against Brazil in a 1–3 home defeat and appeared as a right back in a 1–0 win in Uruguay which sealed the country's qualification to South Africa. On 19 May 2010 he was confirmed as part of the 23-men squad for the final stages, featuring in the starting eleven for the final group stage game against Greece; on the press conference after the match, Maradona said that, in his opinion, he was the best player on the field.

Otamendi also played the 90 minutes of the round-of-16 game against Mexico, which Argentina won by 3–1. His final appearance in the tournament was the 0–4 quarter-final loss to Germany: this time his performance received criticism by the football press, as did his manager's decision to improvise him on the right-back position; however, the player subsequently stated his desire to always play for his national team, even if not in his natural position.

=== 2011–2021: First Copa América title ===
Otamendi scored his first goal for Argentina on 2 September 2011, in a 1–0 friendly win over Venezuela in Kolkata, after heading a corner taken by Lionel Messi. After being cut from the squad that later appeared at the 2014 World Cup, he was selected by coach Gerardo Martino for the 2015 Copa América, playing the entirety of all but one match as they lost 1–4 to hosts Chile on a penalty shootout in the final; he was named in the Team of the Tournament.

Otamendi started all the games in the Copa América Centenario in the United States, in which Argentina again both faced Chile in the tournament final and lost in a penalty shootout, 2–4. In the second group match against Panama, on 10 June 2016, he scored the opening goal in a 5–0 win.

Otamendi was included in Jorge Sampaoli's squad for the 2018 World Cup. On 30 June, he played the entire match as Argentina were eliminated by France after losing 3–4 in the round-of-16.

In June 2021, he was included in Lionel Scaloni's final 28-man squad for the 2021 Copa América. On 10 July, he played the entire match as Argentina defeated Brazil 1–0 in the final to win the Copa América.

On 1 June 2022, Otamendi played the entire match as Argentina won 3–0 against reigning European Champions Italy at Wembley in the 2022 Finalissima.

=== 2022 World Cup triumph ===
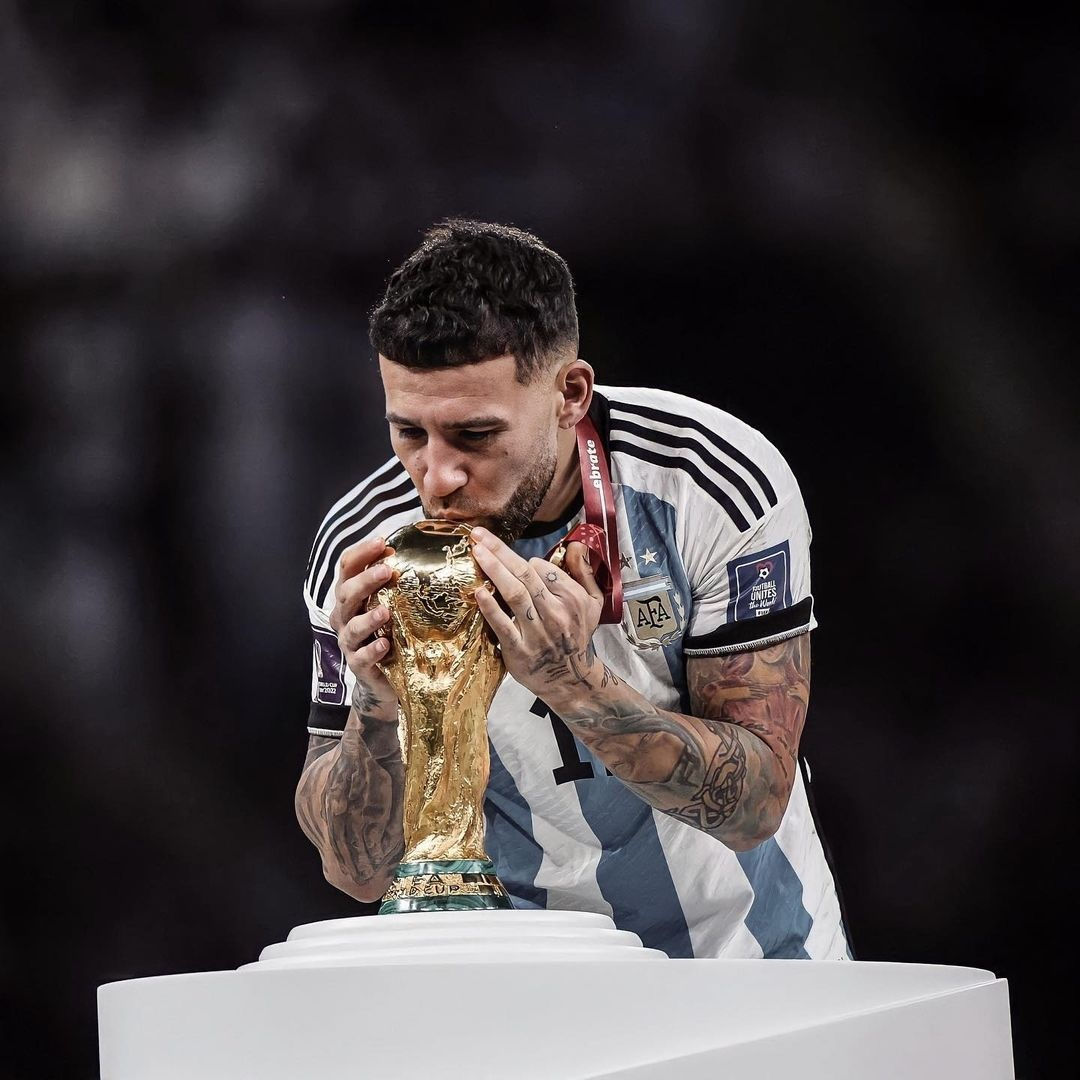
Otamendi kissing the FIFA World Cup Trophy after winning with Argentina in 2022

He was included in the Argentina squad for the 2022 World Cup by Lionel Scaloni. On 18 December 2022, in his 100th international cap, he fouled Randal Kolo Muani to give away the penalty for France's opening goal in the final, where Argentina eventually won 4–2 in the penalty shoot-out after the match ended 3–3 at extra-time, to win the World Cup. He played every single minute of the tournament.

=== 2023–2025: Second Copa América title ===
On 21 November 2023, he scored the decisive goal in a 1–0 victory over Brazil at the Maracanã stadium, in what would be the Canarinha's first defeat ever in home soil in world cup qualification tournaments.

In June 2024, Otamendi was included in Lionel Scaloni's final 26-man Argentina squad for the 2024 Copa América. During the tournament, he scored the decisive penalty against Ecuador in a 4–2 victory in the shootout in the quarter-finals after a 1–1 draw. He competed for Argentina at the 2024 Summer Olympics.

=== 2026 World Cup and retirement ===
Otamendi playing for Argentina at the 2026 FIFA World Cup final

On 28 May 2026, Otamendi was selected in the 26-man squad for the 2026 FIFA World Cup. Otamendi was used mainly as a substitute during the World Cup, making an impact off the bench in the knockout stages, including a 72nd-minute appearance in the semi-final victory over England. He featured in the World Cup final at the age of 38 years and 157 days, becoming the second-oldest outfield player to appear in the tournament's final, behind only his teammate Lionel Messi, as his side lost 1–0 to Spain after extra time. He also reached his 21st World Cup appearance, equaling Diego Maradona for second place among Argentina players, behind only Lionel Messi. On 23 July 2026, he announced his retirement from international football following the conclusion of the tournament, ending his 17-year international career. However, later that year, on 6 October, he returned in the national team to play in Lionel Messi's farewell match, where he scored the opening goal, in a 3–0 victory over Benin.

== Career statistics ==
=== Club ===
As of match played 5 November 2026

Appearances and goals by club, season and competition
Club	Season	League			National cup (Note: Includes Taça de Portugal, Copa del Rey, FA Cup)		League cup (Note: Includes Taça da Liga, EFL Cup)		Continental		Other		Total	
Club	Season	Division	Apps	Goals	Apps	Goals	Apps	Goals	Apps	Goals	Apps	Goals	Apps	Goals
Vélez Sarsfield	2007–08	Argentine Primera División	1	0	—		—		0	0	—		1	0
Vélez Sarsfield	2008–09	Argentine Primera División	18	0	—		—		—		—		18	0
Vélez Sarsfield	2009–10	Argentine Primera División	19	1	—		—		14 (Note: Eight appearances in Copa Libertadores, six appearances in Copa Sudamericana)	0	—		33	1
Vélez Sarsfield	2010–11	Argentine Primera División	2	0	—		—		0	0	—		2	0
Vélez Sarsfield	Total		40	1	—		—		14	0	—		54	1
Porto	2010–11	Primeira Liga	15	5	2	0	2	0	13 (Note: Appearances in UEFA Europa League)	1	—		32	6
Porto	2011–12	Primeira Liga	20	2	1	0	2	0	6 (Note: Five appearances in UEFA Champions League, one appearance in UEFA Europa League)	0	1 (Note: Appearance in UEFA Super Cup)	0	30	2
Porto	2012–13	Primeira Liga	29	0	2	0	3	1	8 (Note: Appearances in UEFA Champions League)	0	1 (Note: Appearance in Supertaça Cândido de Oliveira)	0	43	1
Porto	2013–14	Primeira Liga	13	0	2	1	0	0	4	0	1	0	20	1
Porto	Total		77	7	7	1	7	1	31	1	3	0	125	10
Atlético Mineiro (loan)	2014	Série A	5	0	0	0	—		7 (Note: Appearances in Copa Libertadores)	0	7 (Note: Appearances in Campeonato Mineiro)	1	19	1
Valencia	2014–15	La Liga	35	6	3	0	—		—		—		38	6
Manchester City	2015–16	Premier League	30	1	2	0	5	0	12	0	—		49	1
Manchester City	2016–17	Premier League	30	1	5	0	1	0	7	0	—		43	1
Manchester City	2017–18	Premier League	34	4	2	0	2	0	8	1	—		46	5
Manchester City	2018–19	Premier League	18	0	5	1	4	0	5	0	1 (Note: Appearance in FA Community Shield)	0	33	1
Manchester City	2019–20	Premier League	24	2	3	0	3	1	8	0	1	0	39	3
Manchester City	Total		136	8	17	1	15	1	40	1	2	0	210	11
Benfica	2020–21	Primeira Liga	27	1	4	0	0	0	6	0	1	0	38	1
Benfica	2021–22	Primeira Liga	28	0	1	0	1	0	13	0	—		43	0
Benfica	2022–23	Primeira Liga	31	1	2	0	0	0	13	1	—		46	2
Benfica	2023–24	Primeira Liga	31	2	5	1	2	1	12 (Note: Six appearances in UEFA Champions League, six appearances in UEFA Europa League)	0	1	0	51	4
Benfica	2024–25	Primeira Liga	31	6	4	0	3	0	12	1	4 (Note: Appearances in FIFA Club World Cup)	1	54	8
Benfica	2025–26	Primeira Liga	30	2	2	0	2	1	14	0	1	0	49	3
Benfica	Total		178	12	18	1	8	2	70	2	7	1	281	18
River Plate	2026	Argentine Primera División	16	0	0	0	—		2 (Note: Appearances in Copa Sudamericana)	0	—		18	0
Career total			487	34	45	3	30	4	164	4	19	2	745	47

=== International ===
Appearances and goals by national team and year
National team	Year	Apps	Goals
Argentina	2009	5	0
Argentina	2010	5	0
Argentina	2011	5	1
Argentina	2012	0	0
Argentina	2013	1	0
Argentina	2014	2	0
Argentina	2015	12	0
Argentina	2016	13	2
Argentina	2017	8	0
Argentina	2018	8	1
Argentina	2019	11	0
Argentina	2020	4	0
Argentina	2021	13	0
Argentina	2022	13	0
Argentina	2023	9	2
Argentina	2024	14	1
Argentina	2025	6	0
Argentina	2026	11	2
Total		140	9

Scores and results list Argentina's goal tally first, score column indicates score after each Otamendi goal.

List of international goals scored by Nicolás Otamendi
No.	Date	Venue	Cap	Opponent	Score	Result	Competition
1	2 September 2011	Salt Lake Stadium, Kolkata, India	12	Venezuela	1–0	1–0	Friendly
2	10 June 2016	Soldier Field, Chicago, United States	34	Panama	1–0	5–0	Copa América Centenario
3	6 September 2016	Metropolitano de Mérida, Mérida, Venezuela	40	Venezuela	2–2	2–2	2018 FIFA World Cup qualification
4	27 March 2018	Metropolitano Stadium, Madrid, Spain	53	Spain	1–2	1–6	Friendly
5	12 October 2023	Estadio Monumental, Buenos Aires, Argentina	106	Paraguay	1–0	1–0	2026 FIFA World Cup qualification
6	21 November 2023	Maracanã Stadium, Rio de Janeiro, Brazil	109	Brazil	1–0	1–0	2026 FIFA World Cup qualification
7	10 October 2024	Estadio Monumental, Maturín, Venezuela	120	Venezuela	1–0	1–1	2026 FIFA World Cup qualification
8	31 March 2026	La Bombonera, Buenos Aires, Argentina	130	Zambia	3–0	5–0	Friendly
9	6 October 2026	Estadio Monumental, Buenos Aires, Argentina	140	Benin	1–0	3–0	Friendly

== Honours ==
Vélez

- Argentine Primera División: 2009 Clausura

Porto

- Primeira Liga: 2010–11, 2011–12, 2012–13
- Taça de Portugal: 2010–11
- Supertaça Cândido de Oliveira: 2011, 2012, 2013
- UEFA Europa League: 2010–11

Manchester City

- Premier League: 2017–18, 2018–19
- FA Cup: 2018–19
- Football League/EFL Cup: 2015–16, 2017–18, 2018–19, 2019–20
- FA Community Shield: 2018, 2019

Benfica

- Primeira Liga: 2022–23
- Taça da Liga: 2024–25
- Supertaça Cândido de Oliveira: 2023, 2025

Argentina

- FIFA World Cup: 2022
- Copa América: 2021, 2024
- CONMEBOL–UEFA Cup of Champions: 2022

Individual

- South American Team of the Year: 2009
- O Jogo Primeira Liga Team of the Year: 2012
- La Liga Team of the Season: 2014–15
- Copa América Team of the Tournament: 2015, 2016
- PFA Team of the Year: 2017–18 Premier League
- ESM Team of the Season: 2017–18
- IFFHS Team of the Copa América: 2021
- IFFHS Men's CONMEBOL Team: 2022, 2023
- Primeira Liga Team of the Year: 2022–23, 2024–25
- Primeira Liga Defender of the Month: April 2025
- Cosme Damião Awards – Footballer of the Year: 2024
