= Nuno Félix =

Portuguese footballer

Personal information
- Full name: Nuno Miguel Madeira Fernandes Félix
- Date of birth: 16 March 2004 (age 22)
- Place of birth: Portimão, Portugal
- Height: 1.82 m (6 ft 0 in)
- Position: Defensive midfielder

Team information
- Current team: Benfica
- Number: 60

Youth career
- 2012–2016: Portimonense
- 2016–2021: Benfica

Senior career*
Years	Team	Apps	(Gls)
2021–	Benfica B	61	(4)
2025–	Benfica	2	(0)

International career^{‡}
2021–2022	Portugal U18	11	(1)
2022–2023	Portugal U19	12	(1)
2023–2024	Portugal U20	5	(1)
Medal record
Men's football
Representing Portugal
UEFA European Under-19 Championship
Runner-up	2023 Malta
- * Club domestic league appearances and goals as of 00:14, 8 November 2025 (UTC) ‡ National team caps and goals as of 00:14, 8 November 2025 (UTC)

Nuno Miguel Madeira Fernandes Félix (born 16 March 2004) is a Portuguese professional footballer who plays as a defensive midfielder for Primeira Liga club Benfica.

== Club career ==
In 2016, after four seasons with Portimonense, Félix joined Benfica. He signed his first professional contract in September 2020.

== International career ==
Félix has represented Portugal at youth international level.

== Career statistics ==
=== Club ===
As of match played 11 May 2025

Appearances and goals by club, season and competition
Club	Season	League			National cup		League cup		Europe		Other		Total	
Club	Season	Division	Apps	Goals	Apps	Goals	Apps	Goals	Apps	Goals	Apps	Goals	Apps	Goals
Benfica B	2021–22	Liga Portugal 2	3	0	—		—		—		—		3	0
Benfica B	2022–23	Liga Portugal 2	1	0	—		—		—		—		1	0
Benfica B	2023–24	Liga Portugal 2	32	3	—		—		—		—		32	3
Benfica B	2024–25	Liga Portugal 2	25	1	—		—		—		—		25	1
Benfica B	Total		61	4	—		—		—		—		61	4
Benfica	2024–25	Primeira Liga	2	0	1	0	0	0	0	0	0	0	3	0
Career total			63	4	1	0	0	0	0	0	0	0	64	4

== Honours ==
Benfica

- Campeonato Nacional de Juniores: 2021–22
- UEFA Youth League: 2021–22
- Under-20 Intercontinental Cup: 2022
