= Leandro Santos (footballer, born 2005) =

Portuguese footballer

Personal information
- Full name: Leandro Henrique Sousa Santos
- Date of birth: 28 September 2005 (age 21)
- Place of birth: Barreiro, Portugal
- Height: 1.81 m (5 ft 11 in)
- Position: Right-back

Team information
- Current team: Moreirense
- Number: 71

Youth career
- 2013–2017: Fabril
- 2017–2024: Benfica

Senior career*
Years	Team	Apps	(Gls)
2024–2026	Benfica B	29	(3)
2024–2025	Benfica	3	(0)
2026–	Moreirense	9	(0)

International career^{‡}
2024–	Portugal U20	10	(0)
- * Club domestic league appearances and goals as of 25 May 2026 ‡ National team caps and goals as of 14:01, 8 November 2025 (UTC)

Leandro Henrique Sousa Santos (born 28 September 2005) is a Portuguese professional footballer who plays as a right-back for Liga Portugal club Moreirense.

== Club career ==
Santos is a youth product of his local club Fabril, before moving to the youth academy of Benfica in 2017. On 9 October 2019, he signed his first development contract with Benfica. On 21 February 2022, he signed his first professional contract with the club. On 22 March 2024, he extended his contract with Benfica. In the 2024–25 season he was promoted to Benfica B in the Liga Portugal 2, and training with the senior team in November 2024. He made his debut with the senior Benfica side as a substitute in a 7–0 Taça de Portugal win over Estrela da Amadora on 24 November 2024.

On 23 January 2026, Santos moved to Moreirense signing a 4–year contract.

== International career ==
Santos is a youth international for Portugal, and was first called up to a training camp for the Portugal U20s in October 2024.

== Career statistics ==
As of match played 23 January 2026

Appearances and goals by club, season and competition
Club	Season	League			National cup		League cup		Europe		Other		Total	
Club	Season	Division	Apps	Goals	Apps	Goals	Apps	Goals	Apps	Goals	Apps	Goals	Apps	Goals
Benfica B	2024–25	Liga Portugal 2	20	2	—		—		—		—		20	2
Benfica B	2025–26	Liga Portugal 2	9	1	—		—		—		—		9	1
Benfica B	Total		29	3	—		—		—		—		29	3
Benfica	2024–25	Primeira Liga	3	0	3	0	0	0	0	0	0	0	6	0
Moreirense	2025–26	Primeira Liga	0	0	—		—		—		—		0	0
Career total			32	3	3	0	0	0	0	0	0	0	35	3
