= Leandro Santos (footballer, born 1984) =

Brazilian footballer

Personal information
- Full name: Leandro Moreira dos Santos
- Date of birth: 30 June 1984 (age 42)
- Place of birth: Rondonópolis, Brazil
- Height: 1.92 m (6 ft 3 1/2 in)
- Position: Goalkeeper

Team information
- Current team: Treze

Youth career
- 2000–2006: Portuguesa

Senior career*
Years	Team	Apps	(Gls)
2006–2009	Portuguesa	7	(0)
2008	→ Coruripe (loan)	0	(0)
2009	→ Monte Azul (loan)		
2009–2012	São Caetano	14	(0)
2012	→ Monte Azul (loan)	10	(0)
2012	→ Mirassol (loan)	8	(0)
2013	Linense	20	(0)
2013–2014	Bragantino	30	(0)
2014–2015	Penapolense	12	(0)
2015–2016	Oeste	26	(0)
2016–2017	Guarani	61	(0)
2018	Portuguesa	1	(0)
2019	Comercial	15	(0)
2020	Desportivo Brasil	11	(0)
2021	Treze	0	(0)
- * Club domestic league appearances and goals as of 14:25, 1 March 2021 (UTC)

Leandro Moreira dos Santos (born 30 June 1984), is a Brazilian footballer who plays as a goalkeeper for Treze.

== Career ==
Born in Rondonópolis, Leandro Santos joined Portuguesa at the age of sixteen. He made his professional debut in the 2006 Campeonato Brasileiro Série B season opener against São Raimundo-AM on 15 April 2006. During his career with Portuguesa he was loaned to Coruripe and Monte Azul, being one of the highlights of the team who won promotion to the top division of São Paulo state football at the latter.

In July 2009, he joined São Caetano, where he again competed in Série B. In the final year of his contract he had loan spells at Monte Azul for a second time, and Mirassol, where he would represent the club in 2012 Campeonato Brasileiro Série D.

In September 2013, he signed an agreement to play in the 2013 Campeonato Paulista with Linense. He was one of four player signed by Bragantino from Linense in mid-2013, agreeing a one-year deal to play in 2013 Campeonato Brasileiro Série B and 2014 Campeonato Paulista. He stayed with the club for the 2014 Campeonato Brasileiro Série B, but suffered injury and lost his place, signing in June 2014 with Penapolense to play in Série D.

Leandro Santos played 2015 Campeonato Brasileiro Série B and 2016 Campeonato Paulista with Oeste, before signing with Guarani in April 2016. He secured promotion with the club from Série C, and signed up for the 2017 season.

From 2018 to 2020, Leandro Santos played in the lower division of Paulista football, firstly returning to Portuguesa, then with Comercial and Desportivo Brasil.

In January 2021, Leandro Santos signed for Treze.
