= 2024–25 Taça da Liga =

Allianz Cup

Tournament details
- Country: Portugal
- Dates: 29 October 2024 – 11 January 2025
- Teams: 8

Final positions
- Champions: Benfica (8th title)
- Runners-up: Sporting CP

Tournament statistics
- Matches played: 7
- Goals scored: 18 (2.57 per match)
- Attendance: 154,924 (22,132 per match)
- Top goal scorer: Viktor Gyökeres (4 goals)

The 2024–25 Taça da Liga was the eighteenth edition of the Taça da Liga (also known as Allianz Cup for sponsorship reasons), a football league cup competition organised by the Liga Portuguesa de Futebol Profissional and contested exclusively by clubs competing in the two professional divisions of Portuguese football – the top-tier Primeira Liga and the second-tier Liga Portugal 2. This season featured only eight teams in the competition.

== Format ==
As a response to the increasing density of the football calendar, the competition introduced a new format compared to the previous seasons, featuring only eight teams instead of the all the teams from Primeira Liga and Liga Portugal 2. The top six teams from the Primeira Liga and the top two non-reserve teams from the Liga Portugal 2 were paired according to their league positions to play single-leg quarter-final matches:

- 1st place (Primeira Liga) vs. 2nd place (Liga Portugal 2)
- 2nd place (Primeira Liga) vs. 1st place (Liga Portugal 2)
- 3rd place (Primeira Liga) vs. 6th place (Primeira Liga)
- 4th place (Primeira Liga) vs. 5th place (Primeira Liga)

The winners qualified to the final-four tournament, which was played at a neutral venue and comprised two single-leg semi-finals and a final. The final four was played at the Estádio Dr. Magalhães Pessoa, in Leiria.

== Qualified teams ==
Team	Tier	Rank
Sporting CP	Primeira Liga	1st place
Benfica	Primeira Liga	2nd place
Porto	Primeira Liga	3rd place
Braga	Primeira Liga	4th place
Vitória de Guimarães	Primeira Liga	5th place
Moreirense	Primeira Liga	6th place
Santa Clara	Liga Portugal 2	1st place
Nacional	Liga Portugal 2	2nd place

== Quarter-finals ==
In this round, with the best placed teams playing at home.

29 October 2024	Sporting CP	3–1	Nacional	Lisbon
20:15 WET	Hjulmand 53'; Gyökeres 65' (pen.), 70'	Report	Macedo 66'	Stadium: Estádio de Alvalade; Attendance: 32,622; Referee: Hélder Carvalho

30 October 2024	Benfica	3–0	Santa Clara	Lisbon
20:15 WET	Di María 71'; Pavlidis 76', 80'	Report		Stadium: Estádio da Luz; Attendance: 48,639; Referee: Hélder Malheiro

31 October 2024	Braga	2–1	Vitória de Guimarães	Braga
18:45 WET	Niakaté 22'; Bruma 75' (pen.)	Report	Santos 10'	Stadium: Estádio Municipal de Braga; Attendance: 9,663; Referee: Fábio Veríssimo

31 October 2024	Porto	2–0	Moreirense	Aveiro
20:45 WET	Buta 34' (o.g.); Eustáquio 61'	Report		Stadium: Estádio Municipal de Aveiro; Attendance: 3,340; Referee: Gustavo Correia

== Final-four ==
The final-four is played from 7 to 11 January 2025 in Estádio Dr. Magalhães Pessoa, Leiria, and comprised the semi-finals and final of the competition.

=== Bracket ===
Semi-finals
7 January 2025 – Leiria
Sporting CP	1
Porto	0
8 January 2025 – Leiria
Benfica	3
Braga	0

Final
11 January 2025 – Leiria
Sporting CP	1 (6)
Benfica	1 (7)

=== Semi-finals ===
7 January 2025
19:45 WET

Sporting CP	1–0	Porto
Gyökeres 56'	Report

Estádio Dr. Magalhães Pessoa, Leiria
Attendance: 20,007
Referee: António Nobre

8 January 2025
19:45 WET

Benfica	3–0	Braga
Di María 27', 37'; Carreras 28'	Report

Estádio Dr. Magalhães Pessoa, Leiria
Attendance: 19,917
Referee: Cláudio Pereira

=== Final ===
11 January 2025
19:45 WET

Sporting CP	1–1	Benfica
Gyökeres 42' (pen.)	Report	Schjelderup 29'
Penalties
Gyökeres (penalty scored); Hjulmand (penalty scored); Harder (penalty scored); Araújo (penalty scored); Debast (penalty scored); Quenda (penalty scored); Trincão (penalty missed)	6–7	(penalty scored) Di María; (penalty scored) Amdouni; (penalty scored) Otamendi; (penalty scored) Aktürkoğlu; (penalty scored) Sanches; (penalty scored) Barreiro; (penalty scored) Florentino

Estádio Dr. Magalhães Pessoa, Leiria
Attendance: 20,736
Referee: João Pinheiro
