= List of Portuguese football transfers summer 2025 =

This is a list of Portuguese football transfers for the summer of 2025. The summer transfer window will open 1 July and close at midnight on 31 August. Players may be bought before the transfer windows opens, but may only join their new club on 1 July. Only moves involving Primeira Liga clubs are listed. Additionally, players without a club may join a club at any time.

== Transfers ==
Date	Name	Moving from	Moving to	Fee
1 June 2025	(England) Marcus Edwards	Sporting CP	(England) Burnley	Undisclosed
1 June 2025	(Portugal) Dário Essugo	Sporting CP	(England) Chelsea	£18.5m
1 June 2025	(Portugal) Geovany Quenda	Sporting CP	(England) Chelsea	£44m
5 June 2025	(Spain) Gabri Veiga	(Saudi Arabia) Al-Ahli	Porto	Undisclosed
1 July 2025	(Morocco) Alaa Bellaarouch	(France) Strasbourg	Braga	Undisclosed
1 July 2025	(Spain) Fabio Blanco	Marítiomo	Vitória de Guimarães	€1.2m
1 July 2025	(Portugal) Kiko Bondoso	(Israel) Maccabi Tel Aviv	Moreirense	Undisclosed
1 July 2025	(Brazil) Douglas Borel	(Brazil) Bahia	Santa Clara	Free
1 July 2025	(Brazil) Brenner	Alverca	Santa Clara	Free
1 July 2025	(Brazil) Arthur Cabral	Benfica	(Brazil) Botafogo	€12m
1 July 2025	(Cape Verde) Sidny Lopes Cabral	(Germany) Viktoria Köln	Estrela da Amadora	Free
1 July 2025	(France) Oumar Camara	(France) Paris Saint-Germain U19	Vitória de Guimarães	Free
1 July 2025	(Australia) Anthony Carter	Alverca	Santa Clara	Undisclosed
1 July 2025	(Peru) Jesús Castillo	Gil Vicente	(Peru) Universitario de Deportes	Undisclosed
1 July 2025	(Colombia) Juan Diego Castillo	(Colombia) Fortaleza CEIF	Vitória de Guimarães	Undisclosed
1 July 2025	(Angola) Sandro Cruz	Gil Vicente	(Slovakia) Slovan Bratislava	Undisclosed
1 July 2025	(Sweden) Samuel Dahl	(Italy) Roma	Benfica	€9m
1 July 2025	(Mali) Amadou Dante	(Austria) Sturm Graz	Arouca	Undisclosed
1 July 2025	(Angola) Depú	Gil Vicente	(Poland) Radomiak Radom	Undisclosed
1 July 2025	(Argentina) Ángel Di María	Benfica	(Argentina) Rosario Central	Free
1 July 2025	(Spain) Antonio Espigares	(Spain) Villarreal B	Gil Vicente	Undisclosed
1 July 2025	(Portugal) Luís Esteves	Nacional	Gil Vicente	Undisclosed
1 July 2025	(Spain) Roberto Fernández	Braga	(Spain) Espanyol	Undisclosed
1 July 2025	(Portugal) Martim Gustavo	Estoril	Nacional	Undisclosed
1 July 2025	(Brazil) Janderson	Vitória de Guimarães	(Turkey) Göztepe	Undisclosed
1 July 2025	(Spain) Jason	Arouca	(Saudi Arabia) Al-Fayha	Free
1 July 2025	(Czech Republic) David Jurásek	Benfica	(Turkey) Beşiktaş	Loan
1 July 2025	(Brazil) Kazu	Gil Vicente	(Romania) Oțelul Galați	Undisclosed
1 July 2025	(France) Koba Koindredi	Sporting CP	(Switzerland) Basel	Loan
1 July 2025	(Ivory Coast) Ghislain Konan	(Spain) Burgos	Gil Vicente	Free
1 July 2025	(Bosnia and Herzegovina) Vladan Kovačević	Sporting CP	(England) Norwich City	Undisclosed
1 July 2025	(Ukraine) Orest Lebedenko	Vizela	Vitória de Guimarães	Free
1 July 2025	(Portugal) Tiago Leite	Fafe	Alverca	Free
1 July 2025	(Portugal) Leonardo Lelo	Casa Pia	Braga	Free
1 July 2025	(Cape Verde) Vasco Lopes	AVS	(Poland) Radomiak Radom	Free
1 July 2025	(Uruguay) Brian Mansilla	(Uruguay) Peñarol	Arouca	€800k
1 July 2025	(Brazil) João Marcos	Santa Clara	Ararat-Armenia	Undisclosed
1 July 2025	(Portugal) João Mário	Benfica	(Turkey) Beşiktaş	€2m
1 July 2025	(Spain) Álvaro Martínez	(Spain) Cultural Leonesa	Moreirense	Undisclosed
1 July 2025	(Portugal) Jorge Meireles	Porto B	Estrela da Amadora	Undisclosed
1 July 2025	(France) Soualiho Meïté	Benfica	(Greece) PAOK	€1m
1 July 2025	(Portugal) Francisco Meixedo	Estrela da Amadora	Feirense	Undisclosed
1 July 2025	(Serbia) Marko Mitrović	(Serbia) Železničar Pančevo	Vitória de Guimarães	€900k
1 July 2025	(Uruguay) Dylan Nandín	(Uruguay) Racing de Montevideo	Arouca	€1.4m
1 July 2025	(Portugal) Miguel Nóbrega	Rio Ave	Vitória de Guimarães	Free
1 July 2025	(Morocco) Yassin Oukili	(Netherlands) RKC Waalwijk	Casa Pia	Undisclosed
1 July 2025	(Portugal) Pablo	Famalicão	Gil Vicente	Undisclosed
1 July 2025	(Argentina) Nehuén Pérez	(Italy) Udinese	Porto	Undisclosed
1 July 2025	(Cape Verde) Wagner Pina	Estoril	(Turkey) Trabzonspor	€3m
1 July 2025	(Portugal) Diogo Pinto	Sporting CP	Estrela da Amadora	Undisclosed
1 July 2025	(Portugal) Pizzi	(Cyprus) APOEL	Estoril	Undisclosed
1 July 2025	(Serbia) Boris Popović	(Belgium) Cercle Brugge	Arouca	Free
1 July 2025	(Ecuador) Leonardo Realpe	(Brazil) Red Bull Bragantino	Famalicão	Undisclosed
1 July 2025	(Brazil) Reinaldo	Santa Clara	Chaves	Loan
1 July 2025	(Portugal) Filipe Relvas	Vitória de Guimarães	(Greece) AEK Athens	Undisclosed
1 July 2025	(Portugal) João Resende	União de Leiria	Estrela da Amadora	Undisclosed
1 July 2025	(Brazil) Renan Ribeiro	(United States) Hartford Athletic	Estrela da Amadora	Free
1 July 2025	(Portugal) Ricardinho	Santa Clara	(Mexico) Juárez	Free
1 July 2025	(Brazil) Rildo	Santa Clara	(Bulgaria) Levski Sofia	Loan
1 July 2025	(Spain) Rodri	(Spain) Villarreal B	Moreirense	Undisclosed
1 July 2025	(Portugal) Afonso Rodrigues	Famalicão	Tondela	Undisclosed
1 July 2025	(Portugal) Ni Rodrigues	Vitória de Guimarães B	Estrela da Amadora	Free
1 July 2025	(Brazil) Alisson Safira	Santa Clara	(Brazil) Cuiabá	Loan
1 July 2025	(Brazil) Alisson Santos	(Brazil) Vitória	Sporting CP	Undisclosed
1 July 2025	(South Africa) Nkanyiso Shinga	Alverca	(South Africa) Kaizer Chiefs	€200k
1 July 2025	(Brazil) Wendel Silva	Porto	Santa Clara	Undisclosed
1 July 2025	(Brazil) Sorriso	(Brazil) Red Bull Bragantino	Famalicão	Undisclosed
1 July 2025	(Portugal) Ronaldo Tavares	Estrela da Amadora	(Brazil) Athletic Club	Undisclosed
1 July 2025	(Portugal) Sidnei Tavares	Moreirense	(England) Blackburn Rovers	Undisclosed
1 July 2025	(France) Lenny Vallier	(France) EA Guingamp	Nacional	Free
1 July 2025	(Slovakia) Jakub Vinarčík	(Italy) Juventus	Arouca	Undisclosed
1 July 2025	(Poland) Bartłomiej Wdowik	Braga	(Poland) Jagiellonia Białystok	Loan
1 July 2025	(Portugal) António Xavier	Tondela	(Israel) Bnei Yehuda	Free
2 July 2025	(Brazil) João Bravim	Santa Clara	Leiria	Loan
2 July 2025	(Colombia) Gian Cabezas	(Colombia) Deportivo Cali	Alverca	Undisclosed
2 July 2025	(Bulgaria) Atanas Chernev	(Bulgaria) Botev Plovdiv	Estrela da Amadora	Undisclosed
2 July 2025	(Portugal) Francisco Domingues	Benfica B	Moreirense	Undisclosed
2 July 2025	(Portugal) David Grilo	Belenenses	Estrela da Amadora	Undisclosed
2 July 2025	(Serbia) Marko Gudžulić	Estrela da Amadora	Chaves	Undisclosed
2 July 2025	(Nigeria) Isaac James	(France) Lorient	Alverca	Free
2 July 2025	(Brazil) Douglas Nathan	(Brazil) São Caetano	Nacional	Free
2 July 2025	(Tunisia) Motez Nourani	(Turkey) Adana Demirspor	Nacional	Free
2 July 2025	(Belgium) Cédric Nuozzi	(Belgium) Genk	Alverca	Free
2 July 2025	(Portugal) Henrique Pereira	Benfica B	Santa Clara	Undisclosed
2 July 2025	(Brazil) Pablo Ruan	(Brazil) Londrina	Nacional	Undisclosed
2 July 2025	(Brazil) Kevyn Vinícius	(Brazil) Fluminense	Nacional	Undisclosed
3 July 2025	(France) Naïs Djouahra	(Croatia) Rijeka	Arouca	Free
3 July 2025	(Spain) Junior Mendes	(France) EA Guingamp	Alverca	Free
3 July 2025	(Brazil) Deivison Souza	(Brazil) Hope Internacional	Nacional	Undisclosed
3 July 2025	(Brazil) Paulo Vitor	(Russia) Akron Tolyatti	Vitória de Guimarães	Loan
4 July 2025	(Portugal) Rafael Barbosa	(Poland) Radomiak Radom	AVS	Free
4 July 2025	(Ivory Coast) Mario Dorgeles	(Denmark) Nordsjælland	Braga	Undisclosed
4 July 2025	(England) Khayon Edwards	(England) Arsenal	Estoril	Undisclosed
4 July 2025	(Guinea-Bissau) Jefferson Encada	(Egypt) Pharco	Estrela da Amadora	Undisclosed
4 July 2025	(Brazil) Thauan Lara	Alverca	Santa Clara	Undisclosed
4 July 2025	(Paraguay) Alan Núñez	(Paraguay) Cerro Porteño	Nacional	Loan
5 July 2025	(France) Steven Baseya	(France) Strasbourg	Alverca	€400k
5 July 2025	(Spain) Alan Godoy	(Spain) Barcelona	Estrela da Amadora	Loan
5 July 2025	(Angola) Manuel Keliano	Estrela da Amadora	(Russia) Akhmat Grozny	Undisclosed
5 July 2025	(Portugal) André Paulo	Oliveira do Hospital	Alverca	Free
6 July 2025	(Japan) Kanya Fujimoto	Gil Vicente	(England) Birmingham City	Free
6 July 2025	(Brazil) Gustavo Garci	(Brazil) Palmeiras	Famalicão	Undisclosed
6 July 2025	(Georgia (country)) Giorgi Kochorashvili	(Spain) Levante	Sporting CP	Undisclosed
6 July 2025	(Venezuela) Jesús Ramírez	Vitória de Guimarães	Nacional	Undisclosed
7 July 2025	(Portugal) Dani Figueira	Estoril	Gil Vicente	Undisclosed
7 July 2025	(Belgium) Ikker Julian	(Brazil) Azuriz	Alverca	Undisclosed
7 July 2025	(Portugal) Chico Lamba	Arouca	(France) Saint-Étienne	Undisclosed
7 July 2025	(Brazil) Felipe Lima	(Brazil) Flamengo	Alverca	Undisclosed
8 July 2025	(Uruguay) Rodrigo Abascal	Boavista	Vitória de Guimarães	Free
8 July 2025	(Greece) Nikos Athanasiou	(Greece) Olympiacos	Rio Ave	Loan
8 July 2025	(Ivory Coast) Davy Gui	(France) Dijon FCO	Alverca	Free
8 July 2025	(Sweden) Gustaf Lagerbielke	(Scotland) Celtic	Braga	£2.2m
8 July 2025	(Brazil) Lipe	Gil Vicente	Porto B	Undisclosed
8 July 2025	(Portugal) Mamede	Estrela da Amadora	Portimonense	Undisclosed
8 July 2025	(Nigeria) Abraham Marcus	Porto B	Estrela da Amadora	Undisclosed
8 July 2025	(Brazil) Guilherme Neiva	Oliveira do Hospital	AVS	Free
8 July 2025	(France) Kélian Nsona	(Germany) Hertha BSC	Casa Pia	Undisclosed
8 July 2025	(Spain) Arnau Solà	(Spain) Almería	Arouca	Undisclosed
8 July 2025	(Serbia) Mateja Stjepanović	(Serbia) Partizan	Moreirense	Undisclosed
9 July 2025	(France) Longin Bimai	(France) Strasbourg	Estoril	Undisclosed
9 July 2025	(Portugal) Chiquinho	(England) Wolverhampton Wanderers	Alverca	Undisclosed
9 July 2025	(Portugal) João Costa	Estrela da Amadora	Porto	Undisclosed
9 July 2025	(Portugal) Bernardo Lourenço	Beira-Mar	Estoril	Undisclosed
9 July 2025	(Greece) Antonis Papakanellos	(Greece) Olympiacos	Rio Ave	Loan
9 July 2025	(Brazil) Bernardo Schappo	(Brazil) Fortaleza	Estrela da Amadora	Undisclosed
9 July 2025	(Portugal) Gustavo Varela	Benfica	Gil Vicente	Loan
10 July 2025	(Brazil) Josué	(Brazil) Grêmio	Nacional	Undisclosed
10 July 2025	(Sweden) Joe Mendes	Braga	(Turkey) Samsunspor	€1.2m
10 July 2025	(Spain) Tomás Mendes	(Spain) Alavés	Alverca	Loan
10 July 2025	(Brazil) Luan Patrick	(Italy) Hellas Verona	Estrela da Amadora	Undisclosed
10 July 2025	(Croatia) Dominik Prpić	(Croatia) Hajduk Split	Porto	€4.5m
10 July 2025	(Portugal) Ivo Rodrigues	Moreirense	(Poland) Motor Lublin	Undisclosed
11 July 2025	(Cuba) Jorge Aguirre	Gil Vicente	(Greece) Panetolikos	Loan
11 July 2025	(Brazil) Alex Amorim	(Brazil) Fortaleza	Alverca	€310k
11 July 2025	(Brazil) Matheus Dias	(Brazil) Internacional	Nacional	Undisclosed
11 July 2025	(Uruguay) Martín Fernández	(Uruguay) Boston River	Gil Vicente	Loan
11 July 2025	(Portugal) André Gomes	Benfica	Alverca	Loan
11 July 2025	(Portugal) Rodrigo Macedo	Braga	(Netherlands) AZ	Undisclosed
11 July 2025	(Uruguay) Agustín Moreira	(Uruguay) Progreso	Gil Vicente	Loan
11 July 2025	(Spain) Rafa Obrador	(Spain) Real Madrid	Benfica	Undisclosed
11 July 2025	(Brazil) Hevertton Santos	(England) Queens Park Rangers	Gil Vicente	Loan
11 July 2025	(Portugal) Pedro Santos	Benfica	Famalicão	Undisclosed
12 July 2025	(Brazil) Léo Chú	(United States) FC Dallas	Alverca	Undisclosed
12 July 2025	(Brazil) Paulo Victor	Farense	Santa Clara	Undisclosed
13 July 2025	(Angola) Chico Banza	Estrela da Amadora	(Egypt) Zamalek	Undisclosed
13 July 2025	(Turkey) Orkun Kökçü	Benfica	(Turkey) Beşiktaş	Loan
13 July 2025	(Spain) Borja Sainz	(England) Norwich City	Porto	£14.25m
14 July 2025	(Nigeria) Umar Abubakar	(Belgium) Gent	Famalicão	Undisclosed
14 July 2025	(Albania) Adrian Bajrami	Benfica	(Switzerland) Luzern	Loan
14 July 2025	(Spain) Álvaro Carreras	Benfica	(Spain) Real Madrid	€50m
14 July 2025	(Bosnia and Herzegovina) Amar Dedić	(Austria) Red Bull Salzburg	Benfica	Undisclosed
14 July 2025	(Georgia (country)) Nodar Lominadze	(Georgia (country)) Dinamo Tbilisi	Estoril	Undisclosed
14 July 2025	(Brazil) Kaique Pereira	(Brazil) Palmeiras	Nacional	Loan
14 July 2025	(Brazil) Robinho	(Brazil) Volta Redonda	Estrela da Amadora	Undisclosed
15 July 2025	(Brazil) Matheusinho	Santa Clara	(Brazil) Recife	Loan
15 July 2025	(Serbia) Marko Milovanović	(Spain) Almería	Alverca	Loan
16 July 2025	(Spain) Ángel Algobia	(Spain) Levante	AVS	Free
16 July 2025	(Portugal) Bruno Almeida	Santa Clara	Farense	Loan
16 July 2025	(Brazil) Alysson	Santa Clara	Farense	Loan
16 July 2025	(Spain) Iván Barbero	(Spain) Deportivo La Coruña	Arouca	€300k
16 July 2025	(Ivory Coast) Stéphane Diarra	(France) Lorient	Alverca	Free
16 July 2025	(Paraguay) Diego Duarte	(Paraguay) Nacional	AVS	Loan
16 July 2025	(Spain) Xabi Huarte	(Spain) Osasuna	Tondela	Free
16 July 2025	(Brazil) Pedro Lima	(Brazil) Palmeiras	AVS	Undisclosed
16 July 2025	(Brazil) Gabriel Veron	Porto	(Brazil) Juventude	Loan
17 July 2025	(Colombia) Brayan Medina	(Colombia) Deportivo Cali	Tondela	Undisclosed
17 July 2025	(Spain) Gonzalo Calçada	(Spain) Getafe B	Estrela da Amadora	Undisclosed
17 July 2025	(Portugal) Félix Correia	Gil Vicente	(France) Lille	Undisclosed
17 July 2025	(Brazil) Jader	Santa Clara	(Brazil) Cuiabá	Loan
17 July 2025	(Spain) Guillem Molina	(Spain) Ibiza	AVS	Free
17 July 2025	(Brazil) Weverson	Arouca	(Brazil) Fortaleza	Undisclosed
18 July 2025	(Argentina) Enzo Barrenechea	(England) Aston Villa	Benfica	Loan
18 July 2025	(Republic of Ireland) Joe Hodge	(England) Wolverhampton Wanderers	Tondela	Undisclosed
18 July 2025	(Brazil) Samuel Portugal	Porto	(Saudi Arabia) Al-Okhdood	Loan
19 July 2025	(Brazil) Dani Borges	Santa Clara	Leiria	Loan
19 July 2025	(Brazil) Gabriel Moscardo	(France) Paris Saint-Germain	Braga	Loan
19 July 2025	(Brazil) Kaiky Naves	(Brazil) Palmeiras	Alverca	Loan
20 July 2025	(Portugal) Gonçalo Borges	Porto	(Netherlands) Feyenoord	Undisclosed
20 July 2025	(Croatia) Ivan Mandić	(Croatia) Vukovar 1991	Casa Pia	Undisclosed
20 July 2025	(Burkina Faso) Régis N'do	Estrela da Amadora	(Israel) Hapoel Haifa	Undisclosed
21 July 2025	(Costa Rica) Kevin Chamorro	(Costa Rica) Saprissa	Rio Ave	Undisclosed
21 July 2025	(Angola) Lucas João	(Turkey) Ümraniyespor	Nacional	Undisclosed
21 July 2025	(Portugal) Christian Marques	(Switzerland) Yverdon-Sport	Tondela	Free
21 July 2025	(Spain) Assane Ndiaye	(Spain) Cartagena	Estrela da Amadora	Undisclosed
22 July 2025	(Portugal) Francisco Conceição	Porto	(Italy) Juventus	€30.4m
22 July 2025	(France) Hamed Dramé	(Italy) Giugliano	Estrela da Amadora	Undisclosed
22 July 2025	(Portugal) Gonçalo Esteves	(Italy) Udinese	Alverca	Loan
22 July 2025	(Portugal) André Horta	Braga	(Spain) Almería	Loan
22 July 2025	(France) Bastien Meupiyou	(England) Wolverhampton Wanderers	Alverca	Undisclosed
22 July 2025	(Senegal) Mouhamed Lamine N'Diaye	(France) Saint-Étienne B	Alverca	Undisclosed
22 July 2025	(Colombia) Richard Ríos	(Brazil) Palmeiras	Benfica	Undisclosed
22 July 2025	(Portugal) Filipe Soares	(Greece) PAOK	Moreirense	Undisclosed
23 July 2025	(Portugal) Zé Carlos	Vitória de Guimarães	Gil Vicente	Undisclosed
23 July 2025	(Denmark) Victor Froholdt	(Denmark) Copenhagen	Porto	Undisclosed
23 July 2025	(Brazil) Kauan Gomes	Maia Lidador	Alverca	Undisclosed
23 July 2025	(South Korea) Lee Hyun-ju	(Germany) Bayern Munich II	Arouca	€1.5m
23 July 2025	(Brazil) Otávio	Porto	(France) Paris	€17m
23 July 2025	(Colombia) Juan Rodríguez	(Colombia) L.D.U. Quito	Tondela	Loan
23 July 2025	(Brazil) Renan Santana	(Brazil) Atlético Mineiro U20	Famalicão	Undisclosed
23 July 2025	(Mauritania) Abderrahmane Soumare	(Mauritania) Nouakchott Kings	Alverca	Undisclosed
24 July 2025	(Portugal) Alberto Costa	(Italy) Juventus	Porto	€15m
24 July 2025	(South Africa) Kobamelo Kodisang	(South Africa) Mamelodi Sundowns	AVS	Loan
24 July 2025	(Portugal) João Mário	Porto	(Italy) Juventus	€11m
24 July 2025	(Colombia) Yefrei Rodríguez	(Colombia) Internacional F.C. de Palmira	Tondela	Loan
24 July 2025	(Denmark) Casper Tengstedt	Benfica	(Netherlands) Feyenoord	Undisclosed
24 July 2025	(Slovenia) Martin Turk	(Poland) Ruch Chorzów	Estoril	Undisclosed
25 July 2025	(Switzerland) Roméo Beney	(Switzerland) Basel	Famalião	Undisclosed
25 July 2025	(Netherlands) Ruben Kluivert	Casa Pia	(France) Lyon	Undisclosed
25 July 2025	(Brazil) Igor Liziero	(Brazil) São Paulo	Moreirense	Undisclosed
25 July 2025	(Paraguay) Daniel Rivas	(Paraguay) Cerro Porteño	AVS	Undisclosed
25 July 2025	(Spain) Pau Víctor	(Spain) Barcelona	Braga	Undisclosed
25 July 2025	(Portugal) João Virgínia	(England) Everton	Sporting CP	Free
25 July 2025	(Mozambique) Witi	(United Arab Emirates) Al Orooba	Moreirense	Undisclosed
26 July 2025	(Spain) Mateo Flores	(Spain) Real Betis	Arouca	Loan
26 July 2025	(Sweden) Viktor Gyökeres	Sporting CP	(England) Arsenal	€63.5m
26 July 2025	(Finland) Otso Liimatta	Famalicão	(Sweden) IFK Värnamo	Loan
26 July 2025	(Brazil) Elias Manoel	(Brazil) Botafogo	Santa Clara	Loan
27 July 2025	(Uruguay) Franco Israel	Sporting CP	(Italy) Torino	Undisclosed
28 July 2025	(Poland) Jan Bednarek	(England) Southampton	Porto	Undisclosed
28 July 2025	(Brazil) Kaique Rocha	(Brazil) Internacional	Casa Pia	€250k
28 July 2025	(Romania) Ianis Stoica	(Romania) Hermannstadt	Estrela da Amadora	€1.3m
28 July 2025	(Colombia) Luis Suárez	(Spain) Almería	Sporting CP	Undisclosed
28 July 2025	(Brazil) Yarlen	(Brazil) Botafogo	Tondela	Loan
29 July 2025	(Brazil) Patrick de Paula	(Brazil) Botafogo	Estoril	Loan
30 July 2025	(Portugal) Martim Neto	Benfica	(Spain) Elche	Undisclosed
30 July 2025	(Colombia) Seba Pérez	Boavista	Casa Pia	Free
30 July 2025	(Portugal) Joel Silva	Boavista	Nacional	Undisclosed
31 July 2025	(Portugal) Ferro	Estrela da Amadora	Estoril	Undisclosed
31 July 2025	(Portugal) João Gonçalves	Boavista	AVS	Undisclosed
31 July 2025	(Croatia) Franjo Ivanović	(Belgium) Union SG	Benfica	Undisclosed
31 July 2025	(Brazil) Rafael Venâncio	(Brazil) Corinthians	Famalicão	Free
31 July 2025	(Comoros) Rémy Vita	(Netherlands) Fortuna Sittard	Tondela	Undisclosed
1 August 2025	(Spain) Diego Collado	Gil Vicente	(Spain) Cultural Leonesa	Undisclosed
1 August 2025	(Brazil) Michel Costa	Estoril	Felgueiras	Undisclosed
1 August 2025	(Spain) Jordi Escobar	(Spain) Celta Fortuna	AVS	Undisclosed
1 August 2025	(France) Manga Foe-Ondoa	Estoril	Oliveirense	Loan
1 August 2025	(Georgia (country)) Jorge Karseladze	Rio Ave	Académica de Coimbra	Loan
1 August 2025	(Spain) Marcos Peña	(Spain) Almería	Famalicão	Loan
1 August 2025	(Spain) Ismael Sierra	Estoril	(Spain) Villarreal B	Loan
2 August 2025	(Ghana) Sabit Abdulai	(Brazil) Botafogo-SP	Alverca	Undisclosed
2 August 2025	(Brazil) Sandro Lima	(Turkey) Pendikspor	Alverca	Undisclosed
3 August 2025	(Netherlands) Luuk de Jong	(Netherlands) PSV	Porto	Free
3 August 2025	(Bulgaria) Andrian Kraev	Casa Pia	(Israel) Hapoel Tel Aviv	Undisclosed
3 August 2025	(Serbia) Mirko Topić	Famalicão	(England) Norwich City	Undisclosed
4 August 2025	(Senegal) Alioune Ndoye	(Latvia) Valmiera	Vitória de Guimarães	Undisclosed
4 August 2025	(France) Baptiste Roux	AVS	(Serbia) TSC	Undisclosed
4 August 2025	(Senegal) Djibril Soumaré	Braga	(England) Sheffield United	Loan
5 August 2025	(Senegal) Sidi Bane	(France) Lens	AVS	Undisclosed
5 August 2025	(England) Jimi Gower	(England) Arsenal	Moreirense	Free
5 August 2025	(Portugal) Rodrigo Mendes	(Italy) Torino	Santa Clara	Undisclosed
5 August 2025	(Spain) Israel Salazar	Estoril	(Spain) Eldense	Loan
5 August 2025	(Morocco) Nabil Touaizi	(Spain) Albacete	Alverca	Free
6 August 2025	(Greece) Georgios Vagiannidis	(Greece) Panathinaikos	Sporting CP	€12.5m
7 August 2025	(Spain) Sergi Gómez	(Spain) Espanyol	Alverca	Free
7 August 2025	(Portugal) Ricardo Mangas	(Russia) Spartak Moscow	Sporting CP	Undisclosed
7 August 2025	(Spain) Adrián Marín	Braga	(United States) Orlando City	Undisclosed
7 August 2025	(Brazil) David Sousa	(Belgium) RWDM Brussels	Casa Pia	Free
8 August 2025	(Portugal) Tiago Morais	(France) Lille	Casa Pia	Loan
8 August 2025	(Portugal) Fran Pereira	Estoril	Académica de Coimbra	Loan
9 August 2025	(Spain) Marc Gual	(Poland) Legia Warsaw	Rio Ave	Undisclosed
9 August 2025	(Uruguay) Kevin Prieto	(Uruguay) Defensor Sporting	Casa Pia	€170k
10 August 2025	(Colombia) John Mercado	AVS	(Czech Republic) Sparta Prague	Undisclosed
11 August 2025	(Portugal) Diogo Monteiro	(England) Leeds United	Arouca	Undisclosed
11 August 2025	(Spain) Ricard Sánchez	(Spain) Granada	Estoril	Free
12 August 2025	(Israel) Or Israelov	(Israel) Hapoel Tel Aviv	Estoril	Loan
12 August 2025	(Greece) Georgios Liavas	(Greece) Panetolikos	Rio Ave	Undisclosed
12 August 2025	(Senegal) Mamadou Loum	Arouca	(Spain) Sporting Gijón	Undisclosed
13 August 2025	(Portugal) Francisco Chissumba	Braga	Alverca	Loan
13 August 2025	(Portugal) André Franco	Porto	(United States) Chicago Fire	Loan
13 August 2025	(Uruguay) Thiago Helguera	Braga	(Spain) Mirandés	Loan
13 August 2025	(Honduras) Julián Martínez	(Honduras) Olimpia	Alverca	Undisclosed
13 August 2025	(Brazil) Ryan	(Brazil) Bahia	Estrela da Amadora	Undisclosed
14 August 2025	(Egypt) Omar Fayed	(Turkey) Fenerbahçe	Arouca	Loan
14 August 2025	(Mauritania) Oumar Ngom	(France) Pau	Estrela da Amadora	Free
15 August 2025	(Portugal) Henrique Arreiol	Sporting CP	(Poland) Legia Warsaw	Undisclosed
15 August 2025	(Croatia) Toni Borevković	Vitória de Guimarães	(Turkey) Samsunspor	Undisclosed
15 August 2025	(Portugal) Rodrigo Ramos	Estoril	Ararat-Armenia	Undisclosed
15 August 2025	(Croatia) Dario Špikić	(Croatia) Dinamo Zagreb	Rio Ave	Undisclosed
17 August 2025	(Cameroon) Danny Namaso	Porto	(France) Auxerre	Loan
19 August 2025	(Portugal) Ivan Cavaleiro	(Poland) Stal Mielec	Tondela	Free
19 August 2025	(Portugal) Diogo Spencer	Benfica B	AVS	Loan
20 August 2025	(Senegal) Lamine Beye	(Senegal) AJEL de Rufisque	Famalicão	Undisclosed
20 August 2025	(Brazil) Mateus	(Brazil) Palmeiras	Alverca	Loan
21 August 2025	(Spain) Lucas Cañizares	Farense	Tondela	Undisclosed
21 August 2025	(Brazil) Murilo Costa	(Japan) Kyoto Sanga	Gil Vicente	Free
21 August 2025	(Senegal) Pape Fuhrer	(Serbia) Partizan	Estrela da Amadora	Undisclosed
21 August 2025	(Portugal) Bruno Lourenço	(Turkey) Amedspor	AVS	Undisclosed
21 August 2025	(Brazil) Pablo Roberto	Casa Pia	(Brazil) Fortaleza	Undisclosed
22 August 2025	(Portugal) Romário Baró	Porto	(Poland) Radomiak Radom	Undisclosed
22 August 2025	(France) Kelian Baruti	(France) Rennes B	Estoril	Undisclosed
22 August 2025	(Spain) Iván Jaime	Porto	(United States) CF Montréal	Loan
25 August 2025	(Spain) Raúl Blanco	Casa Pia	(Spain) Alcorcón	Loan
25 August 2025	(Portugal) Diogo Brasido	Estoril	(Poland) Polonia Warsaw	Loan
25 August 2025	(Portugal) Diogo Travassos	Sporting CP	Moreirense	Loan
26 August 2025	(Portugal) Bruno Varela	Vitória de Guimarães	(Saudi Arabia) Al-Hazem	Undisclosed
27 August 2025	(Brazil) Daniel Júnior	(Brazil) Vitória	Nacional	Undisclosed
27 August 2025	(Brazil) Rafael Lobato	(Brazil) Botafogo	Rio Ave	Undisclosed
27 August 2025	(Ivory Coast) Balla Sangaré	AVS	Farense	Undisclosed
27 August 2025	(Portugal) Luís Semedo	(England) Sunderland	Moreirense	Loan
27 August 2025	(Romania) Tony Strata	(France) Ajaccio	Vitória de Guimarães	Free
27 August 2025	(Portugal) Tomané	Farense	AVS	Undisclosed
28 August 2025	(France) Antoine Joujou	(Italy) Parma	Famalicão	Loan
28 August 2025	(Brazil) Lincoln	(Turkey) Fenerbahçe	Alverca	Undisclosed
28 August 2025	(Dominican Republic) Pablo Rosario	(France) Nice	Porto	Undisclosed
29 August 2025	(Brazil) Eduardo Ageu	Santa Clara	(Scotland) Hearts	Undisclosed
29 August 2025	(Portugal) Abdu Conté	(France) Troyes	Casa Pia	Undisclosed
30 August 2025	(Portugal) Joelson Fernandes	(Turkey) Hatayspor	Gil Vicente	Undisclosed
30 August 2025	(Lithuania) Romualdas Jansonas	(Lithuania) Kauno Žalgiris	Arouca	Undisclosed
31 August 2025	(Netherlands) Espen van Ee	(Netherlands) Heerenveen	Arouca	Undisclosed
1 September 2025	(Puerto Rico) Leandro Antonetti	(Spain) Sevilla	Estrela da Amadora	Undisclosed
1 September 2025	(Croatia) Roko Baturina	Gil Vicente	(Denmark) AC Horsens	Loan
1 September 2025	(Portugal) José Bica	Vitória de Guimarães	Leixões	Undisclosed
1 September 2025	(Spain) Adrián Butzke	Vitória de Guimarães	Marítimo	Undisclosed
1 September 2025	(Portugal) Fábio Cardoso	Porto	(Spain) Sevilla	Undisclosed
1 September 2025	(Germany) Eric da Silva Moreira	(England) Nottingham Forest	Rio Ave	Loan
1 September 2025	(Brazil) Figueiredo	(Brazil) Vasco da Gama	Alverca	Undisclosed
1 September 2025	(Tunisia) Ismaël Gharbi	Braga	(Germany) FC Augsburg	Loan
1 September 2025	(Portugal) Luís Gomes	Sporting CP B	Estoril	Undisclosed
1 September 2025	(Greece) Fotis Ioannidis	(Greece) Panathinaikos	Sporting CP	€22m
1 September 2025	(Poland) Jakub Kiwior	(England) Arsenal	Porto	Loan
1 September 2025	(Cape Verde) Dailon Livramento	(Italy) Hellas Verona	Casa Pia	Loan
1 September 2025	(Portugal) Rony Lopes	(Turkey) Alanyaspor	Tondela	Undisclosed
1 September 2025	(Portugal) Florentino Luís	Benfica	(England) Burnley	Loan
1 September 2025	(Belgium) Dodi Lukébakio	(Spain) Sevilla	Benfica	Undisclosed
1 September 2025	(Spain) Junior Mendes	Alverca	Leiria	Loan
1 September 2025	(Canada) Dieu-Merci Michel	Vitória de Guimarães	Leiria	Loan
1 September 2025	(Belarus) Vladislav Morozov	Arouca	(Denmark) Kolding IF	Loan
1 September 2025	(Spain) Raúl Parra	Estoril	(Malaysia) Johor Darul Ta'zim	Undisclosed
1 September 2025	(Spain) Alfonso Pastor	(Spain) Levante	Rio Ave	Free
1 September 2025	(Spain) Gonzalo Pastor	(Spain) Castellón	Famalicão	Undisclosed
1 September 2025	(Portugal) Zé Pedro	Porto	(Italy) Cagliari	Undisclosed
1 September 2025	(Colombia) Óscar Perea	(France) Strasbourg	AVS	Loan
1 September 2025	(Portugal) Henrique Pereira	Santa Clara	Chaves	Loan
1 September 2025	(Portugal) Miguel Pires	Santa Clara	União de Leiria	Loan
1 September 2025	(England) Omar Richards	(England) Nottingham Forest	Rio Ave	Loan
1 September 2025	(Curaçao) Xander Severina	(Israel) Maccabi Haifa	Casa Pia	Loan
1 September 2025	(United States) Jordan Siebatcheu	(France) Reims	Tondela	Loan
1 September 2025	(Brazil) Edney Silva	Santa Clara	Portimonense	Loan
1 September 2025	(Portugal) Vasco Sousa	Porto	Moreirense	Loan
1 September 2025	(Belgium) Antef Tsoungui	(Netherlands) Feyenoord	Estoril	Undisclosed
1 September 2025	(Brazil) Paulo Vitor	(Russia) Akron Tolyatti	AVS	Loan
2 September 2025	(Portugal) Tomás Händel	Vitória de Guimarães	(Serbia) Red Star Belgrade	€3.1m
2 September 2025	(Brazil) Luquinhas	(Brazil) Fortaleza	Santa Clara	Undisclosed
2 September 2025	(Spain) Jordi Mboula	Gil Vicente	(Spain) Cultural Leonesa	Free
2 September 2025	(Hungary) Tamás Nikitscher	(Spain) Real Valladolid	Rio Ave	Undisclosed
2 September 2025	(Albania) Anxhelo Sina	Rio Ave	(Greece) PAS Giannina	Loan
2 September 2025	(Brazil) Talles Wander	AVS	Sanjoanense	Loan
3 September 2025	(Portugal) Tiago Silva	Vitória de Guimarães	(Qatar) Al-Rayyan	Free
5 September 2025	(Portugal) Hugo Félix	Benfica B	Tondela	Free
5 September 2025	(Portugal) Roger Fernandes	Braga	(Saudi Arabia) Al-Ittihad	€34.5m
8 September 2025	(Czech Republic) Jakub Brabec	(Greece) Aris	Rio Ave	Free
8 September 2025	(Portugal) Fábio Ronaldo	Estrela da Amadora	(Poland) Motor Lublin	Undisclosed
11 September 2025	(Angola) Miro	Tondela	(Russia) Dynamo Makhachkala	Undisclosed
12 September 2025	(Brazil) Robson Bambu	Braga	(Mexico) Atlético San Luis	€400k
15 September 2025	(Cyprus) Georgios Okkas	Rio Ave	(Greece) Panionios	Loan
18 September 2025	(France) Yann Karamoh	(Italy) Torino	Porto	Free
22 September 2025	(Democratic Republic of the Congo) Simon Banza	Braga	(United Arab Emirates) Al Jazira	€9.5m
22 September 2025	(Portugal) Nuno Santos	Vitória de Guimarães	(South Africa) Mamelodi Sundowns	Undisclosed
24 September 2025	(Brazil) Gustavo Assunção	Free Agent	AVS	Free
