= 2025–26 F.C. Alverca season =

F.C. Alverca
2025-26 season
- President: Fernando Orge
- Manager: Custódio
- Stadium: Estádio do FC Alverca
- Liga Portugal: 11th
- Taça de Portugal: TBD
- Taça da Liga: Quarter-finals
- Top goalscorer: League: Marko Milovanović (2); All: Marko Milovanović (2)
- Highest home attendance: 6,532 vs Benfica
- Lowest home attendance: 2,776 vs Braga
- Biggest win: Alverca 1–0 Tondela
- Biggest defeat: Alverca 0–3 Braga
Home colours	Away colours

The 2025–26 season is Futebol Clube de Alverca's first season in Liga Portugal, the top division, since 2004, and the club’s eighty-seventh season since its founding. Alverca will participate in the Taça de Portugal and the Taça da Liga as well.

== Squad ==
No.	Name	Position	Nationality	Age	Joined
13	André Gomes	GK	Portugal	21	
	Matheus Mendes	GK	Brazil	27	
14	Steven Baseya	DF	France	21	
4	Kaiky Naves	DF	Brazil	24	
33	Bastien Meupiyou	DF	France	20	
	Kauan	DF	Brazil	21	
	Sergi Gómez	DF	Spain	34	
	Julián Martínez	DF	Honduras	22	
	Francisco Chissumba	DF	Portugal	21	
22	Gonçalo Esteves	MF	Portugal	22	
8	Alex Amorim	MF	Brazil	21	
16	Tomás Mendes	MF	Spain	21	
12	Isaac James	MF	Nigeria	22	
18	Lincoln	MF	Brazil	27	
	Abderrahmane Soumare	MF	Mauritania	19	
	Figueiredo	MF	Brazil	25	
21	Sabit Abdulai	MF	Ghana	27	
25	Stéphane Diarra	MF	Ivory Coast	27	
11	Cédric Nuozzi	FW	Belgium	20	
9	Marko Milovanović	FW	Serbia	23	
10	Chiquinho	FW	Portugal	26	
91	Sandro Lima	FW	Brazil	35	
2	Nabil Touaizi	FW	Morocco	25	
19	Tiago Leite	FW	Brazil	26	

=== Transfers In ===
Pos.	Player	Transferred from	Fee	Date	Source
FW	(Belgium) Cédric Nuozzi	(Belgium) Jong Genk	Undisclosed	2 July 2025	
MF	(Nigeria) Isaac James	(France) Lorient	Free	2 July 2025	
FW	(Spain) Junior Armando Mendes	(France) Guingamp	Free	4 July 2025	
DF	(France) Steven Baseya	(Brazil) RC Strasbourg	Undisclosed	5 July 2025	
MF	(Portugal) Chiquinho	(England) Wolverhampton Wanderers	Free	9 July 2025	
MF	(Spain) Tomás Mendes	(Spain) Alavés	Loan	10 July 2025	
GK	(Portugal) André Gomes	(Portugal) Benfica B	Loan	11 July 2025	
MF	(Brazil) Alex Amorim	(Brazil) Fortaleza U20	Undisclosed	11 July 2025	
DF	(Brazil) Kaiky Naves	(Brazil) Palmeiras	Loan	19 July 2025	
DF	(France) Bastien Meupiyou	(England) Wolverhampton Wanderers	Undisclosed	21 July 2025	
DF	(Brazil) Kauan	(Portugal) Maia Lidador	Free	23 July 2025	
MF	(Mauritania) Abderrahmane Soumare	(Mauritania) Academie de Football Nouakchott	Free	23 July 2025	
MF	(Ghana) Sabit Abdulai	(Brazil) Botafogo-SP	Undisclosed	2 August 2025	
FW	(Brazil) Sandro Lima	(Brazil) Atlético Clube Goianiense	Undisclosed	2 August 2025	
FW	(Morocco) Nabil Touaizi	(Spain) Albacete	Free	5 August 2025	
DF	(Spain) Sergi Gómez	(Spain) Espanyol	Free	7 August 2025	
DF	(Honduras) Julián Martínez	(Honduras) Olimpia	Undisclosed	13 August 2025	
DF	(Portugal) Francisco Chissumba	(Portugal) Braga	Loan	13 August 2025	
GK	(Brazil) Matheus Mendes	(Brazil) Atlético Mineiro	Undisclosed	20 August 2025	
MF	(Brazil) Lincoln	(Turkey) Fenerbahçe	Undisclosed	28 August 2025	
MF	(Brazil) Figueiredo	(Brazil) Vasco da Gama	Undisclosed	1 September 2025	

=== Transfers Out ===
Pos.	Player	Transferred to	Fee	Date	Source
FW	(Spain) Junior Armando Mendes	(Portugal) União de Leiria	Loan	1 September 2025	
GK	(Brazil) Cristian	(Brazil) Santa Clara	Undisclosed	1 September 2025	

== Friendlies ==
19 July 2025	Estoril	1–2	Alverca
13:00	Begraoui		Tiago Leite

23 July 2025	Alverca	2–0	Belenenses
13:00	Milovanović; Naves

26 July 2025	Alverca	1–0	Leixões	Vizela
10:00	Milovanović

26 July 2025	Alverca	1–0	Braga B

30 July 2025	Alverca	0–0	Fafe

2 August 2025	Casa Pia	3–2	Alverca

== Competitions ==
=== Overall record ===
Competition	First match	Last match	Starting round	Record							
Competition	First match	Last match	Starting round	Pld	W	D	L	GF	GA	GD	Win %
Liga Portugal	10 August 2025	17 May 2026	Matchday 1	5	1	1	3	5	9	−4	20.00
Taça de Portugal				0	0	0	0	0	0	+0	—
Taça da Liga	29 October 2025		Quarter-finals	0	0	0	0	0	0	+0	—
Total				5	1	1	3	5	9	−4	20.00

Source: Competitions

=== Liga Portugal ===
==== League table ====
Pos	Team	Pld	W	D	L	GF	GA	GD	Pts
9	Vitória de Guimarães	34	12	6	16	39	51	−12	42 (Note: Head-to-head points: Arouca 4, Vitória de Guimarães 1.)
10	Estoril Praia	34	10	9	15	54	57	−3	39 (Note: Head-to-head points: Estoril Praia 4, Alverca 1.)
11	Alverca	34	10	9	15	35	52	−17	39
12	Rio Ave	34	8	12	14	35	57	−22	36 (Note: Head-to-head points: Rio Ave 4, Santa Clara 1.)
13	Santa Clara	34	9	9	16	32	41	−9	36

Source: Liga Portugal
Rules for classification: 1) Points; 2) Head-to-head points; 3) Head-to-head goal difference; 4) Goal difference; 5) Matches won; 6) Goals scored; 7) Play-off.

==== Results summary ====
Overall								Home						Away					
Pld	W	D	L	GF	GA	GD	Pts	W	D	L	GF	GA	GD	W	D	L	GF	GA	GD
5	1	1	3	5	9	−4	4	1	0	2	2	5	−3	0	1	1	3	4	−1

Last updated: 12 September 2025.

==== Results by round ====
Round	1	2	3	4	5	6
Ground	A	H	A	H	H	A
Result	L	L	D	L	W	
Position	12	16	15	17		

Updated to match(es) played on 12 September 2025. Source:
A = Away; H = Home; W = Win; D = Draw; L = Loss

==== Matches ====
10 August 2025 1	Moreirense	2–1	Alverca	Moreira de Cónegos
20:30 UTC+1	Guilherme 27'; Pinto (yellow card) 43'; Domingues (yellow card) 52'; Marcelo (yellow card) 70'; Yan Maranhão 90+5'		T. Mendes (yellow card) 29'; Milovanović 44' (pen.)	Stadium: Parque de Jogos Comendador Joaquim de Almeida Freitas; Attendance: 2,550; Referee: Hélder Malheiro

17 August 2025 2	Alverca	0–3	Braga	Alverca do Ribatejo
18:00			Diego Rodrigues 12'; Horta 14'; El Ouazzani 36' (pen.)	Stadium: Estádio do FC Alverca; Attendance: 2,776; Referee: Miguel Nogueira

25 August 2025 3	Estrela da Amadora	2–2	Alverca	Amadora
20:15	João Gastão (yellow card) 16'; Luan Patrick (yellow card) 21'; Fábio Ronaldo 45+6'; Paulo Moreira (red card) 47'; Kikas (penalty missed) 59'; S. Cabral 63'; Robinho (yellow card) 75'; J. Cabral (yellow card) 86'		Kaiky Naves (yellow card) 23' (yellow-red card) 62'; Nuozzi 37'; Milovanović (yellow card) 44', (goal) 45+3'; Gómez (yellow card) 67'; Chiquinho (yellow card) 68'	Stadium: Estádio José Gomes; Attendance: 3,411; Referee: Ricardo Baixinho

31 August 2025 4	Alverca	1–2	Benfica	Alverca do Ribatejo
18:00	James (yellow card) 29'; Abdulai (yellow card) 60'; Lincoln (yellow card) 81'; Touaizi (yellow card) 81'; Gui 85'		Schjelderup 5'; Dedić (yellow card) 18' (yellow-red card) 70', (goal) 44'; Ríos (yellow card) 46'; Otamendi (yellow card) 59'; Soares (yellow card) 88'; Barrenechea (yellow card) 89'	Stadium: Estádio do FC Alverca; Attendance: 6,532; Referee: José Bessa

12 September 2025 5	Alverca	1–0	Tondela	Alverca do Ribatejo
20:15 UTC+1	Lincoln 44'; Meupiyou (yellow card) 51'		Tiago Manso (penalty missed) 43'; Bebeto (yellow card) 56'; Maranhão (yellow card) 82'	Stadium: Estádio do FC Alverca; Attendance: 2,037; Referee: Luís Filipe

20 September 2025 6	Santa Clara	v	Alverca	Ponta Delgada
14:30 UTC+0				Stadium: Estádio de São Miguel

=== Taça da Liga ===
29 October 2025 Quarter-finals	Sporting CP	v	Alverca	Lisbon
