= Robinho (disambiguation) =

Robinho (Robson de Souza, born 1984) is a Brazilian footballer who plays as a striker.

Robinho may also refer to:

- Robinho (footballer, born 1977) (Robson Pereira de Andrade), Brazilian footballer who plays as a defender
- Robinho (futsal player) (born 1983) (Edelson Robson dos Santos), Russian futsal player
- Robinho (footballer, born September 1987) (Robert Brito Luciano), Brazilian footballer who plays as a striker
- Robinho (footballer, born November 1987) (Róbson Michael Signorini), Brazilian footballer who plays as a striker
- Robinho (footballer, born 1988) (Robson Chaves Santana), Brazilian football attacking midfielder
- Robinho (footballer, born January 1995) (Francisco Wellington Barbosa de Lisboa), Brazilian footballer who plays as a winger
- Robinho (footballer, born July 1995) (Robson Azevedo da Silva), Brazilian footballer who plays as a winger
- Robinho (footballer, born 1997) (Ricardo Alexandre Ribeiro Vieira), Portuguese footballer who plays as a midfielder
- Robinho (footballer, born 1998) (Robson José Brilhante Martins), Brazilian footballer who plays as a forward
- Robinho (footballer, born 2002) (Robson Lucas Oliveira Botelho), Brazilian footballer who plays as a midfielder
