= 2022–23 S.L. Benfica B season =

S.L. Benfica B
2022–23 season
- President: Rui Costa
- Head coach: Luís Castro
- Stadium: Benfica Campus
- Liga Portugal 2: 15th
Home colours	Away colours	Third colours

The 2022–23 Sport Lisboa e Benfica "B" season was the team's 18th season in existence and their 10th consecutive one in the second division of Portuguese football. The season covered the period from 1 July 2022 to 30 June 2023.

== Players ==
=== Current squad ===
As of 12 September 2022

Note: Flags indicate national team as defined under FIFA eligibility rules; some limited exceptions apply. Players may hold more than one non-FIFA nationality.

No.	Pos.	Nation	Player
18	FW	BRA	Rodrigo Pinho
24	GK	POR	Samuel Soares
44	DF	ALB	Adrian Bajrami
45	GK	JPN	Leo Kokubo
46	FW	POR	Gerson Sousa
51	FW	POR	João Resende
52	DF	POR	Henrique Pereira
53	DF	POR	Ricardo Teixeira
54	MF	POR	Diogo Capitão (captain)
55	MF	POR	Paulo Bernardo
62	DF	FRA	Lenny Lacroix
65	DF	POR	Rafael Rodrigues
66	DF	POR	António Silva
70	MF	POR	Filipe Cruz

No.	Pos.	Nation	Player
71	DF	POR	João Tomé
73	MF	ITA	Cher Ndour
74	MF	SLO	Žan Jevšenak
76	MF	POR	Martim Neto
78	DF	POR	Francisco "Kiko" Domingues
79	MF	POR	Diogo Nascimento
80	MF	POR	Pedro Santos
81	MF	POR	Tomás Azevedo
87	MF	POR	João Neves
89	FW	BRA	João Neto
90	FW	POR	Luís Semedo
92	GK	POR	Pedro Souza
96	MF	POR	Diego Moreira

=== Out on loan ===
Note: Flags indicate national team as defined under FIFA eligibility rules; some limited exceptions apply. Players may hold more than one non-FIFA nationality.

No.	Pos.	Nation	Player
—	DF	ARG	Germán Conti (at América Mineiro until 31 December 2022)
—	DF	POR	João Ferreira (at Rio Ave until 30 June 2023)
—	MF	MNE	Ilija Vukotić (at Boavista until 30 June 2023)
—	MF	POR	Rafael Brito (at Marítimo until 30 June 2023)
—	MF	POR	Tiago Dantas (at PAOK until 30 June 2023)
—	FW	POR	Tiago Gouveia (at Estoril until 30 June 2023)

== Pre-season and friendlies ==
Win Draw Loss Fixtures

== Competitions ==
=== Overall record ===
Competition	First match	Last match	Starting round	Record							
Competition	First match	Last match	Starting round	Pld	W	D	L	GF	GA	GD	Win %
Liga Portugal 2	6 August 2022	27 May 2023	Matchday 1	34	10	8	16	0	0	+0	29.41
Total				34	10	8	16	0	0	+0	29.41

Source: Soccerway

=== Liga Portugal 2 ===
==== League table ====
Pos	Team	Pld	W	D	L	GF	GA	GD	Pts	Promotion or relegation
12	Penafiel	34	9	12	13	36	47	−11	39 (Note: Penafiel are ahead of Nacional on head-to-head points: Penafiel 3–0 Nacional, Nacional 1–1 Pennafiel.)	
13	Nacional	34	10	9	15	35	46	−11	39	
14	Benfica B (I)	34	10	8	16	52	58	−6	38 (Note: Benfica B are ahead of Leixões on head-to-head points: Benfica B 2–1 Leixões, Leixões 1–1 Benfica B. Leixões were deducted 1 point for financial irregularities.)	
15	Leixões	34	10	9	15	38	49	−11	38	
16	B-SAD (R)	34	9	8	17	41	59	−18	35	Qualification to Relegation play-offs

Updated to match(es) played on 28 May 2023. Source: Liga Portugal 2
Rules for classification: 1) Points; 2) Head-to-head points; 3) Head-to-head goal difference; 4) Head-to-head away goals scored; 5) Goal difference; 6) Matches won; 7) Goals scored; 8) Play-off.
(I) Ineligible for promotion; (R) Relegated

==== Results summary ====
Overall								Home						Away					
Pld	W	D	L	GF	GA	GD	Pts	W	D	L	GF	GA	GD	W	D	L	GF	GA	GD
34	10	8	16	52	58	−6	38	6	3	8	27	25	+2	4	5	8	25	33	−8

Source: Liga Portugal

==== Results by round ====
Round	1	2	3	4	5	6	7	8	9	10	11	12	13	14	15	16	17	18	19	20	21	22	23	24	25	26	27	28	29	30	31	32	33	34
Ground	H	A	H	A	H	A	H	A	H	A	H	A	H	A	H	A	H	A	H	A	H	A	H	A	H	A	H	A	H	A	H	A	H	A
Result	D	D	L	D	W	L	W	D	W	W	W	W	L	L	L	L	D	L	W	L	L	D	L	L	W	D	L	L	D	W	L	W	L	L
Position																																		

Source: Liga Portugal
A = Away; H = Home; W = Win; D = Draw; L = Loss

==== Matches ====
The league fixtures were announced on 5 July 2022.

19 March 2023 25	Benfica B	2–0	Oliveirense

1 April 2023 26	Mafra	1–1	Benfica B

8 April 2023 27	Benfica B	0–1	B-SAD

16 April 2023 28	Moreirense	7–4	Benfica B

24 April 2023 29	Benfica B	0–0	Trofense

30 April 2023 30	Penafiel	0–3	Benfica B

7 May 2023 31	Benfica B	1–2	Nacional

13 May 2023 32	Feirense	1–2	Benfica B

19 May 2023 33	Benfica B	0–1	Farense

27 May 2023 34	Porto B	3–1	Benfica B
