= Hugo Évora =

Cape Verdean footballer (born 1981)

Personal information
- Full name: Hugo Miguel Magalhães Évora
- Date of birth: 17 February 1981 (age 45)
- Place of birth: Queluz, Portugal
- Height: 1.85 m (6 ft 1 in)
- Position: Defender

Youth career
- 1993–1997: Belas
- 1997–2000: Estrela Amadora

Senior career*
Years	Team	Apps	(Gls)
2000–2003	Estoril	14	(0)
2000–2001	→ Samora Correia (loan)		
2003–2004	Olhanense	27	(1)
2004–2005	Santa Clara	24	(0)
2005–2006	Olhanense	25	(1)
2006–2007	Olivais Moscavide	9	(0)
2007–2008	Ceahlăul	3	(0)
2008	Știința Bacău	20	(1)
2009	Luceafărul Lotus	5	(0)
2009–2010	Progresso		
2010–2011	Madalena	0	(0)
2011–2012	Recreios Algueirão		
2012–2013	Quarteirense	26	(1)
2013–2014	Lourinhanense	21	(0)
Total		174	(4)

International career
2005	Cape Verde	1	(0)
- * Club domestic league appearances and goals

Hugo Miguel Magalhães Évora (born 17 February 1981) is a Cape Verdean retired footballer who played as either a central defender or a left-back.
