= Diogo Spencer =

Portuguese footballer (born 2004)

Personal information
- Full name: Diogo Filipe Spencer Marques
- Date of birth: 17 April 2004 (age 22)
- Place of birth: Lisbon, Portugal
- Height: 1.78 m (5 ft 10 in)
- Position: Right back

Team information
- Current team: Alverca
- Number: 82

Youth career
- 2014–2015: CAC
- 2015–2016: Sacavenense
- 2016–2024: Benfica

Senior career*
Years	Team	Apps	(Gls)
2023–2026	Benfica B	39	(1)
2024–2026	Benfica	1	(0)
2025–2026	→ AVS (loan)	13	(1)
2026–	Alverca	7	(0)

International career
2023	Portugal U20	1	(0)
- * Club domestic league appearances and goals as of 25 May 2026

Diogo Filipe Spencer Marques (born 17 April 2004) is a Portuguese professional footballer who plays as a right-back for Primeira Liga club Alverca.

== Club career ==
=== Benfica ===
Born in Lisbon, Spencer began playing football as a midfielder for CAC. After a season at Sacavenense, he joined the youth ranks of Benfica aged 12. In August 2020, aged 16, he signed his first professional contract. He was a member of the team that won the UEFA Youth League in 2021–22, and in March 2023 he extended his contract by an undisclosed length.

On 14 April 2024, Spencer made his first-team debut in the Primeira Liga, in a 3–0 home win over Moreirense; he came on as a last-minute substitute for Tiago Gouveia. Over the season he also played for the youth, under-23 and reserve teams, totalling 13 games for the last of those in Liga Portugal 2 and scoring once to equalise in a 1–1 draw away to Tondela. In December 2024, he and fellow 20-year-olds Diogo Prioste and Hugo Félix extended their contracts to 2029.

Spencer was loaned to fellow top-flight club AVS on 19 August 2025, for the season. On 13 September, in his third game for the club from Vila das Aves, he scored his first Primeira Liga goal in a 3–1 loss away to Estoril. On 18 October, in a Taça de Portugal third round match away to Guarda Football Association team Fornos de Algodres, he scored twice in a 7–0 win. On 30 January 2026, having scored 3 goals in 16 appearances for AVS, his loan was terminated.

=== Alverca ===
The same day his loan at AVS was terminated, Spencer permanently left Benfica, joining Primeira Liga side Alverca. On 21 February 2026, he made his debut for the club in a 1–1 draw at home to Santa Clara as Nabil Touaizi was suspended for accumulation of five yellow cards.

== International career ==
On 17 November 2023, Spencer made his only appearance for the Portugal under-20 team, as a last-minute substitute for David Monteiro in a 2–1 friendly win over Norway in Amarante.

== Honours ==
Benfica U19

- UEFA Youth League: 2021–22
