= Ricardo Teixeira (disambiguation) =

Ricardo Teixeira (born 1947), former president of the Brazilian Football Confederation.

Ricardo Teixeira may also refer to:

- Ricardo Teixeira (racing driver) (born 1984), Angolan-Portuguese racing driver
- Ricardo Teixeira (footballer) (born 2001), Portuguese footballer
