= André Gomes (disambiguation) =

André Gomes is the name of:

- André Gomes, (André Filipe Tavares Gomes), Portuguese footballer
- André Gomes (footballer, born 1975), (Luiz André Gomes), Brazilian footballer
- André Gomes (footballer, born 1996), (André Gomes Alves), Brazilian footballer
- André Gomes (footballer, born 2004), (André Nogueira Gomes), Portuguese footballer
- André Gomes (footballer, born 2006), (André Filipe Machado Gomes), Portuguese footballer
- André Gomes (handballer), (André Dias Lopes Gomes), Portuguese handball player
