= Agustín Moreira =

Agustín Moreira may refer to:

- Agustín Moreira (cyclist)
- Agustín Moreira (footballer)
