= Henrique Silva (footballer, born 2005) =

Brazilian footballer (born 2005)

Personal information
- Full name: Henrique Fernandes da Silva
- Date of birth: 17 October 2005 (age 21)
- Place of birth: São Paulo, Brazil
- Height: 1.88 m (6 ft 2 in)
- Position: Centre back

Team information
- Current team: Santa Clara
- Number: 3

Youth career
- 2021–2024: Cruzeiro
- 2025: Santa Clara

Senior career*
Years	Team	Apps	(Gls)
2025–	Santa Clara	15	(0)
- * Club domestic league appearances and goals as of 21:00, 26 September 2026 (UTC)

Henrique Fernandes da Silva (born 17 October 2005) is a Brazilian professional footballer who plays as a centre back for Portuguese club Santa Clara.

== Career ==
Born in São Paulo, Silva played up to the under-20 side of Cruzeiro, being also known as Seninha and developing as both a defensive midfielder and a centre back. In September 2022, he signed his first professional contract, until the end of 2025. He helped the team win the under-20 Campeonato Mineiro and the Copa do Brasil Sub-20 in 2023. In January 2024, he played seven games as the club finished runners-up in the Copa São Paulo de Futebol Júnior. The following month, he and two teammates were excluded from training due to a partying scandal.

Silva signed for Santa Clara in Portugal in January 2025, being assigned to the under-23 side. His performances in the Liga Revelação earned him call-ups to first-team training and a new contract in September 2025, to last until 2028. On 29 October, he made his debut, as a substitute for the last 15 minutes of a 5–0 loss to Braga in the quarter-finals of the Taça da Liga. Over 2025–26, the International Centre for Sports Studies ranked him as the 6th best under-21 centre-back for build-up play.
