= André Gomes (footballer, born 2004) =

Portuguese footballer (born 2004)

Personal information
- Full name: André Nogueira Gomes
- Date of birth: 20 October 2004 (age 22)
- Place of birth: Ponte de Lima, Portugal
- Height: 1.82 m (6 ft 0 in)
- Position: Goalkeeper

Team information
- Current team: Casa Pia
- Number: 31

Youth career
- 2011–2015: Académica Ponte de Lima
- 2015–2016: CFT de Braga
- 2016–2023: Benfica

Senior career*
Years	Team	Apps	(Gls)
2023–2026	Benfica B	60	(0)
2023–2026	Benfica	0	(0)
2025–2026	→ Alverca (loan)	25	(0)
2026–	Casa Pia	5	(0)

International career^{‡}
2019	Portugal U15	3	(0)
2019	Portugal U16	3	(0)
2021–2022	Portugal U18	3	(0)
2021–2023	Portugal U19	12	(0)
2024	Portugal U20	2	(0)
2025–	Portugal U21	1	(0)
- * Club domestic league appearances and goals as of 6 September 2026 ‡ National team caps and goals as of 14:20, 8 November 2025 (UTC)

André Nogueira Gomes (born 20 October 2004) is a Portuguese professional footballer who plays as a goalkeeper for Casa Pia in Primeira Liga.

== Club career ==
Gomes began his career with the Académica de Futebol in Ponte de Lima, before moving to Benfica affiliate CFT in Braga. He joined the Benfica academy in 2016, going on to sign a professional contract in December 2020. In September 2021, he was included in English newspaper The Guardian's "Next Generation" list for the year, highlighting the best footballers born in 2004 worldwide. He became the youngest goalkeeper to play in a UEFA Youth League final, beating the record held by Croatian Karlo Žiger, when he played all 90 minutes in Benfica's 6–0 win over Red Bull Salzburg in the 2021–22 UEFA Youth League final.

On 23 April 2025, he made his debut for Benfica's senior squad as a late substitute in the second leg of the Taça de Portugal semifinal against the fourth-tier Tirsense, with the aggregate score already at 8–0 in Benfica's favour.

On 11 July 2025, Benfica sent Gomes on a season-long loan to recently-promoted Primeira Liga club Alverca.

== International career ==
Gomes has represented Portugal at youth international level.

== Career statistics ==
=== Club ===
As of match played 4 May 2025

Appearances and goals by club, season and competition
Club	Season	League			National cup		League cup		Other		Total	
Club	Season	Division	Apps	Goals	Apps	Goals	Apps	Goals	Apps	Goals	Apps	Goals
Benfica B	2022–23	Liga Portugal 2	13	0	—		—		—		13	0
Benfica B	2023–24	Liga Portugal 2	16	0	—		—		—		16	0
Benfica B	2024–25	Liga Portugal 2	31	0	—		—		—		31	0
Benfica B	Total		60	0	—		—		—		60	0
Benfica	2024–25	Primeira Liga	0	0	1	0	0	0	0	0	1	0
Alverca (loan)	2025–26	Primeira Liga	9	0	0	0	0	0	—		9	0
Career total			69	0	1	0	0	0	0	0	70	0

== Honours ==
Benfica

- Supertaça Cândido de Oliveira: 2023

Benfica Youth

- UEFA Youth League: 2021–22
- Under-20 Intercontinental Cup: 2022
- Campeonato Nacional de Juniores: 2021/22
