= Marko Milovanović (footballer, born 2003) =

Serbian footballer

Personal information
- Date of birth: 4 August 2003 (age 23)
- Place of birth: Smederevo, Serbia and Montenegro
- Height: 1.94 m (6 ft 4 in)
- Position: Forward

Team information
- Current team: Portsmouth
- Number: 29

Youth career
- 2010–2021: Partizan

Senior career*
| Years | Team | Apps | (Gls) |
| 2021–2022 | Partizan | 9 | (1) |
| 2022–2024 | Almería B | 20 | (4) |
| 2022–2026 | Almería | 31 | (1) |
| 2025–2026 | → Alverca (loan) | 31 | (9) |
| 2026– | Portsmouth | 12 | (3) |

International career^{‡}
| 2021 | Serbia U19 | 3 | (0) |
- * Club domestic league appearances and goals as of 21:15, 4 November 2026 (UTC) ‡ National team caps and goals as of 17:20, 8 October 2021 (UTC)

Marko Milovanović (Serbian Cyrillic: Марко Миловановић; born 4 August 2003), sometimes known as Marezi, is a Serbian professional footballer who plays as a forward for EFL Championship club Portsmouth.

== Club career ==
=== Partizan ===
Born in Smederevo, Milovanović joined the youth categories of Partizan in 2010. He made his official senior debut for the first team on 17 July 2021, coming on as a substitute for Nemanja Jović in the 60th minute in a match against Proleter Novi Sad.

On 1 December 2021, Milovanović scored his first goal for Partizan against Dubočica in Serbian Cup. Five days later, he scored his first league goal in a 2–0 victory against Novi Pazar. His first European goal for Partizan came on 9 December, in a UEFA Europa Conference League draw against Anorthosis. He made total of 27 appearances and scored 3 goals for the club.

=== Almería ===
On 11 July 2022, Milovanović signed a six-year contract with Spanish La Liga side Almería.

==== Loan to Alverca ====
On 15 July 2025, Milovanović was loaned to Portuguese Primeira Liga side Alverca, for one year.

=== Portsmouth ===
On 23 July 2026, Milovanović joined Championship side Portsmouth for an undisclosed fee on a four-year deal.

== International career ==
Milovanović has played internationally for Serbia at under-19 level.

== Career statistics ==
=== Club ===
As of match played 3 November 2026

Appearances and goals by club, season and competition
| Club | Season | League | | | National Cup | | League Cup | | Europe | | Other | | Total | |
| Club | Season | Division | Apps | Goals | Apps | Goals | Apps | Goals | Apps | Goals | Apps | Goals | Apps | Goals |
|---|---|---|---|---|---|---|---|---|---|---|---|---|---|---|
| Partizan | 2021–22 | Serbian SuperLiga | 9 | 1 | 0 | 0 | 0 | 0 | 7 | 1 | — | | 16 | 2 |
| UD Almería | 2022–23 | La Liga | 2 | 0 | 0 | 0 | 0 | 0 | — | | — | | 2 | 0 |
| UD Almería | 2023–24 | La Liga | 11 | 1 | 1 | 1 | 0 | 0 | — | | — | | 12 | 2 |
| UD Almería | 2024–25 | Segunda División | 18 | 0 | 3 | 1 | 0 | 0 | — | | — | | 21 | 1 |
| UD Almería | Total | | 31 | 1 | 4 | 2 | 0 | 0 | — | | 0 | 0 | 35 | 3 |
| Alverca (loan) | 2025–26 | Primeira Liga | 31 | 9 | 0 | 0 | 0 | 0 | — | | — | | 31 | 9 |
| Portsmouth | 2026–27 | Championship | 12 | 3 | 0 | 0 | 1 | 0 | — | | — | | 13 | 3 |
| Career total | | | 83 | 14 | 4 | 2 | 1 | 0 | 7 | 1 | 0 | 0 | 95 | 17 |
