= Diogo Capitão =

Portuguese footballer

Personal information
- Full name: Diogo André Simões Pedrosa Capitão Machado
- Date of birth: 6 March 2000 (age 26)
- Place of birth: Lisbon, Portugal
- Height: 1.88 m (6 ft 2 in)
- Position: Midfielder

Team information
- Current team: Emirates
- Number: 2

Youth career
- 2009–2021: Benfica

Senior career*
Years	Team	Apps	(Gls)
2021–2023	Benfica B	51	(0)
2023–2024	Al Urooba		
2024–2025	Mafra	24	(1)
2025–	Emirates	0	(0)

International career
2018	Portugal U18	6	(0)
2018–2019	Portugal U19	17	(1)
2019	Portugal U20	5	(0)
- * Club domestic league appearances and goals as of 5 June 2025

Diogo André Simões Pedrosa Capitão Machado (born 6 March 2000) is a Portuguese professional footballer who plays as a midfielder for Emirates.

== International career ==
Capitão has represented Portugal at youth international level.

== Career statistics ==
=== Club ===
As of match played 27 May 2023

Appearances and goals by club, season and competition
Club	Season	League			National cup		League cup		Other		Total	
Club	Season	Division	Apps	Goals	Apps	Goals	Apps	Goals	Apps	Goals	Apps	Goals
Benfica B	2021–22	Liga Portugal 2	19	0	—		—		—		19	0
Benfica B	2022–23	Liga Portugal 2	32	0	—		—		—		32	0
Benfica B	Total		51	0	—		—		—		51	0
Al Urooba	2023–24	UAE First Division League	0	0	0	0	—		—		0	0
Career total			51	0	0	0	0	0	0	0	51	0
