= Alex Amorim =

Brazilian footballer (born 2005)

Personal information
- Full name: Alexasando Amorim de Freitas Filho
- Date of birth: 18 May 2005 (age 21)
- Place of birth: Fortaleza, Brazil
- Height: 1.77 m (5 ft 10 in)
- Position: Midfielder

Team information
- Current team: Genoa
- Number: 4

Youth career
- 2022–2024: Fortaleza

Senior career*
| Years | Team | Apps | (Gls) |
| 2023–2025 | Fortaleza | 0 | (0) |
| 2025 | → Athletic-MG (loan) | 25 | (3) |
| 2025–2026 | Alverca | 19 | (2) |
| 2026– | Genoa | 11 | (0) |
- * Club domestic league appearances and goals as of 25 May 2026

Alexsandro Amorim de Freitas Filho (born 18 May 2005) is a Brazilian professional footballer who plays as a midfielder for Genoa in Italy's Serie A.

== Career ==
=== Fortaleza ===
Amorim was born in Fortaleza, and began his career at Fortaleza Esporte Clube. After going on to Santos FC and Fluminense FC, he returned to his hometown club at under-17 level in April 2022 and signed a three-year contract.

In 2023, Amorim made two substitute appearances in the first team, against Águia de Marabá Futebol Clube in the Copa do Brasil and Estudiantes de Mérida F.C. in the Copa Sudamericana. At the start of the following year, under contract until the end of 2027, he began training with the professional squad. He played 15 games and scored four goals for the under-20 team in state and national competitions in 2024.

==== Loan to Athletic ====
For the year 2025, Amorim was loaned to Athletic Club (MG), newcomers to the Campeonato Brasileiro Série B. His transfer was briefly held up by a FIFA-imposed ban on registering new players due to unpaid debts to Moreirense F.C. over the transfer of Wallisson. His side won the Troféu Inconfidência of the Campeonato Mineiro, in which he scored in a 2–0 win away to Uberlândia Esporte Clube in the first leg of the final on 8 March. On 7 April, he made his debut in the national second tier, in a 4–2 loss away to Atlético Clube Goianiense; he scored his club's first-ever goal in the competition within nine minutes. Across all competitions, he played 27 games, scored three goals and assisted one.

=== Alverca ===
On 5 July 2025, Amorim moved on a three-year contract to F.C. Alverca, newly promoted to the Primeira Liga; the Portuguese club had the same ownership as Athletic. Fortaleza sold 50% of the player's economic rights for R$2 million. He scored his first goal on 4 October, equalising with a long-range shot in a 3–1 comeback victory at AVS Futebol SAD.

=== Genoa ===
On 29 January 2026, Amorim was signed by Genoa of Italy's Serie A. The Italian club paid a reported fee of €8 million, which could rise to €10 million with add-ons.

== Career statistics ==
As of match played 29 January 2026

Appearances and goals by club, season and competition
| Club | Season | League | | | State league | | National cup (Note: Includes Copa do Brasil, Taça de Portugal) | | League cup (Note: Includes Taça da Liga) | | Continental | | Total | |
| Club | Season | Division | Apps | Goals | Apps | Goals | Apps | Goals | Apps | Goals | Apps | Goals | Apps | Goals |
|---|---|---|---|---|---|---|---|---|---|---|---|---|---|---|
| Fortaleza | 2023 | Série A | 0 | 0 | 0 | 0 | 1 | 0 | — | | 1 (Note: Appearance in Copa Sudamericana) | 0 | 2 | 0 |
| Fortaleza | 2024 | Série A | 0 | 0 | 0 | 0 | 0 | 0 | — | | 0 | 0 | 0 | 0 |
| Fortaleza | Total | | 0 | 0 | 0 | 0 | 1 | 0 | — | | 1 | 0 | 2 | 0 |
| Athletic-MG (loan) | 2025 | Série B | 14 | 1 | 11 (Note: Appearances in Campeonato Mineiro) | 2 | 2 | 0 | — | | — | | 27 | 3 |
| Alverca | 2025–26 | Primeira Liga | 19 | 2 | — | | 1 | 0 | 1 | 0 | — | | 21 | 2 |
| Genoa | 2025–26 | Serie A | 0 | 0 | — | | 0 | 0 | — | | — | | 0 | 0 |
| Career total | | | 33 | 3 | 11 | 2 | 4 | 0 | 1 | 0 | 1 | 0 | 50 | 5 |
