= Robinho (footballer, born 1988) =

Brazilian footballer

Personal information
- Full name: Robson Chaves Santana
- Date of birth: 28 February 1988 (age 38)
- Place of birth: São Paulo, Brazil
- Height: 1.75 m (5 ft 9 in)
- Positions: Attacking midfielder; winger

Team information
- Current team: Olímpia FC
- Number: 20

Youth career
- 2000–2003: São Paulo
- 2004–2005: EC Juventude

Senior career*
Years	Team	Apps	(Gls)
2006–2007	EC Juventude	45	(13)
2007–2008	Palmeiras	34	(12)
2009–2010	Figueirense	49	(13)
2010	Neuchâtel	9	(0)
2011–2012	Tractor	12	(1)
2012–2013	→Figueirense (loan)	45	(8)
2014–2015	→Criciúma EC (loan)	45	(16)
2016–2017	Mumbai	7	(1)
2018–2020	→ Olímpia FC (loan)	41	(5)
- * Club domestic league appearances and goals as of 10 February 2020

Robson Chaves Santana (born 28 February 1988) better known as just Robinho, is a Brazilian professional footballer who plays as a midfielder for Olímpia FC on loan from Mumbai FC.

== Career ==
Robinho was formed in the basic categories of São Paulo F.C. and further excel in EC Juventude in 2005, where he was the top scorer of the Copa FGF team, Robinho hit two-year contract with Palmeiras.

In January 2009, he moved to figueirense where he played for two seasons.

After a few seasons in international leagues, he joined on loan the Olímpia FC team.

== Club career statistics ==
Club performance			League		State League		Cup		League Cup		Continental		Total	
Season	Club	League	Apps	Goals	Apps	Goals	Apps	Goals	Apps	Goals	Apps	Goals	Apps	Goals
2006–07	EC Juventude	Série A	6	1	10	2	27	10	-		-		45	13
2007–08	Palmeiras	Campeonato Paulista	-		8	1	11	5	15	6	-		34	12
2009–10	Figueirense	Série B	9	1	16	3	24	9	-		-		49	13
2010–11	Neuchâtel Xamax	2. Liga interregional	-		9	0			-		-		9	0
2011–12	Tractor	Persian Gulf Cup	8	0		4	1		-		-		12	1
2012–13	Figueirense	Campeonato Catarinense	-		18	4			27	4	-		45	8
2014–15	Criciúma EC	Copa SC	-		21	6	24	10	-		-		45	16
2016–17	Mumbai FC	I-league	4	0	-		3	1	-		-		7	1
2018–19	Olímpia FC	Copa Paulista			12	1	29	4	-				41	5
Career total													287	69
