= Dani Borges =

Brazilian footballer (born 2003)

Personal information
- Full name: Daniel Borges da Silva
- Date of birth: 6 April 2003 (age 23)
- Place of birth: Porto Seguro, Brazil
- Height: 1.83 m (6 ft 0 in)
- Position: Midfielder

Team information
- Current team: Santa Clara
- Number: 41

Youth career
- 2017–2019: Atlético Mineiro

Senior career*
Years	Team	Apps	(Gls)
2019–2024	Atlético Mineiro	12	(2)
2019-2024	→ Bahia de Feira (loan)	2	(0)
2024–	Santa Clara	22	(0)
2025–2026	→ União de Leiria (loan)	27	(6)
- * Club domestic league appearances and goals as of 20 September 2026

Daniel Borges da Silva (born 6 April 2003) is a Brazilian professional footballer who plays as a defensive midfielder for Portuguse Primeira Liga club Santa Clara.

== Career ==
A youth product of Atlético Mineiro since 2017, Dani Borges made his senior debut with Bahia de Feira on loan in 2019 in the Campeonato Brasileiro Série D. He returned to Atlético Mineiro on a contract until 2025, where he played for their U20 side, and captain them 3 times. In January 2024, his contract with the club was terminated.

He moved to the Portuguese club Santa Clara, where he was originally assigned to their U23 team. On 19 October 2024, he made his senior debut with Santa Clara in a 1–0 Taça de Portugal win over Gondomar.

On 29 April 2025, Borges renewed his contract with Santa Clara until June 2030. On 19 July, he was sent on a season-long loan to Liga Portugal 2 club União de Leiria.

== Career statistics ==
As of match played 20 September 2026

Appearances and goals by club, season and competition
Club	Season	League			State league		National cup		League Cup		Other		Total	
Club	Season	Division	Apps	Goals	Apps	Goals	Apps	Goals	Apps	Goals	Apps	Goals	Apps	Goals
Atlético Mineiro	2019	Série A	0	0	0	0	0	0	—		—		0	0
Atlético Mineiro	2022	Série A	0	0	4	1	0	0	—		—		4	1
Atlético Mineiro	2023	Série A	0	0	4	1	0	0	—		—		4	1
Atlético Mineiro	2024	Série A	0	0	4	0	0	0	—		—		4	0
Atlético Mineiro	Total		0	0	12	2	0	0	—		—		12	2
Bahia de Feira (loan)	2019	Série D	2	0	—		0	0	—		—		2	0
Santa Clara	2024–25	Primeira Liga	16	0	—		3	0	1	0	—		20	0
Santa Clara	2026–27	Primeira Liga	6	0	—		0	0	0	0	—		6	0
Santa Clara	Total		22	0	—		3	0	1	0	—		26	0
União de Leiria (loan)	2025–26	Liga Portugal 2	27	6	—		3	1	—		—		30	7
Career total			51	6	12	2	6	1	1	0	0	0	70	9
