= Robinho (footballer, born 2002) =

Brazilian footballer (born 2002)

Personal information
- Full name: Robson Lucas Oliveira Botelho
- Date of birth: 7 August 2002 (age 24)
- Place of birth: Estrela Dalva, Brazil
- Height: 1.80 m (5 ft 11 in)
- Position: Midfielder

Team information
- Current team: Estrela da Amadora
- Number: 8

Youth career
- 2021–2022: Volta Redonda

Senior career*
Years	Team	Apps	(Gls)
2023–2025	Volta Redonda	85	(3)
2025–	Estrela da Amadora	28	(0)
- * Club domestic league appearances and goals as of 15:16, 27 October 2026 (UTC)

Robson Lucas Oliveira Botelho (born 7 August 2002), known as Robinho, is a Brazilian professional footballer who plays as a midfielder for Portuguese club Estrela da Amadora.

== Career ==
Born in Estrela Dalva in the state of Minas Gerais, Robinho was a youth player at Volta Redonda. In 2024, he was a regular player as the club won promotion to the Campeonato Brasileiro Série B as champions of Série C. The following January, Seongnam in South Korea bid R$2.5 million for 70% of his economic rights, an offer rejected by Volta Redonda. He renewed his contract in June, up to 2027. He played 87 games over all competitions, scoring three goals and assisting four.

In July 2025, however, Robinho moved to Estrela da Amadora in Portugal's Primeira Liga. The transfer fee was the highest received by Volta Redonda, R$3.5 million or €525,000, more than trebling the R$1.1 million from the sale of Evertton Araújo to Flamengo. He joined on a three-year deal. He made his debut on 11 August as the season began with a 1–1 draw away to nearby Estoril, but was substituted at half time with a concussion that led to his hospitalisation.

== Honours ==
Volta Redonda

- Campeonato Brasileiro Série C: 2024
