= Estrela Dalva =

Coordinates: 21°45′S 42°26′W

- Municipality
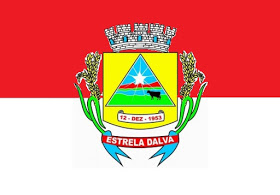
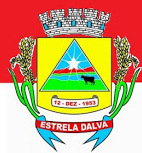
- Flag Coat of arms
- Interactive map of Estrela Dalva
- Country: Brazil
- Region: Southeast
- State: Minas Gerais
- Mesoregion: Vale do Rio Doce

Population (2020)
  - Total: 2,325
- Time zone: UTC−3 (BRT)

Estrela Dalva is a municipality in the state of Minas Gerais in the Southeast region of Brazil.

== See also ==
- List of municipalities in Minas Gerais
