= Fábio Ronaldo =

Portuguese footballer

Personal information
- Full name: Fábio Ronaldo da Costa Conceição
- Date of birth: April 28, 2001 (age 25)
- Place of birth: Vila Nova de Gaia, Portugal
- Height: 1.78 m (5 ft 10 in)
- Position: Winger

Team information
- Current team: Motor Lublin
- Number: 11

Youth career
- 2011–2012: Leixões
- 2012: SC Arcozelo
- 2012–2014: Porto
- 2014–2015: Palmeiras FC
- 2015–2016: Boavista
- 2016–2017: Rio Ave
- 2017–2018: Sporting CP
- 2018–2020: Rio Ave

Senior career*
Years	Team	Apps	(Gls)
2020–2021	Rio Ave B	14	(3)
2020–2025	Rio Ave	91	(5)
2025	Estrela da Amadora	13	(1)
2025–	Motor Lublin	27	(4)
- * Club domestic league appearances and goals as of 21:34, 29 May 2026 (UTC)

Fábio Ronaldo da Costa Conceição (born 28 April 2001) is a Portuguese professional footballer who plays as a winger for Ekstraklasa club Motor Lublin.

== Professional career ==
Fábio Ronaldo is a youth product of Leixões, Dragon Force, Porto, Palmeiras FC, Boavista, Sporting CP and Rio Ave. He began his senior career with the Rio Ave reserves in the 2020–21 season. He made his professional debut with Rio Ave in a 1–1 Liga Portugal 2 tie with Farense on 15 August 2021. He signed his first professional contract with Rio Ave on 26 August 2021, tying him to the club until 2026.

In January 2025, Ronaldo moved to Estrela da Amadora. On 8 September 2025, he signed with Polish club Motor Lublin on a deal until June 2027.

== Honours ==
Rio Ave

- Liga Portugal 2: 2021–22
