= Francisco Chissumba =

Portuguese footballer (born 2005)

Personal information
- Full name: Francisco Edgar Chissumba Rodrigues
- Date of birth: 29 May 2005 (age 21)
- Place of birth: Braga, Portugal
- Height: 1.80 m (5 ft 11 in)
- Position: Left-back

Team information
- Current team: Alverca (on loan from Braga)
- Number: 55

Youth career
- 2014–2023: Braga
- 2018–2019: → Palmeiras FC (loan)
- 2020–2021: → Palmeiras FC (loan)

Senior career*
Years	Team	Apps	(Gls)
2023–	Braga B	40	(4)
2025–	Braga	16	(0)
2025–	→ Alverca (loan)	23	(0)

International career^{‡}
2021	Portugal U16	4	(1)
2021	Portugal U17	3	(0)
2022–2023	Portugal U18	7	(0)
2023–2024	Portugal U19	9	(0)
2024	Portugal U20	6	(0)
2025–	Portugal U21	4	(0)
- * Club domestic league appearances and goals as of 5 September 2026 ‡ National team caps and goals as of 18 November 2025

Francisco Edgar Chissumba Rodrigues (born 29 May 2005) is a Portuguese professional footballer who plays as a left-back for Primeira Liga club Alverca on loan from Braga.

== Career ==
Chissumba is a youth product of his childhood club Braga, and worked his way up through their youth categories with a couple loan stints at Palmeiras FC. On 18 July 2021, he signed his first professional contract with Braga until 2024. He debuted with their reserves in 2023 in the Liga 3. On 21 January 2024, he extended his contract with Braga until 2028. He made the matchday squad as Braga won the 2024 Taça da Liga final on 27 January 2024.

Chissumba made his senior and professional debut with Braga as a starter in a 3–0 win over Boavista on 26 January 2025. On 18 February 2025, he was formally promoted to Braga's senior team.

On 13 August 2025, Chissumba was sent on a season-long loan to recently-promoted Primeira Liga side Alverca. The loan was extended for the 2026–27 season.

== International career ==
Born in Portugal, Chissumba is of Angoche Mozambique descent. He is a youth international for Portugal, having played in every youth level up to the Portugal U20s in 2024.

== Career statistics ==
As of match played 8 November 2025

Appearances and goals by club, season and competition
Club	Season	League			National cup		League cup		Europe		Other		Total	
Club	Season	Division	Apps	Goals	Apps	Goals	Apps	Goals	Apps	Goals	Apps	Goals	Apps	Goals
Braga B	2023–24	Liga 3	24	3	—		—		—		—		24	3
Braga B	2024–25	Liga 3	16	1	—		—		—		—		16	1
Braga B	Total		40	4	—		—		—		—		40	4
Braga	2024–25	Primeira Liga	16	0	1	0	0	0	1 (Note: Appearances in UEFA Europa League)	0	—		18	0
Alverca (loan)	2025–26	Primeira Liga	9	0	1	0	1	0	—		—		11	0
Career total			65	7	2	0	1	0	1	0	0	0	69	7

== Honours ==
Braga

- Taça da Liga: 2023–24
