= Tomás Mendes =

Spanish footballer (born 2004)

Personal information
- Full name: Tomás Alage Mendes Mendes
- Date of birth: 21 November 2004 (age 21)
- Place of birth: Almería, Spain
- Height: 1.79 m (5 ft 10 in)
- Position: Defensive midfielder

Team information
- Current team: Alavés

Youth career
- 2010–2015: La Mojonera
- 2015–2018: Almería
- 2018–2020: Alavés

Senior career*
Years	Team	Apps	(Gls)
2020–2025	Alavés B	112	(1)
2021–	Alavés	2	(0)
2025–2026	→ Alverca (loan)	5	(0)

International career^{‡}
2018–2019	Spain U15	4	(0)
2019	Spain U16	1	(0)
2021–2022	Spain U18	9	(0)
- * Club domestic league appearances and goals as of 18 February 2026 ‡ National team caps and goals as of 30 June 2022

Tomás Alage Mendes Mendes (born 21 November 2004) is a Spanish professional footballer who plays as a defensive midfielder for Deportivo Alavés.

== Club career ==
Mendes was a youth product of La Mojonera and Almería, before joining the youth academy of Alavés in 2018. He began his senior career with the reserves Alavés B in 2020. On 4 March 2021, Mendes signed a professional contract keeping him with Alavés at least until 2023. He was a mainstay with Alavés B at the age of 17, and helped them win the 2021–22 Tercera División RFEF and earn promotion. He made his first appearance with the senior Alavés team in a 3–0 Copa del Rey win over Unami on 30 November 2021, coming on as a substitute in the 84th minute. He made his La Liga and professional debut with Alavés in a 4–0 loss to Celta Vigo on 7 May 2022, coming on in the 82nd minute.

On 10 July 2025, Mendes moved abroad for the first time in his career, joining FC Alverca of the Portuguese Primeira Liga on a one-year loan deal.

== International career ==
Born in Spain, Mendes is of Bissau-Guinean descent. He is a youth international for Spain, having represented the Spain U15s and U16s. He represented the Spain U18 in a friendly tournament in Romania in the fall of 2021.
