= Tomás Azevedo =

Portuguese footballer

Personal information
- Full name: Tomás Alexandre Rente de Azevedo
- Date of birth: 12 October 2000 (age 26)
- Place of birth: Azeitão, Portugal
- Height: 1.78 m (5 ft 10 in)
- Position: Midfielder

Team information
- Current team: Montana
- Number: 27

Youth career
- 2008–2009: Brejos de Azeitão
- 2009–2011: Fabril
- 2011–2012: Vitória de Setúbal
- 2012–2013: Sporting CP
- 2013–2014: Barreirense
- 2014–2015: Almada
- 2015–2016: Fabril
- 2016–2019: Vitória de Setúbal
- 2019–2021: Benfica

Senior career*
| Years | Team | Apps | (Gls) |
| 2021–2023 | Benfica B | 4 | (0) |
| 2023–2024 | Amora | 18 | (1) |
| 2024–2025 | Lusitânia | 17 | (0) |
| 2025– | Montana | 28 | (0) |

International career^{‡}
| 2018 | Portugal U18 | 7 | (0) |
- * Club domestic league appearances and goals as of 11 June 2026 ‡ National team caps and goals as of 28 February 2021

Tomás Alexandre Rente de Azevedo (born 12 October 2000) is a Portuguese professional footballer who plays as a midfielder for Bulgarian First League club Montana.

== Playing career ==
On 27 July 2019, Azevedo signed a professional contract with Benfica B. He made his professional debut with Benfica B in a 2–0 LigaPro win over Casa Pia A.C. on 7 February 2021.
