= Kaiky Naves =

Brazilian footballer (born 2002)

Naves
Personal information
- Full name: Kaiky Marques Naves
- Date of birth: 8 May 2002 (age 24)
- Place of birth: Santos, Brazil
- Height: 1.84 m (6 ft 0 in)
- Positions: Centre-back; defensive midfielder

Team information
- Current team: Necaxa
- Number: 5

Youth career
- 2010–2015: Santos
- 2016–2017: Portuguesa Santista
- 2017–2022: Palmeiras

Senior career*
Years	Team	Apps	(Gls)
2021–2026	Palmeiras	39	(0)
2025–2026	→ Alverca (loan)	32	(2)
2026–	Necaxa	7	(0)
- * Club domestic league appearances and goals as of 29 September 2026

Kaiky Marques Naves (born 8 May 2002), known as Kaiky Naves or just Naves, is a Brazilian professional footballer who plays as a centre-back or defensive midfielder for Liga MX club Necaxa.

== Club career ==
Born in Santos, São Paulo, Naves began his career with hometown side Santos, initially as a part of the futsal youth sides. He was released by the club in 2015, and spent a period at Portuguesa Santista before joining Palmeiras' youth setup in October 2017.

On 4 July 2019, Naves signed his first professional contract with the club, until 2022. He made his first team – and Série A – debut on 6 December 2021, starting in a 0–0 away draw against Athletico Paranaense, as most of the first team squad was already on vacation.

On 9 May 2022, Naves renewed his contract with Verdão until 2025.

In 2024, the defender played 15 games, 12 of them as a starter, including one in the Libertadores.

On 20 July 2025, Naves was loaned by Alverca in Portugal.

== Career statistics ==
As of 23 May 2022

Club	Season	League			State league		Cup		Continental		Other		Total	
Club	Season	Division	Apps	Goals	Apps	Goals	Apps	Goals	Apps	Goals	Apps	Goals	Apps	Goals
Palmeiras	2021	Série A	2	0	0	0	0	0	0	0	—		2	0
Palmeiras	2022	Série A	1	0	0	0	0	0	0	0	0	0	1	0
Career total			3	0	0	0	0	0	0	0	0	0	3	0

== Honours ==
Palmeiras

- Recopa Sudamericana: 2022
- Campeonato Paulista: 2022
