= Steven Baseya =

French footballer (born 2005)

Personal information
- Date of birth: 14 January 2005 (age 21)
- Place of birth: Longjumeau, France
- Height: 1.89 m (6 ft 2 in)
- Position: Centre-back

Team information
- Current team: Alverca
- Number: 14

Youth career
- 2013–2016: JS Longjumelloise
- 2016–2020: Massy 91 FC
- 2020–2022: Nancy

Senior career*
Years	Team	Apps	(Gls)
2022–2023	Nancy B	24	(1)
2023	Nancy	2	(0)
2023–2025	Strasbourg B	13	(0)
2024–2025	Strasbourg	2	(0)
2024–2025	→ Villefranche (loan)	26	(1)
2025–	Alverca	12	(0)

International career^{‡}
2022	France U17	1	(0)
2023	France U18	1	(0)
2023–2024	France U19	5	(0)
2024–	France U20	11	(0)
- * Club domestic league appearances and goals as of 25 May 2026 ‡ National team caps and goals as of 18 October 2025

Steven Baseya (born 14 January 2005) is a French professional footballer who plays as a centre-back for Portuguese Primeira Liga club Alverca.

== Club career ==
On 13 January 2023, Baseya made his senior debut for Nancy in a 1–1 draw against Le Puy in the Championnat National. At the end of the season, he left the club after deciding not to sign a professional contract.

On 23 June 2023, Baseya signed for Ligue 1 club Strasbourg on a three-year contract, becoming BlueCo's first signing. On 6 January 2024, he made his debut for the club in a 4–0 win over Avoine in the Coupe de France round of 64. His Ligue 1 debut came on 28 January 2024 in a 1–1 draw against Clermont.

On 15 August 2024, Baseya joined Championnat National club Villefranche on loan until the end of the season.

On 5 July 2025, Baseya signed with Alverca in Portugal.

== International career ==
Born in France, Baseya is of Congolese descent and holds dual citizenship. He has represented France at youth international level. He was called up by the under-18s in March 2023.

== Honours ==
France U20

- Maurice Revello Tournament: 2025
