= Julián Martínez (footballer) =

Honduran football player (born 2003)

Personal information
- Full name: José Julián Martínez Crisanto
- Date of birth: 1 December 2003 (age 22)
- Place of birth: La Ceiba, Honduras
- Height: 1.85 m (6 ft 1 in)
- Position: Centre-back

Team information
- Current team: Alverca
- Number: 3

Youth career
- 2015–2021: Victoria
- 2021–2022: GSM Sport
- 2022: Miramar Misiones
- 2022–2023: Olimpia

Senior career*
Years	Team	Apps	(Gls)
2023–2025	Olimpia	82	(2)
2025–	Alverca	11	(0)

International career^{‡}
2023	Honduras U20	1	(0)
2023	Honduras U23	4	(0)
2023–	Honduras	10	(1)
- * Club domestic league appearances and goals as of 25 May 2026 ‡ National team caps and goals as of 4 July 2025

José Julián Martínez Crisanto (born 1 December 2003) is a Honduran professional football player who plays as a centre-back for Primeira Liga club Alverca and the Honduras national team.

== Career ==
Martínez is a youth product of the academies of Victoria, GSM Sport, Miramar Misiones, and Olimpia. He began his senior career in the Liga Nacional de Fútbol Profesional de Honduras in 2023, helping the club win 1 Apertura and 3 Clausura titles. He was named the most valuable player for the 2024-25 Clausura tournament.

== International career ==
Martínez was called up to the Honduras U20s for the 2023 FIFA U-20 World Cup. He was then called up to the Honduras U23s for the 2023 Pan American Games.

Martínez was called up to the senior Honduras national team for the 2025 CONCACAF Gold Cup.

== Personal life ==
Martínez is the younger brother of the footballer Edwin Solano. He has a degree in computer science.

== Career statistics ==
=== Club ===
As of 20 September 2025

Club	Division	Season	League		Cup		Continental		Total	
Club	Division	Season	Apps	Goals	Apps	Goals	Apps	Goals	Apps	Goals
Olimpia	Liga Nacional de Fútbol Profesional de Honduras	2022-23	6	0	–		–		6	0
Olimpia	Liga Nacional de Fútbol Profesional de Honduras	2023-24	39	0	–		2	0	41	0
Olimpia	Liga Nacional de Fútbol Profesional de Honduras	2024-25	37	2	–		3	0	40	2
Olimpia	Total		82	2	0	0	5	0	87	2
Alverca	Primeira Liga	2025-26	3	0	–		–		3	0
Career total			85	2	0	0	5	0	90	2

== Honours ==
Olimpia

- Liga Nacional de Fútbol Profesional de Honduras: 2022-23 Clausura, 2023-24 Apertura, 2023-24 Clausura, 2024-25 Clausura

Individual

- 2024-25 Clausura Most Valuable Player
