= Figueiredo (footballer, born 2001) =

Brazilian footballer (born 2001)

Personal information
- Full name: Lucas Figueiredo dos Santos
- Date of birth: 14 August 2001 (age 25)
- Place of birth: Niterói, Brazil
- Height: 1.78 m (5 ft 10 in)
- Position: Forward

Team information
- Current team: Alverca
- Number: 20

Youth career
- –2021: Vasco da Gama

Senior career*
Years	Team	Apps	(Gls)
2021–2025	Vasco da Gama	93	(4)
2024	→ Coritiba (loan)	42	(2)
2025	→ América Mineiro (loan)	30	(5)
2025–	Alverca	27	(6)

International career
2023	Brazil U23	4	(0)
Medal record
Men's football
Representing Brazil
Pan American Games
Winner	2023 Santiago
- * Club domestic league appearances and goals as of 25 May 2026

Lucas Figueiredo dos Santos (born 14 August 2001), known as just Figueiredo, is a Brazilian professional footballer who plays as a forward for Portuguese Primeira Liga club Alverca.

== Career ==
On 1 September 2025, Figueiredo signed with Portuguese Primeira Liga club Alverca.
