= Sabit Abdulai =

Ghanaian footballer

Personal information
- Full name: Sabit Abdulai
- Date of birth: 11 May 1999 (age 27)
- Place of birth: Techiman, Ghana
- Height: 1.85 m (6 ft 1 in)
- Position: Midfielder

Team information
- Current team: Alverca
- Number: 21

Youth career
- Spartans

Senior career*
Years	Team	Apps	(Gls)
2017–2019	Spartans		
2018–2019	→ Extremadura B (loan)	20	(1)
2019–2020	Extremadura B	22	(3)
2020–2021	Extremadura	4	(1)
2020–2021	→ Getafe B (loan)	15	(0)
2021	→ Getafe (loan)	3	(0)
2021–2022	Getafe B	5	(0)
2022–2024	Getafe	0	(0)
2022–2023	→ Ponferradina (loan)	19	(0)
2023	→ Lugo (loan)	15	(0)
2024	→ Murcia (loan)	15	(0)
2024–2025	Botafogo-SP	32	(2)
2025–	Alverca	17	(0)

International career
2019	Ghana U20	3	(0)
- * Club domestic league appearances and goals as of 18 February 2026

Sabit Abdulai (born 11 May 1999) is a Ghanaian footballer who plays as a central midfielder for Primeira Liga club Alverca.

== Club career ==
Born in Techiman, Abdulai moved to Spain in 2017 to join Deportivo Alavés, but paperwork issues ruled out the move. He later had trials at Rio Ave (where he was also unable to sign a contract due to administrative problems) and UB Conquense, before joining Extremadura UD from Spartans FC in July 2018 on a one-year loan deal, and was assigned to the reserves in Tercera División. Roughly one year later, after being regularly used, he signed a permanent five-year contract with the club.

Abdulai made his first team debut for Extremadura on 4 July 2020, coming on as a second-half substitute for compatriot Emmanuel Lomotey in a 0–1 Segunda División away loss against CD Numancia. He scored his first professional goal sixteen days later, netting his team's only in a 1–5 loss at UD Las Palmas.

On 19 August 2020, Abdulai was loaned to Getafe CF, being initially assigned to the B-team in Segunda División B. He made his La Liga debut with the main squad the following 3 April, replacing Carles Aleñá late into a 0–0 draw at CA Osasuna.

After signing a permanent three-year contract with Geta in 2021, but suffered a serious knee injury in July of that year, being sidelined for eight months. On 8 August 2022, he was loaned to SD Ponferradina in the second division, for one year.

On 20 August 2024, Abdulai signed with Botafogo-SP in Brazil.
