= Luan Patrick =

Brazilian footballer (born 2002)

Personal information
- Full name: Luan Patrick Wiedthäuper
- Date of birth: 20 January 2002 (age 24)
- Place of birth: Carazinho, Brazil
- Height: 1.90 m (6 ft 3 in)
- Position: Centre-back

Team information
- Current team: Estrela da Amadora
- Number: 30

Youth career
- 2012–2015: Internacional
- 2016: Juventude
- 2016–2018: Figueirense
- 2018–2020: Athletico Paranaense

Senior career*
Years	Team	Apps	(Gls)
2020–2024	Athletico Paranaense	5	(0)
2022	→ América Mineiro (loan)	10	(0)
2023	→ Red Bull Bragantino (loan)	20	(0)
2025	Hellas Verona	0	(0)
2025–	Estrela da Amadora	31	(0)

International career
2019	Brazil U17	8	(0)
2020	Brazil U20	3	(0)
2024	Brazil Olympic	2	(0)
Medal record
Men's football
Representing Brazil
FIFA U17 World Cup
Winner	2019
- * Club domestic league appearances and goals as of 25 May 2026

Luan Patrick Wiedthäuper (born 20 January 2002), known as Luan Patrick, is a Brazilian footballer who plays as a central defender for Primeira Liga side Estrela da Amadora.

== Club career ==
=== Early career ===
Born in Carazinho, Rio Grande do Sul, Luan Patrick played futsal in his hometown before being invited to join the youth categories of Internacional at the age of nine. Released after three years, he spent eight months at Juventude before signing for Figueirense, which led him to a move to Athletico Paranaense in September 2018.

=== Athletico Paranaense ===
Luan Patrick made his first team debut with Furacão on 9 February 2020, starting in a 1–0 Campeonato Paranaense away loss to FC Cascavel. He later returned to the under-20 squad, and signed a new contract until 2024 on 2 July.

Luan Patrick his Série A debut on 10 February 2021, in a 3–3 draw at Corinthians.

==== Loan to América Mineiro ====
On 12 April 2022, after featuring mainly with the under-23s, Luan Patrick was loaned to fellow top tier side América Mineiro until the end of the year. Mainly a backup option, he featured in 12 matches overall before returning to his parent club, as a new loan was not agreed.

==== Loan to Red Bull Bragantino ====
On 23 January 2023, Red Bull Bragantino announced the signing of Luan Patrick on a one-year loan deal. Despite featuring in 26 matches, he was mainly a backup option to Léo Ortiz and Leonardo Realpe, and left the club in December.

==== Return from loans ====
Back to Athletico for the 2024 season, Luan Patrick played his first match for the club in nearly two years on 25 February, a 3–1 home win over São Joseense. In March, however, he was separated from the first team squad after failing to sign a contract renewal, and left the club in November after rescinding his link.

=== Hellas Verona ===
On 24 February 2025, Luan Patrick signed with Hellas Verona in Italy until June 2028.

=== Estrela da Amadora ===
On 10 July 2025, Luan Patrick moved to Estrela da Amadora in Portugal on a three-season contract.

== International career ==
Luan Patrick played for the Brazil national under-17 team at the 2019 FIFA U-17 World Cup, being a regular starter in the tournament. On 5 January 2024, he was included in Ramon Menezes' 23-man list for the 2024 CONMEBOL Pre-Olympic Tournament, but was only a backup option in the competition.

== Career statistics ==
As of 3 January 2025

Club	Season	League			State league		Cup		Continental		Other		Total	
Club	Season	Division	Apps	Goals	Apps	Goals	Apps	Goals	Apps	Goals	Apps	Goals	Apps	Goals
Athletico Paranaense	2020	Série A	1	0	4	0	0	0	0	0	0	0	5	0
Athletico Paranaense	2021	Série A	2	0	8	0	0	0	1 (Note: Appearance(s) in Copa Sudamericana)	0	—		11	0
Athletico Paranaense	2022	Série A	0	0	9	0	0	0	0	0	—		9	0
Athletico Paranaense	2024	Série A	0	0	2	0	0	0	0	0	—		2	0
Athletico Paranaense	Total		3	0	23	0	0	0	1	0	0	0	27	0
América Mineiro (loan)	2021	Série A	10	0	—		2	0	—		—		12	0
Red Bull Bragantino (loan)	2023	Série A	14	0	6	0	1	0	5	0	—		26	0
Hellas Verona	2024–25	Serie A	0	0	—		—		—		—		0	0
Estrela da Amadora	2025–26	Primeira Liga	0	0	—		0	0	—		0	0	0	0
Career total			27	0	29	0	3	0	6	0	0	0	65	0

== Honours ==
Athletico Paranaense

- Campeonato Paranaense: 2020, 2024
- Supercopa do Brasil runner-up: 2020
- Copa Sudamericana: 2021
- Recopa Sudamericana runner-up: 2022

Brazil U17

- FIFA U-17 World Cup: 2019
