= Ricardo Teixeira (footballer) =

Portuguesefootballer

Personal information
- Full name: Ricardo Jorge Martins Teixeira
- Date of birth: 7 June 2001 (age 25)
- Place of birth: Porto, Portugal
- Height: 1.88 m (6 ft 2 in)
- Position: Centre-back

Team information
- Current team: Académica de Coimbra
- Number: 3

Youth career
- 2009–2013: Alfa AC
- 2013–2021: Leixões

Senior career*
Years	Team	Apps	(Gls)
2021–2022	Leixões	13	(0)
2022–2025	Benfica B	4	(0)
2023–2024	→ Leixões (loan)	4	(0)
2025–	Académica de Coimbra	34	(1)
- * Club domestic league appearances and goals as of 7 May 2026

Ricardo Jorge Martins Teixeira (born 7 June 2001) is a Portuguese professional footballer who plays as a centre-back for Liga Portugal 2 club Académica de Coimbra.

== Career ==
Teixeira is a youth product of the academies of Alfa AC and Leixões. He began his senior career with Leixões in the Liga Portugal 2 in 2021. He made his professional debut with Leixões in a 2-1 league match against Académica de Coimbra on 22 May 2021. On 2 September 2022, he transferred to Benfica B for €300,000, signing a contract until 2026.

== Honours ==
Individual

- Liga Portugal 2 Defender of the Month: August 2022
