= Davy Gui =

Ivorian footballer

Personal information
- Full name: Davy Jean Carl Kamon Gui
- Date of birth: June 15, 2006 (age 20)
- Place of birth: Péhé, Ivory Coast
- Height: 1.85 m (6 ft 1 in)
- Position: Midfielder

Team information
- Current team: Alverca
- Number: 6

Youth career
- AS Indenié Abengourou

Senior career*
Years	Team	Apps	(Gls)
2024–2025	Dijon II	13	(1)
2025	Dijon	12	(0)
2025–	Alverca	29	(1)
- * Club domestic league appearances and goals as of 20:53, 29 July 2026 (UTC)

Davy Jean Carl Kamon Gui (born 15 June 2006) is an Ivorian footballer who plays as a midfielder for Alverca in the Primeira Liga.

== Club career ==
A youth product of the Ivorian club AS Indenié Abengourou, Gui signed with the Championnat National club Dijon on 13 September 2024 on a 2-year contract. On 8 July 2025, he signed for Primeira Liga Alverca as a free agent on a 3-year contract. In his debut season with Alverca, he was the most-used substitute in the league coming from the bench on 21 times by March 2026.

Gui made an immediate impact as an impact substitute during his first season at Alverca. By March 2026, he had become the most-used substitute in the entire Primeira Liga, having appeared 21 times off the bench compared to a single start, totalling 431 minutes with one goal and two assists. His only start of the season came in an away win over Aves SAD, which Alverca won 3–1. He finished the 2025–26 season with 29 total appearances, 26 of them as a substitute, and the club identified him as a key player to develop heading into the 2026–27 season.

== Personal life ==
Gui is the brother of the Ivorian rapper Suspect 95.
