= Agustín Moreira (footballer) =

Uruguayan footballer (born 2001)

Personal information
- Full name: Agustín Nahuel Moreira Morales
- Date of birth: 14 August 2001 (age 25)
- Place of birth: Canelones Department, Uruguay
- Height: 1.74 m (5 ft 9 in)
- Positions: Winger; forward

Team information
- Current team: Gil Vicente (on loan from Progreso)
- Number: 27

Youth career
- –2020: Defensor Sporting
- 2021: Progreso

Senior career*
Years	Team	Apps	(Gls)
2022–	Progreso	88	(7)
2025–	→ Gil Vicente (loan)	21	(2)
- * Club domestic league appearances and goals as of 25 May 2026

Agustín Nahuel Moreira Morales (born 14 August 2001) is a Uruguayan professional footballer who plays as a winger or forward for Primeira Liga club Gil Vicente, on loan from Progreso.

== Career ==
As a youth player, Moreira joined the youth academy of Uruguayan side Defensor Sporting. Following his stint there, he joined the youth academy of Uruguayan side Progreso in 2021 and was promoted to the club's senior team ahead of the 2022 season, helping them achieve promotion from the second tier to the top flight. During the summer of 2025, he was sent on loan to Portuguese side Gil Vicente.

== Style of play ==
Moreira plays as a winger or forward. Right-footed, he is known for his dribbling ability.

== Personal life ==
Moreira was born on 14 August 2001. Born in Canelones Department, Uruguay, he has been nicknamed "Picante".
