= Isaac James (footballer) =

Nigerian footballer (born 2004)

Personal information
- Date of birth: 28 August 2004 (age 22)
- Place of birth: Okpo, Olamaboro, Nigeria
- Height: 1.75 m (5 ft 9 in)
- Position: Left-back

Team information
- Current team: Alverca
- Number: 12

Youth career
- –2022: Garden City Panthers FC

Senior career*
Years	Team	Apps	(Gls)
2022–2025	Lorient B	41	(3)
2024–2025	Lorient	7	(0)
2025–	Alverca	19	(0)

International career^{‡}
2026–	Nigeria	1	(0)
- * Club domestic league appearances and goals as of 25 May 2026 ‡ National team caps and goals as of 6 October 2026

Isaac James (born 28 August 2004) is a Nigerian professional footballer who plays as a left-back for Primeira Liga club Alverca and the Nigeria national team.

== Career ==
In November 2021, after having completed a trial at Danish club Midtjylland, James tried out at French club Lorient. In a friendly against Avranches, he was put in the opposing squad in order to even out the numbers. Against his future teammates, James put in a performance described as "excellent", prompting Lorient to eventually recruit him. In July 2022, he left Nigerian club Garden City Panthers FC to sign for Lorient's reserve squad. He would only make his Championnat National 2 debut in December 2022 due to administrative issues related to his visa.

On 24 August 2024, James made his Ligue 2 and professional debut for Lorient in a 2–0 win over Grenoble. His first start came in a 1–1 draw against Metz on 21 September 2025. By the end of the season, Lorient had won the Ligue 2 title, achieving promotion to Ligue 1.

On 2 July 2025, James signed with Alverca in Portugal.

== International career ==
On 6 October 2026, James made his debut for the Nigeria national team in a friendly against Russia.

== Honours ==
Lorient

- Ligue 2: 2024–25
