= Cédric Nuozzi =

Belgian footballer

Personal information
- Full name: Cédric Jean-Luc Nuozzi
- Date of birth: January 30, 2006 (age 20)
- Place of birth: Liège, Belgium
- Height: 1.77 m (5 ft 9 1/2 in)
- Position: Winger

Team information
- Current team: Alverca
- Number: 11

Youth career
- Standard Liège
- 2020–2022: Genk

Senior career*
Years	Team	Apps	(Gls)
2022–2025	Jong Genk	58	(6)
2025–	Alverca	25	(1)

International career^{‡}
2021–2022	Belgium U16	16	(3)
2022–2023	Belgium U17	9	(2)
2023–2024	Belgium U18	6	(2)
2024–2025	Belgium U19	5	(0)
2023	Belgium U20	2	(0)
- * Club domestic league appearances and goals as of 21:50, 29 July 2026 (UTC) ‡ National team caps and goals as of 21:50, 29 July 2026 (UTC)

Cédric Jean-Luc Nuozzi (born 30 January 2006) is a Belgian footballer who plays as a winger for Primeira Liga club Alverca.

== Club career ==
A youth product of Standard Liège, Nuozzi joined Genk's youth academy in 2020 to finish his development. On 8 December 2022 at the age of 16, he signed a professional contract with Genk until 2025. On 2 July 2025, he joined newly promoted Primeira Liga club Alverca on a free transfer.

== International career ==
Born in Belgium, Nuozzi is of Italian descent through his father, and Spanish descent through his mother. He is a youth international for Belgium, having been called up to the Belgium U20s in 2023.
