= C.D. Santa Clara =

Portuguese professional football club

Santa Clara
- Full name: Clube Desportivo Santa Clara
- Nickname: Os Açorianos (The Azoreans)
- Founded: 1921; 105 years ago
- Ground: Estádio de São Miguel, Ponta Delgada, Portugal
- Capacity: 12,500
- President: Bruno Vicintin
- Head coach: Petit
- League: Primeira Liga
- 2025–26: Primeira Liga, 13th of 18
- Website: cdsantaclara.com
Home colours	Away colours

Clube Desportivo Santa Clara is a Portuguese professional football club from Ponta Delgada, Azores. As the most successful football team from the Azores Islands, they are the only team from the archipelago to compete in a UEFA competition, having qualified for the UEFA Intertoto Cup and the UEFA Europa Conference League.

Santa Clara is the only club from the Azores to have competed in the top division of the Portuguese Liga, being thus the westernmost top-flight club in Europe. They compete in the Primeira Liga, the Portuguese first division football league. Santa Clara's kit manufacturer is Umbro and their main sponsor is Lebull. The main local rivals are CD Operário from Lagoa on the same island of São Miguel. Other major rivals are C.S. Marítimo and C.D. Nacional, from the island of Madeira.

== History ==
Santa Clara reached the Primeira Liga for the first time by coming third in the 1998–99 Liga de Honra, but were instantly relegated back in last place. The team bounced back by winning the 2000–01 Segunda Liga under Manuel Fernandes and later Carlos Manuel. Fernandes, who left for Sporting CP in January 2001, returned in October.

Despite coming 14th in their first top-flight season, Santa Clara were chosen by UEFA to play in the 2002 UEFA Intertoto Cup when Vitória S.C. withdrew, needing the summer to renovate their Estádio D. Afonso Henriques for UEFA Euro 2004. They beat Armenia's Shirak FC 5–3 on aggregate in the first round before falling 9–2 to Czechs FK Teplice in the second. Santa Clara were relegated in 2003, and then spent the next 15 years in the second tier, with the lowest point being 2014–15 when the club came 19th, saving themselves from relegation with three games remaining.

In 2018, Carlos Pinto's Santa Clara team ended their exile by finishing second to C.D. Nacional, and he subsequently left. His successor João Henriques led Santa Clara to two consecutive 10th-placed finishes, their best results for position and points (43) in their history. He left in July 2020, having secured a third consecutive top-flight season for the first time in club history. Under his successor Daniel Ramos in 2020–21, the club finished a best-ever sixth to qualify for the inaugural UEFA Conference League.

Santa Clara defeated KF Shkupi (North Macedonia) and NK Olimpija Ljubljana (Slovenia) before falling to FK Partizan (Serbia) in the Conference League playoffs. Ramos left unexpectedly in October 2021 with the team in 15th. Mário Silva concluded the season with the team in 7th, earning a two-year contract extension, as well as taking the team to the semi-finals of the Taça da Liga (at FC Porto's expense) for the first time. Silva was sacked in January 2023 with the team 15th after as many games; the form did not improve under successors Jorge Simão and Danildo Accioly and Santa Clara finished last, ending five years in the top flight.

The following season, under new manager Vasco Matos, Santa Clara were crowned champions of the 2023-24 Liga Portugal 2, securing their promotion back to the top flight of Portuguese football. The 2024-25 Primeira Liga season saw Santa Clara finish with a club record 57 points, good enough for 5th place and qualification to the 2025-26 UEFA Conference League for the second time in club history.

== Stadium ==
Santa Clara play in the 12,500-seat Estádio de São Miguel in Ponta Delgada, the largest city in the Azores. Prior to this, the club also used Campo Municipal Jácome Correia to host home games.

== Honours ==
- Segunda Liga
  - Winners (2): 2000–01, 2023–24
- Portuguese Second Division B
  - Winners (1): 1997–98

== Players ==
=== Current squad ===
As of 15 September 2026

Note: Flags indicate national team as defined under FIFA eligibility rules; some limited exceptions apply. Players may hold more than one non-FIFA nationality.

No.	Pos.	Nation	Player
1	GK	BRA	Lucas França
3	DF	BRA	Henrique Silva
4	DF	POR	Pedro Pacheco
5	DF	BRA	Guilherme Romão (on loan from Atlético Goianiense)
6	MF	POR	Pedro Ferreira
7	FW	BRA	Fernando
8	MF	CPV	Djé Tavares
9	FW	POR	Gonçalo Paciência (captain)
10	FW	BRA	Brenner Lucas
11	FW	BRA	Welinton Torrão
12	GK	BRA	Neneca
17	MF	POR	João Vasconcelos
18	FW	POR	Afonso Duarte

No.	Pos.	Nation	Player
19	DF	BRA	Ythallo
20	MF	POR	Tiago Ribeiro
21	DF	POR	Emanuel Moreira
22	MF	BRA	Vitinho
25	MF	POR	Fredy
32	DF	BRA	MT
41	MF	BRA	Dani Borges
42	DF	BRA	Lucas Soares
70	FW	BRA	Vinícius Lopes
73	FW	BRA	Léo Jacó
85	DF	POR	Kamika
99	FW	BRA	Sorriso

=== Other players under contract ===
Note: Flags indicate national team as defined under FIFA eligibility rules; some limited exceptions apply. Players may hold more than one non-FIFA nationality.

No. / Pos. / Nation / Player; — / GK / BRA / Cristian	No. / Pos. / Nation / Player; — / FW / BRA / Vitinho

=== Out on loan ===
Note: Flags indicate national team as defined under FIFA eligibility rules; some limited exceptions apply. Players may hold more than one non-FIFA nationality.

No.	Pos.	Nation	Player
—	DF	BRA	Alysson (at Leixões until 30 June 2027)
—	DF	BRA	Douglas Borel (at Penafiel until 30 June 2027)
—	DF	BRA	Edney Silva (at Portimonense until 30 June 2027)
—	DF	BRA	Sidney Lima (at Partizan until 30 June 2027)
—	MF	BRA	Andrey (at AVS until 30 June 2027)
—	MF	BRA	Hiago (at AVS until 30 June 2027)

No.	Pos.	Nation	Player
—	MF	BRA	Rildo (at Avaí until 31 December 2026)
—	FW	POR	João Costa (at Felgueiras until 30 June 2027)
—	FW	BRA	Jader Gentil (at Portimonense until 30 June 2027)
—	FW	POR	Henrique Pereira (at Feirense until 30 June 2027)
—	FW	BRA	Wendel Silva (at Ceará until 31 December 2026)

== International players ==
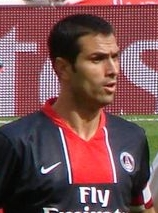
Pauleta played for Santa Clara in 1991 at youth level before moving on to bigger clubs where he would become one of the best Portuguese strikers of all time.

- (Albania) Klevis Dalipi
- (Angola) Figueiredo
- (Angola) Kali
- (Angola) Mauro
- (Angola) Francisco Zuela
- (Angola) José Vidigal
- (Brazil) Leandro Machado
- (Canada) Pedro Pacheco
- (Cape Verde) Hernâni Borges
- (Cape Verde) Mateus Lopes
- (Cape Verde) Steven Pereira
- (Cape Verde) Stopira
- (Cape Verde) Valter Borges
- (Cape Verde) Platini
- (Cape Verde) António Duarte
- (Cape Verde) Hugo Évora
- (El Salvador) Denis Pineda
- (Gabon) Malick Evouna
- (Guinea-Bissau) Mamadu Candé
- (Guinea-Bissau) Amido Baldé
- (Guinea-Bissau) Édson
- (Hungary) István Vincze
- (Iran) Shahriyar Moghanlou
- (Iran) Mohammad Mohebi
- (Iraq) Osama Rashid
- (Ivory Coast) Idrissa Keita
- (Japan) Hidemasa Morita
- (Libya) Muaid Ellafi
- (Libya) Mohamed Al-Gadi
- (Libya) Hamdou Elhouni
- (Morocco) Faysal El Idrissi
- (Mozambique) Reginaldo Faife
- (Nigeria) Garba Lawal
- (Nigeria) Haruna Doda
- (Panama) Abdiel Arroyo
- (Panama) Alfredo Stephens
- (Portugal) Pauleta
- (Portugal) Marco Paiva
- (Portugal) André Pinto
- (Portugal) Pedro Martins
- (Portugal) Jorge Ribeiro
- (Portugal) Ukra
- (Portugal) Jorge Silva
- (Portugal) José Leal
- (Portugal) António Pacheco
- (Slovakia) Martin Chrien
- (Venezuela) Mikel Villanueva

== Coaching staff ==
Position	Name
Manager	(Portugal) Vasco Matos
Assistant manager	(Portugal) João Batista (Portugal) João Pereira
First-team coach	(Portugal) Leandro Pires
Goalkeeper coach	(Brazil) Luciano Oliveira
Fitness coach	(Brazil) Rogério Juidecce (Portugal) João Gavazzo
Analyst	(Portugal) Nicolau Carvalho
Physiotherapist	(Brazil) André Rocha (Portugal) Diogo Moniz (Portugal) Bruno Viveiros (Portugal) Jony Xavier (Portugal) Francisco Silva Cabral
Physiologist	(Portugal) Rafael Gregório
Chief scout	(Portugal) Diogo Fonseca
Scout	(Portugal) Hugo Melo; Manuel Sousa
Sporting director	(Portugal) Paulo Clemente
Squad planner	(Brazil) Rafael Andrade
Academy manager	(Portugal) Leandro Rodrigues (Portugal) Luís Pires
Kit manager	(Portugal) Alfredo Arruda

== Managers ==
- (Portugal) Vasco Matos (1 July 2023 – 31 January 2026)
- (Portugal) Petit (3 February 2026 – present)

== League and cup history ==
Season	Div.	Pos.	Pl.	W	D	L	GS	GA	P	Cup	League Cup	Notes
1982–83	3DS	7	30	12	6	12	42	39	30	Round 2		
1983–84	3DS	7	30	12	7	11	38	32	31	Round 2		
1984–85	3DS	10	30	11	6	13	32	26	28	Round 2		
1985–86	3DS	4	30	14	8	8	34	20	36	Round 2		
1986–87	3DS	2	30	16	8	6	54	29	40	Round 1		Promoted
1987–88	2DS	20	38	5	13	20	19	51	23	Round 3		Relegated
1988–89	3DS	10	34	13	9	12	35	32	35	Round 2		
1989–90	3DS	1	34	18	9	7	54	41	45	Round 2		Promoted
1990–91	2DS	14	34	12	9	17	40	56	33	Round 2		Relegated
1991–92	3DS	5	34	15	9	10	55	34	39	Round 2		
1992–93	3DS	14	34	8	14	12	27	40	30	Round 1		
1993–94	3DS	13	34	10	9	15	28	52	29	Round 1		
1994–95	3DS	18	34	3	9	22	20	70	15	Round 1		
1995–96	3DS	1	26	16	7	3	48	15	55	Round 1		Promoted
1996–97	2DS	2	34	19	6	9	67	36	63	Round 3		
1997–98	2DS	1	34	18	8	5	60	31	65	Round 4		Promoted
1998–99	2H	3	34	13	13	7	53	37	55	Round 5		Promoted
1999–00	1D	18	34	7	10	17	35	50	31	Round 5		Relegated
2000–01	2H	1	34	20	7	7	60	37	67	Round 3		Promoted
2001–02	1D	14	34	9	10	15	32	46	37	Round 5		
2002–03	1D	17	34	8	11	15	39	54	35	Round 5		Relegated
2003–04	2H	13	34	11	9	14	41	44	42	Round 3		
2004–05	2H	15	34	11	6	17	39	49	39	Round 4		
2005–06	2H	6	34	13	12	9	45	32	51	Round 4		
2006–07	2H	4	30	15	5	10	34	31	50	Round 4		
2007–08	2H	10	30	10	7	13	31	50	37	Round 4	Round 1	
2008–09	2H	3	30	15	7	8	45	32	52	Round 5	Round 1	
2009–10	2H	4	30	13	12	5	45	29	51	Round 4	First Group Stage	
2010–11	2H	9	30	10	8	12	26	29	38	Round 3	First Group Stage	
2011–12	2H	12	30	8	10	12	29	38	34	Round 2	Second Group Stage	
2012–13	2H	11	42	15	14	13	55	48	59	Round 4	Round 2	
2013–14	2H	15	42	13	9	20	38	46	48	Round 3	Round 2	
2014–15	2H	19	46	10	21	15	33	42	51	Round 2	Round 1	
2015–16	2H	16	46	15	12	19	49	52	57	Round 3	Round 1	
2016–17	2H	10	42	16	12	14	42	42	60	Round 4	Round 2	
2017–18	2H	2	38	19	9	10	55	40	66	Round 5	Round 2	Promoted
2018–19	1D	10	34	11	9	14	43	45	42	Round 4	Round 2	
2019–20	1D	9	34	11	10	13	36	41	43	Round 5	Round 3	
2020–21	1D	6	34	13	7	14	44	36	46	Quarter-finals		
2021–22	1D	7	34	9	13	12	38	54	40	Round 3	Semi-finals	
2022–23	1D	18	34	5	7	22	26	58	22	Round 3	Group stage	Relegated
2023–24	2D	1	34	21	10	3	48	19	73	Quarter-finals	First round	Promoted
2024–25	1D	5	34	17	6	11	36	32	57	Fifth round	Quarter-finals	Best league finish
2025–26	1D	13	34	9	9	16	32	41	36	Fifth round	Quarter-finals	

== European record ==
=== UEFA club competition record ===
Season	Competition	Round	Opponent	Home	Away	Aggregate
2002–03	Intertoto Cup	R1	(Armenia) Shirak	2–0	3–3	5–3
2002–03	Intertoto Cup	R2	(Czech Republic) Teplice	1–4	1–5	2–9
2021–22	Europa Conference League	2QR	(North Macedonia) Shkupi	2–0	3–0	5–0
2021–22	Europa Conference League	3QR	(Slovenia) Olimpija Ljubljana	2–0	1−0	3−0
2021–22	Europa Conference League	PO	(Serbia) Partizan	2–1	0–2	2–3
2025–26	Conference League	2QR	(Croatia) Varaždin	2–0	1–2	3–2
2025–26	Conference League	3QR	(Northern Ireland) Larne	0–0	3–0	3–0
2025–26	Conference League	PO	(Republic of Ireland) Shamrock Rovers	1–2	0–0	1–2

=== UEFA coefficient ===
Correct as of 21 May 2025.

Rank	Team	Points
129	(Portugal) F.C. Arouca	12.453
130	(Portugal) Gil Vicente F.C.	12.453
131	(Portugal) C.D. Santa Clara	12.453
132	(Portugal) F.C. Paços de Ferreira	12.453
133	(Portugal) Rio Ave F.C.	12.453
