= Francisco Domingues =

Portuguese footballer (born 2002)

Personal information
- Full name: Francisco Miguel Teixeira Domingues
- Date of birth: 16 April 2002 (age 24)
- Place of birth: Lisbon, Portugal
- Height: 1.80 m (5 ft 11 in)
- Position: Left-back

Team information
- Current team: Moreirense
- Number: 27

Youth career
- 2010–2022: Benfica
- 2018–2019: → Belenenses (loan)

Senior career*
| Years | Team | Apps | (Gls) |
| 2022–2025 | Benfica B | 39 | (1) |
| 2025– | Moreirense | 27 | (1) |
- * Club domestic league appearances and goals as of 25 May 2026

Francisco Miguel Teixeira Domingues (born 16 April 2002), sometimes known as Kiko, is a Portuguese professional footballer who plays as a left-back for Primeira Liga club Moreirense.

== Career ==
Domingues is a youth product of Benfica, and signed his first professional contract with the club on 20 February 2020. On 12 August 2022, he made his senior and professional debut with Benfica B as a late substitute in a 1–1 Liga Portugal 2 tie with Tondela.

On 2 July 2025, Domingues signed a four-year contract with Primeira Liga club Moreirense.
