= Nabil Touaizi =

Moroccan footballer

Personal information
- Full name: Nabil Zoubdi Touaizi
- Date of birth: 1 February 2001 (age 25)
- Place of birth: Santomera, Spain
- Height: 1.83 m (6 ft 0 in)
- Position: Right-back

Team information
- Current team: Alverca
- Number: 2

Youth career
- Santomera
- 2014–2017: Valencia
- 2017–2020: Manchester City

Senior career*
Years	Team	Apps	(Gls)
2020–2023	Espanyol B	78	(7)
2022	Espanyol	1	(0)
2023–2024	Atlético Madrid B	32	(3)
2024–2025	Albacete	25	(1)
2025–	Alverca	33	(1)

International career^{‡}
2017–2018	Spain U17	6	(5)
2019	Spain U19	1	(0)
2021	Morocco U20	5	(0)
2022	Morocco U23	2	(0)
- * Club domestic league appearances and goals as of 25 May 2026 ‡ National team caps and goals as of 25 September 2022

Nabil Zoubdi Touaizi (born 1 February 2001) is a professional footballer who plays as a right-back for Primeira Liga club Alverca. Born in Spain, he represents Morocco at under-20 level.

== Club career ==
=== Early career ===
Born in Santomera, Murcia, Touaizi joined Valencia's youth setup in 2014, from hometown side CF Santomera. On 31 January 2017, he moved abroad and joined Manchester City's Academy.

=== Espanyol ===
On 23 September 2020, Touaizi returned to his home country and signed a four-year deal with RCD Espanyol, being initially assigned to the reserves in Segunda División B. He made his senior debut on 18 October, coming on as a late substitute for Juan Camilo Becerra in a 2–1 home win over AE Prat.

Touaizi scored his first senior goal on 3 April 2022, netting the opener in a 2–0 home success over SD Formentera. He made his first team – and La Liga – debut on 13 August, replacing Vinícius Souza late into a 2–2 away draw against RC Celta de Vigo.

=== Atlético Madrid ===
On 1 September 2023, Touaizi signed a two-year contract with Atlético Madrid, being assigned to the reserves in Primera Federación.

=== Albacete ===
On 9 August 2024, Touaizi agreed to a two-year deal with Albacete Balompié in Segunda División. Despite being regularly used, he terminated his link on 1 August 2025.

=== Alverca ===
On 5 August 2025, Touaizi signed with Alverca of the Portuguese Primeira Liga.

== International career ==
After representing Spain at under-17 level, Touaizi switched allegiance to Morocco in September 2019. In 2021, he started to appear with the latter nation's under-20 side.
