= C.F. Estrela da Amadora =

Portuguese sports club

Estrela da Amadora
- Full name: Club Football Estrela da Amadora SAD
- Nicknames: Tricolores (The Tricolours); Estrela (Star)
- Founded: 11 July 2020; 6 years ago
- Stadium: Estádio José Gomes
- Capacity: 9,288
- President: Johannes Mösmang
- Head coach: Pepa
- League: Primeira Liga
- 2025–26: Primeira Liga, 15th of 18
- Website: estrelamadora.pt
Home colours	Away colours

Club Football Estrela Amadora SAD (Portuguese pronunciation: [ɨʃˈtɾelɐ ðɐ ɐmɐˈðoɾɐ]), sometimes Estrela Amadora, Estrela da Amadora or just Estrela is a Portuguese professional sports club (predominantly football) based in Amadora, northwest of Lisbon. The team is currently competing in the Primeira Liga, the top tier of Portuguese football, after winning promotion from Liga Portugal 2 in 2022–23.

It is the successor of Clube de Futebol Estrela da Amadora, founded in 1932 and extinct in 2011 due to financial problems and bankruptcy. The club was newly founded in 2020, when Clube Desportivo Estrela merged with Club Sintra Football and taking the place of that team in the third-tier Campeonato de Portugal. C.F. Estrela da Amadora plays at Estádio José Gomes.

== History ==
The current club was founded in the summer of 2020, after a merger between Clube Desportivo Estrela and Club Sintra Football. Instead of Clube de Futebol Estrela da Amadora, the club is officially named Club Football Estrela da Amadora and André Geraldes was designated as the President.

After Clube de Futebol Estrela da Amadora closed its doors in 2011, a group of supporters founded Clube Desportivo Estrela, keeping the legacy, youth teams and other sports of the original club.

In 2018, CD Estrela created a senior football team, playing in the Lisbon Football Association regional championships. In 2020, the club's members voted 92% in favour in July 2020 of a merger with Club Sintra Football, taking that team's place in the third-tier Campeonato de Portugal. A Sociedade Anónima Desportiva was formed, branded as Club Football Estrela da Amadora and with André Geraldes being the President. The original Clube de Futebol Estrela da Amadora emblem was taken. The club's first season ended with promotion, despite losing the play-off final 1–0 to C.D. Trofense.

Estrela won promotion to the Primeira Liga via the playoffs in the 2022–23 season, defeating C.S. Marítimo on penalties.

On 10 May 2022, Indonesian company Pakuan Football Enterprise, led by Dodi Irwan Suparno, officially acquired Club Football Estrela da Amadora. The acquisition was announced via the club’s official Instagram account. The company cited the club’s historical legacy and its significance in Portuguese football as key reasons for the investment, despite the team then competing in the second tier, Liga Portugal 2, which has since achieved promotion to the Primeira Liga.

In August 2026, 90% of CFEA – Club Football Estrela, SAD, the company responsible for Estrela da Amadora's professional football operations, was sold for an estimated €40 million to an international investment consortium led by ADvantage and LEAD, with the support of the KI Group. The consortium also included strategic investors from international football, including Thomas Müller, Mats Hummels, Yann Sommer and Lucas Hernandez. Former Bayern Munich executive Johannes Mösmang became president of the SAD, succeeding Paulo Lopo.

== Players ==
=== Current squad ===
As of 5 September 2026

Note: Flags indicate national team as defined under FIFA eligibility rules; some limited exceptions apply. Players may hold more than one non-FIFA nationality.

No.	Pos.	Nation	Player
3	DF	FRA	Lucas Mincarelli
4	DF	BRA	Bernardo Schappo
5	DF	SRB	Stefan Leković (captain)
6	MF	SWE	Kevin Höög Jansson
8	MF	BRA	Robinho
10	FW	ROU	Ianis Stoica
11	FW	URU	Rodrigo Dudok (on loan from Racing de Montevideo)
14	MF	CRO	Lovro Zvonarek
17	DF	GBS	Jefferson Encada
18	MF	MNE	Vuk Pavićević
19	MF	ESP	Joan Jordán
21	DF	GER	Max Scholze
22	GK	POR	David Grilo
24	GK	BRA	Léo Linck (on loan from Botafogo)
28	MF	FRA	Tom Moustier

No.	Pos.	Nation	Player
29	FW	ECU	Jeremy Arévalo (on loan from VfB Stuttgart)
30	DF	BRA	Luan Patrick (vice-captain)
37	FW	PUR	Leandro Antonetti
39	MF	CIV	Eddy Doué
41	FW	KOR	Yang Si-Woo
49	FW	BEL	René Mitongo (on loan from Trabzonspor)
51	GK	POR	Diogo Pinto
55	DF	POR	Rafa Soares
71	MF	FRA	Emerson Vanga
72	FW	BRA	Henrique Poniewas
78	MF	POR	Santiago Serra
79	DF	BUL	Atanas Chernev
80	FW	BRA	Alisson Souza
93	FW	FRA	Bénito
99	FW	NGR	Abraham Marcus

=== Out on loan ===
Note: Flags indicate national team as defined under FIFA eligibility rules; some limited exceptions apply. Players may hold more than one non-FIFA nationality.

No.	Pos.	Nation	Player
—	GK	GER	Dudu (at Portimonense until 30 June 2027)
—	MF	ANG	Alex Sola (at Ironi Kiryat Shmona until 30 June 2027)
—	FW	ANG	João Gastão (at Farense until 30 June 2027)

No.	Pos.	Nation	Player
—	FW	GER	Chilohem Onuoha (at TSV Hartberg until 30 June 2027)
—	FW	NED	Sydney van Hooijdonk (at PEC Zwolle until 30 June 2027)

== Coaching staff ==
Position	Name
Head coach	(Portugal) Pepa
Assistant coach	(Portugal) Samuel Correia (Portugal) Hugo Silva
Goalkeeper coach	(Portugal) João Ricardo (Portugal) Alemão
Fitness coach	(Portugal) Sérgio Querido (Portugal) Gustavo Barão
Analyst	(Portugal) Pedro Azevedo
Doctor	(Portugal) Frederico Moeda
Squad planner	(Portugal) João Marau (Portugal) João Pedro Sousa
Manager	(Portugal) Mauro de Almeida
President	(Germany) Johannes Mösmang

== League and Cup history ==
Season	League	Pos.	Pl.	W	D	L	GS	GA	P	Portuguese Cup	Portuguese League Cup	Notes
2020–21	CP	2	29	19	7	3	43	17	53 (regular phase)	Round of 16	N/A	Promoted
2021–22	2D	14	34	9	10	15	42	55	37	4th round	2nd round	N/A
2022–23	2D	3	34	16	15	3	55	33	63	2nd round	Group Stage, 3rd in Group C	Promoted via play-off
2023–24	1D	14	34	7	12	15	33	53	63	4th round	1st round	

== Kit ==
Estrela's kit is white with the shirt split with three colours (hence the nickname 'the tricolours'). Left side was red, the middle white and the right green, with the shorts and socks white.
