= F.C. Alverca =

Portuguese football club

Alverca
- Full name: Futebol Clube de Alverca
- Founded: 1 September 1939; 87 years ago
- Ground: Complexo Desportivo FC Alverca, Alverca do Ribatejo
- Capacity: 6,932
- Owner: Vinícius Júnior (70-80%)
- President: Fernando Orge
- Head coach: Sérgio Ferreira
- League: Primeira Liga
- 2025–26: Primeira Liga, 11th of 18
- Website: alvercasad.pt
| Home colours | Away colours | Third colours |

Futebol Clube de Alverca is a professional football club based in Alverca do Ribatejo, Vila Franca de Xira, Portugal. The team play in the Liga Portugal, the top tier of Portuguese football, after promotion from the Liga Portugal 2 in the 2024–25 season.

== History ==
F.C. Alverca was founded on 1 September 1939.

After many decades in the lower levels of Portuguese football, Alverca was promoted to the top level in 1998, and played there in four of the next five editions, also coming back for 2003–04, which also ended in relegation; during most of this time, the club acted as feeder club to S.L. Benfica. Alverca played one more year in level two, before folding for financial reasons, in 2005.

In 2006, Alverca re-formed, beginning at regional level in the Lisbon Football Association's District Leagues, and being promoted in 2007–08 to the first division of that category.

In 2017–18, Alverca won promotion back to the national level, as district champions. On 17 October 2019, Alverca won 2–0 in the third round of the Taça de Portugal against Big Three club Sporting CP, becoming only the second third-tier club in history to knock them out the cup; the other was F.C. Tirsense in 1948. Fellow Primeira Liga club Rio Ave F.C. beat Alverca by a single goal in the next round. Alex Apolinário, scorer of the first goal in the win over Sporting, died in January 2021, days after collapsing in a match for Alverca.

In February 2025, Vinícius Júnior and his partners became co-owners of the club, acquiring between 70% and 80% of its shares for roughly €8 million to €10 million.

In May 2025, Alverca got their back-to-back promotion to Liga Portugal.

== Stadium ==
The club's home venue is the 6,932 capacity Complexo Desportivo do FC Alverca.

== Players ==
=== Current squad ===
As of 11 September 2026

Note: Flags indicate national team as defined under FIFA eligibility rules; some limited exceptions apply. Players may hold more than one non-FIFA nationality.

| No. | Pos. | Nation | Player |
|---|---|---|---|
| 1 | GK | FRA | Noah Raveyre |
| 2 | DF | MAR | Nabil Touaizi |
| 3 | DF | HON | Julián Martínez |
| 4 | DF | GAM | Yaya Bojang |
| 5 | MF | GHA | Sabit Abdulai |
| 6 | MF | CIV | Davy Gui |
| 7 | MF | ANG | André Vidigal |
| 8 | MF | POR | Vasco Moreira |
| 9 | FW | POR | Vivaldo Semedo (on loan from Watford) |
| 10 | FW | POR | Chiquinho |
| 11 | MF | BEL | Cédric Nuozzi |
| 12 | DF | NGR | Isaac James |
| 14 | DF | FRA | Steven Baseya |
| 15 | DF | BEL | Ikker Julian |
| 17 | FW | LBN | Samy Merheg |
| 18 | MF | MAR | Zakaria Kassary (on loan from UTS Rabat) |
| 19 | FW | MTN | Dawda Camara |

| No. | Pos. | Nation | Player |
|---|---|---|---|
| 20 | DF | POR | Diogo Spencer |
| 21 | DF | ESP | Sergi Gómez |
| 22 | FW | BRA | Figueiredo |
| 23 | GK | POR | André Paulo |
| 24 | DF | ENG | Mofe Jemide |
| 25 | MF | BRA | Ian Luccas |
| 26 | MF | BRA | Matheus França (on loan from Crystal Palace) |
| 27 | DF | ESP | Toni Tamarit |
| 31 | GK | BRA | Matheus Mendes |
| 33 | DF | FRA | Bastien Meupiyou |
| 35 | MF | BRA | Rayan Lucas |
| 55 | DF | POR | Francisco Chissumba (on loan from Braga) |
| 77 | DF | ESP | Óscar Torrellas |
| 90 | MF | POR | Tiago Octávio |
| 91 | GK | BRA | Jhonatan |
| 93 | MF | BRA | Zé Rafael |

=== Out on loan ===
Note: Flags indicate national team as defined under FIFA eligibility rules; some limited exceptions apply. Players may hold more than one non-FIFA nationality.

| No. | Pos. | Nation | Player |
|---|---|---|---|
| — | MF | COL | Gian Cabezas (at Athletic until 31 December 2026) |
| — | MF | MTN | Abderrahmane Soumaré (at União de Santarém until 30 June 2027) |
| — | FW | BRA | Léo Chú (at Avaí until 30 June 2027) |

| No. | Pos. | Nation | Player |
|---|---|---|---|
| — | FW | CIV | Stéphane Diarra (at União de Santarém until 30 June 2027) |
| — | FW | BRA | Felipe Lima (at Benfica B until 30 June 2027) |

== Honours ==
- Liga Portugal 2
  - Runners-up (1): 2024–25
- Liga 3
  - Champions (1): 2023–24

== League and cup history ==
| Season | | Pos. | Pl. | W | D | L | GS | GA | P | Cup | Notes |
|---|---|---|---|---|---|---|---|---|---|---|---|
| 1995–96 | 2H | 13 | 34 | 12 | 8 | 14 | 28 | 38 | 44 | | |
| 1996–97 | 2H | 15 | 34 | 9 | 13 | 12 | 31 | 30 | 40 | | |
| 1997–98 | 2H | 3 | 34 | 19 | 5 | 10 | 64 | 35 | 62 | | Promoted |
| 1998–99 | 1D | 15 | 34 | 8 | 11 | 15 | 36 | 50 | 35 | last 16 | |
| 1999–00 | 1D | 11 | 34 | 11 | 8 | 15 | 39 | 48 | 41 | | |
| 2000–01 | 1D | 12 | 34 | 12 | 7 | 15 | 45 | 52 | 43 | | |
| 2001–02 | 1D | 18 | 34 | 7 | 6 | 21 | 39 | 67 | 27 | | Relegated |
| 2002–03 | 2H | 2 | 34 | 16 | 12 | 6 | 47 | 24 | 60 | | Promoted |
| 2003–04 | 1D | 16 | 34 | 10 | 5 | 19 | 33 | 49 | 35 | | Relegated |
| 2004–05 | 2H | 13 | 34 | 11 | 6 | 17 | 26 | 38 | 39 | | Folded |
