= 2025–26 S.L. Benfica season =

Benfica
2025–26 season
- President: Rui Costa
- Head coach: Bruno Lage (until 16 September); José Mourinho (from 18 September)
- Stadium: Estádio da Luz
- Primeira Liga: 3rd
- Taça de Portugal: Quarter-finals
- Taça da Liga: Semi-finals
- Supertaça Cândido de Oliveira: Winners
- UEFA Champions League: Knockout phase play-offs
- Top goalscorer: League: Vangelis Pavlidis (22); All: Vangelis Pavlidis (30)
- Highest home attendance: 66,387 v Real Madrid (17 February 2026)
- Lowest home attendance: 49,311 v Alverca (8 February 2026)
- Average home league attendance: 58,690
- Biggest win: Benfica 5–0 Arouca (25 Octobert 2025)
- Biggest defeat: Newcastle United 3–0 Benfica (21 October 2025)
Home colours	Away colours	Third colours

The 2025–26 Sport Lisboa e Benfica season was the club's 122nd season in existence and its 92nd consecutive season in the top flight of Portuguese football. Domestically, Benfica played in the Primeira Liga, and also competed in the Taça da Liga and Taça de Portugal. In Europe, Benfica played in the UEFA Champions League.

Benfica completed the season undefeated on May 16, 2026 but finished third. This marked the first time a team gone undefeated but not win the league twice.

== Players ==
=== First-team squad ===
Note: Flags indicate national team as defined under FIFA eligibility rules; some limited exceptions apply. Players may hold more than one non-FIFA nationality.

No.	Pos.	Nation	Player
1	GK	UKR	Anatoliy Trubin
4	DF	POR	António Silva (vice-captain)
5	MF	ARG	Enzo Barrenechea (on loan from Aston Villa)
6	DF	DEN	Alexander Bah
7	FW	POR	Bruma
8	MF	NOR	Fredrik Aursnes
9	FW	CRO	Franjo Ivanović
10	MF	UKR	Heorhiy Sudakov (on loan from Shakhtar Donetsk)
11	FW	BEL	Dodi Lukébakio
14	FW	GRE	Vangelis Pavlidis
15	DF	CPV	Sidny Lopes Cabral
16	MF	POR	Manu Silva
17	DF	BIH	Amar Dedić
18	MF	LUX	Leandro Barreiro
20	MF	COL	Richard Ríos

No.	Pos.	Nation	Player
21	FW	NOR	Andreas Schjelderup
24	GK	POR	Samuel Soares
25	FW	ARG	Gianluca Prestianni
26	DF	SWE	Samuel Dahl
27	FW	POR	Rafa Silva
30	DF	ARG	Nicolás Otamendi (captain)
39	FW	POR	Henrique Araújo
44	DF	POR	Tomás Araújo
50	GK	POR	Diogo Ferreira
60	MF	POR	Nuno Félix
64	DF	POR	Gonçalo Oliveira
66	DF	USA	Joshua Wynder
68	MF	POR	João Veloso
84	MF	POR	João Rego
86	MF	POR	Diogo Prioste

== Transfers ==
=== In ===
No.	Pos	Player	Transferred from	Fee	Date	Source
Summer transfers
26	DF	(Sweden) Samuel Dahl	(Italy) Roma	€9,000,000	1 July 2025	
3	DF	(Spain) Rafael Obrador	(Spain) Real Madrid	€5,000,000	11 July 2025	
17	DF	(Bosnia and Herzegovina) Amar Dedić	(Austria) Red Bull Salzburg	€10,000,000	14 July 2025	
5	MF	(Argentina) Enzo Barrenechea	(England) Aston Villa	Loan (€3,000,000)	18 July 2025	
20	MF	(Colombia) Richard Ríos	(Brazil) Palmeiras	€27,000,000	22 July 2025	
9	FW	(Croatia) Franjo Ivanović	(Belgium) Union SG	€22,800,000	31 July 2025	
10	MF	(Ukraine) Heorhiy Sudakov	(Ukraine) Shakhtar Donetsk	Loan (€6,750,000)	30 August 2025	
11	FW	(Belgium) Dodi Lukébakio	(Spain) Sevilla	€20,000,000	1 September 2025	
Winter transfers
15	DF	(Cape Verde) Sidny Lopes Cabral	(Portugal) Estrela da Amadora	€6,000,000	30 December 2025	
27	FW	(Portugal) Rafa Silva	(Turkey) Beşiktaş	€5,000,000	22 January 2026	
Disclosed total
€114,550,000

=== Out ===
No.	Pos	Player	Transferred to	Fee	Date	Source
Summer transfers
20	MF	(Portugal) João Mário	(Turkey) Beşiktaş	€2,000,000	1 July 2025	
9	FW	(Brazil) Arthur Cabral	(Brazil) Botafogo	€12,000,000	1 July 2025	
11	FW	(Argentina) Ángel Di María	(Argentina) Rosario Central	Free	1 July 2025	
—	MF	(France) Soualiho Meïté	(Greece) PAOK	€1,000,000	1 July 2025	
—	DF	(Czech Republic) David Jurásek	(Turkey) Beşiktaş	Loan	1 July 2025	
10	MF	(Turkey) Orkun Kökçü	(Turkey) Beşiktaş	Loan	12 July 2025	
81	DF	(Albania) Adrian Bajrami	(Switzerland) Luzern	Loan	14 July 2025	
3	DF	(Spain) Álvaro Carreras	(Spain) Real Madrid	€50,000,000	14 July 2025	
—	FW	(Denmark) Casper Tengstedt	(Netherlands) Feyenoord	€6,000,000	24 July 2025	
—	MF	(Portugal) Martim Neto	(Spain) Elche	€1,500,000	30 July 2025	
7	FW	(Turkey) Kerem Aktürkoğlu	(Turkey) Fenerbahçe	€22,500,000	29 August 2025	
47	FW	(Portugal) Tiago Gouveia	(France) Nice	Loan	31 August 2025	
61	MF	(Portugal) Florentino	(England) Burnley	Loan (€2,000,000)	1 September 2025	
Winter transfers
—	DF	(Albania) Adrian Bajrami	(Switzerland) Luzern	€900,000	1 January 2026	
—	DF	(Czech Republic) David Jurásek	(Czech Republic) Slavia Prague	€3,000,000	12 January 2026	
3	DF	(Spain) Rafael Obrador	(Italy) Torino	Loan	19 January 2026	
71	DF	(Portugal) Leandro Santos	(Portugal) Moreirense	€800,000	23 January 2026	
Disclosed total
€101,700,000

== Pre-season friendlies ==
Win Draw Loss

The pre-season began on 14 July 2025.

26 July 2025 Eusébio Cup	Benfica	3–2	Fenerbahçe	Lisbon, Portugal
20:00 WEST (UTC+1)	Aktürkoğlu 37'; Brown 42' (o.g.); Araújo 81'	Report	Kahveci 45'; Amrabat (yellow card) 45+2'; En-Nesyri 60'	Stadium: Estádio da Luz; Attendance: 55,443; Referee: Hélder Carvalho (Portugal)

== Competitions ==
=== Overall record ===
Competition	First match	Last match	Starting round	Final position	Record							
Competition	First match	Last match	Starting round	Final position	Pld	W	D	L	GF	GA	GD	Win %
Primeira Liga	16 August 2025	16 May 2026	Matchday 1	3rd	34	23	11	0	74	25	+49	67.65
Taça de Portugal	17 October 2025	14 January 2026	Third round	Quarter-finals	4	3	0	1	6	1	+5	75.00
Taça da Liga	29 October 2025	7 January 2026	Quarter-finals	Semi-finals	2	1	0	1	4	3	+1	50.00
Supertaça Cândido de Oliveira	31 July 2025		Final	Winners	1	1	0	0	1	0	+1	100.00
UEFA Champions League	6 August 2025	25 February 2026	Third qualifying round	Knockout phase play-offs	14	6	1	7	16	15	+1	42.86
Total					55	34	12	9	101	44	+57	61.82

Source: Soccerway

=== Primeira Liga ===
==== League table ====
Pos	Team	Pld	W	D	L	GF	GA	GD	Pts	Qualification or relegation
1	Porto (C)	34	28	4	2	66	18	+48	88	Qualification for the Champions League league phase
2	Sporting CP	34	25	7	2	89	24	+65	82	Qualification for the Champions League league phase
3	Benfica	34	23	11	0	74	25	+49	80	Qualification for the Europa League second qualifying round
4	Braga	34	16	11	7	64	36	+28	59	Qualification for the Conference League second qualifying round
5	Famalicão	34	15	11	8	42	29	+13	56	

Source: Liga Portugal
Rules for classification: 1) Points; 2) Head-to-head points; 3) Head-to-head goal difference; 4) Goal difference; 5) Matches won; 6) Goals scored; 7) Play-off.
(C) Champions

==== Results summary ====
Overall								Home						Away					
Pld	W	D	L	GF	GA	GD	Pts	W	D	L	GF	GA	GD	W	D	L	GF	GA	GD
34	23	11	0	74	25	+49	80	11	6	0	41	13	+28	12	5	0	33	12	+21

Source: Liga Portugal

==== Results by round ====
Round	2	3	4	5	6	1^{1}	7	8	9	10	11	12	13	14	15	16	17	18	19	20	21	22	23	24	25	26	27	28	29	30	31	32	33	34
Ground	A	H	A	H	A	H	H	A	H	A	H	A	H	A	H	A	H	A	H	A	H	A	H	A	H	A	H	A	H	A	H	A	H	A
Result	W	W	W	D	W	D	W	D	W	W	D	W	D	W	W	D	W	W	W	D	W	W	W	W	D	W	W	D	W	W	W	D	D	W
Position	6	6	4	4	3	3	3	3	3	3	3	3	3	3	3	3	3	3	3	3	3	3	3	3	3	3	3	3	3	2	2	2	3	3
Points	3	6	9	10	13	14	17	18	21	24	25	28	29	32	35	36	39	42	45	46	49	52	55	58	59	62	65	66	69	72	75	76	77	80

Source: Liga Portugal
A = Away; H = Home; W = Win; D = Draw; L = Loss
Notes:
- Positions show the situation at the end of the corresponding Game Weeks (GW), not the position at the conclusion of matches or game days.

^{1} Matchday 1 (vs Rio Ave) was postponed to 23 September 2025.

==== Matches ====
16 August 2025 2	Estrela da Amadora	0–1	Benfica	Amadora
20:30 WEST (UTC+1)	Gastão (yellow card) 25'; Chernev (yellow card) 58'; Pinho (yellow card) 90+6'	Report	Otamendi (yellow card) 53'; Pavlidis 60' (pen.); Barrenechea (yellow card) 63'; Ríos (yellow card) 84'	Stadium: Estádio José Gomes; Attendance: 6,249; Referee: Hélder Carvalho (Santarém)

23 August 2025 3	Benfica	3–0	Tondela	Lisbon
20:30 WEST (UTC+1)	Otamendi (yellow card) 25'; Ivanović 31'; Aursnes 42'; Barrenechea (yellow card) 62'; Prestianni 90+6'	Report	Miro (yellow card) 34'; Manso (yellow card) 84'	Stadium: Estádio da Luz; Attendance: 61,229; Referee: Anzhony Rodrigues (Madeira)

31 August 2025 4	Alverca	1–2	Benfica	Alverca do Ribatejo
18:00 WEST (UTC+1)	James (yellow card) 29'; Abdulai (yellow card) 60'; Lincoln (yellow card) 81'; Touaizi (yellow card) 81'; Gui 85'	Report	Schjelderup 5'; Dedić 44' (yellow card) 18' (yellow-red card) 70'; Ríos (yellow card) 46'; Otamendi (yellow card) 59'; Soares (yellow card) 85'; Barrenechea (yellow card) 89'	Stadium: Complexo Desportivo FC Alverca; Attendance: 6,532; Referee: José Bessa (Porto)

12 September 2025 5	Benfica	1–1	Santa Clara	Lisbon
20:15 WEST (UTC+1)	Barrenechea (yellow card) 58'; Pavlidis 59'	Report	Silva (yellow card) 21'; Victor (red card) 34'; Lopes 90+2'	Stadium: Estádio da Luz; Attendance: 59,507; Referee: João Pinheiro (Braga)

20 September 2025 6	AVS	0–3	Benfica	Vila das Aves
18:00 WEST (UTC+1)	Bertelli (yellow card) 40'	Report	A. Silva (yellow card) 29'; Sudakov 45+3'; Pavlidis 59' (pen.); Ivanović 64'	Stadium: Estádio do CD Aves; Attendance: 5,416; Referee: Bruno Costa (Viana do Castelo)

23 September 2025 1	Benfica	1–1	Rio Ave	Lisbon
20:15 WEST (UTC+1)	Ivanović (yellow card) 10'; Dahl (yellow card) 57'; Sudakov 86'; Barrenechea (yellow card) 90+6'	Report	Brabec (yellow card) 55'; Miszta (yellow card) 60'; Clayton (yellow card) 90'; Luiz 90+1'	Stadium: Estádio da Luz; Attendance: 57,059; Referee: Sérgio Guelho (Guarda)

26 September 2025 7	Benfica	2–1	Gil Vicente	Lisbon
20:15 WEST (UTC+1)	Pavlidis 18', 26' (pen.); Dedić (yellow card) 65'; Otamendi (yellow card) 75'; Ríos (yellow card) 90'	Report	Esteves 11' (yellow card) 51'; Elimbi (yellow card) 56'; Santos (yellow card) 90+4' (yellow-red card) 90+9'	Stadium: Estádio da Luz; Attendance: 57,358; Referee: João Gonçalves (Porto)

5 October 2025 8	Porto	0–0	Benfica	Porto
21:15 WEST (UTC+1)	Bednarek (yellow card) 48'; Pepê (yellow card) 62'; Varela (yellow card) 77'; Rosario (yellow card) 80'; Moura (yellow card) 90+5'; Sainz (yellow card) 90+6'	Report	Ríos (yellow card) 45'; Dedić (yellow card) 90+6'	Stadium: Estádio do Dragão; Attendance: 49,520; Referee: Miguel Nogueira (Lisbon)

25 October 2025 9	Benfica	5–0	Arouca	Lisbon
20:30 WEST (UTC+1)	Pavlidis 9' (pen.), 22' (pen.), 50'; Lukébakio (yellow card) 59'; Prestianni (yellow card) 62'; Otamendi 75'; Ivanović 90+3' (pen.)	Report	Esgaio (yellow card) 43'; Fayed (yellow card) 82'	Stadium: Estádio da Luz; Attendance: 60,322; Referee: Hélder Carvalho (Santarém)

1 November 2025 10	Vitória de Guimarães	0–3	Benfica	Guimarães
18:00 WET (UTC±0)	Maga (yellow card) 45+2'; Blanco (red card) 56'; Félix (yellow card) 89'	Report	Pavlidis (yellow card) 43'; Sudakov (yellow card) 45+1'; Prestianni (yellow card) 45+2'; Araújo 53'; Dahl 62'; Rego 87'; Otamendi (yellow card) 90'	Stadium: Estádio D. Afonso Henriques; Attendance: 26,127; Referee: João Pinheiro (Braga)

9 November 2025 11	Benfica	2–2	Casa Pia	Lisbon
20:30 WET (UTC±0)	Sudakov 17' (yellow card) 53'; Pavlidis 60' (pen.); Silva (yellow card) 63'; Ríos (yellow card) 87'	Report	Sousa (yellow card) 13'; Araújo 65' (o.g.); Nhaga 90+1'; Sequeira (yellow card) 90+6'	Stadium: Estádio da Luz; Attendance: 56,428; Referee: Gustavo Correia (Porto)

29 November 2025 12	Nacional	1–2	Benfica	Funchal
18:00 WET (UTC±0)	Nourani (yellow card) 55'; Ramírez 60', (yellow card) 71'; Labidi (yellow card) 65'; Witi (yellow card) 90+5'	Report	Barrenechea (yellow card) 55'; Prestianni (yellow card) 84', (goal) 89'; Pavlidis 90+5'	Stadium: Estádio da Madeira; Attendance: 4,826; Referee: Iancu Vasilica (Vila Real)

5 December 2025 13	Benfica	1–1	Sporting CP	Lisbon
20:15 WET (UTC±0)	Sudakov 27'; Barreiro (yellow card) 56'; Pavlidis (yellow card) 66'; Prestianni (red card) 90+2'	Report	Gonçalves 12' (yellow card) 77'; Morita (yellow card) 30'; Suárez (yellow card) 65'; Fresneda (yellow card) 72'; Araújo (yellow card) 75'	Stadium: Estádio da Luz; Attendance: 65,247; Referee: António Nobre (Leiria)

14 December 2025 14	Moreirense	0–4	Benfica	Moreira de Cónegos
18:00 WET (UTC±0)	Stjepanović (yellow card) 29'; Sousa (yellow card) 33'	Report	Pavlidis 36', 57', 70'; Aursnes 76'	Stadium: Parque de Jogos Comendador Joaquim de Almeida Freitas; Attendance: 5,518; Referee: Hélder Carvalho (Santarém)

22 December 2025 15	Benfica	1–0	Famalicão	Lisbon
20:45 WET (UTC±0)	Pavlidis 34' (pen.)	Report	de Haas (yellow card) 34'	Stadium: Estádio da Luz; Attendance: 57,894; Referee: André Narciso (Setúbal)

28 December 2025 16	Braga	2–2	Benfica	Braga
18:00 WET (UTC±0)	Moutinho (yellow card) 30'; Zalazar 38' (pen.); Víctor 45+1'; Horta (yellow card) 65' (yellow-red card) 90+3'; Moscardo (yellow card) 88'	Report	Araújo (yellow card) 15'; Otamendi 29'; Aursnes 53'; Ríos (yellow card) 74'	Stadium: Estádio Municipal de Braga; Attendance: 24,314; Referee: João Gonçalves (Porto)

3 January 2026 17	Benfica	3–1	Estoril	Lisbon
18:00 WET (UTC±0)	Pavlidis 34' (pen.), 45+1', 80'	Report	João Carvalho 45+3'; Bacher (yellow card) 69'; Parente (yellow card) 87'	Stadium: Estádio da Luz; Attendance: 59,865; Referee: Anzhony Rodrigues (Madeira)

17 January 2026 18	Rio Ave	0–2	Benfica	Vila do Conde
20:30 WET (UTC±0)	Ntoi (yellow card) 66'	Report	Barreiro 16'; Ntoi 25' (o.g.); Schjelderup (yellow card) 59'; Dahl (yellow card) 90+1'	Stadium: Estádio dos Arcos; Attendance: 4,435; Referee: Cláudio Pereira (Aveiro)

25 January 2026 19	Benfica	4–0	Estrela da Amadora	Lisbon
18:00 WET (UTC±0)	Barrenechea (yellow card) 37'; Pavlidis 42', 55' (pen.); Silva (yellow card) 45'; Aursnes (yellow card) 45'; Lopes Cabral 58'; Cabral 84'	Report	Jansson (yellow card) 15'; Stoica (yellow card) 33'; Encada (yellow card) 52'; Moreira (yellow card) 76'	Stadium: Estádio da Luz; Attendance: 54,548; Referee: David Silva (Porto)

1 February 2026 20	Tondela	0–0	Benfica	Tondela
20:30 WET (UTC±0)	Sithole (yellow card) 36'; Maviram (yellow card) 42'; Marques (yellow card) 60'; Conceição (yellow card) 80'	Report		Stadium: Estádio João Cardoso; Attendance: 4,568; Referee: Luís Godinho (Évora)

8 February 2026 21	Benfica	2–1	Alverca	Lisbon
20:30 WET (UTC±0)	Schjelderup 16'; Lopes Cabral (yellow card) 23'; Prestianni (yellow card) 67'; Cabral 86'; Araújo (yellow card) 90+7'	Report	Lincoln (yellow card) 8'; Figueiredo 30'; Mendes (yellow card) 39'	Stadium: Estádio da Luz; Attendance: 49,311; Referee: Bruno Costa (Viana do Castelo)

13 February 2026 22	Santa Clara	1–2	Benfica	Ponta Delgada
18:30 WET (UTC±0)	Lopes (yellow card) 45'; Paciência 47' (yellow card) 59'; Soares (yellow card) 66' (yellow-red card) 90+2'; Venâncio (yellow card) 78'; Tavares (yellow card) 84'	Report	Pavlidis 16'; Victor 38' (o.g.); Prestianni (yellow card) 90'; Araújo (yellow card) 90+1'	Stadium: Estádio de São Miguel; Attendance: 7,184; Referee: António Nobre (Leiria)

21 February 2026 23	Benfica	3–0	AVS	Lisbon
18:00 WET (UTC±0)	Bah 11'; Barrenechea 30'; Rafa 43'	Report		Stadium: Estádio da Luz; Attendance: 58,784; Referee: Miguel Fonseca (Porto)

2 March 2026 24	Gil Vicente	1–2	Benfica	Barcelos
20:15 WET (UTC±0)	Hernández 52'; Cáseres (yellow card) 57'; Elimbi (yellow card) 87'	Report	A. Silva 35'; Otamendi (yellow card) 39'; Schjelderup 73' (yellow card) 76'; Bah (yellow card) 90+1'	Stadium: Estádio Cidade de Barcelos; Attendance: 11,022; Referee: João Gonçalves (Porto)

8 March 2026 25	Benfica	2–2	Porto	Lisbon
18:00 WET (UTC±0)	Otamendi (yellow card) 35'; Schjelderup 69'; Barreiro 88'; Silva (yellow card) 90+7'	Report	Froholdt 10'; Pepê (yellow card) 26'; Veiga (yellow card) 35'; Pietuszewski 40'; D. Costa (yellow card) 45+5'; Fernandes (yellow card) 58'; A. Costa (yellow card) 78'; Gomes (yellow card) 81'	Stadium: Estádio da Luz; Attendance: 66,366; Referee: João Pinheiro (Braga)

14 March 2026 26	Arouca	1–2	Benfica	Arouca
20:30 WET (UTC±0)	Barbero 7' (pen.) (yellow card) 45+3'; Sánchez (yellow card) 22'; Lee (yellow card) 48'; Gozálbez (yellow card) 77'; de Arruabarrena (yellow card) 80'; Trezza (red card) 90+8'	Report	Ríos 50' (yellow card) 59'; Silva (yellow card) 59'; Ivanović 90+6'; Dedić (red card) 90+8'; Pavlidis (yellow card) 90+9'; Trubin (yellow card) 90+11'; Prestianni (yellow card) 90+11'	Stadium: Estádio Municipal de Arouca; Attendance: 4,428; Referee: José Bessa (Porto)

21 March 2026 27	Benfica	3–0	Vitória de Guimarães	Lisbon
18:00 WET (UTC±0)	Prestianni 15'; Pavlidis 55'; Beni 74' (o.g.)	Report	(yellow card) 69' G. Silva	Stadium: Estádio da Luz; Attendance: 60,634; Referee: Luís Godinho (Évora)

6 April 2026 28	Casa Pia	1–1	Benfica	Rio Maior
20:45 WEST (UTC+1)	Brito 78'; Sequeira (yellow card) 85'	Report	Ríos 68'	Stadium: Estádio Municipal de Rio Maior; Attendance: 6,113; Referee: Hélder Carvalho (Santarém)

12 April 2026 29	Benfica	2–0	Nacional	Lisbon
18:00 WEST (UTC+1)	Schjelderup 3'; R. Silva 14'; Dahl (yellow card) 22'; Pavlidis (penalty missed) 58'	Report	Witi (yellow card) 50'; Santos (yellow card) 56'; Dias (yellow card) 58'; Silva (yellow card) 90'; Vallier (yellow card) 90+4'	Stadium: Estádio da Luz; Attendance: 56,594; Referee: Fábio Veríssimo (Leiria)

19 April 2026 30	Sporting CP	1–2	Benfica	Lisbon
18:00 WEST (UTC+1)	Suaréz (penalty missed) 19'; Hjulmand (yellow card) 36'; Silva (yellow card) 53'; Morita 72'	Report	Schjelderup 27' (pen.); Trubin (yellow card) 75'; R. Silva 90+3'	Stadium: Estádio José Alvalade; Attendance: 51,470; Referee: João Pinheiro (Braga)

25 April 2026 31	Benfica	4–1	Moreirense	Lisbon
18:00 WEST (UTC+1)	Barreiro 2'; Ríos 29' (yellow card) 41'; Aursnes (yellow card) 32'; Ivanović 89', 90+2'	Report	Travassos 26'; Assis (yellow card) 40'; Fabiano (yellow card) 60'	Stadium: Estádio da Luz; Attendance: 56,591; Referee: Iancu Vasilica (Vila Real)

2 May 2026 32	Famalicão	2–2	Benfica	Vila Nova de Famalicão
18:00 WEST (UTC+1)	De Amorim 67'; Sá (yellow card) 73'; Abubakar 78'; Pinheiro (yellow card) 83'	Report	13' (pen.) Schjelderup; 19' (yellow card) 90+12' Ríos; (red card) 53' Otamendi; (yellow card) 90+9' Trubin	Stadium: Estádio Municipal 22 de Junho; Attendance: 4,940; Referee: Gustavo Correia (Porto)

11 May 2026 33	Benfica	2–2	Braga	Lisbon
20:15 WEST (UTC+1)	Rafa 46'; Dedic (yellow card) 87'; Pavlidis 90+5' (pen.)	Report	Victor 48'; Lelo (yellow card) 56'; Hornicek (yellow card) 56'; Gorby 88'; Carvalho (yellow card) 90+1'; Gómez (yellow card) 90+6'	Stadium: Estádio da Luz; Attendance: 60,001; Referee: João Pinheiro (Braga)

16 May 2026 34	Estoril	1–3	Benfica	Estoril
20:30 WEST (UTC+1)	Costa (yellow card) 22'; André (yellow card) 52'; Guitane (yellow card) 66'; Peixinho 90+1'	Report	Ríos 7'; Bah 14' (yellow card) 47'; Rafa 16'; Prestianni (yellow card) 68'	Stadium: Estádio António Coimbra da Mota; Attendance: 4,703; Referee: Miguel Nogueira (Lisbon)

=== Taça de Portugal ===
17 October 2025 Third round	Chaves	0–2	Benfica	Chaves
19:30 WEST (UTC+1)	Alves (yellow card) 42'; Rodrigues (yellow card) 68'	Report	Pavlidis 8', 79'; Rego (yellow card) 29'; Barrenechea (yellow card) 71'	Stadium: Estádio Municipal Eng. Manuel Branco Teixeira; Attendance: 8,112; Referee: David Silva (Porto)

21 November 2025 Fourth round	Atlético CP	0–2	Benfica	Lisbon
20:30 WET (UTC±0)	Almeida (yellow card) 44'; Délcio (yellow card) 52'; Paulinho (yellow card) 68'; Santana (yellow card) 68'; Henriques (yellow card) 90+2'	Report	Otamendi (yellow card) 37'; Ivanović (yellow card) 40'; Ríos 73'; Pavlidis 77' (pen.); Dedić (yellow card) 87'	Stadium: Estádio do Restelo; Attendance: 10,000; Referee: Fábio Veríssimo (Leiria)

17 December 2025 Fifth round	Farense	0–2	Benfica	Faro
20:45 WET (UTC±0)	Rafinha (yellow card) 29'; Romero (yellow card) 46'; Almeida (yellow card) 64'; Furtado (yellow card) 67'	Report	Ríos 11' (yellow card) 85'; Ivanović 56'; Prestianni (yellow card) 85'	Stadium: Estádio de São Luís; Attendance: 5,126; Referee: Hélder Malheiro (Lisbon)

14 January 2026 Quarter-finals	Porto	1–0	Benfica	Porto
20:45 WET (UTC±0)	Bednarek 15' (yellow card) 45+7'; Aghehowa (yellow card) 45+4'; Pepê (yellow card) 68'; Veiga (yellow card) 83'; Mora (yellow card) 85'	Report	Ríos (yellow card) 39'; Dedić (yellow card) 45+3'; Pavlidis (yellow card) 45+8'; Araújo (yellow card) 68'; Prestianni (yellow card) 90'; Barreiro (yellow card) 90+7'	Stadium: Estádio do Dragão; Attendance: 47,374; Referee: Fábio Veríssimo (Leiria)

=== Taça da Liga ===
29 October 2025 Quarter-finals	Benfica	3–0	Tondela	Lisbon
20:45 WET (UTC+00:00)	Otamendi 41' (pen.); Lukébakio 83'; Ríos (yellow card) 86'; Pavlidis 90+5'	Report	Medina (yellow card) 23'; Manso (yellow card) 60'	Stadium: Estádio da Luz; Attendance: 50,314; Referee: Carlos Macedo (Braga)

7 January 2026 Semi-finals	Benfica	1–3	Braga	Leiria
20:00 WET (UTC+00:00)	Otamendi (yellow card) 11' (yellow-red card) 89'; Pavlidis 64' (pen.); Prestianni (yellow card) 69'	Report	Víctor 19'; Horníček (yellow card) 32'; Zalazar 33'; Carvalho (yellow card) 48'; Lagerbielke (yellow card) 72' (goal) 81'; Navarro (yellow card) 78'	Stadium: Estádio Dr. Magalhães Pessoa; Attendance: 17,469; Referee: João Pinheiro (Braga)

=== Supertaça Cândido de Oliveira ===
31 July 2025 Final	Sporting CP	0–1	Benfica	Faro/Loulé
20:45 WEST (UTC+1)	Diomande (yellow card) 29'; Gonçalves (yellow card) 53'; Hjulmand (yellow card) 81'; Suárez (yellow card) 90+6'; St. Juste (yellow card) 90+7'	Report	Dedić (yellow card) 23'; Pavlidis 50'; Otamendi (yellow card) 73'; A. Silva (yellow card) 90+1'; Trubin (yellow card) 90+6'; Veloso (yellow card) 90+9'; Prestianni (yellow card) 90+9'	Stadium: Estádio Algarve; Attendance: 19,354; Referee: Fábio Veríssimo (Leiria)

=== UEFA Champions League ===
==== Third qualifying round ====
The draw for the third qualifying round was held on 21 July 2025.

6 August 2025 First leg	Nice (France)	0–2	(Portugal) Benfica	Nice, France
21:00 CEST (UTC+2)	Bah (yellow card) 30'; Louchet (yellow card) 79'; Mendy (yellow card) 85'	Report	Schjelderup (yellow card) 33'; Ivanović 53'; Florentino 88'	Stadium: Allianz Riviera; Attendance: 26,443; Referee: Michael Oliver (England)

12 August 2025 Second leg	Benfica (Portugal)	2–0 (4–0 agg.)	(France) Nice	Lisbon, Portugal
20:00 WEST (UTC+1)	Aursnes 19'; Schjelderup 27'; Prestianni (yellow card) 90+2'	Report	Bah (yellow card) 33'; Clauss (yellow card) 65'	Stadium: Estádio da Luz; Attendance: 64,511; Referee: Marco Guida (Italy)

==== Play-off round ====
The draw for the play-off round was held on 4 August 2025.

20 August 2025 First leg	Fenerbahçe (Turkey)	0–0	(Portugal) Benfica	Istanbul, Turkey
22:00 TRT (UTC+3)	Durán (yellow card) 27'; Oosterwolde (yellow card) 90+2'; Kahveci (yellow card) 90+3'	Report	Barrenechea (yellow card) 22'; Ríos (yellow card) 63'; Florentino (yellow card) 69' (yellow-red card) 71'; Silva (yellow card) 90+3'	Stadium: Şükrü Saracoğlu Stadium; Attendance: 41,258; Referee: Daniel Siebert (Germany)

27 August 2025 Second leg	Benfica (Portugal)	1–0 (1–0 agg.)	(Turkey) Fenerbahçe	Lisbon, Portugal
20:00 WEST (UTC+1)	Aktürkoğlu 35'; Barreiro (yellow card) 70'; Silva (yellow card) 85'	Report	Ambrabat (yellow card) 30'; Talisca (yellow card) 79' (yellow-red card) 82'; Söyüncü (yellow card) 87'	Stadium: Estádio da Luz; Attendance: 64,323; Referee: Slavko Vinčić (Slovenia)

==== League phase ====
The league phase draw was held on 28 August 2025.

===== League table =====
Pos	Team	Pld	W	D	L	GF	GA	GD	Pts	Qualification
22	(Association of Football Federations of Azerbaijan) Qarabağ	8	3	1	4	13	21	−8	10	Advance to knockout phase play-offs (unseeded)
23	(Norwegian Football Federation) Bodø/Glimt	8	2	3	3	14	15	−1	9	Advance to knockout phase play-offs (unseeded)
24	(Portuguese Football Federation) Benfica	8	3	0	5	10	12	−2	9	Advance to knockout phase play-offs (unseeded)
25	(French Football Federation) Marseille	8	3	0	5	11	14	−3	9	
26	(Cyprus Football Association) Pafos	8	2	3	3	8	11	−3	9	

Source: UEFA
Rules for classification: League phase tiebreakers

===== Results by round =====
Round	1	2	3	4	5	6	7	8
Ground	H	A	A	H	A	H	A	H
Result	L	L	L	L	W	W	L	W
Position	24	33	35	35	30	25	29	24
Points	0	0	0	0	3	6	6	9

Source: UEFA
A = Away; H = Home; W = Win; D = Draw; L = Loss

===== Matches =====
16 September 2025 1	Benfica (Portugal)	2–3	(Azerbaijan) Qarabağ	Lisbon, Portugal
20:00 WEST (UTC+01:00)	Barrenechea 6'; Pavlidis 16'	Report	Andrade 30'; Durán 48'; Kashchuk 86'	Stadium: Estádio da Luz; Attendance: 53,257; Referee: Erik Lambrechts (Belgium)

30 September 2025 2	Chelsea (England)	1–0	(Portugal) Benfica	London, England
20:00 BST (UTC+01:00)	Ríos 18' (o.g.); Fernández (yellow card) 45+1'; Buonanotte (yellow card) 46'; Pedro (yellow card) 62' (yellow-red card) 90+6'; Neto (yellow card) 88'	Report	Barrenechea (yellow card) 34'; Ríos (yellow card) 49'; Aursnes (yellow card) 63'; Otamendi (yellow card) 83'	Stadium: Stamford Bridge; Attendance: 38,636; Referee: Daniel Siebert (Germany)

21 October 2025 3	Newcastle United (England)	3–0	(Portugal) Benfica	Newcastle upon Tyne, England
20:00 BST (UTC+01:00)	Thiaw (yellow card) 17'; Gordon 32'; Barnes 70', 83'	Report	Lukébakio (yellow card) 45'	Stadium: St James' Park; Attendance: 52,073; Referee: Szymon Marciniak (Poland)

5 November 2025 4	Benfica (Portugal)	0–1	(Germany) Bayer Leverkusen	Lisbon, Portugal
20:00 WET (UTC+00:00)	Lukébakio (yellow card) 62'; Otamendi (yellow card) 78'; Ríos (yellow card) 90+1'	Report	Maza (yellow card) 41'; Tapsoba (yellow card) 55'; Schick 65'; Tillman (yellow card) 79'	Stadium: Estádio da Luz; Attendance: 55,796; Referee: Simone Sozza (Italy)

25 November 2025 5	Ajax (Netherlands)	0–2	(Portugal) Benfica	Amsterdam, Netherlands
18:45 CET (UTC+01:00)	Weghorst (yellow card) 69'	Report	Dahl 6' (yellow card) 74'; Barreiro 90'	Stadium: Johan Cruyff Arena; Attendance: 51,154; Referee: Sven Jablonski (Germany)

10 December 2025 6	Benfica (Portugal)	2–0	(Italy) Napoli	Lisbon, Portugal
20:00 WET (UTC+00:00)	Ríos 20'; Barreiro 49'; Dedić (yellow card) 78'	Report	Lang (yellow card) 52'; Vergara (yellow card) 87'	Stadium: Estádio da Luz; Attendance: 54,353; Referee: Slavko Vinčić (Slovenia)

21 January 2026 7	Juventus (Italy)	2–0	(Portugal) Benfica	Turin, Italy
21:00 CET (UTC+01:00)	Locatelli (yellow card) 49'; Thuram 55'; McKennie 64'; Kelly (yellow card) 88'	Report	Pavlidis (penalty missed) 81'	Stadium: Juventus Stadium; Attendance: 41,626; Referee: Serdar Gözübüyük (Netherlands)

28 January 2026 8	Benfica (Portugal)	4–2	(Spain) Real Madrid	Lisbon, Portugal
20:00 WET (UTC+00:00)	Barreiro (yellow card) 10'; Schjelderup 36', 54'; Pavlidis 45+5' (pen.); Dahl (yellow card) 85'; Trubin 90+8'	Report	Tchouaméni (yellow card) 3'; Mbappé 30', 58'; Asencio (yellow card) 45+4' (yellow-red card) 90+2'; Huijsen (yellow card) 62'; Carreras (yellow card) 66'; Rodrygo (yellow card) 90+6' (yellow-red card) 90+7'	Stadium: Estádio da Luz; Attendance: 64,305; Referee: Davide Massa (Italy)

==== Knockout phase play-offs ====
The draw for the knockout phase play-offs was held on 30 January 2026.

17 February 2026 First leg	Benfica (Portugal)	0–1	(Spain) Real Madrid	Lisbon, Portugal
20:00 WET (UTC+00:00)	Prestianni (yellow card) 78'; Sudakov (yellow card) 90+2'	Report	Vinicius 50' (yellow card) 51'; Mbappé (yellow card) 87'	Stadium: Estádio da Luz; Attendance: 66,387; Referee: François Letexier (France)

25 February 2026 Second leg	Real Madrid (Spain)	2–1 (3–1 agg.)	(Portugal) Benfica	Madrid, Spain
21:00 CET (UTC+01:00)	Tchouaméni 16'; Asencio (yellow card) 57'; Vinícius 80'; Palacios (yellow card) 90+6'	Report	Silva 14'; Ríos (yellow card) 35'; Otamendi (yellow card) 51'	Stadium: Bernabéu; Attendance: 76,745; Referee: Slavko Vinčić (Slovenia)

== Statistics ==
=== Appearances and goals ===
No.	Pos	Nat	Player	Total		Primeira Liga		Taça de Portugal		Taça da Liga		Supertaça Cândido de Oliveira		Champions League	
No.	Pos	Nat	Player	Apps	Goals	Apps	Goals	Apps	Goals	Apps	Goals	Apps	Goals	Apps	Goals
Goalkeepers
1	GK	(Ukraine) UKR	Anatoliy Trubin	50	1	32	0	1+1	0	1	0	1	0	14	1
24	GK	(Portugal) POR	Samuel Soares	6	0	2	0	3	0	1	0	0	0	0	0
Defenders
4	DF	(Portugal) POR	António Silva	42	1	21+5	1	4	0	1	0	1	0	8+2	0
6	DF	(Denmark) DEN	Alexander Bah	9	2	6+3	2	0	0	0	0	0	0	0	0
15	DF	(Cape Verde) CPV	Sidny Lopes Cabral	12	1	3+5	1	1	0	0+1	0	0	0	0+2	0
17	DF	(Bosnia and Herzegovina) BIH	Amar Dedić	43	1	21+3	1	3	0	1	0	1	0	13+1	0
26	DF	(Sweden) SWE	Samuel Dahl	53	2	32+1	1	3+1	0	2	0	1	0	13	1
30	DF	(Argentina) ARG	Nicolás Otamendi	49	3	30	2	2	0	2	1	1	0	14	0
44	DF	(Portugal) POR	Tomás Araújo	37	1	18+4	1	4	0	1+1	0	0	0	7+2	0
58	DF	(Portugal) POR	Daniel Banjaqui	3	0	2	0	0+1	0	0	0	0	0	0	0
62	DF	(Portugal) POR	José Neto	3	0	1+1	0	0	0	0	0	0	0	0+1	0
Midfielders
5	MF	(Argentina) ARG	Enzo Barrenechea	43	2	21+5	1	2	0	1	0	1	0	10+3	1
8	MF	(Norway) NOR	Fredrik Aursnes	49	4	26+2	3	3+1	0	2	0	1	0	14	1
10	MF	(Ukraine) UKR	Heorhiy Sudakov	36	4	17+5	4	2+1	0	2	0	0	0	8+1	0
16	MF	(Portugal) POR	Manu Silva	12	0	1+8	0	1	0	1	0	0	0	0+1	0
18	MF	(Luxembourg) LUX	Leandro Barreiro	50	5	18+13	3	1+2	0	2	0	1	0	8+5	2
20	MF	(Colombia) COL	Richard Ríos	45	8	26+1	5	2+1	2	1+1	0	1	0	11+1	1
68	MF	(Portugal) POR	João Veloso	4	0	0+2	0	0+1	0	0	0	0+1	0	0	0
84	MF	(Portugal) POR	João Rego	14	1	0+8	1	2+1	0	0+1	0	0	0	0+2	0
88	MF	(Portugal) POR	Tiago Freitas	1	0	0	0	0	0	0	0	0	0	0+1	0
86	MF	(Portugal) POR	Diogo Prioste	2	0	0+2	0	0	0	0	0	0	0	0	0
Forwards
7	FW	(Portugal) POR	Bruma	3	0	0+3	0	0	0	0	0	0	0	0	0
9	FW	(Croatia) CRO	Franjo Ivanović	42	8	9+16	6	2+2	1	1+1	0	0	0	3+8	1
11	FW	(Belgium) BEL	Dodi Lukébakio	23	1	8+9	0	1	0	1	1	0	0	3+1	0
14	FW	(Greece) GRE	Vangelis Pavlidis	53	30	30+3	22	3	3	1+1	2	1	1	13+1	2
21	FW	(Norway) NOR	Andreas Schjelderup	43	10	20+8	7	1+3	0	1	0	0	0	7+3	3
25	FW	(Argentina) ARG	Gianluca Prestianni	50	3	26+12	3	2	0	0+2	0	0+1	0	3+4	0
27	FW	(Portugal) POR	Rafa Silva	18	6	11+5	5	0	0	0	0	0	0	2	1
39	FW	(Portugal) POR	Henrique Araújo	11	0	0+5	0	0+1	0	0	0	0+1	0	0+4	0
67	FW	(Portugal) POR	Rodrigo Rêgo	5	0	1+2	0	1	0	0	0	0	0	0+1	0
72	FW	(Portugal) POR	Anísio Cabral	6	2	0+6	2	0	0	0	0	0	0	0	0
77	FW	(Portugal) POR	Gonçalo Moreira	1	0	0+1	0	0	0	0	0	0	0	0	0
Players who made an appearance and/or had a squad number but left the team.
3	DF	(Spain) ESP	Rafael Obrador	1	0	1	0	0	0	0	0	0	0	0	0
7	FW	(Turkey) TUR	Kerem Aktürkoğlu	5	1	0+1	0	0	0	0	0	1	0	2+1	1
47	FW	(Portugal) POR	Tiago Gouveia	3	0	0+1	0	0	0	0	0	0+1	0	0+1	0
61	MF	(Portugal) POR	Florentino	7	1	0+3	0	0	0	0	0	0+1	0	1+2	1
71	DF	(Portugal) POR	Leandro Santos	0	0	0	0	0	0	0	0	0	0	0	0
90	FW	(Portugal) POR	Ivan Lima	2	0	0+1	0	0+1	0	0	0	0	0	0	0
