= Richard Ríos =

Colombian footballer (born 2000)

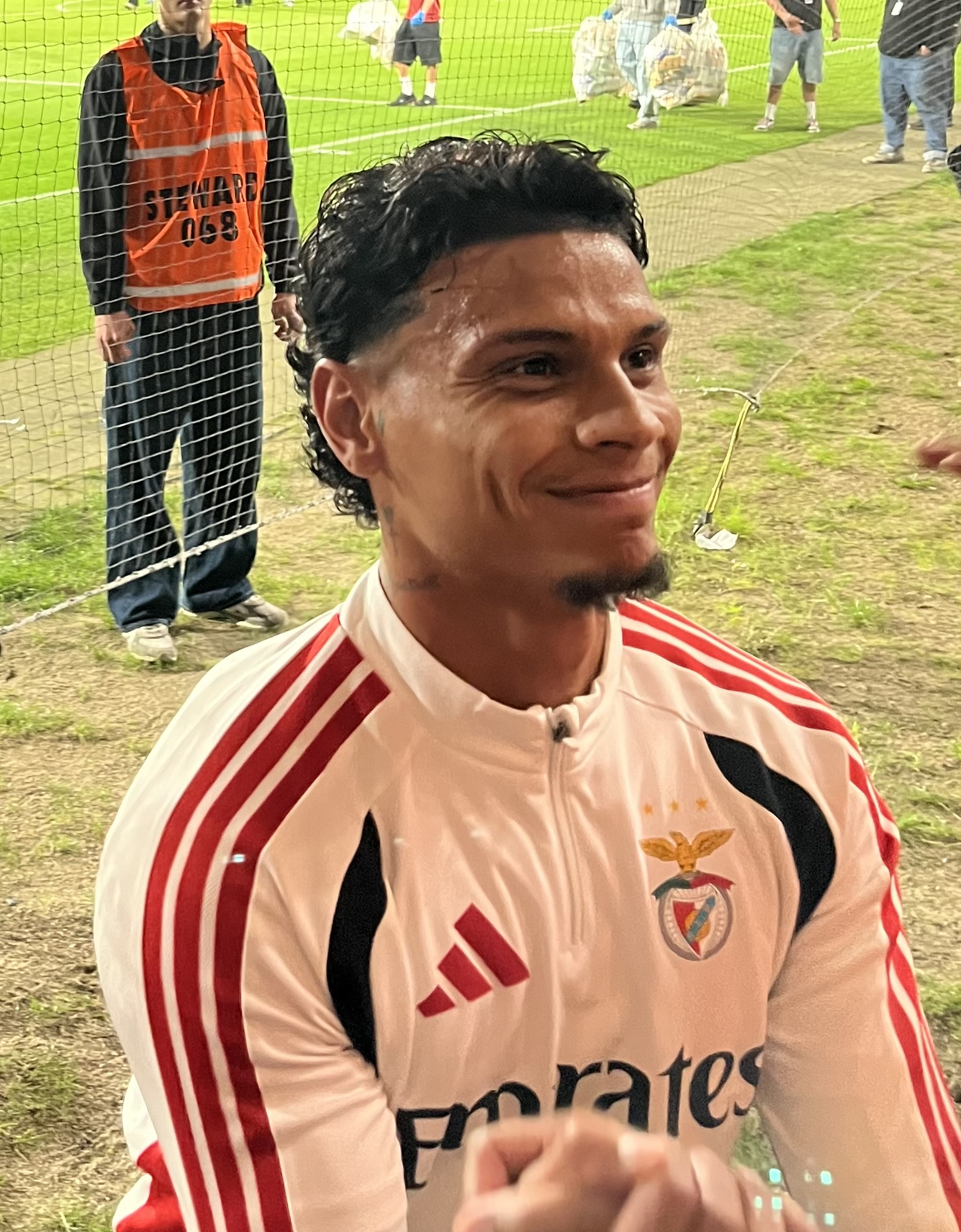
- Ríos with Benfica in 2026

Personal information
- Full name: Richard Ríos Montoya
- Date of birth: 2 June 2000 (age 26)
- Place of birth: Vegachí, Colombia
- Height: 1.85 m (6 ft 1 in)
- Position: Defensive midfielder

Team information
- Current team: Al-Ittihad (on loan from Benfica)
- Number: 5

Youth career
- 2017–2018: Alianza Platanera (futsal)
- 2019–2020: Flamengo

Senior career*
Years	Team	Apps	(Gls)
2020–2022	Flamengo	7	(0)
2021–2022	→ Mazatlán (loan)	6	(0)
2022–2023	Guarani	20	(3)
2023–2025	Palmeiras	99	(7)
2025–	Benfica	29	(5)
2026–	→ Al-Ittihad (loan)	6	(0)

International career^{‡}
2023–	Colombia	40	(2)
Medal record
Men's football
Representing Colombia
Copa América
Runner-up	2024 United States
- * Club domestic league appearances and goals as of 16:06, 30 October 2026 (UTC) ‡ National team caps and goals as of 6 October 2026 (UTC)

Richard Ríos Montoya (born 2 June 2000) is a Colombian professional footballer who plays as a central midfielder for Saudi Pro League club Al-Ittihad, on loan from Primeira Liga club Benfica, and the Colombia national team.

A former futsal player who represented Colombia at under-20 level in the sport, Ríos moved to Brazil in 2019 to join the youth ranks of Flamengo, despite having no experience in the eleven-a-side game. After a loan spell with Mazatlán that was cut short by a serious knee injury, he rebuilt his career with Guarani before joining Palmeiras in 2023. At Palmeiras he won the 2023 Campeonato Brasileiro Série A and the 2024 Campeonato Paulista, and made 138 appearances before joining Benfica in July 2025 for a €27 million fee, then the highest fixed fee the Portuguese club had paid for a player. He won the 2025 Supertaça Cândido de Oliveira on his competitive debut and scored in the UEFA Champions League in his first season, before joining Al-Ittihad on loan in September 2026.

Ríos made his senior international debut in 2023 and established himself as a starter at the 2024 Copa América, where he played in all six of Colombia's matches, completed more dribbles than any other player at the tournament, and scored in the quarter-final as Colombia finished as runners-up. He was part of Colombia's squad at the 2026 FIFA World Cup.

== Early life ==
Ríos was born on 2 June 2000 in Vegachí, a sugarcane-growing town in the Antioquia Department, and grew up in the Niquía area of Bello, near Medellín. He is the son of Neymar and Sandra, and has two older brothers; he has described his father, who ensured the family "never lacked anything", as his greatest example. The family had limited means: his coach at futsal club Alianza Platanera recalled that Ríos often ate at his home, and Ríos later said he watched World Cups at friends' houses because his family could not afford to.

After an unsuccessful start in eleven-a-side football, Ríos turned to futsal and became a professional in the sport at 16, playing for Real Antioquia and then Alianza Platanera, with whom he won the Liga Argos. He was selected for Colombia's squad at the 2018 CONMEBOL Under-20 Futsal Championship in Lima, where he played eight matches. Wearing the number 6, he scored and provided two assists as Colombia came from 2–0 down to beat Ecuador 3–2, and his performances at the tournament attracted the attention of Flamengo, who invited him for a trial. He moved to Brazil at 18, later recalling that he "left everything in Colombia" and arrived "with a backpack to fulfil the dream".

== Club career ==
=== Flamengo ===
After a two-month trial, Flamengo signed Ríos to their youth set-up in July 2019. His under-20 coach, Maurício Souza, later said Ríos arrived with "some futsal habits", such as over-dribbling around the penalty area, but described him as a powerful, box-to-box midfielder; he won several youth titles with the under-20 side.

At the start of the 2020 season, Ríos was promoted to a group of reserve and youth players used in the opening rounds of the 2020 Campeonato Carioca. He made his senior debut on 23 January 2020, coming on as a second-half substitute for Matheus Dantas in a 1–0 away win over Vasco da Gama. He made his Série A debut on 27 September 2020, replacing Guilherme Bala in a 1–1 away draw against Palmeiras at a time when Flamengo's squad had been depleted by a COVID-19 outbreak, playing on the wing, in midfield and at left-back during his 20 minutes on the pitch. The following day, his contract was extended until December 2021.

==== Mazatlán (loan) ====
On 21 June 2021, Ríos signed a contract extension with Flamengo until December 2023, and two days later joined Liga MX club Mazatlán on a one-year loan, becoming the club's first signing for the Apertura 2021. He made his debut on 26 July, replacing Alfonso Sánchez in a 2–0 away win over Cruz Azul. In September 2021, after five first-team appearances, he ruptured the anterior cruciate ligament of his right knee in training and was ruled out for six to eight months. He returned to action the following April, but in May 2022, after six appearances, Mazatlán declined to exercise the purchase option in his loan and he returned to Flamengo. Ríos later described the period after the injury as the worst of his life, saying he had felt "humiliated". Outside the plans of first-team coach Dorival Júnior on his return, he trained with Flamengo's under-15 and under-16 players.

=== Guarani ===
On 4 August 2022, Ríos left Flamengo and signed for Série B club Guarani on a contract until December 2023. He scored his first professional goal on 11 October, an 87th-minute header from a Jamerson cross that gave Guarani a 1–0 home win over CRB and all but secured the club's place in the division.

Ríos became a key player for Bugre in the 2023 Campeonato Paulista, scoring two goals, providing one assist and leading the competition in tackles and key passes. His performances drew interest from Corinthians, Internacional and Red Bull Bragantino, as well as Palmeiras.

=== Palmeiras ===
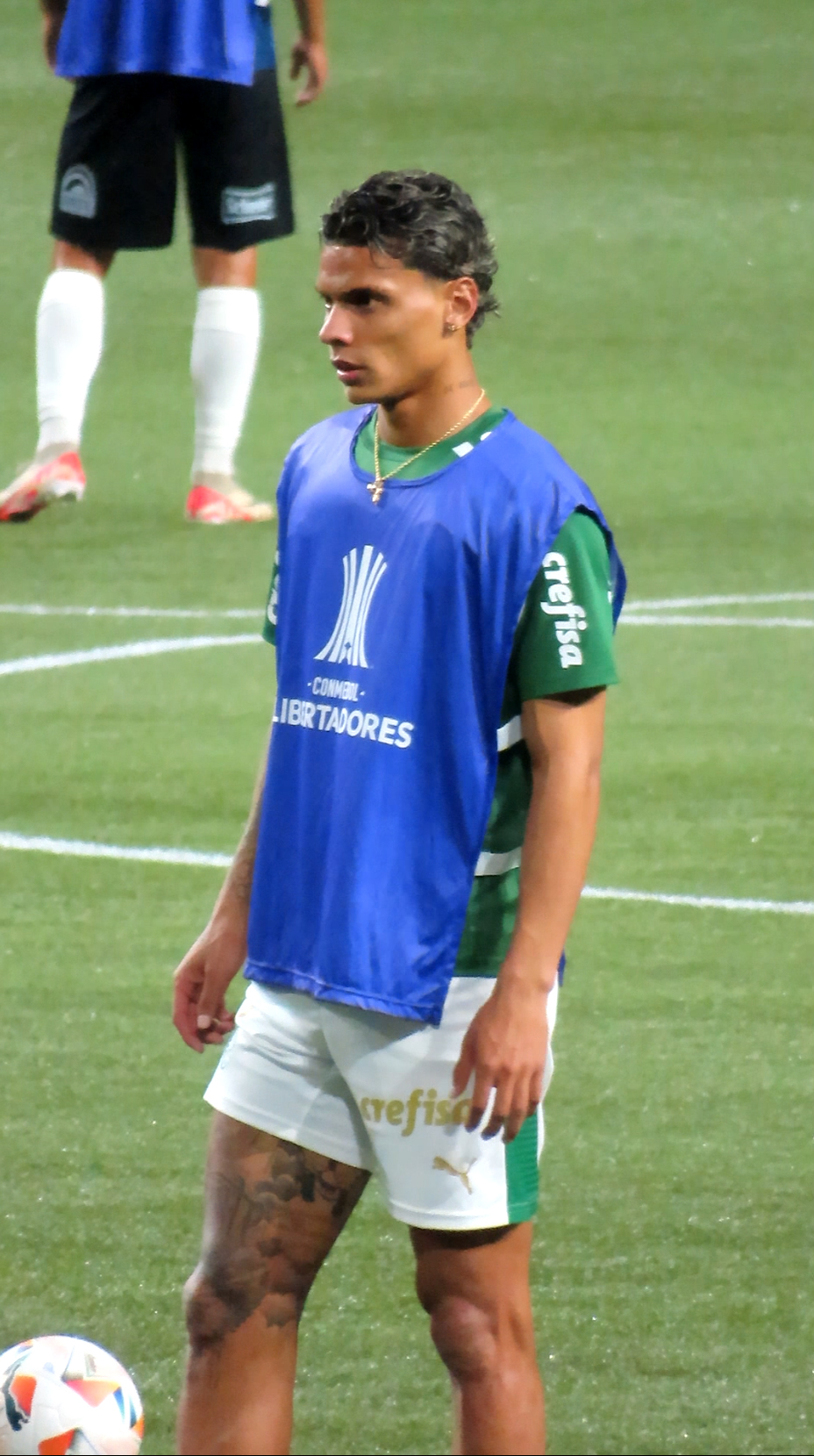
Ríos warming up for Palmeiras in 2024

==== 2023: Série A champion ====
On 28 March 2023, Ríos signed for Palmeiras on a contract until the end of 2025, with the option of a further year, becoming the tenth Colombian to play for the club. Palmeiras paid R$6 million for 60% of his economic rights. He made his first appearance as a substitute for Fabinho in a 3–1 defeat to Bolívar in La Paz in the 2023 Copa Libertadores on 5 April, and scored his first goal for the club in a 3–0 win over Fortaleza in the 2023 Copa do Brasil round of 16 in May.

Under manager Abel Ferreira, Ríos made 37 league appearances in the 2023 Série A, more than any other Palmeiras player, and 53 in all competitions. After Gabriel Menino fractured his ankle in October, Ríos started the club's last 11 matches of the season as Palmeiras won the league title. He finished the campaign with the highest dribble success rate in the league, completing 81% of his attempted dribbles.

==== 2024–25 ====
In January 2024, Palmeiras increased their share of Ríos's economic rights to 70%. On 7 April, he came on as a substitute in the second leg of the 2024 Campeonato Paulista final, as Palmeiras overturned a 1–0 first-leg deficit to beat Santos 2–0 and win a third consecutive state title. In September 2024, he signed a contract extension until December 2028.

Ríos was named in the Team of the Tournament for the 2025 Campeonato Paulista, in which Palmeiras finished as runners-up to Corinthians. By May, Palmeiras had set a €100 million release clause for him and, according to Ferreira, rejected an offer of €25–30 million.

At the 2025 FIFA Club World Cup in the United States, Ríos led all players in interceptions after four matches. In the round of 16 against Botafogo on 28 June, he started the move from which Paulinho scored the only goal in extra time. Palmeiras were eliminated by Chelsea in the quarter-finals. His performances at the tournament attracted offers from clubs including Nottingham Forest, Zenit and Roma. He left Palmeiras having made 138 appearances and scored 11 goals.

=== Benfica ===
==== 2025–26 season ====
On 22 July 2025, Ríos joined Benfica on a five-year contract for a fee of €27 million, with a €100 million release clause. The fee was the highest fixed amount Benfica had paid for a player. He took the number 20 shirt, and made his competitive debut on 31 July in the 2025 Supertaça Cândido de Oliveira, starting in a 1–0 win over Sporting at the Estádio Algarve and winning 13 of his 17 duels.

Ríos scored his first goal for Benfica in a 2–0 away win over Atlético CP in the Taça de Portugal in November 2025. On 10 December, under José Mourinho, he scored his first Champions League goal and assisted Leandro Barreiro in a 2–0 league-phase win over Napoli at the Estádio da Luz. He dislocated his left shoulder in a Taça de Portugal quarter-final against Porto on 14 January 2026, but returned for the knockout phase play-offs against Real Madrid, in which Benfica were eliminated. Benfica finished the league season unbeaten but third, and Ríos ended his first season with eight goals and six assists in 45 appearances, including five goals in 27 Primeira Liga matches.

==== Loan to Al-Ittihad ====
After six appearances at the start of the 2026–27 season under new coach Marco Silva, Ríos joined Saudi Pro League club Al-Ittihad on 2 September 2026 on a season-long loan. According to A Bola, Al-Ittihad paid a €3 million loan fee and took on his full salary, with no option to buy. He made his debut as a substitute in a 2–1 win over Al-Nassr on 5 September.

== International career ==
=== Futsal ===
Ríos represented Colombia at under-20 level in futsal, appearing eight times at the 2018 CONMEBOL Under-20 Futsal Championship in Lima, where Colombia finished fifth.

=== Senior team ===
Ríos received his first senior call-up from Néstor Lorenzo in September 2023, for World Cup qualifiers against Venezuela and Chile. He made his debut on 12 October 2023, replacing Mateus Uribe in the 67th minute of a 2–2 draw with Uruguay in Barranquilla. He scored his first international goal on 8 June 2024 in a 5–1 friendly win over the United States, dedicating it to his mother on her birthday.

At the 2024 Copa América in the United States, Ríos wore the number 6 shirt and played in all six of Colombia's matches. On 6 July, he scored Colombia's fourth goal with a low shot from outside the area in a 5–0 quarter-final win over Panama. Despite an injury sustained in the semi-final, he started alongside Jefferson Lerma in the final against Argentina, which Colombia lost 1–0 after extra time. Ríos completed 18 dribbles over the course of the tournament, more than any other player.

On 25 May 2026, Ríos was named in Lorenzo's 26-man squad for the 2026 FIFA World Cup. He made his World Cup debut on 17 June, replacing Gustavo Puerta in the 80th minute of a 3–1 win over Uzbekistan in Mexico City, and appeared as a substitute in all five of Colombia's matches as they reached the round of 16, where they were eliminated on penalties by Switzerland. In September 2026, he was included in Colombia's squad for a series of friendlies against Mexico, Paraguay and Peru.

== Style of play ==
Ríos is a box-to-box central midfielder who contributes both defensively and in attack. His close control and dribbling in tight spaces, which he attributes to his years in futsal, are the most distinctive features of his game; he recorded the best dribble success rate of the 2023 Série A and the most successful dribbles at the 2024 Copa América. He is also physically strong and covers ground with a long stride, and Lorenzo has highlighted his power, his forward runs and his ball control. Abel Ferreira described him as "explosive" and "aggressive", while Mourinho praised his commitment, physicality and ability to handle pressure. His passing has been described as inconsistent.

== Personal life ==
Ríos is a Christian, and several of his tattoos, including the Lord's Prayer on his arm, refer to his faith. Responding to criticism of the tattoos in 2024, he said he did not consider himself an influencer and that "values and influences come from home". His father reviews each of his matches with him.

== Career statistics ==
=== Club ===
As of match played 30 October 2026

Appearances and goals by club, season and competition
Club	Season	League			State league (Note: Includes Campeonato Carioca, Campeonato Paulista)		National cup (Note: Includes Copa do Brasil, Taça de Portugal)		League cup (Note: Includes Taça da Liga)		Continental		Other		Total	
Club	Season	Division	Apps	Goals	Apps	Goals	Apps	Goals	Apps	Goals	Apps	Goals	Apps	Goals	Apps	Goals
Flamengo	2020	Série A	1	0	2	0	0	0	—		0	0	—		3	0
Flamengo	2021	Série A	0	0	4	0	0	0	—		0	0	—		4	0
Flamengo	Total		1	0	6	0	0	0	—		0	0	—		7	0
Mazatlán (loan)	2021–22	Liga MX	6	0	—		—		—		—		—		6	0
Guarani	2022	Série B	9	1	—		—		—		—		—		9	1
Guarani	2023	Série B	—		11	2	—		—		—		—		11	2
Guarani	Total		9	1	11	2	—		—		—		—		20	3
Palmeiras	2023	Série A	37	2	—		6	1	—		10 (Note: Appearances in Copa Libertadores)	0	—		53	3
Palmeiras	2024	Série A	24	3	14	0	4	0	—		6	1	1 (Note: Appearance in Supercopa do Brasil)	0	49	4
Palmeiras	2025	Série A	10	0	14	2	2	0	—		5	2	5 (Note: Appearances in FIFA Club World Cup)	0	36	4
Palmeiras	Total		71	5	28	2	12	1	—		21	3	6	0	138	11
Benfica	2025–26	Primeira Liga	27	5	—		3	2	2	0	12 (Note: Appearances in UEFA Champions League)	1	1 (Note: Appearance in Supertaça Cândido de Oliveira)	0	45	8
Benfica	2026–27	Primeira Liga	2	0	—		—		—		4 (Note: Appearances in UEFA Europa League)	0	—		6	0
Benfica	Total		29	5	—		3	2	2	0	16	1	1	0	51	8
Al-Ittihad (loan)	2026–27	Saudi Pro League	6	0	—		0	0	—		3 (Note: Appearances in AFC Champions League Elite)	1	—		9	1
Career total			122	11	45	4	15	3	2	0	40	5	7	0	231	23

=== International ===
As of match played 6 October 2026

Appearances and goals by national team and year
National team	Year	Apps	Goals
Colombia	2023	3	0
Colombia	2024	16	2
Colombia	2025	9	0
Colombia	2026	12	0
Total		40	2

Scores and results list Colombia's goal tally first.

List of international goals scored by Richard Ríos
No.	Date	Venue	Opponent	Score	Result	Competition
1.	8 June 2024	Commanders Field, Landover, United States	United States	3–1	5–1	Friendly
2.	6 July 2024	State Farm Stadium, Glendale, United States	Panama	4–0	5–0	2024 Copa América

== Honours ==
Flamengo

- Campeonato Brasileiro Série A: 2020
- Campeonato Carioca: 2020, 2021

Palmeiras

- Campeonato Brasileiro Série A: 2023
- Campeonato Paulista: 2024

Benfica

- Supertaça Cândido de Oliveira: 2025

Colombia

- Copa América runner-up: 2024

Individual

- Campeonato Paulista Team of the Year: 2025
