= Eusébio Cup =

Coordinates: 38°45′13″N 9°10′57.5″W

- Eusébio Cup logo
- Organiser(s): Benfica
- Founded: 2008
- Teams: 2
- Current champions: (Portugal) Benfica (6th title)
- Most championships: (Portugal) Benfica (6 titles)
- Broadcaster: BTV

Poster for the ninth edition of the Eusébio Cup (2016)

The Eusébio Cup is a pre-season friendly football match hosted by Portuguese club S.L. Benfica since 2008. It has been played mostly at their home stadium, Estádio da Luz, with the two exceptions being the 2015 and 2018 editions (played at Estadio BBVA and Estádio Algarve, respectively).

The two-team competition is named after former Benfica player and Portugal international Eusébio, who presented the trophy to the winning team until 2013, before his death in January 2014. There were plans to extend the number of participants to four, a move that Eusébio himself was in favor of, but no changes were ever made in that regard.

The cup's first edition was won by Inter Milan, with the other winners being Benfica (2009, 2011, 2012, 2022, 2024, 2025), Tottenham (2010), São Paulo (2013), Ajax (2014), Monterrey (2015), Torino (2016) – in a match that also served to honour the memory of the Grande Torino team who died in the Superga air disaster – and Lyon (2018). No invited team, also including runners-up AC Milan, Arsenal, Real Madrid, Newcastle United, Feyenoord and Fenerbahçe, has participated in more than one edition.

The invitational match has been played in late July and early August, and it was played annually and without interruption until 2016. Despite two tries, there was no edition in 2017. A year later, the Eusébio Cup returned as part of the 2018 International Champions Cup. The competition was revived after a three-year hiatus, in 2022. The match was not played in 2023 and returned once again the following year.

== Trophy ==
The Eusébio Cup trophy is made out of glass and bears the name of the match and its winners. Moreover, it features a figure of Eusébio, on the top, performing his trademark shooting technique. The figure is similar to Eusébio's statue outside Estádio da Luz. The trophy is symbolic because it is dedicated to Eusébio, who is considered one of the greatest footballers of all time, and Benfica's greatest.

== Broadcasters ==
The following is a list of television channels who broadcast the matches for Portugal.

Year	Broadcaster	Ref.
2008–2009	SIC	
2010	Benfica TV	
2011	TVI	
2012	RTP	
2013–2016	Benfica TV	
2018	Sport TV	
2022, 2024	Benfica TV	

== Matches ==
=== 2008 ===
15 August 2008
19:45 WEST

Benfica (Portugal)	0–0	(Italy) Inter Milan
Penalties
Aimar (penalty scored); Bastos (penalty missed); Reyes (penalty scored); Nuno Gomes (penalty scored); David Luiz (penalty scored); Nélson (penalty missed)	4–5	(penalty scored) Maxwell; (penalty scored) Balotelli; (penalty scored) Stanković; (penalty missed) Ibrahimović; (penalty scored) Burdisso; (penalty scored) Cambiasso

Estádio da Luz, Lisbon
Attendance: 54,001
Referee: Bruno Paixão

=== 2009 ===
8 August 2009
19:00 WEST

Benfica (Portugal)	1–1	(Italy) Milan
Cardozo 58'		Sidnei 87' (o.g.)
Penalties
Keirrison (penalty scored); Shaffer (penalty scored); Coentrão (penalty missed); Amorim (penalty scored); Weldon (penalty missed); Yebda (penalty scored); Patric (penalty missed); Sidnei (penalty scored)	5–4	(penalty scored) Pirlo; (penalty missed) Ronaldinho; (penalty scored) Jankulovski; (penalty missed) Thiago Silva; (penalty scored) Borriello; (penalty scored) Pato; (penalty missed) Zambrotta; (penalty missed) Antonini

Estádio da Luz, Lisbon
Attendance: 62,342
Referee: João Ferreira

=== 2010 ===
3 August 2010
19:45 WEST

Benfica (Portugal)	0–1	(England) Tottenham Hotspur
		Bale 55'

Estádio da Luz, Lisbon
Attendance: 30,215
Referee: Pedro Proença

=== 2011 ===
6 August 2011
19:45 WEST

Benfica (Portugal)	2–1	(England) Arsenal
Aimar 49'; Nolito 60'	Report	Van Persie 34'

Estádio da Luz, Lisbon
Attendance: 40,833
Referee: Duarte Gomes

=== 2012 ===
27 July 2012
19:00 WEST

Benfica (Portugal)	5–2	(Spain) Real Madrid
García 4'; Witsel 22'; Pérez 53', 85'; Martins 58'		Callejón 18', 20'

Estádio da Luz, Lisbon
Attendance: 35,476
Referee: Bruno Paixão

=== 2013 ===
3 August 2013
19:45 WEST

Benfica (Portugal)	0–2	(Brazil) São Paulo
		Aloísio 53'; Tolói 63'

Estádio da Luz, Lisbon
Attendance: 30,638
Referee: Duarte Gomes

=== 2014 ===
26 July 2014
19:45 WEST

Benfica (Portugal)	0–1	(Netherlands) Ajax
		Kishna 41'

Estádio da Luz, Lisbon
Attendance: 25,240
Referee: Hugo Miguel

=== 2015 ===
2 August 2015
22:00 CDT

Monterrey (Mexico)	3–0	(Portugal) Benfica
Montes 49'; Funes Mori 58' (pen.); Rivera 81'

Estadio BBVA Bancomer, Monterrey
Attendance: 51,000
Referee: Francisco Chacón

=== 2016 ===
27 July 2016
19:45 WEST

Benfica (Portugal)	1–1	(Italy) Torino
Vives 11' (o.g.)		Ljajić 32'
Penalties
Jiménez (penalty scored); Jonas (penalty scored); Grimaldo (penalty scored); Samaris (penalty scored); Pizzi (penalty scored); Lindelöf (penalty missed)	5–6	(penalty scored) Baselli; (penalty scored) Aramu; (penalty scored) Boyé; (penalty scored) Martínez; (penalty scored) López; (penalty scored) Silva

Estádio da Luz, Lisbon
Attendance: 45,818
Referee: Fábio Veríssimo

=== 2017 ===
22 July 2017	Benfica (Portugal)	Cancelled	(Brazil) Chapecoense	Estádio da Luz, Lisbon
19:45 WEST
Note: The Brazilian Football Confederation did not authorize Chapecoense's participation due to the overlapping dates with Brazilian competitions.

6 October 2017	Benfica (Portugal)	Cancelled	(Scotland) Rangers	Tim Hortons Field, Hamilton
19:00 EST
Note: The match was cancelled due to Elite Soccer Entertainment not being able to meet the contractual obligations and the commitments established with both clubs.

=== 2018 ===
International Champions Cup
1 August 2018
21:05 WEST

Benfica (Portugal)	2–3	(France) Lyon
Pizzi 59'; Marcelo 64' (o.g.)		Marcelo 41'; Traoré 45'; Terrier 83'

Estádio Algarve, Faro/Loulé
Attendance: 17,510
Referee: Hélder Malheiro

=== 2022 ===
26 July 2022
20:00 WEST

Benfica (Portugal)	3–2	(England) Newcastle United
Ramos 15'; Grimaldo 32'; Araújo 89'		Almirón 22', 44'

Estádio da Luz, Lisbon
Attendance: 49,081
Referee: Nuno Almeida

=== 2024 ===
28 July 2024
20:00 WEST

Benfica (Portugal)	5–0	(Netherlands) Feyenoord
Prestianni 9'; Pavlidis 13', 15'; Beste 18'; Cabral 89'

Estádio da Luz, Lisbon
Attendance: 54,317
Referee: Luís Godinho

=== 2025 ===
26 July 2025
20:00 WEST

Benfica (Portugal)	3–2	(Turkey) Fenerbahçe
Aktürkoğlu 37'; Brown 42' (o.g.); Araújo 81'		Kahveci 45'; En-Nesyri 60'

Estádio da Luz, Lisbon
Referee: Hélder Carvalho

== Performance by team ==
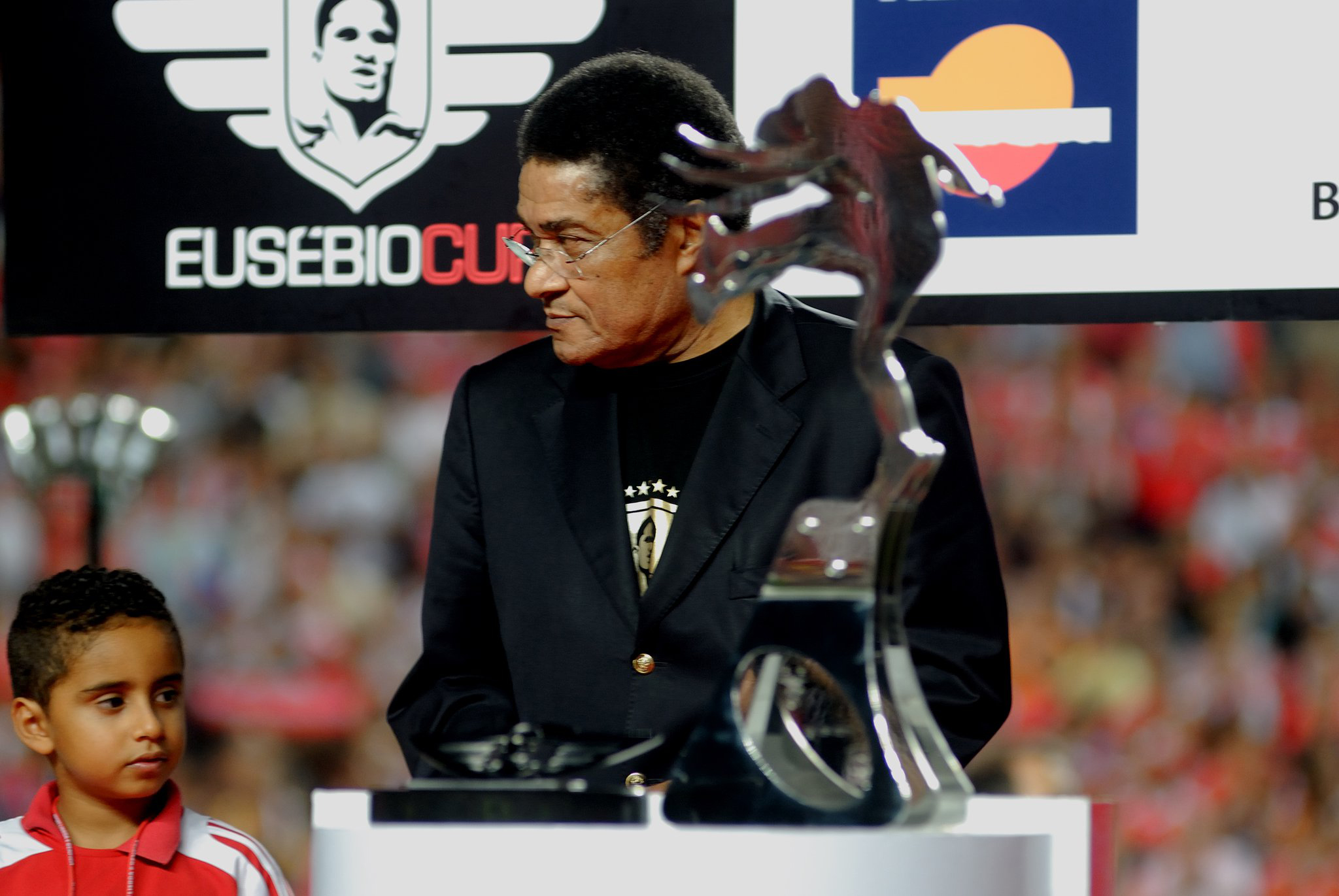
Eusébio with the trophy of the fourth edition (2011)

Team	Winners	Runners-up	Year(s) won	Year(s) runners-up
(Portugal) Benfica	6	7	2009, 2011, 2012, 2022, 2024, 2025	2008, 2010, 2013, 2014, 2015, 2016, 2018
(Italy) Inter Milan	1	—	2008	—
(England) Tottenham Hotspur	1	—	2010	—
(Brazil) São Paulo	1	—	2013	—
(Netherlands) Ajax	1	—	2014	—
(Mexico) Monterrey	1	—	2015	—
(Italy) Torino	1	—	2016	—
(France) Lyon	1	—	2018	—
(Italy) Milan	—	1	—	2009
(England) Arsenal	—	1	—	2011
(Spain) Real Madrid	—	1	—	2012
(England) Newcastle United	—	1	—	2022
(Netherlands) Feyenoord	—	1	—	2024
(Turkey) Fenerbahçe	—	1	—	2025
