= Diogo Prioste =

Portuguese footballer

Personal information
- Full name: Diogo Ferreira Prioste
- Date of birth: 26 March 2004 (age 22)
- Place of birth: Lisbon, Portugal
- Height: 1.79 m (5 ft 10 in)
- Position: Midfielder

Team information
- Current team: Gil Vicente (on loan from Benfica B)
- Number: 86

Youth career
- 2010: Damaia Ginásio Clube
- 2010–: Benfica

Senior career*
Years	Team	Apps	(Gls)
2022–	Benfica B	68	(10)
2025–	Benfica	2	(0)

International career^{‡}
2019	Portugal U15	5	(0)
2019–2020	Portugal U16	11	(2)
2022	Portugal U18	7	(1)
2022–2023	Portugal U19	7	(0)
2023–2024	Portugal U20	5	(0)
Medal record
Men's football
Representing Portugal
UEFA European Under-19 Championship
Runner-up	2023 Malta
- * Club domestic league appearances and goals as of 00:05, 26 January 2026 (UTC) ‡ National team caps and goals as of 14:14, 8 November 2025 (UTC)

Diogo Ferreira Prioste (born 26 March 2004) is a Portuguese professional footballer who plays as a midfielder for Primeira Liga club Gil Vicente, on loan from Benfica B.

== Club career ==
Having started his career with Damaia Ginásio Clube, Prioste moved to Benfica. He signed his first professional contract in September 2020.

== International career ==
Prioste has represented Portugal at youth international level.

== Career statistics ==
=== Club ===
As of match played 25 January 2026

Appearances and goals by club, season and competition
Club	Season	League			National cup		League cup		Europe		Other		Total	
Club	Season	Division	Apps	Goals	Apps	Goals	Apps	Goals	Apps	Goals	Apps	Goals	Apps	Goals
Benfica B	2021–22	Liga Portugal 2	1	0	—		—		—		—		1	0
Benfica B	2022–23	Liga Portugal 2	0	0	—		—		—		—		0	0
Benfica B	2023–24	Liga Portugal 2	27	1	—		—		—		—		27	1
Benfica B	2024–25	Liga Portugal 2	27	7	—		—		—		—		27	7
Benfica B	2025–26	Liga Portugal 2	13	2	—		—		—		—		13	2
Benfica B	Total		68	10	—		—		—		—		68	10
Benfica	2024–25	Primeira Liga	1	0	0	0	0	0	0	0	0	0	1	0
Benfica	2025–26	Primeira Liga	1	0	0	0	0	0	0	0	0	0	1	0
Benfica	Total		2	0	0	0	0	0	0	0	0	0	2	0
Career total			70	10	0	0	0	0	0	0	0	0	70	10

== Honours ==
Benfica

- Campeonato Nacional de Juniores: 2021–22
- Under-20 Intercontinental Cup: 2022
