= 2025 Supertaça Cândido de Oliveira =

Supertaça Cândido de Oliveira Betano
- Event: Supertaça Cândido de Oliveira (Portuguese Super Cup)
Sporting CP	Benfica
0	1
- Date: 31 July 2025
- Venue: Estádio Algarve, Faro/Loulé
- Referee: Fábio Veríssimo
- Attendance: 19,354

The 2025 Supertaça Cândido de Oliveira was the 47th edition of the Supertaça Cândido de Oliveira. It was played between the winners of the 2024–25 Primeira Liga and the 2024–25 Taça de Portugal, Sporting CP, and the runners-up of the 2024–25 Primeira Liga and the 2024–25 Taça de Portugal, Benfica, on 31 July 2025. Benfica won the match 1–0 to secure their 10th Supertaça title.

== Venue ==
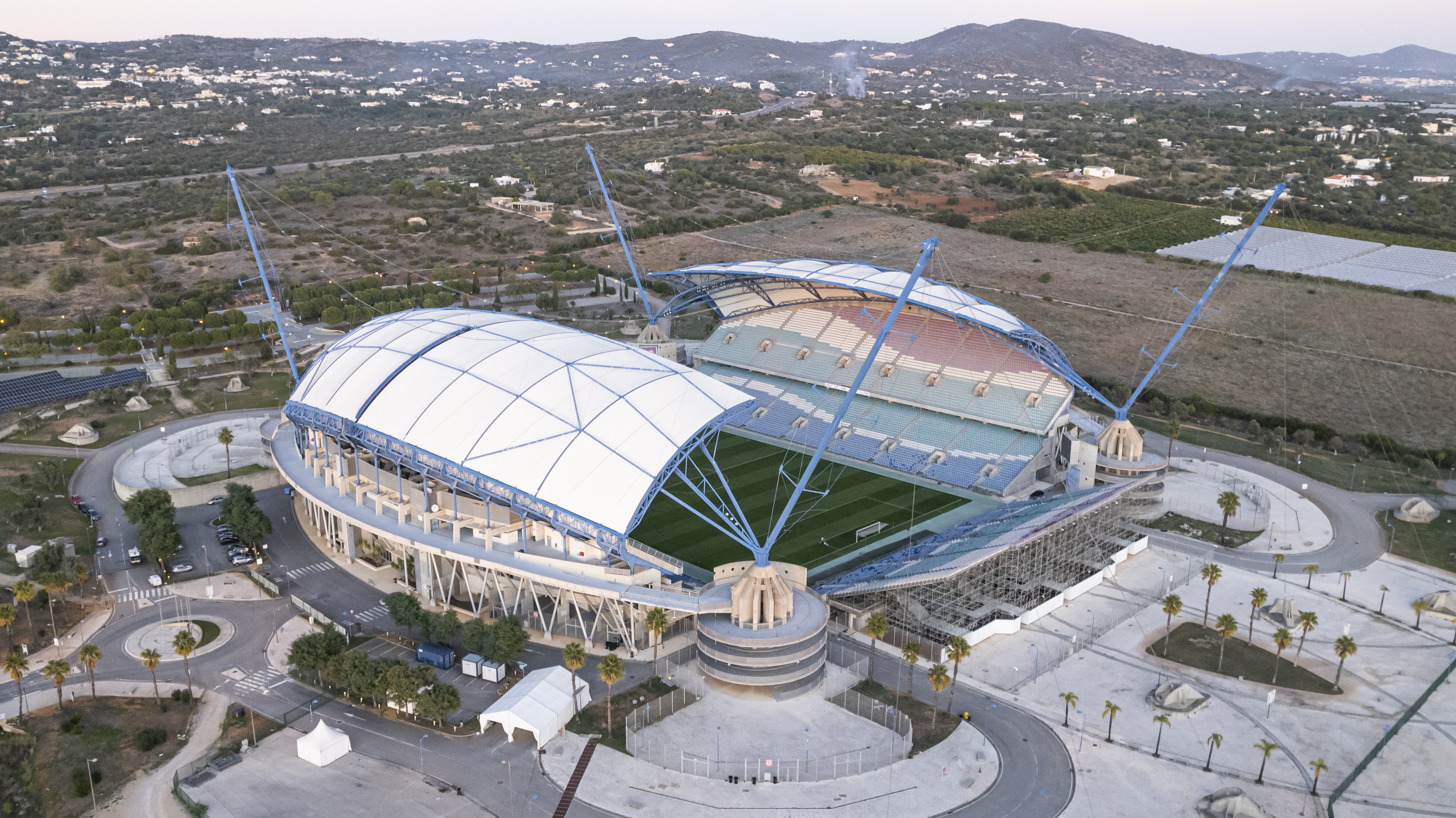
Estádio do Algarve

This was the fifth time the Supertaça was played at the Estádio Algarve.

== Match ==
=== Details ===
31 July 2025
20:45 WEST (UTC+01:00)

Sporting CP	0–1	Benfica
	Report	Pavlidis 50'

Estádio Algarve, Faro/Loulé
Attendance: 19,354
Referee: Fábio Veríssimo

Sporting CP	Benfica

GK	1	(Portugal) Rui Silva
RB	22	(Spain) Iván Fresneda
CB	25	(Portugal) Gonçalo Inácio
CB	26	(Ivory Coast) Ousmane Diomande	(yellow card) 29'	(substituted off) 69'
LB	20	(Uruguay) Maximiliano Araújo		(substituted off) 73'
CM	42	(Denmark) Morten Hjulmand (c)	(yellow card) 81'
CM	5	(Japan) Hidemasa Morita		(substituted off) 69'
RM	10	(Mozambique) Geny Catamo		(substituted off) 85'
AM	17	(Portugal) Francisco Trincão
LM	8	(Portugal) Pedro Gonçalves	(yellow card) 53'
CF	9	(Denmark) Conrad Harder		(substituted off) 68'
Substitutes:
GK	12	(Portugal) João Virgínia
DF	3	(Netherlands) Jerry St. Juste	(yellow card) 90+7'
DF	6	(Belgium) Zeno Debast		(substituted on) 69'
DF	47	(Portugal) Ricardo Esgaio		(substituted on) 85'
DF	72	(Portugal) Eduardo Quaresma
MF	14	(Georgia (country)) Giorgi Kochorashvili		(substituted on) 69'
MF	52	(Portugal) João Simões
FW	7	(Portugal) Geovany Quenda		(substituted on) 73'
FW	97	(Colombia) Luis Suárez	(yellow card) 90+6'	(substituted on) 68'
Manager:
(Portugal) Rui Borges

GK	1	(Ukraine) Anatoliy Trubin	(yellow card) 90+6'
RB	17	(Bosnia and Herzegovina) Amar Dedić	(yellow card) 23'	(substituted off) 88'
CB	4	(Portugal) António Silva	(yellow card) 90+1'
CB	30	(Argentina) Nicolás Otamendi (c)	(yellow card) 73'
LB	26	(Sweden) Samuel Dahl
CM	5	(Argentina) Enzo Barrenechea		(substituted off) 80'
CM	20	(Colombia) Richard Ríos
CM	18	(Luxembourg) Leandro Barreiro		(substituted off) 90+8'
RW	8	(Norway) Fredrik Aursnes
LW	7	(Turkey) Kerem Aktürkoğlu		(substituted off) 80'
CF	14	(Greece) Vangelis Pavlidis		(substituted off) 88'
Substitutes:
GK	24	(Portugal) Samuel Soares
DF	3	(Spain) Rafael Obrador
DF	64	(Portugal) Gonçalo Oliveira
MF	61	(Portugal) Florentino		(substituted on) 80'
MF	68	(Portugal) João Veloso	(yellow card) 90+9'	(substituted on) 90+8'
FW	21	(Norway) Andreas Schjelderup
FW	25	(Argentina) Gianluca Prestianni	(yellow card) 90+9'	(substituted on) 80'
FW	39	(Portugal) Henrique Araújo		(substituted on) 88'
FW	47	(Portugal) Tiago Gouveia		(substituted on) 88'
Manager:
(Portugal) Bruno Lage

Match rules
- 90 minutes.
- 30 minutes of extra time if necessary.
- Penalty shoot-out if scores still level.
- Nine named substitutes, of which up to five may be used during regular time.

== See also ==
- Lisbon derby
- 2025–26 Primeira Liga
- 2025–26 Taça de Portugal
- 2025–26 Taça da Liga
- 2025–26 Sporting CP season
- 2025–26 S.L. Benfica season
