= Enzo Barrenechea =

Argentine footballer (born 2001)

Personal information
- Full name: Enzo Alan Tomás Barrenechea
- Date of birth: 22 May 2001 (age 25)
- Place of birth: Villa María, Argentina
- Height: 1.87 m (6 ft 2 in)
- Position: Defensive midfielder

Team information
- Current team: Benfica
- Number: 5

Youth career
- –2019: Newell's Old Boys
- 2019–2020: Sion

Senior career*
Years	Team	Apps	(Gls)
2019–2020	Sion B	7	(0)
2020–2023	Juventus Next Gen (Note: The team's name was changed from Juventus U23 to Juventus Next Gen in August 2022.)	37	(5)
2022–2024	Juventus	3	(0)
2023–2024	→ Frosinone (loan)	36	(0)
2024–2026	Aston Villa	0	(0)
2024–2025	→ Valencia (loan)	30	(1)
2025–2026	→ Benfica (loan)	26	(1)
2026–	Benfica	5	(0)
- * Club domestic league appearances and goals as of 00:11, 21 September 2026 (UTC)

Enzo Alan Tomás Barrenechea (born 22 May 2001) is an Argentine professional footballer who plays as a defensive midfielder for Primeira Liga club Benfica.

== Club career ==
=== Early career ===
In his early years, Barrenechea played for Newell's Old Boys. In the summer of 2019, he moved to Sion for €3.1 million.

=== Juventus ===
In the winter of 2020, Barranechea moved to Juventus U23 – the reserve team of Juventus. He made his debut with Juventus U23 on 25 October 2020, in an away win against Lucchese. On 22 May 2021, Barrenechea injured his ACL. On 20 February 2022, Barrenechea returned from his injury coming on as a substitute in the 59th minute against Seregno in a 2–2 draw. On 2 April, Barrenechea scored the first goal in his career in a 1–1 draw against Virtus Verona. On 21 May, Barrenechea scored a 12th-minute decider in the second leg of the second round of the play-offs - a 1–0 win against Padova, which did not prevent Juventus from being eliminated from the play-offs.

Barrenechea started to get first-team call-ups in the 2022–23 season. He made his debut for Juventus on 2 November 2022 as an 88th-minute substitute for Juan Cuadrado in a 2–1 UEFA Champions League loss against Paris Saint-Germain. By mid-February 2023, he was moved to the senior squad on a permanent basis. He made his Serie A debut for Juventus on 28 February 2023 against Torino. On 1 April, Juventus announced his definitive promotion to the first team.

==== Loan to Frosinone ====
On 15 August 2023, Barrenechea was sent on loan to newly promoted Serie A club Frosinone for the 2023–24 season. He made his debut for the club four days later, coming on as a late substitute for Abdou Harroui in a 3–1 league defeat to Napoli. On 19 December, he scored his first goal for Frosinone in a 4–0 Coppa Italia win over Napoli.

=== Aston Villa ===
On 1 July 2024, Barrenechea signed for Premier League club Aston Villa on a permanent deal, as part of a double-transfer from Juventus, alongside Samuel Iling-Junior. The deal commanded an €8 million fee, plus €3 million in add-ons, and was related to the transfer of Douglas Luiz to Juventus, despite being a separate transaction.

==== Loan to Valencia ====
On 30 August 2024, Barrenechea signed for La Liga club Valencia on a season-long loan. He scored against Getafe CF in October 2024.

=== Benfica ===
On 18 July 2025, Barrenechea signed for Primeira Liga club Benfica on a season-long loan. The transfer was reported to have a €3 million loan fee, with an obligation if certain terms were met to make the transfer permanent for a further €12 million and a 30% sell-on clause. On 7 October 2025, it was reported that Barrenechea had made enough appearances to trigger a permanent transfer the following summer.

== International career ==
Barrenechea was called up to the Argentina U20 side by Lionel Scaloni for the 2018 COTIF Tournament in Spain.

== Style of play ==
Barrenechea is a defensive midfielder, who has drawn comparisons to Paul Pogba and Steven Nzonzi due to his playing style.

== Career statistics ==
=== Club ===
As of match played 13 September 2026

Appearances and goals by club, season and competition
Club	Season	League			National cup (Note: Includes Coppa Italia, Copa del Rey, Taça de Portugal)		League cup (Note: Includes Taça da Liga)		Europe		Other		Total	
Club	Season	Division	Apps	Goals	Apps	Goals	Apps	Goals	Apps	Goals	Apps	Goals	Apps	Goals
Juventus Next Gen	2020–21	Serie C	3	0	—		—		—		0	0	3	0
Juventus Next Gen	2021–22	Serie C	8	1	—		—		—		5 (Note: Appearances in Serie C promotion play-offs)	1	13	2
Juventus Next Gen	2022–23	Serie C	26	4	—		—		—		5 (Note: Appearances in Coppa Italia Serie C)	0	31	4
Juventus Next Gen	Total		37	5	—		—		—		10	1	47	6
Juventus	2022–23	Serie A	3	0	0	0	—		2 (Note: One appearance in UEFA Champions League, one appearance in UEFA Europa League)	0	—		5	0
Frosinone (loan)	2023–24	Serie A	36	0	3	1	—		—		—		39	1
Aston Villa	2024–25	Premier League	0	0	—		—		—		—		0	0
Valencia (loan)	2024–25	La Liga	30	1	2	0	—		—		—		32	1
Benfica (loan)	2025–26	Primeira Liga	26	1	2	0	1	0	13 (Note: Appearances in UEFA Champions League)	1	1 (Note: Appearance in Supertaça Cândido de Oliveira)	0	43	2
Benfica	2026–27	Primeira Liga	5	0	0	0	0	0	6 (Note: Appearances in UEFA Europa League)	0	—		11	0
Benfica	Benfica total		31	1	2	0	1	0	19	1	1	0	54	2
Career total			137	7	7	1	1	0	21	1	11	1	177	10

== Honours ==
Benfica

- Supertaça Cândido de Oliveira: 2025
