= Fredrik Aursnes =

Norwegian footballer (born 1995)

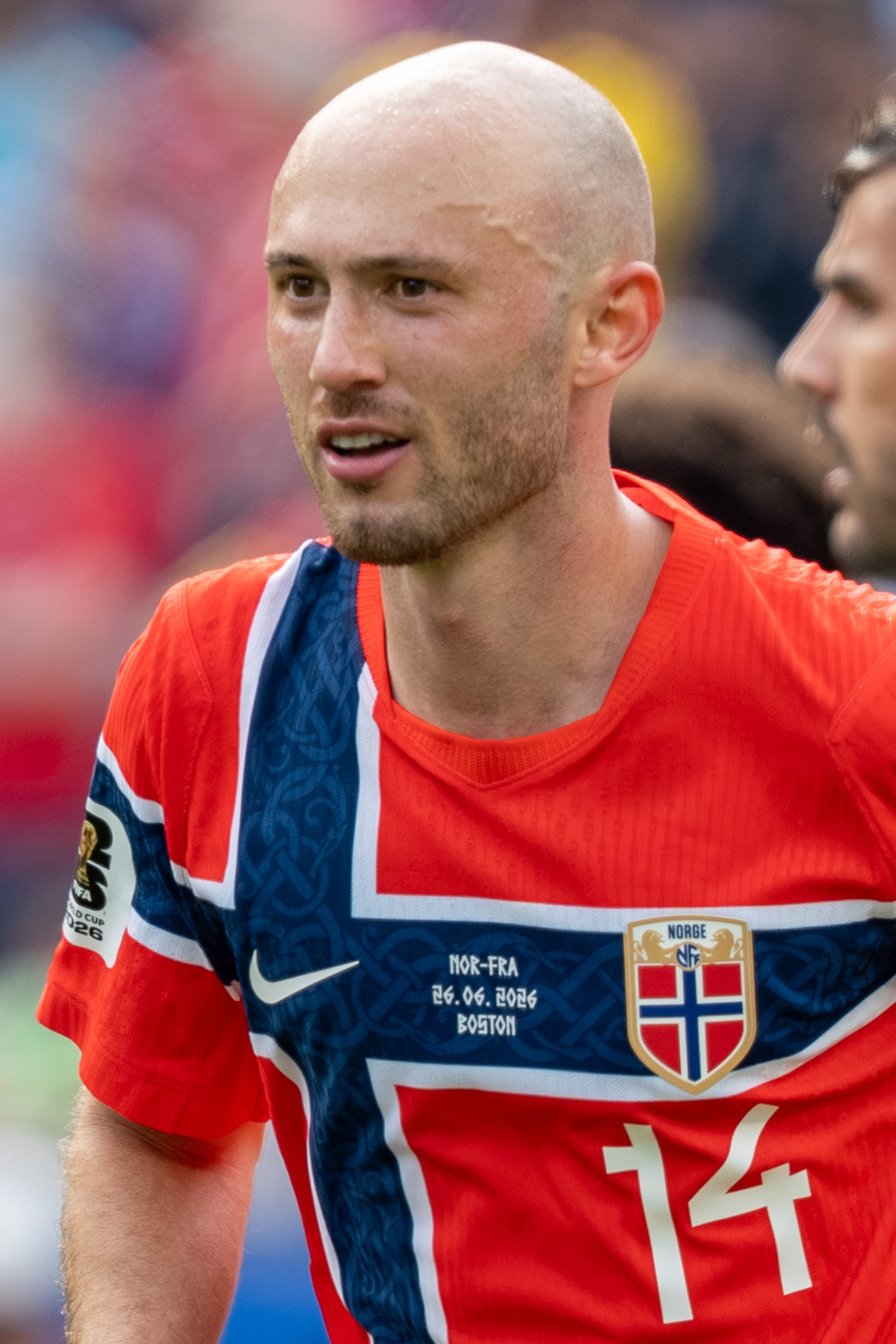
- Aursnes with Norway in 2026

Personal information
- Date of birth: 10 December 1995 (age 30)
- Place of birth: Hareid Municipality, Norway
- Height: 1.80 m (5 ft 11 in)
- Positions: Central midfielder; full-back; wide midfielder

Team information
- Current team: Benfica
- Number: 8

Youth career
- 2008–2012: Hareid

Senior career*
Years	Team	Apps	(Gls)
2012–2016	Hødd	106	(11)
2016–2021	Molde	149	(17)
2021–2022	Feyenoord	35	(1)
2022–	Benfica	124	(11)

International career^{‡}
2013	Norway U18	2	(0)
2014–2016	Norway U21	14	(1)
2021–	Norway	32	(1)
- * Club domestic league appearances and goals as of 22:36, 2 November 2026 (UTC) ‡ National team caps and goals as of 5 October 2026

Fredrik Aursnes (born 10 December 1995) is a Norwegian professional footballer who plays as a central midfielder or full-back for Primeira Liga club Benfica, which he also captains, and the Norway national team.

== Club career ==
=== Early career ===
Aursnes played youth football for Hareid, before joining Hødd before the 2012 season. He made his senior league debut in April 2012 in a 2–1 win against Bodø/Glimt. Aged 16 years and 350 days, he became the all-time youngest winner and youngest finalist of the Norwegian Cup after Hødd's win against Tromsø IL in the final.

=== Molde ===
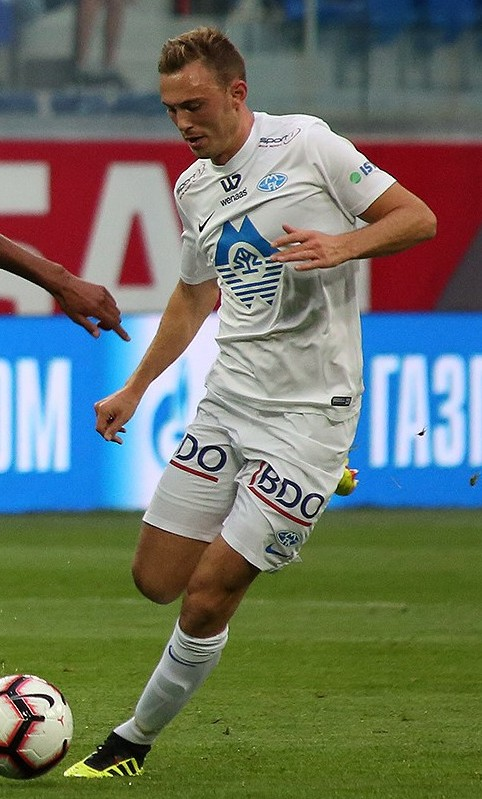
Aursnes with Molde in 2018

In December 2015, Aursnes joined Molde on a four-year deal. He debuted on 18 February 2016 against Sevilla in the UEFA Europa League round of 32, first leg. On 22 April 2019, Aursnes got his 100th first-team appearance for the club in their 2–0 away win against Lillestrøm. On 30 April 2019, Aursnes signed a two-year contract extension that ties him to Molde until the end of the 2021 season. On 11 July 2019, he scored Molde's second goal in the club's UEFA competitions record 7–1 win over KR in the UEFA Europa League first qualifying round.

=== Feyenoord ===
On 8 August 2021, following their 5–4 victory over Haugesund, Molde announced that Aursnes had been sold to Feyenoord. On 10 August 2021, Aursnes signed a three-year contract at the club. He scored his first goal for Feyenoord against SC Cambuur, in a 3–2 victory on 24 October 2021.

=== Benfica ===
On 24 August 2022, Aursnes signed a five-year contract with Primeira Liga side Benfica, for a reported fee of €13 million plus €2 million in add-ons. He made his debut for the club on 27 August, replacing Enzo Fernández in the 90th minute in a 3–0 away win over Boavista in the Primeira Liga.

On 29 January 2026, he helped Benfica advance to the Champions League knockouts after assisting goalkeeper Anatoliy Trubin against Real Madrid for a 4-2 win.

== International career ==
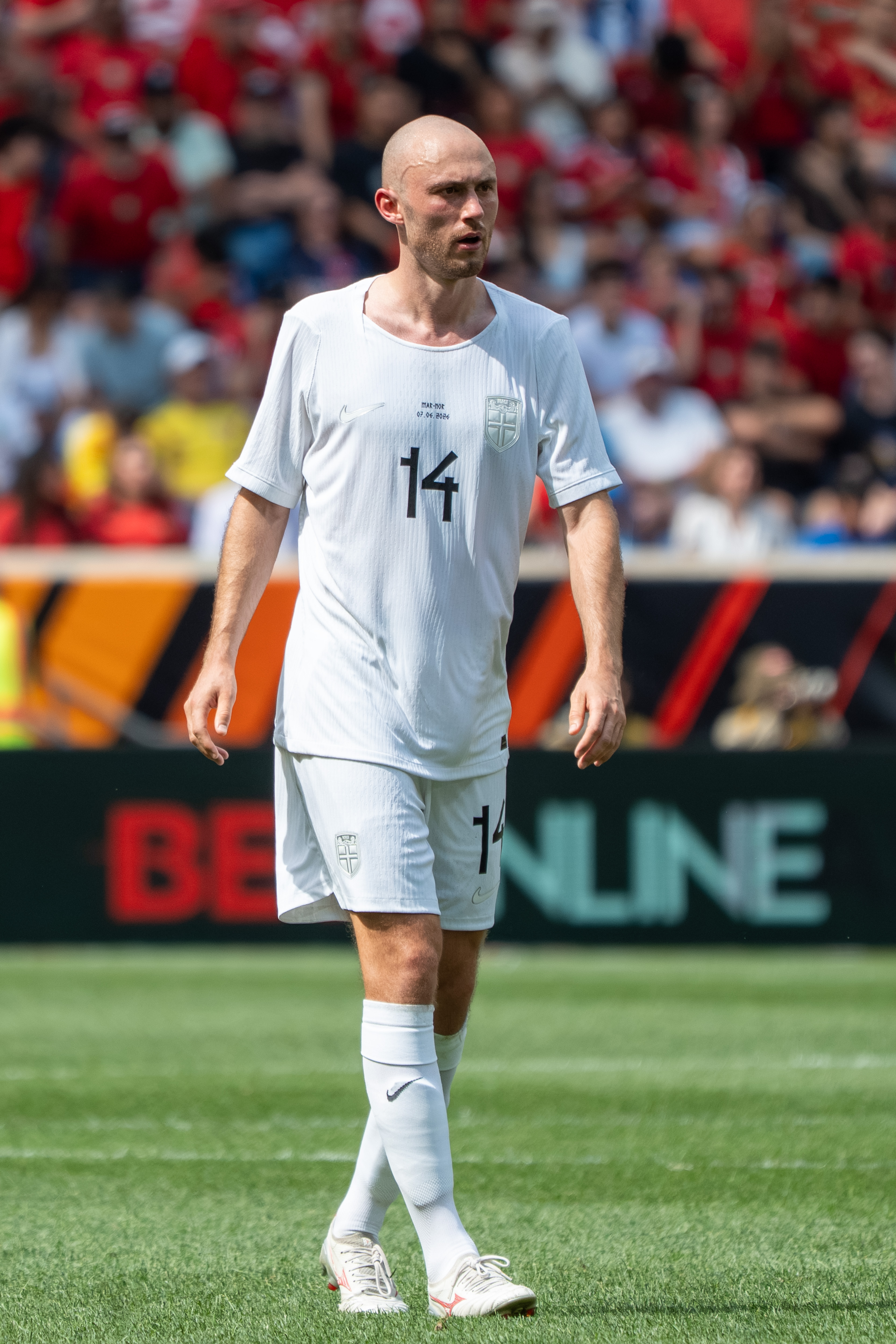
Aursnes with Norway in 2026

Aursnes made his debut for Norway national team on 6 June 2021 in a friendly against Greece. He substituted Patrick Berg in the 69th minute.

On 12 March 2024 national team manager Ståle Solbakken announced that Aursnes had decided to retire internationally. However, on 3 February 2026, Aursnes announced that he would be available for selection ahead of the upcoming World Cup.

== Career statistics ==
=== Club ===
As of match played 5 November 2026

Appearances and goals by club, season and competition
Club	Season	League			National cup (Note: Includes Norwegian Cup, KNVB Cup, Taça de Portugal)		League cup (Note: Includes Taça da Liga)		Europe		Other		Total	
Club	Season	Division	Apps	Goals	Apps	Goals	Apps	Goals	Apps	Goals	Apps	Goals	Apps	Goals
Hødd	2012	1. divisjon	25	0	5	1	—		—		—		30	1
Hødd	2013	1. divisjon	27	2	2	0	—		2 (Note: Appearances in UEFA Europa League)	0	—		31	2
Hødd	2014	1. divisjon	27	6	1	0	—		—		—		28	6
Hødd	2015	1. divisjon	27	3	4	0	—		—		—		31	3
Hødd	Total		106	11	12	1	—		2	0	—		120	12
Molde	2016	Tippeligaen	23	3	2	0	—		2	0	—		27	3
Molde	2017	Eliteserien	27	1	3	0	—		—		—		30	1
Molde	2018	Eliteserien	29	8	1	0	—		7	2	—		37	10
Molde	2019	Eliteserien	30	1	1	0	—		8	1	—		39	2
Molde	2020	Eliteserien	27	3	0	0	—		11 (Note: Five appearances in UEFA Champions League, six appearances in UEFA Europa League)	0	—		38	3
Molde	2021	Eliteserien	13	1	1	0	—		7 (Note: Four appearances in UEFA Europa League, three appearances in UEFA Europa Conference League)	0	—		21	1
Molde	Total		149	17	8	0	—		35	3	—		192	20
Feyenoord	2021–22	Eredivisie	33	1	1	0	—		13 (Note: Appearances in UEFA Europa Conference League)	0	—		47	1
Feyenoord	2022–23	Eredivisie	2	0	—		—		—		—		2	0
Feyenoord	Total		35	1	1	0	—		13	0	—		49	1
Benfica	2022–23	Primeira Liga	28	2	3	0	1	0	10 (Note: Appearances in UEFA Champions League)	1	—		42	3
Benfica	2023–24	Primeira Liga	33	2	6	2	3	0	12 (Note: Six appearances in UEFA Champions League, six appearances in UEFA Europa League)	0	1 (Note: Appearance in Supertaça Cândido de Oliveira)	0	55	4
Benfica	2024–25	Primeira Liga	29	3	5	0	3	0	12	0	4 (Note: Appearances in FIFA Club World Cup)	0	53	3
Benfica	2025–26	Primeira Liga	28	3	4	0	2	0	14	1	1	0	49	4
Benfica	2026–27	Primeira Liga	6	1	0	0	1	0	5	1	—		12	2
Benfica	Total		124	11	18	2	10	0	53	3	6	0	211	16
Career total			414	40	39	3	10	0	103	6	6	0	572	49

=== International ===
As of match played 4 October 2026

Appearances and goals by national team and year
National team	Year	Apps	Goals
Norway	2021	4	0
Norway	2022	6	0
Norway	2023	10	1
Norway	2024	0	0
Norway	2025	0	0
Norway	2026	12	0
Total		32	1

Norway score listed first, score column indicates score after each Aursnes goal.

List of international goals scored by Fredrik Aursnes
No.	Date	Venue	Cap	Opponent	Score	Result	Competition	Ref.
1.	12 October 2023	AEK Arena, Larnaca, Cyprus	17	Cyprus	4–0	4–0	UEFA Euro 2024 qualifying	

== Honours ==
Hødd

- Norwegian Cup: 2012

Molde

- Eliteserien: 2019

Benfica

- Primeira Liga: 2022–23
- Taça da Liga: 2024–25
- Supertaça Cândido de Oliveira: 2023, 2025

Individual

- Eredivisie Team of the Month: January 2022
- Primeira Liga Team of the Year: 2024–25
- Cosme Damião Awards – Footballer of the Year: 2025
