= João Veloso =

Portuguese footballer

Personal information
- Full name: João Miguel Fins Veloso
- Date of birth: 26 June 2005 (age 21)
- Place of birth: Albufeira, Portugal
- Height: 1.86 m (6 ft 1 in)
- Position: Midfielder

Team information
- Current team: Moreirense (on loan from Benfica)
- Number: 20

Youth career
- 2012–2014: CB Loulé
- 2014–2017: CB Albufeira
- 2017–: Benfica

Senior career*
Years	Team	Apps	(Gls)
2023–	Benfica B	43	(6)
2024–	Benfica	2	(0)
2026–	→ Moreirense (loan)	4	(1)

International career^{‡}
2019–2021	Portugal U16	6	(1)
2021–2022	Portugal U17	17	(5)
2022–2023	Portugal U18	9	(2)
2024–	Portugal U20	9	(0)
- * Club domestic league appearances and goals as of 9 September 2026 ‡ National team caps and goals as of 17 November 2025

João Miguel Fins Veloso (born 26 June 2005) is a Portuguese professional footballer who plays as a midfielder for Primeira Liga club Moreirense on loan from Benfica.

== Professional career ==
Veloso is a youth product of CB Loulé, CB Albufeira and Benfica. On 18 June 2022, he signed his first professional contract with Benfica. In September 2022, he was named by English newspaper The Guardian as one of the best players born in 2005 worldwide.

On 13 July 2026, Veloso was loaned by Moreirense for the 2026–27 season.

== International career ==
Veloso is a youth international for Portugal, having played with the Portugal U16s, U17s, U18s and U20s.

== Playing style ==
Veloso is a complete midfielder, with tactical intelligence and strength. He is skilled at maintaining the team's tempo, starts attacking tempo, and can also finish well.

== Career statistics ==
As of match played 1 November 2025

Appearances and goals by club, season and competition
Club	Season	League			National cup		League cup		Europe		Other		Total	
Club	Season	Division	Apps	Goals	Apps	Goals	Apps	Goals	Apps	Goals	Apps	Goals	Apps	Goals
Benfica B	2024–25	Liga Portugal 2	28	1	—		—		—		—		28	1
Benfica B	2025–26	Liga Portugal 2	4	0	—		—		—		—		4	0
Benfica B	Total		32	1	—		—		—		—		32	1
Benfica	2024–25	Primeira Liga	0	0	1	0	0	0	0	0	1 (Note: Appearance in FIFA Club World Cup)	0	2	0
Benfica	2025–26	Primeira Liga	2	0	1	0	0	0	0	0	1 (Note: Appearance in Supertaça Cândido de Oliveira)	0	4	0
Benfica	Total		2	0	2	0	0	0	0	0	2	0	6	0
Career total			34	1	2	0	0	0	0	0	2	0	38	1

== Honours ==
Benfica

- Supertaça Cândido de Oliveira: 2025
