= Peixinho (Portuguese footballer) =

Portuguese footballer (born 2004)

Personal information
- Full name: André Tiago Ramos das Neves
- Date of birth: 23 May 2004 (age 22)
- Place of birth: Gondomar, Portugal
- Height: 1.85 m (6 ft 1 in)
- Position: Winger

Team information
- Current team: Estoril
- Number: 17

Youth career
- 2019–2021: Sousense
- 2021–2023: Gondomar
- 2023–2025: Gil Vicente
- 2025: Estoril

Senior career*
Years	Team	Apps	(Gls)
2023–2025	Gil Vicente	0	(0)
2025–	Estoril	16	(1)
- * Club domestic league appearances and goals as of 21:02, 17 October 2026 (UTC)

André Tiago Ramos das Neves (born 23 May 2004), known as Peixinho, is a Portuguese professional footballer who plays as a winger for Estoril.

== Career ==
Born in Gondomar in the Porto metropolitan area, Peixinho played as a youth for Sousense and Gondomar before joining Gil Vicente in 2021. He made his only senior appearance for the club on 22 July 2023 in the first round of the Taça da Liga, a 1–0 loss away to Oliveirense; on as a 60th-minute substitute for Marlon, he had a shot saved three minutes later.

On 27 June 2025, Peixinho transferred from Gil Vicente to Estoril on a three-year deal. He made his debut on 19 October as a substitute in a 2–1 win away to Belenenses in the third round of the Taça de Portugal; the following 17 February, after making six Primeira Liga appearances for Ian Cathro's team, he signed a new contract albeit of the same length. He scored his first goal in the last game of the season, a 3–1 loss at home to Benfica; again from the bench, he shot from outside the penalty area in added time.
