= Gianluca Prestianni =

Argentine footballer (born 2006)

Personal information
- Full name: Gianluca Prestianni Gross
- Date of birth: 31 January 2006 (age 20)
- Place of birth: Ciudadela, Buenos Aires, Argentina
- Height: 1.66 m (5 ft 5 in)
- Position: Winger

Team information
- Current team: Benfica
- Number: 25

Youth career
- Vélez Sarsfield

Senior career*
Years	Team	Apps	(Gls)
2022–2024	Vélez Sarsfield	36	(2)
2024	Benfica B	11	(2)
2024–	Benfica	46	(8)

International career^{‡}
2022	Argentina U17	8	(3)
2025	Argentina U20	6	(0)
2025–	Argentina	3	(1)
Medal record
Men's football
Representing Argentina
FIFA U-20 World Cup
Runner-up	2025 Chile
- * Club domestic league appearances and goals as of 23:26, 11 October 2026 (UTC) ‡ National team caps and goals as of 03:28, 4 October 2026 (UTC)

Gianluca Prestianni Gross (Italian: [presˈtjanni]; born 31 January 2006) is an Argentine professional footballer who plays as a winger for Primeira Liga club Benfica and the Argentina national team.

== Club career ==
=== Vélez Sarsfield ===
On 24 May 2022, Prestianni made his professional debut for Vélez Sarsfield in the Copa Libertadores in a match against Estudiantes. On 11 October 2023, he was named by the British newspaper The Guardian as one of the best players born in 2006 worldwide.

=== Benfica ===
On 22 December 2023, Vélez announced that they had reached an agreement with Portuguese club Benfica for the sale of Prestianni. The transfer fee was reported to be €9 million, with up to €2 million in add-ons, and involved 85% of his economic rights. However, the contract was set to be completed only after Prestianni's eighteenth birthday on 31 January 2024. Benfica also officially announced the transfer, with Prestianni signing a contract until 2029. His release clause was reportedly set at €100 million.

He initially played for Benfica B in the Liga Portugal 2. On 17 May 2024, he made his senior debut as a substitute in a 1–1 away draw against Rio Ave. He scored his first goal for the club in a 5–0 away win over Tirsense in the Taça de Portugal semi-final on 9 April 2025.

On 17 February 2026, the Champions League knockout phase play-offs tie game between Benfica and Real Madrid was temporarily halted for 10 minutes, after Real Madrid player Vinícius Júnior alleged that Prestianni had directed racist remarks toward him, alleging that Prestianni had called him "mono" ("monkey" in Spanish) on five occasions. The match eventually resumed and finished in a 1–0 home defeat, with Prestianni stating post-match that Vinícius had "regrettably misunderstood what he thought he heard." UEFA announced they were opening an investigation, and provisionally suspended Prestianni for Benfica's second leg against Real Madrid two days later. Prestianni told UEFA that he had not said a racial remark against Vinícius, but instead had said an "anti-gay" slur. He later said that Real Madrid players had called him racist to throw him off his game and that he had instead called Vinícius "cagón" ("coward" in Spanish) and "maricón" ("faggot" in Spanish) during their confrontation. On 24 April, UEFA handed Prestianni a six-match ban for homophobic conduct toward Vinícius, with part of the sanction being suspended.

== International career ==
Prestianni formerly represented Argentina at under-17 level. In March 2023, TNT Sports reported that Roberto Mancini had an interest in contacting Prestianni to join the Italy national team, weeks after a similar move was successfully completed for fellow Italian–Argentine Mateo Retegui.

In November 2025, Prestianni received his first call-up for the Argentina senior team for a friendly match against Angola. He debuted in the match against Angola on 14 November.

Prestianni was left out of the Argentina squad for the 2026 FIFA World Cup; according to international press, the accusations of racism against Real Madrid's striker Vinícius Júnior and the three-match ban imposed by UEFA for homophobia were determinant for his absence.

== Personal life ==
Born and raised in Argentina, Prestianni is of Italian descent.

== Career statistics ==
=== Club ===
As of match played 22 October 2026

Appearances and goals by club, season and competition
Club	Season	League			National cup (Note: Includes Copa Argentina, Taça de Portugal)		League cup (Note: Includes Taça da Liga)		Continental		Other		Total	
Club	Season	Division	Apps	Goals	Apps	Goals	Apps	Goals	Apps	Goals	Apps	Goals	Apps	Goals
Vélez Sarsfield	2022	Argentine Primera División	5	0	0	0	—		1 (Note: Appearance in Copa Libertadores)	0	—		6	0
Vélez Sarsfield	2023	Argentine Primera División	31	2	2	1	—		—		—		33	3
Vélez Sarsfield	Total		36	2	2	1	—		1	0	—		39	3
Benfica B	2023–24	Liga Portugal 2	6	1	—		—		—		—		6	1
Benfica B	2024–25	Liga Portugal 2	5	1	—		—		—		—		5	1
Benfica B	Total		11	2	—		—		—		—		11	2
Benfica	2023–24	Primeira Liga	1	0	0	0	0	0	0	0	0	0	1	0
Benfica	2024–25	Primeira Liga	8	0	2	1	0	0	0	0	4 (Note: Appearances in FIFA Club World Cup)	0	14	1
Benfica	2025–26	Primeira Liga	29	3	2	0	2	0	7 (Note: Appearances in UEFA Champions League)	0	1 (Note: Appearance in Supertaça Cândido de Oliveira)	0	41	3
Benfica	2026–27	Primeira Liga	8	5	0	0	0	0	7 (Note: Appearances in UEFA Europa League)	4	—		15	9
Benfica	Total		46	8	4	1	2	0	14	4	5	0	71	13
Career total			93	12	6	2	2	0	15	4	5	0	121	18

=== International ===
As of match played 3 October 2026

Appearances and goals by national team and year
National team	Year	Apps	Goals
Argentina	2025	1	0
Argentina	2026	2	1
Total		3	1

Scores and results list Argentina's goal tally first, score column indicates score after each Prestianni goal.

List of international goals scored by Gianluca Prestianni
No.	Date	Venue	Cap	Opponent	Score	Result	Competition
1	3 October 2026	Estadio Monumental, Buenos Aires, Argentina	3	Burkina Faso	3–0	7–0	Friendly

== Honours ==
Benfica

- Supertaça Cândido de Oliveira: 2025
