= Leandro Barreiro =

Luxembourgish footballer (born 2000)

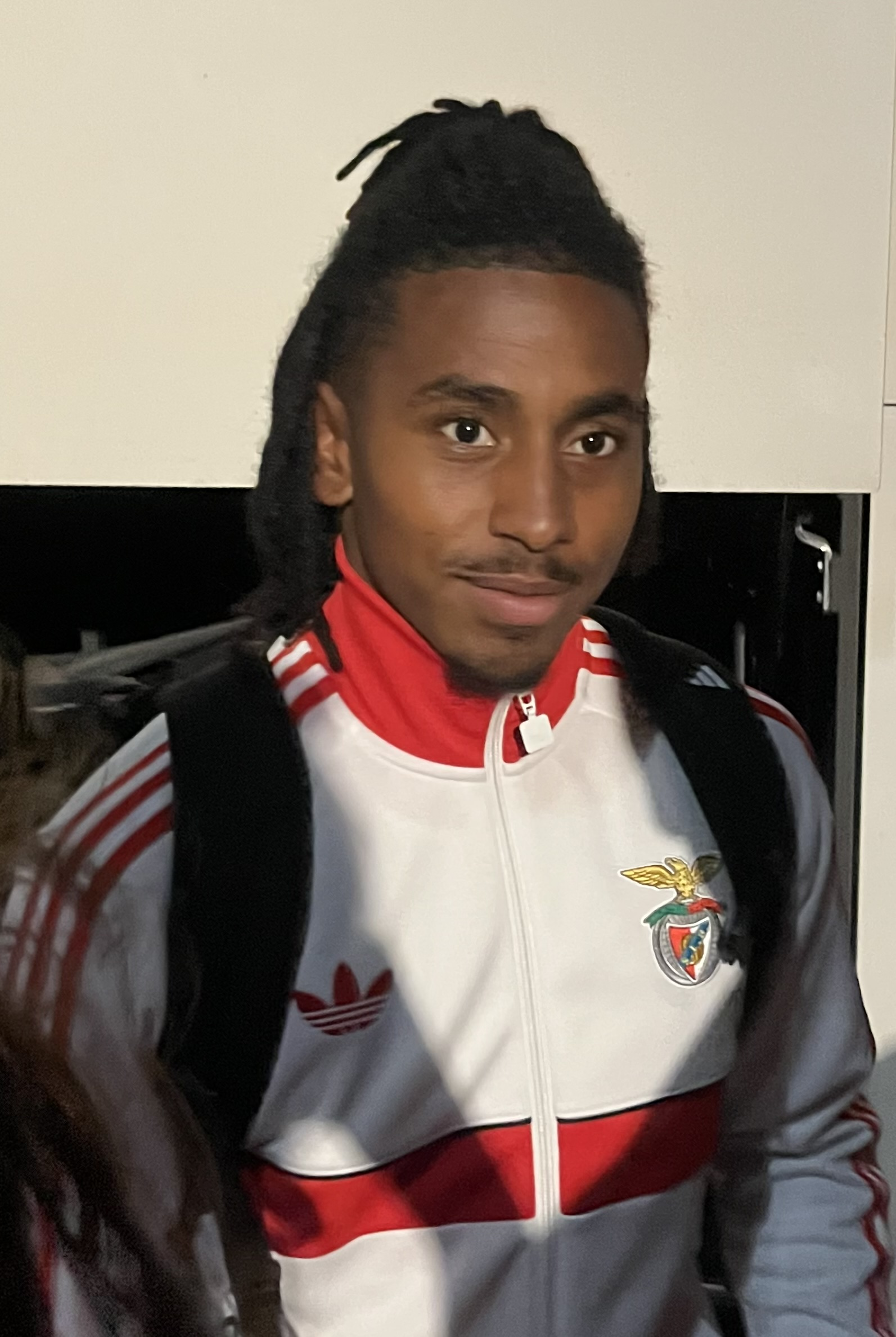
- Barreiro with Benfica in 2026

Personal information
- Full name: Leandro Barreiro Martins
- Date of birth: 3 January 2000 (age 26)
- Place of birth: Erpeldange, Luxembourg
- Height: 1.74 m (5 ft 9 in)
- Position: Midfielder

Team information
- Current team: Benfica
- Number: 18

Youth career
- –2015: Racing-Union
- 2015–2016: Erpeldange
- 2016–2019: Mainz 05

Senior career*
Years	Team	Apps	(Gls)
2019–2024	Mainz 05	141	(11)
2024–	Benfica	60	(6)

International career^{‡}
2016	Luxembourg U17	1	(0)
2017	Luxembourg U19	3	(0)
2017	Luxembourg U21	4	(0)
2018–	Luxembourg	75	(3)
- * Club domestic league appearances and goals as of 23:51, 17 August 2026 (UTC) ‡ National team caps and goals as of 29 September 2026

Leandro Barreiro Martins (born 3 January 2000) is a Luxembourgish professional footballer who plays as a central midfielder for Benfica and the Luxembourg national team.

== Club career ==
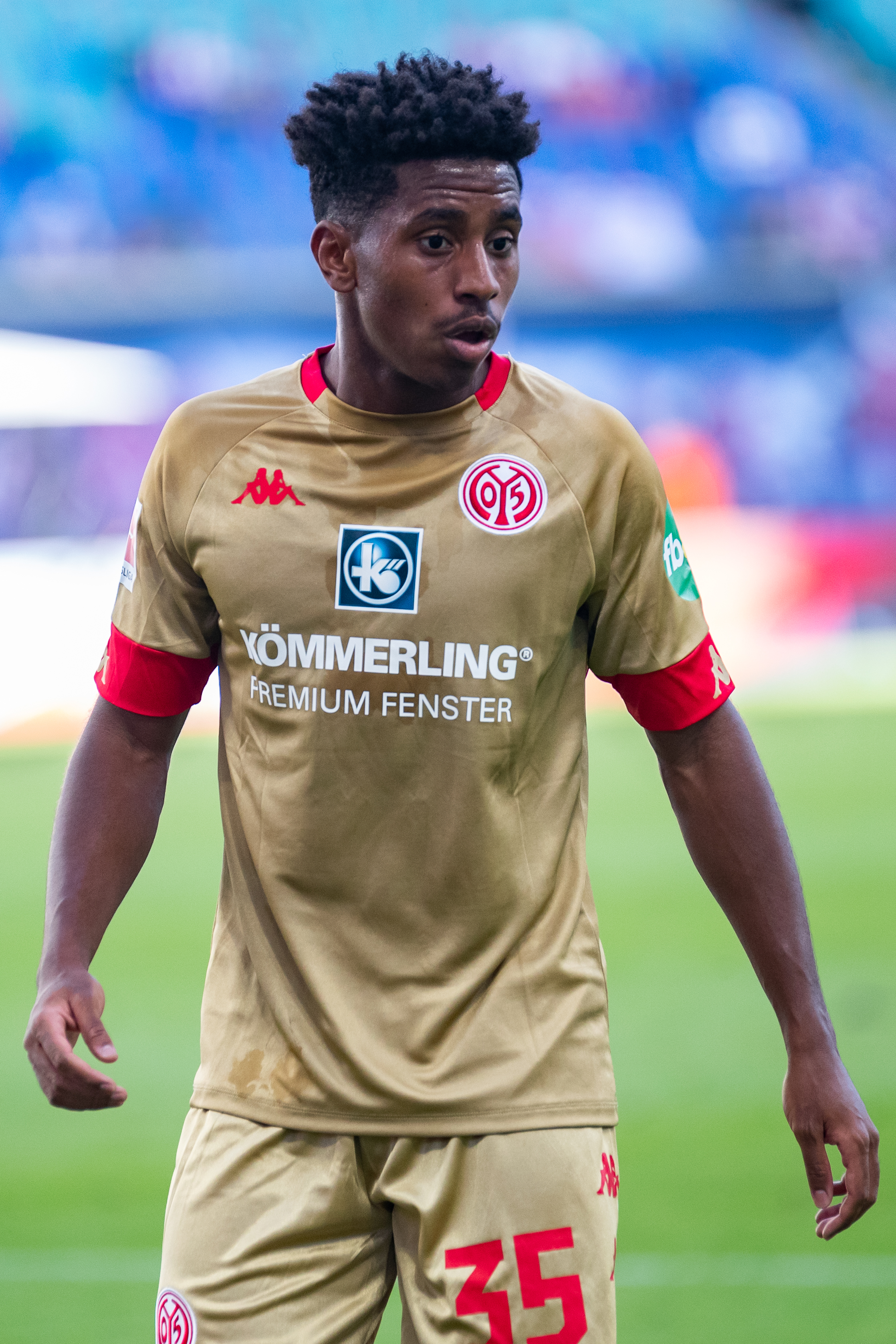
Barreiro with Mainz in 2020

Born in Erpeldange, Luxembourg, Barreiro was a promising youth in the local FC Erpeldange 72 academy. He moved to the Racing FC Union Luxembourg Academy, from where he garnered attention throughout Europe, including from Paris Saint-Germain.

Barreiro signed with Mainz 05 in 2016.

On 4 November 2018, he signed his first professional contract with Mainz. He debuted with Mainz in a 5–1 Bundesliga loss to Bayer Leverkusen on 8 February 2019.

As Barreiro's contract was expiring, rumours that Barreiro would become a Benfica player were confirmed when Benfica's club president Rui Costa claimed "Leandro [Barreiro] is also a Benfica player" on 23 May 2024. Mainz's sporting director further confirmed that Barreiro would sign for the Portuguese outfit.

On 17 January 2025, he netted his first career hat-trick (and was subsequently awarded match MVP), as Benfica won 4–0 at home against Famalicão.

== International career ==
Barreiro was born in Luxembourg and is of Angolan and French descent. Barreiro holds Angolan and French citizenship from his parents. Barreiro made his international debut for the Luxembourg national team in a 1–0 friendly win against Malta on 22 March 2018.

== Career statistics ==
=== Club ===
As of match played 27 August 2026

Appearances and goals by club, season and competition
Club	Season	League			National cup (Note: Includes DFB-Pokal, Taça de Portugal)		League cup (Note: Includes Taça da Liga)		Continental		Other		Total	
Club	Season	Division	Apps	Goals	Apps	Goals	Apps	Goals	Apps	Goals	Apps	Goals	Apps	Goals
Mainz 05	2018–19	Bundesliga	1	0	0	0	—		—		—		1	0
Mainz 05	2019–20	Bundesliga	18	0	0	0	—		—		—		18	0
Mainz 05	2020–21	Bundesliga	29	2	2	0	—		—		—		31	2
Mainz 05	2021–22	Bundesliga	31	1	3	0	—		—		—		34	1
Mainz 05	2022–23	Bundesliga	31	4	3	0	—		—		—		34	4
Mainz 05	2023–24	Bundesliga	31	4	2	0	—		—		—		33	4
Mainz 05	Total		141	11	10	0	—		—		—		151	11
Benfica	2024–25	Primeira Liga	27	3	6	1	1	0	9 (Note: Appearances in UEFA Champions League)	0	4 (Note: Appearances in FIFA Club World Cup)	2	47	6
Benfica	2025–26	Primeira Liga	31	3	3	0	2	0	13	2	1 (Note: Appearance in Supertaça Cândido de Oliveira)	0	50	5
Benfica	2026–27	Primeira Liga	2	0	0	0	0	0	5 (Note: Appearances in UEFA Europa League)	1	—		7	1
Benfica	Total		60	6	9	1	3	0	27	3	5	2	104	12
Career total			201	17	19	1	3	0	27	3	5	2	255	23

=== International ===
As of match played 29 September 2026

Appearances and goals by national team and year
National team	Year	Apps	Goals
Luxembourg	2018	6	0
Luxembourg	2019	10	1
Luxembourg	2020	8	0
Luxembourg	2021	9	0
Luxembourg	2022	10	1
Luxembourg	2023	11	0
Luxembourg	2024	7	0
Luxembourg	2025	10	0
Luxembourg	2026	4	1
Total		75	3

Scores and results list Luxembourg's goal tally first.

List of international goals scored by Leandro Barreiro
No.	Date	Venue	Opponent	Score	Result	Competition
1.	22 March 2019	Stade Josy Barthel, Luxembourg City, Luxembourg	Lithuania	1–1	2–1	UEFA Euro 2020 qualification
2.	14 June 2022	Stade de Luxembourg, Luxembourg City, Luxembourg	Faroe Islands	2–0	2–2	2022–23 UEFA Nations League C
3.	26 September 2026	Hristo Botev Stadium, Plovdiv, Bulgaria	Bulgaria	1–0	2–1	2026–27 UEFA Nations League C

== Honours ==
Benfica

- Taça da Liga: 2024–25
- Supertaça Cândido de Oliveira: 2025
