= Henrique Araújo =

Portuguese footballer (born 2002)

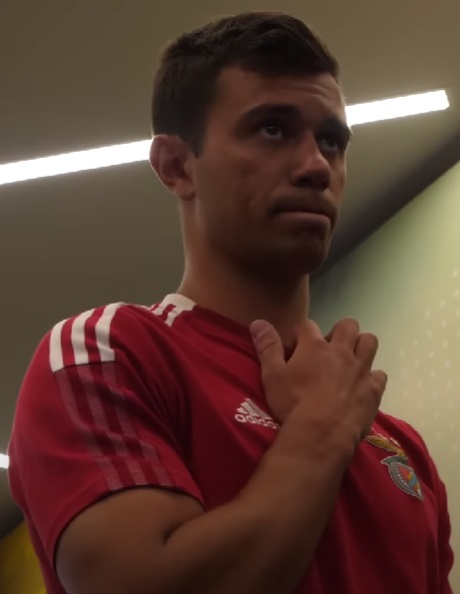
- Araújo with Benfica in 2022

Personal information
- Full name: Henrique Pereira Araújo
- Date of birth: 19 January 2002 (age 24)
- Place of birth: Funchal, Portugal
- Height: 1.82 m (6 ft 0 in)
- Position: Forward

Team information
- Current team: Casa Pia
- Number: 9

Youth career
- 2008–2011: Andorinha
- 2011–2018: Marítimo
- 2018–2022: Benfica

Senior career*
Years	Team	Apps	(Gls)
2020–2026	Benfica B	68	(30)
2022–2026	Benfica	15	(3)
2022–2023	→ Watford (loan)	8	(0)
2023–2024	→ Famalicão (loan)	20	(0)
2024–2025	→ Arouca (loan)	24	(6)
2026–	Casa Pia	5	(0)

International career^{‡}
2019–2020	Portugal U18	6	(4)
2020	Portugal U19	1	(0)
2021–2025	Portugal U21	32	(13)
- * Club domestic league appearances and goals as of 6 September 2026 ‡ National team caps and goals as of 23:58, 7 November 2025 (UTC)

Henrique Pereira Araújo (Portuguese pronunciation: [ẽˈʁiki aɾaˈuʒu]; born 19 January 2002) is a Portuguese professional footballer who plays as a striker for Primeira Liga club Casa Pia.

== Club career ==
=== Early career ===
Born in Funchal, the capital of the Portuguese island of Madeira, Araújo started his football career in the youth ranks of local side Andorinha in 2008, and later moved to Marítimo's in 2011. In 2018, aged 16, he went on a week trial with Benfica, who signed him and he subsequently moved from Madeira to Seixal, near Lisbon, to join Benfica's youth academy, despite also having trained with rivals Porto, who declined signing him.

=== Benfica ===
==== 2020–22: Rise to the first team and UEFA Youth League ====
On 5 March 2019, Araújo signed his first professional contract with Benfica B. Araújo made his professional debut with Benfica B in a 1–0 LigaPro loss to Estoril on 4 October 2020. Following a prolific goalscoring form for the B team, to which he scored ten goals and provided three assist, Araújo was promoted to Benfica's first team by interim manager Nélson Veríssimo, making his debut on 2 February 2022, in a 2–1 home loss to Gil Vicente in the Primeira Liga.

He scored his first goal for the club on 11 March in a 1–1 home draw to Vizela. During that season, Araújo played in the 2021–22 UEFA Youth League, scoring a hat-trick in the final on 25 April, in a 6–0 win over Red Bull Salzburg to help Benfica win their first Youth League title, and their first title in European football since the 1961–62 European Cup. In his first start on 13 May, Araújo scored a brace in a 2–0 away win against Paços de Ferreira. On 5 September, he agreed to a contract extension to 2027, increasing his buyout clause to €100 million.

On 2 November, he scored his first UEFA Champions League goal in a 6–1 away win against Maccabi Haifa in their last 2022–23 UEFA Champions League group stage match, to ensure Benfica's qualification to the round of sixteen, as group winners.

==== 2023: Loan to Watford ====
After making 14 appearances, finding limited first-team minutes, during Benfica's opening half of the season, on 23 January 2023, Araújo joined English Championship club Watford on loan until the rest of the season, in order to continue his development.

==== 2023–24: Loan to Famalicão ====
On 18 July 2023, Primeira Liga club Famalicão announced the signing of Araújo on a season-long loan from Benfica.

== International career ==
Araújo represented Portugal at under-17 and under-19, for a total of 7 caps, scoring four goals. On 7 October 2022, Araújo won his first cap for the under-21 side, replacing Gonçalo Ramos in the 46th minute in the 11–0 victory thrashing of Liechtenstein for the 2023 European Championship qualification campaign.

== Career statistics ==
=== Club ===
As of match played 21 November 2025

Appearances and goals by club, season and competition
Club	Season	League			National cup (Note: Includes Taça de Portugal)		League cup (Note: Includes Taça da Liga)		Europe		Other		Total	
Club	Season	Division	Apps	Goals	Apps	Goals	Apps	Goals	Apps	Goals	Apps	Goals	Apps	Goals
Benfica B	2020–21	Liga Portugal 2	28	11	—		—		—		—		28	11
Benfica B	2021–22	Liga Portugal 2	26	14	—		—		—		—		26	14
Benfica B	2022–23	Liga Portugal 2	6	4	—		—		—		—		6	4
Benfica B	2025–26	Liga Portugal 2	1	0	—		—		—		—		1	0
Benfica B	Total		61	29	—		—		—		—		61	29
Benfica	2021–22	Primeira Liga	5	3	—		1	0	—		—		6	3
Benfica	2022–23	Primeira Liga	5	0	2	0	2	0	5 (Note: Appearance(s) in UEFA Champions League)	2	—		14	2
Benfica	2025–26	Primeira Liga	5	0	1	0	0	0	4	0	1 (Note: Appearance in Supertaça Cândido de Oliveira)	0	11	0
Benfica	Total		15	3	3	0	3	0	9	2	1	0	31	5
Watford (loan)	2022–23	Championship	8	0	—		—		—		—		8	0
Famalicão (loan)	2023–24	Primeira Liga	20	0	1	0	0	0	—		0	0	21	0
Arouca (loan)	2024–25	Primeira Liga	24	6	2	1	0	0	—		0	0	26	7
Career total			128	38	6	1	3	0	9	2	1	0	147	41

== Honours ==
Benfica Youth

- UEFA Youth League: 2021–22

Benfica

- Primeira Liga: 2022–23
- Supertaça Cândido de Oliveira: 2025

Individual

- Liga Portugal 2 Young Player of the Year: 2021–22
- Liga Portugal 2 Forward of the Month: February 2021
- SJPF Segunda Liga Young Player of the Month: February 2021
