= 2025–26 Primeira Liga =

92nd season of top-tier Portuguese football

Primeira Liga
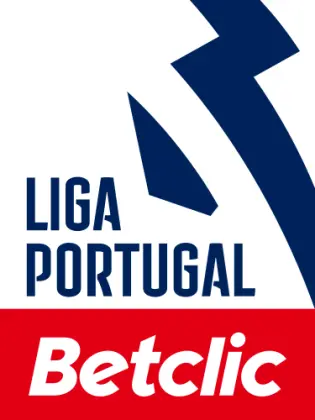
- Season: 2025–26
- Dates: 8 August 2025 – 16 May 2026
- Champions: Porto; 31st title
- Relegated: Tondela; AVS
- Champions League: Porto; Sporting CP
- Europa League: Benfica
- Conference League: Braga
- Matches: 306
- Goals: 821 (2.68 per match)
- Top goalscorer: Luis Suárez (28 goals)
- Biggest home win: Sporting CP 6–0 Arouca (17 August 2025); Sporting CP 6–0 AVS (13 December 2025)
- Biggest away win: Estrela da Amadora 0–5 Estoril (19 January 2026)
- Highest scoring: Casa Pia 3–5 Estrela da Amadora (1 November 2025)
- Longest winning run: 11 matches Porto
- Longest unbeaten run: 34 matches Benfica
- Longest winless run: 21 matches AVS
- Longest losing run: 6 matches AVS; Rio Ave
- Highest attendance: 66,366; Benfica 2–2 Porto (8 March 2026)
- Lowest attendance: 532; Tondela 0–1 Famalicão (16 August 2025)
- Total attendance: 3,665,606 (306 matches)
- Average attendance: 11,979

The 2025–26 Liga Portugal (also known as Liga Portugal Betclic for sponsorship reasons) was the 92nd season of the Primeira Liga, a professional association football competition that serves as the highest level on the Portuguese association football league system clubs and the third season under the current Liga Portugal Betclic title. This was the ninth Primeira Liga season to use video assistant referee (VAR).

Sporting CP were the two-time defending champions, having won their 21st title in the previous season.

== Teams ==
=== Changes ===
The following teams changed division, either exiting or joining Liga Portugal, since the 2024–25 season.

▲ Promoted from Liga Portugal 2	▼ Relegated to Liga Portugal 2	▼ Relegated to Porto Football Association
Tondela; Alverca	Farense	Boavista

=== Location and stadiums ===
Locations of teams in the 2025–26 Primeira Liga.
Locations of teams in the 2025–26 Primeira Liga from the Lisbon area
Locations of teams in the 2025–26 Primeira Liga from Madeira.
Locations of teams in the 2025–26 Primeira Liga from Azores.

Team	Location	Stadium	Capacity	2024–25 season
Alverca^{↑}	Alverca do Ribatejo	Complexo Desportivo FC Alverca	6,932	2nd in LP 2
Arouca	Arouca	Estádio Municipal de Arouca	5,000	12th in PL
AVS	Vila das Aves	Estádio do Clube Desportivo das Aves	6,230	16th in PL
Benfica	Lisbon	Estádio da Luz	68,100	2nd in PL
Braga	Braga	Estádio Municipal de Braga	30,286	4th in PL
Casa Pia	Lisbon	Estádio Municipal de Rio Maior, at Rio Maior (Note: As the Estádio Pina Manique did not meet the standards to host Primeira Liga matches, Casa Pia played their home matches at the Estádio Municipal de Rio Maior in Rio Maior.)	7,000	9th in PL
Estoril Praia	Estoril	Estádio António Coimbra da Mota	5,094	8th in PL
Estrela da Amadora	Amadora	Estádio José Gomes	9,288	15th in PL
Famalicão	Vila Nova de Famalicão	Estádio Municipal de Famalicão	5,186	7th in PL
Gil Vicente	Barcelos	Estádio Cidade de Barcelos	12,046	13th in PL
Moreirense	Guimarães	Estádio Comendador Joaquim de Almeida Freitas	6,150	10th in PL
Nacional	Funchal	Estádio da Madeira	5,200	14th in PL
Porto	Porto	Estádio do Dragão	50,033	3rd in PL
Rio Ave	Vila do Conde	Estadio dos Arcos	5,300	11th in PL
Santa Clara	Ponta Delgada	Estádio de São Miguel	12,500	5th in PL
Sporting CP	Lisbon	Estádio José Alvalade	52,095	1st in PL
Tondela^{↑}	Tondela	Estádio João Cardoso	5,000	1st in LP 2
Vitória de Guimarães	Guimarães	Estádio D. Afonso Henriques	30,029	6th in PL

^{↑}	Promoted from the Liga Portugal 2

League notes:
- PL: Primeira Liga
- LP 2: Liga Portugal 2

=== Personnel and kits ===
Note: Flags indicate national team as has been defined under FIFA eligibility rules. Players and coaches may hold more than one non-FIFA nationality.

Team	Manager	Captain	Kit manufacturer	Main kit sponsor	Other kit sponsor(s)
Alverca	(Portugal national football team) Custódio Castro	(Spain national football team) Sergi Gómez	(United States) Nike	Placard.pt	List: Front: None; Back: Calhambeq; Sleeves: Hospital da Luz; Shorts: None
Arouca	(Portugal national football team) Vasco Seabra	(Portugal national football team) Tiago Esgaio	(Portugal) Skita	Construções Carlos Pinho, Lda.	List: Front: None; Back: Castro Electrónica; Sleeves: None; Shorts: None
AVS	(Portugal national football team) João Henriques	(Brazil national football team) Nenê	(Germany) Adidas	Mercainox	List: Front: Tectoave; Back: GoDrive; Sleeves: None; Shorts: None
Benfica	(Portugal national football team) José Mourinho	(Argentina national football team) Nicolás Otamendi	(Germany) Adidas	Emirates	List: Front: None; Back: Sagres; Sleeves: Betano; Shorts: None
Braga	(Spain national football team) Carlos Vicens	(Portugal national football team) Ricardo Horta	(Germany) Puma	Solverde.pt	List: Front: Só Barroso; Back: AMCO Intermediários de Crédito, Piscinas SOLEO; Sleeves: Tek4life; Shorts: Sabseg Group, 2045 Empresa de Segurança
Casa Pia	(Portugal national football team) Álvaro Pacheco	(Portugal national football team) José Fonte	(Germany) Adidas	ESC Online	List: Front: None; Back: None; Sleeves: None; Shorts: None
Estoril Praia	(Scotland national football team) Ian Cathro	(Portugal national football team) João Carvalho	(Italy) Kappa	Solverde.pt	List: Front: None; Back: None; Sleeves: None; Shorts: None
Estrela da Amadora	(Italy national football team) Cristiano Bacci	(Cape Verde national football team) Jovane Cabral	(England) Umbro	Centro Reciclagem da Amadora	List: Front: None; Back: None; Sleeves: None; Shorts: None
Famalicão	(Portugal national football team) Hugo Oliveira	(Portugal national football team) Gustavo Sá	(Germany) Puma	Placard.pt	List: Front: None; Back: None; Sleeves: None; Shorts: None
Gil Vicente	(Portugal national football team) César Peixoto	(Portugal national football team) Zé Carlos	(Spain) Joma	Goldenpark	List: Front: None; Back: None; Sleeves: None; Shorts: None
Moreirense	(Portugal national football team) Vasco Botelho da Costa	(Portugal national football team) Dinis Pinto	(Spain) CDT	Placard.pt	List: Front: None; Back: None; Sleeves: None; Shorts: None
Nacional	(Portugal national football team) Tiago Margarido	(Portugal national football team) João Aurélio	(Italy) Kappa	Coral Cerveja	List: Front: None; Back: None; Sleeves: None; Shorts: None
Porto	(Italy national football team) Francesco Farioli	(Portugal national football team) Diogo Costa	(United States) New Balance	Betano	List: Front: None; Back: Super Bock; Sleeves: Super Bock (in UEFA matches); Shorts: None
Rio Ave	(Greece national football team) Sotiris Sylaidopoulos	(Albania national football team) Marios Vrousai	(Germany) Adidas	Lebull	List: Front: None; Back: None; Sleeves: None; Shorts: None
Santa Clara	(Portugal national football team) Petit	(Brazil national football team) Gabriel Batista	(England) Umbro	Lebull	List: Front: None; Back: None; Sleeves: None; Shorts: None
Sporting CP	(Portugal national football team) Rui Borges	(Denmark national football team) Morten Hjulmand	(United States) Nike	Betano	List: Front: None; Back: Super Bock; Sleeves: None; Shorts: None
Tondela	(Portugal national football team) Gonçalo Feio	(Cape Verde national football team) Hélder Tavares	(Germany) Puma	Estrella Galicia	List: Front: None; Back: None; Sleeves: None; Shorts: None
Vitória de Guimarães	(Portugal national football team) Gil Lameiras	(Portugal national football team) Samu	(Italy) Macron	Placard.pt	List: Front: None; Back: None; Sleeves: None; Shorts: None

=== Managerial changes ===
==== Pre-season ====
Team	Outgoing manager	Manner of departure	Date of vacancy	Replaced by	Date of appointment
Moreirense	(Italy) Cristiano Bacci	End of contract	19 May 2025	(Portugal) Vasco Botelho da Costa	5 June 2025
Braga	(Portugal) Carlos Carvalhal	Mutual termination	20 May 2025	(Spain) Carlos Vicens	22 May 2025
Alverca	(Portugal) Vasco Botelho da Costa	End of contract	24 May 2025	(Portugal) Custódio Castro	17 June 2025
Rio Ave	(Portugal) Petit	End of contract	17 May 2025	(Greece) Sotiris Sylaidopoulos	27 June 2025
Porto	(Argentina) Martín Anselmi	Sacked	1 July 2025	(Italy) Francesco Farioli	6 July 2025

=== During the season ===
Team	Outgoing manager	Manner of departure	Date of vacancy	Week	Position in table	Replaced by	Date of appointment
AVS	(Portugal) José Mota	Sacked	15 September 2025	5	17th	(Portugal) João Pedro Sousa	23 September 2025
Estrela da Amadora	(Portugal) José Augusto Faria	Sacked	15 September 2025	5	16th	(Portugal national football team) Luís Silva	19 September 2025
Benfica	(Portugal) Bruno Lage	Sacked	17 September 2025	5	4th	(Portugal) José Mourinho	18 September 2025
Estrela da Amadora	(Portugal national football team) Luís Silva	End of caretaker spell	28 September 2025	7	11th	(Portugal national football team) João Nuno	28 September 2025
Casa Pia	(Portugal) João Pereira	Sacked	3 November 2025	10	16th	(Portugal national football team) Gonçalo Brandão	4 November 2025
Tondela	(Portugal) Ivo Vieira	Sacked	11 November 2025	11	17th	(Italy national football team) Cristiano Bacci	13 November 2025
AVS	(Portugal) João Pedro Sousa	Sacked	16 December 2025	14	18th	(Portugal) João Henriques	20 December 2025
Casa Pia	(Portugal national football team) Gonçalo Brandão	End of caretaker spell	8 January 2026	17	15th	(Portugal national football team) Álvaro Pacheco	8 January 2026
Santa Clara	(Portugal national football team) Vasco Matos	Sacked	30 January 2026	20	15th	(Portugal national football team) Petit	3 February 2026
Vitória de Guimarães	(Portugal national football team) Luís Pinto	Sacked	10 March 2026	25	9th	(Portugal national football team) Gil Lameiras	10 March 2026
Tondela	(Italy national football team) Cristiano Bacci	Sacked	22 March 2026	27	17th	(Portugal national football team) Gonçalo Feio	29 March 2026

== Broadcasting ==
Television Rights Holder	Clubs
Benfica TV	Benfica
TVI / V+ TVI	Moreirense
Sport TV	Alverca, Arouca, AVS, Braga, Casa Pia, Estoril Praia, Estrela da Amadora, Famalicão, Gil Vicente, Nacional, Porto, Rio Ave, Santa Clara, Sporting CP, Tondela, Vitória de Guimarães

== Standings ==
=== League table ===
Pos	Team	Pld	W	D	L	GF	GA	GD	Pts	Qualification or relegation
1	Porto (C)	34	28	4	2	66	18	+48	88	Qualification for the Champions League league phase
2	Sporting CP	34	25	7	2	89	24	+65	82	Qualification for the Champions League league phase
3	Benfica	34	23	11	0	74	25	+49	80	Qualification for the Europa League second qualifying round
4	Braga	34	16	11	7	64	36	+28	59	Qualification for the Conference League second qualifying round
5	Famalicão	34	15	11	8	42	29	+13	56	
6	Gil Vicente	34	13	11	10	47	38	+9	50	
7	Moreirense	34	12	7	15	37	49	−12	43	
8	Arouca	34	12	6	16	47	64	−17	42 (Note: Head-to-head points: Arouca 4, Vitória de Guimarães 1.)	
9	Vitória de Guimarães	34	12	6	16	39	51	−12	42	
10	Estoril Praia	34	10	9	15	54	57	−3	39 (Note: Head-to-head points: Estoril Praia 4, Alverca 1.)	
11	Alverca	34	10	9	15	35	52	−17	39	
12	Rio Ave	34	8	12	14	35	57	−22	36 (Note: Head-to-head points: Rio Ave 4, Santa Clara 1.)	
13	Santa Clara	34	9	9	16	32	41	−9	36	
14	Nacional	34	9	7	18	37	45	−8	34	
15	Estrela da Amadora	34	6	12	16	38	56	−18	30 (Note: Head-to-head points: Estrela da Amadora 6, Casa Pia 0.)	
16	Casa Pia (O)	34	6	12	16	31	57	−26	30	Qualification for the relegation play-offs
17	Tondela (R)	34	6	10	18	27	55	−28	28	Relegation to Liga Portugal 2
18	AVS (R)	34	3	12	19	27	67	−40	21	Relegation to Liga Portugal 2

Source: Liga Portugal
Rules for classification: 1) Points; 2) Head-to-head points; 3) Head-to-head goal difference; 4) Goal difference; 5) Matches won; 6) Goals scored; 7) Play-off.
(C) Champions; (O) Play-off winners; (R) Relegated

=== Position by round ===
Team ╲ Round	1	2	3	4	5	6	7	8	9	10	11	12	13	14	15	16	17	18	19	20	21	22	23	24	25	26	27	28	29	30	31	32	33	34
Porto	2	3	2	1	1	1	1	1	1	1	1	1	1	1	1	1	1	1	1	1	1	1	1	1	1	1	1	1	1	1	1	1	1	1
Sporting CP	6	1	1	4	2	2	2	2	2	2	2	2	2	2	2	2	2	2	2	2	2	2	2	2	2	2	2	2	2	3	3	3	2	2
Benfica	11	6	5	2	4	3	3	3	3	3	3	3	3	3	3	3	3	3	3	3	3	3	3	3	3	3	3	3	3	2	2	2	3	3
Braga	3	2	4	6	7	7	7	8	7	7	7	6	5	5	5	5	5	5	4	4	4	5	4	4	4	4	4	4	4	4	4	4	4	4
Famalicão	1	4	6	3	5	6	6	6	5	5	5	5	6	6	6	6	8	7	7	8	6	7	6	6	6	6	5	5	5	5	5	5	5	5
Gil Vicente	5	8	7	7	6	4	5	4	4	4	4	4	4	4	4	4	4	4	5	5	5	4	5	5	5	5	6	6	6	6	6	6	6	6
Moreirense	7	5	3	5	3	5	4	5	6	6	6	7	7	8	7	8	6	6	6	6	8	6	8	7	7	8	8	9	8	7	8	7	7	7
Arouca	4	10	8	8	12	10	10	11	13	15	16	17	17	15	16	16	16	15	15	14	12	12	11	11	11	12	12	11	12	11	11	11	10	8
Vitória de Guimarães	18	9	11	12	8	8	9	7	11	11	8	8	8	7	8	7	7	8	9	9	9	8	9	9	9	9	9	8	9	8	7	8	8	9
Estoril Praia	8	12	14	15	10	12	15	16	15	12	9	10	12	13	9	9	9	9	8	7	7	9	7	8	8	7	7	7	7	9	10	9	9	10
Alverca	12	16	16	16	13	14	12	9	12	14	14	9	9	9	11	12	11	10	10	10	10	10	10	10	10	10	11	10	10	10	9	10	11	11
Rio Ave	10	11	9	9	15	16	16	12	8	10	11	11	10	10	10	11	10	11	12	13	14	15	15	15	14	11	10	12	11	12	12	12	13	12
Santa Clara	17	18	10	11	11	9	8	13	9	8	12	12	11	12	13	14	13	14	14	16	16	16	16	16	16	13	13	13	13	13	13	13	12	13
Nacional	15	14	17	10	14	15	13	10	10	9	10	13	14	11	12	13	14	13	11	11	13	14	14	14	15	16	16	15	15	14	14	14	14	14
Estrela da Amadora	9	13	13	13	16	13	11	15	16	13	13	14	13	14	14	10	12	12	13	12	11	11	12	12	12	14	14	14	14	15	15	15	15	15
Casa Pia	14	7	12	14	9	11	14	14	14	16	15	15	15	16	15	15	15	16	16	15	15	13	13	13	13	15	15	16	16	16	16	16	16	16
Tondela	16	17	18	18	18	17	17	17	17	17	17	16	16	17	17	17	17	17	17	17	17	17	17	17	17	17	17	17	17	17	17	17	17	17
AVS	13	15	15	17	17	18	18	18	18	18	18	18	18	18	18	18	18	18	18	18	18	18	18	18	18	18	18	18	18	18	18	18	18	18

Qualification for the Champions League league phase
Qualification for the Champions League third qualifying round
Qualification for the Europa League second qualifying round
Qualification for the Conference League second qualifying round
Qualification for the Relegation play-off
Relegation to the Liga Portugal 2

Source: Liga Portugal

== Results ==
=== Fixture and results ===
Home \ Away	ALV	FCA	AVS	SLB	SCB	CPA	EPF	CFE	FCF	GVF	MFC	CDN	FCP	RAF	STC	SCP	CDT	VSC
Alverca		2–1	0–0	1–2	0–3	3–1	1–1	1–1	1–0	0–4	2–1	1–0	0–3	1–1	1–1	1–4	1–0	2–0
Arouca	1–0		3–1	1–2	0–4	0–2	3–2	1–0	1–1	2–2	0–2	3–0	0–4	3–3	2–2	1–2	3–1	3–2
AVS	1–3	0–1		0–3	0–4	0–2	3–0	0–0	0–1	1–1	0–2	2–2	3–1	1–2	0–1	1–1	2–2	1–1
Benfica	2–1	5–0	3–0		2–2	2–2	3–1	4–0	1–0	2–1	4–1	2–0	2–2	1–1	1–1	1–1	3–0	3–0
Braga	5–0	1–0	2–2	2–2		4–0	1–1	2–2	2–2	0–1	2–1	0–1	1–2	3–0	1–0	2–2	3–0	3–2
Casa Pia	0–2	3–2	3–3	1–1	0–1		2–2	3–5	1–1	1–1	1–1	0–2	2–1	1–1	0–0	0–2	0–1	0–0
Estoril Praia	4–1	4–3	3–1	1–3	1–0	0–0		1–1	0–1	3–1	3–3	1–1	1–3	1–2	0–1	0–1	2–2	4–2
Estrela da Amadora	2–2	3–1	3–0	0–1	3–3	4–0	0–5		0–0	2–2	0–0	1–1	1–2	1–2	1–0	0–1	0–2	0–2
Famalicão	1–0	1–0	3–1	2–2	1–2	2–0	4–0	2–3		0–0	1–1	1–0	0–1	0–0	3–0	1–2	3–0	2–0
Gil Vicente	2–2	1–3	3–0	1–2	2–1	2–1	2–0	2–0	5–0		2–0	2–1	0–2	2–2	1–0	1–1	0–1	0–1
Moreirense	2–1	0–1	0–0	0–4	0–1	2–1	1–0	3–2	2–2	1–2		1–1	1–2	3–1	1–0	0–3	1–0	2–0
Nacional	1–0	1–2	1–2	1–2	1–2	0–0	0–1	2–0	0–1	0–2	3–2		0–1	4–0	3–3	1–4	3–1	2–0
Porto	1–0	3–1	2–0	0–0	2–1	4–0	1–0	3–1	2–2	3–0	3–0	1–0		1–0	1–0	1–1	2–0	3–0
Rio Ave	1–2	0–3	2–2	0–2	2–2	3–1	0–4	2–1	0–0	0–0	1–2	1–1	0–3		1–1	1–4	3–0	0–1
Santa Clara	2–1	0–0	2–0	1–2	2–1	1–0	2–4	0–0	0–1	1–0	0–1	2–0	0–1	0–2		1–2	1–2	2–0
Sporting CP	2–0	6–0	6–0	1–2	1–1	3–0	3–0	4–0	1–0	3–0	3–0	2–1	1–2	4–0	4–2		2–2	5–1
Tondela	1–1	3–1	0–0	0–0	0–1	1–2	2–2	0–0	0–1	2–2	2–0	0–2	0–2	0–1	2–2	0–3		0–1
Vitória de Guimarães	1–1	1–1	4–0	0–3	1–1	0–1	3–2	2–1	1–2	0–0	1–0	2–1	0–1	2–0	2–1	1–4	5–0	

Source: Liga Portugal
Legend: Blue = home team win; Yellow = draw; Red = away team win.
For upcoming matches, an "a" indicates there is an article about the rivalry between the two participants.

=== Results by round ===
Team ╲ Round	1	2	3	4	5	6	7	8	9	10	11	12	13	14	15	16	17	18	19	20	21	22	23	24	25	26	27	28	29	30	31	32	33	34
Alverca	L	L	D	L	W	L	W	W	L	L	D	W	W	L	L	L	W	W	L	D	L	D	D	D	D	D	L	W	W	W	W	L	D	L
Arouca	W	L	D	D	L	W	L	D	L	L	L	L	L	W	D	D	L	W	L	W	W	L	W	L	L	L	W	W	L	L	L	D	W	W
AVS	L	L	D	L	L	L	L	L	L	D	D	L	L	L	D	L	L	L	D	L	L	W	L	D	D	L	D	L	D	D	D	W	W	D
Benfica	W	W	W	D	W	D	W	D	W	W	D	W	D	W	W	D	W	W	W	D	W	W	W	W	D	W	W	D	W	W	W	D	D	W
Braga	W	W	D	D	L	D	L	D	W	L	W	W	W	W	L	D	D	W	W	W	W	L	W	W	D	L	W	W	D	W	L	D	D	D
Casa Pia	L	W	L	L	W	D	L	D	L	L	D	L	L	D	W	D	L	L	D	W	D	W	L	D	D	L	D	L	D	L	L	L	W	D
Estoril Praia	D	L	D	L	W	L	L	D	D	W	W	L	D	L	W	W	L	W	W	W	D	L	W	L	D	W	L	L	L	L	L	D	D	L
Estrela da Amadora	D	L	D	D	L	D	W	L	L	W	D	L	W	L	D	W	D	L	L	D	W	L	L	D	D	L	W	L	L	L	L	L	D	D
Famalicão	W	W	D	W	L	D	D	D	W	W	L	D	L	W	L	L	L	W	W	L	W	L	W	D	W	W	W	D	D	W	W	D	D	W
Gil Vicente	W	L	D	W	W	W	L	W	W	W	D	L	D	D	D	D	D	W	L	W	W	W	L	L	D	D	L	W	D	W	W	D	L	L
Moreirense	W	W	W	L	W	L	W	L	L	W	L	D	D	L	D	W	W	L	W	L	L	W	L	D	D	L	L	L	D	L	L	W	L	D
Nacional	L	D	L	W	L	L	W	W	D	L	D	L	L	W	D	D	L	L	W	L	D	L	L	L	D	L	L	W	L	W	W	L	L	W
Porto	W	W	W	W	W	W	W	D	W	W	W	W	W	W	W	W	W	W	W	L	D	W	W	W	D	W	W	D	W	W	W	W	L	W
Rio Ave	D	D	D	L	L	D	D	W	W	L	D	D	W	L	D	L	W	L	L	L	L	L	L	D	W	W	W	L	W	D	L	D	L	D
Santa Clara	L	L	D	W	D	W	L	L	W	L	L	D	W	L	D	L	D	L	L	L	L	L	D	D	W	W	W	L	L	D	W	D	W	L
Sporting CP	W	W	W	L	W	W	W	D	W	W	W	W	D	W	W	W	D	W	W	W	D	W	W	W	D	W	W	W	L	D	D	W	W	W
Tondela	L	L	L	D	L	D	W	L	L	D	L	W	L	L	L	W	L	L	L	D	D	D	W	D	L	D	L	D	L	L	D	W	W	L
Vitória de Guimarães	L	W	L	D	W	D	L	W	L	L	W	W	D	W	L	D	W	L	L	W	L	W	L	D	L	L	L	W	D	W	W	L	L	L

Source: Liga Portugal

== Relegation play-offs ==
The relegation play-offs took place between Casa Pia, who finished 16th in the Primeira Liga, and Torreense, who finished 3rd in Liga Portugal 2.

All times are WEST (UTC+1).

Team 1	Agg.	Team 2	1st leg	2nd leg
Torreense	0–2	Casa Pia	0–0	0–2

1st leg

20 May 2026
18:00 UTC+1

Torreense	0–0	Casa Pia
	Report

Estádio Manuel Marques, Torres Vedras
Attendance: 2,232
Referee: David Silva

2nd leg

28 May 2026
20:00 UTC+1

Casa Pia	2–0	Torreense
Larrazabal 38'; Ofori 77'	Report

Estádio Municipal de Rio Maior, Rio Maior
Attendance: 1,946
Referee: Fábio Veríssimo

Casa Pia won 2–0 on aggregate, and therefore both clubs remained in their respective leagues.

== Season statistics ==
=== Top goalscorers ===
Rank	Player	Club	Goals
1	(Colombia) Luis Suárez	Sporting	28
2	(Greece) Vangelis Pavlidis	Benfica	22
3	(Morocco) Yanis Begraoui	Estoril	20
4	(Venezuela) Jesús Ramírez	Nacional	18
5	(Uruguay) Rodrigo Zalazar	Braga	16
6	(Portugal) Ricardo Horta	Braga	14
7	(Spain) Samu Aghehowa	Porto	13
7	(Portugal) Pedro Gonçalves	Sporting	13
9	(Brazil) Murilo Costa	Gil Vicente	11
10	(Brazil) Clayton	Rio Ave	10
10	(Portugal) Pablo	Gil Vicente	10
10	(Spain) Pau Víctor	Braga	10

==== Hat-tricks ====
Player	For	Against	Result	Date
(Portugal) Pedro Gonçalves	Sporting	Nacional	4–1 (A)	23 August 2025
(Greece) Vangelis Pavlidis	Benfica	Arouca	5–0 (H)	25 October 2025
(Morocco) Yanis Begraoui	Estoril	Rio Ave	4–0 (A)	1 November 2025
(Cape Verde) Sidny Cabral	Estrela da Amadora	Casa Pia	5–3 (A)	1 November 2025
(Greece) Vangelis Pavlidis	Benfica	Moreirense	4–0 (A)	14 December 2025
(Colombia) Luis Suárez	Sporting	Rio Ave	4–0 (H)	28 December 2025
(Greece) Vangelis Pavlidis	Benfica	Estoril	3–1 (H)	3 January 2026
(Venezuela) Jesús Ramírez	Nacional	Santa Clara	3–3 (H)	11 January 2026
(Morocco) Yanis Begraoui	Estoril	Estrela da Amadora	5–0 (A)	19 January 2026

Notes

(H) – Home team
(A) – Away team

=== Clean sheets ===
Rank	Player	Club	Clean sheets
1	(Portugal) Diogo Costa	Porto	21
2	(Montenegro) Lazar Carević	Famalicão	17
3	(Portugal) Rui Silva	Sporting	14
4	(Ukraine) Anatoliy Trubin	Benfica	13
5	(Czech Republic) Lukáš Horníček	Braga	12

=== Discipline ===
==== Player ====
- Most yellow cards: 13
  - (Brazil) David Sousa (Casa Pia)
- Most red cards: 3
  - (Spain) José Fontán (Arouca)

==== Club ====
- Most yellow cards: 95
  - Casa Pia
- Most red cards: 10
  - Arouca

== Awards ==
=== Monthly awards ===
Month	Player of the Month		Young Player of the Month		Goalkeeper of the Month		Defender of the Month		Midfielder of the Month		Forward of the Month		Manager of the Month		Goal of the Month		References
Month	Player	Club	Player	Club	Player	Club	Player	Club	Player	Club	Player	Club	Manager	Club	Player	Club	References
August	(Denmark) Victor Froholdt	Porto	(Denmark) Victor Froholdt	Porto	(Montenegro) Lazar Carević	Famalicão	(Netherlands) Justin de Haas	Famalicão	(Denmark) Victor Froholdt	Porto	(Brazil) Clayton	Rio Ave	(Italy) Francesco Farioli	Porto	(Brazil) William Gomes	Porto	
September/October	(Portugal) Pablo	Gil Vicente	(Portugal) Pablo	Gil Vicente	(Brazil) Andrew	Gil Vicente	(Poland) Jan Bednarek	Porto	(Portugal) Pedro Gonçalves	Sporting	(Portugal) Pablo	Gil Vicente	(Portugal) César Peixoto	Gil Vicente	(Serbia) Matija Mitrović	Vitória de Guimarães	
November	(Portugal) Francisco Trincão	Sporting	(Portugal) Geovany Quenda	Sporting	(Brazil) Andrew	Gil Vicente	(Poland) Jan Bednarek	Porto	(Denmark) Morten Hjulmand	Sporting	(Portugal) Francisco Trincão	Sporting	(Portugal) Rui Borges	Sporting	(Ukraine) Heorhiy Sudakov	Benfica	
December	(Greece) Vangelis Pavlidis	Benfica	(Portugal) Noah Saviolo	Vitória de Guimarães	(Portugal) Diogo Costa	Porto	(Poland) Jan Bednarek	Porto	(Uruguay) Rodrigo Zalazar	Braga	(Greece) Vangelis Pavlidis	Benfica	(Italy) Francesco Farioli	Porto	(Spain) Borja Sainz	Porto	
January	(Colombia) Luis Suárez	Sporting	(Portugal) Noah Saviolo	Vitória de Guimarães	(Czech Republic) Lukáš Horníček	Braga	(Brazil) Maracás	Moreirense	(Portugal) João Carvalho	Estoril	(Colombia) Luis Suárez	Sporting	(Scotland) Ian Cathro	Estoril	(Serbia) Matija Mitrović	Vitória de Guimarães	
February	(Colombia) Luis Suárez	Sporting	(Norway) Andreas Schjelderup	Benfica	(Czech Republic) Lukáš Horníček	Braga	(Poland) Jan Bednarek	Porto	(Uruguay) Rodrigo Zalazar	Braga	(Colombia) Luis Suárez	Sporting	(Portugal) Rui Borges	Sporting	(Mozambique) Geny Catamo	Sporting	
March	(Spain) Jalen Blesa	Rio Ave	(Portugal) Gustavo Sá	Famalicão	(Montenegro) Lazar Carević	Famalicão	(Senegal) Ibrahima Ba	Famalicão	(Uruguay) Rodrigo Zalazar	Braga	(Spain) Jalen Blesa	Rio Ave	(Portugal) Hugo Oliveira	Famalicão	(Portugal) Rodrigo Pinheiro	Famalicão	
April	(Norway) Andreas Schjelderup	Benfica	(Norway) Andreas Schjelderup	Benfica	(Portugal) Diogo Costa	Porto	(Poland) Jan Bednarek	Porto	(Denmark) Victor Froholdt	Porto	(Norway) Andreas Schjelderup	Benfica	(Italy) Francesco Farioli	Porto	(Brazil) Gustavo Silva	Vitória de Guimarães	
May	—N/a														(Portugal) Daniel Bragança	Sporting	

=== Annual awards ===
Award	Winner	Club
Player of the Season	(Denmark) Victor Froholdt	Porto
Manager of the Season	(Italy) Francesco Farioli	Porto
Top scorer	(Colombia) Luis Suárez	Sporting
Young Player of the Season	(Denmark) Victor Froholdt	Porto
Goal of the Season	(Brazil) William Gomes	Porto

Team of the Season

Team of the Season
Goalkeeper	(Portugal) Diogo Costa (Porto)			
Defence	(Portugal) Alberto Costa (Porto)	(Poland) Jan Bednarek (Porto)	(Poland) Jakub Kiwior (Porto)	(Uruguay) Maximiliano Araújo (Sporting)
Midfield	(Uruguay) Rodrigo Zalazar (Braga)	(Denmark) Morten Hjulmand (Sporting)		(Denmark) Victor Froholdt (Porto)
Attack	(Portugal) Francisco Trincão (Sporting)	(Colombia) Luis Suárez (Sporting)		(Portugal) Ricardo Horta (Braga)

== Attendances ==
=== Overall ===
Primeira Liga clubs listed by average home league attendance:

Pos	Club	Average attendance
1	Benfica	58,690
2	FC Porto	45,611
3	Sporting Portugal	42,408
4	Vitória SC	16,557
5	SC Braga	14,602
6	Gil Vicente FC	6,601
7	FC Famalicão	3,776
8	Estrela da Amadora	3,353
9	Estoril Praia	2,810
10	FC Alverca	2,752
11	Rio Ave FC	2,700
12	Moreirense	2,606
13	CD Nacional	2,458
14	CD Tondela	2,423
15	CD Santa Clara	2,303
16	Casa Pia AC	2,075
17	FC Arouca	1,990
18	AVS	1,909

=== Home match played ===
As of Matchday 34

Team \ Match played	1	2	3	4	5	6	7	8	9	10	11	12	13	14	15	16	17	Total
Alverca	2,776	6,532	2,037	2,877	2,008	1,645	1,396	5,634	1,454	1,498	1,845	1,702	1,829	6,664	1,894	1,958	3,031	46,780
Arouca	2,003	1,733	1,358	4,192	1,491	1,249	1,447	856	1,903	3,142	1,355	1,242	4,428	1,419	1,804	1,528	2,642	33,792
AVS	1,225	1,633	5,416	1,100	1,050	1,551	1,027	843	1,754	987	1,140	928	1,150	1,120	2,714	3,567	5,254	32,459
Benfica	61,229	59,507	57,059	57,358	60,322	56,428	65,247	57,894	59,865	54,548	49,311	58,784	66,366	60,634	56,594	56,591	60,001	997,738
Braga	17,174	15,078	14,118	13,502	11,384	10,290	5,369	24,314	8,410	10,528	20,118	22,883	25,611	12,449	12,911	11,858	12,232	248,229
Casa Pia	6,981	1,351	1,011	1,145	1,214	1,127	1,033	1,574	914	3,296	1,037	1,842	6,113	1,279	1,753	1,373	2,232	35,275
Estoril Praia	2,781	1,852	1,752	4,882	2,687	1,856	1,964	2,334	1,948	2,176	2,072	3,194	2,349	2,963	4,968	3,286	4,703	47,767
Estrela da Amadora	6,249	3,411	3,044	1,712	1,827	2,658	3,019	1,614	2,133	2,826	1,498	2,863	3,674	1,833	7,102	7,174	4,371	57,008
Famalicão	4,300	4,571	4,887	3,865	4,384	4,906	2,561	3,366	3,989	2,529	1,141	3,300	2,684	3,912	4,060	4,940	4,805	64,200
Gil Vicente	11,066	5,693	7,259	4,960	5,475	4,538	4,187	8,956	5,209	5,745	7,542	11,022	5,143	6,070	7,947	6,439	4,972	112,223
Moreirense	2,550	4,210	1,683	1,821	5,658	1,999	5,518	1,952	1,290	1,729	5,230	1,524	1,359	2,810	1,918	1,376	1,679	44,306
Nacional	1,663	4,394	1,529	1,678	1,882	4,826	1,082	2,068	1,877	1,881	4,926	2,083	1,944	2,099	2,276	2,687	2,894	41,789
Porto	48,534	49,045	47,285	49,520	48,473	45,092	31,247	48,097	34,273	49,378	44,810	41,090	44,672	47,562	46,755	49,561	50,002	775,396
Rio Ave	2,452	3,250	4,624	2,066	2,039	2,098	2,521	2,067	4,435	1,842	2,041	2,595	2,885	2,284	2,158	2,801	3,747	45,905
Santa Clara	1,695	1,938	1,684	1,808	1,071	5,970	861	2,029	5,338	1,525	1,162	7,184	1,362	1,027	1,565	1,728	1,204	39,151
Sporting CP	41,986	50,946	41,710	46,331	31,833	43,722	38,713	47,032	34,975	39,984	46,164	46,112	46,473	51,470	32,836	32,439	48,204	720,930
Tondela	532	2,226	1,897	4,519	2,718	4,133	1,673	1,812	2,476	4,568	1,468	2,474	1,766	1,897	1,673	2,574	2,784	41,190
Vitória de Guimarães	18,926	14,128	25,114	14,224	26,127	11,976	13,126	25,097	13,955	28,526	10,826	13,465	14,026	14,128	13,936	13,766	10,122	281,468
League total																		3,665,606

Source: Liga Portugal

== Number of teams by district ==
Rank	District Football Associations	Number	Teams
1	Lisbon	6	Alverca, Benfica, Casa Pia, Estoril Praia, Estrela da Amadora and Sporting CP
2	Braga	5	Braga, Famalicão, Gil Vicente, Moreirense and Vitória de Guimarães
3	Porto	3	AVS, Porto and Rio Ave
4	Aveiro	1	Arouca
4	Madeira	1	Nacional
4	Ponta Delgada	1	Santa Clara
4	Viseu	1	Tondela

== See also ==
- 2025–26 Liga Portugal 2
- 2025–26 Liga 3
- 2025–26 Campeonato de Portugal
- 2025–26 Taça da Liga
- 2025–26 Taça de Portugal
