= Ricardo (footballer, born 1980) =

Cape Verdean footballer

Personal information
- Full name: Ricardo Jorge Ferreira Pinto da Silva
- Date of birth: 19 August 1980 (age 46)
- Place of birth: Azurém, Portugal
- Height: 1.85 m (6 ft 1 in)
- Position: Defender

Team information
- Current team: Famalicão (manager)

Youth career
- Famalicão
- 1996–1999: Vitória Guimarães

Senior career*
Years	Team	Apps	(Gls)
1999–2000	Ronfe		
2000–2001	Serzedelo		
2001–2002	Famalicão	26	(0)
2002–2004	Freamunde	63	(5)
2004–2008	Beira-Mar	103	(1)
2008–2010	Paços Ferreira	54	(6)
2010–2011	Vitória Guimarães	17	(0)
2011–2012	Shandong Luneng	18	(0)
2012–2018	Paços Ferreira	140	(2)
2018–2019	Famalicão	32	(0)
2019–2020	Feirense	15	(0)
Total		468+	(14+)

International career
2007–2016	Cape Verde	16	(1)

Managerial career
- 2020–2021: Trofense (assistant)
- 2021–2026: Famalicão (assistant)
- 2024: Famalicão (caretaker)
- 2026: Famalicão (caretaker)
- 2026–: Famalicão
- * Club domestic league appearances and goals

Ricardo Jorge Ferreira Pinto da Silva (born 19 August 1980), known simply as Ricardo, is a Cape Verdean former professional footballer who played as a central defender and a right-back. He is currently manager of Primeira Liga club Famalicão.

== Club career ==
Ricardo was born in Azurém, Guimarães, Portugal, and started playing football with amateurs Centro de Cultura e Desporto Desportivo de Ronfe and G.D. Serzedelo. In the following three years he competed in the third division, representing F.C. Famalicão (one season) and S.C. Freamunde (two).

In the summer of 2004, Ricardo moved straight to the Primeira Liga, signing with S.C. Beira-Mar. He featured in 29 games in his first season (24 starts), but suffered relegation; he continued to appear regularly for the Aveiro team during his spell, spending two years apiece in each of Portugal's major levels.

Ricardo returned to the top flight for 2008–09, joining F.C. Paços de Ferreira. In the following campaign's first round, he scored with his head to earn his side a point against FC Porto in a 1–1 home draw.

In June 2010, Ricardo signed with Vitória de Guimarães also of the top tier – he had been brought up as a youth at the Minho club. In January 2012, after a brief spell in China, he returned to Portugal and Paços on a three-and-a-half-year contract.

Ricardo retired at the end of 2019–20 aged 39, after one-season spells in the LigaPro with Famalicão and C.D. Feirense.

== International career ==
Although born in Portugal, Ricardo opted to represent Cape Verde through ancestry. He received his first call-up in May 2008, first appearing on 27 May in a friendly with Luxembourg.

In June 2010, Ricardo started in the 0–0 draw that the minnows (ranked 117th) managed against Portugal, as the Europeans were preparing for that year's FIFA World Cup.

== Coaching career ==
After retiring, Ricardo worked as an assistant at C.D. Trofense and Famalicão, being named caretaker manager at the latter in December 2024 in place of Armando Evangelista. He returned to his previous role when Hugo Oliveira was appointed, only to return on an interim basis in October 2026 following Carlos Carvalhal's dismissal.

On 11 November 2026, Ricardo was confirmed as manager of Famalicão.
