= Carlos Carvalhal =

Portuguese football manager and former player (born 1965)

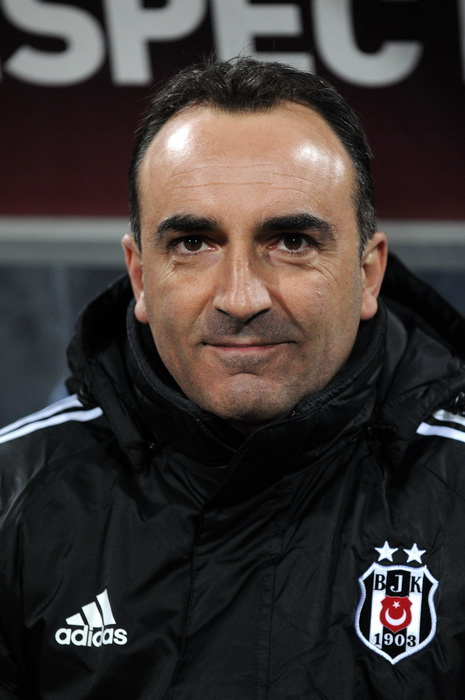
- Carvalhal with Beşiktaş in 2011

Personal information
- Full name: Carlos Augusto Soares da Costa Faria Carvalhal
- Date of birth: 4 December 1965 (age 60)
- Place of birth: Braga, Portugal
- Height: 1.78 m (5 ft 10 in)
- Position: Centre-back

Youth career
- 1978–1983: Braga

Senior career*
Years	Team	Apps	(Gls)
1983–1985	Braga	7	(0)
1985–1986	Chaves	28	(0)
1986–1988	Braga	60	(1)
1988–1989	Porto	1	(0)
1989–1990	Beira-Mar	23	(0)
1990–1992	Braga	33	(0)
1992–1993	Tirsense	14	(0)
1993–1995	Chaves	44	(3)
1995–1999	Espinho	49	(0)
Total		259	(4)

International career
1985–1987	Portugal U21	9	(0)

Managerial career
- 1998–1999: Espinho
- 1999–2000: Freamunde
- 2000: Vizela
- 2000–2001: Aves
- 2001–2002: Leixões
- 2003–2004: Vitória Setúbal
- 2004–2005: Belenenses
- 2006: Braga
- 2006–2007: Beira-Mar
- 2007–2008: Vitória Setúbal
- 2008: Asteras Tripolis
- 2009: Marítimo
- 2009–2010: Sporting CP
- 2011–2012: Beşiktaş
- 2012: İstanbul Başakşehir
- 2015–2017: Sheffield Wednesday
- 2017–2018: Swansea City
- 2019–2020: Rio Ave
- 2020–2022: Braga
- 2022: Al Wahda
- 2022–2023: Celta
- 2023–2024: Olympiacos
- 2024–2025: Braga
- 2026: Famalicão
- * Club domestic league appearances and goals

Carlos Augusto Soares da Costa Faria Carvalhal (Portuguese pronunciation: [ˈkaɾluʃ kɐɾvɐˈʎal]; born 4 December 1965) is a Portuguese former professional footballer who played as a centre-back. He is currently a manager.

As a player, he totalled 197 Primeira Liga appearances in service of six clubs, including three stints at Braga and two at Chaves, as well as a single game for Porto.

In a managerial career of over two decades, Carvalhal led nine teams in Portugal's top flight, including Braga three times, winning the Taça de Portugal in 2021. He reached the same final with Leixões in 2002 and won the Taça da Liga with Vitória de Setúbal in 2008. Abroad, he had spells in Greece, Turkey, England, Wales, the United Arab Emirates and Spain.

== Playing career ==
Born in Braga, Carvalhal represented mainly his hometown's Braga during his career. In the 1987–88 campaign, in one of his three spells at the club, he had one of his best years in the Primeira Liga, appearing in 34 games and only being booked seven times, even though the Minho team could only finish in 11th position.

Immediately afterwards, Carvalhal joined Porto, but was released after only one year, going on to represent in the following nine seasons – until his retirement at the age of 32 – Beira-Mar, Braga, Tirsense, Chaves and Espinho.

== Coaching career ==
=== Early career ===
Carvalhal began managing at his last club Espinho, in the Segunda Liga, being dismissed early into his second year. In 2002, he became the first coach in the country to take a team in the third division to the UEFA Cup, after leading Leixões to the final of the Taça de Portugal. Two years later, he helped Vitória de Setúbal back to the top flight, which prompted his move to a side in that tier, Belenenses.

Carvalhal was sacked by Belenenses early into 2005–06, after five defeats in eight games. He met the same fate with the two teams he coached the following season, Braga and Beira-Mar. With the latter, he was dismissed in December 2006 after the Aveiro club signed a cooperation deal with Inverfutbol, a Spanish-based sporting company, in a relegation-ending campaign.

Returning to Setúbal for 2007–08, Carvalhal enjoyed his best year as a manager. He led the Sadinos to the sixth position in the league – with the subsequent UEFA Cup qualification and with the team posting one of the best defensive records in Europe that year – and victory in the inaugural edition of the Taça da Liga, against Sporting CP.

=== Marítimo and Sporting CP ===
In May 2008, Carvalhal accepted the first foreign job of his career at Asteras Tripolis of Super League Greece, signing a two-year contract worth an annual salary of €500,000. He left by mutual consent in November with the club in 12th, having been warned by compatriot José Peseiro about the precarious nature of management in the Mediterranean country.

Carvalhal returned to Portugal and joined Marítimo, only winning one match in 11 but with the Madeira side finishing comfortably in mid-table. He was relieved of his duties late into the year 2009, moving to Sporting in mid-November to replace the fired Paulo Bento.

As originally intended, Carvalhal left his post at the end of the season, with Sporting finishing in fourth position, 28 points behind champions Benfica.

=== Turkey ===
On 2 August 2011, Carvalhal was appointed as caretaker manager of Beşiktaş from Turkey, as incumbent Tayfur Havutçu resolved his legal issues stemming from the 2011 Turkish sports corruption scandal. At the start of the following April, with the team trailing Galatasaray by 20 points and him having fallen out with compatriot star player Ricardo Quaresma, he was relieved of his duties and replaced by his predecessor.

Remaining in the same city, Carvalhal joined İstanbul Başakşehir also of the Süper Lig in May 2012. He resigned on 12 November, as they were in 14th place.

=== Sheffield Wednesday ===
On 30 June 2015, after nearly three years of inactivity, Carvalhal was appointed head coach of English Championship club Sheffield Wednesday. He led the team to sixth position in his debut campaign and, subsequently, qualified them for the play-offs, ultimately losing in the play-off final at Wembley. Another notable achievement in his first season in England was ousting Arsenal in the fourth round of the Football League Cup, with a 3–0 victory.

In May 2017, after leading Wednesday to a fourth-place league finish, Carvalhal became the first Portuguese to win the EFL Championship Manager of the Month award. He subsequently coached them to the play-offs, where they were defeated by Huddersfield Town on penalties.

Carvalhal left by mutual consent on 24 December 2017, as the side ranked in the lower half of the table.

=== Swansea City ===
On 28 December 2017, four days after leaving Sheffield Wednesday, Carvalhal moved to the Premier League with Swansea City following the sacking of Paul Clement the previous week. His first game in charge took place late in the month, and he led his team to a 2–1 away win over Watford, led by compatriot Marco Silva. After two consecutive league home victories against Liverpool (1–0) and Arsenal (3–1), he was nominated for his first Premier League Manager of the Month award for the month of January.

On 18 May 2018, after the club's relegation, Carvalhal left the Liberty Stadium.

=== Return to Portugal ===
Carvalhal returned to Portugal one year later, being named Rio Ave's coach, In his only season, he led the team from Vila do Conde to Europa League qualification in fifth place, along with a best-ever points tally of 55.

On 28 July 2020, two days after leaving Rio Ave, Carvalhal signed a two-year contract at Braga, returning to the Estádio Municipal de Braga 14 years later. The following 23 January, his side lost the league cup final 1–0 to Sporting; both he and opposing manager Ruben Amorim were sent off for arguing with each other. He also reached the decisive match in the other domestic cup, winning 3–2 at Porto in the semi-finals second leg in spite of playing more than one hour with one player less; the final was a 2–0 victory over Benfica on 23 May.

Carvalhal was linked to Flamengo in Brazil for the 2022 season, but would have faced a €10 million fine for not completing his Braga contract. Atlético Mineiro in the same country managed to reduce that fee down to €8 million due to only months remaining on his deal, but still considered it to be too high. He again finished fourth in the Portuguese League, reaching the quarter-finals in the Europa League; on 16 May, he asked the board of directors to allow him to leave and "embrace a new project", and his wish was granted.

=== Al Wahda ===
Carvalhal was linked to a return to the English second tier, and was interviewed by Blackburn Rovers. However, on 1 June 2022 he signed a one-year deal at Al Wahda in the UAE Pro League. He was dismissed on 3 October, having won and drawn once each from four games of the new season.

=== Celta ===
On 2 November 2022, Carvalhal was appointed at Celta after the sacking of Eduardo Coudet; he agreed to a contract until June 2024. In his first La Liga game three days later, he lost 2–1 at home to Osasuna. His team finished 13th, but only survived on the final day with a 2–1 win at Balaídos Stadium over champions Barcelona.

Carvalhal left the club on 10 June 2023. During his spell, and also after his departure, he stated in interviews that Iago Aspas had been the best player he had ever coached.

=== Olympiacos ===
On 5 December 2023, Carvalhal signed as coach of Olympiacos. He debuted nine days later in a 5–2 home win over FK TSC of Serbia in the Europa League group stage, ensuring passage to the UEFA Europa Conference League. In the January transfer window, sporting director Pedro Alves brought in six compatriots; the coach was removed from his position on 8 February 2024 after winning five and losing three of his eleven games, culminating in a 2–0 defeat to Panathinaikos in the Derby of the eternal enemies after the rivals had already eliminated them from the last 16 of the Greek Football Cup.

=== Third spell at Braga ===
Carvalhal returned to Braga on 12 August 2024, signing a two-year deal as replacement for Daniel Sousa who was dismissed one month after arriving. He finished fourth in his only season and, when he left in May 2025 by mutual agreement, he was the club manager with the most wins in history at 92 in 167 matches.

=== Famalicão ===
On 12 July 2026, Carvalhal was announced at Famalicão on a one-year contract; he replaced Hugo Oliveira, who left for Strasbourg after achieving a fifth place. On 19 October, however, after two consecutive losses, 4–1 in the domestic league against Alverca and 1–0 at lowly Paredes in the Portuguese Cup, he was dismissed.

== Personal life ==
Carvalhal attended university alongside fellow coach Rui Faria in Porto, and studied for his UEFA Pro Licence alongside José Mourinho. He also authored the book Soccer: Developing a Know-How (2014), in which he discussed his own coaching philosophy.

Carvalhal has a five-year university degree awarded by the School of Sport Sciences of the University of Porto; the curricula included subjects such as psychology and philosophy. He was known for giving metaphorical and allegorical answers to questions in press conferences.

In 1988, Carvalhal co-founded Braga-based sportswear company Lacatoni, the ca in the brand's name coming from his own name. In July 2020, he suffered light injuries in an attempted mugging when returning home to Braga after a match.

== Managerial statistics ==
As of match played 18 October 2026

Managerial record by team and tenure
Team	Nat	From	To	Record								Ref
Team	Nat	From	To	G	W	D	L	GF	GA	GD	Win %	Ref
Espinho	(Portugal)	20 May 1998	8 November 1999	47	17	13	17	58	55	+3	36.17	
Freamunde	(Portugal)	15 November 1999	30 May 2000	24	9	7	8	30	27	+3	37.50	
Vizela	(Portugal)	30 June 2000	4 December 2000	14	8	3	3	25	14	+11	57.14	
Aves	(Portugal)	4 December 2000	8 June 2001	22	2	8	12	17	46	−29	9.09	
Leixões	(Portugal)	8 June 2001	9 December 2002	64	42	13	9	118	56	+62	65.63	
Vitória Setúbal	(Portugal)	5 June 2003	19 May 2004	38	20	11	7	69	43	+26	52.63	
Belenenses	(Portugal)	19 May 2004	27 October 2005	46	18	8	20	55	48	+7	39.13	
Braga	(Portugal)	10 May 2006	8 November 2006	13	6	2	5	17	16	+1	46.15	
Beira-Mar	(Portugal)	10 November 2006	8 January 2007	6	1	2	3	10	10	+0	16.67	
Vitória Setúbal	(Portugal)	23 May 2007	15 May 2008	43	19	16	8	55	41	+14	44.19	
Asteras Tripolis	(Greece)	15 May 2008	11 November 2008	10	2	5	3	7	8	−1	20.00	
Marítimo	(Portugal)	24 February 2009	28 September 2009	18	2	8	8	20	25	−5	11.11	
Sporting CP	(Portugal)	16 November 2009	9 May 2010	33	16	7	10	53	37	+16	48.48	
Beşiktaş	(Turkey)	2 August 2011	2 April 2012	47	22	9	16	70	56	+14	46.81	
İstanbul Başakşehir	(Turkey)	16 May 2012	12 November 2012	12	3	2	7	11	16	−5	25.00	
Sheffield Wednesday	(England)	30 June 2015	24 December 2017	131	56	38	37	177	138	+39	42.75	
Swansea City	(Wales)	28 December 2017	18 May 2018	25	8	8	9	30	31	−1	32.00	
Rio Ave	(Portugal)	28 May 2019	25 July 2020	42	20	11	11	63	43	+20	47.62	
Braga	(Portugal)	28 July 2020	15 May 2022	104	58	20	26	179	110	+69	55.77	
Al Wahda	(United Arab Emirates)	1 June 2022	3 October 2022	4	1	1	2	7	5	+2	25.00	
Celta	(Spain)	2 November 2022	12 June 2023	29	10	8	11	40	33	+7	34.48	
Olympiacos	(Greece)	5 December 2023	7 February 2024	11	5	3	3	16	12	+4	45.45	
Braga	(Portugal)	12 August 2024	19 May 2025	50	28	10	12	77	52	+25	56.00	
Famalicão	(Portugal)	12 July 2026	19 October 2026	9	1	4	4	10	12	−2	11.11	
Total				842	374	217	251	1,214	934	+280	44.42	—

== Honours ==
=== Manager ===
Leixões

- Taça de Portugal runner-up: 2001–02
- Supertaça Cândido de Oliveira runner-up: 2002

Setúbal

- Taça da Liga: 2007–08

Braga

- Taça de Portugal: 2020–21
- Taça da Liga runner-up: 2020–21
- Supertaça Cândido de Oliveira runner-up: 2021

Individual

- Football League Cup Manager of the Tournament: 2015–16
- EFL Championship Manager of the Month: April 2017
