= Luís Gonçalves =

Luís Gonçalves may refer to:

- Luís Gonçalves (sprinter)
- Luís Gonçalves (football manager)
- Luis Bacca Gonçalves, Brazilian bobsledder

== See also ==
- Luís Gonçalves das Chagas, Baron of Candiota, Brazilian landowner, military leader and nobleman
