= Hugo Oliveira =

Hugo Oliveira may refer to:

- Hugo Oliveira (football manager) (born 1979), Portuguese football manager
- Hugo Oliveira (footballer) (born 2002), Portuguese footballer
