= João Pereira (footballer, born 1992) =

Portuguese football manager and former player (born 1992)

Personal information
- Full name: João Jorge Gândara Mendes Pereira
- Date of birth: 6 February 1992 (age 34)
- Place of birth: Coimbra, Portugal
- Position: Forward

Youth career
- 2003–2009: Académica
- 2009–2010: Vigor Mocidade

Senior career*
Years	Team	Apps	(Gls)
2011–2012	Mealhada	1	(0)

Managerial career
- 2010–2011: Mealhada (youth)
- 2012–2014: Mealhada (assistant)
- 2018: Académica (youth)
- 2018–2019: Palmeiras FC (youth)
- 2019–2021: Mozambique (assistant)
- 2022–2023: Amora
- 2023–2024: Alverca
- 2024–2025: Casa Pia
- * Club domestic league appearances and goals

João Jorge Gândara Mendes Pereira (born 6 February 1992) is a Portuguese professional football manager and former player who played as a forward. He most recently managed Primeira Liga club Casa Pia.

== Playing career ==
Born in Coimbra, Pereira represented local sides Académica de Coimbra and GR O Vigor da Mocidade as a youth. After spending one year as a coach of GD Mealhada's under-7 sides, he was assigned as a member of the first team squad ahead of the 2011–12 season, but only featured for six minutes.

In 2013–14, Pereira played for futsal side Atómicos Sport Clube.

== Managerial career ==
In 2012, Pereira became an assistant of Tó Miranda at Mealhada, before moving to Porto in 2014, as an assistant of the under-15 squad. He was also an assistant at Padroense's under-17 team before being named coach of Académica under-17s in January 2018.

Pereira also coached Palmeiras FC's under-17 team before becoming an assistant of compatriot Luís Gonçalves at the Mozambique national team in August 2019. He left the latter in March 2021, after Gonçalves was sacked.

On 26 June 2022, aged 30, Pereira was appointed manager of Liga 3 side Amora. On 14 June 2023, after missing out promotion in the second stage, he left the club after refusing a contract renewal.

On 24 June 2023, Pereira was announced as manager of Alverca also in the third division. He won the 2023–24 Liga 3 with the side, becoming the youngest manager to win a national title in Portugal at the age of 32, and taking the club back to a professional division after a 19-year absence. On 2 June 2024, however, he departed the side.

On 19 June 2024, Pereira moved straight to Primeira Liga after being named at the helm of Casa Pia. His first professional match occurred on 17 August, a 3–0 away loss to Benfica; he also became the second-youngest manager to debut in the top tier, only months behind André Villas-Boas (who was also 32 at the time of his debut in 2009).

Casa Pia set several historic records in the Primeira Liga: they achieved the highest number of wins in the competition, with 12 victories, and also established the club record for home wins, with 8 matches won. The team reached its highest points total in the Primeira Liga, accumulating 45 points, and scored the most goals in its history in the league, with 39 goals. Additionally, Casa Pia matched the club’s best-ever league finish by ending the season in 9th place.

On 3 November 2025, following a poor start to the 2025–26 campaign, with Casa Pia sitting on 16th place in the Primeira Liga table, Pereira was sacked.

== Managerial statistics ==
As of 1 November 2025

Managerial record by team and tenure
Team	Nat	From	To	Record								Ref
Team	Nat	From	To	G	W	D	L	GF	GA	GD	Win %	Ref
Amora	(Portugal)	26 June 2022	14 June 2023	30	17	3	10	51	39	+12	56.67	
Alverca	(Portugal)	24 June 2023	2 June 2024	34	19	8	7	62	28	+34	55.88	
Casa Pia	(Portugal)	19 June 2024	3 November 2025	48	17	11	20	62	69	−7	35.42	
Total				112	53	22	37	175	136	+39	47.32	—

== Honours ==
=== Manager ===
Alverca

- Liga 3: 2023–24
