= Gil Lameiras =

Portuguese football manager

Personal information
- Full name: Gil Moreira Lameiras
- Date of birth: 7 March 1994 (age 32)
- Place of birth: Fafe, Portugal
- Position: Midfielder

Team information
- Current team: Vitória Guimarães B (manager)

Youth career
- 2003–2004: Fafe
- 2004–2008: Ases São Jorge
- 2008–2012: Fafe

Senior career*
Years	Team	Apps	(Gls)
2012–2016	Travassós		
2016–2017	OFC Antime		
2017–2018	Fafe (futsal)	7	(3)

Managerial career
- 2017–2024: Vitória Guimarães (youth)
- 2024–2026: Vitória Guimarães B
- 2026: Vitória Guimarães
- 2026–: Vitória Guimarães B
- * Club domestic league appearances and goals

Gil Moreira Lameiras (born 7 March 1994) is a Portuguese football manager and former football and futsal player who played as a midfielder. He is the current manager of Vitória de Guimarães B.

== Playing career ==
Born in Fafe, Lameiras played for hometown sides A.D. Fafe and Desportivo Ases de São Jorge as a youth, before playing as a senior for G.D. Travassós in the regional leagues. In 2016, he moved to OFC Antime, before returning to his first club Fafe in the following year, but now for their futsal team.

== Managerial career ==
Lameiras began his coaching career in 2017, as an assistant of the under-9 squad of Vitória de Guimarães. He subsequently worked under the same capacity in the following years, before taking over the under-13 team in 2021.

On 10 July 2023, after being in charge of the under-15s the previous season, Lameiras was appointed manager of the under-17 squad. On 25 June of the following year, he was named at the helm of the reserves in the Campeonato de Portugal.

On 15 December 2025, after leading the B-side to a promotion to the Liga 3 and having the side in the second place of that category, Lameiras renewed his contract until 2028. The following 9 March, he replaced sacked Luís Pinto at the helm of the first team in the Primeira Liga.

On his professional debut on 14 March 2026, Lameiras' side lost 2–1 to Famalicão at home. On 24 June, he returned to the B-side after Tiago Margarido was appointed first team manager.

== Managerial statistics ==
As of 16 May 2026

Managerial record by team and tenure
Team	Nat	From	To	Record							
Team	Nat	From	To	G	W	D	L	GF	GA	GD	Win %
Vitória de Guimarães B	(Portugal)	25 June 2024	9 March 2026	56	31	14	11	88	53	+35	55.36
Vitória de Guimarães	(Portugal)	9 March 2026	24 June 2026	9	3	1	5	11	14	−3	33.33
Total				65	34	15	16	99	67	+32	52.31
