= Vasco Botelho da Costa =

Portuguese football manager (born 1989)

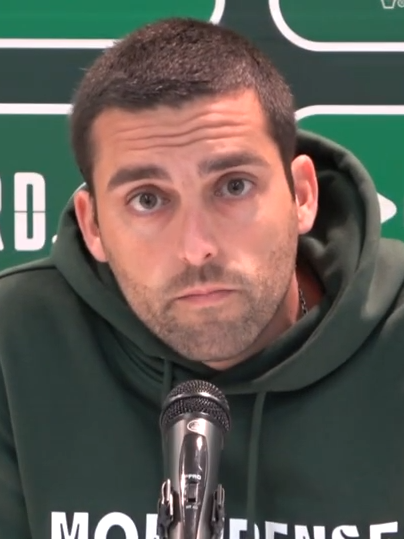
- Botelho da Costa in 2025

Personal information
- Full name: Vasco Maria de Albuquerque Botelho da Costa
- Date of birth: 2 March 1989 (age 37)
- Place of birth: Lisbon, Portugal

Team information
- Current team: Moreirense (manager)

Managerial career
- Years: Team
- 2008–2017: Cascais (youth)
- 2018–2020: Estoril (youth)
- 2020–2022: Estoril U23
- 2022–2024: União Leiria
- 2024–2025: Alverca
- 2025–: Moreirense

Vasco Maria de Albuquerque Botelho da Costa (born 2 March 1989) is a Portuguese football manager, who is currently the head coach of Primeira Liga club Moreirense.

After winning two league and cup titles each with Estoril's under-23 side, he was hired at União Leiria in 2022 and won Liga 3 in his first season, ending the club's 11 years outside the professional leagues. He won promotion to the Primeira Liga with Alverca in his only season in 2024–25, then joined Moreirense in the top flight.

== Career ==
=== Early career ===
Born in Lisbon, Botelho da Costa was raised in Alcabideche in neighbouring Cascais. He coached at local G.D.S. Cascais before moving to local G.D. Estoril Praia as under-17 manager, then under-19 in 2019.

In 2020, Botelho da Costa was appointed in charge of Estoril's under-23 team. He won the national league and cup in the age bracket twice each.

=== União Leiria ===
On 28 June 2022, 33-year-old Botelho da Costa was given his first head coach job in senior football, at U.D. Leiria in Liga 3, having not reached an agreement with S.C. Braga B. He led the club to promotion back to the professional leagues after 11 years away, securing their place on 29 April with a 1–0 home win over Braga B themselves; on 20 May his side won by the same score against C.F. Os Belenenses to take the league title.

In 2023–24, Botelho da Costa led Leiria to the quarter-finals of the Taça de Portugal for the first time in 21 years, before a 3–0 home loss to Sporting CP on 7 February. On 20 March he left by mutual consent, with the club in 12th place after 26 games in Liga Portugal 2.

=== Alverca ===
On 3 September 2024, Botelho da Costa was hired at F.C. Alverca also in the second tier, succeeding Zé Pedro. On his debut 12 days later he won 2–1 away to C.S. Marítimo, keeping up his record of always winning on his debut, including in youth football; furthermore it was his club's first win in a professional league since 22 May 2005, 7,027 days earlier.

Botelho da Costa led Alverca to promotion from second place in the 2024–25 Liga Portugal 2, one point behind C.D. Tondela. He then rejected the offer of a new contract and left, being linked to Moreirense F.C. in the Primeira Liga.

=== Moreirense ===
On 5 June 2025, Botelho da Costa joined Moreirense on a two-year deal. He won 2–1 at home to his previous employers Alverca on his top-flight debut on 10 August, on the first day of the season; in the previous six opening games of his career, he had won five outright and the sixth on a penalty shootout in the Taça da Liga. He led the club to 7th place with 43 points, and set a target of 35 for his second campaign.
