= 2017–18 Premier League =

Football season in England

Premier League
- Season: 2017–18
- Dates: 11 August 2017 – 13 May 2018
- Champions: Manchester City; 3rd Premier League title 5th English title
- Relegated: Swansea City; Stoke City; West Bromwich Albion
- Champions League: Manchester City; Manchester United; Tottenham Hotspur; Liverpool
- Europa League: Chelsea; Arsenal; Burnley
- Matches: 380
- Goals: 1,018 (2.68 per match)
- Top goalscorer: Mohamed Salah (32 goals)
- Best goalkeeper: David de Gea (18 clean sheets)
- Biggest home win: Manchester City 5–0 Liverpool (9 September 2017); Manchester City 5–0 Crystal Palace (23 September 2017); Manchester City 7–2 Stoke City (14 October 2017); Arsenal 5–0 Huddersfield Town (29 November 2017); Liverpool 5–0 Swansea City (26 December 2017); Chelsea 5–0 Stoke City (30 December 2017); Liverpool 5–0 Watford (17 March 2018); Manchester City 5–0 Swansea City (22 April 2018); Crystal Palace 5–0 Leicester City (28 April 2018); Arsenal 5–0 Burnley (6 May 2018)
- Biggest away win: Watford 0–6 Manchester City (16 September 2017)
- Highest scoring: Manchester City 7–2 Stoke City (14 October 2017); Tottenham Hotspur 5–4 Leicester City (13 May 2018)
- Longest winning run: 18 matches Manchester City
- Longest unbeaten run: 22 matches Manchester City
- Longest winless run: 20 matches West Bromwich Albion
- Longest losing run: 8 matches West Bromwich Albion
- Highest attendance: 83,222; Tottenham Hotspur 1–0 Arsenal (10 February 2018)
- Lowest attendance: 10,242; Bournemouth 2–1 West Bromwich Albion (17 March 2018)
- Total attendance: 14,505,909
- Average attendance: 38,274

The 2017–18 Premier League was the 26th season of the Premier League, the top English professional league for association football clubs, since its establishment in 1992, and the 119th season of top-flight English football overall. The season started on 11 August 2017 and concluded on 13 May 2018. Fixtures for the 2017–18 season were announced on 14 June 2017. Chelsea were the defending champions, while Newcastle United, Brighton & Hove Albion and Huddersfield Town entered as the promoted teams from the 2016–17 EFL Championship.

Manchester City won their third Premier League title, and fifth English top-flight title overall, with five games to spare. The team broke numerous Premier League records over the course of the season, including: most points (100), most wins (32), most away wins (16), most goals (106), most consecutive league wins (18), highest goal difference (+79), fewest minutes behind in matches (153 minutes) and biggest winning points margin (19). All three promoted clubs avoided relegation for the first time since the 2011–12 campaign, and for only the third time in Premier League history.

An independent commission later found that Manchester City breached Premier League financial rules during this season, along with breaches dating back to 2009.

== Overview ==
=== Sleeve sponsorship ===
From this season on, club strips could feature sleeve sponsorship, whereby sponsors' logos would appear on the left sleeve of the strip in lieu of the Premier League patch.

=== Deception by simulation ===
From this season on, a three-man panel consisting of a former player, a former manager and a former match official would independently review video evidence on the Monday after games. Any player whom the three-man panel unanimously decided had caused an opponent to be sent off or had won a penalty as a result of deceiving the referee by simulation would be charged by the Football Association with "Successful Deception of a Match Official" which carried a penalty of suspension for two matches. Everton striker Oumar Niasse became the first Premier League player to be punished under the new rule.

=== Summary ===
Manchester City were confirmed as Premier League champions following Manchester United's 0–1 defeat at home to West Bromwich Albion in the 33rd round of the league. Manchester City had started the Premier League season with an away win over Brighton & Hove Albion in August. After a draw against Everton, Manchester City won eighteen games in a row. During this time they secured first position and held it for the remainder of the season. On 7 April, Manchester City hosted Manchester United in the local derby, in which a win would have secured their position as champions. United came back from 2–0 down at half-time to win 3–2 and deny their rivals the title; however, the following week they lost to bottom club West Bromwich Albion, a result which, coupled with Manchester City's victory over Tottenham Hotspur, ensured an unassailable lead with five games left.

During the campaign Manchester City broke and set several new club and English football records. They established national records in consecutive away (11) and overall (20) victories in all competitions; set a new English record for consecutive league wins (18); equalled the Premier League record for consecutive away league wins (11) and set club records by achieving 28 consecutive games unbeaten in all competitions; 30 consecutive games unbeaten in the league; 20 consecutive home wins in all competitions; and winning 14 away games in a season. They won their fifth English league title, and completed their second league and League Cup double in four years.

Defending champions Chelsea started the season badly, losing their opening game to Burnley 2–3; the first time the holders were defeated at home in their first match. A win at one of the title favourites, Tottenham, in their second game seemed to get their defence back on track, but results in September, including losing 0–1 to Manchester City, left them six points behind the leaders in fourth place. They failed to show the consistency of the previous season, and finished in fifth place, leading to Antonio Conte's dismissal as manager a year after leading them to the title.

Manchester United started the season strongly winning their first three games without conceding a goal and led the table until mid-September. They finished in 2nd, their highest finish and points total (81) since the departure of Sir Alex Ferguson.

Liverpool finished fourth for a second consecutive season, buoyed by the signing of Mohamed Salah; his 32 goals broke a Premier League record for most goals scored in a 38-game season, beating the 31 achieved by Cristiano Ronaldo, Alan Shearer and Luis Suarez.

Arsenal had a poor season, finishing sixth overall. Long-serving manager Arsène Wenger announced his departure from the club on 20 April 2018. Their final home game was an emphatic 5–0 defeat of Burnley which guaranteed qualification to the group stage of the Europa League.

Despite the defeat, Burnley finished in seventh place, their best finish in English football since 1973–74. This meant they would be entered into the second qualifying round of the Europa League, their first competitive European football campaign in 50 years. Their strong finish led to manager Sean Dyche and defender James Tarkowski being nominated for the Premier League Manager of the Season and Premier League Player of the Season awards respectively.

Stoke City were the first team to be relegated to the EFL Championship when they lost 1–2 to Crystal Palace in their penultimate game. Although Stoke were only three points from safety with one game remaining, fellow strugglers Swansea and Southampton still had to play each other, meaning that Stoke would be unable to catch both of those teams and finish fourth from bottom. The game between Swansea and Southampton ended in a 1–0 away win for Southampton, which also meant that despite a five-game unbeaten run, West Bromwich Albion became the second team to be relegated to the Championship on 8 May 2018. Following their 1–2 defeat at the hands of Stoke on the final matchday, Swansea City were also relegated. This meant that for the first time since the 2011–12 campaign all three promoted teams, Newcastle United, Brighton & Hove Albion and Huddersfield Town, survived relegation.

== Teams ==
Twenty teams competed in the league – the top seventeen teams from the previous season and the three teams promoted from the Championship. The promoted teams were Newcastle United, Brighton & Hove Albion and Huddersfield Town, returning to the top flight after an absence of one, thirty-four and forty-five years respectively. This was also both Brighton & Hove Albion and Huddersfield Town's first season in the Premier League. They replaced Hull City, Middlesbrough (both teams relegated to the Championship after a season's presence) and Sunderland (relegated after ten years in the top flight).

=== Stadiums and locations ===
Locations of the 2017–18 Premier League teams
Greater London Premier League football clubs

Note: Table lists in alphabetical order. Source:

Team	Location	Stadium	Capacity
Arsenal	London (Holloway)	Emirates Stadium	60,407
Bournemouth	Bournemouth	Vitality Stadium	11,360
Brighton & Hove Albion	Falmer	Falmer Stadium	30,666
Burnley	Burnley	Turf Moor	21,944
Chelsea	London (Fulham)	Stamford Bridge	41,631
Crystal Palace	London (Selhurst)	Selhurst Park	25,456
Everton	Liverpool (Walton)	Goodison Park	39,944
Huddersfield Town	Huddersfield	Kirklees Stadium	24,169
Leicester City	Leicester	King Power Stadium	32,273
Liverpool	Liverpool (Anfield)	Anfield	53,394
Manchester City	Manchester (Bradford)	City of Manchester Stadium	55,017
Manchester United	Greater Manchester (Old Trafford)	Old Trafford	76,000
Newcastle United	Newcastle upon Tyne	St James' Park	52,354
Southampton	Southampton	St Mary's Stadium	32,384
Stoke City	Stoke-on-Trent	Bet365 Stadium	30,089
Swansea City	Swansea	Liberty Stadium	21,088
Tottenham Hotspur	London (Wembley)	Wembley Stadium (Note: Tottenham Hotspur played their home games at Wembley due to the rebuilding of their own stadium at White Hart Lane.)	90,000
Watford	Watford	Vicarage Road	21,577
West Bromwich Albion	West Bromwich	The Hawthorns	26,688
West Ham United	London (Stratford)	London Stadium	60,000

=== Personnel and kits ===
Team	Manager	Captain	Kit manufacturer	Shirt sponsor (chest)	Shirt sponsor (left sleeve)
Arsenal	(France) Arsène Wenger	(Germany) Per Mertesacker	Puma	Emirates	n/a
Bournemouth	(England) Eddie Howe	(England) Simon Francis	Umbro	M88	Mansion Group
Brighton & Hove Albion	(Republic of Ireland) Chris Hughton	(Spain) Bruno	Nike	American Express	JD
Burnley	(England) Sean Dyche	(England) Tom Heaton	Puma	Dafabet	Golf Clash
Chelsea	(Italy) Antonio Conte	(England) Gary Cahill	Nike	Yokohama Tyres	Alliance Tyres
Crystal Palace	(England) Roy Hodgson	(England) Jason Puncheon	Macron	ManBetX	Dongqiudi
Everton	(England) Sam Allardyce	(England) Phil Jagielka	Umbro	SportPesa	Angry Birds
Huddersfield Town	(United States) David Wagner	(England) Tommy Smith	Puma	OPE Sports	PURE Legal
Leicester City	(France) Claude Puel	(Jamaica) Wes Morgan	Puma	King Power	Siam Commercial Bank
Liverpool	(Germany) Jürgen Klopp	(England) Jordan Henderson	New Balance	Standard Chartered	Western Union
Manchester City	(Spain) Pep Guardiola	(Belgium) Vincent Kompany	Nike	Etihad Airways	Nexen Tire
Manchester United	(Portugal) José Mourinho	(England) Michael Carrick	Adidas	Chevrolet	n/a
Newcastle United	(Spain) Rafael Benítez	(England) Jamaal Lascelles	Puma	Fun88	MRF Tyres
Southampton	(Wales) Mark Hughes	(Northern Ireland) Steven Davis	Under Armour	Virgin Media	Virgin Media
Stoke City	(Scotland) Paul Lambert	(England) Ryan Shawcross	Macron	bet365	Top Eleven
Swansea City	(Portugal) Carlos Carvalhal	(Spain) Àngel Rangel	Joma	Letou	Barracuda Networks
Tottenham Hotspur	(Argentina) Mauricio Pochettino	(France) Hugo Lloris	Nike	AIA	n/a
Watford	(Spain) Javi Gracia	(England) Troy Deeney	Adidas	FxPro	138.com
West Bromwich Albion	(Jamaica) Darren Moore (caretaker)	(Northern Ireland) Jonny Evans	Adidas	Palm	12BET
West Ham United	(Scotland) David Moyes	(England) Mark Noble	Umbro	Betway	MRF Tyres

- Additionally, referee kits were made by Nike, sponsored by EA Sports, and Nike had a new match ball, the Ordem V Premier League.

=== Managerial changes ===
Team	Outgoing manager	Manner of departure	Date of vacancy	Position in table	Incoming manager	Date of appointment
Watford	(Italy) Walter Mazzarri	Mutual consent	21 May 2017	Pre-season	(Portugal) Marco Silva	27 May 2017
Crystal Palace	(England) Sam Allardyce	Resigned	23 May 2017	Pre-season	(Netherlands) Frank de Boer	26 June 2017
Southampton	(France) Claude Puel	Sacked	14 June 2017	Pre-season	(Argentina) Mauricio Pellegrino	23 June 2017
Crystal Palace	(Netherlands) Frank de Boer	Sacked	11 September 2017	19th	(England) Roy Hodgson	12 September 2017
Leicester City	(England) Craig Shakespeare	Sacked	17 October 2017	18th	(France) Claude Puel	25 October 2017
Everton	(Netherlands) Ronald Koeman	Sacked	23 October 2017	18th	(England) Sam Allardyce	30 November 2017
West Ham United	(Croatia) Slaven Bilić	Sacked	6 November 2017	18th	(Scotland) David Moyes	7 November 2017
West Bromwich Albion	(Wales) Tony Pulis	Sacked	20 November 2017	17th	(England) Alan Pardew	29 November 2017
Swansea City	(England) Paul Clement	Sacked	20 December 2017	20th	(Portugal) Carlos Carvalhal	28 December 2017
Stoke City	(Wales) Mark Hughes	Sacked	6 January 2018	18th	(Scotland) Paul Lambert	15 January 2018
Watford	(Portugal) Marco Silva	Sacked	21 January 2018	10th	(Spain) Javi Gracia	21 January 2018
Southampton	(Argentina) Mauricio Pellegrino	Sacked	12 March 2018	17th	(Wales) Mark Hughes	14 March 2018
West Bromwich Albion	(England) Alan Pardew	Mutual consent	2 April 2018	20th	(Jamaica) Darren Moore (caretaker)	2 April 2018

== League table ==
Pos	Team	Pld	W	D	L	GF	GA	GD	Pts	Qualification or relegation
1	Manchester City (C)	38	32	4	2	106	27	+79	100	Qualification for the Champions League group stage
2	Manchester United	38	25	6	7	68	28	+40	81	Qualification for the Champions League group stage
3	Tottenham Hotspur	38	23	8	7	74	36	+38	77	Qualification for the Champions League group stage
4	Liverpool	38	21	12	5	84	38	+46	75	Qualification for the Champions League group stage
5	Chelsea	38	21	7	10	62	38	+24	70	Qualification for the Europa League group stage (Note: Since the winners of the 2017–18 FA Cup (Chelsea) and the winners of the 2017–18 EFL Cup (Manchester City) both qualified for European competition based on their league positions, the berths awarded to the 5th-placed team (Europa League group stage) and the League Cup winners (Europa League second qualifying round) were passed down the league.)
6	Arsenal	38	19	6	13	74	51	+23	63	Qualification for the Europa League group stage
7	Burnley	38	14	12	12	36	39	−3	54	Qualification for the Europa League second qualifying round
8	Everton	38	13	10	15	44	58	−14	49	
9	Leicester City	38	12	11	15	56	60	−4	47	
10	Newcastle United	38	12	8	18	39	47	−8	44	
11	Crystal Palace	38	11	11	16	45	55	−10	44	
12	Bournemouth	38	11	11	16	45	61	−16	44	
13	West Ham United	38	10	12	16	48	68	−20	42	
14	Watford	38	11	8	19	44	64	−20	41	
15	Brighton & Hove Albion	38	9	13	16	34	54	−20	40	
16	Huddersfield Town	38	9	10	19	28	58	−30	37	
17	Southampton	38	7	15	16	37	56	−19	36	
18	Swansea City (R)	38	8	9	21	28	56	−28	33	Relegation to EFL Championship
19	Stoke City (R)	38	7	12	19	35	68	−33	33	Relegation to EFL Championship
20	West Bromwich Albion (R)	38	6	13	19	31	56	−25	31	Relegation to EFL Championship

Source: Premier League
Rules for classification: 1) Points; 2) Goal difference; 3) Goals scored. 4) Play-offs (only if needed to decide champion, teams for relegation or teams for UEFA competitions).
(C) Champions; (R) Relegated

== Results ==
Home \ Away	ARS	BOU	BHA	BUR	CHE	CRY	EVE	HUD	LEI	LIV	MCI	MUN	NEW	SOU	STK	SWA	TOT	WAT	WBA	WHU
Arsenal	—	3–0	2–0	5–0	2–2	4–1	5–1	5–0	4–3	3–3	0–3	1–3	1–0	3–2	3–0	2–1	2–0	3–0	2–0	4–1
Bournemouth	2–1	—	2–1	1–2	0–1	2–2	2–1	4–0	0–0	0–4	1–2	0–2	2–2	1–1	2–1	1–0	1–4	0–2	2–1	3–3
Brighton & Hove Albion	2–1	2–2	—	0–0	0–4	0–0	1–1	1–1	0–2	1–5	0–2	1–0	1–0	1–1	2–2	4–1	1–1	1–0	3–1	3–1
Burnley	0–1	1–2	0–0	—	1–2	1–0	2–1	0–0	2–1	1–2	1–1	0–1	1–0	1–1	1–0	2–0	0–3	1–0	0–1	1–1
Chelsea	0–0	0–3	2–0	2–3	—	2–1	2–0	1–1	0–0	1–0	0–1	1–0	3–1	1–0	5–0	1–0	1–3	4–2	3–0	1–1
Crystal Palace	2–3	2–2	3–2	1–0	2–1	—	2–2	0–3	5–0	1–2	0–0	2–3	1–1	0–1	2–1	0–2	0–1	2–1	2–0	2–2
Everton	2–5	2–1	2–0	0–1	0–0	3–1	—	2–0	2–1	0–0	1–3	0–2	1–0	1–1	1–0	3–1	0–3	3–2	1–1	4–0
Huddersfield Town	0–1	4–1	2–0	0–0	1–3	0–2	0–2	—	1–1	0–3	1–2	2–1	1–0	0–0	1–1	0–0	0–4	1–0	1–0	1–4
Leicester City	3–1	1–1	2–0	1–0	1–2	0–3	2–0	3–0	—	2–3	0–2	2–2	1–2	0–0	1–1	1–1	2–1	2–0	1–1	0–2
Liverpool	4–0	3–0	4–0	1–1	1–1	1–0	1–1	3–0	2–1	—	4–3	0–0	2–0	3–0	0–0	5–0	2–2	5–0	0–0	4–1
Manchester City	3–1	4–0	3–1	3–0	1–0	5–0	1–1	0–0	5–1	5–0	—	2–3	3–1	2–1	7–2	5–0	4–1	3–1	3–0	2–1
Manchester United	2–1	1–0	1–0	2–2	2–1	4–0	4–0	2–0	2–0	2–1	1–2	—	4–1	0–0	3–0	2–0	1–0	1–0	0–1	4–0
Newcastle United	2–1	0–1	0–0	1–1	3–0	1–0	0–1	1–0	2–3	1–1	0–1	1–0	—	3–0	2–1	1–1	0–2	0–3	0–1	3–0
Southampton	1–1	2–1	1–1	0–1	2–3	1–2	4–1	1–1	1–4	0–2	0–1	0–1	2–2	—	0–0	0–0	1–1	0–2	1–0	3–2
Stoke City	1–0	1–2	1–1	1–1	0–4	1–2	1–2	2–0	2–2	0–3	0–2	2–2	0–1	2–1	—	2–1	1–2	0–0	3–1	0–3
Swansea City	3–1	0–0	0–1	1–0	0–1	1–1	1–1	2–0	1–2	1–0	0–4	0–4	0–1	0–1	1–2	—	0–2	1–2	1–0	4–1
Tottenham Hotspur	1–0	1–0	2–0	1–1	1–2	1–0	4–0	2–0	5–4	4–1	1–3	2–0	1–0	5–2	5–1	0–0	—	2–0	1–1	1–1
Watford	2–1	2–2	0–0	1–2	4–1	0–0	1–0	1–4	2–1	3–3	0–6	2–4	2–1	2–2	0–1	1–2	1–1	—	1–0	2–0
West Bromwich Albion	1–1	1–0	2–0	1–2	0–4	0–0	0–0	1–2	1–4	2–2	2–3	1–2	2–2	2–3	1–1	1–1	1–0	2–2	—	0–0
West Ham United	0–0	1–1	0–3	0–3	1–0	1–1	3–1	2–0	1–1	1–4	1–4	0–0	2–3	3–0	1–1	1–0	2–3	2–0	2–1	—

Source: Premier League
Legend: Blue = home team win; Yellow = draw; Red = away team win.

== Season statistics ==
=== Scoring ===
==== Top scorers ====
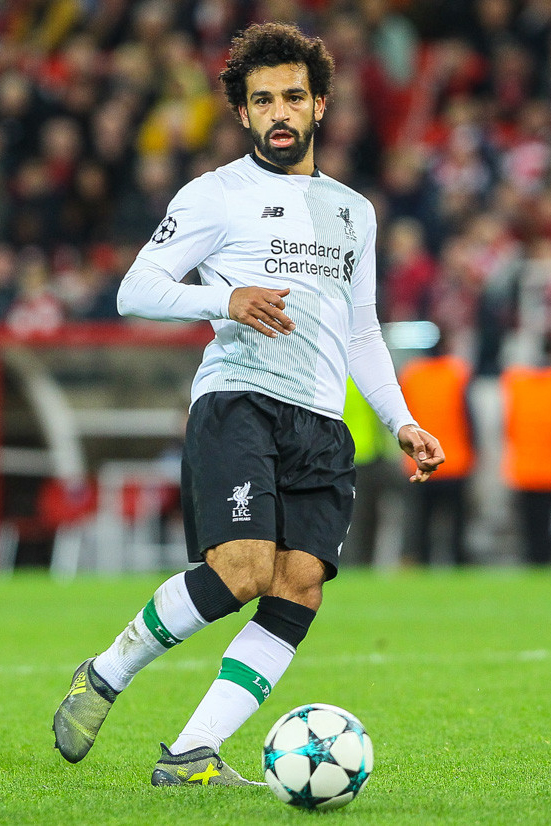
Liverpool's Mohamed Salah won the Premier League Golden Boot after scoring 32 goals, a record for a 38-game Premier League season.

Rank	Player	Club	Goals
1	(Egypt) Mohamed Salah	Liverpool	32
2	(England) Harry Kane	Tottenham Hotspur	30
3	(Argentina) Sergio Agüero	Manchester City	21
4	(England) Jamie Vardy	Leicester City	20
5	(England) Raheem Sterling	Manchester City	18
6	(Belgium) Romelu Lukaku	Manchester United	16
7	(Brazil) Roberto Firmino	Liverpool	15
8	(France) Alexandre Lacazette	Arsenal	14
9	(Brazil) Gabriel Jesus	Manchester City	13
10	(Belgium) Eden Hazard	Chelsea	12
10	(Algeria) Riyad Mahrez	Leicester City	12
10	(England) Glenn Murray	Brighton & Hove Albion	12
10	(South Korea) Son Heung-min	Tottenham Hotspur	12

==== Hat-tricks ====
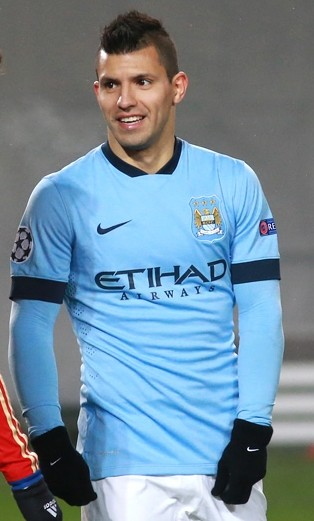
Sergio Agüero scored three hat-tricks this season, the most by a single player.

Player	For	Against	Result	Date	Ref
(Argentina) Sergio Agüero	Manchester City	Watford	6–0 (A)	16 September 2017	
(Spain) Álvaro Morata	Chelsea	Stoke City	4–0 (A)	23 September 2017	
(England) Callum Wilson	Bournemouth	Huddersfield Town	4–0 (H)	18 November 2017	
(England) Wayne Rooney	Everton	West Ham United	4–0 (H)	29 November 2017	
(England) Harry Kane	Tottenham Hotspur	Burnley	3–0 (A)	23 December 2017	
(England) Harry Kane	Tottenham Hotspur	Southampton	5–2 (H)	26 December 2017	
(Argentina) Sergio Agüero	Manchester City	Newcastle United	3–1 (H)	20 January 2018	
(Wales) Aaron Ramsey	Arsenal	Everton	5–1 (H)	3 February 2018	
(Argentina) Sergio Agüero^{4}	Manchester City	Leicester City	5–1 (H)	10 February 2018	
(Egypt) Mohamed Salah^{4}	Liverpool	Watford	5–0 (H)	17 March 2018	

Notes

^{4} Player scored 4 goals
(H) – Home team
(A) – Away team

=== Clean sheets ===
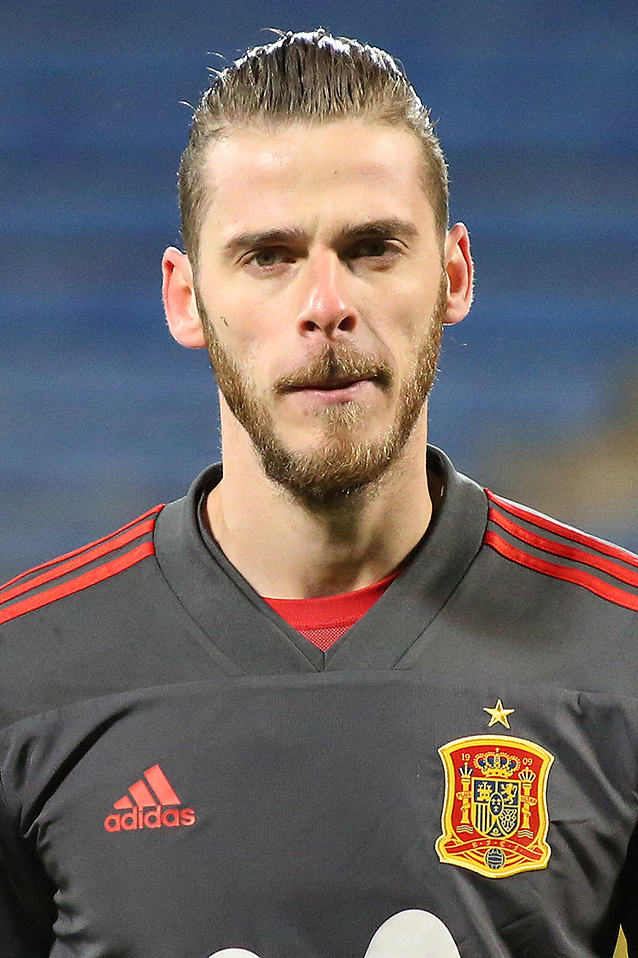
David de Gea won the Premier League Golden Glove after keeping 18 clean sheets for Manchester United.

Rank	Player	Club	Clean sheets
1	(Spain) David de Gea	Manchester United	18
2	(Brazil) Ederson	Manchester City	16
3	(Belgium) Thibaut Courtois	Chelsea	15
3	(France) Hugo Lloris	Tottenham Hotspur	15
5	(Czech Republic) Petr Čech	Arsenal	11
5	(England) Nick Pope	Burnley	11
7	(England) Ben Foster	West Bromwich Albion	10
7	(Germany) Loris Karius	Liverpool	10
7	(Denmark) Jonas Lössl	Huddersfield Town	10
7	(England) Jordan Pickford	Everton	10
7	(Australia) Mathew Ryan	Brighton & Hove Albion	10

=== Discipline ===
==== Player ====
- Most yellow cards: 11
  - (Spain) Oriol Romeu (Southampton)
- Most red cards: 2
  - (Nigeria) Wilfred Ndidi (Leicester City)
  - (England) Jonjo Shelvey (Newcastle United)

==== Club ====
- Most yellow cards: 73
  - West Bromwich Albion
  - West Ham United
- Most red cards: 5
  - Leicester City

== Awards ==
=== Monthly awards ===
Month	Manager of the Month		Player of the Month		Goal of the Month		References
Month	Manager	Club	Player	Club	Player	Club	References
August	(United States) David Wagner	Huddersfield Town	(Senegal) Sadio Mané	Liverpool	(England) Charlie Daniels	Bournemouth	
September	(Spain) Pep Guardiola	Manchester City	(England) Harry Kane	Tottenham Hotspur	(Ecuador) Antonio Valencia	Manchester United	
October	(Spain) Pep Guardiola	Manchester City	(Germany) Leroy Sané	Manchester City	(Morocco) Sofiane Boufal	Southampton	
November	(Spain) Pep Guardiola	Manchester City	(Egypt) Mohamed Salah	Liverpool	(England) Wayne Rooney	Everton	
December	(Spain) Pep Guardiola	Manchester City	(England) Harry Kane	Tottenham Hotspur	(England) Jermain Defoe	Bournemouth	
January	(England) Eddie Howe	Bournemouth	(Argentina) Sergio Agüero	Manchester City	(Brazil) Willian	Chelsea	
February	(Republic of Ireland) Chris Hughton	Brighton & Hove Albion	(Egypt) Mohamed Salah	Liverpool	(Kenya) Victor Wanyama	Tottenham Hotspur	
March	(England) Sean Dyche	Burnley	(Egypt) Mohamed Salah	Liverpool	(England) Jamie Vardy	Leicester City	
April	(Jamaica) Darren Moore	West Bromwich Albion	(Ivory Coast) Wilfried Zaha	Crystal Palace	(Denmark) Christian Eriksen	Tottenham Hotspur	

=== Annual awards ===
Award	Winner	Club
Premier League Manager of the Season	(Spain) Pep Guardiola	Manchester City
Premier League Player of the Season	(Egypt) Mohamed Salah	Liverpool
Premier League Goal of the Season	(Morocco) Sofiane Boufal	Southampton
PFA Players' Player of the Year	(Egypt) Mohamed Salah	Liverpool
PFA Young Player of the Year	(Germany) Leroy Sané	Manchester City
FWA Footballer of the Year	(Egypt) Mohamed Salah	Liverpool
PFA Fans' Player of the Year	(Egypt) Mohamed Salah	Liverpool

PFA Team of the Year
Goalkeeper	(Spain) David de Gea (Manchester United)			
Defence	(England) Kyle Walker (Manchester City)	(Argentina) Nicolás Otamendi (Manchester City)	(Belgium) Jan Vertonghen (Tottenham Hotspur)	(Spain) Marcos Alonso (Chelsea)
Midfield	(Denmark) Christian Eriksen (Tottenham Hotspur)		(Belgium) Kevin De Bruyne (Manchester City)	(Spain) David Silva (Manchester City)
Attack	(Egypt) Mohamed Salah (Liverpool)		(England) Harry Kane (Tottenham Hotspur)	(Argentina) Sergio Agüero (Manchester City)

== Attendances ==
Pos	Team	Total	High	Low	Average	Change
1	Manchester United	1,424,538	75,118	74,726	74,976	−0.4%
2	Tottenham Hotspur	1,291,103	83,222	50,034	67,953	+114.8%
3	Arsenal	1,127,133	59,547	58,420	59,323	−1.1%
4	West Ham United	1,080,808	56,988	56,197	56,885	−0.2%
5	Manchester City	1,022,434	54,452	53,241	53,812	−0.4%
6	Liverpool	1,007,931	53,287	50,752	53,049	+0.1%
7	Newcastle United	987,844	52,311	50,174	51,992	+1.7%^{1}
8	Chelsea	784,353	41,616	38,910	41,282	−0.5%
9	Everton	737,143	39,221	37,580	38,797	−1.3%
10	Leicester City	600,083	32,202	30,203	31,583	−1.0%
11	Southampton	585,084	31,930	27,714	30,794	−0.5%
12	Brighton & Hove Albion	577,701	30,634	29,676	30,405	+8.6%^{1}
13	Stoke City	556,317	30,022	27,458	29,280	+6.7%
14	Crystal Palace	476,189	25,840	23,477	25,063	−0.4%
15	West Bromwich Albion	465,878	26,223	22,704	24,520	+2.7%
16	Huddersfield Town	456,757	24,426	23,548	24,040	+18.2%^{1}
17	Burnley	393,080	21,841	18,862	20,688	+0.6%
18	Swansea City	391,830	20,933	19,580	20,623	0.0%
19	Watford	384,388	20,552	20,002	20,231	−1.7%
20	Bournemouth	202,154	10,952	10,242	10,640	−4.8%
	League total	14,552,748	83,222	10,242	38,297	+6.9%

Source: World Football
Notes:
1: Team played last season in the Championship
