= 2024–25 Liga Portugal 2 =

34th season of second-tier football league in Portugal

Liga Portugal 2
- Season: 2024–25
- Dates: 10 August 2024 – 17 May 2025
- Champions: Tondela (2nd Title)
- Promoted: Tondela; Alverca
- Relegated: Mafra
- Matches: 306
- Top goalscorer: Anthony Carter (15 goals)
- All statistics correct as of 25 May 2024.

The 2024–25 Liga Portugal 2 (also known as Liga Portugal 2 Meu Super for sponsorship reasons) was the 35th season of Portuguese football's second-tier league and the fifth season under the current Liga Portugal 2 title. A total of 18 teams competed in this division, including reserve sides from top-flight Liga Portugal teams.

== Teams ==
A total of 18 teams contest the league. Portimonense, Vizela and Chaves were relegated to 2024–25 Liga Portugal 2 after finishing in 16th, 17th and 18th placed teams in 2023–24 Primeira Liga, after seven, three and two years in Primeira Liga, respectively.

Alverca and Felgueiras (both promoted after a nineteen years absence), replaced Belenenses and Länk Vilaverdense (both relegated after one year in the second tier).

=== Changes ===
Relegated from 2023–24 Primeira Liga

- Portimonense (via play-off)
- Vizela
- Chaves

Promoted from 2023–24 Liga 3

- Alverca
- Felgueiras

Promoted to 2024–25 Primeira Liga

- Santa Clara
- Nacional
- AVS (via play-off)

Relegated to 2024–25 Liga 3

- Belenenses
- Länk Vilaverdense

=== Stadiums and Locations ===
Location of teams in 2024–25 Liga Portugal 2 (Mainland)
Location of teams in 2024–25 Liga Portugal 2 (Madeira)

| Club | Location | Stadium | Capacity | Final league position in 2023-24 |
|---|---|---|---|---|
| Académico de Viseu | Viseu | Estádio Municipal do Fontelo | 6,785 | 11th |
| Alverca | Vila Franca de Xira | Complexo Desportivo FC Alverca | 2,500 | 1st (L3) |
| Benfica B | Seixal | Benfica Campus | 2,644 | 8th |
| Chaves | Chaves | Estádio Municipal Eng.º; Manuel Branco Teixeira | 8,400 | 18th (PL) |
| Feirense | Santa Maria da Feira | Estádio Marcolino de Castro | 5,401 | 16th |
| Felgueiras | Felgueiras | Estádio Dr. Machado de Matos | 7,540 | 2nd (L3) |
| Leixões | Matosinhos | Estádio do Mar | 6,000 | 14th |
| Mafra | Mafra | Estádio Municipal de Mafra | 1,249 | 9th |
| Marítimo | Funchal | Estádio do Marítimo | 10,565 | 4th |
| Oliveirense | Oliveira de Azeméis | Estádio Carlos Osório | 1,750 | 15th |
| Paços de Ferreira | Paços de Ferreira | Estádio Capital do Móvel | 9,076 | 5th |
| Penafiel | Penafiel | Estádio Municipal 25 de Abril | 5,230 | 13th |
| Portimonense | Portimão | Estádio Municipal de Portimão | 4,961 | 16th (PL) |
| Porto B | Vila Nova de Gaia | Estádio Luís Filipe Menezes | 3,800 | 10th |
| Tondela | Tondela | Estádio João Cardoso | 5,000 | 6th |
| Torreense | Torres Vedras | Estádio Manuel Marques | 2,431 | 7th |
| União de Leiria | Leiria | Estádio Dr. Magalhães Pessoa | 23,888 | 12th |
| Vizela | Vizela | Estádio do Futebol Clube de Vizela | 6,000 | 17th (PL) |

== Personnel and sponsors ==
| Team | Manager | Captain | Kit Manufacturer | Main Sponsor |
|---|---|---|---|---|
| Académico de Viseu | (Portugal) Sérgio Vieira | (Portugal) André Almeida | Joma | Palácio do Gelo |
| Alverca | (Portugal) Vasco Botelho da Costa | (Portugal) Ricardo Dias | Kappa | Century 21 Imo Team |
| Benfica B | (Portugal) Nélson Veríssimo | (Portugal) Filipe Cruz | Adidas | Emirates |
| Chaves | (Portugal) Marco Alves | (Portugal) Vasco Fernandes | Lacatoni | Forte de São; Francisco Hotel |
| Feirense | (Portugal) Vítor Martins | (Portugal) Filipe Almeida | Kelme | Esconline |
| Felgueiras | (Portugal) Agostinho Bento | (Portugal) Mike Moura | G Sport | Câmara Municipal de Felgueiras |
| Leixões | (Portugal) José Mota | (Serbia) Igor Stefanovic | Lacatoni | Matosinhos |
| Mafra | (Portugal) Paulo Alves | (Portugal) Gui Ferreira | Lacatoni | Placard |
| Marítimo | (Portugal) Ivo Vieira | (Portugal) Fábio China | Puma | Coral Cerveja |
| Oliveirense | (Portugal) António Torres Campos | (Brazil) Filipe Alves | Kelme | Onodera Group |
| Paços de Ferreira | (Portugal) Carlos Fangueiro | (Portugal) Antunes | Joma | Solverde |
| Penafiel | (Portugal) Hélder Cristóvão | (Portugal) João Miguel | Macron | EDIRCOP |
| Portimonense | (Portugal) Ricardo Pessoa | (Brazil) Paulo Vítor | Mizuno | Ceremony |
| Porto B | (Portugal) João Brandão | (Portugal) André Castro | New Balance | Betano |
| Tondela | (Portugal) Luís Pinto | (Portugal) Ricardo Alves | CDT | Cabriz |
| Torreense | (Portugal) Tiago Fernandes | (Colombia) Juan Balanta | Umbro | Rações Valouro |
| União de Leiria | (Portugal) Jorge Silas | (Portugal) Diogo Amado | CDT | Megabox Interiores |
| Vizela | (Portugal) Fábio Pereira | (Portugal) Jota Gonçalves | Kappa | Solverde |

== Season summary ==
=== League table ===
| Pos | Team | Pld | W | D | L | GF | GA | GD | Pts | Promotion or relegation |
|---|---|---|---|---|---|---|---|---|---|---|
| 1 | Tondela (C, P) | 34 | 17 | 13 | 4 | 58 | 35 | +23 | 64 | Promotion to Liga Portugal |
| 2 | Alverca (P) | 34 | 17 | 12 | 5 | 58 | 34 | +24 | 63 | Promotion to Liga Portugal |
| 3 | Vizela | 34 | 17 | 11 | 6 | 50 | 30 | +20 | 62 | Qualification to Promotion play-offs |
| 4 | Benfica B (Note: Ineligible for promotion) | 34 | 15 | 10 | 9 | 53 | 38 | +15 | 55 | |
| 5 | Torreense | 34 | 15 | 9 | 10 | 49 | 42 | +7 | 54 | |
| 6 | União de Leiria | 34 | 15 | 7 | 12 | 49 | 37 | +12 | 52 | |
| 7 | Chaves | 34 | 14 | 9 | 11 | 40 | 34 | +6 | 51 | |
| 8 | Feirense | 34 | 13 | 10 | 11 | 35 | 34 | +1 | 49 | |
| 9 | Felgueiras | 34 | 11 | 13 | 10 | 43 | 38 | +5 | 46 | |
| 10 | Académico de Viseu | 34 | 11 | 12 | 11 | 43 | 41 | +2 | 45 (Note: Head-to-head: Académico de Viseu 1–0 Penafiel; Penafiel 0–2 Académico de Viseu.) | |
| 11 | Penafiel | 34 | 12 | 9 | 13 | 45 | 47 | −2 | 45 | |
| 12 | Marítimo | 34 | 10 | 13 | 11 | 42 | 48 | −6 | 43 | |
| 13 | Leixões | 34 | 10 | 11 | 13 | 37 | 42 | −5 | 41 | |
| 14 | Porto B | 34 | 8 | 11 | 15 | 36 | 47 | −11 | 35 | |
| 15 | Portimonense | 34 | 9 | 7 | 18 | 38 | 54 | −16 | 34 | |
| 16 | Paços de Ferreira (O) | 34 | 9 | 6 | 19 | 34 | 50 | −16 | 33 | Qualification to Relegation play-offs |
| 17 | Oliveirense | 34 | 7 | 8 | 19 | 30 | 64 | −34 | 29 | Remained in Liga 2 because Boavista failed to register. |
| 18 | Mafra (R) | 34 | 6 | 9 | 19 | 29 | 54 | −25 | 27 | Relegation to Liga 3 |

Source: Liga Portugal 2
Rules for classification: 1) Points; 2) Head-to-head points; 3) Head-to-head goal difference; 4) Goal difference; 5) Matches won; 6) Goals scored; 7) Play-off.
(C) Champions; (O) Play-off winners; (P) Promoted; (R) Relegated

== Relegation play-offs ==
The relegation play-offs took place on 25 May and 1 June 2025 between Paços de Ferreira which finished 16th in the Liga 2 and Belenenses which finished 3rd in Liga 3.

All times are WEST (UTC+1).

| Team 1 | Agg. | Team 2 | 1st leg | 2nd leg |
|---|---|---|---|---|
| Paços de Ferreira | 3–2 | Belenenses | 1–2 | 2–0 |

25 May 2024
19:00

| Belenenses | 2–1 | Paços de Ferreira |
|---|---|---|
| Diogo Leitão 63'; Xavi Fernandes 73' | Report | João Pinto 75' |

Estádio do Restelo, Lisbon
Referee: André Narciso (Setúbal)
2 June 2024
19:00

| Paços de Ferreira | 2–0 (a.e.t.) | Belenenses |
|---|---|---|
| Antunes 57' (pen.); Vladislav Morozov 106' | Report |

Estádio Marcolino de Castro, Paços de Ferreira
Referee: Anzhony Rodrigues (Madeira)

== Results ==
| Home \ Away | ACV | ALV | BEN | CHA | FEI | FEL | LEX | MAF | MAR | OLI | PAC | PEN | POR | PTM | TON | TOR | UNI | VIZ |
|---|---|---|---|---|---|---|---|---|---|---|---|---|---|---|---|---|---|---|
| Académico de Viseu | | 2–2 | 1–1 | 2–1 | 2–1 | 0–0 | 2–0 | 3–1 | 0–2 | 2–1 | 0–1 | 1–0 | 2–0 | 2–1 | 1–1 | 1–2 | 0–1 | 0–0 |
| Alverca | 0–4 | | 0–0 | 3–1 | 1–0 | 1–1 | 1–1 | 2–0 | 5–0 | 4–0 | 1–0 | 2–2 | 2–0 | 2–1 | 1–1 | 2–2 | 2–1 | 4–2 |
| Benfica B | 1–0 | 2–1 | | 1–0 | 0–1 | 2–0 | 4–0 | 5–0 | 1–2 | 2–2 | 0–0 | 1–1 | 2–1 | 0–0 | 1–3 | 2–0 | 0–5 | 1–0 |
| Chaves | 3–0 | 0–2 | 1–2 | | 0–0 | 2–0 | 0–0 | 0–3 | 1–1 | 4–0 | 2–1 | 0–1 | 2–1 | 2–0 | 2–2 | 2–1 | 0–2 | 1–2 |
| Feirense | 2–2 | 0–1 | 2–3 | 0–1 | | 3–2 | 1–0 | 2–1 | 1–0 | 3–1 | 2–0 | 3–0 | 0–1 | 1–1 | 1–1 | 1–1 | 2–1 | 0–0 |
| Felgueiras | 1–1 | 0–1 | 3–3 | 1–2 | 0–0 | | 4–0 | 1–1 | 1–3 | 2–1 | 1–0 | 1–0 | 1–0 | 0–0 | 1–0 | 1–2 | 2–2 | 2–1 |
| Leixões | 1–1 | 1–1 | 2–1 | 0–0 | 2–0 | 2–2 | | 2–1 | 2–1 | 1–2 | 3–3 | 3–1 | 3–0 | 3–0 | 0–1 | 1–1 | 0–1 | 0–1 |
| Mafra | 0–2 | 1–1 | 2–0 | 0–0 | 0–0 | 1–0 | 1–2 | | 2–3 | 0–0 | 0–1 | 4–2 | 0–0 | 2–2 | 0–4 | 2–0 | 2–1 | 1–4 |
| Marítimo | 1–1 | 1–2 | 1–1 | 1–1 | 1–1 | 0–0 | 1–1 | 2–0 | | 1–2 | 2–1 | 1–2 | 1–0 | 2–0 | 2–2 | 0–3 | 1–2 | 1–2 |
| Oliveirense | 2–0 | 1–4 | 3–2 | 0–3 | 1–0 | 0–3 | 0–1 | 0–0 | 1–1 | | 0–2 | 2–2 | 1–1 | 0–2 | 1–3 | 0–0 | 1–2 | 0–1 |
| Paços de Ferreira | 4–3 | 1–3 | 0–3 | 2–0 | 1–2 | 1–2 | 0–0 | 2–1 | 1–2 | 0–1 | | 1–3 | 2–2 | 0–1 | 0–1 | 1–0 | 2–3 | 1–1 |
| Penafiel | 0–2 | 3–2 | 1–1 | 0–0 | 1–2 | 2–1 | 3–1 | 1–1 | 0–1 | 4–3 | 1–2 | | 1–1 | 3–0 | 2–2 | 0–1 | 1–0 | 1–1 |
| Porto B | 3–2 | 1–1 | 1–4 | 1–2 | 1–1 | 0–2 | 0–1 | 2–1 | 0–1 | 2–1 | 1–0 | 3–2 | | 1–2 | 2–2 | 1–1 | 1–1 | 0–1 |
| Portimonense | 1–1 | 1–0 | 0–2 | 1–2 | 1–2 | 3–2 | 2–1 | 2–0 | 5–1 | 2–3 | 2–0 | 0–2 | 0–3 | | 2–2 | 1–2 | 0–3 | 1–1 |
| Tondela | 4–1 | 1–2 | 2–1 | 2–1 | 2–1 | 1–1 | 2–1 | 1–0 | 0–0 | 2–0 | 2–1 | 2–0 | 2–2 | 2–0 | | 2–2 | 1–4 | 0–1 |
| Torreense | 1–0 | 1–0 | 1–1 | 1–2 | 0–1 | 1–1 | 3–2 | 1–0 | 2–2 | 3–0 | 3–0 | 0–1 | 2–4 | 3–2 | 0–2 | | 2–1 | 2–4 |
| União de Leiria | 1–1 | 1–1 | 1–3 | 1–1 | 1–0 | 1–3 | 1–0 | 3–1 | 1–1 | 5–0 | 0–1 | 1–0 | 0–0 | 1–0 | 0–2 | 1–3 | | 0–2 |
| Vizela | 1–1 | 1–1 | 1–0 | 0–1 | 5–0 | 1–1 | 0–0 | 3–0 | 3–2 | 0–0 | 2–1 | 1–2 | 2–1 | 3–2 | 1–1 | 1–2 | 1–0 | |

Updated to match(es) played on 17 May 2025. Source: Liga Portugal 2
Legend: Blue = home team win; Yellow = draw; Red = away team win.

=== Positions by round ===
The table lists the positions of teams after each week of matches. In order to preserve chronological evolvements, any postponed matches are not included to the round at which they were originally scheduled, but added to the full round they were played immediately afterwards.

| Team ╲ Round | 1 | 2 | 3 | 4 | 5 | 6 | 7 | 8 | 9 | 10 | 11 | 12 | 13 | 14 | 15 | 16 | 17 | 18 | 19 | 20 | 21 | 22 | 23 | 24 | 25 | 26 | 27 | 28 | 29 | 30 | 31 | 32 | 33 | 34 |
|---|---|---|---|---|---|---|---|---|---|---|---|---|---|---|---|---|---|---|---|---|---|---|---|---|---|---|---|---|---|---|---|---|---|---|
| Tondela | 8 | 10 | 9 | 11 | 8 | 3 | 3 | 3 | 1 | 1 | 2 | 1 | 1 | 1 | 2 | 2 | 2 | 3 | 3 | 1 | 1 | 1 | 1 | 1 | 1 | 1 | 1 | 1 | 1 | 1 | 1 | 1 | 1 | 1 |
| Alverca | 9 | 12 | 10 | 16 | 10 | 12 | 12 | 12 | 14 | 11 | 11 | 9 | 9 | 7 | 7 | 7 | 7 | 6 | 5 | 4 | 4 | 2 | 3 | 2 | 3 | 5 | 3 | 3 | 3 | 3 | 3 | 3 | 2 | 2 |
| Vizela | 1 | 8 | 12 | 14 | 9 | 5 | 6 | 8 | 9 | 9 | 9 | 12 | 12 | 14 | 12 | 13 | 12 | 10 | 9 | 8 | 7 | 8 | 7 | 6 | 5 | 3 | 2 | 2 | 2 | 2 | 2 | 2 | 3 | 3 |
| Benfica B | 14 | 7 | 3 | 3 | 3 | 2 | 2 | 1 | 2 | 3 | 3 | 3 | 3 | 4 | 3 | 3 | 3 | 2 | 2 | 3 | 3 | 4 | 5 | 4 | 6 | 6 | 7 | 4 | 5 | 5 | 4 | 4 | 6 | 4 |
| Torreense | 17 | 18 | 11 | 5 | 4 | 7 | 10 | 14 | 8 | 8 | 7 | 6 | 5 | 3 | 4 | 4 | 4 | 4 | 4 | 5 | 6 | 6 | 8 | 8 | 7 | 7 | 8 | 6 | 6 | 6 | 6 | 5 | 4 | 5 |
| União de Leiria | 18 | 6 | 7 | 8 | 6 | 6 | 9 | 13 | 15 | 12 | 13 | 10 | 10 | 10 | 9 | 9 | 8 | 8 | 8 | 9 | 9 | 10 | 9 | 9 | 8 | 8 | 5 | 8 | 7 | 8 | 7 | 7 | 5 | 6 |
| Chaves | 15 | 15 | 14 | 17 | 13 | 10 | 11 | 11 | 7 | 6 | 6 | 5 | 4 | 6 | 5 | 6 | 6 | 5 | 6 | 6 | 5 | 5 | 4 | 5 | 4 | 2 | 4 | 5 | 4 | 4 | 5 | 6 | 7 | 7 |
| Feirense | 5 | 4 | 6 | 9 | 5 | 9 | 7 | 9 | 10 | 13 | 12 | 13 | 11 | 11 | 10 | 10 | 9 | 9 | 10 | 10 | 10 | 7 | 6 | 7 | 9 | 9 | 9 | 10 | 9 | 7 | 8 | 8 | 8 | 8 |
| Felgueiras | 11 | 13 | 13 | 12 | 15 | 11 | 13 | 7 | 11 | 10 | 10 | 12 | 14 | 12 | 13 | 12 | 11 | 13 | 13 | 15 | 15 | 15 | 11 | 12 | 12 | 11 | 12 | 12 | 12 | 12 | 12 | 12 | 12 | 9 |
| Académico de Viseu | 3 | 2 | 1 | 1 | 2 | 4 | 5 | 6 | 6 | 5 | 4 | 4 | 6 | 5 | 6 | 5 | 5 | 7 | 7 | 7 | 8 | 9 | 10 | 10 | 10 | 10 | 10 | 9 | 10 | 10 | 11 | 9 | 9 | 10 |
| Penafiel | 2 | 1 | 2 | 2 | 1 | 1 | 1 | 2 | 3 | 2 | 1 | 2 | 2 | 2 | 1 | 1 | 1 | 1 | 1 | 2 | 2 | 3 | 2 | 3 | 2 | 4 | 6 | 7 | 8 | 9 | 9 | 10 | 10 | 11 |
| Marítimo | 7 | 3 | 5 | 10 | 14 | 13 | 8 | 5 | 5 | 4 | 8 | 8 | 8 | 9 | 11 | 11 | 14 | 15 | 15 | 14 | 14 | 14 | 15 | 13 | 13 | 14 | 11 | 11 | 11 | 11 | 10 | 11 | 11 | 12 |
| Leixões | 4 | 5 | 4 | 4 | 7 | 8 | 4 | 4 | 4 | 7 | 5 | 7 | 7 | 8 | 8 | 8 | 10 | 11 | 11 | 12 | 13 | 11 | 13 | 15 | 15 | 13 | 14 | 13 | 13 | 14 | 14 | 13 | 13 | 13 |
| Porto B | 10 | 11 | 16 | 15 | 16 | 17 | 18 | 15 | 16 | 16 | 17 | 15 | 15 | 17 | 17 | 17 | 17 | 17 | 17 | 16 | 16 | 16 | 16 | 16 | 16 | 16 | 16 | 16 | 16 | 16 | 15 | 15 | 14 | 14 |
| Portimonense | 12 | 17 | 17 | 7 | 11 | 14 | 16 | 18 | 17 | 17 | 15 | 17 | 13 | 16 | 15 | 14 | 13 | 12 | 12 | 11 | 11 | 12 | 14 | 11 | 11 | 12 | 13 | 14 | 14 | 13 | 13 | 14 | 15 | 15 |
| Paços de Ferreira | 6 | 9 | 8 | 13 | 17 | 18 | 14 | 10 | 12 | 14 | 14 | 14 | 16 | 13 | 14 | 15 | 15 | 14 | 14 | 13 | 12 | 13 | 12 | 14 | 14 | 15 | 15 | 15 | 15 | 15 | 16 | 16 | 16 | 16 |
| Oliveirense | 13 | 14 | 18 | 18 | 18 | 15 | 17 | 17 | 18 | 18 | 18 | 18 | 18 | 18 | 18 | 18 | 18 | 18 | 18 | 18 | 18 | 17 | 17 | 17 | 17 | 17 | 18 | 17 | 17 | 17 | 17 | 17 | 17 | 17 |
| Mafra | 16 | 16 | 15 | 6 | 12 | 16 | 15 | 16 | 13 | 15 | 16 | 16 | 17 | 15 | 16 | 16 | 16 | 16 | 16 | 17 | 17 | 18 | 18 | 18 | 18 | 18 | 17 | 18 | 18 | 18 | 18 | 18 | 18 | 18 |

| Leader and promotion to Primeira Liga |
| Promotion to Primeira Liga |
| Qualification for promotion play-offs |
| Qualification for relegation play-offs |
| Relegation to Liga 3 |

Updated to match(es) played on 17 May 2025. Source: Liga Portugal 2

== Number of teams by district ==
| Rank | District Football Associations | Number | Teams |
|---|---|---|---|
| 1 | Porto | 5 | Felgueiras, Leixões, Paços de Ferreira, Penafiel and Porto B |
| 2 | Lisbon | 4 | Alverca, Benfica B, Mafra and Torreense |
| 3 | Aveiro | 2 | Feirense and Oliveirense |
| 3 | Viseu | 2 | Académico de Viseu and Tondela |
| 5 | Braga | 1 | Vizela |
| 5 | Faro | 1 | Portimonense |
| 5 | Funchal | 1 | Marítimo |
| 5 | Leiria | 1 | União de Leiria |
| 5 | Vila Real | 1 | Chaves |

== Attendances ==
| # | Club | Average |
|---|---|---|
| 1 | Marítimo | 5,579 |
| 2 | Leiria | 3,172 |
| 3 | Tondela | 2,148 |
| 4 | Vizela | 2,056 |
| 5 | Feirense | 1,895 |
| 6 | Paços | 1,781 |
| 7 | Viseu | 1,624 |
| 8 | Leixões | 1,579 |
| 9 | Chaves | 1,459 |
| 10 | Felgueiras | 1,434 |
| 11 | Penafiel | 1,109 |
| 12 | Alverca | 1,005 |
| 13 | Portimonense | 961 |
| 14 | Torreense | 825 |
| 15 | Oliveirense | 592 |
| 16 | Porto B | 581 |
| 17 | Benfica B | 544 |
| 18 | Mafra | 464 |
