= Ibrahima Ba (footballer, born 2005) =

Senegalese footballer (born 2005)

Personal information
- Date of birth: 26 May 2005 (age 21)
- Place of birth: Boune, Senegal
- Height: 1.90 m (6 ft 3 in)
- Position: Centre-back

Team information
- Current team: Sporting CP
- Number: 55

Youth career
- AJEL de Rufisque

Senior career*
Years	Team	Apps	(Gls)
2021–2024	AJEL de Rufisque	0	(0)
2023–2024	→ Valenciennes II (loan)	10	(0)
2024	→ Valenciennes (loan)	1	(0)
2024–2026	Famalicão	23	(1)
2026–	Sporting CP	0	(0)
- * Club domestic league appearances and goals as of 25 May 2026

Ibrahima Ba (born 26 May 2005) is a Senegalese professional football player who plays as centre-back for Primeira Liga club Sporting CP.

== Career ==
A youth product of AJEL de Rufisque, Ba joined the French club Valenciennes on loan on 2 October 2023 with an option to sign for 3 seasons. He made his senior and professional debut with Valenciennes in a 2–0 Ligue 2 loss to AS Saint-Étienne on 30 March 2024.

On 3 July 2024, Ba transferred to the Primeira Liga club Famalicão on a five-year contract. On 21 March 2026, he scored his first goal in a 1–0 victory over Nacional. In mid-July 2026, Ba's proposed move to Strasbourg collapsed after his agent alleged the club had reduced his agreed salary by 33%, while other reports claiming that he had failed his medical.

On 22 July 2026, Ba signed a five-year contract with Sporting CP.

== Career statistics ==
As of match played 26 April 2026

Appearances and goals by club, season and competition
Club	Season	League			Cup		Europe		Total	
Club	Season	Division	Apps	Goals	Apps	Goals	Apps	Goals	Apps	Goals
AJEL de Rufisque	2021–22	—			—		—		0	0
Valenciennes II (loan)	2023–24	CFA	10	0	—		—		10	0
Valenciennes (loan)	2023–24	Ligue 2	1	0	0	0	—		1	0
Famalicão	2024–25	Primeira Liga	2	0	1	0	—		3	0
Famalicão	2025–26	Primeira Liga	21	1	3	0	—		24	1
Famalicão	Total		23	1	4	0	—		27	1
Career total			34	1	4	0	0	0	38	1
