= Cristiano Bacci =

Italian footballer and coach (born 1975)

Personal information
- Date of birth: 6 July 1975 (age 51)
- Place of birth: Viareggio, Italy
- Height: 1.91 m (6 ft 3 in)
- Position: Centre-back

Senior career*
Years	Team	Apps	(Gls)
1991–1992	Viareggio	3	(0)
1992–1993	Roma	0	(0)
1993–1994	Lucchese	0	(0)
1994–1995	Sangiovannese	15	(0)
1995–1998	Olbia	67	(1)
1998–1999	Pontedera	31	(2)
1999–2000	Sanremese	26	(2)
2000–2001	Montevarchi	17	(0)
2001–2002	Pro Vercelli	8	(0)
2002–2003	Valenzana	24	(4)
2003–2005	Legnano	30	(1)
2005–2007	Biellese	46	(1)
2007–2008	Virtus Entella	40	(4)
Total		307	(15)

Managerial career
- 2010–2011: Virtus Entella
- 2011–2012: Derthona
- 2013–2015: Folgore Caratese
- 2015–2016: Olhanense
- 2017–2019: PAOK (assistant)
- 2019–2021: Al-Hilal (assistant)
- 2021–2023: PAOK (assistant)
- 2023–2024: Udinese (assistant)
- 2024–2025: Boavista
- 2025: Moreirense
- 2025: Panserraikos
- 2025–2026: Tondela
- * Club domestic league appearances and goals

Cristiano Bacci (born 6 July 1975) is an Italian professional football manager and former player. He was most recently the manager of Primeira Liga club Tondela.

== Playing career ==
Bacci has played for Roma and for various Serie C2 and Serie D teams, such as Viareggio, Olbia, Sanremese, Pro Vercelli, Legnano, Biellese and Virtus Entella.

== Managerial career ==
After his retirement, Bacci became the manager of his last club Virtus Entella juniores and he won the Campionato Juniores Nazionali. He became the coach of the first team in the 2010–11 season in the Lega Pro Seconda Divisione Group A until the 30th game, being dismissed after the 2–0 defeat by Pro Patria and replaced by Luca Prina.

From 5 December 2011 until the end of the season, Bacci was the new coach of Derthona, then Folgore Caratese in the Serie D until the summer of 2015. In February 2016, he took over Portuguese club Olhanense, but was sacked on 1 November 2017.

Bacci was subsequently an assistant coach of Răzvan Lucescu at PAOK and Al Hilal, and was part of Gabriele Cioffi's staff at Udinese in the 2023–24 season. On 20 June 2024, he was appointed as the new manager of Boavista, in the Portuguese Primeira Liga.
