= Marco Silva =

Portuguese footballer and manager (born 1977)

- Silva in 2026

Personal information
- Full name: Marco Alexandre Saraiva da Silva
- Date of birth: 12 July 1977 (age 49)
- Place of birth: Lisbon, Portugal
- Height: 1.80 m (5 ft 11 in)
- Position: Right-back

Team information
- Current team: Benfica (head coach)

Youth career
- 1992–1995: Cova Piedade
- 1995–1996: Belenenses

Senior career*
Years	Team	Apps	(Gls)
1996–1997	Belenenses	1	(0)
1997–1998	Atlético	6	(0)
1998–2001	Trofense	65	(1)
1999–2000	→ Campomaiorense (loan)	1	(0)
2001	Rio Ave	9	(0)
2002–2003	Braga B	28	(1)
2003–2004	Salgueiros	22	(0)
2004–2005	Odivelas	34	(0)
2005–2011	Estoril	121	(2)
Total		287	(4)

Managerial career
- 2011–2014: Estoril
- 2014–2015: Sporting CP
- 2015–2016: Olympiacos
- 2017: Hull City
- 2017–2018: Watford
- 2018–2019: Everton
- 2021–2026: Fulham
- 2026–: Benfica
- * Club domestic league appearances and goals

Marco Alexandre Saraiva da Silva (European Portuguese: [ˈmaɾku ˈsilvɐ]; born 12 July 1977) is a Portuguese football manager and former player who played as a right-back. He is the head coach of Primeira Liga club Benfica.

He played for a variety of Portuguese clubs, finishing his career with a six-year spell at Estoril. He managed them for three years before spending a season as coach of Sporting CP, during which the team won the 2014–15 Taça de Portugal.

Silva then worked abroad, first with Olympiacos where he won the Super League Greece in 2015–16. He went on to spend several years in the English Premier League, as head coach of Hull City, Watford, Everton and Fulham.

== Playing career ==
Born in Lisbon, Silva developed into a professional footballer with local Belenenses. In a 15-year career he only appeared in two Primeira Liga games, one with that club and another with Campomaiorense. From 2000 to 2005 he alternated between the second and third divisions, representing Trofense, Rio Ave, Braga B, Salgueiros and Odivelas.

In the 2005 off-season, Silva joined Estoril, where he remained until his retirement six years later, always in the second tier. He played his last match on 2 January 2011, a 0–1 home loss against Penafiel in the group stage of the Taça da Liga.

Silva retired in June at the age of 34, amassing second-division totals of 152 games and two goals for three clubs.

== Coaching career ==
=== Estoril ===
On 10 June 2011, immediately after retiring, Silva was appointed director of football at Estoril. However, early into the season, he replaced Vinícius Eutrópio as manager, with the Cascais team ranking tenth in the second tier. His first game in charge was a 3–1 defeat at Penafiel and, after losing only three matches in 24, he helped the club return to the top flight after seven years, as champions. He ultimately was chosen as the league's Manager of the Year.

Silva made his debut in the Portuguese top division on 17 August 2012, in a 2–1 away defeat to Olhanense. Estoril overachieved for a second best-ever fifth place in the table, with the subsequent qualification for the UEFA Europa League, also a first. Highlights included not losing any of the games against Sporting CP (3–1 at home, 2–2 away), and drawing 1–1 at Benfica.

On 23 February 2014, Estoril achieved an historic first-time win at the Estádio do Dragão, the 1–0 victory – where he was sent off midway through the second half – being Porto's first home defeat since the 2–3 against Leixões in 2008. He left his position on 12 May, after leading his team to the fourth position.

=== Sporting CP ===
Silva agreed to a four-year contract with Sporting on 21 May 2014, replacing Leonardo Jardim who left for Monaco. He led the team to the third place in the championship, also winning the Taça de Portugal by beating Braga 3–1 on penalties after a 2–2 draw in the final– this was the club's first piece of silverware since the 2008 Supertaça Cândido de Oliveira.

On 4 June 2015, four days after winning the trophy, Sporting announced that Silva had been dismissed with just cause, for not wearing their official suit in a cup match against Vizela. The dismissal was necessary for president Bruno de Carvalho to bring in Jorge Jesus from rivals Benfica, and included a clause requiring Silva to pay Sporting should he join another Portuguese team.

=== Olympiacos ===
On 8 July 2015, Silva was appointed the successor of countryman Vítor Pereira at Olympiacos, signing on a two-year contract. His first competitive game occurred in the season opener in the Super League Greece, winning 3–0 against Panionios. On 16 September, he played his first UEFA Champions League match with his new club, losing at home to Bayern Munich in the group stage by the same score.

Silva subsequently guided the team to break the record of eleven consecutive league wins from the first matchday, also recording a 3–2 victory at Arsenal in the Champions League group phase. The Piraeus side's run of domestic wins ended at 17, a European record in the 21st century, but they nonetheless won a record 43rd title with six games remaining.

Silva left Olympiacos on 23 June 2016, citing personal reasons.

=== Hull City ===
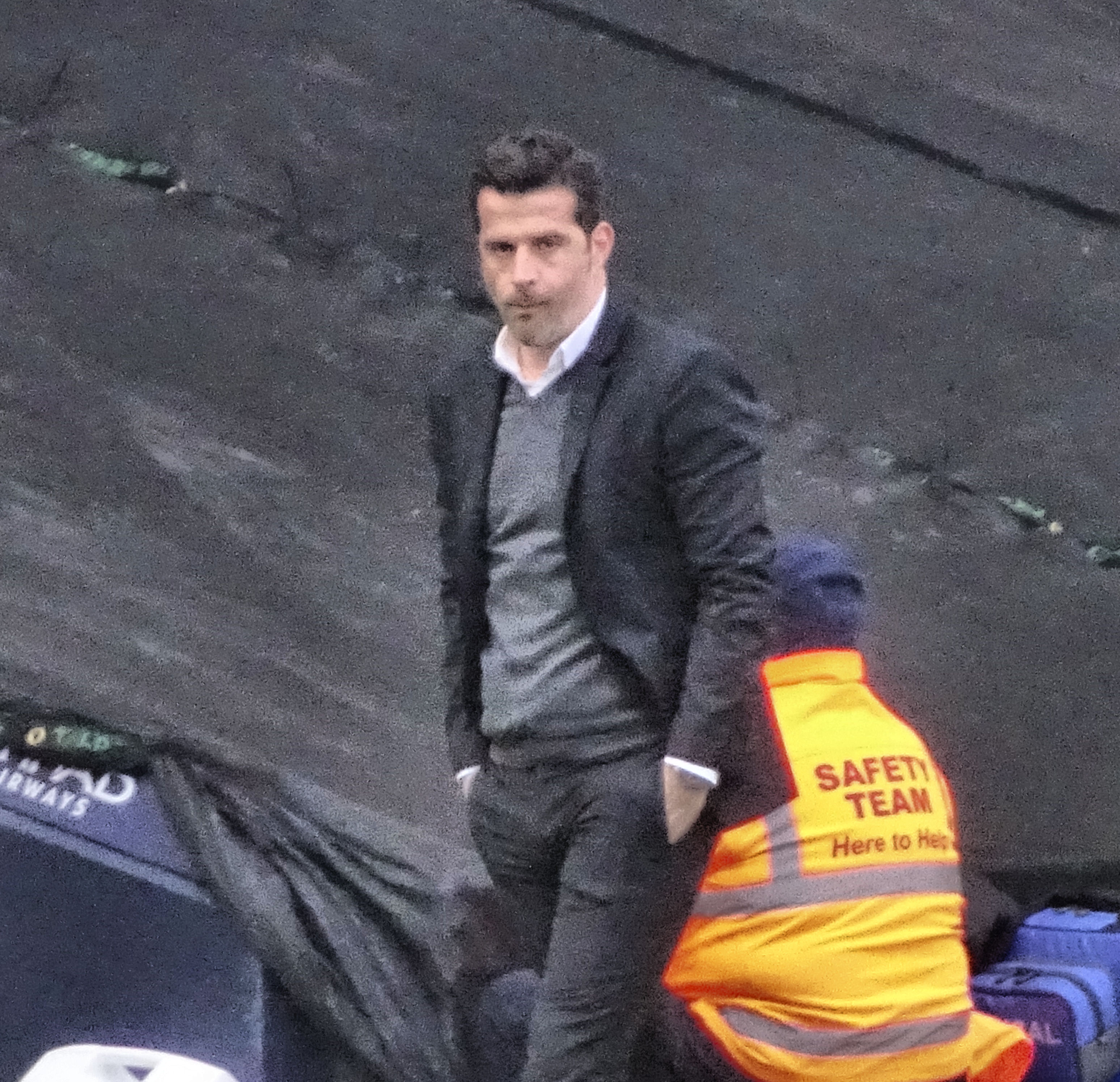
Silva managing Hull City in 2017

On 5 January 2017, Silva was appointed as the head coach of Hull City until the end of the season, replacing Mike Phelan who was dismissed with the team bottom of the Premier League; upon his appointment, vice-chairman Ehab Allam said: "He has a great track record and we feel this is a bold and exciting appointment in our aim to retain the club's Premier League status". Silva brought in his own coaching team, including assistant João Pedro Sousa, first-team coach Gonçalo Pedro and goalkeeping coach Hugo Oliveira.

Two days after his appointment, Silva led the side to a 2–0 win over Swansea City in the third round in the FA Cup. His first league match in charge also ended in success, with a 3–1 defeat of Bournemouth on 14 January.

On 26 January 2017, Silva's Hull beat Manchester United 2–1 in the semi-finals of the EFL Cup, giving the club its first victory over that opponent since 1974. However, due to the latter's 2–0 win in the first-leg of the tie, the former failed to advance to the final, but on 4 February they beat Liverpool 2–0 in the domestic league, giving the coach four wins from his first four home matches as manager.

In March 2017, Silva stated that he wanted to end the groundshare agreement with rugby league's Hull F.C. at the KCOM Stadium, as the latter played on Friday and affected the pitch quality for his team at the weekend. On 25 May, after relegation, he resigned.

=== Watford ===
On 27 May 2017, it was confirmed Silva would join Premier League club Watford as head coach on a two-year contract. After a good start to the season, he was tracked for the vacant managerial position at Everton in November. During this period and in the subsequent two months, the team's performances became increasingly poor (five points from 30 in ten Premier League matches), with fans citing his loss of focus as putting them at risk of relegation.

Silva was dismissed by Watford on 21 January 2018, with the club citing the "unwarranted approach by a Premier League rival" that caused "significant deterioration in both focus and results to the point where the long-term future of Watford FC has been jeopardised". In February, Everton agreed to pay £4 million in compensation in response to this claim.

=== Everton ===
Silva was confirmed as manager of Everton on 31 May 2018, on a three-year contract. His first game in charge was a 22–0 win in a pre-season friendly over Austrian amateurs ATV Irdning. On 21 April 2019, he guided the side to a 4–0 victory over Manchester United, the Toffees' largest victory over them in all competitions since a 5–0 win in October 1984. His first season at Goodison Park ended with an eighth place after a 2–2 draw away at Tottenham Hotspur on the final matchday. Although the side finished in the same position that they achieved under Sam Allardyce a year earlier, their goal difference improved by 22. They also won five of their last eight games, including 2–0 and 1–0 home victories against Chelsea and Arsenal.

Silva extended Everton's home winning streak to six games on 1 September 2019 for the first time since April 2017 with a 3–2 win over Wolverhampton Wanderers. He was dismissed on 5 December, after a 5–2 defeat to city rivals Liverpool which left the team in 18th place.

=== Fulham ===
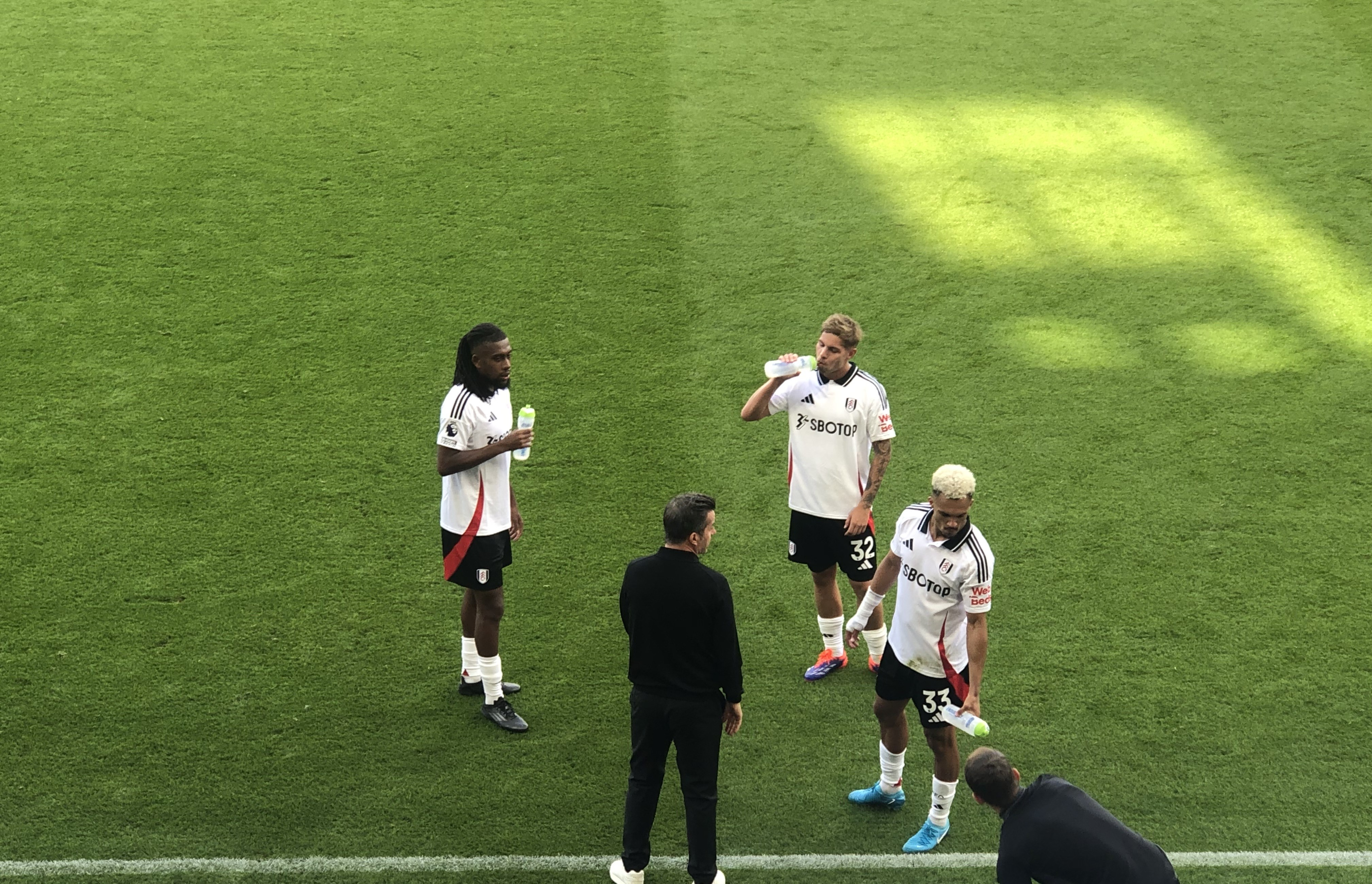
Silva instructing Fulham players during a match against West Ham United in September 2024

On 1 July 2021, Silva was appointed as head coach at recently relegated Championship club Fulham on a three-year contract, after Scott Parker had left to join Bournemouth. After leading them to 13 points out of a possible 15 in the first five matches of the season, he won the Manager of the Month award for August. In January 2022, the team scored 19 goals over three matches, making them the first English team since Chester City in 1933 to score six times or more in three consecutive fixtures; as a result, he earned another monthly accolade. On 19 April, the team secured an immediate return to the top division after a 3–0 win over Preston North End, confirming the league title two weeks later after beating Luton Town 7–0 and totalling 106 goals, a competition-best after Manchester City's 108 in 2001–02.

Silva apologised after being sent off due to improper conduct during a 3–1 defeat away to Manchester United in the FA Cup quarter-finals on 19 March 2023, following the dismissal of his player Willian for handball. On 4 April, he received a two-game ban for the events. In the post-season, following a tenth-place finish, he turned down offers from Saudi Pro League sides Al-Ahli and Al Hilal, with contract offers reported as being as high as £40 million over two years.

In October 2023, Silva agreed to a new deal until 2026. On 19 December, he led his team to their first ever League Cup semi-final, beating Everton on penalties before bowing out to Liverpool 3–2 on aggregate.

On 18 May 2025, Silva's Fulham broke their previous Premier League points tally with 54. This was achieved with a 3–2 away victory over Brentford, and they eventually finished 11th.

On 2 June 2026, Silva left as his contract was due to expire in the summer.

=== Benfica ===
On 9 June 2026, Benfica announced the appointment of Silva following the departure of José Mourinho; he agreed to a two-year deal with an option for a further season.

== Tactics ==
Silva tends to set his teams up in a 4–2–3–1 formation with an emphasis on progressive passing and wide positional rotations, notably the striker and number 10 swapping roles with both wingers joining the inside channels to create a tight attacking unit. Without the ball, he utilises a mid-block defensive position and a flat back four structure.

== Managerial statistics ==
As of match played 8 November 2026

Managerial record by team and tenure
Team	From	To	Record					Ref.
Team	From	To	P	W	D	L	Win %	Ref.
Estoril	27 September 2011	21 May 2014	116	54	31	31	46.6	
Sporting CP	21 May 2014	4 June 2015	53	31	15	7	58.5	
Olympiacos	8 July 2015	23 June 2016	48	38	3	7	79.2	
Hull City	5 January 2017	25 May 2017	22	8	3	11	36.4	
Watford	27 May 2017	21 January 2018	26	8	5	13	30.8	
Everton	31 May 2018	5 December 2019	60	24	12	24	40.0	
Fulham	1 July 2021	2 June 2026	229	100	48	81	43.7	
Benfica	9 June 2026	present	22	18	2	2	81.8	
Total			575	280	119	176	48.7	

== Honours ==
=== Manager ===
Estoril

- Segunda Liga: 2011–12

Sporting CP

- Taça de Portugal: 2014–15

Olympiacos

- Super League Greece: 2015–16

Fulham

- EFL Championship: 2021–22

Individual

- Segunda Liga Coach of the Year: 2011–12
- EFL Championship Manager of the Month: August 2021, January 2022
- EFL Championship Manager of the Year: 2021–22
