= Luís Pinto (footballer, born 1989) =

Portuguese player and manager

Personal information
- Full name: Luís Miguel Correia Pinto
- Date of birth: 1 April 1989 (age 37)
- Place of birth: Sé, Portugal
- Height: 1.85 m (6 ft 1 in)
- Position: Defender

Team information
- Current team: Gil Vicente (manager)

Youth career
- 1999–2005: Gondomar
- 2005–2008: Leixões

Senior career*
| Years | Team | Apps | (Gls) |
| 2008–2009 | Leixões | 0 | (0) |
| 2008–2009 | → Alpendorada (loan) | 7 | (0) |
| 2009–2011 | Avanca | 30 | (1) |
| 2012–2013 | Padroense | 3 | (0) |

Managerial career
- 2011–2013: Boavista (youth)
- 2013: Salgueiros (youth)
- 2013–2016: Trofense (assistant)
- 2016–2018: União Leiria (assistant)
- 2018: União Leiria
- 2019: Mirandela
- 2019–2020: Felgueiras 1932
- 2020–2021: Real Massamá
- 2021–2022: Leça
- 2022: Lusitânia Lourosa
- 2023–2024: Fafe
- 2024–2025: Tondela
- 2025–2026: Vitória Guimarães
- 2026–: Gil Vicente
- * Club domestic league appearances and goals

Luís Miguel Correia Pinto (born 1 April 1989) is a Portuguese football manager and former player who played as a defender. He is the manager of Primeira Liga club Gil Vicente.

Following a brief and lower-level playing career, Pinto began coaching in his early 20s and was first a head coach at União Leiria in 2018, aged 29. He began in Liga Portugal 2 with Tondela in 2024, winning promotion as champions in his only season. He then joined Vitória de Guimarães in the Primeira Liga, where he won the Taça da Liga in 2026.

== Coaching career ==
=== Early career ===
Born in Sé, Porto, Pinto began coaching at local Boavista F.C.'s youth teams in his early 20s. He went on to be assistant manager at C.D. Trofense and U.D. Leiria before succeeding Rui Amorim as manager of the latter in June 2018, aged 29. Eight months later he moved to SC Mirandela, also in the Campeonato de Portugal.

In June 2019, Pinto was hired at F.C. Felgueiras 1932 and tasked with taking the club into the professional leagues. On 23 November 2020, Real S.C. manager Hugo Martins announced his exit two hours before a Taça de Portugal match and Pinto replaced him, only to be replaced by Luís Loureiro in March after winning and losing six each of 14 fixtures.

For 2021–22, Pinto was hired at Leça F.C. and missed out on promotion to Liga 3 on the last day as Vilaverdense FC drew with C.S. Marítimo B. He also led the team to the quarter-finals of the domestic cup, defeating Primeira Liga sides F.C. Arouca and Gil Vicente F.C. before losing 4–0 at home to Sporting CP.

In June 2022, Pinto was hired at Lusitânia F.C. of the same league. He left by mutual consent on 19 December having won four and lost five of his 13 games.

On 23 January 2023, AD Fafe hired Pinto. He made his Liga 3 debut five days later in a 1–0 win at U.S.C. Paredes, ending a club run of seven games without a victory. Having helped the club avoid relegation, he was given another year in charge in June 2023, and kept the club in the league again before leaving.

=== Tondela ===
Pinto signed for C.D. Tondela on 30 May 2024, on a one-year contract with the option of a second. His professional debut at age 35 in Liga Portugal 2 came on 10 August, as the season opened with a 2–2 draw at C.S. Marítimo. He was voted Manager of the Month for September/October after winning all five games, scoring 15 goals and conceding three. His team overcame a four-game drawing start to the season, and a five-game run without a win in the middle of the campaign, to win the title with one more point than F.C. Alverca.

=== Vitória Guimarães ===
On 13 June 2025, Pinto signed a two-year deal with top-flight Vitória de Guimarães. On his top-flight debut on 11 August, the team lost 3–0 away to FC Porto. He led the team to their first-ever Taça da Liga in 2025–26, winning 3–1 away to Porto in the quarter-finals, 2–1 against Sporting CP in the semi-finals, and 2–1 against Minho derby rivals S.C. Braga in the final on 10 January. He was sacked on 10 March 2026 with the team ranked 9th in Primeira Liga.

=== Gil Vicente ===
On 20 June 2026, Pinto signed for Gil Vicente F.C. on a three-year contract. He replaced César Peixoto, who had joined Wolverhampton Wanderers.

== Honours ==
Tondela

- Liga Portugal 2: 2024–25

Vitória Guimarães

- Taça da Liga: 2025–26
