= Luís Gonçalves (football manager) =

Portuguese football manager

Personal information
- Full name: Luís Filipe de Jesus Vieira Duarte Gonçalves
- Date of birth: 27 February 1972 (age 54)
- Place of birth: Lourenço Marques, Portuguese Mozambique (present-day Maputo, Mozambique)

Managerial career
- Years: Team
- 1994–1996: AFD Torre (youth)
- 1996–1999: Estoril (youth)
- 1999–2000: Sporting CP U17 (assistant)
- 2000–2002: Sporting CP B (assistant)
- 2002–2011: Sporting CP U15
- 2011: 1º de Maio Sarilhense
- 2012: Marítimo Graciosa
- 2012: Pinhalnovense (assistant)
- 2013: Al-Ahli (youth)
- 2013: Atlético CP (assistant)
- 2014: Belenenses (assistant)
- 2014–2015: Porto U15
- 2015–2016: Tondela (assistant)
- 2016–2018: Mozambique (assistant)
- 2018–2019: China U16
- 2019–2021: Mozambique
- 2022–2023: Interclube

Luís Filipe de Jesus Vieira Duarte Gonçalves, known as Luís Gonçalves, is a Portuguese football manager.

In August 2019, he was appointed as manager of the Mozambique national football team.
