= Hugo Oliveira (football manager) =

Portuguese football manager (born 1979)

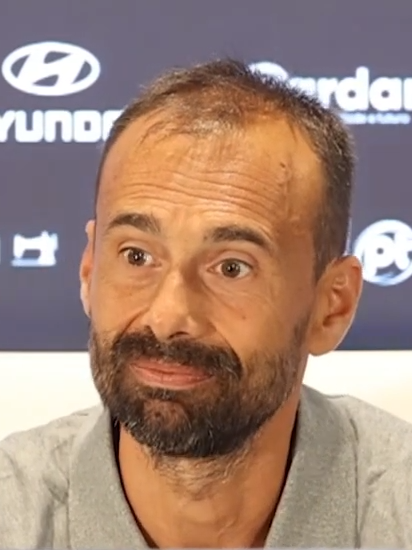
- Oliveira in 2025

Personal information
- Full name: Hugo Filipe Carvalho Oliveira
- Date of birth: 22 June 1979 (age 47)
- Place of birth: Penafiel, Portugal

Managerial career
- Years: Team
- 2024–2026: Famalicão
- 2026: Strasbourg

Hugo Filipe Carvalho Oliveira (born 22 June 1979) is a Portuguese football manager and goalkeeping coach.

He was a goalkeeping coach for several clubs, including four English teams under Marco Silva. He was head coach of Famalicão, leading them to 7th and 5th in the Primeira Liga, and managed Strasbourg in Ligue 1 in 2026.

== Coaching career ==
=== Goalkeeping coaching ===
Born in Termas de São Vicente, Penafiel, Oliveira began his career as a goalkeeping coach of Paredes in 2002. He would later work under the same capacity at Rebordosa, Marco, Gil Vicente and União de Leiria, before joining the Portuguese Football Federation in 2010.

Oliveira joined Benfica on 26 June 2011, also as a goalkeeping coach, and left the club exactly five years later after helping the side to win three league titles. On 5 January 2017, he joined Marco Silva's staff at Hull City.

Oliveira continued to work with Silva in the following years, at Watford, Everton and Fulham.

=== Famalicão ===
In early December 2024, Oliveira left Fulham to pursue a managerial career, and was unveiled as Famalicão manager on 10 December, signing a contract until 2026. His debut six days later was a 3–3 draw away to nearby Braga. He finished the season with the team in 7th.

On 28 March 2026, Oliveira extended his contract to 2028. He was voted the league's Manager of the Month with three wins and a draw in March, and goalkeeper Lazar Carević and defender Ibrahima Ba won their respective honours. In 2025–26, the club came 5th, missing out on Europe because Torreense won the 2026 Taça de Portugal final against Sporting CP.

=== Strasbourg ===
On 12 July 2026, Oliveira was appointed head coach of Ligue 1 side Strasbourg, on a three-year deal. His debut on 21 August was a 4–0 loss away to Marseille.

Oliveira won three of his 10 league fixtures for Strasbourg. On 18 November, with the club in 13th, he was replaced by compatriot Vítor Matos.

== Managerial statistics ==
As of match played 6 November 2026

Managerial record by team and tenure
Team	From	To	Record					Ref.
Team	From	To	P	W	D	L	Win %	Ref.
Famalicão	10 December 2024	11 July 2026	56	23	16	17	41.1	
Strasbourg	12 July 2026	18 November 2026	10	3	1	6	30.0	
Total			66	26	17	23	39.4	

== Honours ==
Individual

- Primeira Liga Manager of the Month: March 2026
