= 2022–23 Primeira Liga =

88th season of top-tier Portuguese football

Liga Portugal
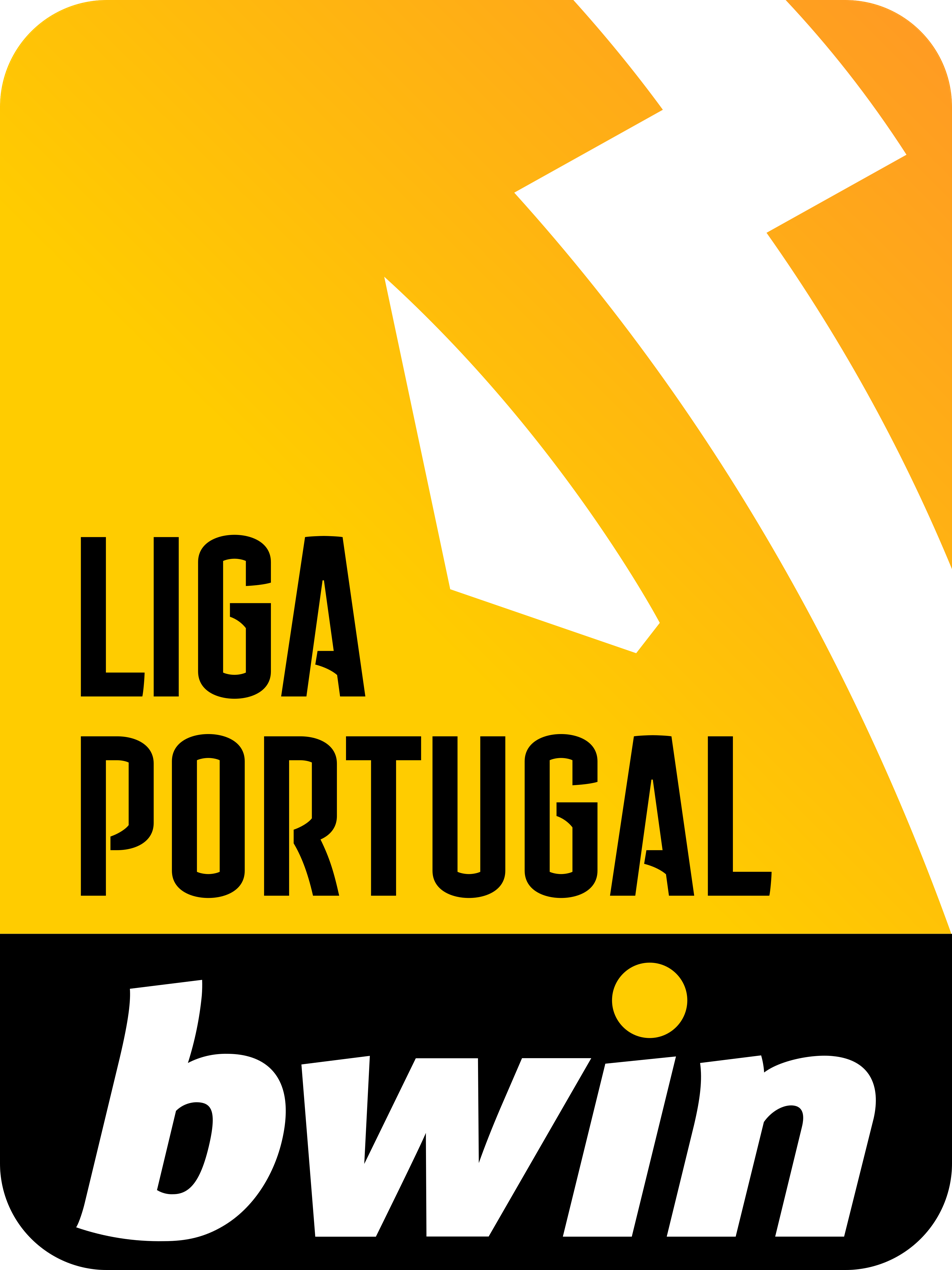
- Season: 2022–23
- Dates: 5 August 2022 – 27 May 2023
- Champions: Benfica; 38th title
- Relegated: Marítimo; Paços de Ferreira; Santa Clara
- Champions League: Benfica; Porto; Braga
- Europa League: Sporting CP
- Europa Conference League: Vitória de Guimarães; Arouca
- Matches: 306
- Goals: 742 (2.42 per match)
- Top goalscorer: Mehdi Taremi (22 goals)
- Biggest home win: Braga 5–0 Marítimo (21 August 2022); Benfica 5–0 Marítimo (18 September 2022); Benfica 5–0 Chaves (29 October 2022); Sporting CP 5–0 Braga (1 February 2023)
- Biggest away win: Arouca 0–6 Braga (28 August 2022)
- Highest scoring: Braga 5–3 Santa Clara (14 May 2023)
- Longest winning run: 10 matches Benfica
- Longest unbeaten run: 13 matches Benfica
- Longest winless run: 17 matches Santa Clara
- Longest losing run: 9 matches Santa Clara
- Highest attendance: 64,012; Benfica 3–0 Santa Clara (27 May 2023)
- Lowest attendance: 530; Casa Pia 2–1 Paços de Ferreira (6 March 2023)
- Attendance: 3,355,107 (10,964 per match)

The 2022–23 Liga Portugal (also known as Liga Portugal Bwin for sponsorship reasons) was the 89th season of the Primeira Liga, the top professional league for Portuguese association football clubs, and the second season under the current Liga Portugal Bwin title. This was the sixth Primeira Liga season to use video assistant referee (VAR). Benfica won the league, having secured a record 38th league title.

Porto were the defending champions, having won their 30th title at the previous season. Rio Ave, Casa Pia and Chaves joined as the promoted clubs from the 2021–22 Liga Portugal 2 replacing Belenenses SAD, Tondela and Moreirense, which were relegated to 2022–23 Liga Portugal 2.

As the 2022 FIFA World Cup was held between 20 November and 18 December 2022 due to the climatic conditions of the host country Qatar, the league featured an extended pause during the season. As national team players had to be released by their clubs on 14 November 2022, the last Primeira Liga matchday before the break was scheduled for 13 November (matchday 13). The league resumed nine weeks later on 28 December.

== Teams ==
=== Changes ===
The three teams promoted from the 2021–22 Liga Portugal 2 were Rio Ave (finishing first, promoted after a one-year absence), Casa Pia (finishing second, promoted after an 83-year absence) and Chaves (won promotion play-offs, promoted after a three-year absence), replacing Moreirense (relegated after eight years), Tondela (relegated after seven years) and Belenenses SAD (never relegated before). (Note: Belenenses SAD were founded in June 2018. When they were founded, they immediately replaced C.F. Os Belenenses in the Primeira Liga, who had been promoted to the Primeira Liga in 2013 (nine years before this season).)

=== Stadia and locations ===
Location of teams in 2022–23 Primeira Liga (Mainland)
Location of teams in 2022–23 Primeira Liga (Madeira)
Location of teams in 2022–23 Primeira Liga (Azores)

Team	Location	Stadium	Capacity	2021–22
Arouca	Arouca	Estádio Municipal de Arouca	5,600	15th
Benfica	Lisbon	Estádio da Luz	64,642	3rd
Boavista	Porto	Estádio do Bessa	28,263	12th
Braga	Braga	Estádio Municipal de Braga	30,286	4th
Casa Pia	Lisbon	Estádio Municipal de Rio Maior	7,000	2nd (LP2)
Chaves	Chaves	Estádio Municipal Eng.º; Manuel Branco Teixeira	8,396	3rd (LP2)
Estoril	Estoril	Estádio António Coimbra da Mota	5,100	9th
Famalicão	Vila Nova de Famalicão	Estádio Municipal 22 de Junho	5,186	8th
Gil Vicente	Barcelos	Estádio Cidade de Barcelos	12,046	5th
Marítimo	Funchal	Estádio do Marítimo	10,600	10th
Paços de Ferreira	Paços de Ferreira	Estádio Capital do Móvel	9,076	11th
Portimonense	Portimão	Estádio Municipal de Portimão	6,204	13th
Porto	Porto	Estádio do Dragão	50,033	1st
Rio Ave	Vila do Conde	Estádio dos Arcos	5,300	1st (LP2)
Santa Clara	Ponta Delgada	Estádio de São Miguel	12,500	7th
Sporting CP	Lisbon	Estádio José Alvalade	50,095	2nd
Vitória de Guimarães	Guimarães	Estádio D. Afonso Henriques	30,029	6th
Vizela	Vizela	Estádio do FC Vizela	6,000	14th

=== Personnel and sponsors ===
Team	Manager	Captain	Kit Manufacturer	Main Sponsor
Arouca	(Portugal) Armando Evangelista	(Brazil) João Basso	Skita	Construções; Carlos Pinho
Benfica	(Germany) Roger Schmidt	(Argentina) Nicolás Otamendi	Adidas	Emirates
Boavista	(Portugal) Petit	(Brazil) Rafael Bracali	Kelme	Placard
Braga	(Portugal) Artur Jorge	(Portugal) Ricardo Horta	Hummel	Moosh
Casa Pia	(Portugal) Filipe Martins	(Portugal) Vasco Fernandes	Macron	ESC Online
Chaves	(Portugal) Vítor Campelos	(Portugal) João Teixeira	Lacatoni	Forte de São; Francisco Hotel
Estoril	(Portugal) Ricardo Soares	(Portugal) Joãozinho	Kappa	Solverde
Famalicão	(Portugal) João Pedro Sousa	(Brazil) Riccieli	Macron	Placard
Gil Vicente	(Portugal) Daniel Sousa	(Portugal) Rúben Fernandes	Lacatoni	Barcelos Tourism
Marítimo	(Portugal) José Gomes	(Portugal) Edgar Costa	Puma	Betano
Paços de Ferreira	(Portugal) César Peixoto	(Portugal) Antunes	Joma	Solverde
Portimonense	(Portugal) Paulo Sérgio	(Portugal) Pedro Sá	Mizuno	McDonald's
Porto	(Portugal) Sérgio Conceição	(Portugal) Pepe	New Balance	Betano
Rio Ave	(Portugal) Luís Freire	(Portugal) Vítor Gomes	Puma	MEO
Santa Clara	(Brazil) Danildo Accioly	(Senegal) Pierre Sagna	Kelme	Solverde
Sporting CP	(Portugal) Ruben Amorim	(Uruguay) Sebastián Coates	Nike	Betano
Vitória de Guimarães	(Portugal) Moreno	(Portugal) Tiago Silva	Macron	Placard
Vizela	(Portugal) Manuel Tulipa	(Portugal) Kiki Afonso	Lacatoni	Vizela Tourism

=== Managerial changes ===
Team	Outgoing manager	Manner	Date of vacancy	Pos in table	Incoming manager	Date of appointment	Ref.
Benfica	(Portugal) Nélson Veríssimo	End of caretaker role	15 May 2022	Pre-season	(Germany) Roger Schmidt	1 June 2022	
Braga	(Portugal) Carlos Carvalhal	Resigned	15 May 2022	Pre-season	(Portugal) Artur Jorge	1 June 2022	
Gil Vicente	(Portugal) Ricardo Soares	Signed by Al-Ahly	28 June 2022	Pre-season	(Portugal) Ivo Vieira	28 June 2022	
Estoril	(Portugal) Bruno Pinheiro	Mutual consent	1 July 2022	Pre-season	(Portugal) Nélson Veríssimo	2 July 2022	
Vitória de Guimarães	(Portugal) Pepa	Suspended and fired	12 July 2022	Pre-season	(Portugal) Moreno	13 July 2022	
Marítimo	(Portugal) Vasco Seabra	Sacked	5 September 2022	18th	(Portugal) João Henriques	8 September 2022	
Famalicão	(Portugal) Rui Pedro Silva	Mutual consent	20 September 2022	16th	(Portugal) João Pedro Sousa	22 September 2022	
Paços de Ferreira	(Portugal) César Peixoto	Sacked	16 October 2022	17th	(Portugal) José Mota	18 October 2022	
Gil Vicente	(Portugal) Ivo Vieira	Sacked	2 November 2022	16th	(Portugal) Carlos Cunha (caretaker)	2 November 2022	
Gil Vicente	(Portugal) Carlos Cunha (caretaker)	End of interim spell	14 November 2022	16th	(Portugal) Daniel Sousa	14 November 2022	
Vizela	(Portugal) Álvaro Pacheco	Sacked	30 November 2022	13th	(Portugal) Tulipa (caretaker)	30 November 2022	
Marítimo	(Portugal) João Henriques	Sacked	15 December 2022	17th	(Portugal) José Gomes	15 December 2022	
Paços de Ferreira	(Portugal) José Mota	Sacked	16 December 2022	18th	(Portugal) Marco Paiva (caretaker)	31 December 2022	
Paços de Ferreira	(Portugal) Marco Paiva (caretaker)	End of caretaker role	31 December 2022	18th	(Portugal) César Peixoto	1 January 2023	
Santa Clara	(Portugal) Mário Silva	Sacked	6 January 2023	15th	(Portugal) Jorge Simão	11 January 2023	
Estoril	(Portugal) Nélson Veríssimo	Sacked	24 February 2023	15th	(Portugal) Ricardo Soares	28 February 2023	
Santa Clara	(Portugal) Jorge Simão	Sacked	26 February 2023	17th	(Brazil) Danildo Accioly	26 February 2023	

== League table ==
Pos	Team	Pld	W	D	L	GF	GA	GD	Pts	Qualification or relegation
1	Benfica (C)	34	28	3	3	82	20	+62	87	Qualification for the Champions League group stage
2	Porto	34	27	4	3	73	22	+51	85	Qualification for the Champions League group stage
3	Braga	34	25	3	6	75	30	+45	78	Qualification for the Champions League third qualifying round
4	Sporting CP	34	23	5	6	71	32	+39	74	Qualification for the Europa League group stage
5	Arouca	34	15	9	10	36	37	−1	54	Qualification for the Europa Conference League third qualifying round
6	Vitória de Guimarães	34	16	5	13	34	39	−5	53	Qualification for the Europa Conference League second qualifying round
7	Chaves	34	12	10	12	35	40	−5	46	
8	Famalicão	34	13	5	16	39	47	−8	44	
9	Boavista	34	12	8	14	43	54	−11	44	
10	Casa Pia	34	11	8	15	31	40	−9	41	
11	Vizela	34	11	7	16	34	38	−4	40 (Note: Vizela finished ahead of Rio Ave on head-to-head points: Rio Ave 0–1 Vizela, Vizela 3–1 Rio Ave.)	
12	Rio Ave	34	10	10	14	36	43	−7	40	
13	Gil Vicente	34	10	7	17	32	41	−9	37	
14	Estoril	34	10	5	19	33	49	−16	35	
15	Portimonense	34	10	4	20	25	48	−23	34	
16	Marítimo (R)	34	7	5	22	32	63	−31	26	Qualification for the relegation play-offs
17	Paços de Ferreira (R)	34	6	5	23	26	62	−36	23	Relegation to Liga Portugal 2
18	Santa Clara (R)	34	5	7	22	26	58	−32	22	Relegation to Liga Portugal 2

Source: Liga Portugal
Rules for classification: 1) Points; 2) Head-to-head points; 3) Head-to-head goal difference; 4) Goal difference; 5) Matches won; 6) Goals scored; 7) Play-off.
(C) Champions; (R) Relegated

== Relegation play-offs ==
The relegation play-offs took place on 3 and 11 June 2023, between Marítimo, who finished 16th in the Primeira Liga, and Estrela da Amadora, who finished 3rd in Liga Portugal 2.

All times are WEST (UTC+1).

Team 1	Agg.	Team 2	1st leg	2nd leg
Estrela da Amadora	3–3 (3–2 p)	Marítimo	2–1	1–2 (a.e.t.)

3 June 2023
20:00

Estrela da Amadora	2–1	Marítimo
Régis N'do 3'; Jean Felipe 80'	Report	Cláudio Winck 87'

Estádio José Gomes, Amadora
Attendance: 6,928
Referee: André Narciso (Portugal)
11 June 2023
20:15

Marítimo	2–1 (a.e.t.)	Estrela da Amadora
Xadas 18'; Ramírez 90+6'	Report	Lopes 26'
Penalties
Cláudio Winck (penalty scored); Mendes (penalty missed); Vidigal (penalty scored); Ramírez (penalty missed); Correia (penalty missed)	2–3	(penalty scored) Jean Felipe; (penalty scored) Mansur; (penalty missed) Aloísio; (penalty scored) Vito

Estádio do Marítimo, Funchal, Madeira
Attendance: 10,035
Referee: João Pinheiro (Portugal)

== Results ==
Home \ Away	ARO	BEN	BOA	BRA	CAS	CHA	EST	FAM	GIL	MAR	PAC	PTM	POR	RAV	STA	SPO	VSC	VIZ
Arouca	—	0–3	1–2	0–6	2–0	1–0	2–0	4–1	1–0	1–0	1–1	4–0	0–1	0–1	1–0	1–0	2–2	1–0
Benfica	4–0	—	3–1	1–0	3–0	5–0	1–0	2–0	3–1	5–0	3–2	1–0	1–2	4–2	3–0	2–2	5–1	2–1
Boavista	0–0	0–3	—	1–1	0–0	1–1	1–0	1–2	1–0	1–1	1–0	4–2	1–4	3–2	2–1	2–1	2–1	2–2
Braga	2–0	3–0	1–0	—	0–1	0–1	4–1	4–1	1–0	5–0	3–0	4–1	0–0	2–0	5–3	3–3	1–0	2–0
Casa Pia	0–0	0–1	2–0	0–1	—	1–2	2–2	1–0	1–3	2–0	2–1	1–1	0–0	1–0	2–1	3–4	0–0	0–1
Chaves	1–1	1–0	1–4	1–2	1–0	—	1–1	0–2	3–1	2–1	2–0	2–0	1–3	1–1	0–0	2–3	0–1	1–1
Estoril	2–0	1–5	2–1	0–2	2–0	0–2	—	2–0	1–0	3–1	1–3	0–1	1–1	2–2	3–0	0–2	0–1	0–3
Famalicão	0–1	0–1	4–0	0–3	1–0	1–2	1–0	—	0–1	3–2	2–1	1–0	2–4	0–0	1–0	1–2	2–1	2–1
Gil Vicente	1–1	0–2	3–1	0–1	1–0	0–0	0–1	0–0	—	2–0	1–0	1–2	0–2	2–2	1–0	0–0	2–1	1–1
Marítimo	1–1	0–3	4–2	1–2	1–2	1–2	1–0	0–0	1–2	—	3–1	0–1	0–2	2–2	3–1	1–0	1–2	1–0
Paços de Ferreira	1–1	0–2	1–3	1–2	2–3	1–1	0–3	1–3	2–1	0–1	—	0–3	0–2	3–1	1–0	0–4	0–1	0–2
Portimonense	0–2	1–5	0–1	1–2	1–2	1–0	1–1	1–0	1–0	2–1	1–0	—	0–2	2–2	0–0	0–1	2–1	0–1
Porto	5–1	0–1	1–0	4–1	2–1	3–0	3–2	4–1	1–2	5–1	4–0	1–0	—	1–0	2–1	3–0	3–0	2–0
Rio Ave	1–0	0–1	1–0	2–3	1–1	1–0	2–0	2–2	2–1	1–1	0–1	1–0	3–1	—	1–0	0–1	0–1	0–1
Santa Clara	1–2	0–3	2–2	0–4	0–0	1–1	2–1	1–3	3–2	2–1	1–1	1–0	1–1	0–2	—	1–2	1–3	0–1
Sporting CP	1–1	2–2	3–0	5–0	3–1	0–2	2–0	2–1	3–1	2–1	3–0	4–0	1–2	3–0	3–0	—	3–0	2–1
Vitória de Guimarães	0–2	0–0	3–2	2–1	0–1	2–1	1–0	3–2	1–0	1–0	0–0	1–0	0–1	0–0	1–0	0–2	—	3–0
Vizela	0–1	0–2	1–1	0–4	3–1	0–0	0–1	0–0	2–2	3–0	1–2	1–0	0–1	3–1	0–1	1–2	3–0	—

Source: Liga Portugal
Legend: Blue = home team win; Yellow = draw; Red = away team win.
For upcoming matches, an "a" indicates there is an article about the rivalry between the two participants.

=== Positions by round ===
The table lists the positions of teams after each week of matches. In order to preserve chronological evolvements, any postponed matches are not included to the round at which they were originally scheduled, but added to the full round they were played immediately afterwards.

Team ╲ Round	1	2	3	4	5	6	7	8	9	10	11	12	13	14	15	16	17	18	19	20	21	22	23	24	25	26	27	28	29	30	31	32	33	34
Benfica	2	2	2	1	1	1	1	1	1	1	1	1	1	1	1	1	1	1	1	1	1	1	1	1	1	1	1	1	1	1	1	1	1	1
Porto	1	1	1	3	3	3	3	2	2	3	3	2	2	2	3	3	3	2	2	2	2	2	2	2	2	2	2	2	2	2	2	2	2	2
Braga	8	5	3	2	2	2	2	3	3	2	2	3	3	3	2	2	2	3	3	3	3	3	3	3	3	3	3	3	3	3	3	3	3	3
Sporting CP	9	6	10	13	9	7	8	7	6	4	6	5	4	4	4	4	4	4	4	4	4	4	4	4	4	4	4	4	4	4	4	4	4	4
Arouca	18	12	7	10	10	12	12	13	11	11	10	8	9	10	7	7	6	7	7	7	7	6	7	6	6	5	5	5	5	5	5	6	6	5
Vitória de Guimarães	4	4	5	8	11	9	9	9	9	6	5	6	6	6	6	6	7	6	6	5	5	5	5	5	5	6	6	6	7	6	6	5	5	6
Chaves	12	9	11	6	6	10	11	11	10	9	11	11	8	9	10	9	8	10	9	8	9	13	13	13	11	11	11	10	10	8	7	7	7	7
Famalicão	16	18	16	15	16	16	16	15	15	14	14	14	15	14	13	14	15	12	13	15	13	10	12	9	9	10	9	8	6	7	8	8	8	8
Boavista	4	3	6	9	5	5	5	6	5	7	7	9	11	12	8	11	11	9	8	9	11	8	8	10	12	13	12	12	11	12	10	10	10	9
Casa Pia	10	14	9	7	7	6	6	4	4	5	4	4	5	5	5	5	5	5	5	6	6	7	6	7	7	7	8	9	9	10	9	9	9	10
Vizela	4	10	12	11	12	13	14	14	12	13	12	13	13	11	12	8	9	8	10	10	8	11	9	11	10	8	7	7	8	9	11	11	11	11
Rio Ave	12	15	15	14	13	14	13	10	13	12	13	12	10	7	9	10	10	11	14	12	12	9	11	8	8	9	10	11	12	11	12	12	12	12
Gil Vicente	4	10	13	12	14	11	10	12	14	15	16	16	16	16	16	15	14	15	15	14	14	12	10	12	13	12	13	13	14	14	14	14	14	13
Estoril	3	8	8	5	8	8	7	8	7	8	8	10	12	13	14	13	13	14	12	13	15	15	15	15	15	15	15	15	15	15	15	15	15	14
Portimonense	12	7	4	4	4	4	4	5	8	10	9	7	7	8	11	12	12	13	11	11	11	14	14	14	14	14	14	14	13	13	13	13	13	15
Marítimo	17	17	18	18	18	18	18	18	18	18	17	17	17	17	17	17	17	17	17	17	17	16	16	16	17	16	16	16	16	16	16	16	16	16
Paços de Ferreira	12	15	17	17	17	17	17	17	17	17	18	18	18	18	18	18	18	18	18	18	18	18	18	17	16	17	17	17	17	17	17	17	17	17
Santa Clara	10	13	14	16	15	15	15	16	16	16	15	15	14	15	15	16	16	16	16	16	16	17	17	18	18	18	18	18	18	18	18	18	18	18

Leader and Champions League group stage
Champions League group stage
Champions League third qualifying round
Europa League group stage
Europa Conference League third qualifying round
Europa Conference League second qualifying round
Relegation Play-off
Relegation to Liga Portugal 2

Source: Liga Portugal

== Statistics ==
=== Top goalscorers ===
Rank	Player	Club	Goals
1	(Iran) Mehdi Taremi	Porto	22
2	(Portugal) Gonçalo Ramos	Benfica	19
3	(Portugal) João Mário	Benfica	17
3	(Spain) Fran Navarro	Gil Vicente	17
5	(Portugal) Pedro Gonçalves	Sporting	15
6	(Portugal) Ricardo Horta	Braga	14
7	(The Gambia) Yusupha Njie	Boavista	13
8	(France) Simon Banza	Braga	11
9	(Portugal) Iuri Medeiros	Braga	10
9	(Portugal) Francisco Trincão	Sporting	10

==== Hat-tricks ====
Player	For	Against	Result	Date
(Iran) Mehdi Taremi	Porto	Arouca	5–1 (H)	28 December 2022
(Portugal) Francisco Trincão	Sporting	Casa Pia	4–3 (A)	9 April 2023
(Iran) Mehdi Taremi^{4}	Porto	Famalicão	4–2 (A)	20 May 2023

Notes

(H) – Home team
(A) – Away team
^{4} Player scored four goals.

=== Top assists ===
Rank	Player	Club	Assists
1	(Portugal) Pedro Gonçalves	Sporting	11
2	(Brazil) David Neres	Benfica	9
2	(Spain) Álex Grimaldo	Benfica	9
4	(Portugal) Ricardo Horta	Braga	8
5	(Iran) Mehdi Taremi	Porto	7
5	(Portugal) Ricardo Horta	Braga	7
5	(Portugal) Otávio	Porto	7
5	(Portugal) Ivo Rodrigues	Famalicão	7
5	(Brazil) Pepê	Porto	7
5	(Portugal) João Mário	Benfica	7
5	(Portugal) Tiago Santos	Estoril	7

=== Clean sheets ===
Rank	Player	Club	Clean sheets
1	(Greece) Odysseas Vlachodimos	Benfica	21
2	(Brazil) Matheus	Braga	16
2	(Portugal) Diogo Costa	Porto	16
4	(Uruguay) Ignacio de Arruabarrena	Arouca	14
5	(Portugal) Bruno Varela	Vitória de Guimarães	13
5	(Spain) Antonio Adán	Sporting CP	13
7	(Portugal) Ricardo Batista	Casa Pia	11
7	(Croatia) Fabijan Buntić	Vizela	11
9	(Brazil) Jhonatan	Rio Ave	10
9	(Brazil) Luiz Júnior	Famalicão	10

=== Discipline ===
==== Player ====
- Most yellow cards: 17
  - (Portugal) Guima (Chaves)
- Most red cards: 2
  - (Portugal) Tiago Silva (Vitória de Guimarães)
  - (Portugal) Edgar Costa (Marítimo)
  - (United States) Reggie Cannon (Boavista)
  - (Brazil) Maracás (Paços de Ferreira)
  - (Brazil) Renê Santos (Marítimo)
  - (France) Sikou Niakaté (Braga)
  - (England) Jerome Opoku (Arouca)

==== Club ====
- Most yellow cards: 106
  - Santa Clara
  - Vitória de Guimarães
- Most red cards: 10
  - Paços de Ferreira
  - Chaves
  - Marítimo
  - Vitória de Guimarães

== Awards ==
=== Monthly awards ===
Month	Player of the Month		Goalkeeper of the Month		Defender of the Month		Midfielder of the Month		Forward of the Month		Manager of the Month		Goal of the Month	
Month	Player	Club	Player	Club	Player	Club	Player	Club	Player	Club	Manager	Club	Player	Club
August	(France) Simon Banza	Braga	(Portugal) Ricardo Batista	Casa Pia	(Brazil) Morato	Benfica	(Argentina) Enzo Fernández	Benfica	(France) Simon Banza	Braga	(Germany) Roger Schmidt	Benfica	(Brazil) Rildo	Santa Clara
September	(Iran) Mehdi Taremi	Porto	(Greece) Odysseas Vlachodimos	Benfica	(Portugal) António Silva	Benfica	(Canada) Stephen Eustáquio	Porto	(Iran) Mehdi Taremi	Porto	(Portugal) Filipe Martins	Casa Pia	(Portugal) Bruno Lourenço	Boavista
October/November	(Portugal) Gonçalo Ramos	Benfica	(Portugal) Diogo Costa	Porto	(Portugal) António Silva	Benfica	(Argentina) Enzo Fernández	Benfica	(Portugal) Gonçalo Ramos	Benfica	(Germany) Roger Schmidt	Benfica	N/A	N/A
December/January	(Portugal) João Mário	Benfica	(Portugal) Diogo Costa	Porto	(Spain) Álex Grimaldo	Benfica	(Portugal) João Mário	Benfica	(Spain) Fran Navarro	Gil Vicente	(Germany) Roger Schmidt	Benfica	N/A	N/A
February	(Portugal) João Mário	Benfica	(Portugal) Diogo Costa	Porto	(Spain) Álex Grimaldo	Benfica	(Portugal) João Mário	Benfica	(Spain) Fran Navarro	Gil Vicente	(Portugal) João Aroso (Note: Aroso was awarded the prize, due to Moreno not having the required coaching level to manage Vitória de Guimarães.)	Vitória de Guimarães	(Brazil) Matheus Reis	Sporting
March	(Portugal) Gonçalo Ramos	Benfica	(Brazil) Matheus	Braga	(Brazil) João Basso	Arouca	(Portugal) João Mário	Benfica	(Portugal) Gonçalo Ramos	Benfica	(Portugal) Armando Evangelista	Arouca	(Portugal) Nuno Santos	Sporting
April	(Portugal) Ricardo Horta	Braga	(Uruguay) Ignacio de Arruabarrena	Arouca	(Portugal) Pepe	Porto	(Spain) Iván Jaime	Famalicão	(Portugal) Ricardo Horta	Braga	(Portugal) Artur Jorge	Braga	(Portugal) Bruno Lourenço	Boavista

=== Annual awards ===
Award	Winner	Club
Player of the Season	(Portugal) Otávio	Porto
Manager of the Season	(Germany) Roger Schmidt	Benfica
Young Player of the Season	(Spain) Iván Jaime	Famalicão
Top scorer	(Iran) Mehdi Taremi	Porto

Team of the Year

Team of the Year
Goalkeeper	(Portugal) Diogo Costa (Porto)				
Defence	(Portugal) António Silva (Benfica)	(Portugal) Pepe (Porto)	(Argentina) Nicolás Otamendi (Benfica)	(Spain) Álex Grimaldo (Benfica)	
Midfield	(Iran) Mehdi Taremi (Porto)	(Portugal) Otávio (Porto)	(Uruguay) Manuel Ugarte (Sporting CP)	(Portugal) João Mário (Benfica)	(Portugal) Ricardo Horta (Braga)
Attack	(Portugal) Gonçalo Ramos (Benfica)				

== Number of teams by district ==
Rank	District Football Associations	Number	Teams
1	Braga	5	Braga, Famalicão, Gil Vicente, Vitória de Guimarães and Vizela
2	Lisbon	4	Casa Pia, Benfica, Estoril and Sporting CP
2	Porto	4	Boavista, Paços de Ferreira, Porto and Rio Ave
4	Aveiro	1	Arouca
4	Faro	1	Portimonense
4	Funchal	1	Marítimo
4	Ponta Delgada	1	Santa Clara
4	Vila Real	1	Chaves

== Attendances ==
#	Club	Average	Highest
1	Benfica	57,107	64,012
2	Porto	41,380	49,499
3	Sporting	29,292	39,528
4	Vitória	16,116	22,733
5	Braga	15,490	22,256
6	Marítimo	8,509	10,547
7	Boavista	6,520	11,335
8	Gil Vicente	4,528	11,694
9	Paços	4,428	8,060
10	Chaves	3,896	8,297
11	Famalicão	3,800	4,992
12	Casa Pia	3,422	22,253
13	Vizela	3,310	5,872
14	Rio Ave	2,906	4,134
15	Estoril	2,524	4,858
16	Santa Clara	2,160	9,701
17	Portimonense	1,945	4,474
18	Arouca	1,836	4,614
