= 2023–24 Primeira Liga =

89th season of top-tier Portuguese football

Primeira Liga
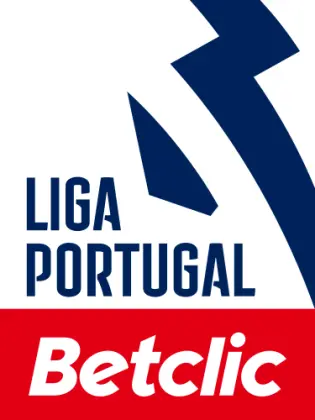
- Season: 2023–24
- Dates: 11 August 2023 – 19 May 2024
- Champions: Sporting CP; 20th title
- Relegated: Portimonense (via play-off); Vizela; Chaves
- Champions League: Sporting CP; Benfica
- Europa League: Porto; Braga
- Conference League: Vitória de Guimarães
- Matches: 306
- Goals: 877 (2.87 per match)
- Top goalscorer: Viktor Gyökeres (29 goals)
- Biggest home win: Sporting CP 8–0 Casa Pia (29 January 2024)
- Biggest away win: Rio Ave 0–4 Moreirense (1 October 2023); Boavista 0–4 Arouca (3 December 2023); Vizela 0–4 Casa Pia (31 March 2024)
- Highest scoring: Gil Vicente 5–3 Estoril (17 September 2023); Sporting CP 8–0 Casa Pia (29 January 2024); Portimonense 3–5 Braga (1 April 2024)
- Longest winning run: 8 matches Sporting CP
- Longest unbeaten run: 22 matches Benfica
- Longest winless run: 11 matches Boavista
- Longest losing run: 7 matches Arouca
- Highest attendance: 62,247; Benfica 1–0 Porto (29 September 2023)
- Lowest attendance: 944; Moreirense 1–4 Casa Pia (8 January 2024)
- Total attendance: 3,707,290 (306 matches)
- Average attendance: 12,115

The 2023–24 Liga Portugal (also known as Liga Portugal Betclic for sponsorship reasons) was the 90th season of the Primeira Liga, the top professional league for Portuguese association football clubs and the first season under the current Liga Portugal Betclic title. This was the seventh Primeira Liga season to use video assistant referee (VAR). Benfica were the defending champions, having won their 38th title the previous season.

Since Portugal dropped from sixth to seventh place in the UEFA association coefficient rankings at the end of 2022–23 season, only the two best-ranked teams could qualify for the UEFA Champions League (the champions entered directly into the group stage, and the runners-up entered the third qualifying round). The Taça de Portugal winner qualified to the UEFA Europa League group stage, while the third-placed team qualified to the UEFA Europa League second qualifying round. The fourth-placed team, meanwhile, qualified to the UEFA Conference League second qualifying round.

On 5 May, Sporting CP were confirmed as champions with two matches to spare following Benfica's 2–0 away defeat to Famalicão, clinching the club's 20th league title and first since the 2020–21 season.

== Teams ==
Eighteen teams competed in the league – the top fifteen teams from the previous season and the three teams promoted from the Liga Portugal 2. The promoted teams were Moreirense, Farense (returning to the top flight after a one and two years absence, respectively), and Estrela da Amadora (promoted for the first time in history in its current form founded in 2020 or after a fourteen-year absence if counting the club that dissolved in 2011 due to bankruptcy). They replaced Marítimo, Paços de Ferreira, and Santa Clara, who were relegated to the Liga Portugal 2 after respective spells of thirty-eight, four, and five years in the top flight.

This league season marked the first time since 1984–85 to have no teams from the Azores or Madeira islands in the top-flight.

=== Stadia and locations ===
Location of teams in 2023–24 Primeira Liga
Lisbon area teams

| Team | Location | Stadium | Capacity | 2022–23 |
|---|---|---|---|---|
| Arouca | Arouca | Estádio Municipal de Arouca | 5,600 | 5th |
| Benfica | Lisbon | Estádio da Luz | 64,642 | 1st |
| Boavista | Porto | Estádio do Bessa | 28,263 | 9th |
| Braga | Braga | Estádio Municipal de Braga | 30,286 | 3rd |
| Casa Pia | Lisbon | Estádio Municipal de Rio Maior* | 7,000 | 10th |
| Chaves | Chaves | Estádio Municipal Eng.º; Manuel Branco Teixeira | 8,396 | 7th |
| Estoril | Estoril | Estádio António Coimbra da Mota | 5,100 | 14th |
| Estrela da Amadora | Amadora | Estádio José Gomes | 9,288 | 3rd (LP2) |
| Famalicão | Vila Nova de Famalicão | Estádio Municipal 22 de Junho | 5,186 | 8th |
| Farense | Faro | Estádio de São Luís | 7,000 | 2nd (LP2) |
| Gil Vicente | Barcelos | Estádio Cidade de Barcelos | 12,046 | 13th |
| Moreirense | Moreira de Cónegos | Parque de Jogos Comendador; Joaquim de Almeida Freitas | 6,150 | 1st (LP2) |
| Portimonense | Portimão | Estádio Municipal de Portimão | 4,961 | 15th |
| Porto | Porto | Estádio do Dragão | 50,033 | 2nd |
| Rio Ave | Vila do Conde | Estádio dos Arcos | 5,300 | 12th |
| Sporting CP | Lisbon | Estádio José Alvalade | 50,095 | 4th |
| Vitória de Guimarães | Guimarães | Estádio D. Afonso Henriques | 30,029 | 6th |
| Vizela | Vizela | Estádio do FC Vizela | 6,000 | 11th |

- Estádio Pina Manique official stadium, not licensed for competition

=== Personnel and sponsors ===
| Team | Manager | Captain | Kit Manufacturer | Main Sponsor |
|---|---|---|---|---|
| Arouca | (Portugal) Daniel Sousa | (Portugal) David Simão | Skita | Construções; Carlos Pinho |
| Benfica | (Germany) Roger Schmidt | (Argentina) Nicolás Otamendi | Adidas | Emirates |
| Boavista | (Portugal) Jorge Simão | (Colombia) Sebastián Pérez | Kelme | Placard |
| Braga | (Portugal) Rui Duarte | (Portugal) Ricardo Horta | Puma | Moosh |
| Casa Pia | (Portugal) Gonçalo Santos | (Brazil) Ângelo Neto | Adidas | ESC Online |
| Chaves | (Portugal) Moreno | (Cape Verde) João Correia | Lacatoni | Forte de São; Francisco Hotel |
| Estoril | (Portugal) Vasco Seabra | (Portugal) Dani Figueira | Kappa | Solverde |
| Estrela da Amadora | (Portugal) Sérgio Vieira | (Angola) Kialonda Gaspar | Umbro | Various Sponsors |
| Famalicão | (Portugal) Armando Evangelista | (Brazil) Riccieli | Macron | Placard |
| Farense | (Portugal) José Mota | (Brazil) Fabrício Isidoro | Lacatoni | Placard |
| Gil Vicente | (Portugal) Tozé Marreco | (Portugal) Rúben Fernandes | Lacatoni | Barcelos Tourism |
| Moreirense | (Portugal) Rui Borges | (Portugal) Pedro Amador | CDT | Placard |
| Portimonense | (Portugal) Paulo Sérgio | (Brazil) Carlinhos | Mizuno | Ceremony |
| Porto | (Portugal) Sérgio Conceição | (Portugal) Pepe | New Balance | Betano |
| Rio Ave | (Portugal) Luís Freire | (Portugal) Vítor Gomes | Puma | Solverde |
| Sporting CP | (Portugal) Ruben Amorim | (Uruguay) Sebastián Coates | Nike | Betano |
| Vitória de Guimarães | (Portugal) Álvaro Pacheco | (Portugal) André André | Macron | Placard |
| Vizela | (Spain) Rubén de la Barrera | (Portugal) Samu | Kappa | Solverde |

=== Managerial changes ===
| Team | Outgoing manager | Manner | Date of vacancy | Pos in table | Incoming manager | Date of appointment | Ref. |
|---|---|---|---|---|---|---|---|
| Arouca | (Portugal) Armando Evangelista | Signed by Goiás | 29 May 2023 | Pre-season | (Portugal) Daniel Ramos | 29 May 2023 | |
| Vizela | (Portugal) Manuel Tulipa | Mutual agreement | 31 May 2023 | Pre-season | (Spain) Pablo Villar | 2 June 2023 | |
| Moreirense | (Portugal) Paulo Alves | End of contract | 11 May 2023 | Pre-season | (Portugal) Rui Borges | 1 July 2023 | |
| Chaves | (Portugal) Vítor Campelos | End of contract | 2 June 2023 | Pre-season | (Portugal) José Gomes | 16 June 2023 | |
| Estoril | (Portugal) Ricardo Soares | Signed by Beijing Guoan | 6 June 2023 | Pre-season | (Portugal) Álvaro Pacheco | 19 June 2023 | |
| Gil Vicente | (Portugal) Daniel Sousa | End of contract | 26 June 2023 | Pre-season | (Portugal) Vítor Campelos | 30 June 2023 | |
| Vitória de Guimarães | (Portugal) Moreno | Resigned | 13 August 2023 | 9th | (Brazil) Paulo Turra | 21 August 2023 | |
| Chaves | (Portugal) José Gomes | Sacked | 19 September 2023 | 18th | (Portugal) Moreno | 21 September 2023 | |
| Estoril | (Portugal) Álvaro Pacheco | Sacked | 24 September 2023 | 17th | (Portugal) Vasco Seabra | 25 September 2023 | |
| Vitória de Guimarães | (Brazil) Paulo Turra | Sacked | 3 October 2023 | 6th | (Portugal) Álvaro Pacheco | 4 October 2023 | |
| Casa Pia | (Portugal) Filipe Martins | Resigned | 12 November 2023 | 15th | (Portugal) Pedro Moreira | 21 November 2023 | |
| Arouca | (Portugal) Daniel Ramos | Sacked | 15 November 2023 | 18th | (Portugal) Daniel Sousa | 15 November 2023 | |
| Boavista | (Portugal) Petit | Resigned | 12 December 2023 | 10th | (Portugal) Ricardo Paiva | 29 December 2023 | |
| Vizela | (Spain) Pablo Villar | Resigned | 18 December 2023 | 17th | (Spain) Rubén de la Barrera | 19 December 2023 | |
| Casa Pia | (Portugal) Pedro Moreira | Sacked | 15 February 2024 | 16th | (Portugal) Gonçalo Santos | 16 February 2024 | |
| Famalicão | (Portugal) João Pedro Sousa | Mutual agreement | 19 March 2024 | 8th | (Portugal) Armando Evangelista | 20 March 2024 | |
| Braga | (Portugal) Artur Jorge | Signed by Botafogo | 3 April 2024 | 4th | (Portugal) Rui Duarte | 3 April 2024 | |
| Boavista | (Portugal) Ricardo Paiva | Resigned | 16 April 2024 | 12th | (Portugal) Jorge Simao | 16 April 2024 | |

== League table ==
| Pos | Team | Pld | W | D | L | GF | GA | GD | Pts | Qualification or relegation |
|---|---|---|---|---|---|---|---|---|---|---|
| 1 | Sporting CP (C) | 34 | 29 | 3 | 2 | 96 | 29 | +67 | 90 | Qualification for the Champions League league phase (Note: Since Atalanta, the winners of the 2023–24 UEFA Europa League, qualified for the Champions League via league position, Benfica was promoted from the Champions League third qualifying round to the league phase, as the team with the highest coefficient out of all the teams in Champions League qualifying.) |
| 2 | Benfica | 34 | 25 | 5 | 4 | 77 | 28 | +49 | 80 | Qualification for the Champions League league phase |
| 3 | Porto | 34 | 22 | 6 | 6 | 63 | 27 | +36 | 72 | Qualification for the Europa League league phase (Note: Porto qualified for the Europa League league phase by winning the 2023–24 Taça de Portugal.) |
| 4 | Braga | 34 | 21 | 5 | 8 | 71 | 50 | +21 | 68 | Qualification for the Europa League second qualifying round (Note: Since the 2023–24 Taça de Portugal winners, Porto, finished in top three, the spot given to the third-placed team (Europa League second qualifying round) was passed to the fourth-placed team, and the spot given to the fourth-placed team (Conference League second qualifying round) was passed to the fifth-placed team.) |
| 5 | Vitória de Guimarães | 34 | 19 | 6 | 9 | 52 | 38 | +14 | 63 | Qualification for the Conference League second qualifying round |
| 6 | Moreirense | 34 | 16 | 7 | 11 | 36 | 35 | +1 | 55 | |
| 7 | Arouca | 34 | 13 | 7 | 14 | 54 | 50 | +4 | 46 | |
| 8 | Famalicão | 34 | 10 | 12 | 12 | 37 | 41 | −4 | 42 | |
| 9 | Casa Pia | 34 | 10 | 8 | 16 | 38 | 50 | −12 | 38 | |
| 10 | Farense | 34 | 10 | 7 | 17 | 46 | 51 | −5 | 37 (Note: Head-to-head points: Farense 4, Rio Ave 1.) | |
| 11 | Rio Ave | 34 | 6 | 19 | 9 | 38 | 43 | −5 | 37 | |
| 12 | Gil Vicente | 34 | 9 | 9 | 16 | 42 | 52 | −10 | 36 | |
| 13 | Estoril | 34 | 9 | 6 | 19 | 49 | 58 | −9 | 33 (Note: Head-to-head away goals scored: Estoril 1, Estrela da Amadora 0.) | |
| 14 | Estrela da Amadora | 34 | 7 | 12 | 15 | 33 | 53 | −20 | 33 | |
| 15 | Boavista | 34 | 7 | 11 | 16 | 39 | 62 | −23 | 32 (Note: Head-to-head points: Boavista 4, Portimonense 1.) | |
| 16 | Portimonense (R) | 34 | 8 | 8 | 18 | 39 | 72 | −33 | 32 | Qualification for the relegation play-offs |
| 17 | Vizela (R) | 34 | 5 | 11 | 18 | 36 | 66 | −30 | 26 | Relegation to Liga Portugal 2 |
| 18 | Chaves (R) | 34 | 5 | 8 | 21 | 31 | 72 | −41 | 23 | Relegation to Liga Portugal 2 |

Source: Liga Portugal
Rules for classification: 1) Points; 2) Head-to-head points; 3) Head-to-head goal difference; 4) Head-to-head away goals scored; 5) Goal difference; 6) Matches won; 7) Goals scored; 8) Play-off.
(C) Champions; (R) Relegated

== Relegation play-offs ==
The relegation play-offs took place between Portimonense, who finished 16th in the Primeira Liga, and AVS, who finished 3rd in Liga Portugal 2.

All times are WEST (UTC+1).

| Team 1 | Agg. | Team 2 | 1st leg | 2nd leg |
|---|---|---|---|---|
| Portimonense | 2–4 | AVS | 1–2 | 1–2 |

1st leg

25 May 2024
19:45 UTC+1

| Portimonense | 1–2 | AVS |
|---|---|---|
| Teixeira 86' (o.g.) | Report | Correia 19'; Martins 47' |

Estádio Municipal de Portimão, Portimão
Attendance: 3,685
Referee: Luís Godinho

2nd leg

2 June 2024
19:45 UTC+1

| AVS | 2–1 | Portimonense |
|---|---|---|
| Mercado 51'; Martins 89' | Report | Carrillo 90+4' |

Estádio do CD Aves, Vila das Aves
Attendance: 5,064
Referee: João Pinheiro

AVS won 4–2 on aggregate and were promoted to the Primeira Liga, while Portimonense were relegated to Liga Portugal 2.

== Results ==
| Home \ Away | ARO | BEN | BOA | BRA | CAS | CHA | EST | AMA | FAM | FAR | GIL | MOR | PTM | POR | RAV | SPO | VSC | VIZ |
|---|---|---|---|---|---|---|---|---|---|---|---|---|---|---|---|---|---|---|
| Arouca | | 0–3 | 2–1 | 0–1 | 0–1 | 0–2 | 4–3 | 0–0 | 3–2 | 2–1 | 3–0 | 0–1 | 1–1 | 3–2 | 2–2 | 0–3 | 1–3 | 5–0 |
| Benfica | 5–0 | | 2–0 | 3–1 | 1–1 | 1–0 | 3–1 | 2–0 | 3–0 | 1–1 | 3–0 | 3–0 | 4–0 | 1–0 | 4–1 | 2–1 | 4–0 | 6–1 |
| Boavista | 0–4 | 3–2 | | 0–4 | 1–1 | 4–1 | 2–1 | 1–1 | 2–2 | 1–3 | 1–1 | 1–0 | 1–4 | 1–1 | 0–0 | 0–2 | 1–1 | 2–2 |
| Braga | 0–3 | 0–1 | 4–1 | | 4–3 | 1–1 | 3–1 | 3–0 | 1–2 | 2–1 | 2–1 | 1–0 | 6–1 | 0–1 | 2–1 | 1–1 | 1–1 | 2–1 |
| Casa Pia | 1–0 | 0–1 | 0–0 | 1–3 | | 3–1 | 0–0 | 0–1 | 0–2 | 1–3 | 0–0 | 0–1 | 1–0 | 1–2 | 1–1 | 1–2 | 0–0 | 0–1 |
| Chaves | 1–5 | 0–2 | 2–1 | 2–4 | 1–3 | | 2–2 | 2–2 | 0–1 | 1–1 | 4–2 | 1–2 | 2–3 | 0–3 | 0–0 | 0–3 | 1–2 | 2–1 |
| Estoril | 1–2 | 0–1 | 1–2 | 0–1 | 4–0 | 4–0 | | 1–0 | 1–0 | 4–0 | 1–3 | 1–3 | 1–0 | 1–0 | 2–0 | 0–1 | 1–3 | 2–2 |
| Estrela da Amadora | 1–4 | 1–4 | 3–1 | 2–4 | 3–1 | 1–1 | 2–1 | | 1–0 | 0–3 | 1–0 | 0–1 | 3–0 | 0–1 | 2–2 | 1–2 | 0–1 | 1–1 |
| Famalicão | 1–0 | 2–0 | 1–1 | 1–2 | 1–2 | 2–2 | 1–1 | 0–0 | | 1–0 | 3–1 | 0–0 | 2–2 | 0–3 | 2–1 | 0–1 | 1–3 | 3–2 |
| Farense | 2–0 | 1–3 | 2–0 | 3–1 | 0–3 | 5–0 | 3–2 | 0–0 | 1–1 | | 1–0 | 0–1 | 1–3 | 1–3 | 1–1 | 2–3 | 1–2 | 0–0 |
| Gil Vicente | 2–2 | 2–3 | 1–0 | 3–3 | 2–0 | 0–0 | 5–3 | 1–1 | 1–2 | 2–0 | | 1–1 | 5–0 | 1–1 | 1–1 | 0–4 | 1–0 | 0–1 |
| Moreirense | 1–0 | 0–0 | 1–1 | 2–3 | 1–4 | 1–0 | 2–1 | 2–2 | 1–0 | 1–0 | 0–1 | | 5–2 | 1–2 | 0–0 | 0–2 | 1–0 | 1–0 |
| Portimonense | 1–2 | 1–3 | 1–4 | 3–5 | 2–2 | 2–1 | 1–0 | 1–1 | 1–1 | 1–0 | 0–2 | 0–2 | | 0–3 | 2–2 | 1–2 | 1–1 | 0–0 |
| Porto | 1–1 | 5–0 | 2–1 | 2–0 | 3–1 | 1–0 | 0–1 | 2–0 | 2–2 | 2–1 | 2–1 | 5–0 | 1–0 | | 0–0 | 2–2 | 1–2 | 4–1 |
| Rio Ave | 1–1 | 1–1 | 2–0 | 0–0 | 1–0 | 2–0 | 1–1 | 1–1 | 1–1 | 3–4 | 3–0 | 0–4 | 2–0 | 1–2 | | 3–3 | 2–1 | 1–1 |
| Sporting CP | 2–1 | 2–1 | 6–1 | 5–0 | 8–0 | 3–0 | 5–1 | 3–2 | 1–0 | 3–2 | 3–1 | 3–0 | 3–0 | 2–0 | 2–0 | | 3–0 | 3–2 |
| Vitória de Guimarães | 2–1 | 2–2 | 1–0 | 2–3 | 0–2 | 5–0 | 3–2 | 3–0 | 1–0 | 1–1 | 2–1 | 1–0 | 1–2 | 1–2 | 1–0 | 3–2 | | 2–0 |
| Vizela | 2–2 | 1–2 | 1–4 | 1–3 | 0–4 | 0–1 | 3–3 | 4–0 | 0–0 | 2–1 | 1–0 | 0–0 | 2–3 | 0–2 | 1–1 | 2–5 | 0–1 | |

Source: Liga Portugal
Legend: Blue = home team win; Yellow = draw; Red = away team win.
For upcoming matches, an "a" indicates there is an article about the rivalry between the two participants.

== Statistics ==
=== Top goalscorers ===
| Rank | Player | Club | Goals |
|---|---|---|---|
| 1 | (Sweden) Viktor Gyökeres | Sporting | 29 |
| 2 | (Democratic Republic of the Congo) Simon Banza | Braga | 21 |
| 3 | (Spain) Rafa Mújica | Arouca | 20 |
| 4 | (Venezuela) Jhonder Cádiz | Famalicão | 15 |
| 4 | (Portugal) Paulinho | Sporting | 15 |
| 4 | (Democratic Republic of the Congo) Samuel Essende | Vizela | 15 |
| 4 | (Spain) Cristo González | Arouca | 15 |
| 8 | (Spain) Héctor Hernández | Chaves | 14 |
| 8 | (Portugal) Rafa Silva | Benfica | 14 |
| 10 | (Brazil) Evanilson | Porto | 13 |
| 10 | (Brazil) Bruno Duarte | Farense | 13 |

==== Hat-tricks ====
| Player | For | Against | Result | Date |
|---|---|---|---|---|
| (Spain) Héctor Hernández | Chaves | Gil Vicente | 4–2 (H) | 7 October 2023 |
| (Democratic Republic of the Congo) Simon Banza | Braga | Portimonense | 6–1 (H) | 4 November 2023 |
| (Spain) Rafa Mújica | Arouca | Gil Vicente | 3–0 (H) | 16 December 2023 |
| (Sweden) Viktor Gyökeres | Sporting | Boavista | 6–1 (H) | 17 March 2024 |

Notes

(H) – Home team
(A) – Away team

=== Clean sheets ===
| Rank | Player | Club | Clean sheets |
|---|---|---|---|
| 1 | (Portugal) Diogo Costa | Porto | 14 |
| 2 | (Ukraine) Anatoliy Trubin | Benfica | 13 |
| 2 | (Brazil) Kewin | Moreirense | 13 |
| 4 | (Angola) Ricardo Batista | Casa Pia | 10 |
| 5 | (Spain) Antonio Adán | Sporting | 9 |
| 5 | (Brazil) Jhonatan | Rio Ave | 9 |
| 5 | (Brazil) Andrew | Gil Vicente | 9 |
| 8 | (Cape Verde) Bruno Varela | Vitória de Guimarães | 8 |
| 8 | (Brazil) Marcelo Carné | Estoril | 8 |
| 8 | (Brazil) Luiz Júnior | Famalicão | 8 |

=== Discipline ===
==== Player ====
- Most yellow cards: 13
  - (Brazil) Ângelo Neto (Casa Pia)
- Most red cards: 3
  - (Brazil) Ygor Nogueira (Chaves)

==== Club ====
- Most yellow cards: 99
  - Famalicão
- Most red cards: 9
  - Chaves
  - Famalicão
  - Porto

== Awards ==
=== Monthly awards ===
| Month | Player of the Month | | Goalkeeper of the Month | | Defender of the Month | | Midfielder of the Month | | Forward of the Month | | Manager of the Month | | Goal of the Month | |
| Month | Player | Club | Player | Club | Player | Club | Player | Club | Player | Club | Manager | Club | Player | Club |
|---|---|---|---|---|---|---|---|---|---|---|---|---|---|---|
| August | (Portugal) Paulinho | Sporting | (Cape Verde) Bruno Varela | Vitória de Guimarães | (Spain) Iván Marcano | Porto | (Republic of the Congo) Gaius Makouta | Boavista | (Portugal) Paulinho | Sporting | (Portugal) Petit | Boavista | (Portugal) Tiago Silva | V. Guimarães |
| September | (Sweden) Viktor Gyökeres | Sporting | (Brazil) Luiz Júnior | Famalicão | (Ivory Coast) Ousmane Diomande | Sporting | (Portugal) João Neves | Benfica | (Sweden) Viktor Gyökeres | Sporting | (Portugal) Ruben Amorim | Sporting | (Turkey) Orkun Kökçü | Benfica |
| October/November | (Sweden) Viktor Gyökeres | Sporting | (Brazil) Luiz Júnior | Famalicão | (Portugal) António Silva | Benfica | (Portugal) João Neves | Benfica | (Sweden) Viktor Gyökeres | Sporting | (Portugal) Tiago Aguilar | Moreirense (Note: Aguilar was awarded the prize, due to Rui Borges not having the required coaching level to manage Moreirense) | (Portugal) Rafael Barbosa | Farense |
| December | (Sweden) Viktor Gyökeres | Sporting | (Portugal) Ricardo Velho | Farense | (Portugal) Gonçalo Inácio | Sporting | (Portugal) João Neves | Benfica | (Sweden) Viktor Gyökeres | Sporting | (Portugal) Ruben Amorim | Sporting | (Portugal) Théo Fonseca | Famalicão |
| January | (Sweden) Viktor Gyökeres | Sporting | (Portugal) Diogo Costa | Porto | (Portugal) Gonçalo Inácio | Sporting | (Uruguay) Rodrigo Zalazar | Braga | (Sweden) Viktor Gyökeres | Sporting | (Portugal) Ruben Amorim | Sporting | (Portugal) João Mendes | Vitória de Guimarães |
| February | (Spain) Rafa Mújica | Arouca | (Portugal) Ricardo Velho | Farense | (Portugal) António Silva | Benfica | (Portugal) João Neves | Benfica | (Spain) Rafa Mújica | Arouca | (Portugal) Daniel Sousa | Arouca | (Brazil) Sorriso | Famalicão |
| March | (Portugal) Jota Silva | Vitória de Guimarães | (Brazil) Charles | Vitória de Guimarães | (Portugal) Pepe | Porto | (Portugal) João Neves | Benfica | (Portugal) Jota Silva | Vitória de Guimarães | (Portugal) Ruben Amorim | Sporting | (Brazil) Felippe Cardoso | Casa Pia |
| April | (Sweden) Viktor Gyökeres | Sporting | (Portugal) Ricardo Velho | Farense | (Portugal) Gonçalo Inácio | Sporting | (Portugal) Pedro Gonçalves | Sporting | (Sweden) Viktor Gyökeres | Sporting | (Portugal) Ruben Amorim | Sporting | (Portugal) Tomás Händel | Vitória de Guimarães |

=== Annual awards ===
| Award | Winner | Club |
| Player of the Season | (Sweden) Viktor Gyökeres | Sporting |
| Manager of the Season | (Portugal) Ruben Amorim | Sporting |
| Top scorer | (Sweden) Viktor Gyökeres | Sporting |
| Goal of the Season | (Portugal) João Mendes | Vitória de Guimarães |

Team of the Year

Team of the Year
| Goalkeeper | (Portugal) Ricardo Velho (Farense) | | | | |
| Defence | (Portugal) Costinha (Rio Ave) | (Uruguay) Sebastián Coates (Sporting) | | (Ivory Coast) Ousmane Diomande (Sporting) | (Portugal) Gonçalo Inácio (Sporting) |
| Midfield | (Portugal) Jota Silva (Vitória de Guimarães) | (Portugal) João Neves (Benfica) | (Denmark) Morten Hjulmand (Sporting CP) | (Portugal) Pedro Gonçalves (Sporting CP) | (Spain) Rafa Mújica (Arouca) |
| Attack | (Sweden) Viktor Gyökeres (Sporting CP) | | | | |

== Number of teams by district ==
| Rank | District Football Associations | Number | Teams |
|---|---|---|---|
| 1 | Braga | 6 | Braga, Famalicão, Gil Vicente, Moreirense, Vitória de Guimarães and Vizela |
| 2 | Lisbon | 5 | Benfica, Casa Pia, Estoril, Estrela da Amadora and Sporting CP |
| 3 | Porto | 3 | Boavista, Porto and Rio Ave |
| 4 | Faro | 2 | Farense and Portimonense |
| 5 | Aveiro | 1 | Arouca |
| 5 | Vila Real | 1 | Chaves |

== Attendances ==
SL Benfica drew the highest average home attendance in the 2023-24 edition of the Primeira Liga.

| # | Football club | Home games | Average attendance |
|---|---|---|---|
| 1 | SL Benfica | 17 | 56,248 |
| 2 | Sporting CP | 17 | 40,102 |
| 3 | FC Porto | 17 | 37,911 |
| 4 | Vitória SC | 17 | 17,388 |
| 5 | Sporting Braga | 17 | 15,445 |
| 6 | Boavista | 17 | 10,627 |
| 7 | SC Farense | 17 | 4,999 |
| 8 | Gil Vicente | 17 | 4,970 |
| 9 | Estrela Amadora | 17 | 4,403 |
| 10 | FC Famalicão | 17 | 3,929 |
| 11 | Rio Ave FC | 17 | 3,149 |
| 12 | Estoril Praia | 17 | 3,122 |
| 13 | FC Vizela | 17 | 3,118 |
| 14 | GD Chaves | 17 | 3,070 |
| 15 | Moreirense FC | 17 | 2,705 |
| 16 | Casa Pia AC | 17 | 2,657 |
| 17 | Portimonense SC | 17 | 2,347 |
| 18 | FC Arouca | 17 | 1,945 |
