= Álvaro Pacheco =

Portuguese football manager

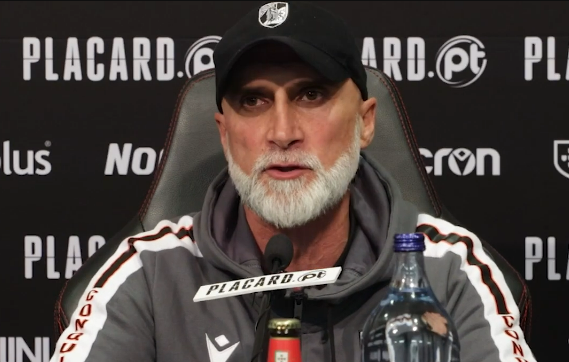
- Pacheco in 2023

Personal information
- Full name: Álvaro Adriano Teixeira Pacheco
- Date of birth: 25 June 1971 (age 55)
- Place of birth: Vila Cova da Lixa, Portugal
- Position: Striker

Youth career
- 1983–1988: Lixa
- 1988–1989: Felgueiras

Senior career*
Years	Team	Apps	(Gls)
1989–1991	Felgueiras	42	(9)
1991–1994	Lixa	25	(8)
1994–1995	Aves	8	(0)
1995–1996	Lixa	21	(5)
1996–1997	Tirsense	28	(4)
1997–1999	Estoril	35	(11)
1999–2000	Lixa	30	(15)
2000–2002	Vilanovense	44	(14)
2002–2003	Dragões Sandinenses	38	(21)
2003–2005	Fafe	53	(8)
2005–2007	Paredes	41	(13)
2007	Amarante	0	(0)

Managerial career
- 2009–2011: Penafiel (youth)
- 2011–2012: Lixa
- 2012–2014: Penafiel (assistant)
- 2014–2016: Moreirense (assistant)
- 2016–2017: Boavista (assistant)
- 2018: Jonava (assistant)
- 2018–2019: Fafe
- 2019–2022: Vizela
- 2023: Estoril
- 2023–2024: Vitória Guimarães
- 2024: Vasco da Gama
- 2024–2025: Al-Orobah
- 2026: Casa Pia
- 2026–: Cape Verde
- * Club domestic league appearances and goals

Álvaro Adriano Teixeira Pacheco (born 25 June 1971) is a Portuguese former footballer and manager.

After achieving a total of 70 games in the second tier as a player, he worked as an assistant manager to Miguel Leal before managing in his own right at Fafe. Hired at Vizela in 2019, he achieved consecutive promotions to the Primeira Liga in his first two seasons, and also led Estoril and Vitória de Guimarães in the top flight.

== Playing career ==
Born in Vila Cova da Lixa, Felgueiras, Pacheco is a product of the football academies of his local clubs Lixa and Felgueiras, while working as a locksmith with his father as a teenager. He started playing professional football with Felgueiras, having played 70 games in the second tier, and had spent most of his career in semi-pro leagues in Portugal. His first job as a manager was in 2005 with the youth ranks of his club Paredes, and he retired from playing in 2007, at the age of 34.

== Coaching career ==
=== Early years ===
Pacheco began his senior coaching career with Lixa in 2011. Afterwards, he was the assistant manager for Miguel Leal at Penafiel, Moreirense and Boavista, and with Filipe Ribeiro at Jonava in Lithuania.

On 24 September 2018, Pacheco returned to work as a head coach at Fafe, ranked 7th in the third tier. In his one season there, he took the team to the playoffs, where they were eliminated by Praiense in the quarter-finals.

=== Vizela ===
In June 2019, Pacheco signed for Vizela, another team eliminated from the same stage of the play-offs. His first season was aborted because of the COVID-19 pandemic, and the Portuguese Football Federation promoted leaders Vizela and Arouca to the second tier.

On his debut as a professional manager on 12 September 2020, Pacheco won 2–1 at home to Oliveirense. His team sealed a second successive promotion the following 22 May, beating Arouca to second place with a 5–2 home win over Vilafranquense on the final day; Vizela's only previous season in the Primeira Liga was 1984–85. In July 2021, he was named Manager of the Year at the LPFP Awards and signed a contract for two more years.

In his first top-flight game on 6 August 2021, Pacheco's Vizela lost 3–0 at reigning champions Sporting CP. On 23 December, his side won 1–0 at home in the fifth round of the Taça de Portugal against district neighbours and cup holders Braga. The team were eliminated 3–1 at home by Porto in the quarter-finals on 12 January 2022.

On 30 November 2022, with Vizela in a safe 13th place and the season paused due to the 2022 FIFA World Cup, Pacheco was nonetheless dismissed and replaced by under-23 manager Tulipa. Days later, he was honoured by Vizela City Hall, and said that he wanted to return to the club.

=== Estoril ===
On 19 June 2023, Pacheco was hired for one year at fellow top-flight team Estoril, where he had played nearly a quarter of a century earlier. On 24 September, after six Primeira Liga matches, Estoril, sitting in penultimate place in the league table with four points, announced that Pacheco and his coaching staff had been relieved of their duties.

=== Vitória Guimarães ===
On 4 October 2023, Pacheco was appointed manager of Primeira Liga side Vitória Guimarães, signing a two-year contract with the Guimarães-based side. The third manager of the season after Moreno and Paulo Turra, he led the club to seven wins in his first ten matches, also reaching a five-match unbeaten streak.

In April 2024, Pacheco travelled to Brazil to hold talks with Cuiabá, who eventually hired compatriot Petit. Vitória president António Miguel Cardoso was angered by the trip and dismissed Pacheco on 15 May 2024, having already qualified the club to the 2024–25 UEFA Conference League. Cardoso said that could not be "held hostage" by a manager who wanted to leave; Pacheco sued him for defamation.

=== Vasco da Gama ===
Days after leaving Vitória, Pacheco signed for Vasco da Gama of the Campeonato Brasileiro Série A. He cited the club's Portuguese origins and history of fighting discrimination as reasons for the move. He only lasted four matches at the club before being sacked on 20 June 2024.

=== Al-Orobah ===
On 21 July 2024, Pacheco was appointed manager of Saudi Pro League side Al-Orobah. On 2 January 2025, Pacheco resigned from his post as manager.

=== Casa Pia ===
On 8 January 2026, Pacheco returned to Portugal, taking charge of Casa Pia, who sat 15th in the Primeira Liga table.

== Managerial statistics ==
As of match played 6 December 2024

Managerial record by team and tenure
Team	Nat	From	To	Record							
Team	Nat	From	To	G	W	D	L	GF	GA	GD	Win %
Lixa	(Portugal)	1 July 2011	12 March 2012	25	14	3	8	46	29	+17	56.00
Fafe	(Portugal)	17 September 2018	4 June 2019	33	21	8	4	58	22	+36	63.64
Vizela	(Portugal)	4 June 2019	30 November 2022	120	55	32	33	199	143	+56	45.83
Estoril	(Portugal)	19 June 2023	24 September 2023	8	3	1	4	19	16	+3	37.50
Vitória Guimarães	(Portugal)	4 October 2023	15 May 2024	33	19	5	9	55	36	+19	57.58
Vasco da Gama	(Brazil)	21 May 2024	20 June 2024	4	0	1	3	1	10	−9	0.00
Al-Orobah	(Saudi Arabia)	21 July 2024	2 January 2025	14	4	1	9	12	29	−17	28.57
Total				237	116	51	70	390	285	+105	48.95

== Honours ==
- Liga Portugal 2 Coach of the Season: 2020-21
