= Armando Evangelista =

Portuguese football manager (born 1973)

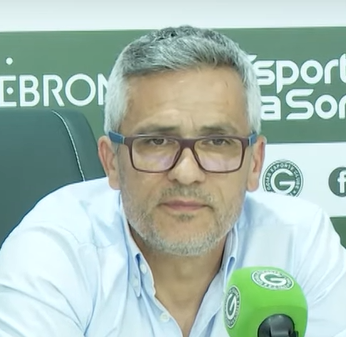
- Evangelista in 2023

Personal information
- Full name: Armando Evangelista Macedo Freitas
- Date of birth: 3 November 1973 (age 52)
- Place of birth: Guimarães, Portugal
- Height: 1.80 m (5 ft 11 in)
- Position: Defensive midfielder

Youth career
- 1987–1992: Vitória Guimarães

Senior career*
Years	Team	Apps	(Gls)
1992–1994	Régua		
1994–1996	Joane		
1996–1999	Naval		
1999–2000	Fafe	24	(0)
2000–2001	Espinho	27	(1)
2001–2003	Moreirense	34	(0)
2003–2004	Lixa	27	(1)
2004–2007	Joane	–	(–)

Managerial career
- 2010–2012: Vitória Guimarães U19
- 2012–2013: Vizela
- 2013–2015: Vitória Guimarães B
- 2015: Vitória Guimarães
- 2016: Varzim
- 2017–2019: Penafiel
- 2020: Vilafranquense
- 2020–2023: Arouca
- 2023: Goiás
- 2024: Famalicão
- 2025-2026: Damac
- * Club domestic league appearances and goals

Armando Evangelista Macedo Freitas (born 3 November 1973) is a Portuguese football manager and former player who played as a defensive midfielder.

== Career ==
=== Vitória Guimarães ===
In the summer of 2010, three seasons after finishing his professional career as a player, Evangelista embarked on his managerial career by taking charge of Vitória Guimarães's under-19 team. After two seasons there, he departed to take charge of Vizela in the third tier.

Evangelista's stay with Vizela was short-lived, and in April 2013 he returned to Vitória to manage its reserve side in Segunda Liga until the end of the season. Despite claiming 9 points from a possible 21, he was unable to prevent relegation to the third tier.

However, Evangelista's stay was prolonged and in 2013–14 season he led the Conquistadores to a first-place finish, and thus promotion back to the second tier. The following season, he took them to 9th. He was subsequently named manager of the first team in June 2015 after Rui Vitória's departure from the club.

After just five league matches – a win and a loss each – and elimination from the UEFA Europa League qualifiers by Austria's Rheindorf Altach, Evangelista was dismissed on 21 September.

=== Three clubs in four years ===
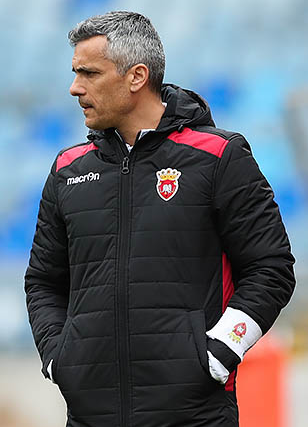
Evangelista with Penafiel in 2018

In May 2016, Evangelista succeeded Nuno Capucho at Varzim in the second tier. He left on 13 October, with the team in 12th.

In September 2017, Evangelista returned to the same league at 15th-placed Penafiel for the rest of the season. He then signed on for the following campaign, in which he took the team to 8th then left to be replaced by Miguel Leal.

Evangelista returned to work on 5 February 2020, at Vilafranquense, presiding over only four games as the season was curtailed due to the COVID-19 pandemic and then turning down a new deal.

=== Arouca ===
On 15 May 2020, Evangelista moved to second-tier newcomers Arouca. In his first season, Arouca came third and then defeated Rio Ave in the play-offs to reach the Primeira Liga for the first time since 2017. After a win over Moreirense, the team made the Taça da Liga semi-finals for the first time the 2022–23 season, where they lost 2–1 to Sporting CP. The league season ended with a club joint-best fifth place, qualifying for the UEFA Europa Conference League. Evangelista then turned down a contract renewal and left the club.

=== Goiás ===
On 9 June 2023, it was reported that Evangelista accepted an offer from Campeonato Brasileiro Série A side Goiás to become their new head coach. On 14 November, he was dismissed with the club in the relegation zone.

=== Famalicão ===
On 20 March 2024, Evangelista returned to Portugal as he was named manager of top tier side Famalicão on a deal until the end of the campaign, replacing João Pedro Sousa who had left by mutual consent a day earlier.

== Managerial statistics ==
As of 6 February 2026

Team	Nat	From	To	Record							
Team	Nat	From	To	G	W	D	L	GF	GA	GD	Win %
Vizela	(Portugal)	1 July 2012	8 April 2013	29	13	9	7	38	31	+7	44.83
Vitória Guimarães B	(Portugal)	11 April 2013	15 June 2015	88	42	18	28	147	102	+45	47.73
Vitória Guimarães	(Portugal)	15 June 2015	21 September 2015	7	1	3	3	6	12	−6	14.29
Varzim	(Portugal)	25 May 2016	13 October 2016	13	4	4	5	14	15	−1	30.77
Penafiel	(Portugal)	28 September 2017	4 June 2019	69	29	17	23	101	85	+16	42.03
Vilafranquense	(Portugal)	5 February 2020	13 May 2020	5	2	0	3	5	12	−7	40.00
Arouca	(Portugal)	15 May 2020	29 May 2023	118	50	31	37	141	129	+12	42.37
Goiás	(Brazil)	12 June 2023	14 November 2023	27	7	9	11	27	37	−10	25.93
Famalicão	(Portugal)	20 March 2024	2 December 2024	23	9	7	7	28	23	+5	39.13
Damac	(Saudi Arabia)	1 July 2025	10 February 2026	21	1	9	11	15	37	−22	4.76
Total				400	158	107	135	522	483	+39	39.50

== Honours ==
=== Player ===
Moreirense

- Segunda Liga: 2001–02

=== Manager ===
Individual

- Primeira Liga Manager of the Month: March 2023
