= Ricardo Soares =

Portuguese football manager and former player (born 1974)

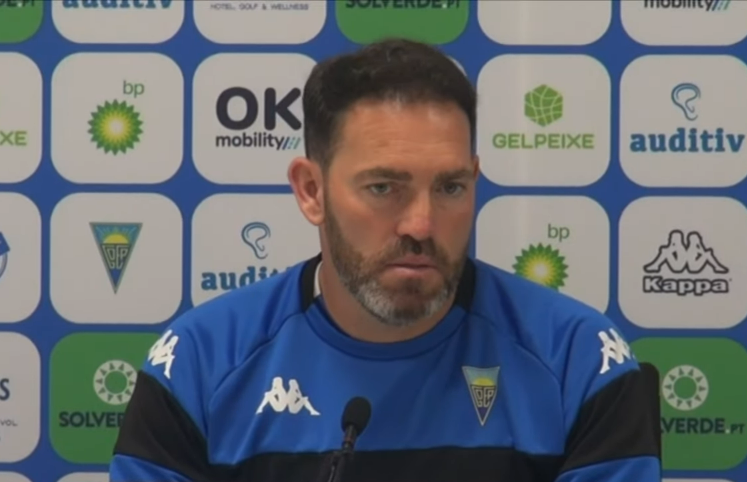
- Soares in 2023

Personal information
- Full name: José Ricardo Soares Ribeiro
- Date of birth: 11 November 1974 (age 52)
- Place of birth: Felgueiras, Portugal
- Position: Winger

Youth career
- 1989–1990: Felgueiras
- 1990–1993: Vitória Guimarães

Senior career*
Years	Team	Apps	(Gls)
1993–1994	Vizela	8	(2)
1994–1995	Lixa	22	(0)
1995–1996	Freamunde	20	(3)
1996–1997	Lousada	20	(0)
1997–1998	Lixa	27	(4)
1998	Felgueiras	1	(0)
1998–1999	Fafe	26	(6)
1999	Felgueiras	3	(0)
1999–2000	Trofense	24	(4)
2000–2001	Vizela	30	(3)
2001–2003	Paredes	55	(6)
2003–2004	Felgueiras	3	(0)
2004–2005	Sandinenses		
Total		239	(28)

Managerial career
- 2005–2007: Caçadores Taipas
- 2007: Torcatense
- 2009–2011: Lixa
- 2011–2012: Académico Felgueiras
- 2012–2013: Felgueiras 1932
- 2013: Ribeirão
- 2014–2015: Felgueiras 1932
- 2015–2016: Vizela
- 2016–2017: Chaves
- 2017: Aves
- 2017–2018: Académica
- 2019: Covilhã
- 2019–2020: Moreirense
- 2020–2022: Gil Vicente
- 2022: Al Ahly
- 2023: Estoril
- 2023–2024: Beijing Guoan
- 2025: Changchun Yatai
- 2026: Wuhan Three Towns
- * Club domestic league appearances and goals

José Ricardo Soares Ribeiro (born 11 November 1974), known as Soares, is a Portuguese former footballer who played as a winger.

After a playing career spent almost entirely at the amateur level, he began managing in 2005, and took Vizela to the second tier eleven years later. He led Chaves, Aves, Moreirense, Gil Vicente and Estoril in the Primeira Liga, had a brief spell at Al Ahly in Egypt and spent one year in the Chinese Super League with Beijing Guoan.

== Playing career ==
Born in Felgueiras, Soares' professional input as a player consisted of seven Segunda Liga games for his hometown club F.C. Felgueiras, over three seasons in as many spells. He amassed third division totals of 232 matches and 28 goals during his 12-year senior career, representing seven teams in the competition.

== Coaching career ==
=== Early years, Vizela and Chaves ===
Soares started working as a manager in 2005 at the age of 30, with amateur side Clube Caçadores das Taipas. Having signed with F.C. Vizela in the summer of 2014, he achieved promotion to the second level at the end of the 2015–16 campaign.

On 18 December 2016, Soares was appointed at Primeira Liga club G.D. Chaves, replacing S.C. Braga-bound Jorge Simão. His first game took place four days later, a 1–0 home win against G.D. Estoril Praia.

=== Aves, Académica and Covilhã ===
In May 2017, Soares moved to another top-flight club, C.D. Aves on a two-year deal. He left on 2 October, with the team in last place on six points from eight matches.

Soares returned to the second tier on 14 November 2017, succeeding Ivo Vieira at Académica de Coimbra. He left by mutual accord the following 1 April having won half of his 18 fixtures, and as the side was placed fifth and four points off a promotion place.

After over a year out of the game, Soares was hired by S.C. Covilhã on 20 May 2019, replacing F.C. Paços de Ferreira-bound Filó.

=== Moreirense and Gil Vicente ===
On 18 December 2019, with his Covilhã team ranked seventh, Soares returned to the top flight by succeeding sacked Vítor Campelos at the helm of Moreirense FC. He left the Parque de Jogos Comendador Joaquim de Almeida Freitas in November 2020, feeling he was not able to maximise his players' potential.

Shortly after, Soares was appointed at Gil Vicente F.C. of the same league. In 2021–22, he led the team to fifth place and a European debut in the UEFA Europa Conference League.

=== Al Ahly ===
In June 2022, Soares moved abroad for the first time in his career, paying €250,000 to release himself from his Gil Vicente contract ahead of a two-year deal at Egypt's Al Ahly SC; his new annual salary was €1.5 million. On his debut on 2 July, the team won 2–0 at home to Petrojet SC in the semi-finals of the national cup. His Premier League bow was a goalless draw at El Gouna FC three days later.

In the cup final on 21 July 2022, Soares' side lost 2–1 to local rivals Zamalek SC, led by veteran compatriot Jesualdo Ferreira. He was dismissed on 31 August, having failed to take the league title back from the same adversary; having slipped behind a third Cairo side, Pyramids FC, Al Ahly finished outside the top two for the first time since 1991–92.

=== Estoril ===
Soares returned to Portugal and its main division on 28 February 2023, on a one-and-a-half-year contract at Estoril. He terminated his deal one year early, having concluded the season with the team raised one place to 14th position.

=== Beijing Guoan ===
On 15 June 2023, Soares was appointed as the new head coach of Chinese Super League club Beijing Guoan FC. He left on 10 December 2024, having achieved 30 wins, 11 draws and 13 losses in his 54 games in charge.

=== Changchun Yatai ===
Soares remained in the Chinese top division for the 2025 campaign, with Changchun Yatai FC; he had taken a sabbatical from coaching to recover from a physical problem that greatly limited his mobility. After being relegated as last, he severed his ties by mutual consent.

=== Wuhan Three Towns ===
On 21 May 2026, Soares was named manager of Wuhan Three Towns F.C. after Benjamín Mora's departure. He left on 6 October, with sporting director Deng Zhuoxiang replacing him.

== Managerial statistics ==
As of match played 5 September 2026

Managerial record by team and tenure
Team	Nat.	From	To	Record								Ref.
Team	Nat.	From	To	G	W	D	L	GF	GA	GD	Win %	Ref.
Caçadores Taipas	(Portugal)	25 May 2005	15 January 2007	46	27	10	9	89	38	+51	58.70	
Torcatense	(Portugal)	26 March 2007	22 May 2007	8	2	3	3	11	12	−1	25.00	
Lixa	(Portugal)	9 June 2009	24 May 2011	68	28	16	24	114	94	+20	41.18	
Académico Felgueiras	(Portugal)	24 May 2011	21 May 2012	34	24	6	4	74	26	+48	70.59	
Felgueiras 1932	(Portugal)	22 May 2012	3 June 2013	34	23	6	5	61	26	+35	67.65	
Ribeirão	(Portugal)	27 August 2013	14 October 2013	7	3	3	1	20	10	+10	42.86	
Felgueiras 1932	(Portugal)	1 July 2014	6 January 2015	19	10	5	4	31	24	+7	52.63	
Vizela	(Portugal)	7 January 2015	18 December 2016	74	35	28	11	94	60	+34	47.30	
Chaves	(Portugal)	18 December 2016	27 May 2017	23	6	7	10	25	32	−7	26.09	
Aves	(Portugal)	27 May 2017	2 October 2017	9	1	3	5	7	13	−6	11.11	
Académica	(Portugal)	14 November 2017	1 April 2018	20	10	4	6	37	25	+12	50.00	
Covilhã	(Portugal)	20 May 2019	18 December 2019	18	8	4	6	27	21	+6	44.44	
Moreirense	(Portugal)	18 December 2019	9 November 2020	26	8	10	8	29	31	−2	30.77	
Gil Vicente	(Portugal)	13 November 2020	28 June 2022	69	28	16	25	95	87	+8	40.58	
Al Ahly	(Egypt)	30 June 2022	31 August 2022	17	9	5	3	22	5	+17	52.94	
Estoril	(Portugal)	28 February 2023	8 June 2023	12	4	1	7	14	18	−4	33.33	
Beijing Guoan	(China)	15 June 2023	10 December 2024	54	30	11	13	115	63	+52	55.56	
Changchun Yatai	(China)	7 May 2025	31 December 2025	20	3	6	11	17	31	−14	15.00	
Wuhan Three Towns	(China)	22 May 2026	6 October 2026	13	3	7	3	21	17	+4	23.08	
Career Total				571	262	151	158	903	633	+270	45.88	
