= Rui Duarte (footballer, born 1978) =

Portuguese footballer

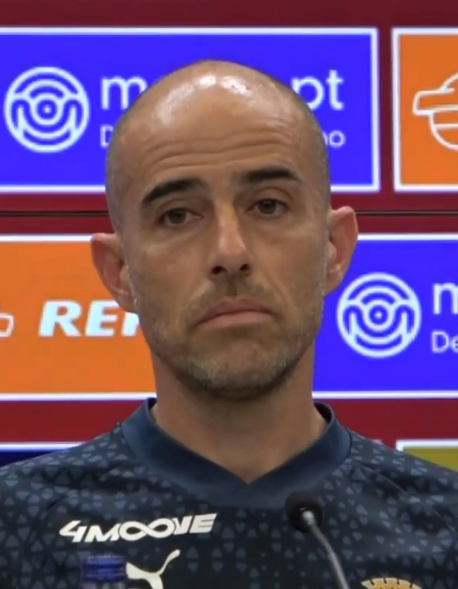
- Duarte with Braga in 2024

Personal information
- Full name: Rui Pedro Viegas Silva Gomes Duarte
- Date of birth: 16 September 1978 (age 48)
- Place of birth: Lisbon, Portugal
- Height: 1.73 m (5 ft 8 in)
- Position: Midfielder

Team information
- Current team: Oțelul Galați (manager)

Youth career
- 1989–1997: Belenenses

Senior career*
Years	Team	Apps	(Gls)
1997–1998	Olhanense	28	(2)
1998–1999	Dragões Sandinenses	23	(2)
1999–2003	Belenenses	30	(2)
2003–2004	Naval	31	(4)
2004–2005	Leixões	31	(5)
2005–2007	Estrela Amadora	22	(2)
2006–2007	→ Olhanense (loan)	24	(6)
2007–2014	Olhanense	169	(18)
2015	Farense	19	(1)
Total		377	(42)

Managerial career
- 2015–2017: Farense (assistant)
- 2017–2019: Farense
- 2019: Casa Pia
- 2020–2021: Trofense
- 2022–2024: Braga U23
- 2024: Braga (caretaker)
- 2024–2025: Marítimo
- 2025–2026: Athletic-MG
- 2026–: Oțelul Galați
- * Club domestic league appearances and goals

Rui Pedro Viegas Silva Gomes Duarte (born 16 September 1978) is a Portuguese former professional footballer who played as a central midfielder. He is currently manager of Liga I club Oțelul Galați.

He amassed Primeira Liga totals of 162 matches and 12 goals over ten seasons, representing Belenenses, Estrela da Amadora and Olhanense in the competition. He added 164 games and 26 goals in the Segunda Liga for four clubs.

In 2017, Duarte began working as a coach, leading Farense and Trofense to promotion from the third tier.

== Playing career ==
Born in Lisbon, Duarte joined the youth ranks of local C.F. Os Belenenses as an 11-year-old, making his Primeira Liga debut for the club in the 1999–2000 season (seven matches, one goal). He took his game to the Segunda Liga in 2003, representing in quick succession Associação Naval 1º de Maio and Leixões SC.

After signing in summer 2006 from C.F. Estrela da Amadora, Duarte went on to spend the better part of his 19-year senior career with S.C. Olhanense, winning the 2008–09 Liga de Honra and remaining with the team in the top division for the following five seasons, with him as captain. He rescinded his contract in November 2014, and moved to their Algarve rivals S.C. Farense for the new year.

== Coaching career ==
After retiring in 2015 at the age of 37, Duarte worked as an assistant to Lázaro Oliveira at Farense, and took the helm on the latter's dismissal on 2 April 2017. In his first full season in charge of the side from Faro he won promotion from the third division with a penalty shootout victory against U.D. Vilafranquense in the semi-finals, but lost the championship game 2–1 to C.D. Mafra on 10 June 2018.

On 4 February 2019, Duarte resigned from Farense, who were tenth in second tier after a five-game winless run that left them that many points outside the relegation zone. He returned to the same league on 4 October at second-from-bottom Casa Pia A.C. after the sacking of Luís Loureiro but, on 17 December, he quit having won once in nine fixtures and the team's ranking unaltered.

Duarte signed for C.D. Trofense on 27 December 2020, after the resignation of António Barbosa. On 6 June the following year, his team were crowned champions of division three via an extra-time goal by Keffel against Estrela. His resignation was accepted on 19 November, with the team 14th in the second tier.

Duarte was appointed manager of S.C. Braga's under-23 side in June 2022. On 3 April 2024, he was promoted to the first team following Artur Jorge's departure to Botafogo FR and until the arrival of Daniel Sousa at the start of the following campaign. His debut three days later was a 3–0 loss at home to F.C. Arouca, the team led precisely by Sousa.

On 20 October 2024, Duarte became C.S. Marítimo's third coach of the second-division season after Fábio Pereira and Silas. He was dismissed the following 6 January, having overseen six losses in nine matches.

Duarte moved abroad for the first time in his career on 4 June 2025, taking over Campeonato Brasileiro Série B club Athletic Club (MG). On 17 February 2026, after suffering relegation in the Campeonato Mineiro, he left by mutual consent.

On 28 September 2026, Duarte signed with Liga I's ASC Oțelul Galați until June 2027.

== Managerial statistics ==
As of match played 21 November 2026

Managerial record by team and tenure
Team	Nat	From	To	Record								Ref
Team	Nat	From	To	G	W	D	L	GF	GA	GD	Win %	Ref
Farense	(Portugal)	3 April 2017	4 February 2019	70	43	13	14	129	56	+73	61.43	
Casa Pia	(Portugal)	25 September 2019	17 December 2019	10	1	0	9	7	20	−13	10.00	
Trofense	(Portugal)	27 December 2020	19 November 2021	32	13	10	9	30	24	+6	40.63	
Braga	(Portugal)	3 April 2024	30 June 2024	7	4	0	3	11	13	−2	57.14	
Marítimo	(Portugal)	20 October 2024	6 January 2025	9	2	1	6	12	17	−5	22.22	
Athletic-MG	(Brazil)	4 June 2025	17 February 2026	34	10	12	12	40	46	−6	29.41	
Oțelul Galați	(Romania)	27 September 2026	present	6	0	3	3	8	11	−3	0.00	
Total				168	73	39	56	237	187	+50	43.45	—

== Honours ==
=== Player ===
Olhanense

- Liga de Honra: 2008–09

=== Coach ===
Trofense

- Campeonato de Portugal: 2020–21
