= Paulo Sérgio (footballer, born 1968) =

Portuguese football manager (born 1968)

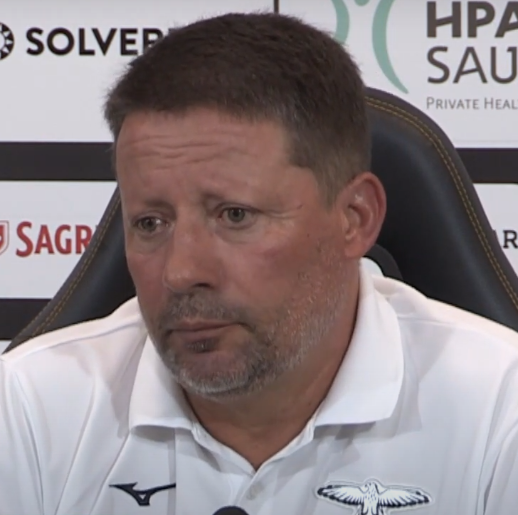
- Paulo Sérgio in 2023

Personal information
- Full name: Paulo Sérgio Bento Brito
- Date of birth: 19 February 1968 (age 58)
- Place of birth: Estremoz, Portugal
- Height: 1.86 m (6 ft 1 in)
- Position: Forward

Youth career
- 1980–1982: Sanjoanense Lisboa
- 1982–1984: Petrogal
- 1984–1986: Olivais Moscavide

Senior career*
Years	Team	Apps	(Gls)
1986–1987	Olivais Moscavide		
1987–1988	Vilafranquense	36	(13)
1988–1993	Belenenses	66	(15)
1993–1994	Paços Ferreira	26	(5)
1994–1995	Salgueiros	8	(2)
1995–1997	Vitória Setúbal	28	(7)
1997	Feirense	6	(0)
1998	Santa Clara	16	(3)
1998–1999	Grenoble	32	(16)
1999–2001	Estoril	66	(32)
2002–2003	Olhanense	47	(25)
Total		331	(118)

Managerial career
- 2003–2006: Olhanense
- 2006–2007: Santa Clara
- 2008: Beira-Mar
- 2008–2009: Paços Ferreira
- 2009–2010: Vitória Guimarães
- 2010–2011: Sporting CP
- 2011–2012: Hearts
- 2012–2013: CFR Cluj
- 2013: APOEL
- 2014–2015: Académica
- 2016: Dibba Al-Fujairah
- 2018–2019: Sanat Naft
- 2019: Al Taawoun
- 2020–2024: Portimonense
- 2025–2026: Al-Okhdood
- * Club domestic league appearances and goals

Paulo Sérgio Bento Brito (born 19 February 1968), known as Paulo Sérgio, is a Portuguese former professional footballer who played as a forward, currently a manager.

He amassed Primeira Liga totals of 86 matches and 18 goals over seven seasons, but played mainly in the lower divisions of Portugal. He also spent a year in the French fourth tier with Grenoble, in a 17-year senior career.

Paulo Sérgio began his career as manager in 2003 and went on to be in charge of several teams, including Vitória de Guimarães, Sporting CP and Hearts. He won the 2011–12 Scottish Cup with the last of those clubs.

== Playing career ==
Born in Estremoz, Alentejo Region, Paulo Sérgio's football career was spent mainly as a substitute, at least in the Primeira Liga. In 17 professional seasons, he represented Olivais e Moscavide, Vilafranquense, Belenenses – his most steady period, helping the Lisbon side finish in second position in the Segunda Liga in 1991–92 with a career-best eight goals, with the consequent promotion – Paços de Ferreira (his best year in the top division came whilst at this club, scoring five times in 26 games in the 1993–94 campaign, even though 14 of those came from the bench, as they were eventually relegated), Salgueiros, Vitória de Setúbal, Feirense, Santa Clara, Estoril and Olhanense.

In 1998–99, Paulo Sérgio had a spell abroad with French team Grenoble, in the Championnat de France Amateur.

== Coaching career ==
=== Portugal ===
Paulo Sérgio took up coaching after retiring in 2003, his first experience being with his last club Olhanense, for three seasons. He next managed another former team, Azores's Santa Clara.

Paulo Sérgio's first spell in the top flight occurred in 2008–09, with yet another side he had represented as a footballer, Paços de Ferreira. However, on 14 October 2009, he left for Vitória de Guimarães to take the place of the sacked Nelo Vingada, signing until summer 2011.

In late April 2010, Paulo Sérgio reached an agreement to succeed Carlos Carvalhal at the helm of Sporting CP, effective as of July. After dispatching Nordsjælland of Denmark in the UEFA Europa League, he made his league debut on 14 August, suffering a 1–0 defeat at Paços.

On 26 February 2011, following a 0–2 home loss against Benfica in the league, and Europa League elimination at the hands of Rangers, with Sporting also out of domestic cup contention and trailing Porto by 23 points in the league, Paulo Sérgio's contract was mutually terminated.

=== Heart of Midlothian ===
Paulo Sérgio was appointed manager of Scottish Premier League club Heart of Midlothian on 2 August 2011, following the removal of his predecessor Jim Jefferies on the previous day. In October, the team withdrew their staff from all media events in protest at him being called in front of the Scottish Football Association following his remarks about referee Iain Brines after a defeat against Ayr United the following month. He was also sent to the stands for dissent during a game against Kilmarnock after Ian Black was sent off and Marius Žaliūkas fouled Paul Heffernan, allowing Dean Shiels to score the game's only goal from the penalty spot.

On 19 May 2012, Paulo Sérgio and Hearts won the Scottish Cup – the eighth overall for the club and the first in six years – after a 5–1 win over fellow Edinburgh side Hibernian. He rejected a new contract offer, and left on 7 June.

=== CFR Cluj ===
On 28 October 2012, Paulo Sérgio was appointed at CFR Cluj in Romania, after the Liga I team failed to reach an agreement with compatriot Sérgio Conceição.

He managed to lead the side to the Europa League knockout phase, but the year 2013 started badly with seven consecutive games without a win; thus, he was sacked on 13 April.

=== APOEL ===
On 20 May 2013, Paulo Sérgio signed a one-year contract with reigning Cypriot champions APOEL. He made his debut against NK Maribor at the GSP Stadium on 31 July in a 1–1 first leg draw in the third qualifying round of the 2013–14 UEFA Champions League, with the tie being lost on the away goals rule. On 17 August he won his first trophy with his new club, after a 1–0 victory over Apollon Limassol in the Super Cup.

On 4 October 2013, APOEL parted company with Paulo Sérgio, who spent less than five months in charge of the team and managed just three wins in 11 matches.

=== Académica ===
On 31 May 2014, Paulo Sérgio signed a one-year deal with Académica de Coimbra. His first official game in charge occurred on 16 August, a 1–1 home draw with Sporting.

Club and Paulo Sérgio agreed to part ways on 15 February 2015, with the team second from bottom having won once in 21 games.

=== Middle East ===
In June 2016, Paulo Sérgio was hired at Dibba Al-Fujairah. He was dismissed on 10 December, after taking five points with no wins in the first 11 UAE Pro-League matches of the season and immediately following an 8–0 loss to Al-Wasl.

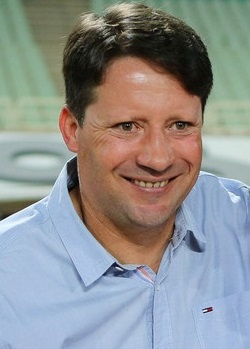
Paulo Sérgio in 2018

Remaining in the Middle East, Paulo Sérgio signed a one-year deal with Sanat Naft in June 2018. He took the team to eighth in the Iran Pro League, and at the end of the campaign was hired by Al Taawoun in Saudi Arabia; he blamed U.S. sanctions against Iran for making his previous job difficult.

Paulo Sérgio left the club shortly before the end of 2019, with the team in sixth place – the holders had also been eliminated from the last 16 of the Kings Cup by Abha Club.

=== Portimonense ===
In February 2020, Paulo Sérgio became the second manager of second-from-bottom Portimonense in the Portuguese top-tier campaign. Though he improved their performance, earning himself the Manager of the Month award for June, the Algarve team were relegated on the final day; he voted to stay with them even before they were restored to the league as a result of Vitória de Setúbal's irregularities.

After finishing in 14th and 13th place, Paulo Sérgio signed a new contract in May 2022, tying him to Portimonense until 2024 in the aim of qualifying for European competition. On 3 June 2024, however, following their relegation in the playoffs with a 4–2 aggregate loss to newly formed AVS, he resigned.

=== Al-Okhdood ===
Paulo Sérgio returned to Saudi Arabia on 2 March 2025, being appointed head coach of Al-Okhdood on a deal until the end of the top-division season. He managed to avoid relegation by one point, but was dismissed on 5 January 2026 with the side again in the drop zone.

== Managerial statistics ==
As of 2 January 2026

Team	Nat	From	To	Record					
Team	Nat	From	To	G	W	D	L	Win %	Ref
Olhanense	(Portugal)	1 July 2003	17 May 2006	111	52	32	27	46.85	
Santa Clara	(Portugal)	17 May 2006	31 December 2007	50	24	9	17	48.00	
Beira-Mar	(Portugal)	8 February 2008	15 May 2008	12	5	3	4	41.67	
Paços de Ferreira	(Portugal)	22 May 2008	14 October 2009	55	18	15	22	32.73	
Vitória de Guimarães	(Portugal)	15 October 2009	13 May 2010	30	13	7	10	43.33	
Sporting CP	(Portugal)	14 May 2010	26 February 2011	38	20	8	10	52.63	
Hearts	(Scotland)	2 August 2011	7 June 2012	47	21	10	16	44.68	
CFR Cluj	(Romania)	28 October 2012	13 April 2013	19	7	5	7	36.84	
APOEL	(Cyprus)	20 May 2013	4 October 2013	11	3	5	3	27.27	
Académica	(Portugal)	31 May 2014	15 February 2015	26	3	12	11	11.54	
Dibba Al-Fujairah	(United Arab Emirates)	1 July 2016	11 December 2016	16	2	6	8	12.50	
Sanat Naft	(Iran)	1 July 2018	22 May 2019	33	8	17	8	24.24	
Al Taawoun	(Saudi Arabia)	22 May 2019	29 December 2019	16	9	1	6	56.25	
Portimonense	(Portugal)	10 February 2020	3 June 2024	167	47	35	85	28.14	
Al-Okhdood	(Saudi Arabia)	2 March 2025	Present	25	7	4	14	28.00	
Total				656	239	169	248	36.43	

== Honours ==
=== Player ===
Belenenses

- Taça de Portugal: 1988–89

Santa Clara

- Segunda Divisão: 1997–98 (South)

Grenoble

- Championnat de France Amateur: 1998–99 (Group B)

=== Manager ===
Olhanense

- Segunda Divisão: 2003–04 (South)

Heart of Midlothian

- Scottish Cup: 2011–12

APOEL

- Cypriot Super Cup: 2013
