= José Gomes (football manager) =

Portuguese football manager (born 1970)

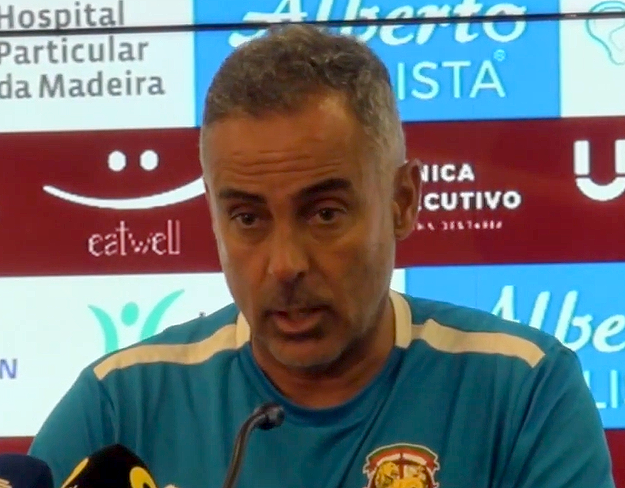
- Gomes with Marítimo in 2023

Personal information
- Full name: José Manuel Martins Teixeira Gomes
- Date of birth: 28 August 1970 (age 56)
- Place of birth: Matosinhos, Portugal

Team information
- Current team: Al-Khaleej (manager)

Managerial career
- Years: Team
- 1995–1996: Paços Ferreira (assistant)
- 1997–1998: Covilhã (assistant)
- 2003: Paços Ferreira
- 2003–2004: Aves
- 2004–2005: Leixões
- 2005: União Leiria
- 2006: Moreirense
- 2007: Aves
- 2008–2010: Porto (assistant)
- 2010: Málaga (assistant)
- 2010–2012: Panathinaikos (assistant)
- 2013–2014: Videoton
- 2014–2016: Al Taawoun
- 2016: Al-Ahli
- 2016–2017: Baniyas
- 2017–2018: Al Taawoun
- 2018: Rio Ave
- 2018–2019: Reading
- 2019–2020: Marítimo
- 2020–2021: Almería
- 2021–2022: Al Taawoun
- 2022: Ponferradina
- 2022–2023: Marítimo
- 2023: Chaves
- 2024: Zamalek
- 2024–2026: Al Fateh
- 2026–: Al-Khaleej

José Manuel Martins Teixeira Gomes (born 28 August 1970) is a Portuguese professional football manager, currently in charge of Saudi Pro League club Al-Khaleej.

He managed Paços de Ferreira, União de Leiria, Rio Ave, Marítimo and Chaves in the Primeira Liga, while also working in Hungary, Saudi Arabia, the United Arab Emirates, England, Spain and Egypt.

== Career ==
=== Beginnings ===
Born in Matosinhos, Gomes started coaching in his early 20s, beginning with the youth teams of Clube Futebol de Valadares. He also worked as an assistant at F.C. Paços de Ferreira and S.C. Covilhã.

From 1998 to 2003, Gomes worked as a fitness coach with Gil Vicente FC, Paços and S.L. Benfica. He started 2003–04 as manager of Paços in the Primeira Liga, and was fired after seven losses in the first eight games; the club's season eventually ended in relegation.

Gomes spent most of the following years in the Segunda Liga. In 2005–06 he had his second spell in Portugal's top division, drawing two matches and losing five at U.D. Leiria.

In late May 2008, Gomes was hired by FC Porto as part of Jesualdo Ferreira's staff. He spent four seasons as Ferreira's assistant at Porto, Málaga CF and Panathinaikos FC.

=== Videoton ===
On 20 January 2013, Videoton FC appointed Gomes as their new manager; he replaced his compatriot Paulo Sousa at the helm of the Hungarian side. He led the team to fourth place in Nemzeti Bajnokság I in his only full season, also losing the final of the Ligakupa to Diósgyőri VTK (2–1).

=== Arabia ===
Gomes then spent two seasons as head coach of Al Taawoun FC in the Saudi Professional League. On 30 May 2016 he joined Al-Ahli Saudi FC in the same league, signing a three-year deal after Christian Gross did not renew his contract. In early October, however, he was sacked and replaced by Gross.

Days later, Gomes succeeded Pablo Repetto at UAE Pro League's Baniyas Club who were struggling at the start of the campaign. He was fired on 28 January 2017 with the team still in last place, having taken four points from 12 games.

Gomes returned to Al Taawoun on 20 March 2017, following the dismissal of Constantin Gâlcă. He was succeeded by countryman Pedro Emanuel on 7 May the following year.

=== Rio Ave ===
On 13 June 2018, Gomes returned to his country's top flight after over a decade away, signing for one season at Rio Ave FC. His debut on 26 July was a 1–0 defeat away to Jagiellonia Białystok in the second qualifying round of the UEFA Europa League, being eliminated after a 4–4 draw in the return game at the Estádio dos Arcos.

=== Reading ===
Gomes was appointed coach of EFL Championship club Reading on 22 December 2018, replacing caretaker Scott Marshall. With only two home defeats in the second half of the season, his side avoided relegation.

Gomes promoted Michael Olise from the youth academy, giving him his professional debut in March 2019. On 9 October, after just two league wins from 11 matches in the new campaign, he left.

=== Marítimo ===
On 14 November 2019, Gomes was named manager of C.S. Marítimo. In his only season in charge, he led the team to the 11th position in the Portuguese top tier.

=== Almería ===
On 27 July 2020, Gomes took over for fellow Portuguese Mário Silva at the helm of Spanish Segunda División side UD Almería, shortly before the promotion play-offs began. They were eliminated 3–1 on aggregate by Girona FC.

Gomes was dismissed by owner Turki Al-Sheikh on 27 April 2021 even though the team stood third in the table after achieving several away wins in a row during the season, in which he rarely fielded the same starting XI. He received a standing ovation from his players in the dressing room after delivering his farewell speech.

=== Return to Al Taawoun ===
On 22 August 2021, Gomes was appointed at Al Taawoun for the third time, taking over from the fired Nestor El Maestro. He left the club by mutual consent on 20 March 2022.

=== Ponferradina and Marítimo return ===
Gomes returned to Spain and its second tier on 13 June 2022, after being named manager of SD Ponferradina. He resigned on 19 November, immediately after a 1–1 home draw with Real Oviedo during a run of one win in ten.

On 14 December 2022, Gomes went back to Marítimo, signing for the second-from-bottom team as their third manager of the season after Vasco Seabra and João Henriques. The Madeira side were eventually relegated via the play-offs, falling to the second division for the first time in 38 years after a penalty shootout defeat to C.F. Estrela da Amadora.

=== Chaves ===
Gomes remained in the top flight in 2023–24, on a contract at G.D. Chaves. On 19 September, after five league losses in as many games and 17 goals conceded, he was dismissed.

=== Zamalek ===
In February 2024, Gomes was appointed head coach of Zamalek SC in the Egyptian Premier League until July 2025. Three months later, he guided the team to their second title in the CAF Confederation Cup by winning against RS Berkane in the final on the away goals rule, following a 2–2 aggregate draw. He achieved his second trophy on 27 September, beating rivals Al Ahly SC on penalties to claim the CAF Super Cup.

Gomes announced his departure on 11 December 2024.

=== Al Fateh ===
On 15 December 2024, Gomes returned to the Saudi main division by joining Al Fateh SC on an initial one-year deal. In his second match in charge, his bottom-placed side were trounced 9–0 at leaders Al Hilal SFC, managed by his compatriot Jorge Jesus; it was the heaviest loss of his career. He went on to easily avoid relegation, notably beating eventual champions Al-Ittihad Club 2–0 at home.

=== Al-Khaleej ===
On 28 May 2026, Gomes was appointed at Al-Khaleej FC.

== Managerial statistics ==
As of match played 29 October 2026

Managerial record by team and tenure
Team	Nat	From	To	Record							
Team	Nat	From	To	G	W	D	L	GF	GA	GD	Win %
Paços Ferreira	(Portugal)	30 June 2003	19 October 2003	8	1	0	7	3	17	−14	12.50
Aves	(Portugal)	29 October 2003	20 May 2004	26	10	4	12	26	38	−12	38.46
Leixões	(Portugal)	20 May 2004	25 May 2005	36	15	8	13	46	38	+8	41.67
Leiria	(Portugal)	25 May 2005	26 September 2005	7	0	2	5	1	11	−10	0.00
Moreirense	(Portugal)	2 March 2006	8 May 2006	10	5	1	4	12	7	+5	50.00
Aves	(Portugal)	25 May 2007	4 December 2007	14	3	3	8	18	22	−4	21.43
Videoton	(Hungary)	20 January 2013	2 June 2014	72	41	14	17	141	70	+71	56.94
Al Taawoun	(Saudi Arabia)	4 September 2014	29 May 2016	61	25	16	20	113	88	+25	40.98
Al-Ahli	(Saudi Arabia)	30 May 2016	2 October 2016	6	3	2	1	11	7	+4	50.00
Baniyas	(United Arab Emirates)	22 October 2016	28 January 2017	15	1	3	11	15	44	−29	6.67
Al Taawoun	(Saudi Arabia)	21 March 2017	2 May 2018	38	10	10	18	61	62	−1	26.32
Rio Ave	(Portugal)	13 June 2018	22 December 2018	21	8	5	8	43	37	+6	38.10
Reading	(England)	22 December 2018	9 October 2019	38	9	14	15	39	53	−14	23.68
Marítimo	(Portugal)	14 November 2019	27 July 2020	24	7	8	9	22	25	−3	29.17
Almería	(Spain)	27 July 2020	27 April 2021	43	21	9	13	63	39	+24	48.84
Al Taawoun	(Saudi Arabia)	22 August 2021	20 March 2022	26	6	11	9	40	42	−2	23.08
Ponferradina	(Spain)	13 June 2022	19 November 2022	17	4	5	8	18	24	−6	23.53
Marítimo	(Portugal)	14 December 2022	14 June 2023	23	7	2	14	27	39	−12	30.43
Chaves	(Portugal)	1 July 2023	19 September 2023	6	0	1	5	5	18	−13	0.00
Zamalek	(Egypt)	2 February 2024	11 December 2024	47	25	13	9	76	45	+31	53.19
Al Fateh	(Saudi Arabia)	15 December 2024	28 May 2026	59	22	13	24	82	94	−12	37.29
Al-Khaleej	(Saudi Arabia)	28 May 2026	present	13	3	6	4	14	21	−7	23.08
Total				610	226	150	234	876	841	+35	37.05

== Honours ==
Al Ahli

- Saudi Super Cup: 2016

Zamalek

- CAF Confederation Cup: 2023–24
- CAF Super Cup: 2024
