= Moreno (Portuguese footballer) =

Portuguese footballer

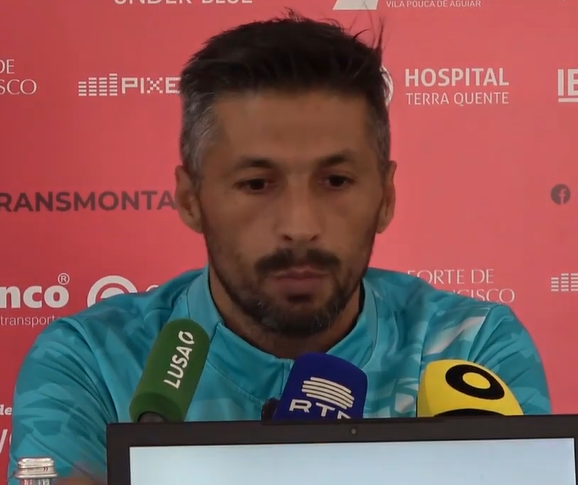
- Moreno in 2023

Personal information
- Full name: João Miguel da Cunha Teixeira
- Date of birth: 19 August 1981 (age 45)
- Place of birth: Urgezes, Portugal
- Height: 1.88 m (6 ft 2 in)
- Position: Defensive midfielder

Youth career
- 1991–2000: Vitória Guimarães
- 1996–1999: → Amigos Urgeses (loan)

Senior career*
Years	Team	Apps	(Gls)
2000–2010	Vitória Guimarães	117	(3)
2000–2001	→ Felgueiras (loan)	0	(0)
2001–2002	→ Macedo Cavaleiros (loan)		
2002–2004	→ Caçadores Taipas (loan)	65	(4)
2010–2012	Leicester City	3	(0)
2012–2013	Nacional	39	(3)
2013–2018	Vitória Guimarães	46	(1)
2013–2016	Vitória Guimarães B	18	(0)
Total		288	(11)

International career
2009	Portugal B	1	(0)

Managerial career
- 2018–2021: Vitória Guimarães (assistant)
- 2021: Vitória Guimarães B
- 2021: Vitória Guimarães
- 2021–2022: Vitória Guimarães B
- 2022–2023: Vitória Guimarães
- 2023–2024: Chaves
- 2026: Felgueiras
- * Club domestic league appearances and goals

João Miguel da Cunha Teixeira (born 19 August 1981), known as Moreno, is a Portuguese former professional footballer who played mainly as a defensive midfielder. He is currently a manager.

He spent most of his career with Vitória de Guimarães, and had a one-and-a-half-year spell in England with Leicester City. Over 12 seasons, he amassed Primeira Liga totals of 185 matches and six goals.

As a manager, Moreno was also mostly associated with Vitória, including two stints in charge of the first team, additionally managing Chaves in the top flight.

== Playing career ==
=== Early years and Vitória ===
Born in the village of Urgezes, Guimarães, Moreno began playing professionally with F.C. Felgueiras – Segunda Liga, not collecting one single league appearance – then moved to the lower leagues with C.A. Macedo de Cavaleiros and Clube Caçadores das Taipas also on loan. In the 2004–05 season, he returned to his parent club Vitória S.C. in the Primeira Liga.

Moreno contributed 14 matches as Vitória moved straight from the second tier into a third place in 2007–08 (although mainly as a substitute). He spent most of the following campaign as a central defender, due to the serious knee condition of teammate Henrique Sereno.

Moreno appeared in 23 games in 2009–10 as the Minho side finished in sixth position, narrowly missing on qualification for the UEFA Europa League.

=== Leicester City ===
On 6 August 2010, Moreno signed a two-year contract with Football League Championship club Leicester City, joining compatriots Miguel Vítor and Paulo Sousa (manager). Four days later he made his debut for his new team, in a 4–3 win over Macclesfield Town in the first round of the League Cup.

In August 2011, after only six competitive appearances in 2010–11, Moreno was told he was free to look for a new club, and was not given a squad number for the upcoming season. His contract was cancelled on 13 January 2012.

=== Nacional ===
Moreno returned to his country in the 2012 winter transfer window, joining C.D. Nacional in Madeira until 30 June 2014. He scored twice from 12 games in his first season, and agreed to cut ties with the club one year before his link expired.

=== Return to Guimarães ===
On 4 July 2013, Moreno returned to Vitória Guimarães on a two-year deal. On 7 June 2017, already a fringe player but considered an "invaluable locker room presence" by coach Pedro Martins, the 35-year-old captain renewed his contract for one season.

== Coaching career ==
=== Vitória ===
Moreno remained connected to Vitória after retiring, first as an assistant then as manager of the reserve team, reaching the latter in April 2021 after Bino was appointed at the main squad. The following month, after Bino's dismissal, he replaced him for the final two matches of the campaign, losing 3–1 at home against S.L. Benfica in the last round and missing out on qualification for the UEFA Europa Conference League after being overtaken by C.D. Santa Clara.

Having spent the 2021–22 season back in charge of the second team in Liga 3, Moreno returned to the main job at the Estádio D. Afonso Henriques on 12 July when Pepa was dismissed days before the new campaign was due to begin. He won three games and drew the other in February 2023, earning the league's Manager of the Month award, though it was given in the name of his assistant João Aroso as he was technically unqualified to work in the top division.

Moreno resigned on 13 August 2023 after opening the new season with a 1–0 win at C.F. Estrela da Amadora, following Conference League elimination on penalties by NK Celje.

=== Chaves ===
On 21 September 2023, Moreno succeeded José Gomes at bottom-placed G.D. Chaves. He debuted three days later by earning their first point in the sixth fixture, 2–2 at home to Estrela via a Pedro Pinho equaliser in the fourth minute of added time.

Moreno left at the end of the the campaign, having failed to avoid top-division relegation as last.

=== Felgueiras ===
On 18 June 2026, following two years of inactivity, Moreno was appointed at the renamed Felgueiras in the Liga Portugal 2. He left on 10 November by mutual agreement.

== Career statistics ==
As of 11 November 2017

Club	Season	League		Cup		League Cup		Europe		Other (Note: Includes Supertaça Cândido de Oliveira)		Total	
Club	Season	Apps	Goals	Apps	Goals	Apps	Goals	Apps	Goals	Apps	Goals	Apps	Goals
Felgueiras	2000–01	0	0	2	0	—		—		—		2	0
Macedo Cavaleiros	2001–02					—		—		—			
Caçadores Taipas	2002–03	37	1			—		—		—		37	3
Caçadores Taipas	2003–04	28	3	1	0	—		—		—		29	3
Caçadores Taipas	Total	65	4	1	0	—		—		—		66	4
Vitória Guimarães	2004–05	16	2	2	1	—		—		—		18	3
Vitória Guimarães	2005–06	22	0	4	1	—		4	0	—		30	1
Vitória Guimarães	2006–07	17	1	1	0	—		—		—		18	1
Vitória Guimarães	2007–08	14	0	3	0	1	0	—		—		18	0
Vitória Guimarães	2008–09	25	0	3	0	4	1	3	0	—		35	1
Vitória Guimarães	2009–10	23	0	3	0	5	2	—		—		31	2
Vitória Guimarães	Total	117	3	16	2	10	3	7	0	—		150	8
Leicester City	2010–11	3	0	0	0	3	0	—		—		6	0
Leicester City	2011–12	0	0	0	0	0	0	—		—		0	0
Leicester City	Total	3	0	0	0	3	0	—		—		6	0
Nacional	2011–12	12	2	1	0	1	1	—		—		14	3
Nacional	2012–13	27	1	1	0	2	0	—		—		30	1
Nacional	Total	39	3	2	0	3	1	—		—		44	4
Vitória Guimarães	2013–14	22	0	2	0	1	0	3	0	1	0	35	0
Vitória Guimarães	2014–15	12	1	0	0	2	0	—		—		14	1
Vitória Guimarães	2015–16	4	0	0	0	0	0	2	0	—		6	0
Vitória Guimarães	2016–17	4	0	3	0	1	0	—		—		6	0
Vitória Guimarães	2017–18	2	0	1	1	1	0	2	0	0	0	6	1
Vitória Guimarães	Total	44	1	6	1	5	0	7	0	1	0	63	2
Vitória Guimarães B	2013–14	6	0	—		—		—		—		6	0
Vitória Guimarães B	2014–15	4	0	—		—		—		—		4	0
Vitória Guimarães B	2015–16	8	0	—		—		—		—		8	0
Vitória Guimarães B	Total	18	0	—		—		—		—		18	0
Career Total		286	11	27	3	21	4	14	0	1	0	348	18

== Managerial statistics ==
As of match played 18 May 2024

Managerial record by team and tenure
Team	Nat	From	To	Record								Ref
Team	Nat	From	To	G	W	D	L	GF	GA	GD	Win %	Ref
Vitória Guimarães B	(Portugal)	6 April 2021	13 May 2021	4	3	1	0	12	5	+7	75.00	
Vitória Guimarães	(Portugal)	13 May 2021	21 May 2021	2	0	1	1	1	3	−2	0.00	
Vitória Guimarães B	(Portugal)	31 May 2021	12 July 2022	28	12	5	11	36	33	+3	42.86	
Vitória Guimarães	(Portugal)	12 July 2022	13 August 2023	47	22	9	16	53	53	+0	46.81	
Chaves	(Portugal)	21 September 2023	20 May 2024	30	5	9	16	27	55	−28	16.67	
Total				111	42	25	44	129	149	−20	37.84	—
