= Ivo Vieira =

Portuguese footballer and manager

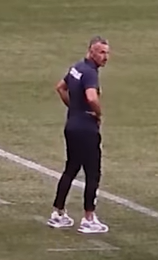
- Vieira in 2023

Personal information
- Full name: Ivo Ricardo Abreu Vieira
- Date of birth: 10 January 1976 (age 50)
- Place of birth: Machico, Portugal
- Height: 1.77 m (5 ft 10 in)
- Position: Defender

Youth career
- 1986–1992: Machico
- 1992–1994: Nacional

Senior career*
Years	Team	Apps	(Gls)
1994–2004	Nacional	206	(3)

Managerial career
- 2004–2008: Nacional (assistant)
- 2008–2010: Nacional (youth)
- 2011: Nacional
- 2013–2014: Marítimo B
- 2014–2015: Marítimo (assistant)
- 2015–2016: Marítimo
- 2016–2017: Aves
- 2017: Académica
- 2017–2018: Estoril
- 2018–2019: Moreirense
- 2019–2020: Vitória Guimarães
- 2020–2021: Al Wehda
- 2021: Famalicão
- 2022: Gil Vicente
- 2023: Cuiabá
- 2023–2024: Pendikspor
- 2025: Marítimo
- 2025: Tondela
- * Club domestic league appearances and goals

Ivo Ricardo Abreu Vieira (born 10 January 1976) is a Portuguese former professional footballer who played as a defender, currently a manager.

He spent his entire playing career with Nacional, where he also began working as a coach in 2011. He managed seven other clubs in the Primeira Liga, and won the Campeonato Mato-Grossense with Cuiabá in 2023.

== Playing career ==
Vieira was born in Machico, Madeira. His entire ten-year professional career was spent with local C.D. Nacional, which he represented in all three major levels since being promoted to the main squad at the age of 18; during his tenure, he also acted as captain.

From 2002 to 2004, Vieira competed in the Primeira Liga. His first game in the competition took place on 22 September 2002, as he came on a last-minute substitute in a 2–0 away win against S.C. Beira-Mar; in the latter season, he contributed 19 appearances to help his team to a best-ever fourth position.

== Coaching career ==
=== Nacional and Marítimo ===
After retiring at the age of only 28, Vieira started working as a coach, first being named assistant manager at Nacional under Casemiro Mior. On 14 March 2011, after a spell with the club's juniors, he was handed the reins of the first team after Predrag Jokanović was fired. However, he himself was replaced by Pedro Caixinha at the end of October.

On 19 January 2013, Vieira was announced as the new manager of C.S. Marítimo B, the reserves of Nacional's local rivals. In early March 2015, following Leonel Pontes' resignation, he was appointed his successor at the helm of the first team, leading the club to the final of the Taça da Liga the following month later after disposing of FC Porto in the last-four stage.

Vieira resigned on 18 January 2016, due to poor results.

=== Five clubs in four years ===
On 27 May 2016, Vieira was appointed at Segunda Liga club C.D. Aves for one year. He left on 15 February 2017, with the team nine points clear in the second promotion place after a run of one point from four games.

Vieira became manager of Académica de Coimbra in May 2017, stating his aim to end their exile from the top flight. He left in November with the side in sixth and took the helm at G.D. Estoril Praia, leaving after their top-division relegation.

On 28 May 2018, Vieira signed a one-year deal at Moreirense FC. He left at the end of this contract, having taken the team from Moreira de Cónegos to a best-ever sixth place, and in June 2019 he was hired by neighbours Vitória SC. After finishing seventh in his only season, he announced a sabbatical to spend time with his family.

=== Famalicão and Gil Vicente ===
Vieira was appointed as the manager of Al Wehda Club in the Saudi Professional League on 10 September 2020. He left by mutual consent the following 2 February, with the side in 10th.

On 8 March 2021, Vieira returned to his country's top flight with F.C. Famalicão. He signed a contract of undisclosed length at the club, who were second-from-bottom with 11 games remaining. His team were in contention for a UEFA Europa Conference League place on the final day of the season, eventually missing out but finishing 9th.

Vieira was dismissed on 19 December 2021, having taken 11 points from 15 games and with Famalicão in 16th. The following 28 June, he replaced Ricardo Soares at Gil Vicente F.C. on a two-year deal. He was removed from his post on 2 November after four consecutive defeats.

=== Cuiabá ===
On 8 December 2022, Vieira replaced his compatriot António Oliveira at the helm of Campeonato Brasileiro Série A side Cuiabá Esporte Clube. He won the Campeonato Mato-Grossense in his first year – his first career trophy – via an unbeaten season that concluded with a 3–0 aggregate win over União Esporte Clube.

On 10 May 2023, after a 4–0 home loss to Clube Atlético Mineiro, Vieira was sacked.

=== Pendikspor ===
Vieira was appointed at Turkish Süper Lig club Pendikspor on 17 October 2023. The following February, with the team second-bottom in the table, he was relieved of his duties.

=== Marítimo ===
On 8 January 2025, Vieira returned to Marítimo as their fourth manager of the second-division season after Fábio Pereira, Silas and Rui Duarte. On 21 May, having secured survival in 12th place, he left.

=== Tondela ===
On 14 June 2025, Vieira signed a one-year contract with C.D. Tondela, champions of the second tier. He was dismissed on 11 November, after four games without a win and a 17th place in the table.

== Managerial statistics ==
As of 25 February 2024

Managerial record by team and tenure
Team	Nat	From	To	Record							
Team	Nat	From	To	G	W	D	L	GF	GA	GD	Win %
Nacional	(Portugal)	14 March 2011	31 October 2011	23	9	5	9	21	30	−9	39.13
Marítimo B	(Portugal)	19 January 2013	1 July 2014	61	18	16	27	59	74	−15	29.51
Marítimo	(Portugal)	2 March 2015	18 January 2016	36	15	8	13	57	56	+1	41.67
Aves	(Portugal)	27 May 2016	15 February 2017	30	16	9	5	48	29	+19	53.33
Académica	(Portugal)	30 May 2017	13 November 2017	16	8	3	5	24	17	+7	50.00
Estoril	(Portugal)	13 November 2017	16 May 2018	23	6	6	11	21	35	−14	26.09
Moreirense	(Portugal)	28 May 2018	19 May 2019	38	18	4	16	46	50	−4	47.37
Vitória Guimarães	(Portugal)	17 June 2019	24 July 2020	52	22	16	14	83	51	+32	42.31
Al Wehda	(Saudi Arabia)	10 September 2020	2 February 2021	17	6	3	8	21	27	−6	35.29
Famalicão	(Portugal)	8 March 2021	19 December 2021	33	13	8	12	55	46	+9	39.39
Gil Vicente	(Portugal)	29 June 2022	2 November 2022	17	4	4	9	19	27	−8	23.53
Cuiabá	(Brazil)	8 December 2022	10 May 2023	24	16	3	5	49	21	+28	66.67
Pendikspor	(Turkey)	17 October 2023	27 February 2024	21	7	4	10	30	43	−13	33.33
Total				391	158	89	144	533	506	+27	40.41

== Honours ==
Cuiabá

- Campeonato Mato-Grossense: 2023

Individual

- Primeira Liga Manager of the Month: January 2019

== See also ==
- List of one-club men
