= Daniel Sousa (football manager) =

Portuguese football manager (born 1984)

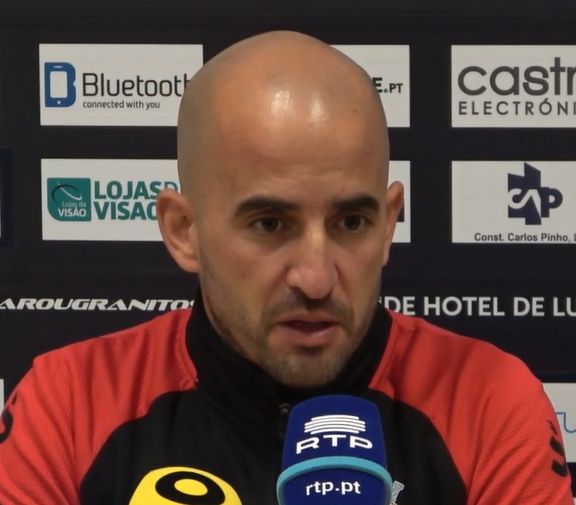
- Sousa in 2024

Personal information
- Full name: Pedro Daniel da Cunha Pereira de Sousa
- Date of birth: 3 October 1984 (age 42)
- Place of birth: Barcelos, Portugal

Managerial career
- Years: Team
- 2022–2023: Gil Vicente
- 2023–2024: Arouca
- 2024: Braga
- 2024–2025: Vitória Guimarães

Pedro Daniel da Cunha Pereira de Sousa (born 3 October 1984) is a Portuguese football manager.

For over a decade, he was assistant manager to André Villas-Boas. He started managing in the Primeira Liga in 2022, with Gil Vicente, Arouca, Braga and Vitória Guimarães.

== Coaching career ==
=== Assistant ===
Sousa first met the Portuguese coach André Villas-Boas when the former was a student at the University of Porto, in the Faculty of Sports. He interviewed Villas-Boas about strategies for attacking football as part of his final-year thesis, and was later recommended to the young manager by professor of football José Guilherme, who was Villas-Boas' assistant at Académica. Sousa was Villas-Boas' match analyst at Académica, Porto, Chelsea, Tottenham Hotspur, and Zenit Saint Petersburg, and his assistant manager at Zenit, Shanghai Port and Marseille, spanning ten years of service.

=== Gil Vicente ===
On 16 November 2022, Sousa was named in his first managerial job, at his hometown club Gil Vicente. He replaced Ivo Vieira at the 16th-placed team. His debut four days later was a 2–2 draw at Covilhã in the Taça da Liga group stage; by winning the two other games they made the quarter-finals and lost 2–0 to eventual winners Porto.

Sousa's first Primeira Liga game was a 1–0 home win over Santa Clara on 29 December 2022. The following 26 February, he won 2–1 away to Porto, one of only three losses over the season for the opponents and of two at the Estádio do Dragão. After a 13th-placed finish, he left on 26 June 2023 as the club president wanted a different manager.

=== Arouca ===
On 15 November 2023, following the sacking of Daniel Ramos, Sousa was appointed manager of Arouca, who sat last place in the Primeira Liga table, signing a contract until the end of the 2023–24 season. He made his debut eleven days later in the fourth round of the Taça de Portugal at home to Boavista and won on penalties after a 2–2 home draw. On 3 December, away to the same opponents, he won 4–0 in his first league game. He was the Manager of the Month for February 2024 with three wins and a loss, including a 3–2 home victory against Porto.

Sousa departed the club on 20 May 2024, after a seventh-place finish in the campaign.

=== Braga ===
On 24 May 2024, Sousa was announced as manager of Braga, signing a two-year contract. He was sacked after four games, split equally between wins and draws, with president António Salvador not giving a reason and the manager going to court for compensation.

=== Vitória Guimarães ===
On 26 December 2024, Sousa signed an 18-month deal at Braga's Minho rivals Vitória Guimarães, also in the top tier. He replaced Rui Borges, as the latter had moved to Sporting CP. He was sacked on 13 January after only three games: league draws conceding last-minute equalisers to Farense and Sporting – the latter a 4–4 tie – and a 2–1 loss away to fourth-tier O Elvas in the fifth round of the cup.

== Managerial statistics ==
As of 13 January 2025

Managerial record by team and tenure
Team	Nat	From	To	Record								Ref
Team	Nat	From	To	G	W	D	L	GF	GA	GD	Win %	Ref
Gil Vicente	(Portugal)	16 November 2022	26 June 2023	25	10	5	10	28	24	+4	40.00	
Arouca	(Portugal)	15 November 2023	20 May 2024	25	12	5	8	47	36	+11	48.00	
Braga	(Portugal)	24 May 2024	11 August 2024	4	2	2	0	8	1	+7	50.00	
Vitória	(Portugal)	26 December 2024	13 January 2025	3	0	2	1	7	8	−1	0.00	
Total				57	24	14	19	90	69	+21	42.11	—

== Honours ==
Individual

- Primeira Liga Manager of the Month: February 2024,
