= Miguel Leal =

Portuguese football manager (born 1965)

Personal information
- Full name: António Miguel Nunes Ferraz Leal de Araújo
- Date of birth: 22 April 1965 (age 61)
- Place of birth: Marco de Canaveses, Portugal

Managerial career
- Years: Team
- 1999–2000: Régua
- 2000–2001: Penafiel (youth)
- 2001–2002: Leixões (assistant)
- 2002–2003: Marco
- 2004: Penafiel
- 2004–2005: Padroense (youth)
- 2005–2006: Paredes (assistant)
- 2006–2007: Beira-Mar (assistant)
- 2007–2008: Aliados Lordelo (assistant)
- 2008–2009: Penafiel (assistant)
- 2011–2012: Penafiel (youth)
- 2012–2014: Penafiel
- 2014–2016: Moreirense
- 2016–2017: Boavista
- 2017–2018: Arouca
- 2019: Cova Piedade
- 2019–2020: Penafiel
- 2020: Varzim
- 2021: Cova Piedade
- 2023–2024: Al-Tadamon
- 2025: Al-Tadamon

António Miguel Nunes Ferraz Leal de Araújo (born 22 April 1965), known as Leal, is a Portuguese football manager.

He had several spells in charge of Penafiel, and four other second-tier clubs. In the Primeira Liga, he led Moreirense and Boavista.

== Career ==
Born in Marco de Canaveses, Porto District, Leal only played amateur football, retiring in 1998 after a three-year spell with Salvadorense. His first head coaching spell arrived midway through the 2002–03 season, and he was able to help Marco narrowly avoid relegation from the Segunda Liga.

From 2004 to 2009, Leal worked mainly as an assistant manager, representing in that capacity Paredes, Beira-Mar, Aliados Lordelo and Penafiel. In the 2009–10 campaign, he acted as fitness coach at Turkish club Gaziantepspor.

On 28 May 2012, after another youth spell with Penafiel, Leal was appointed as coach of the first team. He led them to the ninth position in his first year, achieving promotion to the Primeira Liga in the following after a third-place finish as the runners-up Porto B were not eligible; following this success, he was voted coach of the season.

On 16 May 2014, Leal signed with Moreirense also in the top division. He left on 19 May 2016 following the expiration of his contract, after consecutively managing to lead the team into safety.

On 11 October 2016, Leal was announced as the new Boavista manager after the club parted ways with Erwin Sánchez. He was relieved of his duties early into the following season, but found accommodation two days after being fired by joining second tier side Arouca.

Leal left Arouca on 26 September 2018, after four consecutive losses put the team in last place at the start of the season. The following 17 January, he came back to the league at Cova da Piedade on a deal until the end of the campaign. When it finished, he returned to Penafiel on 4 June 2019, succeeding Armando Evangelista. His contract ended abruptly due to the COVID-19 pandemic, and his team finished 15th in the aborted season.

On 19 October 2020, Leal returned to work at Varzim, succeeding Paulo Alves at the 17th-placed club. He left on New Year's Day, having won once in nine games and never in the league. On 22 March 2021, he returned to Cova da Piedade.

In July 2023, having been unemployed for two years, Leal was appointed head coach of Al-Tadamon in the Kuwaiti Division One. On 2 February 2024, his side reached the semi-finals of the Emir Cup after ousting holders Kuwait SC on penalties.

== Personal life ==
Leal obtained an academic and Master's degree in physical education, as well as completing a doctorate in psychology.
