= Jorge Simão =

Portuguese football manager (born 1976)

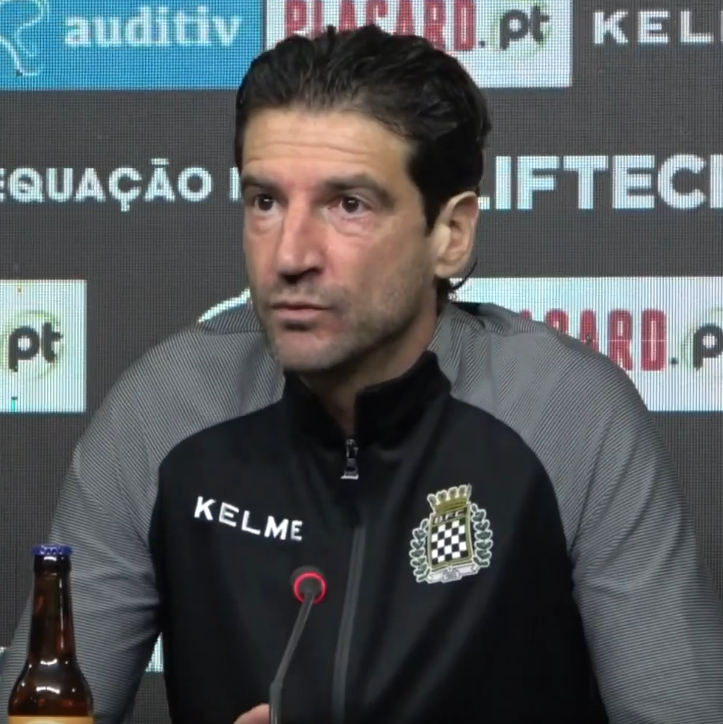
- Simão with Boavista in 2024

Personal information
- Full name: António Jorge Rocha Simão
- Date of birth: 12 August 1976 (age 50)
- Place of birth: Pampilhosa da Serra, Portugal
- Position: Midfielder

Youth career
- 1986–1991: Estrela Amadora
- 1991–1992: Real Massamá
- 1992–1995: Estrela Amadora

Senior career*
Years	Team	Apps	(Gls)
1995–1996	Real Massamá		
1996–2000	Atlético Cacém		
2001	Fanhões		
2001–2002	Carregado		
2002–2003	Pêro Pinheiro		

Managerial career
- 2003–2004: Atlético Cacém (assistant)
- 2004–2005: Sacavenense (assistant)
- 2005–2007: Odivelas (assistant)
- 2007–2009: Olivais Moscavide (assistant)
- 2009: Estrela Amadora (assistant)
- 2012–2014: Belenenses (assistant)
- 2014: Atlético
- 2014–2015: Mafra
- 2015: Belenenses
- 2015–2016: Paços Ferreira
- 2016: Chaves
- 2016–2017: Braga
- 2017–2019: Boavista
- 2019–2020: Al-Fayha
- 2020–2021: Mouscron
- 2021: Paços Ferreira
- 2023: Santa Clara
- 2023–2024: Académico Viseu
- 2024: Boavista
- 2025: Olimpija Ljubljana
- * Club domestic league appearances and goals

António Jorge Rocha Simão (born 12 August 1976) is a Portuguese former footballer who played as a midfielder, currently a manager.

Having played only as an amateur, he began work as an assistant manager at 26, before his first outright position at Atlético in 2014. He led six Primeira Liga clubs, starting with Belenenses.

== Football career ==
Born in Pampilhosa da Serra, Coimbra District, Simão played solely amateur football, emerging through C.F. Estrela da Amadora's youth system and retiring at the age of 26. He started working as a coach in 2003, going on to act as assistant at several clubs.

In February 2014, Simão left his assistant position at Primeira Liga side C.F. Os Belenenses and embarked on his first managerial role by accepting an invitation at Segunda Liga's Atlético Clube de Portugal until the end of the season. Despite claiming 16 points from a possible 36, he was unable to prevent his team from finishing bottom, but they were later reinstated as the competition was expanded.

Subsequently, Simão joined C.D. Mafra from the third division. On 17 March 2015, however, he moved straight to the top tier at Belenenses, replacing Lito Vidigal at the sixth-placed team. His debut five days later was a 1–0 loss at Boavista F.C. and his nine-game spell divided equally between results, leaving their position unchanged and qualification for the UEFA Europa League confirmed.

In the 2015 off-season, Simão succeeded Paulo Fonseca at the helm of F.C. Paços de Ferreira. He left at the end of the campaign, after achieving a seventh-place finish.

Simão started 2016–17 also in the top flight, with G.D. Chaves. On 17 December 2016, he was appointed at S.C. Braga from the same league as a replacement for dismissed José Peseiro. He resigned at the latter in late April 2017, due to poor results.

Simão returned to both active and the Portuguese main division on 14 September 2017, taking over from the fired Miguel Leal at the helm of Boavista. His first game in charge was two days later, and his team managed to defeat current champions S.L. Benfica 2–1 at home. On 26 January 2019, one point above the relegation places, he left by mutual consent to be replaced by Vidigal.

In June that year, Simão's name was discussed by the board of EFL Championship club Middlesbrough for their vacant managerial position, but instead he took his first foreign job at Al-Fayha FC in the Saudi Professional League. In late August 2020, he was dismissed with three games remaining and one point above relegation.

On 14 May 2021, having been relegated with Royal Excel Mouscron of the Belgian Pro League, Simão returned to Paços de Ferreira. On 11 December, after eight matches without a win in all competitions and with the side placed 13th in the league, he left by mutual agreement.

Simão took over from the sacked Mário Silva at C.D. Santa Clara on 11 January 2023, signing a five-month contract. With two points from seven games, he was dismissed on 26 February.

On 27 October 2023, Simão was appointed as manager of second-division Académico de Viseu F.C. on a deal until the end of the season. Before it had ended, however, he returned to the top tier and Boavista on a short-term contract.

Simão took charge of Slovenian PrvaLiga club NK Olimpija Ljubljana on 13 June 2025, replacing Víctor Sánchez who had left in spite of winning the league. On his competitive debut, he oversaw a 3–1 aggregate elimination in the first qualifying round of the UEFA Champions League at the hands of Kazakhstan's FC Kairat. On 5 August, following a 5–0 loss against NK Celje in the domestic league, he was relieved of his duties.

== Managerial statistics ==
As of 6 August 2025

Managerial record by team and tenure
Team	Nat	From	To	Record				
Team	Nat	From	To	G	W	D	L	Win %
Atlético	(Portugal)	17 February 2014	30 June 2014	12	4	4	4	33.33
Mafra	(Portugal)	1 July 2014	17 March 2015	25	15	4	6	60.00
Belenenses	(Portugal)	17 March 2015	30 June 2015	9	3	3	3	33.33
Paços Ferreira	(Portugal)	14 June 2015	21 May 2016	40	15	11	14	37.50
Chaves	(Portugal)	23 May 2016	17 December 2016	17	6	9	2	35.29
Braga	(Portugal)	17 December 2016	25 April 2017	21	8	7	6	38.10
Boavista	(Portugal)	14 September 2017	26 January 2019	52	18	10	24	34.62
Al-Fayha	(Saudi Arabia)	9 June 2019	27 August 2020	30	9	8	13	30.00
Mouscron	(Belgium)	20 October 2020	14 May 2021	26	7	7	12	26.92
Paços Ferreira	(Portugal)	13 May 2021	11 December 2021	23	5	7	11	21.74
Santa Clara	(Portugal)	11 January 2023	26 February 2023	7	0	2	5	0.00
Académico Viseu	(Portugal)	27 October 2023	16 April 2024	22	7	10	5	31.82
Boavista	(Portugal)	16 April 2024	7 June 2024	5	0	3	2	0.00
Olimpija Ljubljana	(Slovenia)	13 June 2025	5 August 2025	7	3	2	2	42.86
Total				296	100	87	109	33.78
