= Betano (company) =

Sports betting company

- Industry: Sports betting, online gambling
- Founded: 2018 (as Betano); 2012 (as Kaizen Gaming)
- Founder: George Daskalakis
- Headquarters: Sliema, Malta
- Owner: Kaizen Gaming International Limited (KGIL)
- Website: www.betano.com

Betano is an international online sports betting and online gambling platform. The brand is owned by Kaizen Gaming International Limited (KGIL), a Greek GameTech company headquartered in Malta. It operates in several countries across Europe and the Americas.

== History and corporate activities ==
The platform's parent company was founded in Athens, Greece, in 2012, initially operating under the name TCB Holdings. In 2013, the group began its operations in Greece and Cyprus with the Stoiximan brand. Later, the Greek gaming company OPAP acquired a majority stake in the group. In 2020, the parent company underwent a corporate restructuring and was officially renamed Kaizen Gaming. Today, the company maintains its operational headquarters in Sliema, Malta.

The Betano brand was created in 2018 to lead the company's international expansion outside Greek-speaking markets. The brand acquired operating licenses and launched in countries such as Romania and Germany. It subsequently expanded to in several countries around the world, including the United Kingdom, Czech Republic, Denmark, Belgium, Portugal, Argentina, Brazil, Chile, Peru, Ecuador, Colombia, Mexico, Canada, among others.

=== Sponsorships and naming rights ===
As part of its global expansion, Betano invests strategically in sports sponsorships.

In Europe, the brand has established partnerships with clubs such as Porto, Sporting, Benfica, Braga, and Belenenses in Portugal; FCSB and CS Universitatea Craiova in Romania; Sparta Prague and Viktoria Plzeň in the Czech Republic; Brøndby IF in Denmark; and Aston Villa in England.

In South America, the company sponsors teams such as Universidad de Chile and Deportes La Serena in Chile; and River Plate in Argentina. In Brazil, the brand has sponsored Atlético Mineiro, Fluminense, and Flamengo.

In addition to clubs, the company acts as a sponsor and acquires naming rights for some competitions. Globally, it has been a regional sponsor for the 2022 FIFA World Cup, the 2025 FIFA Club World Cup, the UEFA Euro 2024, the 2024 Copa América, the UEFA Europa League, the UEFA Conference League and an Official Supporter of the 2026 FIFA World Cup for Europe and South America.

In domestic and continental scenarios, the brand has sponsored tournaments such as the Argentine Primera División, and the Brazilian Brasileirão Série A and Copa do Brasil.
