= João Pedro Sousa =

Portuguese football manager (born 1971)

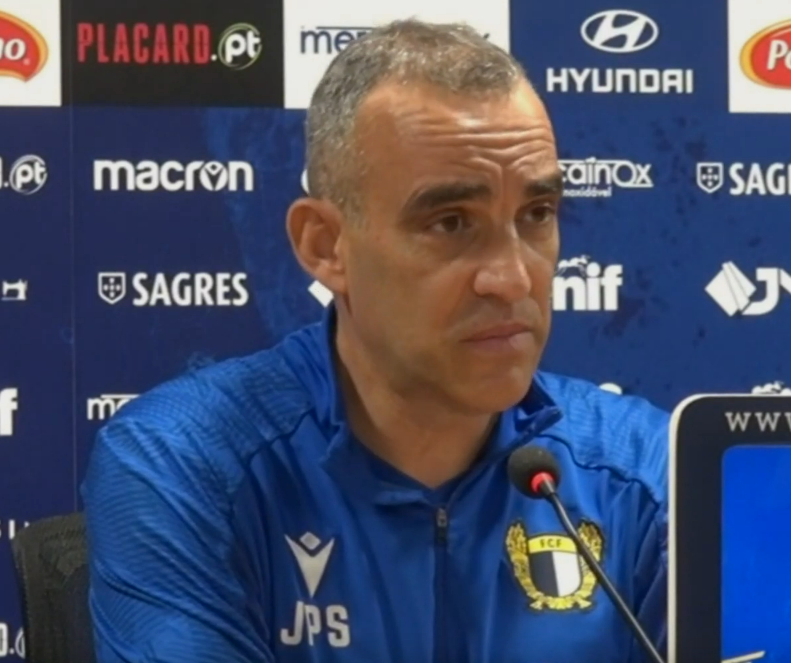
- Sousa with Famalicão in 2023

Personal information
- Full name: João Pedro Ramos Borges Sousa
- Date of birth: 4 August 1971 (age 55)
- Place of birth: Luanda, Portuguese Angola
- Position: Forward

Youth career
- 1984–1991: Braga

Senior career*
Years	Team	Apps	(Gls)
1991–1993	Braga	17	(1)
1993–1995	Chaves	33	(4)
1995–1997	Rio Ave	26	(1)
1997–1998	Vila Real	3	(0)
1998–2001	Trofense	18	(0)
2001–2003	Taipas	8	(8)

Managerial career
- 2006–2009: Academia Lacatomi
- 2009–2010: Famalicão (assistant)
- 2010–2012: Braga (youth)
- 2012–2014: Estoril (assistant)
- 2014–2015: Sporting (assistant)
- 2015–2016: Olympiacos (assistant)
- 2016–2017: Hull City (assistant)
- 2017–2018: Watford (assistant)
- 2018–2019: Everton (assistant)
- 2019–2021: Famalicão
- 2021: Boavista
- 2022: Al-Raed
- 2022–2024: Famalicão
- 2024–2025: Baniyas
- 2025: AVS
- 2026: Petro Luanda
- * Club domestic league appearances and goals

João Pedro Ramos Borges Sousa (born 4 August 1971) is a Portuguese football coach. He most recently managed Primeira Liga club AVS.

After working as an assistant to Marco Silva, he managed in his own right in the Primeira Liga at Famalicão and Boavista.

== Coaching career ==
=== Assistant ===
Sousa was the long-term assistant manager of Marco Silva from 2012 to 2019, who was his former teammate at Trofense. He was the assistant manager to Silva at Primeira Liga clubs Estoril and Sporting, as well as Olympiacos of Super League Greece and English Premier League trio Hull City, Watford, and Everton.

=== Famalicão ===
Sousa became the coach of Famalicão on 31 May 2019, signing a two-year deal at a team who had just achieved promotion to the Primeira Liga for the first time in 25 years. In the first month of the season, he was voted Manager of the Month for winning three and drawing one of the four fixtures. He retained the honour for September with the team from Vila Nova de Famalicão still unbeaten; he earned 56.16% of the votes.

Sousa's team spent much of 2019–20 in contention for European qualification, but missed out to Rio Ave on the last day. In the Taça de Portugal campaign, they reached the semi-finals for the first time but were eliminated 4–3 on aggregate by Benfica. He was dismissed on 31 January 2021, with Famalicão one place above relegation.

=== Boavista ===
On 28 June 2021, Sousa replaced Jesualdo Ferreira as manager of Boavista on a two-year contract. He left on 30 November with the club in 11th, saying that he had received a superior offer from Al-Raed in the Saudi Professional League.

=== Al-Raed ===
Sousa was hired by Al-Raed on 26 January 2022, replacing Spanish manager Pablo Machín. Having won once in eight games, he was suspended and dismissed in late May with two games remaining, for having criticised his players for missing training; he then complained to FIFA.

=== Return to Famalicão ===
On 22 September 2022, Sousa returned to 16th-placed Famalicão. He left the club on 19 March 2024, following a dispute with the board.

=== Baniyas ===
Sousa became the head coach of UAE Pro League club Baniyas ahead of the 2024–25 season. He was later dismissed in January 2025.

=== AVS ===
In September 2025, Sousa signed a two-year contract with AVS. On 16 December, following a 6–0 defeat to Sporting CP, with AVS sitting at the bottom of the Primeira Liga table, he was sacked.

== Managerial statistics ==
As of match played 16 March 2024

Managerial record by team and tenure
Team	Nat	From	To	Record							
Team	Nat	From	To	G	W	D	L	GF	GA	GD	Win %
Famalicão	(Portugal)	31 May 2019	31 January 2021	59	21	19	19	83	88	−5	35.59
Boavista	(Portugal)	28 June 2021	30 November 2021	16	5	5	6	20	27	−7	31.25
Al-Raed	(Saudi Arabia)	26 January 2022	24 May 2022	13	4	3	6	10	18	−8	30.77
Famalicão	(Portugal)	22 September 2022	19 March 2024	65	24	16	25	85	84	+1	36.92
Baniyas	(United Arab Emirates)	1 July 2024	8 January 2025	15	5	3	7	20	28	−8	33.33
Total				164	56	46	62	214	242	−28	34.15

== Honours ==
Individual

- Primeira Liga Manager of the Month: August 2019 September 2019
