= 2024–25 Primeira Liga =

89th season of top-tier Portuguese football

Primeira Liga
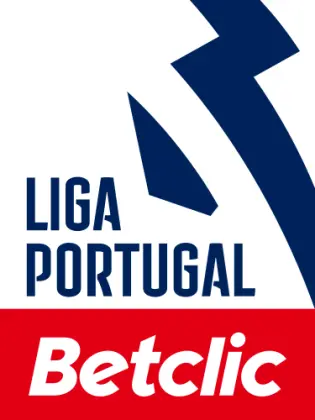
- Season: 2024–25
- Dates: 9 August 2024 – 17 May 2025
- Champions: Sporting CP; 21st title
- Relegated: Farense; Boavista (to Porto Football Association)
- Champions League: Sporting CP; Benfica
- Europa League: Porto; Braga
- Conference League: Santa Clara
- Matches: 306
- Goals: 786 (2.57 per match)
- Top goalscorer: Viktor Gyökeres (39 goals)
- Biggest home win: Benfica 6–0 AVS (27 April 2025)
- Biggest away win: Nacional 1–6 Sporting CP (17 August 2024); Farense 0–5 Sporting CP (23 August 2024); AVS 0–5 Porto (29 October 2024)
- Highest scoring: Vitória de Guimarães 4–4 Sporting CP (3 January 2025)
- Longest winning run: 11 matches Sporting CP
- Longest unbeaten run: 21 matches Sporting CP
- Longest winless run: 13 matches Boavista; Farense
- Longest losing run: 8 matches Boavista
- Highest attendance: 63,478; Benfica 1–1 Sporting (10 May 2025)
- Lowest attendance: 0 Santa Clara 1–1 Moreirense (9 March 2025)
- Total attendance: 3,761,888 (306 matches)
- Average attendance: 12,194

The 2024–25 Liga Portugal (also known as Liga Portugal Betclic for sponsorship reasons) was the 91st season of the Primeira Liga, the top professional league for Portuguese association football clubs and the second season under the current Liga Portugal Betclic title. This was the eighth Primeira Liga season to use video assistant referee (VAR). Sporting CP were the defending champions, having won their 20th title the previous season, and successfully defended their title, securing their 21st Primeira Liga title and their first back-to-back title since the 1953–54 season.

== Teams ==
=== Changes ===
Santa Clara (after one-year absence), Nacional (after three-year absence), and AVS (promoted for the first time in their history), were promoted from the 2023–24 Liga Portugal 2, replacing Vizela, Chaves, and Portimonense (relegated after three, two, and seven years in the top flight, respectively).

=== Stadia and locations ===
Location of teams in 2024–25 Primeira Liga
Lisbon area teams
Location of teams in 2024–25 Primeira Liga (Madeira)
Location of teams in 2024–25 Primeira Liga (Azores)

Team	Location	Stadium	Capacity	2023–24
Arouca	Arouca	Estádio Municipal de Arouca	5,600	7th
AVS	Vila das Aves	Estádio do CD Aves	6,230	3rd (LP2)
Benfica	Lisbon	Estádio da Luz	65,592	2nd
Boavista	Porto	Estádio do Bessa	28,263	15th
Braga	Braga	Estádio Municipal de Braga	30,286	4th
Casa Pia	Lisbon	Estádio Municipal de Rio Maior (Note: Estádio Pina Manique official stadium, not licensed for competition.)	7,000	9th
Estoril	Estoril	Estádio António Coimbra da Mota	5,094	13th
Estrela da Amadora	Amadora	Estádio José Gomes	9,288	14th
Famalicão	Vila Nova de Famalicão	Estádio Municipal de Famalicão	5,186	8th
Farense	Faro	Estádio de São Luís	7,000	10th
Gil Vicente	Barcelos	Estádio Cidade de Barcelos	12,046	12th
Moreirense	Moreira de Cónegos	Estádio Comendador Joaquim de Almeida Freitas	6,150	6th
Nacional	Funchal	Estádio da Madeira	5,200	2nd (LP2)
Porto	Porto	Estádio do Dragão	50,033	3rd
Rio Ave	Vila do Conde	Estádio dos Arcos	5,300	11th
Santa Clara	Ponta Delgada	Estádio de São Miguel	12,500	1st (LP2)
Sporting CP	Lisbon	Estádio José Alvalade	50,095	1st
Vitória de Guimarães	Guimarães	Estádio D. Afonso Henriques	30,029	5th

=== Personnel and sponsors ===
Team	Manager	Captain	Kit Maker	Sponsors	
Team	Manager	Captain	Kit Maker	Main	Other
Arouca	(Portugal) Vasco Seabra	(Portugal) David Simão	Skita	Construções; Carlos Pinho	List: Front: None; Back: Castro Electrónica, Bluetooth - Imp. exp. telem., Lda; Sleeves: None; Shorts: PontoPT
AVS	(Portugal) Rui Ferreira	(Mexico) Guillermo Ochoa	Adidas	Mercainox	List: Front: Tectoave; Back: AUTONI - Pneus e Óleos, Lda, GoDrive Rent a Car; Sleeves: GuimaGold Hotel; Shorts: RE/MAX, Auditiv
Benfica	(Portugal) Bruno Lage	(Argentina) Nicolás Otamendi	Adidas	Emirates	List: Front: None; Back: Sagres; Sleeves: Betano; Shorts: None
Boavista	(Scotland) Stuart Baxter	(Colombia) Sebastián Pérez	Kelme	None	List: Front: Cerveja Nortada; Back: Estrella Galicia, Auditiv; Sleeves: FC Car Automóveis; Shorts: None
Braga	(Portugal) Carlos Carvalhal	(Portugal) Ricardo Horta	Puma	Moosh Portugal	List: Front: Só Barroso; Back: AMCO Intermediários de Crédito, Piscinas Soleo; Sleeves: Auditiv; Shorts: 2045 Segurança
Casa Pia	(Portugal) João Pereira	(Portugal) José Fonte	Adidas	ESC Online	List: Front: Hospital da Luz; Back: Val Hala Mediação Imobiliária, Meltino Café; Sleeves: Silogia; Shorts: Domino's
Estoril	(Scotland) Ian Cathro	(France) Eliaquim Mangala	Kappa	Solverde.pt	List: Front: None; Back: Gelpeixe, Volkswagen Financial Services; Sleeves: OK Mobility; Shorts: None
Estrela da Amadora	(Portugal) José Faria	(Portugal) Miguel Lopes	Umbro	Correio da Manha	List: Front: Marcos Car SA; Back: ESC Online; Sleeves: Hospital da Luz; Shorts: None
Famalicão	(Portugal) Hugo Oliveira	(Albania) Enea Mihaj	Macron	Placard.pt	List: Front: None; Back: Mercainox, Hyundai Motors; Sleeves: Falual Group; Shorts: JMF SA, Enif Comunicação e Publicidade
Farense	(Portugal) Tozé Marreco	(Portugal) Marco Matias	Lacatoni	Placard.pt	List: Front: Tcars; Back: AP Eva Senses, MSCAR; Sleeves: Aditiv; Shorts: Barao Rodrigues, BF Security
Gil Vicente	(Portugal) César Peixoto	(Portugal) Rúben Fernandes	Lacatoni	GoldenPark	List: Front: Barcelos; Back: Mercainox, H.M Motor; Sleeves: LuxSteel360; Shorts: None
Moreirense	(Italy) Cristiano Bacci	(Brazil) Marcelo	CDT	Placard.pt	List: Front: None; Back: None; Sleeves: JMM Group; Shorts: None
Nacional	(Portugal) Tiago Margarido	(Portugal) João Aurélio	Hummel	Solverde.pt	List: Front: None; Back: Cerveja Coral, Madeira tão tua; Sleeves: None; Shorts: None
Porto	(Argentina) Martín Anselmi	(Portugal) Diogo Costa	New Balance	Betano	List: Front: None; Back: Super Bock; Sleeves: Super Bock (in UEFA matches); Shorts: None
Rio Ave	(Portugal) Petit	(Portugal) Vítor Gomes	Puma	Solverde.pt	List: Front: None; Back: UZO, Confirent Rent a Car; Sleeves: None; Shorts: None
Santa Clara	(Portugal) Vasco Matos	(Brazil) Gabriel Batista	Umbro	Lebull	List: Front: Cerveja Quinas; Back: Açores; Sleeves: Ilha Verde Rent a Car; Shorts: Hospital CUF
Sporting CP	(Portugal) Rui Borges	(Denmark) Morten Hjulmand	Nike	Betano	List: Front: None; Back: Super Bock; Sleeves: Super Bock (in UEFA matches); Shorts: None
Vitória de Guimarães	(Portugal) Luís Freire	(Cape Verde) Bruno Varela	Macron	Placard.pt	List: Front: NorteCar; Back: UZO, GuimarãeShopping; Sleeves: Chanceplus; Shorts: MOOD Imobiliária

=== Managerial changes ===
Team	Outgoing manager	Manner	Date of vacancy	Position in table	Incoming manager	Date of appointment	Ref.
Porto	(Portugal) Sérgio Conceição	Resigned	24 May 2024	Pre-season	(Portugal) Vítor Bruno	6 June 2024	
Braga	(Portugal) Rui Duarte	End of interim spell	24 May 2024	Pre-season	(Portugal) Daniel Sousa	24 May 2024	
Braga	(Portugal) Daniel Sousa	Sacked	11 August 2024	8th	(Portugal) Carlos Carvalhal	12 August 2024	
Gil Vicente	(Portugal) Tozé Marreco	Resigned	8 August 2024	18th	(Portugal) Bruno Pinheiro	9 August 2024	
Benfica	(Germany) Roger Schmidt	Sacked	1 September 2024	7th	(Portugal) Bruno Lage	5 September 2024	
Estrela da Amadora	(Portugal) Filipe Martins	Resigned	22 September 2024	17th	(Portugal) José Faria	23 September 2024	
Farense	(Portugal) José Mota	Mutual agreement	24 September 2024	18th	(Portugal) Tozé Marreco	25 September 2024	
Arouca	(Spain) Gonzalo García	Mutual agreement	28 October 2024	14th	(Portugal) Vasco Seabra	29 October 2024	
Rio Ave	(Portugal) Luís Freire	Sacked	5 November 2024	14th	(Portugal) Petit	6 November 2024	
Sporting CP	(Portugal) Ruben Amorim	Signed by Manchester United	11 November 2024	1st	(Portugal) João Pereira	11 November 2024	
AVS	(Portugal) Vítor Campelos	Sacked	12 November 2024	13th	(Portugal) Daniel Ramos	15 November 2024	
Famalicão	(Portugal) Armando Evangelista	Sacked	2 December 2024	8th	(Cape Verde) Ricardo Silva (caretaker)	3 December 2024	
Famalicão	(Cape Verde) Ricardo Silva (caretaker)	End of caretaker spell	3 December 2024	8th	(Portugal) Hugo Oliveira	10 December 2024	
Sporting CP	(Portugal) João Pereira	Sacked	25 December 2024	2nd	(Portugal) Rui Borges	26 December 2024	
Vitória de Guimarães	(Portugal) Rui Borges	Signed by Sporting CP	26 December 2024	6th	(Portugal) Daniel Sousa	26 December 2024	
Porto	(Portugal) Vítor Bruno	Sacked	20 January 2025	3rd	(Portugal) José Tavares (caretaker)	20 January 2025	
Porto	(Portugal) José Tavares	End of caretaker spell	27 January 2025	3rd	(Argentina) Martín Anselmi	27 January 2025	
Boavista	(Italy) Cristiano Bacci	Resigned	8 February 2025	18th	(Angola) Lito Vidigal	9 February 2025	
AVS	(Portugal) Daniel Ramos	Sacked	13 February 2025	13th	(Portugal) Rui Ferreira	16 February 2025	
Gil Vicente	(Portugal) Bruno Pinheiro	Sacked	18 February 2025	14th	(Portugal) José Pedro Pinto	20 February 2025	
Moreirense	(Portugal) César Peixoto	Sacked	24 February 2025	10th	(Italy) Cristiano Bacci	28 February 2025	
Boavista	(Angola) Lito Vidigal	Sacked	6 April 2025	18th	(Portugal) Jorge Couto (caretaker)	6 April 2025	
Boavista	(Portugal) Jorge Couto	End of caretaker spell	13 April 2025	18th	(Scotland) Stuart Baxter	13 April 2025	

== League table ==
Pos	Team	Pld	W	D	L	GF	GA	GD	Pts	Qualification or relegation
1	Sporting CP (C)	34	25	7	2	88	27	+61	82	Qualification for the Champions League league phase
2	Benfica	34	25	5	4	84	28	+56	80	Qualification for the Champions League third qualifying round
3	Porto	34	22	5	7	65	30	+35	71	Qualification for the Europa League league phase (Note: The 2024–25 Taça de Portugal winners (Sporting) finished in the top two, thus the third place team got the league stage berth.)
4	Braga	34	19	9	6	55	30	+25	66	Qualification for the Europa League second qualifying round
5	Santa Clara	34	17	6	11	36	32	+4	57	Qualification for the Conference League second qualifying round
6	Vitória de Guimarães	34	14	12	8	47	37	+10	54	
7	Famalicão	34	12	11	11	44	39	+5	47	
8	Estoril	34	12	10	12	48	53	−5	46	
9	Casa Pia	34	12	9	13	39	44	−5	45	
10	Moreirense	34	10	10	14	42	50	−8	40	
11	Rio Ave	34	9	11	14	39	55	−16	38	
12	Arouca	34	9	11	14	35	49	−14	38	
13	Gil Vicente	34	8	10	16	34	47	−13	34	
14	Nacional	34	9	7	18	32	50	−18	34	
15	Estrela da Amadora	34	7	8	19	24	50	−26	29	
16	AVS (O)	34	5	12	17	25	60	−35	27 (Note: Head to head points: AVS 4, Farense 1.)	Qualification for the relegation play-offs
17	Farense (R)	34	6	9	19	25	46	−21	27	Relegation to Liga Portugal 2
18	Boavista (D, R)	34	6	6	22	24	59	−35	24	Administrative relegation to Porto Football Association

Source: Liga Portugal
Rules for classification: 1) Points; 2) Head-to-head points; 3) Head-to-head goal difference; 4) Goal difference; 5) Matches won; 6) Goals scored; 7) Play-off.
(C) Champions; (D) Disqualified; (O) Play-off winners; (R) Relegated

== Relegation play-offs ==
The relegation play-offs took place between AVS, who finished 16th in the Primeira Liga, and Vizela, who finished 3rd in Liga Portugal 2.

All times are WEST (UTC+1).

Team 1	Agg.	Team 2	1st leg	2nd leg
AVS	5–2	Vizela	3–0	2–2

1st leg

24 May 2025
19:45 UTC+1

AVS	3–0	Vizela
Assunção 62' (pen.); Akinsola 67', 70'	Report

Estádio do CD Aves, Vila das Aves
Attendance: 2,715
Referee: Gustavo Correia

2nd leg

1 June 2025
19:45 UTC+1

Vizela	2–2	AVS
Fonseca 14' (o.g.); Mörschel 77' (pen.)	Report	Akinsola 38'; Assunção 64'

Estádio do Futebol Clube de Vizela, Vizela
Attendance: 4,076
Referee: Miguel Nogueira

AVS won 5–2 on aggregate, and therefore both clubs remained in their respective leagues.

== Results ==
Home \ Away	ARO	AVS	BEN	BOA	BRA	CAS	EST	AMA	FAM	FAR	GIL	MOR	NAC	POR	RAV	STA	SPO	VSC
Arouca		1–1	0–2	4–1	1–2	0–0	1–1	1–0	1–2	2–2	1–1	1–0	1–0	0–2	1–1	1–0	0–3	0–1
AVS	0–1		1–1	1–2	0–1	1–1	0–3	1–1	2–3	0–0	1–0	0–3	1–1	0–5	1–0	1–2	2–2	1–0
Benfica	2–2	6–0		3–0	1–2	3–0	3–0	1–0	4–0	3–2	5–1	3–2	3–0	4–1	5–0	4–1	1–1	1–0
Boavista	1–3	0–0	0–3		0–1	2–3	0–0	0–1	0–2	1–1	1–3	0–2	0–1	1–2	0–2	1–0	0–5	1–2
Braga	2–1	4–1	1–1	3–0		1–2	2–2	1–1	3–3	2–0	2–0	3–1	1–0	1–0	4–0	1–1	2–4	0–2
Casa Pia	3–1	1–1	3–1	0–1	2–1		1–3	1–0	1–1	1–1	1–0	3–1	1–0	0–1	2–1	0–2	1–3	1–1
Estoril	4–1	0–0	1–2	2–1	0–2	0–2		4–0	2–1	2–2	0–0	2–2	1–0	1–2	2–1	1–4	0–3	1–0
Estrela da Amadora	2–1	0–1	2–3	2–2	0–1	0–1	2–4		0–3	0–1	1–1	2–1	2–0	2–0	1–0	0–0	0–3	2–2
Famalicão	0–0	4–1	2–0	1–0	1–1	2–1	3–0	0–0		1–2	1–1	2–0	0–0	1–1	1–0	1–2	0–3	0–0
Farense	0–1	0–1	1–2	0–1	0–1	0–0	1–0	1–0	2–1		0–1	1–2	0–2	0–1	1–2	1–2	0–5	2–2
Gil Vicente	1–1	4–2	0–3	1–2	0–0	1–1	1–2	3–0	0–2	1–0		0–1	2–1	3–1	1–1	0–1	0–0	0–1
Moreirense	3–1	1–1	1–1	1–0	1–2	3–2	2–2	1–1	0–0	0–0	3–2		1–1	0–3	0–2	1–0	2–1	2–2
Nacional	1–2	3–1	0–2	0–0	0–3	3–1	2–2	0–1	2–1	2–0	0–3	1–0		2–0	3–3	2–0	1–6	1–2
Porto	4–0	2–0	1–4	4–0	2–1	2–0	4–0	2–0	2–1	2–1	3–0	3–1	3–0		2–0	1–1	1–1	1–1
Rio Ave	1–0	1–1	2–3	0–2	2–1	2–2	2–2	2–0	1–1	1–0	1–1	3–2	2–1	2–2		1–1	0–3	2–2
Santa Clara	2–0	2–1	0–1	1–0	0–2	2–1	2–3	1–0	2–1	0–0	2–1	1–1	1–0	0–2	1–0		0–1	1–0
Sporting CP	2–2	3–0	1–0	3–2	1–1	2–0	3–1	5–1	3–1	3–1	2–1	3–1	2–0	2–0	3–1	0–1		2–0
Vitória de Guimarães	2–2	2–0	0–3	2–2	0–0	1–0	1–0	2–0	2–1	1–2	4–0	1–0	2–2	0–3	3–0	2–0	4–4	

Updated to match(es) played on 17 May 2025. Source: Liga Portugal
Legend: Blue = home team win; Yellow = draw; Red = away team win.
For upcoming matches, an "a" indicates there is an article about the rivalry between the two participants.

== Statistics ==
=== Top goalscorers ===
Rank	Player	Club	Goals
1	(Sweden) Viktor Gyökeres	Sporting	39
2	(Spain) Samu Aghehowa	Porto	19
2	(Greece) Vangelis Pavlidis	Benfica	19
4	(Brazil) Clayton	Rio Ave	14
5	(Turkey) Kerem Aktürkoğlu	Benfica	11
5	(Morocco) Yanis Begraoui	Estoril	11
5	(Portugal) Ricardo Horta	Braga	11
5	(Venezuela) Alejandro Marqués	Estoril	11
9	(Brazil) Cassiano	Casa Pia	10
9	(Portugal) Rodrigo Mora	Porto	10

==== Hat-tricks ====
Player	For	Against	Result	Date
(Japan) Kanya Fujimoto	Gil Vicente	AVS	4–2 (H)	16 August 2024
(Sweden) Viktor Gyökeres	Sporting	Farense	5–0 (A)	23 August 2024
(Turkey) Kerem Aktürkoğlu	Benfica	Rio Ave	5–0 (H)	27 October 2024
(Spain) Samu Aghehowa	Porto	AVS	5–0 (A)	28 October 2024
(Sweden) Viktor Gyökeres^{4}	Sporting	Estrela da Amadora	5–1 (H)	1 November 2024
(Sweden) Viktor Gyökeres	Sporting	Vitória de Guimarães	4–4 (A)	3 January 2025
(Luxembourg) Leandro Barreiro	Benfica	Famalicão	4–0 (H)	17 January 2025
(Portugal) Pablo	Gil Vicente	Boavista	3–1 (A)	1 April 2025
(Portugal) André Lacximicant	Estoril	AVS	3–0 (A)	4 April 2025
(Greece) Vangelis Pavlidis	Benfica	Porto	4–1 (A)	6 April 2025
(Sweden) Viktor Gyökeres	Sporting	Moreirense	3–1 (H)	18 April 2025
(Sweden) Viktor Gyökeres^{4}	Sporting	Boavista	5–0 (A)	27 April 2025
(Morocco) Yanis Begraoui	Estoril	Estrela da Amadora	4–0 (H)	17 May 2025

Notes

(H) – Home team
(A) – Away team
^{4} Player scored four goals.

=== Clean sheets ===
Rank	Player	Club	Clean sheets
1	(Portugal) Diogo Costa	Porto	16
2	(Ukraine) Anatoliy Trubin	Benfica	13
2	(Cape Verde) Bruno Varela	Vitória de Guimarães	13
4	(Brazil) Gabriel Batista	Santa Clara	11
5	(Brazil) Lucas França	Nacional	8
5	(Czech Republic) Lukáš Horníček	Braga	8
7	(Brazil) Andrew	Gil Vicente	7
7	(Montenegro) Lazar Carević	Famalicão	7
7	(Uruguay) Franco Israel	Sporting	7
7	(Germany) Nico Mantl	Arouca	7
7	(Brazil) Matheus	Braga	7
7	(Costa Rica) Patrick Sequeira	Casa Pia	7
7	(Mexico) Guillermo Ochoa	AVS	6

=== Discipline ===
==== Player ====
- Most yellow cards: 12
  - (Spain) Jaume Grau (AVS)
  - (Argentina) Alan Ruiz (Estrela da Amadora)
- Most red cards: 2
  - (Ivory Coast) Ousmane Diomande (Sporting CP)
  - (Brazil) Sidney Lima (Santa Clara)
  - (Portugal) João Moutinho (Braga)
  - (Colombia) Sebastián Pérez (Boavista)

==== Club ====
- Most yellow cards: 109
  - Santa Clara
- Most red cards: 10
  - Boavista

== Awards ==
=== Monthly awards ===
Month	Player of the Month		Goalkeeper of the Month		Defender of the Month		Midfielder of the Month		Forward of the Month		Manager of the Month		Goal of the Month	
Month	Player	Club	Player	Club	Player	Club	Player	Club	Player	Club	Manager	Club	Player	Club
August	(Sweden) Viktor Gyökeres	Sporting	(Cape Verde) Bruno Varela	Vitória de Guimarães	(Portugal) Francisco Moura	Famalicão	(Portugal) Pedro Gonçalves	Sporting	(Sweden) Viktor Gyökeres	Sporting	(Portugal) Ruben Amorim	Sporting	(Portugal) Gustavo Sá	Famalicão
September/October	(Turkey) Kerem Aktürkoğlu	Benfica	(Portugal) Diogo Costa	Porto	(Portugal) Francisco Moura	Porto	(Japan) Kanya Fujimoto	Gil Vicente	(Turkey) Kerem Aktürkoğlu	Benfica	(Portugal) Ruben Amorim	Sporting	(Portugal) Nuno Santos	Vitória de Guimarães
November	(Argentina) Ángel Di María	Benfica	(Brazil) Gabriel Batista	Santa Clara	(Portugal) Tomás Araújo	Benfica	(Denmark) Morten Hjulmand	Sporting	(Argentina) Ángel Di María	Benfica	(Portugal) Bruno Lage	Benfica	(Guinea-Bissau) Elves Baldé	Farense
December	(Spain) Samu Aghehowa	Porto	(Costa Rica) Patrick Sequeira	Casa Pia	(Portugal) Alberto Baio	Vitória de Guimarães	(Spain) Nico González	Porto	(Spain) Samu Aghehowa	Porto	(Portugal) Vítor Bruno	Porto	(Portugal) Miguel Menino	Farense
January	(Portugal) João Carvalho	Estoril	(Poland) Cezary Miszta	Rio Ave	(Ivory Coast) Ousmane Diomande	Sporting	(Portugal) João Carvalho	Estoril	(Brazil) Clayton	Rio Ave	(Scotland) Ian Cathro	Estoril	(Portugal) Francisco Trincão	Sporting
February	(Greece) Vangelis Pavlidis	Benfica	(Montenegro) Lazar Carević	Famalicão	(Portugal) Tomás Araújo	Benfica	(Portugal) João Carvalho	Estoril	(Greece) Vangelis Pavlidis	Benfica	(Portugal) Bruno Lage	Benfica	(Portugal) Ricardinho	Santa Clara
March	(Sweden) Viktor Gyökeres	Sporting	(Portugal) Rui Silva	Sporting	(Spain) Álvaro Carreras	Benfica	(Turkey) Orkun Kökçü	Benfica	(Sweden) Viktor Gyökeres	Sporting	(Portugal) Bruno Lage	Benfica	(Portugal) Benny	Moreirense
April	(Portugal) Rodrigo Mora	Porto	(Portugal) Rui Silva	Sporting	(Argentina) Nicolás Otamendi	Benfica	(Portugal) Rodrigo Mora	Porto	(Sweden) Viktor Gyökeres	Sporting	(Portugal) Bruno Lage	Benfica	(Portugal) João Mendes	Vitória de Guimarães

=== Annual awards ===
Award	Winner	Club
Player of the Season	(Sweden) Viktor Gyökeres	Sporting
Manager of the Season	(Portugal) Rui Borges	Sporting
Top scorer	(Sweden) Viktor Gyökeres	Sporting
Young Player of the Season	(Portugal) Geovany Quenda	Sporting
Goal of the Season	(Guinea-Bissau) Elves Baldé	Farense
Save of the Season	(Mexico) Guillermo Ochoa	AVS

Team of the Year

Team of the Year
Goalkeeper	(Portugal) Diogo Costa (Porto)				
Defence	(Spain) Álvaro Carreras (Benfica)	(Portugal) Gonçalo Inácio (Sporting)		(Argentina) Nicolás Otamendi (Benfica)	(Ivory Coast) Ousmane Diomande (Sporting)
Midfield	(Greece) Vangelis Pavlidis (Benfica)	(Norway) Fredrik Aursnes (Benfica)	(Denmark) Morten Hjulmand (Sporting)	(Portugal) Tiago Silva (Vitória de Guimarães)	(Portugal) Francisco Trincão (Sporting)
Attack	(Sweden) Viktor Gyökeres (Sporting)				

== Number of teams by district ==
Rank	District Football Associations	Number	Teams
1	Braga	5	Braga, Famalicão, Gil Vicente, Moreirense and Vitória de Guimarães
1	Lisbon	5	Benfica, Casa Pia, Estoril, Estrela da Amadora and Sporting CP
3	Porto	4	AVS, Boavista, Porto and Rio Ave
4	Faro	1	Farense
4	Aveiro	1	Arouca
4	Ponta Delgada	1	Santa Clara
4	Funchal	1	Nacional

== Attendances ==
No.	Club	Average attendance	Change	Highest
1	SL Benfica	58,746	4,4%	63,478
2	Sporting CP	42,529	6,1%	49,155
3	FC Porto	40,609	7,1%	49,193
4	Vitória SC	18,447	6,1%	28,133
5	SC Braga	13,868	-10,2%	21,215
6	Boavista FC	7,212	-32,1%	18,322
7	SC Farense	7,165	43,3%	17,793
8	Gil Vicente FC	5,496	10,6%	11,010
9	FC Famalicão	3,808	-1,3%	5,025
10	CF Estrela da Amadora	3,704	-15,9%	7,031
11	CD Santa Clara	3,074	44,3%	9,933
12	GD Estoril Praia	2,723	-12,8%	5,026
13	Rio Ave FC	2,591	-17,7%	4,756
14	AVS Futebol	2,407	157,7%	5,473
15	CD Nacional	2,396	14,9%	5,086
16	Moreirense FC	2,387	-7,0%	5,817
17	FC Arouca	2,111	8,5%	4,644
18	Casa Pia AC	2,043	-23,1%	7,051

== See also ==
- 2024–25 Liga Portugal 2
- 2024–25 Liga 3
- 2024–25 Campeonato de Portugal
- 2024–25 Taça de Portugal
