= 2025 Taça de Portugal final =

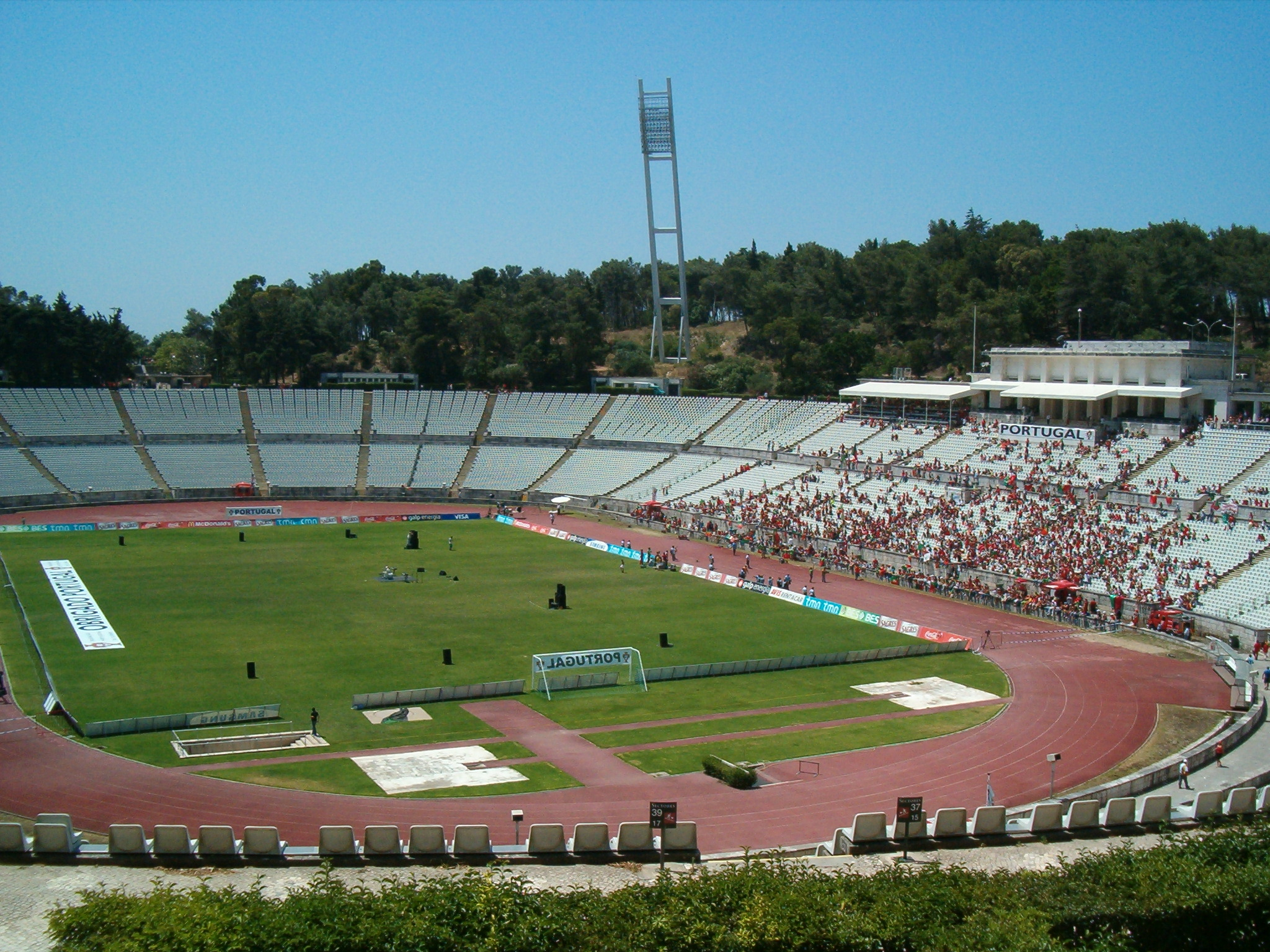
- Estádio Nacional
- Event: 2024–25 Taça de Portugal
Benfica	Sporting CP
1	3
- After extra time
- Date: 25 May 2025
- Venue: Estádio Nacional, Oeiras
- Man of the Match: Conrad Harder
- Fair Player of the Match: Florentino Luís
- Referee: Luís Godinho
- Attendance: 37,393

The 2025 Taça de Portugal final was the last match of the 2024–25 Taça de Portugal, which decided the winner of the 85th season of the Taça de Portugal, the premier knockout cup competition in Portuguese football. It was played on 25 May 2025 at the Estádio Nacional in Oeiras, between Primeira Liga and Lisbon rivals Benfica and Sporting CP.

Sporting played their 31st final in the competition, having last appeared in the 2024 final when they lost to Porto.

Sporting went on to successfully win the title and by defeating Benfica 3–1 after extra time. Sporting secured their 18th title in the competition.

== Route to the final ==
Benfica		Round	Sporting
Opponent	Result	2024–25 Taça de Portugal	Opponent	Result
Pevidém	2–0 (A)	Third round	Portimonense	2–1 (A)
Estrela da Amadora	7–0 (H)	Fourth round	Amarante	6–0 (H)
Farense	3–1 (A)	Fifth round	Santa Clara	2–1 (H)
Braga	1–0 (H)	Quarter-finals	Gil Vicente	1–0 (A)
Tirsense	5–0 (A)	Semi-finals	Rio Ave	2–0 (H)
Tirsense	4–0 (H)	Semi-finals	Rio Ave	2–1 (A)

Note: H = home fixture, A = away fixture

== Match ==
=== Details ===
25 May 2025
17:15 WEST (UTC+01:00)

Benfica	1–3 (a.e.t.)	Sporting CP
Kökçü 47'	Report	Gyökeres 90+11' (pen.); Harder 99'; Trincão 120+1'

Estádio Nacional, Oeiras
Attendance: 37,393
Referee: Luís Godinho

Benfica	Sporting CP

GK	24	(Portugal) Samuel Soares	(yellow card) 114'
CB	30	(Argentina) Nicolás Otamendi (c)
CB	4	(Portugal) António Silva
CB	3	(Spain) Álvaro Carreras	(yellow card) 53'
RM	44	(Portugal) Tomás Araújo		(substituted off) 77'
CM	10	(Turkey) Orkun Kökçü	(yellow card) 65'	(substituted off) 69'
CM	61	(Portugal) Florentino Luís
LM	26	(Sweden) Samuel Dahl	(yellow card) 19'	(substituted off) 103'
AM	27	(Portugal) Bruma		(substituted off) 90+1'
AM	17	(Turkey) Kerem Aktürkoğlu		(substituted off) 70'
CF	14	(Greece) Vangelis Pavlidis		(substituted off) 77'
Substitutes:
GK	1	(Ukraine) Anatoliy Trubin
DF	81	(Albania) Adrian Bajrami
MF	8	(Norway) Fredrik Aursnes		(substituted on) 77'
MF	18	(Luxembourg) Leandro Barreiro		(substituted on) 90+1'
MF	85	(Portugal) Renato Sanches		(substituted on) 69'
FW	9	(Brazil) Arthur Cabral
FW	11	(Argentina) Ángel Di María		(substituted on) 103'
FW	19	(Italy) Andrea Belotti		(substituted on) 77'
FW	21	(Norway) Andreas Schjelderup		(substituted on) 70'
Manager:
(Portugal) Bruno Lage			(yellow card) 126'

GK	24	(Portugal) Rui Silva
CB	72	(Portugal) Eduardo Quaresma		(substituted off) 83'
CB	3	(Netherlands) Jerry St. Juste		(substituted off) 83'
CB	25	(Portugal) Gonçalo Inácio		(substituted off) 58'
RM	21	(Mozambique) Geny Catamo		(substituted off) 75'
CM	6	(Belgium) Zeno Debast		(substituted off) 58'
CM	42	(Denmark) Morten Hjulmand (c)	(yellow card) 90+2'
LM	20	(Uruguay) Maximiliano Araújo	(yellow card) 86'	(substituted off) 115'
AM	17	(Portugal) Francisco Trincão
AM	8	(Portugal) Pedro Gonçalves		(substituted off) 75'
CF	9	(Sweden) Viktor Gyökeres
Substitutes:
GK	1	(Uruguay) Franco Israel
DF	2	(Brazil) Matheus Reis		(substituted on) 83'
DF	22	(Spain) Iván Fresneda		(substituted on) 83'
DF	46	(Cape Verde) David Moreira		(substituted on) 115'
MF	5	(Japan) Hidemasa Morita		(substituted on) 58'
MF	73	(Portugal) Eduardo Felicíssimo
FW	19	(Denmark) Conrad Harder	(yellow card) 78'	(substituted on) 75'
FW	30	(Brazil) Biel Teixeira
FW	57	(Portugal) Geovany Quenda	(yellow card) 101'	(substituted on) 75'
Manager:
(Portugal) Rui Borges

Man of the Match:
Conrad Harder (Sporting CP)
Fair Player of the Match:
Florentino Luís (Benfica)

Assistant referees:
Rui Teixeira
Pedro Mota
Fourth official:
Sandra Bastos
Video assistant referee:
Tiago Martins
Assistant video assistant referees:
Vasco Santos
Sérgio Jesus

Match rules

- 90 minutes
- 30 minutes of extra time if necessary
- Penalty shoot-out if scores still level
- Nine named substitutes
- Maximum of five substitutions, with a sixth allowed in extra time (Note: Each team was given only three opportunities to make substitutions, with a fourth opportunity in extra time, excluding substitutions made at half-time, before the start of extra time and at half-time in extra time.)

== See also ==
- Derby de Lisboa
- 2024–25 S.L. Benfica season
- 2024–25 Sporting CP season
- 2025 Taça da Liga final
