= 2025 Taça da Liga final =

- Event: 2024–25 Taça da Liga
Benfica	Sporting CP
1	1
- Benfica won 7–6 on penalties
- Date: 11 January 2025
- Venue: Estádio Dr. Magalhães Pessoa, Leiria
- Man of the Match: Florentino Luís (Benfica)
- Referee: João Pinheiro
- Attendance: 20,736

The 2025 Taça da Liga final was the final match of the 2024–25 Taça da Liga, the eighteenth season of the Taça da Liga. It was played on 11 January 2025 at Estádio Dr. Magalhães Pessoa.

The competition was contested exclusively by clubs competing in the two professional divisions of Portuguese football – the top-tier Primeira Liga and the second-tier Liga Portugal 2. This season featured only eight teams in the competition.

Benfica and Sporting CP faced off for the third time in a rematch of the 2022 final. In the final, Benfica won the final 7–6 after a penalty shoot-out, to earn their eighth title, and their first title since 2016.

== Background ==
The competition format was changed this season, featuring the return of the final four format with both the semi-finals and the final being played over a space of a few days in the same venue. The Estádio Dr. Magalhães Pessoa hosted all matches. The two teams had played in two finals, the second final in 2009 with Benfica winning on penalty kicks and the 2022 final, where Sporting won 2–1.

== Route to the final ==
Note: In all results below, the score of the finalist is given first (H: home; A: away).

Benfica			Round	Sporting CP		
Opponent	Result	Stadium	Knockout phase	Opponent	Result	Stadium
Santa Clara	3–0 (H)	Estádio da Luz	Quarter-finals	Nacional	3–1 (H)	Estádio José Alvalade
Braga	3–0 (N)	Estádio Dr. Magalhães Pessoa	Semi-finals	Porto	1–0 (N)	Estádio Dr. Magalhães Pessoa

== Match ==
=== Details ===
11 January 2025
19:45 WET

Sporting CP	1–1	Benfica
Gyökeres 42' (pen.)	Report	Schjelderup 29'
Penalties
Gyökeres (penalty scored); Hjulmand (penalty scored); Harder (penalty scored); Araújo (penalty scored); Debast (penalty scored); Quenda (penalty scored); Trincão (penalty missed)	6–7	(penalty scored) Di María; (penalty scored) Amdouni; (penalty scored) Otamendi; (penalty scored) Aktürkoğlu; (penalty scored) Sanches; (penalty scored) Barreiro; (penalty scored) Florentino

Estádio Dr. Magalhães Pessoa, Leiria
Attendance: 20,736
Referee: João Pinheiro

Sporting	Benfica

GK	1	(Uruguay) Franco Israel
RB	72	(Portugal) Eduardo Quaresma		(substituted off) 67'
CB	26	(Ivory Coast) Ousmane Diomande
CB	3	(Netherlands) Jerry St. Juste
LB	57	(Portugal) Geovany Quenda
RM	21	(Mozambique) Geny Catamo		(substituted off) 81'
CM	52	(Portugal) João Simões		(substituted off) 81'
CM	42	(Denmark) Morten Hjulmand (c)
LM	20	(Uruguay) Maximiliano Araújo	(yellow card) 46'
CF	17	(Portugal) Francisco Trincão
CF	9	(Sweden) Viktor Gyökeres
Substitutes:
GK	13	(Bosnia and Herzegovina) Vladan Kovačević
DF	6	(Belgium) Zeno Debast		(substituted on) 81'
DF	22	(Spain) Iván Fresneda		(substituted on) 67'
DF	25	(Portugal) Gonçalo Inácio
DF	47	(Brazil) Ricardo Esgaio
MF	50	(Portugal) Alexandre Brito
MF	96	(Portugal) Samuel Justo
FW	19	(Denmark) Conrad Harder		(substituted on) 81'
FW	90	(Portugal) Afonso Moreira
Manager:
(Portugal) Rui Borges

GK	1	(Ukraine) Anatoliy Trubin
RB	44	(Portugal) Tomás Araújo		(substituted off) 72'
CB	30	(Argentina) Nicolás Otamendi (c)
CB	4	(Portugal) António Silva
LB	3	(Spain) Álvaro Carreras	(yellow card) 58'
CM	10	(Turkey) Orkun Kökçü		(substituted off) 83'
CM	61	(Portugal) Florentino Luís
RW	11	(Argentina) Ángel Di María
AM	8	(Norway) Fredrik Aursnes		(substituted off) 72'
LW	21	(Norway) Andreas Schjelderup		(substituted off) 46'
CF	14	(Greece) Vangelis Pavlidis		(substituted off) 80'
Substitutes:
GK	24	(Portugal) Samuel Soares
DF	5	(Albania) Adrian Bajrami
DF	6	(Denmark) Alexander Bah		(substituted on) 72'
MF	18	(Luxembourg) Leandro Barreiro		(substituted on) 72'
MF	64	(Portugal) João Rego
MF	85	(Portugal) Renato Sanches		(substituted on) 80'
FW	7	(Switzerland) Zeki Amdouni		(substituted on) 80'
FW	9	(Brazil) Arthur Cabral
FW	17	(Turkey) Kerem Aktürkoğlu		(substituted on) 46'
Manager:
(Portugal) Bruno Lage

Man of the Match:
Florentino Luís (Benfica)

Assistant referees:
Bruno Jesus
Pedro Ribeiro
Fourth official:
João Gonçalves
Video assistant referee:
Luís Godinho
Assistant video assistant referee:
Luís Ferreira
Nuno Manso

Match rules

- 90 minutes.
- Penalty shoot-out if scores still level.
- Seven named substitutes.
- Maximum of three substitutions.

== See also ==
- Derby de Lisboa
- 2024–25 S.L. Benfica season
- 2024–25 Sporting CP season
- 2025 Taça de Portugal final
