= 2019–20 S.C. Braga season =

Braga
2019–20 season
- President: António Salvador
- Manager: Sá Pinto (until 23 December); Ruben Amorim (from 27 December until 4 March); Custódio (from 5 March until 30 June); Artur Jorge (from 1 July )
- Stadium: Estádio Municipal de Braga
- Primeira Liga: 3rd
- Taça de Portugal: Fifth round
- Taça da Liga: Winners
- UEFA Europa League: Round of 32
- Top goalscorer: League: Paulinho (17); All: Paulinho (25)
Home colours	Away colours	Third colours

The 2019–20 season was Sporting Clube de Braga's 99th season in existence and the club's 24th consecutive season in the top flight of Portuguese football. In addition to the domestic league, Braga participated in this season's editions of the Taça de Portugal, the Taça da Liga, and the UEFA Europa League. The season covered the period from 1 July 2019 to 25 July 2020.

== Players ==
=== Current squad ===
As of 7 February 2020.

Note: Flags indicate national team as defined under FIFA eligibility rules; some limited exceptions apply. Players may hold more than one non-FIFA nationality.

No.	Pos.	Nation	Player
1	GK	BRA	Matheus
3	DF	BRA	Vítor Tormena
4	DF	POR	Bruno Wilson
5	DF	POR	Nuno Sequeira
7	MF	ANG	Wilson Eduardo
9	FW	ESP	Abel Ruiz (loan from Barcelona)
11	DF	POR	Diogo Viana
12	GK	POR	Tiago Sá
13	DF	BRA	Wallace (loan from Lazio)
15	MF	POR	André Horta
17	MF	POR	João Novais
18	FW	POR	Rui Fonte

No.	Pos.	Nation	Player
20	FW	POR	Paulinho
21	FW	POR	Ricardo Horta
27	MF	BRA	Fransérgio (captain)
34	DF	BRA	Raul Silva
36	DF	BRA	Bruno Viana
47	DF	POR	Ricardo Esgaio
60	MF	POR	João Palhinha (loan from Sporting CP)
77	FW	POR	Francisco Trincão
82	GK	POR	Eduardo
90	FW	BRA	Galeno
92	DF	POR	David Carmo

=== Out on loan ===
Note: Flags indicate national team as defined under FIFA eligibility rules; some limited exceptions apply. Players may hold more than one non-FIFA nationality.

No.	Pos.	Nation	Player
—	DF	CRO	Andrej Lukić (at Sheriff Tiraspol)
—	DF	BRA	Pablo (at Rubin Kazan)
—	DF	POR	Rui Silva (at Santa Clara)
—	DF	POR	Diogo Figueiras (at Rio Ave)
—	MF	BRA	Alef (at APOEL)
—	MF	POR	Xadas (at Maritimo)

No.	Pos.	Nation	Player
—	MF	BRA	Murilo (at Sporting de Gijón)
—	MF	BRA	Ricardo Ryller (at Red Bull Bragantino)
—	FW	POR	Fábio Martins (at Famalicão)
—	FW	RSA	Luther Singh (at Moreirense)
—	FW	SRB	Nikola Stojiljković (at Boavista)
—	FW	EGY	Ahmed Hassan (at Olympiacos)

== Pre-season and friendlies ==
Win Draw Loss

16 July 2019 Friendly	Millwall	1–2	Braga	Albufeira, Portugal
19:00 WEST	O'Brien 36'		Palhinha 18'; A. Horta 72'	Stadium: Estádio da Nora

19 July 2019 Friendly	Braga	0–2	Lille	Albufeira, Portugal
20:00 CEST (UTC+2)			Rémy 45'; Leão 82'	Stadium: Estádio Municipal de Albufeira

24 July 2019 Friendly	Braga	0–0	Monaco	Braga, Portugal
21:30 CEST (UTC+2)		Report		Stadium: Estádio Municipal de Braga

31 July 2019 Friendly	Porto	1–0	Braga	Olival, Portugal
19:00 WEST	Corona 89'			Stadium: CTFD PortoGaia

== Competitions ==
Win Draw Loss Fixtures

=== Overall record ===
Competition	First match	Last match	Starting round	Final position	Record							
Competition	First match	Last match	Starting round	Final position	Pld	W	D	L	GF	GA	GD	Win %
Primeira Liga	11 August 2019	25 July 2020	Matchday 1	3rd	34	18	6	10	61	40	+21	52.94
Taça de Portugal	19 October 2019	18 December 2019	Third round	Fifth round	3	2	0	1	5	3	+2	66.67
Taça da Liga	7 October 2019	25 January 2020	Third round	Winners	5	5	0	0	12	4	+8	100.00
Europa League	8 August 2019	26 February 2020	Third qualifying round	Round of 32	12	8	2	2	27	17	+10	66.67
Total					54	33	8	13	105	64	+41	61.11

Last updated: 25 July 2020
Source: Soccerway

=== Primeira Liga ===
==== League table ====
Pos	Team	Pld	W	D	L	GF	GA	GD	Pts	Qualification or relegation
1	Porto (C)	34	26	4	4	74	22	+52	82	Qualification for the Champions League group stage
2	Benfica	34	24	5	5	71	26	+45	77	Qualification for the Champions League third qualifying round
3	Braga	34	18	6	10	61	40	+21	60 (Note: Head-to-head away goals: Braga 1, Sporting 0)	Qualification for the Europa League group stage (Note: Since the winners of the 2019–20 Taça de Portugal, Porto, qualified for the Champions League based on league position, the spot awarded to the third-placed team (Europa League third qualifying round) was passed to the fourth-placed team, and the spot awarded to the fourth-placed team (Europa League second qualifying round) was passed to the fifth-placed team.)
4	Sporting CP	34	18	6	10	49	34	+15	60	Qualification for the Europa League third qualifying round
5	Rio Ave	34	15	10	9	48	36	+12	55	Qualification for the Europa League second qualifying round

Source: Liga Portugal
Rules for classification: 1) Points; 2) Head-to-head points; 3) Head-to-head goal difference; 4) Head-to-head away goals scored; 5) Goal difference; 6) Matches won; 7) Goals scored; 8) Play-off.
(C) Champions

==== Results summary ====
Overall								Home						Away					
Pld	W	D	L	GF	GA	GD	Pts	W	D	L	GF	GA	GD	W	D	L	GF	GA	GD
34	18	6	10	61	40	+21	60	11	3	3	34	21	+13	7	3	7	27	19	+8

Last updated: 25 July 2020.
Source: Liga Portugal

==== Results by round ====
Round	1	2	3	4	5	6	7	8	9	10	11	12	13	14	15	16	17	18	19	20	21	22	23	24	25	26	27	28	29	30	31	32	33	34
Ground	H	A	A	H	A	H	A	H	A	H	A	H	A	H	A	H	A	A	H	H	A	H	A	H	A	H	A	H	A	H	A	H	A	H
Result	W	L	D	L	L	D	W	W	L	D	W	W	L	L	W	W	W	W	W	D	W	W	W	W	L	L	D	W	L	W	W	D	L	W
Position	2	9	7	13	16	16	11	8	10	10	9	6	7	8	6	5	5	5	3	4	3	3	3	3	3	3	4	4	4	4	4	4	4	3

Updated to match(es) played on 25 July 2020. Source: Liga Portugal
A = Away; H = Home; W = Win; D = Draw; L = Loss

==== Matches ====
11 August 2019 1	Braga	3–1	Moreirense	Braga
21:00 WEST (UTC+1)	Fransérgio 45+3'; Kouka 64'; Wilson 77'	Report	Nenê 90'	Stadium: Estádio Municipal de Braga; Attendance: 13,223; Referee: Fábio Veríssimo

18 August 2019 2	Sporting CP	2–1	Braga	Lisbon
21:00 WEST (UTC+1)	Wendel 16'; Fernandes 44'	Report	Eduardo 73'	Stadium: Estádio José Alvalade; Attendance: 35,692; Referee: Luis Godinho

25 August 2019 3	Gil Vicente	1–1	Braga	Barcelos
20:30 WEST (UTC+1)	Lima 77'	Report	Galeno 6'	Stadium: Estádio Cidade de Barcelos; Attendance: 6,769; Referee: Hugo Miguel

1 September 2019 4	Braga	0–4	Benfica	Braga
21:00 WEST (UTC+1)		Report	Pizzi 25', 47'; Viana 51' (o.g.); Esgaio 73' (o.g.)	Stadium: Estádio Municipal de Braga; Attendance: 15,499; Referee: Nuno Almeida

13 September 2019 5	Vitória de Setúbal	1–0	Braga	Setúbal
20:30 WEST (UTC+1)	Hachadi 74'	Report		Stadium: Estádio do Bonfim; Attendance: 3,527; Referee: Artur Soares Dias

23 September 2019 6	Braga	2–2	Marítimo	Braga
19:00 WEST (UTC+1)	Paulinho 57', 77'	Report	Maeda 32'; Bambock 70'	Stadium: Estádio Municipal de Braga; Attendance: 8,184; Referee: Manuel Oliveira

29 September 2019 7	Portimonense	0–1	Braga	Portimão
18:00 WEST (UTC+1)		Report	Paulinho 33'	Stadium: Estádio Municipal de Portimão; Attendance: 3,430; Referee: Hugo Miguel

28 October 2019 8	Braga	2–0	Santa Clara	Braga
20:15 WET (UTC±0)	Eduardo 13'; R. Horta 58'	Report		Stadium: Estádio Municipal de Braga; Attendance: 6,785; Referee: Rui Costa

31 October 2019 9	Boavista	2–0	Braga	Porto
20:15 WET (UTC±0)	Costa 6'; Mateus 90+3'	Report		Stadium: Estádio do Bessa; Attendance: 8,452; Referee: Tiago Martins

3 November 2019 10	Braga	2–2	Famalicão	Braga
20:15 WET (UTC±0)	Galeno 76', 77'	Report	Martínez 47'; Anderson 89'	Stadium: Estádio Municipal de Braga; Attendance: 9,285; Referee: Jorge Sousa

10 November 2019 11	Vitória de Guimarães	0–2	Braga	Guimarães
20:00 WET (UTC±0)		Report	Paulinho 24'; Galeno 71'	Stadium: Estádio D. Afonso Henriques; Attendance: 24,429; Referee: Hugo Miguel

2 December 2019 12	Braga	2–0	Rio Ave	Braga
18:45 WET (UTC±0)	Paulinho 41'; R. Horta 80'	Report		Stadium: Estádio Municipal de Braga; Attendance: 7,274; Referee: Nuno Almeida

7 December 2019 13	Aves	1–0	Braga	Aves
20:30 WET (UTC±0)	Mohammadi 8'	Report		Stadium: Estádio do CD Aves; Attendance: 1,632; Referee: Rui Costa

15 December 2019 14	Braga	0–1	Paços de Ferreira	Braga
20:00 WET (UTC±0)		Report	Douglas Tanque 38'	Stadium: Estádio Municipal de Braga; Attendance: 5,909; Referee: Fábio Veríssimo

4 January 2020 15	Belenenses	1–7	Braga	Lisbon
18:00 WET (UTC±0)	Varela 32'	Report	R. Horta 8', 22'; Trincão 19'; Palhinha 45'; Paulinho 48'; Fonte 84', 90+1'	Stadium: Estádio do Restelo; Attendance: 3,190; Referee: Tiago Martins

12 January 2020 16	Braga	2–1	Tondela	Braga
20:00 WET (UTC±0)	Paulinho 79', 90+1'	Report	Murillo 37'	Stadium: Estádio Municipal de Braga; Attendance: 9,002; Referee: Jorge Sousa

17 January 2020 17	Porto	1–2	Braga	Porto
19:00 WET (UTC±0)	Soares 58'	Report	Fransérgio 5'; Paulinho 75'	Stadium: Estádio do Dragão; Attendance: 35,611; Referee: Carlos Xistra

29 January 2020 18	Moreirense	1–2	Braga	Moreira de Cónegos
20:15 WET (UTC±0)	Rosić 72'	Report	Trincão 7'; Fonte 9'	Stadium: Parque Joaquim de Almeida Freitas; Attendance: 1,711; Referee: Manuel Mota

2 February 2020 19	Braga	1–0	Sporting CP	Braga
WET (UTC±0)	Trincão 75'	Report		Stadium: Estádio Municipal de Braga; Attendance: 18,379; Referee: Jorge Sousa

8 February 2020 20	Braga	2–2	Gil Vicente	Braga
18:00 WET (UTC±0)	R. Horta 12'; Esgaio 22'	Report	Carvalho 65', 85'	Stadium: Estádio Municipal de Braga; Attendance: 13,633; Referee: Rui Costa

15 February 2020 21	Benfica	0–1	Braga	Lisbon
18:00 WET (UTC±0)		Report	Palhinha 45+1'	Stadium: Estádio da Luz; Attendance: 59,371; Referee: Hugo Miguel

23 February 2020 22	Braga	3–1	Vitória de Setúbal	Braga
20:00 WET (UTC±0)	R. Horta 63'; Wilson 75'; Trincão 90+7'	Report	Ghilas 89'	Stadium: Estádio Municipal de Braga; Attendance: 11,185; Referee: Hélder Malheiro

1 March 2020 23	Marítimo	1–2	Braga	Funchal
17:30 WET (UTC±0)	Correa 65'	Report	Trincão 5'; Paulinho 90+8'	Stadium: Estádio do Marítimo; Attendance: 6,530; Referee: Tiago Martins

6 March 2020 24	Braga	3–1	Portimonense	Braga
20:30 WET (UTC±0)	Trincão 30'; Silva 43'; R. Horta 47'	Report	Boa Morte 90+4'	Stadium: Estádio Municipal de Braga; Attendance: 8,684; Referee: Fábio Veríssimo

5 June 2020 25	Santa Clara	3–2	Braga	Ponta Delgada
19:00 WEST (UTC+1)	Santana 34', 66' (pen.); Carlos 90+2'	Report	Fransérgio 20' (pen.); Trincão 56'	Stadium: Estádio de São Miguel; Attendance: 0 Referee: Artur Soares Dias

13 June 2020 26	Braga	0–1	Boavista	Braga
21:00 WEST (UTC+1)		Report	Bueno 58' (pen.)	Stadium: Estádio Municipal de Braga; Attendance: 0 Referee: Luís Godinho

19 June 2020 27	Famalicão	0–0	Braga	Vila Nova de Famalicão
21:15 WEST (UTC+1)		Report		Stadium: Estádio Municipal 22 de Junho; Attendance: 0 Referee: Hugo Miguel

25 June 2020 28	Braga	3–2	Vitória de Guimarães	Braga
21:00 WEST (UTC+1)	Paulinho 1'; Trincão 42'; Galeno 65'	Report	André 15' (pen.); Bruno 35'	Stadium: Estádio Municipal de Braga; Attendance: 0 Referee: Tiago Martins

30 June 2020 29	Rio Ave	4–3	Braga	Vila do Conde
21:30 WEST (UTC+1)	Taremi 34', 90+6' (pen.); Santos 35'; Gelson 40'	Report	Paulinho 20', 80'; R. Horta 26'	Stadium: Estádio dos Arcos; Attendance: 0 Referee: Nuno Almeida

4 July 2020 30	Braga	4–0	Aves	Braga
21:30 WEST (UTC+1)	Fonte 48'; R. Horta 54'; Ruiz 83'; Paulinho 90+2'	Report		Stadium: Estádio Municipal de Braga; Attendance: 0 Referee: Manuel Mota

10 July 2020 31	Paços de Ferreira	1–5	Braga	Paços de Ferreira
21:30 WEST (UTC+1)	Zé Uilton 78'	Report	Paulinho 3', 34', 38'; R. Horta 48'; Galeno 88'	Stadium: Estádio da Mata Real; Attendance: 0 Referee: Carlos Xistra

15 July 2020 32	Braga	1–1	Belenenses	Braga
19:15 WEST (UTC+1)	R. Horta 42'	Report	Cassierra 80'	Stadium: Estádio Municipal de Braga; Attendance: 0 Referee: André Narciso

20 July 2020 33	Tondela	1–0	Braga	Tondela
19:15 WEST (UTC+1)	Tavares 74'	Report		Stadium: Estádio João Cardoso; Attendance: 0 Referee: Artur Soares Dias

25 July 2020 34	Braga	2–1	Porto	Braga
21:15 WEST (UTC+1)	R. Horta 54'; Fransérgio 66'	Report	Uribe 6'	Stadium: Estádio Municipal de Braga; Attendance: 0 Referee: Jorge Sousa

=== Taça de Portugal ===
==== Third round ====
19 October 2019	Leça	1–3	Braga	Leça da Palmeira
20:45 WEST (UTC+1)	Silva 85'		Eduardo 25', 54'; R. Horta 42'	Stadium: Estádio do Leça Futebol Clube

==== Fourth round ====
23 November 2019	Braga	1–0	Gil Vicente	Braga
18:30 WET (UTC±0)	R. Horta 8'			Stadium: Estádio Municipal de Braga

==== Fifth round ====
18 December 2019	Benfica	2–1	Braga	Lisbon
20:45 WET (UTC±0)	Pizzi 19'; Carlos Vinícius 62'		Ferro 14' (o.g.)	Stadium: Estádio da Luz; Referee: Artur Soares Dias

=== Taça da Liga ===
==== Third round ====
Pos	Team	Pld	W	D	L	GF	GA	GD	Pts	Qualification	BRA	PAÇ	MAR	PEN
1	Braga	3	3	0	0	9	3	+6	9	Advance to knockout phase	—	—	2–1	—
2	Paços de Ferreira	3	1	1	1	4	6	−2	4		1–4	—	1–1	—
3	Marítimo	3	0	2	1	2	3	−1	2		—	—	—	0–0
4	Penafiel	3	0	1	2	2	5	−3	1		1–3	1–2	—	—

Source: Liga Portugal
Rules for classification: Tiebreakers

7 October 2019 1	Penafiel	1–3	Braga	Penafiel
16:00 WEST (UTC+1)	Schons 72'	Report	Fonte 2'; Pablo 17'; R. Horta 67'	Stadium: Estádio Municipal 25 de Abril; Attendance: 1,103; Referee: Cláudio Pereira

13 October 2019 2	Braga	2–1	Marítimo	Braga
15:00 WEST (UTC+1)	A. Horta 10'; Paulinho 34'	Report	Bambock 66'	Stadium: Estádio Municipal de Braga; Attendance: 5,041; Referee: Nuno Almeida

22 December 2019 3	Paços de Ferreira	1–4	Braga	Paços de Ferreira
17:00 WET (UTC±0)	Douglas Tanque 1'	Report	Fransérgio 44'; Palhinha 51'; R. Horta 71'; Eduardo 75' (pen.)	Stadium: Estádio Capital do Móvel; Attendance: 2,472; Referee: Luís Godinho

==== Semi-finals ====
21 January 2020	Braga	2–1	Sporting CP	Braga
19:45 WET (UTC±0)	R. Horta 8'; Paulinho 90'	Report	Mathieu 44'	Stadium: Estádio Municipal de Braga; Attendance: 10,047; Referee: Nuno Almeida

==== Final ====
25 January 2020	Braga	1–0	Porto	Braga
19:45 WET (UTC±0)	R. Horta 90+5'	Report		Stadium: Estádio Municipal de Braga; Attendance: 23,794; Referee: Luís Godinho

=== UEFA Europa League ===
==== Third qualifying round ====
8 August 2019 First leg	Brøndby (Denmark)	2–4	(Portugal) Braga	Brøndbyvester, Denmark
18:30 CEST (UTC+2)	Kaiser 15', 50'	Report	Paulinho 18'; A. Horta 20'; R. Horta 90+2'; Hermannsson 90+4' (o.g.)	Stadium: Brøndby Stadium; Attendance: 15,642; Referee: Tamás Bognár (Hungary)

15 August 2019 Second leg	Braga (Portugal)	3–1 (7–3 agg.)	(Denmark) Brøndby	Braga, Portugal
19:45 WEST (UTC+1)	Palhinha 19'; A. Horta 41'; Paulinho 66'	Report	Bjur 85'	Stadium: Estadio Municipal; Attendance: 11,964; Referee: Aleksei Eskov (Russia)

==== Play-off round ====
22 August 2019 First leg	Braga (Portugal)	1–0	(Russia) Spartak Moscow	Braga, Portugal
19:45 WEST (UTC+1)	R. Horta 74'	Report		Stadium: Estadio Municipal; Attendance: 11,667; Referee: Xavier Estrada Fernández (Spain)

29 August 2019 Second leg	Spartak Moscow (Russia)	1–2 (1–3 agg.)	(Portugal) Braga	Moscow, Russia
20:15 MSK (UTC+3)	Bakayev 89'	Report	R. Horta 42', 45+3'	Stadium: Otkritie Arena; Attendance: 38,176; Referee: Davide Massa (Italy)

==== Group stage ====
Pos	Team	Pld	W	D	L	GF	GA	GD	Pts	Qualification
1	(Portugal) Braga	6	4	2	0	15	9	+6	14	Advance to knockout phase
2	(England) Wolverhampton Wanderers	6	4	1	1	11	5	+6	13	Advance to knockout phase
3	(Slovakia) Slovan Bratislava	6	1	1	4	10	13	−3	4	
4	(Turkey) Beşiktaş	6	1	0	5	6	15	−9	3	

Source: UEFA
Rules for classification: Group stage tiebreakers

19 September 2019 1	Wolverhampton Wanderers (England)	0–1	(Portugal) Braga	Wolverhampton, England
20:00 BST (UTC+1)		Report	R. Horta 71'	Stadium: Molineux Stadium; Attendance: 28,314; Referee: Jakob Kehlet (Denmark)

3 October 2019 2	Braga (Portugal)	2–2	(Slovakia) Slovan Bratislava	Braga, Portugal
17:55 WEST (UTC+1)	Viana 31'; Galeno 63'	Report	Šporar 45+4'; Viana 87' (o.g.)	Stadium: Estádio Municipal; Attendance: 9,077; Referee: Adrien Jaccottet (Switzerland)

24 October 2019 3	Beşiktaş (Turkey)	1–2	(Portugal) Braga	Istanbul, Turkey
19:55 TRT (UTC+3)	Nayir 71'	Report	R. Horta 38'; Eduardo 80'	Stadium: Vodafone Park; Attendance: 20,956; Referee: Alejandro Hernández Hernández (Spain)

7 November 2019 4	Braga (Portugal)	3–1	(Turkey) Beşiktaş	Braga, Portugal
20:00 WET (UTC±0)	Paulinho 14', 37'; Eduardo 81'	Report	Boyd 29'	Stadium: Estádio Municipal; Attendance: 8,833; Referee: Gediminas Mažeika (Lithuania)

28 November 2019 5	Braga (Portugal)	3–3	(England) Wolverhampton Wanderers	Braga, Portugal
17:55 WET (UTC±0)	A. Horta 6'; Paulinho 65'; Fransérgio 79'	Report	Jiménez 14'; Doherty 34'; Traoré 35'	Stadium: Estádio Municipal; Attendance: 12,058; Referee: Aleksei Kulbakov (Belarus)

12 December 2019 6	Slovan Bratislava (Slovakia)	2–4	(Portugal) Braga	Bratislava, Slovakia
21:00 CET (UTC+1)	Šporar 42'; Moha 70'	Report	Fonte 44'; Trincão 72'; Bozhikov 75' (o.g.); Paulinho 90+3'	Stadium: Tehelné pole Attendance: 10,856; Referee: Paweł Gil (Poland)

==== Knockout phase ====
===== Round of 32 =====
20 February 2020 First leg	Rangers (Scotland)	3–2	(Portugal) Braga	Glasgow, Scotland
21:00 GMT (UTC±0)	Hagi 67', 82'; Aribo 75'	Report	Fransérgio 11'; Ruiz 59'	Stadium: Ibrox Stadium; Attendance: 49,378; Referee: Xavier Estrada Fernández (Spain)

26 February 2020 Second leg	Braga (Portugal)	0–1 (2–4 agg.)	(Scotland) Rangers	Braga, Portugal
17:00 WET (UTC±0)		Report	Kent 61'	Stadium: Estádio Municipal; Attendance: 18,113; Referee: Andreas Ekberg (Sweden)

== Statistics ==
=== Appearances and goals ===
No.	Pos	Nat	Player	Total		Primeira Liga		Taça de Portugal		Taça da Liga		UEFA Europa League	
No.	Pos	Nat	Player	Apps	Goals	Apps	Goals	Apps	Goals	Apps	Goals	Apps	Goals
Goalkeepers
1	GK	(Brazil) BRA	Matheus	41	0	29	0	0	0	4	0	8	0
12	GK	(Portugal) POR	Tiago Sá	4	0	1	0	1	0	1	0	1	0
82	GK	(Portugal) POR	Eduardo	9	0	4	0	2	0	0	0	3	0
Defenders
3	DF	(Brazil) BRA	Vítor Tormena	9	0	4	0	0	0	2	0	1+2	0
4	DF	(Portugal) POR	Bruno Wilson	7	1	3+3	1	0	0	0	0	0+1	0
5	DF	(Portugal) POR	Nuno Sequeira	41	0	24+1	0	2	0	4	0	10	0
6	DF	(Portugal) POR	Rolando	3	0	1+2	0	0	0	0	0	0	0
11	DF	(Portugal) POR	Diogo Viana	8	0	6	0	1	0	0	0	0+1	0
34	DF	(Brazil) BRA	Raul Silva	15	1	8+3	1	0	0	2	0	2	0
36	DF	(Brazil) BRA	Bruno Viana	49	1	29	0	3	0	5	0	12	1
47	DF	(Portugal) POR	Ricardo Esgaio	49	1	28+2	1	2	0	5	0	12	0
70	DF	(Brazil) BRA	Fabino	2	0	0+2	0	0	0	0	0	0	0
81	DF	(Portugal) POR	Pedro Amador	9	0	7+2	0	0	0	0	0	0	0
92	DF	(Portugal) POR	David Carmo	19	0	16+2	0	0	0	0	0	1	0
Midfielders
15	MF	(Portugal) POR	André Horta	38	1	21+4	0	1+1	0	1+1	1	9	0
17	MF	(Portugal) POR	João Novais	38	0	11+12	0	0+1	0	3+1	0	4+6	0
27	MF	(Brazil) BRA	Fransérgio	42	7	23+3	4	2	0	4	1	9+1	2
60	MF	(Portugal) POR	João Palhinha	44	5	24+3	3	2	0	4	1	11	1
85	MF	(Portugal) POR	Samuel Costa	1	0	0+1	0	0	0	0	0	0	0
Forwards
9	FW	(Spain) ESP	Abel Ruiz	8	2	0+6	1	0	0	0	0	1+1	1
18	FW	(Portugal) POR	Rui Fonte	37	6	6+19	4	2+1	0	2+2	1	1+4	1
20	FW	(Portugal) POR	Paulinho	48	25	27+2	17	1+2	0	4	2	11+1	6
21	FW	(Portugal) POR	Ricardo Horta	52	24	31+2	12	3	2	5	4	10+1	6
77	FW	(Portugal) POR	Francisco Trincão	40	9	17+10	8	2+1	0	1+2	0	3+4	1
89	FW	(Portugal) POR	Leandro Sanca	2	0	0+2	0	0	0	0	0	0	0
90	FW	(Brazil) BRA	Galeno	41	7	16+11	6	1	0	4	0	5+4	1
Players who have made an appearance this season but have left the club
6	MF	(Brazil) BRA	Claudemir	7	0	4+1	0	1	0	0+1	0	0	0
7	MF	(Angola) ANG	Wilson Eduardo	30	8	6+12	3	2+1	2	0+2	1	4+3	2
9	FW	(Egypt) EGY	Ahmed Hassan	7	1	4+2	1	0	0	0	0	0+1	0
8	MF	(Nigeria) NGR	Uche Agbo	6	0	0+1	0	1	0	0+2	0	1+1	0
10	MF	(Portugal) POR	Xadas	3	0	0+1	0	0	0	0+1	0	0+1	0
13	DF	(Brazil) BRA	Wallace	16	0	8	0	3	0	1+1	0	3	0
14	DF	(Brazil) BRA	Pablo	20	1	9+1	0	0	0	2	1	7+1	0
19	FW	(Brazil) BRA	Murilo	14	0	4+3	0	0+1	0	0+2	0	1+3	0
95	DF	(Brazil) BRA	Caju	6	0	1+1	0	1	0	1	0	2	0

- Last updated: 25 July 2020
- Source: soccerway
