= José Tavares =

José Tavares may refer to:

- Jose Antonio Morato Tavares (born 1960), Indonesian diplomat
- José Tavares (politician) (1949-2021), Brazilian politician
- José Tavares (footballer) (born 1966), Portuguese football midfielder
- José Tavares (football manager) (born 1980), Portuguese football manager

== See also ==
- José Tabares (born 1978), Argentine football striker
