= Custódio =

Custódio or Custodio is both a given name and surname of Portuguese origin. Notable people with the name include:

== Given name ==
- Custódio Castro (born 1983), Portuguese football midfielder
- Custodio Dos Reis (1922–1959), French road bicycle racer
- Custódio Ezequiel (born 1962), Portuguese sport shooter
- Custodio García Rovira (1780–1816), Neogranadine general, statesman and painter
- Custódio José de Melo (1840–1902), Brazilian naval officer and politician
- Custódio Muchate (born 1982), Mozambican basketball player
- Custódio Alvim Pereira (1915–2006), Portuguese clergyman, Archbishop of Lourenço Marques in Mozambique
- Custódio Pinto (1942–2004), Portuguese footballer

== Surname ==
- Adriano Tomás Custodio Mendes (born 1961), Cape Verdean footballer of Portuguese nationality
- Ana María Custodio (1908–1976), Spanish film actress
- Bonbon Custodio (born 1982), Filipino basketball player
- Denílson Custódio Machado (born 1943), Brazilian football defensive midfielder and manager
- Maestro Custodio (14th-century), Benedictine monk living in the city of Oviedo in Asturias, Spain
- Mário Custódio Nazaré (born 1976), Brazilian footballer
- Olivier Custodio (born 1995), Swiss football midfielder
- Olga E. Custodio (born 1954), United States Air Force officer
