= Viktor Gyökeres =

Swedish footballer (born 1998)

- Gyökeres playing for Sweden in 2026

Personal information
- Full name: Viktor Einar Gyökeres
- Date of birth: 4 June 1998 (age 28)
- Place of birth: Stockholm, Sweden
- Height: 1.89 m (6 ft 2 in)
- Position: Striker

Team information
- Current team: Arsenal
- Number: 14

Youth career
- 2004–2013: IFK Aspudden-Tellus (Note: IFK Aspudden merged with IK Tellus to become IFK Aspudden-Tellus in 2012)
- 2013–2015: IF Brommapojkarna

Senior career*
Years	Team	Apps	(Gls)
2015–2017	IF Brommapojkarna	56	(20)
2018–2021	Brighton & Hove Albion	0	(0)
2019–2020	→ St. Pauli (loan)	26	(7)
2020–2021	→ Swansea City (loan)	11	(0)
2021	→ Coventry City (loan)	19	(3)
2021–2023	Coventry City	91	(38)
2023–2025	Sporting CP	66	(68)
2025–	Arsenal	44	(14)

International career^{‡}
2015–2018	Sweden U19	18	(10)
2019–2020	Sweden U21	8	(4)
2019–	Sweden	43	(27)
- * Club domestic league appearances and goals as of 19:43, 21 November 2026 (UTC) ‡ National team caps and goals as of 17 November 2026

Viktor Einar Gyökeres (Swedish: [ˈvɪ̌kːtɔr ˈjø̂ːkɛrɛs]; born 4 June 1998) is a Swedish professional footballer who plays as a striker for Premier League club Arsenal and the Sweden national team.

Gyökeres began his professional career with Brommapojkarna in 2015, making over fifty appearances before joining Brighton & Hove Albion in 2018. He spent successive seasons on loan at St. Pauli, Swansea City, and Coventry City, joining the latter permanently in 2021.

Sporting CP signed Gyökeres in 2023 in a club-record transfer worth an initial €20 million. With them, he won two back-to-back Primeira Liga titles in 2024 and 2025, winning the Bola de Prata twice as the league's top scorer, the Player of the Year award in both seasons and the Gerd Müller Trophy, in his second season, given to the highest-scoring footballer in the previous season. In July 2025, he signed for Arsenal in a transfer worth €63.5 million (£54.8 million), winning the Premier League title in his first season as the club's top scorer.

Gyökeres represented Sweden at under-19 and under-21 levels. He made his first appearance for the senior team in January 2019, and was part of the squads for UEFA Euro 2020 and the 2026 FIFA World Cup.

== Club career ==
=== IFK Aspudden-Tellus ===
Born and raised in Stockholm, Gyökeres started playing football at the age of five with local club IFK Aspudden-Tellus.

=== IF Brommapojkarna ===
Gyökeres signed for Brommapojkarna from IFK Aspudden-Tellus in 2013, at the age of 14. He progressed through the youth teams and made his senior debut two years later. He scored his first goals for the club on 20 August 2015, netting a brace in a 3–0 Svenska Cupen win over IF Sylvia. The following year, with the club having suffered relegation the season before, Gyökeres scored seven goals to help Brommapojkarna secure promotion back into the Superettan. He later helped Brommapojkarna into the semi-finals of the Svenska Cupen when he scored the winning goal in the quarter finals against top division side, Elfsborg. Brommapojkarna were unable to progress further, though, as they were beaten 4–0 by IFK Norrköping in the next round.

On 6 September 2017, having scored 10 league goals at the time, Gyökeres signed a two-and-a-half-year contract with Premier League side Brighton & Hove Albion with the deal to go through at the conclusion of the Superettan season. He ended the season with a return of 13 goals in 29 league appearances, including a hat-trick on the final day as Brommapojkarna secured promotion to the Allsvenskan as league champions.

=== Brighton & Hove Albion ===
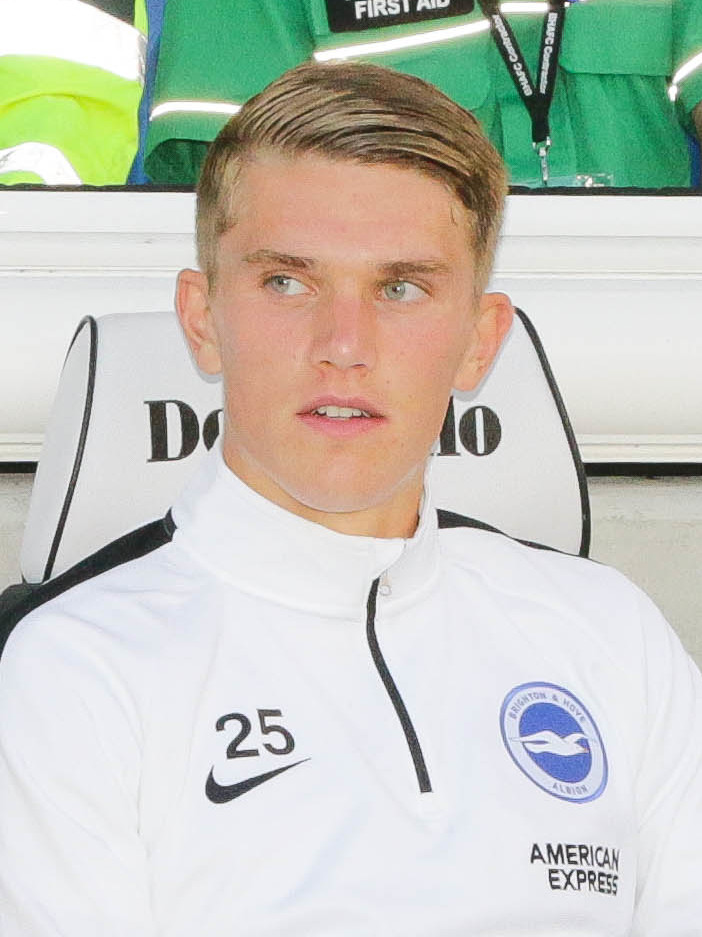
Gyökeres with Brighton & Hove Albion in 2018

Gyökeres officially joined Brighton on 1 January 2018 and began training with the club's under-23 side. He made his senior debut for the club on 28 August, starting in a 1–0 EFL Cup defeat to Southampton. On 26 January 2019, Gyökeres made his FA Cup debut coming on as a sub in a 0–0 draw at home to West Bromwich Albion.

In July 2019, he moved on loan to German second-tier side St. Pauli for the 2019–20 season. On the opening day of the season he made his debut coming on as a sub in a 1–1 away draw to Arminia. Gyökeres scored his first goal for St Pauli on 29 September scoring the second in a 2–0 home victory over SV Sandhausen.

On 17 September 2020, Gyökeres scored his first goal for Brighton in a 4–0 victory against Portsmouth in the EFL Cup. On 2 October 2020, Gyökeres joined EFL Championship side Swansea City on loan for the remainder of the 2020–21 season. He made his debut a day later, coming on as a substitute in a 2–1 home win over Millwall. He scored his first goal for the club on 9 January 2021, scoring the second in a 2–0 away win over Stevenage sending Swansea through to the fourth round of the FA Cup. He was recalled by Brighton on 14 January 2021.

=== Coventry City ===
Gyökeres joined Coventry City on loan on 15 January 2021. He made his debut four days later starting and playing 59 minutes of the 3–0 away loss at Reading. He scored on his first appearance at St Andrew's netting the first in an eventual 2–0 victory over Sheffield Wednesday on 27 January, his first league goal in English football.

He returned to Coventry City on a permanent deal on 9 July 2021, after signing a three-year contract. Gyökeres scored in Coventry's opening game of the 2021–22 Championship season on 8 August, putting Coventry back level in an eventual 2–1 victory over Nottingham Forest in Coventry's first home game since April 2019 after ground sharing with Birmingham City. Gyökeres scored 17 goals in 45 league appearances for Coventry in the 2021–22 season.

In the 2022–23 Championship season, he was named as the player of the month in November after scoring four goals in four games, leading Coventry to four straight wins during that period. Three goals and three assists saw him win the award for a second time in March 2023. Overall he scored 21 goals in 46 appearances, making him the second highest scorer in the league that year. Coventry finished 5th in the table and narrowly missed out on promotion when they lost the Playoff Final on penalties to Luton Town. Gyökeres scored his penalty.

=== Sporting CP ===
On 13 July 2023, Gyökeres signed a five-year contract with Primeira Liga side Sporting CP, who paid a club record transfer fee of €20 million (plus €4 million in bonuses) for him. Coventry are also entitled to payment of 10–15% from a future transfer, and the release clause was set at €100 million.

==== 2023–24: Primeira Liga title, Bola de Prata and Player of the Year ====
On 12 August, he made his debut for the club, starting and scoring twice in a 3–2 league victory at home to Vizela. On 21 September, Gyökeres made his debut in European competitions, starting and scoring in a 2–1 victory away at Sturm Graz, in the UEFA Europa League group stage. On 26 October, he was shown the first ever red card of his club career, seven minutes into Sporting CP's visit to Raków Częstochowa in a UEFA Europa League group stage match. On 2 November, on his Taça da Liga debut, Gyökeres scored a hat-trick in a 4–2 home victory over Farense. Ten days later, he scored in a 2–1 league loss away at local rivals Benfica. On 26 November, in his Taça de Portugal debut, Gyökeres came on as a second-half substitute and scored Sporting's last goal in an 8–0 home rout over Campeonato de Portugal side Dumiense. On 19 December, he scored and made an assist in a 2–0 league victory at home to rivals Porto.

On 5 January 2024, Gyökeres provided four assists in a 5–1 league victory at home to Estoril. On 17 March, he scored his first Primeira Liga hat-trick in a 6–1 victory over Boavista. Between September and January, Gyökeres scored thirteen goals and provided six assists, being named the league's Player of the Month and Forward of the Month for five consecutive months. On 29 April, with Sporting two goals down, he scored a brace in the 87th and 88th minutes in a 2–2 draw away against Porto at the Estádio do Dragão to ensure Sporting stayed on top of the league table, five points ahead of rivals Benfica. At the end of the month, Gyökeres was again named the league's Player of the Month and Forward of the Month.

On 5 May, Sporting mathematically secured their 20th Primeira Liga title, following Benfica's defeat to Famalicão, and Gyökeres won the Bola de Prata award, after he finished his first season at the club as the Primeira Liga Top scorer with 29 goals, scoring a brace on Sporting's final league match of the season, against Chaves on 18 May, to become the second Swedish player to win the top scorer award after Mats Magnusson in 1989–90. He was also named the best player of the Primeira Liga and was included in the Best XI. On 28 May, two days after his appearance for the club in the Portuguese Cup final, Gyökeres underwent surgery on his left knee in Lisbon.

==== 2024–25: Second consecutive league title, top scorer and departure ====
Gyökeres made his return from injury on 3 August 2024, assisting twice in the 4–3 loss to rivals Porto in the 2024 Supertaça Cândido de Oliveira. He scored seven times in the four league matches that month, including a hat-trick in a 5–0 win away to Farense on 23 August. In the process, he became the league highest top scorer in the 21st century, after four matchweeks. Gyökeres also earned the league's Player of the Month and Forward of the Month awards for the month of August. On 17 September, in his UEFA Champions League debut, he also scored his first goal in the competition, opening the scoring in their 2–0 victory over Lille, being awarded man of the match, during the inaugural matchday of the newly formatted Champions League league phase.

On 1 November, Gyökeres scored four goals in a single match during a 5–1 rout against Farense, with his first-half hat-trick tying Beto Acosta's feat reached in the 2000–01 campaign. Four days later, he became the second Swedish player (after Zlatan Ibrahimović) and the first Sporting player to score a hat-trick in the Champions League era in a 4–1 victory over Manchester City. On 16 December, he was awarded the Golden Ball (Guldbollen), the annual award for best Swedish footballer in 2024. On 11 January 2025, he scored a penalty in the Taça da Liga final, which Sporting eventually lost on penalties following extra time. By the end of the month, Gyökeres suffered a hamstring injury, leading him to start only one league match during the months of January and February, and missing some crucial games including their final Champions League league phase match against Bologna and the knockout phase play-offs against Borussia Dortmund, which Sporting ended up losing 3–0 on aggregate.

On 3 March, Gyökeres scored twice in a 3–1 league victory against Estoril, and with those goals, he became the first player to have scored against every Primeira Liga team, he has faced in a single season. After two months, he fully recovered from his injury, six days later, adding another brace against Casa Pia by the same scoreline. Hours before the match, it was reported that he made a gentlemen's agreement with Sporting president Frederico Varandas that would allow him to leave in the summer. At the end of the month, Gyökeres was named the Primeira Liga Player of the Month. On 27 April, he scored four goals – his second time that season – in a 5–0 league win over Boavista. With his four goals, Gyökeres leapfrogged Bas Dost's 93 goals to become the second-highest all-time foreign goalscorer in Sporting's history. He also became the first player to score more than 35 goals in the Primeira Liga since Mário Jardel in the 2001–02 season.

On 10 May, in his 100th appearance for Sporting, he assisted Francisco Trincão's goal in a draw against Benfica in the Lisbon derby, which secured Sporting's spot at the top of the league table. Seven days later, he scored the winning goal in a 2–0 victory over Vitória de Guimarães as Sporting won the league; this was Gyökeres's second consecutive Primeira League title. With 39 goals scored, he finished the season as the Primeira Liga top scorer – for the second consecutive season – also winning his second Bola de Prata and the league's Player of the Year awards. On 25 May, in the Taça de Portugal final against Benfica, he scored from the penalty spot in the 11th minute of added time, to tie the game 1–1 and send it to extra time. Sporting eventually won the match 3–1, winning their first domestic double since the 2001–02 season.

Following the end of the season, Frederico Varandas confirmed that Gyökeres could leave the club for less than his contractual release clause, as the player was linked with a transfer to the Premier League.

=== Arsenal ===
In late June, Arsenal made an initial bid of €55 million plus €10 million in bonuses, which was rejected. The clubs continued negotiations in July, with Gyökeres sacrificing part of his salary to facilitate the transfer. After Sporting rejected another bid, he failed to turn up to training for the pre-season, leading him to be disciplined by the club. On 14 July, it was reported that the two clubs had agreed a deal in principle for, with his agent also waiving his fee of the transfer to help facilitate the deal. The transfer was delayed due to issues with add-ons to the deal. On 25 July, it was reported that Gyökeres was to undergo a medical at Arsenal after being given permission to travel to England by Sporting.

The following day, Gyökeres signed for Arsenal for a fee of £55 million, potentially rising to £63.5 million with add-ons, signing a five-year deal with the club. He said he wanted to join the club after losing to them with Sporting the previous season. After his signing, some analysts and pundits, such as Rio Ferdinand, questioned if Gyökeres would be successful for Arsenal, due to previous goal scoring struggles for other formerly prolific forwards moving from the Primeira Liga to the Premier League (such as Mário Jardel), and Gyökeres' previous struggle to break into the first team at Brighton. On 27 July, Gyökeres was unveiled as an Arsenal player before a pre-season game against Newcastle United in Singapore. After being given squad number 14, previously worn by Thierry Henry (Arsenal's all-time leading goalscorer), Gyökeres said that he did not want to be compared to Henry.

==== 2025–26: Debut season and Premier League title ====
Following pre-season, Arsenal manager Mikel Arteta said that Gyökeres "will be 100% or more" ready for the opening game of the season. On 17 August, he started in the opening game at Manchester United as Arsenal won 1–0, but he was subbed off in favor of Kai Havertz after just under an hour of play after failing to make much of an impact. However, in the following match against newly promoted Leeds United, he scored a brace, one of which was a penalty, as Arsenal defeated Leeds 5–0. In September, Gyökeres won the Gerd Müller Trophy, part of the Ballon d'Or Awards show, for scoring the most goals, 63 in total, for both European clubs and national teams, the previous season. After his first 10 Arsenal games, he had scored 3 goals, all of which came in his first 4 games. On 21 October, Gyökeres scored two goals in a 4–0 win against Atlético Madrid in the Champions League league stage, opening up his European account for Arsenal and ending the goal drought. On 1 November, he scored in a 2–0 win against Burnley, but suffered a hamstring injury later on in that game. After being sidelined for nearly a month, Gyökeres returned from injury on 30 November, coming on as a substitute against Chelsea.

In February 2026, Gyökeres was described by the BBC as "one of the Premier League's most in-form players", being the top scorer in the Premier League in the 2026 calendar year. In early May 2026, he scored his 20th goal of the season, the first time an Arsenal player had reached that tally in their debut season since Alexis Sánchez in the 2014–15 season, with Arsenal winning the 2025–26 Premier League title a few weeks later.

== International career ==
=== Youth ===
Gyökeres played youth football for Sweden at under-19 and under-21 level. Gyökeres featured regularly for Sweden in the nation's qualification campaign for the 2017 UEFA European Under-19 Championship during which he scored twice, including the winning goal against Italy to help Sweden qualify for the tournament for the first time. He was then selected for the squad which took part in the tournament in Georgia and scored in all three of Sweden's group matches but was unable to help the nation progress to the knockout stages of the tournament. His return of three goals later saw him share the Golden Boot award with England's Ben Brereton and Ryan Sessegnon, and the Netherlands' Joël Piroe.

=== Senior ===
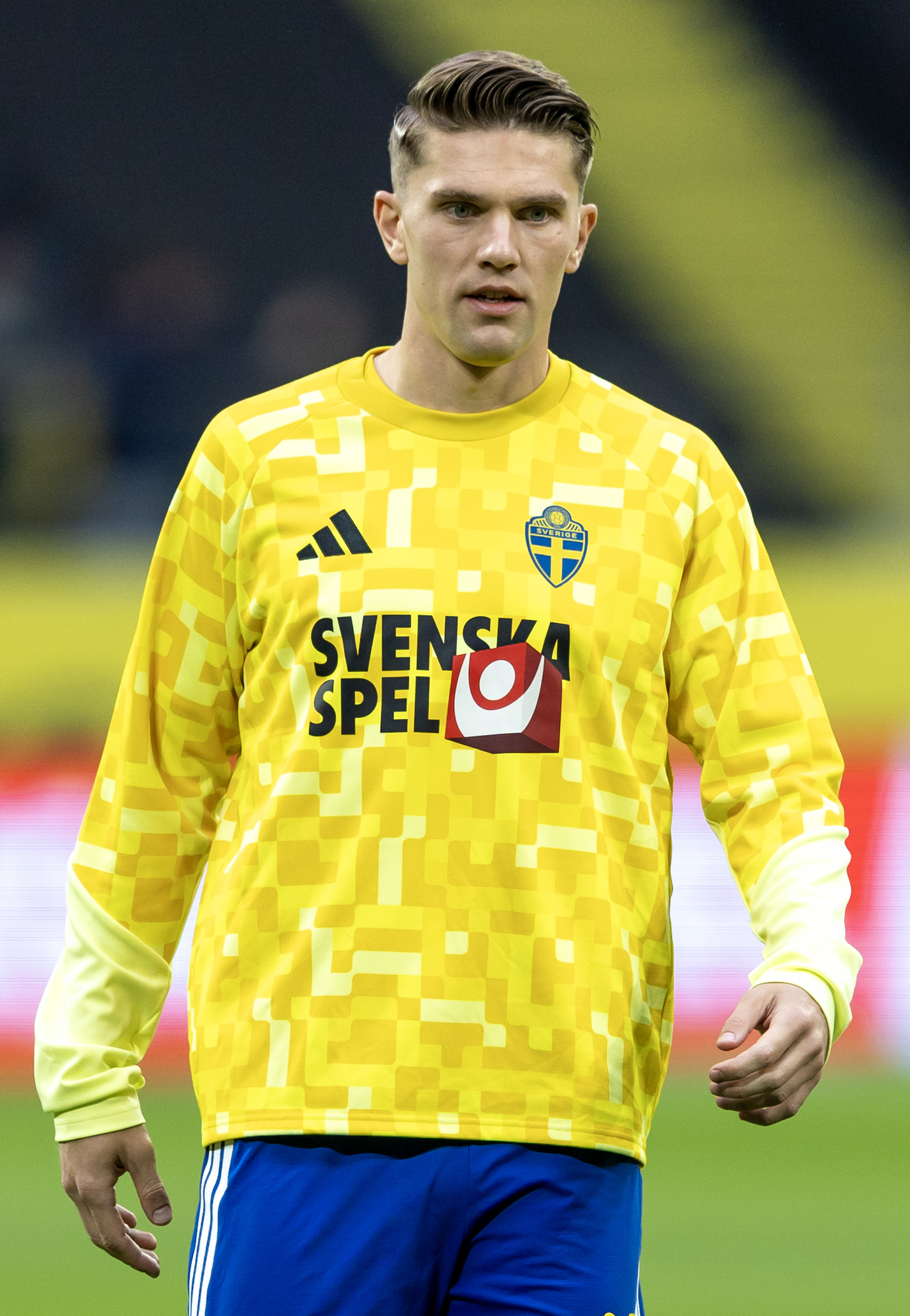
Gyökeres with Sweden in 2026

On 8 January 2019, Gyökeres made his senior international debut for Sweden in a 1–0 loss against Finland. Three days later, Gyökeres scored his first senior goal for Sweden in a 2–2 draw against Iceland. In October 2021, after scoring nine goals in 11 EFL Championship games for Coventry, Gyökeres was called up to the Sweden national team to replace Zlatan Ibrahimović for the 2022 World Cup qualifying matches against Kosovo and Greece. On 16 October 2023, Gyökeres had given Sweden a 15th-minute lead before Romelu Lukaku equalised in an away game against Belgium, when the UEFA Euro 2024 qualifier was abandoned at half-time following an Islamist-related fatal shooting in Brussels that targeted and killed two Swedes outside the stadium.

On 16 November 2024, he scored the first goal in a 2–1 victory against Slovakia, helping Sweden clinch promotion to League B of the UEFA Nations League. Three days later, Gyökeres scored four goals in a 6–0 Nations League home win over Azerbaijan, completing his first international hat-trick in the process.

On 26 March 2026, Gyökeres scored a hat-trick when Sweden beat Ukraine 3–1 in a 2026 FIFA World Cup play-off semi-final. Five days later, on 31 March, Gyökeres would score the winning goal in a 3–2 victory over Poland in the World Cup qualifying playoff final, returning Sweden to the World Cup after failing to qualify for 2022 edition of the tournament.

In May 2026, he was named in the Sweden squad for the 2026 FIFA World Cup by head coach Graham Potter. In the team's opener against Tunisia, he scored to make it 3–1 in an eventual 5–1 victory.

Gyökeres scored in four consecutive Nations League games in September and October 2026, taking him to 25 international goals and drawing him just outside Sweden's all time top 10 goalscorers.

== Player profile ==
=== Style of play ===
Gyökeres is known for his physicality, pace, and stamina, using his acceleration to exploit space behind defenders and his strength to act as a target man in aerial duels and ground battles. He excels in both aerial duels and on the ground, using his strength and size to shield the ball and link play, often contributing by running the channels or delivering crosses, while also being capable of creating chances through sharp turns and flicks in one-on-one situations. His pressing ability helps him disrupt opposition build-up and force defensive mistakes, helping also in set-piece situations.

At Sporting CP's 3–4–3 formation, he played as the central striker positioned at the highest point in the attack to lead the offensive line. He often makes runs into the box and uses his physical presence to challenge defenders, pulling them out of position to create space for the wide forwards. Gyökeres also drifts into the wings or half-spaces to help stretch the opposition's defense. His link-up play involves holding the ball and distributing it to teammates, creating opportunities through his movement and positioning.

=== Goal celebration ===
Gyökeres celebrates his goals by crossing both of his hands over his mouth; his former Coventry City teammate Josh Eccles said: "I think the celebration is because of the character in the film [Hannibal Lecter]. He eats people and Viktor destroys defences." According to Swedish newspaper Aftonbladet in November 2023, Gyökeres said: "There were lots of guesses... It was this [Hannibal Lecter] and Batman and everything possible, but nobody got it right. No one came close. Yes, it's a secret. I can clarify that, but not today."

On 18 December 2023, in an interview for Sport TV after a 2–0 league victory at home to rivals Porto, he was questioned about his usual goal celebration and answered: "I thought you'd ask me sooner. I've been here for a few months and no one has asked me that question... I'll tell you after the season if we win the league... no problem." In June 2024, the Portuguese media claimed the goal celebrations were inspired by Bane, a comics character, after Gyökeres had posted on Instagram a phrase attributed to Bane.

== Personal life ==
Gyökeres is of Hungarian descent through his paternal grandfather who emigrated to Sweden, and is a dual citizen of Hungary and Sweden. His father Stefan Gyökeres played football for IFK Östersund and Stugun in the 1980s and 1990s.

Broadcaster CMTV reported in January 2024 that Gyökeres was in a relationship with Portuguese actress Inês Aguiar. He was formerly in a relationship with fellow professional footballer Amanda Nildén, whom he met in high school, and who joined the Brighton women's team when Gyökeres moved to the club in 2018.

== Career statistics ==
=== Club ===
As of match played 21 November 2026

Appearances and goals by club, season and competition
Club	Season	League			National cup (Note: Includes Svenska Cupen, FA Cup, DFB-Pokal, Taça de Portugal)		League cup (Note: Includes EFL Cup, Taça da Liga)		Europe		Other		Total	
Club	Season	Division	Apps	Goals	Apps	Goals	Apps	Goals	Apps	Goals	Apps	Goals	Apps	Goals
Brommapojkarna	2015	Superettan	8	0	4	3	—		—		—		12	3
Brommapojkarna	2016	Division 1	19	7	6	2	—		—		—		25	9
Brommapojkarna	2017	Superettan	29	13	1	0	—		—		—		30	13
Brommapojkarna	Total		56	20	11	5	—		—		—		67	25
Brighton & Hove Albion U21	2018–19	—			—		—		—		3 (Note: Appearances in EFL Trophy)	0	3	0
Brighton & Hove Albion	2017–18	Premier League	0	0	0	0	0	0	—		—		0	0
Brighton & Hove Albion	2018–19	Premier League	0	0	4	0	1	0	—		—		5	0
Brighton & Hove Albion	2019–20	Premier League	0	0	0	0	0	0	—		—		0	0
Brighton & Hove Albion	2020–21	Premier League	0	0	0	0	3	1	—		—		3	1
Brighton & Hove Albion	Total		0	0	4	0	4	1	—		—		8	1
FC St. Pauli (loan)	2019–20	2. Bundesliga	26	7	2	0	—		—		—		28	7
Swansea City (loan)	2020–21	Championship	11	0	1	1	—		—		—		12	1
Coventry City (loan)	2020–21	Championship	19	3	—		—		—		—		19	3
Coventry City	2021–22	Championship	45	17	2	1	0	0	—		—		47	18
Coventry City	2022–23	Championship	46	21	1	1	0	0	—		3 (Note: Appearances in Championship play-offs)	0	50	22
Coventry City	Total		91	38	3	2	0	0	—		3	0	97	40
Sporting CP	2023–24	Primeira Liga	33	29	6	6	2	3	9 (Note: Appearances in UEFA Europa League)	5	—		50	43
Sporting CP	2024–25	Primeira Liga	33	39	7	5	3	4	8 (Note: Appearances in UEFA Champions League)	6	1 (Note: Appearance in Supertaça Cândido de Oliveira)	0	52	54
Sporting CP	Total		66	68	13	11	5	7	17	11	1	0	102	97
Arsenal	2025–26	Premier League	36	14	2	1	4	1	13	5	—		55	21
Arsenal	2026–27	Premier League	8	0	0	0	2	1	4	1	1 (Note: Appearance in FA Community Shield)	0	15	2
Arsenal	Total		44	14	2	1	6	2	17	6	1	0	70	23
Career total			313	150	36	20	15	10	34	17	8	0	406	197

=== International ===
As of match played 17 November 2026

Appearances and goals by national team and year
National team	Year	Apps	Goals
Sweden	2019	2	1
Sweden	2020	0	0
Sweden	2021	2	0
Sweden	2022	7	1
Sweden	2023	8	3
Sweden	2024	7	10
Sweden	2025	4	0
Sweden	2026	13	12
Total		43	27

Scores and results list Sweden's goal tally first, score column indicates score after each Gyökeres goal.

List of international goals scored by Viktor Gyökeres
No.	Date	Venue	Cap	Opponent	Score	Result	Competition	Ref.
1	11 January 2019	Khalifa International Stadium, Doha, Qatar	2	Iceland	1–1	2–2	Friendly	
2	12 June 2022	Ullevaal Stadion, Oslo, Norway	7	Norway	2–3	2–3	2022–23 UEFA Nations League B	
3	27 March 2023	Friends Arena, Solna, Sweden	13	Azerbaijan	3–0	5–0	UEFA Euro 2024 qualifying	
4	9 September 2023	Lilleküla Stadium, Tallinn, Estonia	15	Estonia	1–0	5–0	UEFA Euro 2024 qualifying	
5	16 October 2023	King Baudouin Stadium, Brussels, Belgium	17	Belgium	1–0	1–1 (Note: Sweden's Euro 2024 qualifying match away to Belgium was abandoned at half-time with the score 1–1 due to security reasons, after two Swedish supporters were killed in a terrorist shooting in Brussels. On 19 October 2023, UEFA decided that the half-time score would be considered final and the match would not be resumed.)	UEFA Euro 2024 qualifying	
6	21 March 2024	Estádio D. Afonso Henriques, Guimarães, Portugal	20	Portugal	1–4	2–5	Friendly	
7	5 September 2024	Tofiq Bahramov Republican Stadium, Baku, Azerbaijan	21	Azerbaijan	3–0	3–1	2024–25 UEFA Nations League C	
8	8 September 2024	Strawberry Arena, Solna, Sweden	22	Estonia	1–0	3–0	2024–25 UEFA Nations League C	
9	8 September 2024	Strawberry Arena, Solna, Sweden	22	Estonia	3–0	3–0	2024–25 UEFA Nations League C	
10	14 October 2024	Lilleküla Stadium, Tallinn, Estonia	24	Estonia	3–0	3–0	2024–25 UEFA Nations League C	
11	16 November 2024	Strawberry Arena, Solna, Sweden	25	Slovakia	1–0	2–1	2024–25 UEFA Nations League C	
12	19 November 2024	Strawberry Arena, Solna, Sweden	26	Azerbaijan	2–0	6–0	2024–25 UEFA Nations League C	
13	19 November 2024	Strawberry Arena, Solna, Sweden	26	Azerbaijan	3–0	6–0	2024–25 UEFA Nations League C	
14	19 November 2024	Strawberry Arena, Solna, Sweden	26	Azerbaijan	5–0	6–0	2024–25 UEFA Nations League C	
15	19 November 2024	Strawberry Arena, Solna, Sweden	26	Azerbaijan	6–0	6–0	2024–25 UEFA Nations League C	
16	26 March 2026	Estadi Ciutat de València, Valencia, Spain	31	Ukraine	1–0	3–1	2026 FIFA World Cup qualification	
17	26 March 2026	Estadi Ciutat de València, Valencia, Spain	31	Ukraine	2–0	3–1	2026 FIFA World Cup qualification	
18	26 March 2026	Estadi Ciutat de València, Valencia, Spain	31	Ukraine	3–0	3–1	2026 FIFA World Cup qualification	
19	31 March 2026	Strawberry Arena, Solna, Sweden	32	Poland	3–2	3–2	2026 FIFA World Cup qualification	
20	4 June 2026	Strawberry Arena, Solna, Sweden	33	Greece	1–1	2–2	Friendly	
21	14 June 2026	Estadio BBVA, Guadelupe, Mexico	34	Tunisia	3–1	5–1	2026 FIFA World Cup	
22	25 September 2026	Strawberry Arena, Solna, Sweden	38	Romania	2–1	2–1	2026–27 UEFA Nations League B	
23	28 September 2026	Strawberry Arena, Solna, Sweden	39	Poland	3–1	3–1	2026–27 UEFA Nations League B	
24	2 October 2026	Bilino Polje Stadium, Zenica, Bosnia and Herzegovina	40	Bosnia and Herzegovina	1–0	1–1	2026–27 UEFA Nations League B	
25	5 October 2026	Arena Națională, Bucharest, Romania	41	Romania	1–0	1–0	2026–27 UEFA Nations League B	
26	14 November 2026	Strawberry Arena, Solna, Sweden	42	Bosnia and Herzegovina	2–0	3–2	2026–27 UEFA Nations League B	
27	14 November 2026	Strawberry Arena, Solna, Sweden	42	Bosnia and Herzegovina	3–0	3–2	2026–27 UEFA Nations League B	

== Honours ==
IF Brommapojkarna

- Superettan: 2017

Sporting CP

- Primeira Liga: 2023–24, 2024–25
- Taça de Portugal: 2024–25

Arsenal

- Premier League: 2025–26
- FA Community Shield: 2026
- UEFA Champions League runner-up: 2025–26
- EFL Cup runner-up: 2025–26

Individual

- EFL Championship Team of the Season: 2022–23
- PFA Team of the Year: 2022–23 Championship
- EFL Championship Player of the Month: November 2022, March 2023
- UEFA European Under-19 Championship Golden Boot: 2017
- UEFA European Under-19 Championship Team of the Tournament: 2017
- IFFHS World's Best Top Division Goal Scorer: 2024 (36 goals)
- IFFHS World's Best Top Goal Scorer: 2024 (62 goals)
- Primeira Liga top scorer: 2023–24, 2024–25
- Primeira Liga Player of the Year: 2023–24 2024–25
- Primeira Liga Team of the Year: 2023–24, 2024–25
- Primeira Liga Player of the Month: September 2023, October/November 2023, December 2023, January 2024, April 2024, August 2024, March 2025
- Primeira Liga Forward of the Month: September 2023, October/November 2023, December 2023, January 2024, April 2024, August 2024, March 2025, April 2025
- Taça da Liga top scorer: 2024–25
- Guldbollen: 2024
- Ballon d'Or nominee: 2025
- Swedish Forward of the Year: 2023, 2024, 2025
- UEFA Nations League top scorer: 2024–25
- Gerd Müller Trophy: 2025
