= David Moreira =

Cape Verdean footballer (born 2004)

Personal information
- Full name: David Miguel Madeira Moreira
- Date of birth: 18 April 2004 (age 22)
- Place of birth: Lisbon, Portugal
- Height: 1.77 m (5 ft 10 in)
- Positions: Centre-back; left-back

Team information
- Current team: Gil Vicente
- Number: 45

Youth career
- 2011–2024: Sporting CP

Senior career*
| Years | Team | Apps | (Gls) |
| 2024–2026 | Sporting CP B | 52 | (0) |
| 2025–2026 | Sporting CP | 0 | (0) |
| 2026– | Gil Vicente | 2 | (0) |

International career^{‡}
| 2025– | Cape Verde | 3 | (0) |
- * Club domestic league appearances and goals as of 6 September 2026 ‡ National team caps and goals as of 18 November 2025

David Miguel Madeira Moreira (Portuguese: [da.ˈvid mi.ˈɡɛl mɐ.ˈdej.ɾɐ mu.ˈɾej.ɾɐ]; born 18 April 2004) is a professional footballer who plays for Primeira Liga club Gil Vicente. Born in Portugal, he represents the Cape Verde national team.

== Club career ==
Moreira joined the youth academy of Sporting CP in 2011, and worked his way up all their youth categories. On 7 June 2021, he signed his first professional contract with Sporting. On 20 June 2023, he extended his contract with the club. In 2024, he was promoted to Sporting CP B in the Liga 3.

=== Sporting CP ===
On 30 April 2025, he started training with the senior Sporting team. On 6 May 2025, he again extended his contract with Sporting until 2029. On 17 May 2025, he helped Sporting CP B earn promotion to the Liga Portugal 2. He made his senior and professional debut with the senior Sporting CP team as a substitute in the 2025 Taça de Portugal final, a 3–1 win over Benfica on 25 May 2025.

=== Gil Vicente ===
On 7 July 2026, Moreira signed a three-season contract with Gil Vicente.

== International career ==
Born in Portugal, Moreira's father was born in São Tomé and Príncipe and his mother is from Timor-Leste; his paternal grandfather is from Cape Verde. Moreira holds dual Portuguese-Cape Verdean citizenship. On 18 March 2025, he was called up to the Cape Verde national team for a set of 2026 FIFA World Cup qualification matches. He debuted with Cape Verde in a friendly 1–1 tie with Malaysia on 29 May 2025 in Kuala Lumpur.

== Career statistics ==
=== Club ===
As of match played 25 May 2025

Appearances and goals by club, season and competition
| Club | Season | League | | | Cup | | Taça da Liga | | Europe | | Other | | Total | |
| Club | Season | Division | Apps | Goals | Apps | Goals | Apps | Goals | Apps | Goals | Apps | Goals | Apps | Goals |
|---|---|---|---|---|---|---|---|---|---|---|---|---|---|---|
| Sporting CP B | 2024–25 | Liga Portugal 2 | 19 | 0 | — | | — | | — | | — | | 19 | 0 |
| Sporting CP | 2024–25 | Primeira Liga | — | | 1 | 0 | — | | — | | — | | 1 | 0 |
| Sporting CP | 2025–26 | Primeira Liga | 0 | 0 | 0 | 0 | 0 | 0 | 0 | 0 | 0 | 0 | 0 | 0 |
| Sporting CP | Total | | 0 | 0 | 1 | 0 | 0 | 0 | 0 | 0 | 0 | 0 | 1 | 0 |
| Career total | | | 19 | 0 | 1 | 0 | 0 | 0 | 0 | 0 | 0 | 0 | 20 | 0 |

=== International ===
As of match played 29 May 2025

Appearances and goals by national team and year
| National team | Year | Apps | Goals |
|---|---|---|---|
| Cape Verde | 2025 | 1 | 0 |
| Total | | 1 | 0 |

== Honours ==
Sporting CP

- Taça de Portugal: 2024–25
