= Francisco Trincão =

Portuguese footballer (born 1999)

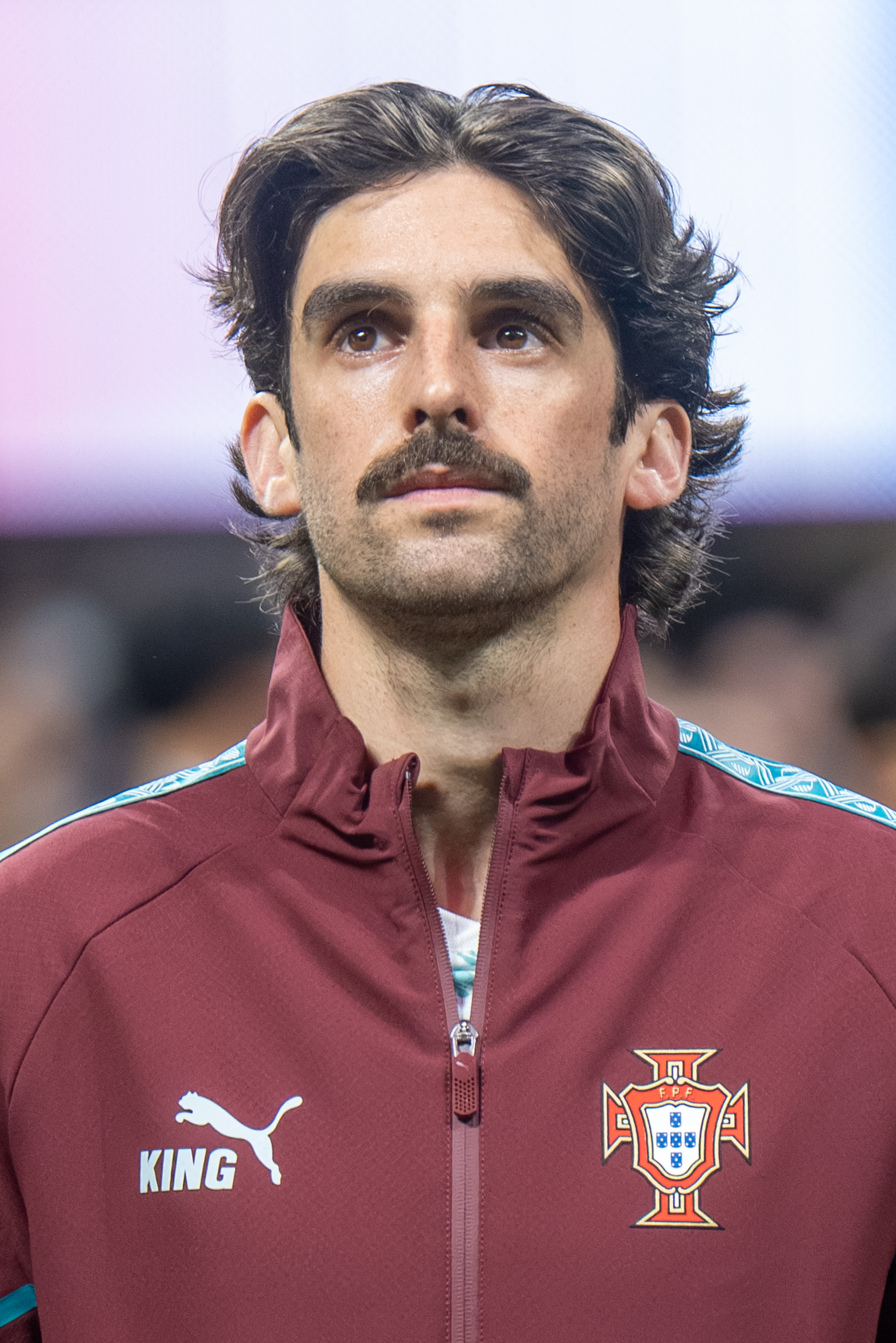
- Trincão with Portugal in 2026

Personal information
- Full name: Francisco António Machado Mota de Castro Trincão
- Date of birth: 29 December 1999 (age 26)
- Place of birth: Viana do Castelo, Portugal
- Height: 1.83 m (6 ft 0 in)
- Position: Winger

Team information
- Current team: Al-Ahli
- Number: 7

Youth career
- 2008–2009: Vianense
- 2009–2010: Porto
- 2010–2011: Vianense
- 2011–2014: Braga
- 2014–2015: Palmeiras Braga
- 2015–2016: Braga

Senior career*
Years	Team	Apps	(Gls)
2016–2018	Braga B	46	(6)
2018–2020	Braga	33	(8)
2020–2023	Barcelona	28	(3)
2021–2022	→ Wolverhampton Wanderers (loan)	28	(2)
2022–2023	→ Sporting CP (loan)	34	(10)
2023–2026	Sporting CP	99	(25)
2026–	Al-Ahli	12	(6)

International career^{‡}
2015–2016	Portugal U17	5	(0)
2017	Portugal U18	7	(1)
2017–2018	Portugal U19	18	(10)
2018–2019	Portugal U20	8	(2)
2019–2021	Portugal U21	8	(3)
2020–	Portugal	24	(3)
Medal record
Men's football
Representing Portugal
UEFA Nations League
Winner	2025 Germany
UEFA European Under-19 Championship
Winner	2018 Finland
- * Club domestic league appearances and goals as of 20:44, 20 November 2026 (UTC) ‡ National team caps and goals as of 21:40, 17 November 2026 (UTC)

Francisco António Machado Mota de Castro Trincão (European Portuguese: [fɾɐ̃ˈsiʃku tɾĩˈkɐ̃w̃]; born 29 December 1999) is a Portuguese professional footballer who plays as a winger for Saudi Pro League club Al-Ahli and the Portugal national team.

He started his career with Braga B, making his debut with the first team in 2018 and winning the 2019–20 Taça da Liga in his second season with the club. In January 2020, he signed with Barcelona for a reported €31 million fee, with the deal made effective in July. He then spent two years on loan, at Wolverhampton Wanderers and Sporting CP, joining the latter permanently in April 2023 and going on to make 208 appearances and win two Primeira Liga titles and the 2024–25 Taça de Portugal.

Trincão represented Portugal at various youth levels, being part of the under-19 team that won the 2018 European Championship where he was crowned top scorer. He made his senior international debut in 2020, and was selected for the 2026 World Cup.

== Club career ==
=== Braga ===
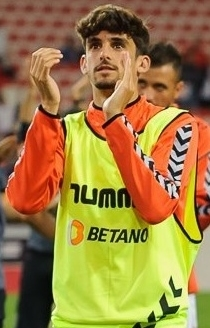
Trincão with Braga in 2019

Born in Viana do Castelo, Trincão began his youth career with hometown club Vianense. He also had a spell at Porto and two at Braga, where he finished his development.

Trincão made his senior debut on 2 April 2016 for Braga's reserves in Segunda Liga, as an 81st-minute substitute for Carlos Fortes in a 2–1 away loss against Freamunde. He scored his first senior goal on 7 May 2017, but in a 2–3 home defeat to Porto B. He scored five times in 2017–18, including twice on 1 October in a 5–4 home win over Nacional for a first victory of the season, and signed a new five-year contract at the end.

On 28 December 2018, Trincão played his first competitive match with the first team in a 4–0 victory at Vitória de Setúbal in the group stage of the Taça da Liga where he replaced Fransérgio in the 62nd minute. Five days later, manager Abel Ferreira gave him a Primeira Liga debut when he came on for Dyego Sousa for the last four minutes of a home defeat of Marítimo.

Trincão scored his first goal for Braga on 12 December 2019 in the last group-phase game of the UEFA Europa League, also assisting in the 4–2 win at Slovan Bratislava as his team advanced in first place. The following 4 January, given a first league start by new coach Ruben Amorim, he scored his first domestic league goal in a 7–1 away demolition of B-SAD. Three weeks later, he was a 50th-minute replacement for Galeno as the Arsenalistas won the league cup final against Porto at the Estádio Municipal de Braga.

=== Barcelona ===
On 31 January 2020, Barcelona announced the transfer of Trincão, initially effective on 1 July. He signed a five-year contract for a €31 million fee, with a buyout clause of €500 million. He made his La Liga debut on 27 September, playing 12 minutes of the 4–0 home victory over Villarreal. He was handed his first start on 20 October in the 5–1 home rout of Ferencváros in the group stage of the UEFA Champions League, replacing Antoine Griezmann as the starting right winger and putting up a good performance.

Trincão scored his first goal on 7 February 2021, closing the 3–2 away win against Real Betis in the domestic league. He added a brace the following weekend after assists by Ilaix Moriba and Lionel Messi, helping the hosts to defeat Alavés 5–1. He contributed five games as the side won the Copa del Rey, totalling 42 overall.

On 4 July 2021, Trincão joined Wolverhampton Wanderers on a season-long loan, subject to medical and work permit and with an option to make the move permanent in the future; he reunited with Pedro Neto, with whom he had played as a child with Vianense and Braga. He made his Premier League debut on 14 August, starting in a 1–0 loss away to Leicester City. His first goal came ten days later, as a second-half substitute in a 4–0 victory at Nottingham Forest in the second round of the EFL Cup.

Trincão registered his first Premier League goal (also providing his first assist in the competition) in a 3–2 defeat at home to Leeds United on 18 March 2022, having come on as a first-half substitute for injured Rúben Neves. He totalled 30 appearances during his tenure, starting in 16 but being only involved in four team goals.

=== Sporting CP ===
On 13 July 2022, Trincão signed a one-year loan deal with Sporting CP for a €3 million fee, with a conditional €7 million obligation to buy 50% of his economic rights, with a reported buy-back clause between €20 and €25 million, depending on the moment it was exercised. He made his league debut on 7 August in a 3–3 draw against his former club Braga. His first goal came exactly one month later, his team's second in the 3–0 away win over Eintracht Frankfurt in the Champions League group phase, their first ever victory in Germany.

Over the following months, Trincão's performances declined and he began enduring a difficult season, with a lengthy scoring drought leading to many supporters demanding he be benched. Despite that, manager Amorim kept him in his starting eleven, and on 27 February 2023 he ran from one end of the penalty box to the other to score in the 2–0 home defeat of Estoril. On 9 April, he netted a hat-trick in a 4–3 win at Casa Pia.

Trincão started 2023–24 on the bench. However, after becoming a starter over Marcus Edwards in January 2024, he scored five goals in four league matches, including a brace in a 8–0 home rout of Casa Pia. Having cemented his role up front alongside Pedro Gonçalves and Viktor Gyökeres, he added four more until the end of the campaign as Sporting won its 20th league, totalling 1,695 minutes.

On 11 January 2025, Trincão was the only player to miss his attempt in the 7–6 penalty shoot-out loss against Benfica in the League Cup final in Leiria. On 10 May, against the same opposition but in the Derby de Lisboa, he opened an eventual 1–1 away draw and, again, finished the season with nine goals to claim a national championship while taking part in all 34 fixtures and providing a league-best 14 assists.

Trincão scored his first brace in the Champions League on 18 September 2025, also being named player of the match in the 4–1 home victory over Kairat in the league phase.

=== Al-Ahli ===
On 18 July 2026, Trincão joined Saudi Pro League side Al-Ahli on a four-year contract.

== International career ==
=== Youth ===
In July 2018, Trincão was a member of the Portugal team which won the UEFA European Under-19 Championship beating Italy 4–3 after extra time; he scored once in the match in Seinäjoki, Finland. Along with teammate Jota, he finished joint top scorer in the tournament with five goals, his others being braces against Norway in the first group fixture and Ukraine in a 5–0 semi-final rout. At the 2019 FIFA U-20 World Cup in Poland he played all three games and scored the only goal of the opening win against South Korea, though his side did not advance from the group.

Trincão won his first cap at under-21 level on 5 September 2019, scoring once and being involved in two other goals in the 4–0 win over Gibraltar for the 2021 European Championship qualifiers. He helped the Portuguese to a runners-up finish at the finals in Hungary and Slovenia, scoring a penalty in a 2–0 group defeat of England.

=== Senior ===
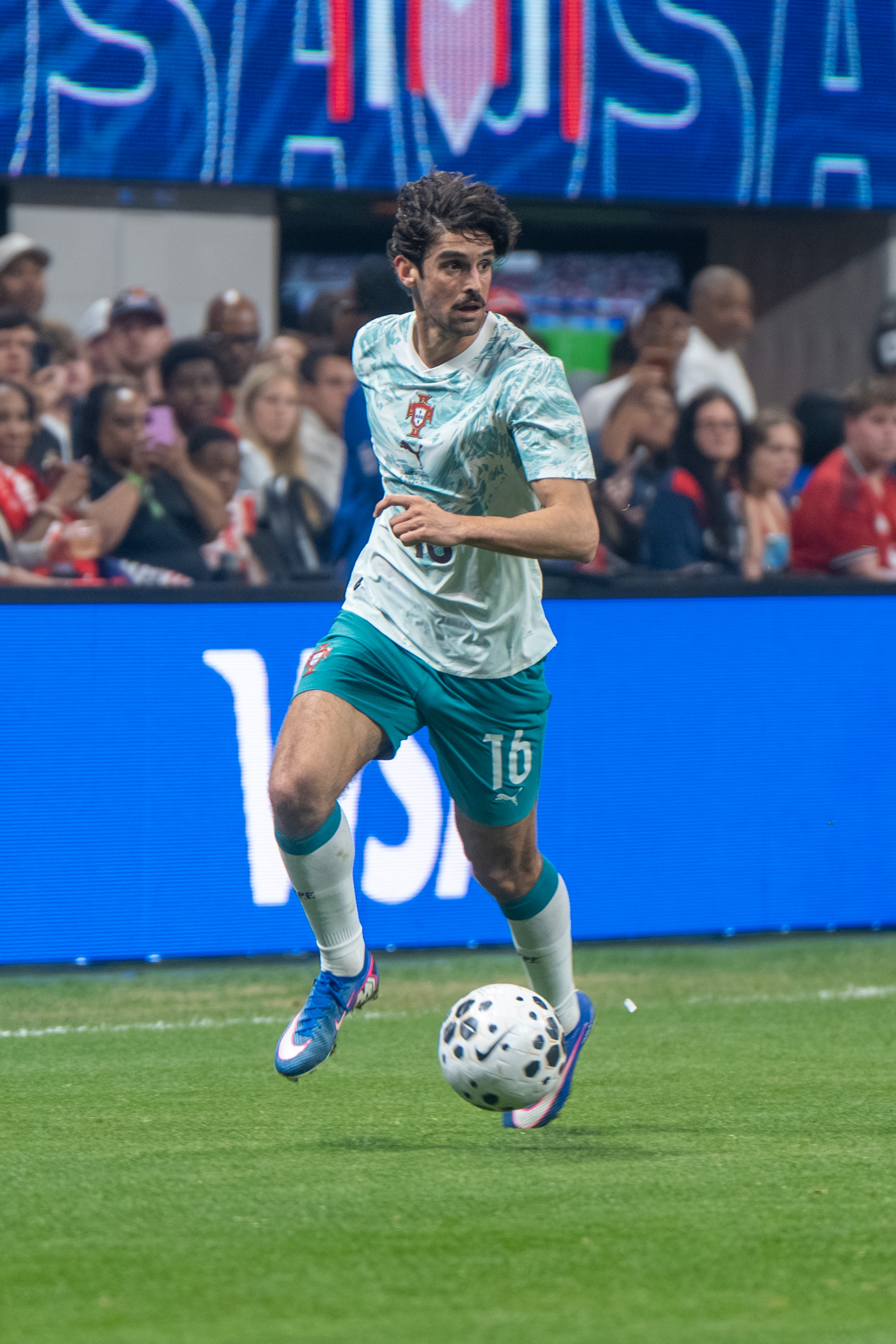
Trincão in action for Portugal in March 2026

In August 2020, Trincão had his first senior call-up for UEFA Nations League matches against Croatia and Sweden the following month. He made his debut on 5 September, replacing Bernardo Silva in the 78th minute of a 4–1 home victory over the former.

Trincão was named in a preliminary 55-man squad for the 2022 FIFA World Cup in Qatar. He did not make the final cut.

In October 2024, courtesy of his Sporting performances, Trincão was called by new manager Roberto Martinez for upcoming 2024–25 Nations League matches. He played 26 minutes in the 3–1 win against Poland in Warsaw.

Trincão scored his first goals for Portugal on 23 March 2025, grabbing a brace in a 5–2 victory over Denmark in the Nations League quarter-finals (5–3 on aggregate) after coming on for Diogo Dalot late into the second half. He was selected for the finals in Germany, starting the 2–1 semi-final defeat of the hosts and being unused in the penalty shoot-out win against Spain.

Trincão was included in the 2026 World Cup squad. He made his debut in the competition on 23 June, featuring 30 minutes of the 5–0 group-stage win over Uzbekistan in place of João Félix.

== Style of play ==
Trincão is a versatile and technical right winger, adept at adapting to various attacking roles. He frequently drifts centrally in possession, creating space for overlapping teammates with tactical intelligence. Known for his ball control, maneuverability in tight spaces and a strong left foot, he excels in one-on-one situations, precise dribbling and incisive passing.

Trincão plays a key role in build-up play through quick combinations and penetrating passes. Despite being left-footed, he uses the outside of his foot creatively and delivers accurate crosses, making him a consistent wide-area threat. Defensively, he is active in pressing and transitions, leveraging his dynamic movement, spatial awareness and adaptability to succeed in high-intensity, possession-focused systems.

== Career statistics ==
=== Club ===
As of match played 2 November 2026

Appearances and goals by club, season and competition
Club	Season	League			National cup (Note: Includes Taça de Portugal, Copa del Rey, FA Cup, King's Cup)		League cup (Note: Includes Taça da Liga, EFL Cup)		Continental		Other		Total	
Club	Season	Division	Apps	Goals	Apps	Goals	Apps	Goals	Apps	Goals	Apps	Goals	Apps	Goals
Braga B	2015–16	LigaPro	4	0	—		—		—		—		4	0
Braga B	2016–17	LigaPro	5	1	—		—		—		—		5	1
Braga B	2017–18	LigaPro	30	5	—		—		—		—		30	5
Braga B	2018–19	LigaPro	7	0	—		—		—		—		7	0
Braga B	Total		46	6	—		—		—		—		46	6
Braga	2018–19	Primeira Liga	6	0	1	0	1	0	—		—		8	0
Braga	2019–20	Primeira Liga	27	8	2	0	3	0	7 (Note: Appearances in UEFA Europa League)	1	—		39	9
Braga	Total		33	8	3	0	4	0	7	1	—		47	9
Barcelona	2020–21	La Liga	28	3	5	0	—		7 (Note: Appearances in UEFA Champions League)	0	2 (Note: Appearances in Supercopa de España)	0	42	3
Wolverhampton Wanderers (loan)	2021–22	Premier League	28	2	1	0	1	1	—		—		30	3
Sporting CP (loan)	2022–23	Primeira Liga	34	10	1	0	5	1	12 (Note: Six appearances in UEFA Champions League, six appearances in UEFA Europa League)	2	—		52	13
Sporting CP	2023–24	Primeira Liga	31	9	6	1	3	0	8	0	—		48	10
Sporting CP	2024–25	Primeira Liga	34	9	7	2	3	0	9	0	1 (Note: Appearance in Supertaça Cândido de Oliveira)	0	54	11
Sporting CP	2025–26	Primeira Liga	34	7	7	2	1	0	11	4	1	0	54	13
Sporting CP	Sporting total		133	35	21	5	12	1	40	6	2	0	208	47
Al-Ahli	2026–27	Saudi Pro League	11	6	1	0	—		3 (Note: Appearance in AFC Champions League Elite)	1	2 (Note: Appearances in FIFA Intercontinental Cup)	0	17	7
Career total			279	60	31	5	17	2	57	8	6	0	390	75

=== International ===
As of match played 17 November 2026

Appearances and goals by national team and year
National team	Year	Apps	Goals
Portugal	2020	6	0
Portugal	2021	1	0
Portugal	2022	0	0
Portugal	2023	0	0
Portugal	2024	2	0
Portugal	2025	6	2
Portugal	2026	9	1
Total		24	3

Scores and results list Portugal's goal tally first, score column indicates score after each Trincão goal.

List of international goals scored by Francisco Trincão
No.	Date	Venue	Cap	Opponent	Score	Result	Competition
1	23 March 2025	Estádio José Alvalade, Lisbon, Portugal	10	Denmark	3–2	5–2 (a.e.t.)	2024–25 UEFA Nations League A
2	23 March 2025	Estádio José Alvalade, Lisbon, Portugal	10	Denmark	4–2	5–2 (a.e.t.)	2024–25 UEFA Nations League A
3	31 March 2026	Mercedes-Benz Stadium, Atlanta, United States	17	United States	1–0	2–0	Friendly

== Honours ==
Braga

- Taça da Liga: 2019–20

Barcelona

- Copa del Rey: 2020–21

Sporting CP

- Primeira Liga: 2023–24, 2024–25
- Taça de Portugal: 2024–25

Portugal U19

- UEFA European Under-19 Championship: 2018

Portugal

- UEFA Nations League: 2024–25

Individual

- Primeira Liga Team of The Year: 2024–25, 2025–26
- UEFA European Under-19 Championship top scorer: 2018
