= Rui Borges =

Portuguese football manager (born 1981)

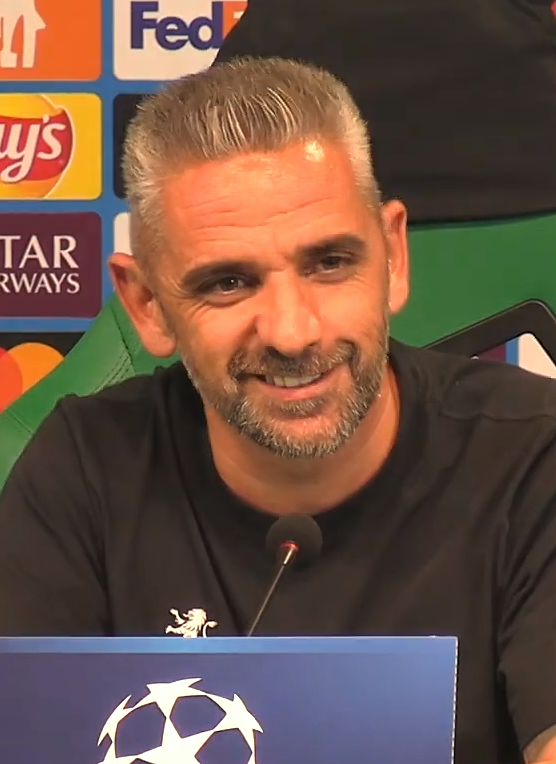
- Borges with Sporting CP in 2025

Personal information
- Full name: Rui Manuel Gomes Borges
- Date of birth: 7 July 1981 (age 45)
- Place of birth: Mirandela, Portugal
- Height: 1.73 m (5 ft 8 in)
- Position: Winger

Youth career
- 1991–2000: Mirandela

Senior career*
Years	Team	Apps	(Gls)
2000–2001	Bragança	12	(4)
2001–2002	Paredes	36	(1)
2002–2004	Braga B	40	(1)
2004–2005	Mirandela		
2005–2007	Bragança		
2007–2008	Trofense	7	(0)
2008	→ Moreirense (loan)	15	(0)
2008–2009	Moreirense	16	(0)
2009–2012	Mirandela	91	(26)
2012–2013	Famalicão	29	(2)
2013	Freamunde	2	(0)
2013–2015	Bragança	56	(8)
2015–2017	Mirandela	53	(6)

Managerial career
- 2017–2019: Mirandela
- 2019–2020: Académico de Viseu
- 2020–2021: Académica
- 2021–2022: Nacional
- 2022–2023: Vilafranquense
- 2023: Mafra
- 2023–2024: Moreirense
- 2024: Vitória Guimarães
- 2024–2026: Sporting CP
- * Club domestic league appearances and goals

Rui Manuel Gomes Borges (born 7 July 1981) is a Portuguese professional football manager and former player who was recently the head coach of Primeira Liga club Sporting CP. He played as a winger for several clubs in Portugal, before starting a managerial career in 2017. In 2023 he broke into the Primeira Liga as head coach of Moreirense, and also coached Vitória de Guimarães before joining Sporting CP, in December 2024. He led Sporting CP to the 2024–25 Primeira Liga and Taça de Portugal titles.

== Playing career ==
A youth graduate of hometown club Mirandela, Borges made his senior debut with Bragança during the 2000–01 Segunda Divisão B. He subsequently represented Paredes and Braga B in the same division, before returning to Mirandela in 2004, with the club in Terceira Divisão.

In June 2007, after another stint at Bragança, Borges signed for Segunda Liga side Trofense. He made his professional debut on 4 August, starting in a 2–1 home win over Feirense for the season's Taça da Liga, but only featured rarely and was subsequently loaned to third division club Moreirense in January 2008.

Borges signed a permanent deal with Moreirense after his loan spell, but returned to Mirandela in 2009. He scored a career-best 12 goals during the 2010–11 season, helping in the club's promotion to the third level after two years.

On 6 June 2012, Borges agreed to a contract with Famalicão. After being regularly used, he moved to Freamunde in June 2013, but left in September to return to Bragança.

In July 2015, Borges was announced back at his first club Mirandela. He was a regular starter during his two-year spell, and retired in June 2017, aged 35.

== Coaching career ==
=== Early career ===
Immediately after retiring, Borges took up coaching at his last club Mirandela. On 5 February 2019, he left to take over second division side Académico de Viseu.

Borges left Viseu on a mutual agreement on 11 July 2020, and was named in charge of fellow league team Académica de Coimbra in the following day. On 22 September 2021, after seven winless matches into the new season, he was sacked, but was appointed Nacional manager just hours later.

Borges announced his departure from Nacional on 18 May 2022, and replaced Filipe Gouveia at the helm of Vilafranquense nine days later. He resigned from the club on 7 February 2023, after having discrepancies with the board, and was named manager of Mafra three days later.

=== Moreirense ===
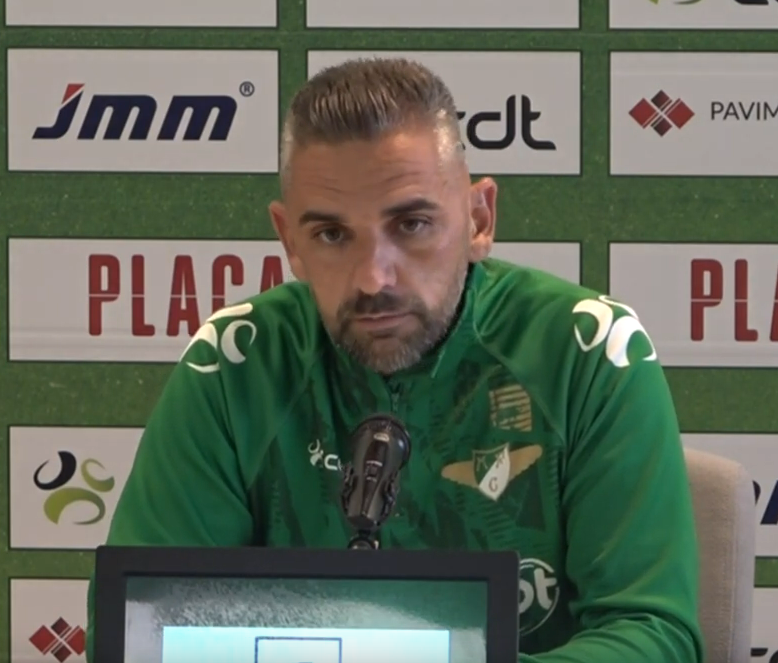
Borges as manager of Moreirense in 2023

Borges left Mafra on 1 June 2023, and was announced as manager of Primeira Liga side Moreirense on 4 July. On his top-flight debut on 14 August, the team lost 2–1 at home to Porto.

On 5 December 2023, with Moreirense sitting in sixth place in the Primeira Liga, having recently secured a 0–0 draw with Benfica at the Estádio da Luz, Borges signed a three-year contract extension. He finished the campaign in that position, the club's best-ever inputs in the top tier.

=== Vitória de Guimarães ===
After being linked to Vitória de Guimarães' vacant managerial role, Borges signed a two-year contract with the club on 28 May 2024. He led the side to an unbeaten status in the 2024–25 UEFA Conference League, winning all six matches of the qualifying rounds and totalling four wins and two draws in the league phase.

=== Sporting CP ===
On 26 December 2024, Borges was presented as new manager of Sporting CP. The club reportedly paid a €4.1 million fee for his transfer. He successfully defended Sporting's title after Ruben Amorim's departure and João Pereira's troubled period as Sporting's manager. He also achieved the Taça de Portugal after a 3–1 extra-time win over Benfica in the final. In the following season, he guided the club to the Champions League quarter-finals, qualifying for that stage for the first time since 1982–83. On 1 November 2026, he was dismissed following a poor start to the 2026–27 season, with Sporting nine points behind leaders Porto.

== Managerial statistics ==
As of 30 October 2026

Managerial record by team and tenure
Team	From	To	Record							
Team	From	To	G	W	D	L	GF	GA	GD	Win %
Mirandela	27 June 2017	5 February 2019	55	29	12	14	84	54	+30	52.73
Académico de Viseu	5 February 2019	11 July 2020	46	21	10	15	59	50	+9	45.65
Académica	12 July 2020	22 September 2021	44	19	13	12	57	49	+8	43.18
Nacional	23 September 2021	18 May 2022	30	13	8	9	48	37	+11	43.33
Vilafranquense	27 May 2022	7 February 2023	24	9	8	7	30	27	+3	37.50
Mafra	10 February 2023	1 June 2023	15	7	6	2	23	17	+6	46.67
Moreirense	4 July 2023	28 May 2024	36	16	8	12	38	38	+0	44.44
Vitória Guimarães	28 May 2024	26 December 2024	30	18	7	5	56	25	+31	60.00
Sporting CP	26 December 2024	1 November 2026	99	64	22	13	220	93	+127	64.65
Career totals			379	196	94	89	615	390	+225	51.72

== Honours ==
Sporting CP

- Primeira Liga: 2024–25
- Taça de Portugal: 2024–25

Individual

- Primeira Liga Manager of the Season: 2025
- Primera Liga Manager of the Month: November 2025, February 2026
