= José Tavares (football manager) =

Portuguese football manager (born 1985)

Personal information
- Full name: José Fernando Ferreirinha Tavares
- Date of birth: 21 August 1985 (age 41)
- Place of birth: Vila Nova de Gaia, Portugal
- Position: Defender

Youth career
- 1989–1993: Sport Canidelo
- 1993–1999: Boavista

Senior career*
Years	Team	Apps	(Gls)
2001–2003	Coimbrões		

Managerial career
- 2016: Porto B
- 2022–2024: Crown Legacy FC
- 2025: Porto (caretaker)
- * Club domestic league appearances and goals

José Fernando Ferreirinha Tavares (born 21 August 1980) is a Portuguese football manager.

== Career ==
Born in Vila Nova de Gaia in the Porto metropolitan area, Tavares played as a youth for Sport Canidelo and Boavista F.C. before a brief senior career with S.C. Coimbrões. After graduating with a degree in sport from the University of Porto, he began coaching in youth football at F.C. Paços de Ferreira and U.S.C. Paredes before arriving at FC Porto in 2010. Having won the under-15 national title with a team built around Rúben Neves in his first season, he was promoted to a opposition scout for first-team manager Vítor Pereira.

When Pereira left in 2013, Tavares became the assistant manager of the reserve team. After their manager Luís Castro left for Rio Ave F.C. he succeeded him on 14 November 2016. He won three of his eight fixtures. In 2017, he was named coordinator of the youth teams; the under-19 team won the UEFA Youth League in 2018–19 during his mandate.

In 2022, Tavares moved abroad to Crown Legacy FC, the MLS Next Pro affiliate of Charlotte FC. He left in June 2024 to rejoin his wife and three sons, and be academy manager at Porto.

On 20 January 2025, Porto president André Villas-Boas sacked Vítor Bruno and put Tavares as caretaker manager. In his two games before the appointment of Martín Anselmi, he lost 1–0 at home to Olympiacos F.C. in the UEFA Europa League league phase on his debut on 23 January, and drew 1–1 with C.D. Santa Clara in his one Primeira Liga game three days later, also at the Estádio do Dragão.
