= José Augusto Faria =

Portuguese football manager and former player (born 1986)

Personal information
- Full name: José Augusto Gonçalves Pinto de Almeida Faria
- Date of birth: 7 June 1986 (age 40)
- Place of birth: Matosinhos, Portugal
- Height: 1.81 m (5 ft 11 in)
- Position: Right-back

Team information
- Current team: Farense (manager)

Youth career
- 1994–2005: Leixões

Senior career*
| Years | Team | Apps | (Gls) |
| 2005–2006 | Leixões | 0 | (0) |
| 2006 | Leça | | |
| 2006–2007 | Pedras Rubras | | |
| 2007–2008 | Infesta | 4 | (0) |
| 2008–2011 | Leça | 63 | (6) |
| 2011–2012 | Salgueiros 08 | 16 | (1) |
| 2012–2013 | Leixões | 4 | (0) |
| 2013 | Académico Viseu | 3 | (0) |
| 2014–2015 | Custóias | | |
| 2015 | Valadares Gaia | 6 | (0) |
| 2015–2016 | Pedrouços | 32 | (2) |
| 2016–2017 | Perafita | 19 | (0) |

Managerial career
- 2017–2018: Leixões B
- 2020: Leixões (youth)
- 2020–2021: Leixões U23
- 2024–2025: Estrela Amadora
- 2026–: Farense
- * Club domestic league appearances and goals

José Augusto Gonçalves Pinto de Almeida Faria (born 7 June 1986) is a Portuguese professional football manager and former player who played as a right-back. He is the manager of Liga Portugal 2 club Farense.

== Playing career ==
Known as Zé Augusto as a player, he was born in Matosinhos, and was a youth product of hometown side Leixões. Promoted to the first team ahead of the 2005–06 season, he left for Terceira Divisão side Leça in January 2006 before making his senior debut.

In 2007, after a one-year spell at fellow fourth division side Pedras Rubras, Zé Augusto moved to Infesta in Segunda Divisão. Despite being rarely used, he returned to Leça in 2008, scoring a career-best five goals in the 2010–11 campaign.

Zé Augusto returned to Leixões in 2012, after achieving promotion from the regional leagues with Salgueiros 08. He made his professional debut on 29 July of that year, starting in a 1–1 Taça de Portugal away draw against Portimonense, but only would feature in four Segunda Liga matches during the entire season.

In 2013, Zé Augusto joined fellow second division side Académico Viseu, but rescinded his contract on 10 October of that year, after just three appearances. He moved to Custóias on 5 February 2014, but left roughly a year later for Valadares Gaia.

Zé Augusto subsequently represented Pedrouços and Perafita also in the regional divisions, before retiring from football in 2017 at the age of 31. He would still play for futsal side Matosinhos Futsal Clube for two seasons.

== Managerial career ==
Shortly after retiring, Faria returned to his main club Leixões, as a manager of the B-team. He became a youth coordinator in 2018, before taking over the club's under-19 squad in 2020.

Faria later took over the under-23 team, before going into controversy on 6 April 2021, after stating that "football has to belong to the men of football". Accused of having a machista statement, he later apologised, but left Leixões by mutual consent six days later.

In July 2021, Faria joined Estrela Amadora as a youth coordinator. On 31 July 2023, he was named the sporting director of the club, before becoming an interim manager on 24 September 2024, after the departure of Filipe Martins.

Faria's first match in the Primeira Liga occurred on 28 September 2024, a 2–1 home win over Moreirense. Despite suffering a subsequent 3–0 loss to Gil Vicente, he was kept as manager.

On 16 September 2025, Faria was sacked from Estrela after a poor start of the 2025–26 season.
