= Maestro Custodio =

Spanish writer

El Maestro Custodio is believed to have been a 14th-century Benedictine monk, living in the city of Oviedo in Asturias, Spain. Several later historians cited a book by him, a now lost history of Asturias. Strangely, although the 18th century historians cited Maestro Custodio's work, they claimed it had already been lost at the time they were writing.
