= Vítor Bruno (football manager) =

Portuguese football manager and former player (born 1982)

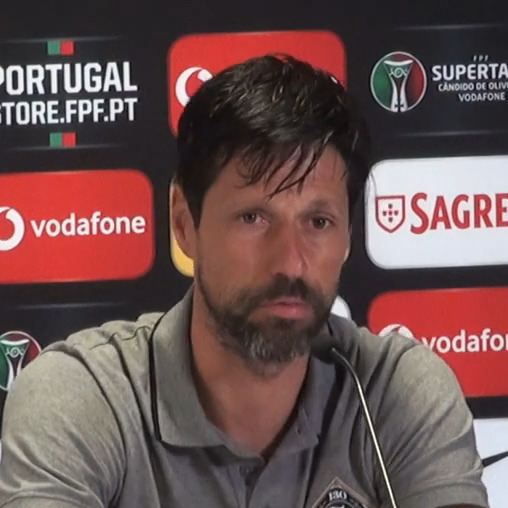
- Vítor Bruno in 2024

Personal information
- Full name: Vítor Bruno Clara Santos Motas Fernandes
- Date of birth: 2 December 1982 (age 43)
- Place of birth: Coimbra, Portugal
- Positions: Right-back; midfielder

Team information
- Current team: Anderlecht (manager)

Youth career
- 1990–2001: Académica

Senior career*
Years	Team	Apps	(Gls)
2001	Bidoeirense		
2001–2002	Vigor Mocidade		
2002–2003	Mirandense		
2003–2004	Tourizense		
2004–2006	Marialvas		
2006–2007	Gândara		
2007–2008	Valonguense		

Managerial career
- 2024–2025: Porto
- 2026–: Anderlecht
- * Club domestic league appearances and goals

Vítor Bruno Clara Santos Motas Fernandes (Portuguese pronunciation: [ˈvitɔɾ ˈβɾunu]; born 2 December 1982), known as Vítor Bruno, is a Portuguese professional football manager and former player who played as either a right-back or a midfielder. He is currently the head of coach of the Belgian football club Anderlecht.

== Playing career ==
Born in Coimbra, Vítor Bruno joined the youth sides of Académica de Coimbra in 1990. After making his senior debut with Terceira Divisão side Bidoeirense in 2001, he subsequently represented Vigor da Mocidade, Mirandense, Tourizense, Marialvas, Gândara and Valonguense. He retired with the latter in 2008, aged just 25.

== Managerial career ==
=== Assistant ===
After retiring, Vítor Bruno graduated in sports science at the University of Coimbra, and subsequently joined Augusto Inácio's staff at Angolan side Interclube in 2009, as his assistant. After short periods working under his father at 1º de Agosto in the same country and USMB in Algeria, he followed Inácio to Naval and Leixões.

In 2011, Vítor Bruno joined the technical staff of Sérgio Conceição at Olhanense, as a fitness coach. He remained under the same role at Académica, Braga, Vitória de Guimarães, Nantes and Porto; at the latter, he only officially became an assistant in 2021.

Vítor Bruno was in charge of Porto's senior squad in a professional match for the first time in April 2019, in a 2–0 win over Boavista as Conceição was suspended. In the following five years, he replaced Conceição in a further 16 matches, winning 14 of them and having other two draws.

In May 2024, several media outlets reported an altercation between Vítor Bruno and Conceição, after he was not included in Conceição's agreement with Porto president Jorge Nuno Pinto da Costa for a renewal. Vítor Bruno left Conceição's staff on 30 May, and released a note in the following day stating that no altercations between himself and Conceição existed, as he previously stated a desire to pursue a managerial career.

=== Porto ===
On 6 June 2024, Vítor Bruno was announced as manager of Porto on a two-year contract, becoming the first manager of new president André Villas-Boas' tenure. He was sacked on 20 January of the following year, after only seven months at the club; he led the side for 29 matches, winning 18 of those and lifting the Supertaça Cândido de Oliveira trophy.

=== Anderlecht ===
On 23 June 2026, Vítor Bruno was announced as the head coach of Anderlecht.

== Personal life ==
Vítor Bruno is the son of former player and manager Vítor Manuel. He is married to Elsa Varela, a former player of the Portugal women's national rugby union team, with whom he has three children.

== Managerial statistics ==
As of match played 22 November 2026

Managerial record by team and tenure
Team	Nat	From	To	Record								Ref
Team	Nat	From	To	G	W	D	L	GF	GA	GD	Win %	Ref
Porto	(Portugal)	6 June 2024	20 January 2025	29	18	3	8	63	30	+33	62.07	
Anderlecht	(Belgium)	1 July 2026	present	23	14	3	6	36	21	+15	60.87	
Career total				52	32	6	14	99	51	+48	61.54	–

== Honours ==
=== Manager ===
Porto

- Supertaça Cândido de Oliveira: 2024

Individual

- Primeira Liga Manager of the Month: December 2024
