= 2026–27 Primeira Liga =

93rd season of top-tier Portuguese football

Primeira Liga
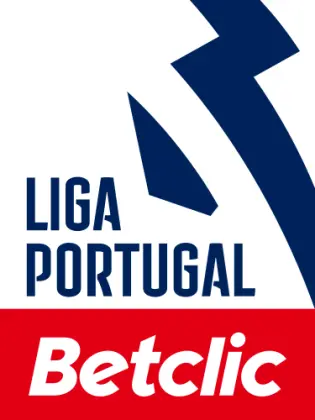
- Season: 2026–27
- Dates: 7 August 2026 – 16 May 2027
- All statistics correct as of 29 August 2026.

The 2026–27 Liga Portugal (also known as Liga Portugal Betclic for sponsorship reasons) is the 93rd season of the Primeira Liga, a professional association football competition that serves as the highest level on the Portuguese association football league system clubs and the fourth season under the current Liga Portugal Betclic title. This is the tenth Primeira Liga season to use video assistant referee (VAR). 18 clubs will participate in the competition.

Porto are the defending champions, having won their 31st title in the previous season.

== Teams ==
=== Changes ===
The following teams changed division, either exiting or joining Liga Portugal, since the 2025–26 season.

▲ Promoted from Liga Portugal 2	▼ Relegated to Liga Portugal 2
Marítimo; Académico de Viseu	AVS; Tondela

=== Location and stadiums ===
Locations of teams in the 2026–27 Primeira Liga.
Locations of teams in the 2025–26 Primeira Liga from the Lisbon area
Locations of teams in the 2026–27 Primeira Liga from Madeira.
Locations of teams in the 2026–27 Primeira Liga from Azores.

Team	Location	Stadium	Capacity	2025–26 season
Académico de Viseu^{↑}	Viseu	Estádio Municipal do Fontelo	6,912	2nd in LP 2
Alverca	Alverca do Ribatejo	Complexo Desportivo FC Alverca	6,932	11th in PL
Arouca	Arouca	Estádio Municipal de Arouca	5,000	8th in PL
Benfica	Lisbon	Estádio da Luz	68,100	3rd in PL
Braga	Braga	Estádio Municipal de Braga	30,286	4th in PL
Casa Pia	Lisbon	Estádio Municipal de Rio Maior, at Rio Maior (Note: As the Estádio Pina Manique did not meet the standards to host Primeira Liga matches, Casa Pia played their home matches at the Estádio Municipal de Rio Maior in Rio Maior.)	7,000	16th in PL
Estoril Praia	Estoril	Estádio António Coimbra da Mota	5,094	10th in PL
Estrela da Amadora	Amadora	Estádio José Gomes	9,288	15th in PL
Famalicão	Vila Nova de Famalicão	Estádio Municipal de Famalicão	5,186	5th in PL
Gil Vicente	Barcelos	Estádio Cidade de Barcelos	12,046	6th in PL
Marítimo^{↑}	Funchal	Estádio do Marítimo	10,600	1st in LP 2
Moreirense	Guimarães	Estádio Comendador Joaquim de Almeida Freitas	6,150	7th in PL
Nacional	Funchal	Estádio da Madeira	5,200	14th in PL
Porto	Porto	Estádio do Dragão	50,033	1st in PL
Rio Ave	Vila do Conde	Estadio dos Arcos	5,300	12th in PL
Santa Clara	Ponta Delgada	Estádio de São Miguel	12,500	13th in PL
Sporting CP	Lisbon	Estádio José Alvalade	52,095	2nd in PL
Vitória de Guimarães	Guimarães	Estádio D. Afonso Henriques	30,029	9th in PL

^{↑}	Promoted from the Liga Portugal 2

League notes:
- PL: Primeira Liga
- LP 2: Liga Portugal 2

=== Personnel and kits ===
Note: Flags indicate national team as has been defined under FIFA eligibility rules. Players and coaches may hold more than one non-FIFA nationality.

Team	Manager	Captain	Kit manufacturer	Main kit sponsor	Other kit sponsor(s)
Académico de Viseu	(Portugal national football team) Bruno Pinheiro	(Portugal national football team) Luís Silva	(Spain) Joma	Visabeira	List: Front: Buondi caffé; Back: Visipapel, Quinta de Lemos; Sleeves: DAZN; Shorts: Águas do Caramulo, 2PLAY
Alverca	(Portugal national football team) Sérgio Ferreira	(Spain national football team) Sergi Gómez	(United States) Nike	Placard.pt	List: Front: Hospital da Luz; Back: Das WeltAuto; Sleeves: DAZN; Shorts: Air Europa, Água de Monfortinho
Arouca	(Portugal national football team) Vítor Severino	(Portugal national football team) Tiago Esgaio	(Portugal) Skita	bwin	List: Front: None; Back: Castro Electrónica, Const. Carlos Pinho, Lda.; Sleeves: Hospital da Luz; Shorts: None
Benfica	(Portugal national football team) Marco Silva	(Norway national football team) Fredrik Aursnes	(Germany) Adidas	Emirates	List: Front: None; Back: Sagres / Benfica Foundation (in UEFA matches); Sleeves: Betano / Benfica Foundation (in UEFA matches); Shorts: None
Braga	(Portugal national football team) Franclim Carvalho	(Portugal national football team) Ricardo Horta	(Germany) Puma	Solverde.pt	List: Front: Soleo Piscinas; Back: AMCO Intermediários de Crédito, Lusíadas; Sleeves: Tek4life; Shorts: SABSEG Seguros, 2045 Empresa de Segurança
Casa Pia	(Portugal national football team) Filipe Coelho	(Portugal national football team) André Geraldes	(Germany) Adidas	bwin	List: Front: Hospital da Luz; Back: Benecar - Cidade do Automóvel; Sleeves: Silogia; Shorts: Domino's
Estoril Praia	(Portugal national football team) Sérgio Raimundo	(Portugal national football team) João Carvalho	(United States) Reebok	Solverde.pt	List: Front: None; Back: VWFS.pt - Volkswagen Financial Services, Auditiv; Sleeves: None; Shorts: MBW - Modular Builders Worldwide, Águas do Caramulo
Estrela da Amadora	(Portugal national football team) Pepa	(Serbia national football team) Stefan Leković	(Germany) Adidas	Lebull	List: Front: Marcos Car; Back: Centro de Reciclagem da Amadora; Sleeves: Hospital da Luz; Shorts: Solfaestofo – Estofos e decoração, RE/MAX Yes
Famalicão	(Cape Verde national football team) Ricardo Silva	(Netherlands national football team) Tom van de Looi	(Germany) Puma	bwin	List: Front: None; Back: Mercainox - aço inoxidável, Hyundai; Sleeves: Chanceplus - Intermediário de Crédito; Shorts: Enif
Gil Vicente	(Portugal national football team) Luís Pinto	(Angola national football team) Jonathan Buatu	(Spain) Joma	Goldenpark Casino	List: Front: H.M. Motor; Back: Barcelos, RAIZE.pt; Sleeves: Lusíadas; Shorts: GrupoMEGA.pt Tecnologia
Marítimo	(Netherlands national football team) Mitchell van der Gaag	(Portugal national football team) Romain Correia	(Denmark) Hummel	bwin	List: Front: Madeira. Tão tua; Back: Cerveja Coral, Rolo Pastelaria; Sleeves: Alberto Oculista; Shorts: Hospital CUF, OK Condutor
Moreirense	(Portugal national football team) Vasco Botelho da Costa	(Portugal national football team) Dinis Pinto	(Spain) CDT	Placard.pt	List: Front: tvi; Back: Nutribio, Zome Guimarães ASA; Sleeves: Lusíadas; Shorts: Nortecar
Nacional	(Portugal national football team) João Henriques	(Brazil national football team) Léo Santos	(Italy) Kappa	Coral Cerveja	List: Front: None; Back: Madeira. Tão tua; Sleeves: None; Shorts: None
Porto	(Italy national football team) Francesco Farioli	(Portugal national football team) Diogo Costa	(United States) New Balance	Betano	List: Front: None; Back: Super Bock; Sleeves: XTB / Super Bock (in UEFA matches); Shorts: None
Rio Ave	(Portugal national football team) Vasco Seabra	(Greece national football team) Marios Vrousai	(Germany) Adidas	Lebull	List: Front: Lusíadas; Back: UZO, Confirent - Grupo Confiauto; Sleeves: San Miguel; Shorts: None
Santa Clara	(Portugal national football team) Petit	(Portugal national football team) Gonçalo Paciência	(United Kingdom) Umbro	Lebull	List: Front: Azores Airlines; Back: Açores, Certificado pela Natureza, N9V.pt; Sleeves: Ilha Verde Rent a Car; Shorts: Hospital CUF
Sporting CP	(Portugal national football team) Paulo Fonseca	(Portugal national football team) Gonçalo Inácio	(United States) Nike	Betano	List: Front: None; Back: Super Bock; Sleeves: Super Bock (in UEFA matches); Shorts: None
Vitória de Guimarães	(Portugal national football team) Tiago Margarido	(Portugal national football team) Samu Silva	(Denmark) Hummel	Placard.pt	List: Front: Nortecar; Back: UZO, GuimarãeShopping; Sleeves: FiniConde - Intermediários de Crédito; Shorts: Mood Real Estate Store

=== Managerial changes ===
Team	Outgoing manager	Manner of departure	Date of vacancy	Position in table	Incoming manager	Date of appointment
Alverca	(Portugal) Custódio	Resigned	16 May 2026	Pre-season	(Portugal) Sérgio Ferreira	29 June 2026
Nacional	(Portugal) Tiago Margarido	Mutual consent	20 May 2026	Pre-season	(Portugal) João Gião	26 May 2026
Estoril Praia	(Scotland) Ian Cathro	Signed by Saint-Étienne	8 June 2026	Pre-season	(Portugal) Vasco Matos	8 July 2026
Benfica	(Portugal) José Mourinho	Signed by Real Madrid	9 June 2026	Pre-season	(Portugal) Marco Silva	9 June 2026
Estrela Amadora	(Italy) Cristiano Bacci	End of contract	12 June 2026	Pre-season	(Portugal) Pepa	12 June 2026
Académico de Viseu	(Portugal) Sérgio Fonseca	End of contract	13 June 2026	Pre-season	(Portugal) Bruno Pinheiro	19 June 2026
Gil Vicente	(Portugal) César Peixoto	Signed by Wolverhampton Wanderers	15 June 2026	Pre-season	(Portugal) Luís Pinto	20 June 2026
Casa Pia	(Portugal) Álvaro Pacheco	Mutual consent	16 June 2026	Pre-season	(Portugal) Filipe Coelho	5 July 2026
Vitória de Guimarães	(Portugal) Gil Lameiras	Demoted to the B-Team	24 June 2026	Pre-season	(Portugal) Tiago Margarido	24 June 2026
Famalicão	(Portugal) Hugo Oliveira	Signed by Strasbourg	12 July 2026	Pre-season	(Portugal) Carlos Carvalhal	14 July 2026
Nacional	(Portugal) João Gião	Sacked	2 September 2026	9th	(Portugal) Bruno Abreu (caretaker)	2 September 2026
Nacional	(Portugal) Bruno Abreu	End of caretaker spell	7 September 2026	11th	(Portugal) Alexandre Santos	7 September 2026
Rio Ave	(Greece) Sotiris Sylaidopoulos	Sacked	4 October 2026	16th	(Portugal) Vasco Seabra	4 October 2026
Arouca	(Portugal) Vasco Seabra	Signed for Rio Ave	4 October 2026	5th	(Portugal) Vítor Severino	4 October 2026
Estoril Praia	(Portugal) Vasco Matos	Sacked	15 October 2026	16th	(Portugal) Sérgio Raimundo (Note: Originally as caretaker manager, appointed on a permanent basis on 8 November 2026.)	16 October 2026
Famalicão	(Portugal) Carlos Carvalhal	Sacked	19 October 2026	13th	(Cape Verde) Ricardo Silva (Note: Originally as caretaker manager, appointed on a permanent basis on 11 November 2026.)	19 October 2026
Braga	(Spain) Carlos Vicens	Sacked	20 October 2026	10th	(Portugal) Franclim Carvalho	20 October 2026
Nacional	(Portugal) Alexandre Santos	Sacked	20 October 2026	16th	(Portugal) Bruno Abreu (caretaker)	20 October 2026
Nacional	(Portugal) Bruno Abreu	End of caretaker spell	26 October 2026	15th	(Portugal) João Henriques	26 October 2026
Sporting CP	(Portugal) Rui Borges	Sacked	1 November 2026	3rd	(Portugal) Tiago Fernandes (caretaker)	2 November 2026
Sporting CP	(Portugal) Tiago Fernandes	End of caretaker spell	4 November 2026	3rd	(Portugal) Paulo Fonseca	4 November 2026

== Standings ==
=== League table ===
Pos	Team	Pld	W	D	L	GF	GA	GD	Pts	Qualification or relegation
1	Porto	11	11	0	0	27	5	+22	33	Qualification for the Champions League league phase
2	Benfica	11	9	1	1	30	10	+20	28	Qualification for the Champions League league phase
3	Sporting CP	11	7	3	1	24	11	+13	24	Qualification for the Champions League third qualifying round
4	Santa Clara	11	6	3	2	16	8	+8	21	Qualification for the Europa League second qualifying round (Note: The 2026–27 Taça de Portugal winners qualify for the Europa League league phase (or the fourth-placed team of the Primeira Liga if the Taça de Portugal winners finish in the top three). If the Taça de Portugal winners finish in the top four of the Primeira Liga, the Europa League second qualifying round spot will be passed to the fifth-placed team. If the Taça de Portugal winners finish in the top five of the Primeira Liga, the Conference League spot will be passed to the sixth-placed team.)
5	Arouca	11	6	2	3	13	8	+5	20	Qualification for the Conference League second qualifying round
6	Académico de Viseu	11	6	2	3	15	13	+2	20	
7	Gil Vicente	11	5	3	3	10	8	+2	18	
8	Braga	11	5	2	4	13	11	+2	17	
9	Moreirense	11	4	2	5	13	18	−5	14	
10	Famalicão	11	3	4	4	15	14	+1	13	
11	Alverca	11	3	3	5	14	15	−1	12	
12	Estrela da Amadora	11	2	4	5	17	22	−5	10	
13	Nacional	11	3	1	7	11	19	−8	10	
14	Vitória de Guimarães	11	2	3	6	11	12	−1	9	
15	Marítimo	10	2	2	6	9	21	−12	8	
16	Casa Pia	11	2	2	7	6	20	−14	8	Qualification for the Relegation play-off
17	Rio Ave	11	2	1	8	9	24	−15	7	Relegation to Liga Portugal 2
18	Estoril Praia	10	0	2	8	5	19	−14	2	Relegation to Liga Portugal 2

Updated to match(es) played on 8 November 2026. Source: Liga Portugal
Rules for classification: 1) Points; 2) Head-to-head points; 3) Head-to-head goal difference; 4) Goal difference; 5) Matches won; 6) Goals scored; 7) Play-off.

=== Position by round ===
Team ╲ Round	1	2	3	4	5	6	7	8	9	10	11	12	13	14	15	16	17	18	19	20	21	22	23	24	25	26	27	28	29	30	31	32	33	34
Porto	1	2	1	1	1	1	1	1	1	1	1	1																						
Benfica	11	4	2	2	2	2	2	2	2	2	2	2																						
Sporting CP	12	6	3	3	3	3	3	3	3	3	3																							
Santa Clara	9	7	5	6	4	4	4	4	4	4	4																							
Arouca	2	1	6	4	5	5	5	5	5	5	5																							
Académico de Viseu	5	11	12	15	10	8	7	6	6	6	6																							
Gil Vicente	3	8	7	7	7	9	9	8	7	7	7																							
Braga	10	10	13	10	8	7	6	9	9	8	8																							
Moreirense	8	15	17	11	13	11	12	11	10	9	9																							
Alverca	18	13	15	16	16	12	10	7	8	10	11																							
Famalicão	14	12	14	14	14	13	13	13	11	11	10																							
Estrela da Amadora	7	9	8	5	6	6	8	10	12	12																								
Vitória de Guimarães	17	16	10	12	11	14	14	15	13	13																								
Marítimo	4	3	4	8	9	10	11	12	14	14																								
Nacional	6	5	9	9	12	15	15	16	15	15																								
Rio Ave	16	17	11	13	15	16	16	14	17	16	17																							
Casa Pia	15	18	18	18	18	18	17	17	16	17																								
Estoril Praia	13	14	16	17	17	17	18	18	18	18	18																							

Qualification for the Champions League league phase
Qualification for the Champions League third qualifying round
Qualification for the Europa League second qualifying round
Qualification for the Conference League second qualifying round
Qualification for the Relegation play-off
Relegation to the Liga Portugal 2

Updated to match(es) played on 26 October 2026. Source: Liga Portugal

== Results ==
=== Fixture and results ===
Home \ Away	AVF	ALV	FCA	SLB	SCB	CAC	EPF	CFE	FCF	GVF	CSM	MFC	CDN	FCP	RAF	STC	SCP	VSC
Académico de Viseu							2–1							0–3	2–1	0–1		2–1
Alverca			0–1		1–2	1–1		2–2							1–0	1–1		
Arouca								1–0			2–1	4–0	1–0			1–2		
Benfica	2–2	1–0					2–1			3–1				a			a	2–0
Braga							1–0		3–0	1–2							1–3	1–0
Casa Pia				0–7								0–1		1–4		0–1	0–2	
Estoril Praia			0–0			1–2			1–1			1–3			0–2			
Estrela da Amadora	0–2			2–3	2–1	0–2			2–2								2–2	
Famalicão		1–4	1–0							0–0	1–2						1–1	
Gil Vicente	0–1					2–0					1–1			0–1	1–0			0–0
Marítimo	2–2			0–3		1–0		2–1						1–2		0–2		
Moreirense				0–4	2–2					0–1	3–1							
Nacional	1–0	1–3			1–0		2–0	2–3	0–4									
Porto		2–0	2–0	3–1			3–0					2–1					a	
Rio Ave					0–1			3–3	0–4				3–2	0–2			0–4	
Santa Clara				1–2	0–0				1–0	1–2			2–2		4–0			
Sporting CP	1–2	3–1	2–2	a								1–0	2–0	a				3–2
Vitória de Guimarães			0–1		a	0–0					5–0	1–1	1–0	1–2				

Updated to match(es) played on 8 November 2026. Source: Liga Portugal
Legend: Blue = home team win; Yellow = draw; Red = away team win.
For upcoming matches, an "a" indicates there is an article about the rivalry between the two participants.

=== Results by round ===
Team ╲ Round	1	2	3	4	5	6	7	8	9	10	11	12	13	14	15	16	17	18	19	20	21	22	23	24	25	26	27	28	29	30	31	32	33	34
Académico de Viseu																																		
Alverca																																		
Arouca																																		
Benfica																																		
Braga																																		
Casa Pia																																		
Estoril Praia																																		
Estrela da Amadora																																		
Famalicão																																		
Gil Vicente																																		
Marítimo																																		
Moreirense																																		
Nacional																																		
Porto																																		
Rio Ave																																		
Santa Clara																																		
Sporting CP																																		
Vitória de Guimarães																																		

First match(es) will be played on ?. Source: Liga Portugal

== Relegation play-off ==
The 16th-placed team faces the 3rd-placed team of the Liga Portugal 2 for the final place in the 2027–28 Primeira Liga.

=== Summary ===
Team 1	Agg.	Team 2	1st leg	2nd leg
16th-placed of Primeira Liga		3rd-placed of Liga Portugal 2		

=== Matches ===
First leg

29 May 2027	16th-placed of Primeira Liga	v	3rd-placed of Liga Portugal 2
--:-- UTC+0

Second leg

6 June 2027	3rd-placed of Liga Portugal 2	v	16th-placed of Primeira Liga
--:-- UTC+0

== Season statistics ==
As of matches played 2 November 2026

=== Top goalscorers ===
Rank	Player	Club	Goals
1	(Greece) Vangelis Pavlidis	Benfica	10
2	(Colombia) Luis Suárez	Sporting	8
3	(Argentina) Gianluca Prestianni	Benfica	6
4	(Spain) Iván Barbero	Arouca	5
4	(Brazil) André Clóvis	Académico de Viseu	5
4	(Greece) Georgios Koutsias	Famalicão	5
4	(Portugal) Gonçalo Paciência	Santa Clara	5
4	(Spain) Borja Sainz	Porto	5
4	(Spain) Gabri Veiga	Porto	5
4	(Spain) Pau Víctor	Braga	5

==== Hat-tricks ====
Player	For	Against	Result	Date
(Greece) Vangelis Pavlidis	Benfica	Casa Pia	7–0 (A)	17 August 2026

=== Clean sheets ===
Rank	Player	Club	Clean sheets
1	(Uruguay) Ignacio de Arruabarrena	Arouca	6
1	(Portugal) Diogo Costa	Porto	6
3	(Brazil) Lucas França	Santa Clara	5
3	(Brazil) Lucão	Gil Vicente	5
3	(Portugal) Samuel Soares	Benfica	5
6	(Portugal) Bernardo Fontes	Braga	4
7	(Montenegro) Lazar Carević	Famalicão	3
8	(Brazil) Ewerton	Académico de Viseu	2
8	(Brazil) Lucas Furtado	Vitória de Guimarães	2
8	(Italy) Renato Marin	Nacional	2
8	(Portugal) Rui Silva	Sporting	2
8	(Poland) Oliwier Zych	Vitória de Guimarães	2

=== Discipline ===
==== Player ====
- Most yellow cards:
- Most red cards:

==== Club ====
- Most yellow cards:
- Most red cards:

== Awards ==
=== Monthly awards ===
Month	Player of the Month		Young Player of the Month		Goalkeeper of the Month		Defender of the Month		Midfielder of the Month		Forward of the Month		Manager of the Month		Goal of the Month		References
Month	Player	Club	Player	Club	Player	Club	Player	Club	Player	Club	Player	Club	Manager	Club	Player	Club	References
August	(Spain) Gabri Veiga	Porto	(Portugal) Flávio Gonçalves	Sporting	(Portugal) Diogo Costa	Porto	(Poland) Jakub Kiwior	Porto	(Spain) Gabri Veiga	Porto	(Greece) Vangelis Pavlidis	Benfica	(Portugal) Vasco Seabra	Arouca	(Portugal) Francisco Domingues	Moreirense	

== Attendances ==
=== Overall ===
Pos	Team	Total	High	Low	Average	Change
1	Académico de Viseu	0	0	0	0	n/a
2	Alverca	0	0	0	0	n/a
3	Arouca	0	0	0	0	n/a
4	Benfica	0	0	0	0	n/a
5	Braga	0	0	0	0	n/a
6	Casa Pia	0	0	0	0	n/a
7	Estoril Praia	0	0	0	0	n/a
8	Estrela da Amadora	0	0	0	0	n/a
9	Famalicão	0	0	0	0	n/a
10	Gil Vicente	0	0	0	0	n/a^{†}
11	Marítimo	0	0	0	0	n/a
12	Moreirense	0	0	0	0	n/a
13	Nacional	0	0	0	0	n/a
14	Porto	0	0	0	0	n/a
15	Rio Ave	0	0	0	0	n/a
16	Santa Clara	0	0	0	0	n/a
17	Sporting CP	0	0	0	0	n/a
18	Vitória de Guimarães	0	0	0	0	n/a
	League total	0	0	0	0	n/a

Source: Liga Portugal
Notes:
^{†} Teams played previous season in Liga Portugal 2

=== Home match played ===
As of Matchday 1

Team \ Match played	1	2	3	4	5	6	7	8	9	10	11	12	13	14	15	16	17	Total
Académico de Viseu																		
Alverca																		
Arouca																		
Benfica																		
Braga																		
Casa Pia																		
Estoril Praia																		
Estrela da Amadora																		
Famalicão																		
Gil Vicente																		
Moreirense																		
Marítimo																		
Nacional																		
Porto																		
Rio Ave																		
Santa Clara																		
Sporting CP																		
Vitória de Guimarães																		
League total																		

Source: Liga Portugal

== Number of teams by district ==
Rank	District Football Associations	Number	Teams
1	Lisbon	6	Alverca, Benfica, Casa Pia, Estoril Praia, Estrela da Amadora and Sporting CP
2	Braga	5	Braga, Famalicão, Gil Vicente, Moreirense and Vitória de Guimarães
3	Madeira	2	Marítimo and Nacional
3	Porto	2	Porto and Rio Ave
5	Aveiro	1	Arouca
5	Ponta Delgada	1	Santa Clara
5	Viseu	1	Académico de Viseu

== See also ==
- 2026–27 Liga Portugal 2
- 2026–27 Liga 3
- 2026–27 Campeonato de Portugal
- 2026–27 Taça da Liga
- 2026–27 Taça de Portugal
