= 2020–21 Primeira Liga =

87th season of top-tier Portuguese football

Primeira Liga
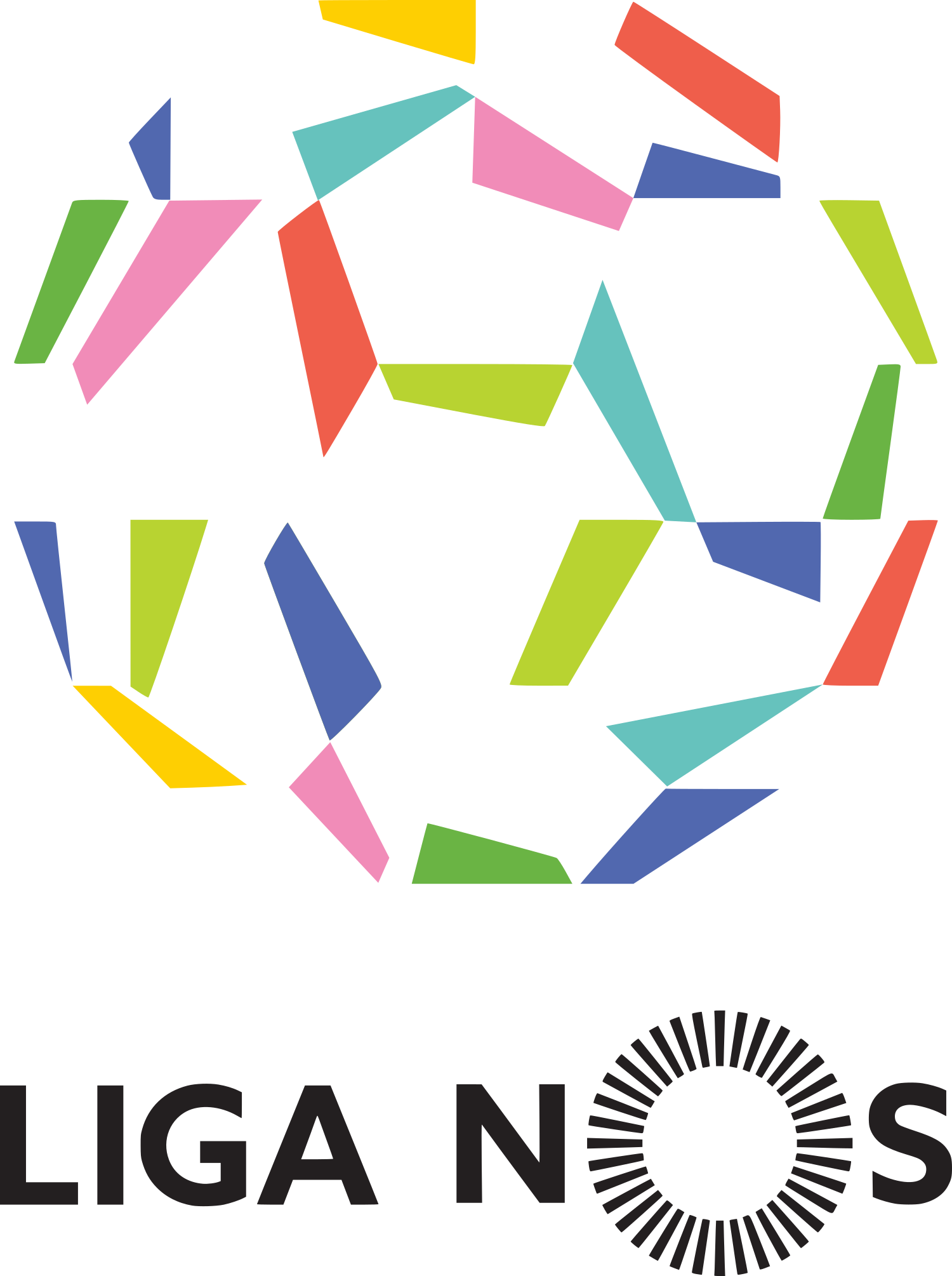
- Season: 2020–21
- Dates: 18 September 2020 – 19 May 2021
- Champions: Sporting CP; 19th title
- Relegated: Rio Ave; Farense; Nacional
- Champions League: Sporting CP; Porto; Benfica
- Europa League: Braga
- Europa Conference League: Paços de Ferreira; Santa Clara
- Matches: 306
- Goals: 739 (2.42 per match)
- Best player: Sebastián Coates (Sporting CP)
- Top goalscorer: Pedro Gonçalves (23 goals)
- Best goalkeeper: Antonio Adán (19 clean sheets)
- Biggest home win: Sporting CP 4–0 Tondela (1 November 2020); Santa Clara 5–1 Nacional (11 April 2021); Porto 5–1 Farense (10 May 2021); Porto 4–0 Belenenses SAD (19 May 2021); Sporting CP 5–1 Marítimo (19 May 2021); Santa Clara 4–0 Farense (19 May 2021)
- Biggest away win: Boavista 0–5 Porto (26 September 2020); Paços de Ferreira 0–5 Benfica (10 April 2021)
- Highest scoring: Porto 4–3 Tondela (5 December 2020); Benfica 4–3 Sporting CP (15 May 2021)
- Longest winning run: 7 matches Porto
- Longest unbeaten run: 32 matches (record); Sporting CP
- Longest winless run: 10 matches Nacional
- Longest losing run: 10 matches Nacional
- Highest attendance: 932; Santa Clara 1–2 Sporting CP (24 October 2020) (Note: Due to the COVID-19 pandemic in Portugal, the matches that were not played behind closed doors, were allowed to be played with limited attendance.)
- Lowest attendance: 0 (Note: All league matches played were played behind closed doors without any spectators due to the COVID-19 pandemic in Portugal, with the exception being four Santa Clara's home matches, Tondela against Portimonense and Farense against Rio Ave)

The 2020–21 Primeira Liga (also known as Liga NOS for sponsorship reasons) was the 87th season of the Primeira Liga, the top professional league for Portuguese association football clubs. The season started later than usual, on 18 September 2020, due to the delayed end of the previous season caused by the COVID-19 pandemic, and it concluded on 19 May 2021.

This was the fourth Primeira Liga season to use video assistant referee (VAR). As was the case at the end of the previous season, there were limited or no attendance in the stadiums besides each team's staff and personnel.

Porto were the defending champions. Nacional and Farense were promoted from the second-tier 2019–20 LigaPro by decision of the Liga Portuguesa de Futebol Profissional, after the suspension of the 2019–20 LigaPro due to the COVID-19 pandemic in Portugal. They replaced Desportivo das Aves and Vitória de Setúbal, who were relegated to the 2020–21 Campeonato de Portugal.

On 11 May 2021, Sporting CP secured a 19th title after a 1–0 home win against Boavista, their first title since the 2001–02 season. It was also the first title since that season not being won by either Benfica or Porto.

Since Portugal ascended from seventh to sixth place in the UEFA association coefficient rankings at the end of 2019–20 season, the three best-ranked teams could qualify for the UEFA Champions League (the champions and runners-up entered directly into the group stage, and the third placed team entered the third qualifying round). The fourth and fifth-placed teams would qualified respectively to the UEFA Europa Conference League play-off and third qualifying rounds.

== Effects of the COVID-19 pandemic ==
Due to the COVID-19 pandemic in Portugal, since March 2020, in contrast with various European leagues, the Primeira Liga began playing matches behind closed doors. On 13 September, Sporting confirmed that three players had tested positive for coronavirus, leading their pre-season match against Napoli to be cancelled due to the orders of the Portuguese Ministry of Health. The following day, Sporting confirmed that four players and a member of their staff had tested positive for coronavirus. Meanwhile, Gil Vicente confirmed that fifteen players had tested positive for coronavirus, leading also their pre-season match against Vitória de Guimarães to be cancelled. Three days later, Sporting confirmed that their manager Ruben Amorim and another player tested positive for coronavirus, with both going into self-isolation. On 17 September, it was announced that the Gil Vicente and Sporting fixture on matchday 1 would be postponed, following direct orders from the Portuguese Ministry of Health, after it was confirmed that Gil Vicente had four more positive cases of coronavirus.

On 3 October, Santa Clara faced Gil Vicente on matchday 3 at the Estádio de São Miguel, in Ponta Delgada, Azores, in a match, which was the first one to allow spectators in Portugal, with the stadium being limited to 10% of its capacity (1,000 spectators). Ten days later, it was announced that Paços de Ferreira's manager Pepa had tested positive for COVID-19, leading him and his staff being placed in quarantine as a preventive measure, forcing him to miss Paços de Ferreira's match against Santa Clara on October 18 at matchday 4.

On matchday 5, played between 23 and 26 October, there were three matches in which spectatores were allowed: Tondela against Portimonense at Estádio João Cardoso, Santa Clara against Sporting at the Estádio de São Miguel (with spectators being allowed for the second consecutive match) and Farense against Rio Ave at Estádio Algarve, where Farense played their first three home matches, instead of their regular home stadium Estádio de São Luís, due to a turf change. Like the match against Gil Vicente, Santa Clara match was played with the stadium capacity limited to 10%, as the other two matches were limited to 15% (approximately 750 and 4,500 spectators in Estádio João Cardoso and Estádio Algarve, respectively).

Santa Clara announced on February 20 that spectators will be allowed in Estádio de São Miguel, for the third time this season, in the match against Paços de Ferreira on matchday 21, played one week later on 27 February. This time, one third of the stadium's maximum capacity was allowed.

== Teams ==
Eighteen teams competed in the league – the top sixteen teams from the previous season and two teams promoted from the LigaPro. Nacional and Farense were promoted on 5 May 2020 by decision of the Liga Portuguesa de Futebol Profissional, after the suspension of the 2019–20 LigaPro due to the COVID-19 pandemic in Portugal. This decision was made based on UEFA's recommendations, focusing on sporting merit, as these teams were in first and second place of the LigaPro, respectively, at the time of cancellation.

Nacional came back to the top division one season after being relegated, while Farense secured their return after an 18-year absence. They replaced Desportivo das Aves and Vitória de Setúbal, who were relegated after three and sixteen seasons in the top flight, respectively.

=== Stadia and locations ===
Location of teams in 2020–21 Primeira Liga (Mainland)
Location of teams in 2020–21 Primeira Liga (Madeira)
Location of teams in 2020–21 Primeira Liga (Azores)

Team	Location	Stadium	Capacity	2019–20
B-SAD	Oeiras	Estádio Nacional	37,593	15th
Benfica	Lisbon	Estádio da Luz	64,642	2nd
Boavista	Porto	Estádio do Bessa	28,263	12th
Braga	Braga	Estádio Municipal de Braga	30,286	3rd
Famalicão	Vila Nova de Famalicão	Estádio Municipal 22 de Junho	5,307	6th
Farense	Faro	Estádio de São Luís	7,000	2nd (LP)
Gil Vicente	Barcelos	Estádio Cidade de Barcelos	12,504	10th
Marítimo	Funchal	Estádio do Marítimo	10,932	11th
Nacional	Funchal	Estádio da Madeira	5,132	1st (LP)
Moreirense	Moreira de Cónegos	Parque de Jogos Comendador; Joaquim de Almeida Freitas	6,153	8th
Paços de Ferreira	Paços de Ferreira	Estádio Capital do Móvel	9,076	13th
Portimonense	Portimão	Estádio Municipal de Portimão	6,204	17th
Porto	Porto	Estádio do Dragão	50,033	1st
Rio Ave	Vila do Conde	Estádio dos Arcos	9,065	5th
Santa Clara	Ponta Delgada	Estádio de São Miguel	13,277	9th
Sporting CP	Lisbon	Estádio José Alvalade	50,095	4th
Tondela	Tondela	Estádio João Cardoso	5,000	14th
Vitória de Guimarães	Guimarães	Estádio D. Afonso Henriques	30,000	7th

=== Personnel and sponsors ===
Team	Manager	Captain	Kit Manufacturer	Main Sponsor
B-SAD	(Portugal) Petit	(Portugal) Silvestre Varela	(Portugal) Lacatoni	(United Kingdom) Betway Group
Benfica	(Portugal) Jorge Jesus	(Brazil) Jardel	(Germany) Adidas	(United Arab Emirates) Emirates
Boavista	(Portugal) Jesualdo Ferreira	(Spain) Javi García	(Spain) Kelme	(Portugal) VITO Tools
Braga	(Portugal) Carlos Carvalhal	(Brazil) Fransérgio	(Denmark) Hummel	(Greece) Betano
Famalicão	(Portugal) Ivo Vieira	(Brazil) Gustavo Assunção	(Italy) Macron	(Portugal) Porminho
Farense	(Portugal) Jorge Costa	(Brazil) Cássio Scheid	(Germany) Adidas	(United States) McDonald's
Gil Vicente	(Portugal) Ricardo Soares	(Portugal) Rúben Fernandes	(Portugal) Lacatoni	(Portugal) Las Kasas
Marítimo	(Spain) Julio Velázquez	(Portugal) Edgar Costa	(United States) Nike	(Greece) Betano
Nacional	(Portugal) Manuel Machado	(Portugal) Rúben Micael	(Denmark) Hummel	(Spain) Santander
Moreirense	(Portugal) Vasco Seabra	(Portugal) João Aurélio	(Portugal) CDT	
Paços de Ferreira	(Portugal) Pepa	(Brazil) Marcelo	(Spain) Joma	(Spain) Aldro Energy
Portimonense	(Portugal) Paulo Sérgio	(Brazil) Dener	(Japan) Mizuno	(Portugal) McDonald's
Porto	(Portugal) Sérgio Conceição	(Portugal) Pepe	(United States) New Balance	(Portugal) MEO
Rio Ave	(Portugal) Miguel Cardoso	(Portugal) Tarantini	(United States) Nike	(Portugal) MEO
Santa Clara	(Portugal) Daniel Ramos	(Iraq) Osama Rashid	(Spain) Kelme	(Spain) Santander
Sporting CP	(Portugal) Ruben Amorim	(Uruguay) Sebastián Coates	(United States) Nike	(Greece) Betano
Tondela	(Spain) Pako Ayestarán	(Portugal) Ricardo Alves	(Portugal) CDT	(Portugal) Cabriz
Vitória de Guimarães	(Portugal) Moreno	(Portugal) André André	(Italy) Macron	

=== Managerial changes ===
Team	Outgoing manager	Manager	Date of vacancy	Pos in table	Incoming manager	Date of appointment	Ref.
Santa Clara	(Portugal) João Henriques	Mutual consent	24 July 2020	Pre-season	(Portugal) Daniel Ramos	28 July 2020	
Vitória de Guimarães	(Portugal) Ivo Vieira	Mutual consent	24 July 2020	Pre-season	(Portugal) Tiago Mendes	28 July 2020	
Boavista	(Portugal) Daniel Ramos	Mutual consent	25 July 2020	Pre-season	(Portugal) Vasco Seabra	30 July 2020	
Rio Ave	(Portugal) Carlos Carvalhal	Mutual consent	25 July 2020	Pre-season	(Portugal) Mário Silva	30 July 2020	
Marítimo	(Portugal) José Gomes	Signed for Almería	27 July 2020	Pre-season	(Angola) Lito Vidigal	30 July 2020	
Braga	(Portugal) Artur Jorge	End of caretaker role	28 July 2020	Pre-season	(Portugal) Carlos Carvalhal	28 July 2020	
Benfica	(Portugal) Nélson Veríssimo	End of caretaker role	1 August 2020	Pre-season	(Portugal) Jorge Jesus	3 August 2020	
Tondela	(Spain) Natxo González	Mutual Consent	5 August 2020	Pre-season	(Spain) Pako Ayestarán	9 August 2020	
Vitória de Guimarães	(Portugal) Tiago Mendes	Mutual Consent	8 October 2020	11th	(Portugal) João Henriques	13 October 2020	
Moreirense	(Portugal) Ricardo Soares	Resigned	9 November 2020	9th	(Portugal) César Peixoto	10 November 2020	
Gil Vicente	(Portugal) Rui Almeida	Sacked	11 November 2020	17th	(Portugal) Ricardo Soares	13 November 2020	
Marítimo	(Angola) Lito Vidigal	Sacked	4 December 2020	17th	(Brazil) Milton Mendes	5 December 2020	
Boavista	(Portugal) Vasco Seabra	Sacked	8 December 2020	15th	(Portugal) Daniel Gonçalves (Caretaker)	8 December 2020	
Boavista	(Portugal) Daniel Gonçalves (Caretaker)	End of caretaker role	13 December 2020	15th	(Portugal) Jesualdo Ferreira	13 December 2020	
Rio Ave	(Portugal) Mário Silva	Sacked	30 December 2020	13th	(Portugal) Pedro Cunha (Caretaker)	30 December 2020	
Moreirense	(Portugal) César Peixoto	Resigned	2 January 2021	8th	(Portugal) Leandro Mendes (Caretaker)	2 January 2021	
Moreirense	(Portugal) Leandro Mendes (Caretaker)	End of caretaker role	5 January 2021	8th	(Portugal) Vasco Seabra	5 January 2021	
Rio Ave	(Portugal) Pedro Cunha (Caretaker)	End of caretaker role	29 January 2021	10th	(Portugal) Miguel Cardoso	29 January 2021	
Famalicão	(Portugal) João Pedro Sousa	Sacked	31 January 2021	16th	(Portugal) Silas	1 February 2021	
Farense	(Portugal) Sérgio Vieira	Mutual Consent	1 February 2021	17th	(Portugal) Jorge Costa	4 February 2021	
Famalicão	(Portugal) Silas	Mutual Consent	8 March 2021	17th	(Portugal) Ivo Vieira	8 March 2021	
Marítimo	(Brazil) Milton Mendes	Resigned	5 March 2021	18th	(Spain) Julio Velázquez	11 March 2021	
Nacional	(Portugal) Luís Freire	Sacked	21 March 2021	17th	(Portugal) Manuel Machado	22 March 2021	
Vitória de Guimarães	(Portugal) João Henriques	Sacked	5 April 2021	6th	(Portugal) Bino (Caretaker)	5 April 2021	
Vitória de Guimarães	(Portugal) Bino (Caretaker)	End of caretaker role	13 May 2021	8th	(Portugal) Moreno (Caretaker)	13 May 2021	

== League table ==
Pos	Team	Pld	W	D	L	GF	GA	GD	Pts	Qualification or relegation
1	Sporting CP (C)	34	26	7	1	65	20	+45	85	Qualification for the Champions League group stage
2	Porto	34	24	8	2	74	29	+45	80	Qualification for the Champions League group stage
3	Benfica	34	23	7	4	69	27	+42	76	Qualification for the Champions League third qualifying round
4	Braga	34	19	7	8	53	33	+20	64	Qualification for the Europa League group stage (Note: Braga qualified for the Europa League group stage by winning the 2020–21 Taça de Portugal. Since they would have qualified for the Europa Conference League third qualifying round by finishing fourth, the berth was awarded to the fifth-placed team (Paços de Ferreira), and the Europa Conference League second qualifying round berth reserved to the fifth-placed team was awarded to the sixth-placed team (Santa Clara).)
5	Paços de Ferreira	34	15	8	11	40	41	−1	53	Qualification for the Europa Conference League third qualifying round
6	Santa Clara	34	13	7	14	44	36	+8	46	Qualification for the Europa Conference League second qualifying round
7	Vitória de Guimarães	34	12	7	15	37	44	−7	43 (Note: Vitória de Guimarães are ranked ahead of Moreirense on head-to-head points: Vitória de Guimarães 4, Moreirense 1.)	
8	Moreirense	34	10	13	11	37	43	−6	43	
9	Famalicão	34	10	10	14	40	48	−8	40 (Note: Famalicão are ranked ahead of Belenenses SAD on head-to-head points: Famalicão 4, Belenenses SAD 1.)	
10	B-SAD	34	9	13	12	25	35	−10	40	
11	Gil Vicente	34	11	6	17	33	42	−9	39	
12	Tondela	34	10	6	18	36	57	−21	36 (Note: Tondela are ranked ahead of Boavista on head-to-head points: Tondela 4, Boavista 1.)	
13	Boavista	34	8	12	14	39	49	−10	36	
14	Portimonense	34	9	8	17	34	41	−7	35 (Note: Portimonense are ranked ahead of Marítimo on head-to-head points: Portimonense 4, Marítimo 1.)	
15	Marítimo	34	10	5	19	27	47	−20	35	
16	Rio Ave (R)	34	7	13	14	25	40	−15	34	Qualification for the Relegation play-offs
17	Farense (R)	34	7	10	17	31	48	−17	31	Relegation to Liga Portugal 2
18	Nacional (R)	34	6	7	21	30	59	−29	25	Relegation to Liga Portugal 2

Source: Liga Portugal
Rules for classification: 1) Points; 2) Head-to-head points; 3) Head-to-head goal difference; 4) Head-to-head away goals scored; 5) Goal difference; 6) Matches won; 7) Goals scored; 8) Play-off.
(C) Champions; (R) Relegated

== Relegation play-offs ==
The relegation play-offs took place on 26 and 30 May 2021.

All times are WEST (UTC+1).

Team 1	Agg.	Team 2	1st leg	2nd leg
Rio Ave	0–5	Arouca	0–3	0–2

26 May 2021
21:45

Arouca	3–0	Rio Ave
Pité 43'; Sema Velázquez 58'; André Silva 75'	Report

Estádio Municipal de Arouca, Arouca
Attendance: 0
Referee: João Pinheiro
30 May 2021
19:00

Rio Ave	0–2	Arouca
	Report	Arsénio 32'; Sema Velázquez 59'

Estádio dos Arcos, Vila do Conde
Attendance: 0
Referee: Hugo Miguel

Arouca won 5–0 on aggregate and were promoted to 2021–22 Primeira Liga; Rio Ave were relegated to 2021–22 Liga Portugal 2.

== Results ==
Home \ Away	BEL	BEN	BOA	BRA	FAM	FAR	GIL	MAR	MOR	NAC	PAC	PTM	POR	RAV	STA	SPO	TON	VSC
Belenenses SAD	—	0–3	0–2	2–1	1–2	1–1	2–1	2–0	0–0	2–1	0–2	1–0	0–0	0–0	0–2	1–2	2–0	1–1
Benfica	2–0	—	2–0	2–3	2–0	3–2	1–2	1–0	2–0	1–1	2–1	2–1	1–1	2–0	2–1	4–3	2–0	0–0
Boavista	0–0	3–0	—	1–4	3–0	0–1	1–2	0–1	1–0	0–1	2–0	1–0	0–5	3–3	1–1	0–2	1–1	0–1
Braga	1–1	0–2	2–1	—	1–0	1–0	1–0	2–1	2–1	2–1	1–1	2–1	2–2	3–0	0–1	0–1	4–2	3–0
Famalicão	0–0	1–5	2–2	2–2	—	0–0	0–1	2–1	0–2	3–0	2–0	0–1	1–4	1–1	1–0	2–2	2–2	0–1
Farense	0–1	0–0	3–1	1–2	3–3	—	3–1	2–1	1–2	0–1	1–1	1–1	0–1	0–1	1–1	0–1	1–0	2–2
Gil Vicente	0–0	0–2	1–2	1–1	0–3	0–0	—	0–1	1–2	2–0	1–2	1–0	0–2	2–0	1–0	1–2	1–1	1–2
Marítimo	1–0	1–2	0–0	1–0	0–4	1–0	0–1	—	0–2	0–0	0–3	1–2	1–2	1–0	1–2	0–2	2–1	0–0
Moreirense	2–2	1–1	1–1	0–4	3–0	2–0	1–1	2–1	—	2–2	0–1	2–2	1–1	1–1	1–0	1–1	2–3	2–2
Nacional	0–0	1–3	3–3	1–2	2–1	2–3	2–1	1–2	0–1	—	1–1	1–5	0–1	1–2	1–3	0–2	2–0	1–0
Paços de Ferreira	1–0	0–5	1–1	2–0	2–0	0–2	0–2	1–1	3–0	2–1	—	0–0	3–2	2–0	2–1	0–2	2–1	2–1
Portimonense	1–0	1–5	1–2	0–0	0–0	2–0	4–1	0–0	1–2	1–0	1–1	—	1–2	0–0	1–2	0–2	3–0	3–0
Porto	4–0	1–1	2–2	3–1	3–2	5–1	1–0	2–3	3–0	2–0	2–0	3–1	—	2–0	2–1	0–0	4–3	1–0
Rio Ave	0–0	0–3	0–0	0–0	0–1	2–0	0–2	1–3	2–0	0–0	1–1	3–0	0–3	—	1–2	0–2	2–1	0–0
Santa Clara	2–0	1–1	3–3	0–1	1–2	4–0	0–0	2–0	0–0	5–1	3–0	2–0	0–1	1–0	—	1–2	1–1	0–4
Sporting CP	2–2	1–0	1–0	2–0	1–1	1–0	3–1	5–1	2–1	2–0	2–0	2–0	2–2	1–1	2–1	—	4–0	1–0
Tondela	1–3	0–2	3–1	0–4	1–0	2–0	1–0	2–1	0–0	2–1	2–3	1–0	0–2	1–1	2–0	0–1	—	0–2
Vitória de Guimarães	0–1	1–3	2–1	0–1	1–2	2–2	2–4	1–0	2–0	3–1	1–0	1–0	2–3	1–3	1–0	0–4	1–2	—

Source: Liga Portugal
Legend: Blue = home team win; Yellow = draw; Red = away team win.
For upcoming matches, an "a" indicates there is an article about the rivalry between the two participants.

=== Positions by round ===
The table lists the positions of teams after each week of matches. In order to preserve chronological evolvements, any postponed matches are not included to the round at which they were originally scheduled, but added to the full round they were played immediately afterwards.

Team ╲ Round	1	2	3	4	5	6	7	8	9	10	11	12	13	14	15	16	17	18	19	20	21	22	23	24	25	26	27	28	29	30	31	32	33	34
Sporting CP	3	3	2	2	2	1	1	1	1	1	1	1	1	1	1	1	1	1	1	1	1	1	1	1	1	1	1	1	1	1	1	1	1	1
Porto	2	1	5	3	3	4	4	4	3	3	3	2	2	3	2	2	2	2	2	2	3	3	2	2	2	2	2	2	2	2	2	2	2	2
Benfica	1	2	1	1	1	2	3	3	2	2	2	3	3	2	3	4	4	4	4	4	4	4	4	3	3	3	3	3	3	3	3	3	3	3
Braga	14	17	12	6	4	3	2	2	4	4	4	4	4	4	4	3	3	3	3	3	2	2	3	4	4	4	4	4	4	4	4	4	4	4
Paços de Ferreira	8	12	15	13	14	8	5	5	6	6	6	6	6	5	5	5	5	5	5	5	5	5	5	5	5	5	5	5	5	5	5	5	5	5
Santa Clara	5	4	3	4	6	5	9	8	7	7	7	7	7	11	8	7	7	7	8	8	7	8	7	7	7	6	7	7	8	7	8	8	7	6
Vitória de Guimarães	13	15	11	5	7	6	7	6	5	5	5	5	5	6	6	6	6	6	6	6	6	6	6	6	6	7	6	6	6	6	6	6	6	7
Moreirense	4	7	9	11	5	9	11	14	13	11	8	10	10	7	7	8	8	8	7	7	8	7	8	8	8	8	8	8	7	8	7	7	8	8
Famalicão	18	6	7	9	9	12	10	10	11	8	12	14	16	13	15	16	17	17	18	16	16	17	17	14	14	14	15	13	12	14	13	10	9	9
Belenenses SAD	6	10	8	8	15	14	13	13	8	10	14	12	14	17	11	14	13	13	13	10	10	12	10	10	13	13	12	11	10	11	9	9	10	10
Gil Vicente	15	8	10	12	13	16	17	12	12	15	11	11	12	16	17	18	12	14	16	14	15	16	13	11	10	10	10	12	13	13	11	12	11	11
Tondela	12	14	17	16	12	15	12	11	15	14	16	13	15	9	12	9	10	11	11	12	9	10	11	12	9	12	11	9	9	9	10	11	12	12
Boavista	7	16	14	17	17	13	15	16	16	16	17	17	17	18	18	15	18	18	17	17	18	14	15	17	15	15	14	15	16	16	16	16	15	13
Portimonense	11	13	16	14	16	17	18	15	17	18	18	16	18	12	13	13	15	15	12	13	13	11	12	13	12	9	9	10	11	10	12	13	14	14
Marítimo	17	9	4	7	11	11	14	17	18	13	10	8	8	8	9	10	11	12	15	18	17	18	16	18	18	16	16	16	15	12	14	14	13	15
Rio Ave	9	11	13	15	8	7	6	9	9	9	13	15	9	10	10	12	14	10	9	9	11	9	9	9	11	11	13	14	14	15	15	15	16	16
Farense	16	18	18	18	18	18	16	18	14	17	15	18	13	15	16	17	16	16	14	15	14	15	18	15	16	17	17	17	17	17	17	17	17	17
Nacional	10	5	6	10	10	10	8	7	10	12	9	9	11	14	14	11	9	9	10	11	12	13	14	16	17	18	18	18	18	18	18	18	18	18

Leader and Champions League group stage
Champions League group stage
Champions League third qualifying round
Europa League group stage
Europa Conference League third qualifying round
Europa Conference League second qualifying round
Relegation Play-off
Relegation to Liga Portugal 2

Source: Liga Portugal (in Portuguese)

== Statistics ==
=== Top goalscorers ===
Rank	Player	Club	Goals
1	(Portugal) Pedro Gonçalves	Sporting CP	23
2	(Switzerland) Haris Seferovic	Benfica	22
3	(Iran) Mehdi Taremi	Porto	16
4	(Spain) Mario González	Tondela	15
5	(Brazil) Carlos	Santa Clara	14
6	(Portugal) Sérgio Oliveira	Porto	13
7	(Guinea-Bissau) Beto	Portimonense	11
8	(Colombia) Mateo Cassierra	Belenenses SAD	10

=== Hat-tricks ===
Player	For	Against	Result	Date
(Spain) Mario González	Tondela	Moreirense	3–2 (A)	17 April 2021
(Portugal) Pedro Gonçalves	Sporting CP	Marítimo	5–1 (H)	19 May 2021

Notes

(H) – Home team
(A) – Away team

=== Top assists ===
Rank	Player	Club	Assists
1	(Iran) Mehdi Taremi	Porto	11
2	(Uruguay) Darwin Núñez	Benfica	10
3	(Brazil) Everton	Benfica	9
3	(Spain) Álex Grimaldo	Benfica	9
5	(Brazil) Otávio	Porto	8
6	(Mexico) Jesús Corona	Porto	7
6	(Honduras) Alberth Elis	Boavista	7
6	(Scotland) Ryan Gauld	Farense	7

=== Clean sheets ===
Rank	Player	Club	Clean sheets
1	(Spain) Antonio Adán	Sporting CP	19
2	(Argentina) Agustín Marchesín	Porto	16
3	(Poland) Paweł Kieszek	Rio Ave	11
3	(Russia) Stanislav Kritsyuk	Belenenses SAD	11
5	(Iran) Amir Abedzadeh	Marítimo	10
5	(Portugal) Bruno Varela	Vitória de Guimarães	10
5	(Brazil) Denis	Gil Vicente	10
8	(Brazil) Matheus	Braga	9
8	(Brazil) Jordi	Paços de Ferreira	9
8	(Brazil) Léo Jardim	Boavista	9
8	(Brazil) Luiz Júnior	Famalicão	9
8	(Brazil) Samuel Portugal	Portimonense	9
8	(Portugal) Marco Pereira	Santa Clara	9

=== Discipline ===
==== Player ====
- Most yellow cards: 13
  - (Argentina) Nicolás Otamendi (Benfica)
  - (Portugal) Fábio Pacheco (Moreirense)
- Most red cards: 2
  - (Portugal) Salvador Agra (Tondela)
  - (Nigeria) Chidozie Awaziem (Boavista)
  - (Portugal) David Carmo (Braga)
  - (Brazil) Júlio César (Nacional)
  - (Brazil) Rafael Defendi (Farense)
  - (Brazil) Fransérgio (Braga)
  - (Spain) Javi García (Boavista)
  - (Russia) Stanislav Kritsyuk (Belenenses)
  - (Brazil) Ygor Nogueira (Gil Vicente)

==== Club ====
- Most yellow cards: 102
  - Marítimo
- Most red cards: 10
  - Boavista

== Awards ==
=== Monthly awards ===
For the 2020–21 season, there were seven monthly awards in the Primeira Liga: best player, goalkeeper, defender, midfielder, forward, manager and goal of the month.

Month	Player of the Month		Goalkeeper of the Month		Defender of the Month		Midfielder of the Month		Forward of the Month		Manager of the Month		Goal of the Month	
Month	Player	Club	Player	Club	Player	Club	Player	Club	Player	Club	Manager	Club	Player	Club
September/October	(Portugal) Pedro Gonçalves	Sporting CP	(Portugal) Bruno Varela	Vitória de Guimarães	(Portugal) Pepe	Porto	(Portugal) Pedro Gonçalves	Sporting CP	(Brazil) Thiago Santana	Santa Clara	(Portugal) Jorge Jesus	Benfica	(Portugal) Bruno Jordão	Famalicão
November	(Portugal) Pedro Gonçalves	Sporting CP	(Brazil) Matheus	Braga	(Spain) Pedro Porro	Sporting CP	(Portugal) Pedro Gonçalves	Sporting CP	(Brazil) Rodrigo Pinho	Marítimo	(Portugal) Pepa	Paços de Ferreira	(Colombia) Luis Díaz	Porto
December	(Portugal) Sérgio Oliveira	Porto	(Spain) Antonio Adán	Sporting CP	(Spain) Pedro Porro	Sporting CP	(Portugal) Sérgio Oliveira	Porto	(Iran) Mehdi Taremi	Porto	(Portugal) Sérgio Conceição	Porto	(Portugal) Iuri Medeiros	Braga
January	(Iran) Mehdi Taremi	Porto	(Spain) Antonio Adán	Sporting CP	(Spain) Pedro Porro	Sporting CP	(Portugal) Bruno Costa	Paços de Ferreira	(Iran) Mehdi Taremi	Porto	(Portugal) Pepa	Paços de Ferreira	(Spain) Pedro Porro	Sporting CP
February	(Libya) Ali Al Musrati	Braga	(Spain) Antonio Adán	Sporting CP	(Uruguay) Sebastián Coates	Sporting CP	(Libya) Ali Al Musrati	Braga	(Iran) Mehdi Taremi	Porto	(Portugal) Ruben Amorim	Sporting CP	(Scotland) Ryan Gauld	Farense
March	(Switzerland) Haris Seferovic	Benfica	(Brazil) Helton Leite	Benfica	(Uruguay) Sebastián Coates	Sporting CP	(Portugal) Sérgio Oliveira	Porto	(Switzerland) Haris Seferovic	Benfica	(Portugal) Jorge Jesus	Benfica	(Guinea-Bissau) Beto	Portimonense
April	(Uruguay) Sebastián Coates	Sporting CP	(Spain) Antonio Adán	Sporting CP	(Uruguay) Sebastián Coates	Sporting CP	(Portugal) Pedro Gonçalves	Sporting CP	(Spain) Mario González	Tondela	(Portugal) Ruben Amorim	Sporting CP	(Portugal) André Almeida	Vitória de Guimarães

=== Annual awards ===
Annual awards were announced on 8 July 2021.

Award	Winner	Club
Player of the Season	(Uruguay) Sebastián Coates	Sporting CP
Manager of the Season	(Portugal) Ruben Amorim	Sporting CP
Goal of the Season	(Guinea-Bissau) Beto	Portimonense
Young Player of the Season	(Portugal) Pedro Gonçalves	Sporting CP
Top scorer	(Portugal) Pedro Gonçalves	Sporting CP
Neno Fair-Play Prize	(Colombia) Luiz Díaz	Porto
Club Fair-Play Prize	Moreirense	

Team of the Year

Team of the Year
Goalkeeper	(Spain) Antonio Adán (Sporting CP)			
Defence	(Spain) Pedro Porro (Sporting CP)	(Portugal) Pepe (Porto)	(Uruguay) Sebastián Coates (Sporting CP)	(Portugal) Nuno Mendes (Sporting CP)
Midfield	(Portugal) João Palhinha (Sporting CP)		(Portugal) Pedro Gonçalves (Sporting CP)	(Portugal) Sérgio Oliveira (Porto)
Attack	(Brazil) Carlos (Santa Clara)		(Switzerland) Haris Seferovic (Benfica)	(Iran) Mehdi Taremi (Porto)

== Number of teams by district ==
Rank	District Football Associations	Number	Teams
1	Braga	5	Braga, Famalicão, Gil Vicente, Moreirense and Vitória de Guimarães
2	Porto	4	Boavista, Paços de Ferreira, Porto and Rio Ave
3	Lisbon	3	Belenenses SAD, Benfica and Sporting CP
4	Faro	2	Farense and Portimonense
4	Funchal	2	Marítimo and Nacional
5	Ponta Delgada	1	Santa Clara
5	Viseu	1	Tondela
