= Gabi (footballer, born 2000) =

Portuguese footballer (born 2000)

Personal information
- Full name: Márcio Gabriel Ferreira Pereira
- Date of birth: 18 April 2000 (age 26)
- Place of birth: Guimarães, Portugal
- Position: Midfielder

Team information
- Current team: Casa Pia
- Number: 8

Youth career
- 2009–2020: Vitória de Guimarães

Senior career*
Years	Team	Apps	(Gls)
2020–2022	Pedras Salgadas	42	(2)
2022–2023	Fafe	28	(1)
2023–2026	Felgueiras	93	(1)
2026–	Casa Pia	5	(0)
- * Club domestic league appearances and goals as of 17:03, 25 October 2026 (UTC)

Márcio Gabriel Ferreira Pereira (born 18 April 2000), known as Gabi, is a Portuguese professional footballer who plays as a midfielder for Casa Pia.

== Career ==
Born in Guimarães, Gabi spent his youth career at hometown club Vitória de Guimarães. After two years at Pedras Salgadas in the Campeonato de Portugal, he joined Fafe in Liga 3 in 2022.

In 2023, Gabi joined Felgueiras, also in the third tier. He made 64 appearances over his first two seasons, with the first resulting in promotion to Liga Portugal 2, and in June 2025 he extended his contract for one more season. On 17 January 2026, he was sent off in a 1–0 home loss to Leixões; he scored his only league goal for the club on 15 February, in a 4–2 loss away to Benfica B.

On 10 July 2026, Gabi joined Casa Pia in the Primeira Liga. He moved on a free transfer as Filipe Coelho's first signing.
