= 2026–27 CS Universitatea Craiova season =

Universitatea Craiova
2026–27 season
- Manager: Filipe Coelho
- Stadium: Ion Oblemenco Stadium
- Superliga: 1st
- Cupa României: Group stage
- Supercupa României: Winners
- UEFA Champions League: Second qualifying round
- UEFA Europa League: Play-off round
- UEFA Conference League: League phase
- Top goalscorer: League: Simon Elisor (9); All: Assad Al Hamlawi (11)

The 2026–27 season will be the 79th season in the history of CS Universitatea Craiova and the 13th consecutive in Superliga. They will also compete in Cupa României, Supercupa României, and the Champions League.

== Transfers ==
=== In ===
Pos.	Player	Transferred from	Fee	Date	Source
MF	(Romania) Ștefan Bană	(Romania) Oțelul Galați	Loan return	30 June 2026	
FW	(France) Simon Elisor	(Portugal) Famalicão	€1,500,000	1 July 2026	
GK	(Romania) Alexandru Maxim	(Romania) FCSB	Undisclosed	1 July 2026	
GK	(Romania) Răzvan Sava	(Italy) Udinese	Undisclosed	1 July 2026	
DF	(Jamaica) Ronaldo Webster	(North Macedonia) KF Shkëndija	€400,000	1 July 2026	
FW	(Cape Verde) Heriberto Tavares	(Israel) Maccabi Netanya	Free	2 July 2026	

=== Out ===
Pos.	Player	Transferred to	Fee	Date	Source
GK	(Portugal) João Gonçalves	(Portugal) Nacional	End of contract	1 July 2026	
GK	(Romania) Silviu Lung Jr.		End of contract	1 July 2026	
DF	(Romania) Vasile Mogoș		End of contract	1 July 2026	
MF	(Romania) Florin Ștefan		End of contract	1 July 2026	

== Pre-season and friendlies ==
=== Summer ===
The team's pre-season preparation involves an initial stint at the club's Ilie Balaci Sports Base from 14 to 20 June, followed by a traditional 10-day training camp in Neustift im Stubaital, Austria.

21 June 2026 Friendly	Universitatea Craiova (Romania)	7–1	(Austria) FC Stubai	Austria
18:00 UTC+2	Băsceanu 2'; Al Hamlawi 3'; Etim 16'; Muntean 41', 49'; Nsimba 45'; Șerban 70'	Report	Goal

24 June 2026 Friendly	Universitatea Craiova (Romania)	1–1	(Azerbaijan) FK Sabah	Austria
18:00 UTC+2	Băsceanu 4'	Report	65'

29 June 2026 Friendly	Universitatea Craiova (Romania)	4–3	(Ukraine) Polissya Zhytomyr	Austria
17:00 UTC+2	Baiaram 58'; Mora 81'; Nsimba 87'; Rădulescu 90+8'		Emërllahu 15'; Filippov 33'; Fedor 60'

== Competitions ==
=== Overall record ===
Competition	First match	Last match	Starting round	Final position	Record							
Competition	First match	Last match	Starting round	Final position	Pld	W	D	L	GF	GA	GD	Win %
Superliga	18 July 2026		Matchday 1		15	10	3	2	34	10	+24	66.67
Cupa României	3 September 2026				2	1	1	0	3	2	+1	50.00
Supercupa României	12 July 2026		Final	Winners	1	0	1	0	1	1	+0	0.00
UEFA Champions League	8 July 2026	29 July 2026	First qualifying round	Second qualifying round	4	2	1	1	7	4	+3	50.00
UEFA Europa League	6 August 2026	27 August 2026	Third qualifying round	Play-off round	4	1	2	1	4	4	+0	25.00
UEFA Conference League	15 October 2026		League phase		3	2	1	0	6	2	+4	66.67
Total					29	16	9	4	55	23	+32	55.17

Source: Competitions

=== Superliga ===
Pos	Team	Pld	W	D	L	GF	GA	GD	Pts	Qualification
1	Universitatea Craiova	15	10	3	2	34	10	+24	33	Advances to Play-off
2	Dinamo București	16	10	3	3	32	12	+20	33	Advances to Play-off
3	Rapid București	15	9	4	2	24	14	+10	31	Advances to Play-off
4	Petrolul Ploiești	16	9	3	4	21	18	+3	30	Advances to Play-off
5	Universitatea Cluj	16	9	2	5	29	22	+7	29	Advances to Play-off

Updated to match(es) played on 21 November 2026. Source: LPF (in Romanian)
Rules for classification: 1) Points; 2) Head-to-head points; 3) Head-to-head goal difference; 4) Head-to-head goals scored; 5) Goal difference; 6) Goals scored; 7) Play-off.

===== Results by round =====
Round	1	2	3	4	5	6	7	8	9	10	11	12	13	14	15	16
Ground	H	A	H	H	A	H	A	H	A	H	A	H	A	H	A	A
Result	W	L	W	L	D	W	D	W	W	W	W	W	W	W	D	
Position																

A = Away; H = Home; W = Win; D = Draw; L = Loss

Matches

18 July 2026 1	Universitatea Craiova	4–0	UTA Arad

25 July 2026 2	Dinamo București	5–1	Universitatea Craiova

1 August 2026 3	Universitatea Craiova	4–0	Petrolul Ploiești

9 August 2026 4	Universitatea Craiova	0–1	Argeș Pitești

16 August 2026 5	Oțelul Galați	1–1	Universitatea Craiova

23 August 2026 6	Universitatea Craiova	3–1	Voluntari

31 August 2026 7	Rapid București	1–1	Universitatea Craiova

7 September 2026 8	Universitatea Craiova	4–0	Universitatea Cluj

13 September 2026 9	Corvinul Hunedoara	0–1	Universitatea Craiova

19 September 2026 10	Universitatea Craiova	5–0	FCSB

11 October 2026 11	Csíkszereda Miercurea Ciuc	0–1	Universitatea Craiova

18 October 2026 12	Universitatea Craiova	2–0	Farul Constanța

26 October 2026 13	Sepsi OSK	0–5	Universitatea Craiova

1 November 2026 14	Universitatea Craiova	2–1	Botoșani

8 November 2026 15	CFR Cluj	0–0	Universitatea Craiova

22 November 2026 16	UTA Arad	v	Universitatea Craiova

=== Supercupa României ===
12 July 2026 Final	Universitatea Craiova	1–1 (5–3 p)	Universitatea Cluj	Craiova
20:30				Stadium: Ion Oblemenco Stadium

=== UEFA Champions League ===
8 July 2026 First leg	Maxline Vitebsk (Belarus)	1–4	(Romania) Universitatea Craiova	Mezőkövesd, Hungary
19:00 UTC+2				Stadium: Mezőkövesdi Városi Stadion; Referee: Luka Bilbija (Bosnia and Herzegovina)

15 July 2026 Second leg	Universitatea Craiova (Romania)	1–0	(Belarus) Maxline Vitebsk	Craiova
20:30 UTC+3				Stadium: Ion Oblemenco Stadium
