= Sérgio Vieira =

Sérgio Vieira may refer to:

- Sérgio Vieira (football manager) (born 1983), Portuguese football manager
- Sérgio Vieira (racewalker) (born 1976), Portuguese race walker
- Sérgio Vieira de Mello (1948–2003), Brazilian diplomat
