= Sérgio Ferreira =

Sérgio Ferreira may refer to:

- Sérgio Henrique Ferreira (1934–2016), Brazilian physician and pharmacologist
- Sérgio Ferreira (footballer) (born 1989), Portuguese football manager and former player
- Sérgio Ferreira (writer) (1946–2006), Portuguese-Cape Verdean writer and filmmaker
