= Vítor Severino =

Portuguese football manager (born 1983)

Personal information
- Full name: Vítor José Santos Severino
- Date of birth: 16 August 1983 (age 43)
- Place of birth: Peniche, Portugal
- Position: Defender

Team information
- Current team: Arouca (manager)

Youth career
- Years: Team
- 1995–1999: Peniche
- 1999–2002: Atouguiense

Managerial career
- 2005–2010: Académica (youth)
- 2013–2014: Académica B
- 2014: Porto B (assistant)
- 2014–2015: Dragon Force (youth)
- 2015–2016: Porto (youth)
- 2016–2017: Rio Ave (assistant)
- 2017–2018: Chaves (assistant)
- 2018–2019: Vitória Guimarães (assistant)
- 2019–2021: Shakhtar Donetsk (assistant)
- 2021–2022: Al-Duhail (assistant)
- 2022–2023: Botafogo (assistant)
- 2023–2024: Al-Nassr (assistant)
- 2025: Al Wasl (assistant)
- 2025–2026: Grêmio (assistant)
- 2026–: Arouca

Vítor José Santos Severino (born 16 August 1983) is a Portuguese football manager, currently in charge of Arouca.

== Career ==
Born in Ferrel, Peniche, Severino played for local sides GD Peniche and GD Atouguiense as a youth before moving to Coimbra to become a manager. He then began working in the youth categories of Académica de Coimbra, before managing their reserve team in 2013.

In 2014, Severino met Luís Castro in an UEFA conference in Madrid, and subsequently joined FC Porto, initially as an assistant of José Guilherme in the B-team. He later worked in the youth categories of the club, before following Castro to Rio Ave FC in 2016, as his assistant.

Severino continued to work as Castro's assistant in the following years, at Vitória de Guimarães, FC Shakhtar Donetsk, Al-Duhail SC, Botafogo FR, Al-Nassr FC, Al Wasl FC and Grêmio. In May 2026, he also an interim head coach for one match at the latter, as Castro was suspended.

On 4 October 2026, Severino replaced Vasco Seabra as manager of Primeira Liga side FC Arouca. He led the club to three consecutive wins in his first three matches, including a Taça de Portugal qualification over CF Os Belenenses.
