= Pedro Rosas =

Portuguese footballer

Personal information
- Full name: Pedro Silva Rosas
- Date of birth: November 28, 2000 (age 25)
- Place of birth: Espinho, Portugal
- Height: 1.89 m (6 ft 2 1/2 in)
- Position: Left-back

Team information
- Current team: Casa Pia
- Number: 75

Youth career
- 2009–2011: Geração Paramos
- 2011–2019: Feirense
- 2019–2021: Vitória de Guimarães

Senior career*
Years	Team	Apps	(Gls)
2021–2022	Gondomar	23	(1)
2022–2023	Real	21	(1)
2023–2026	Felgueiras	53	(5)
2026–	Casa Pia	9	(0)
- * Club domestic league appearances and goals as of 17:58, 3 August 2026 (UTC)

Pedro Silva Rosas (born 28 November 2000) is a Portuguese footballer who plays as a left-back for Primeira Liga club Casa Pia.

== Early career ==
Rosas is a product of the youth academies of the Portuguese clubs Geração Paramos, Feirense, and Vitória de Guimarães. He began his senior career with Gondomar in the Campeonato de Portugal in 2021. On 30 June 2023, he joined Liga 3 club Felgueiras, and in his debut season helped them get promoted to Liga Portugal 2. On 9 June 2025, he extended his contract with Felgueiras until 2026. On 3 February 2026, he transferred to Casa Pia in the Primeira Liga.

== Club career ==
Rosas joined Felgueiras in the 2023–24 season, going on to establish himself as an undisputed starter over two and a half seasons in Liga Portugal 2, making 64 appearances and scoring 6 goals for the club. In the first half of the 2025–26 season alone, he scored 4 goals and provided 1 assist in 21 appearances.

== International career ==
Rosas was called up to the Portugal U19s for a training camp in January 2019.
