= Filipe Coelho =

Filipe Coelho may refer to:

- Filipe Coelho (football manager, born 1980), Portuguese football manager
- Filipe Coelho (football manager, born 1985), Portuguese football manager
