= Fábio Fortes =

Portuguese footballer

Personal information
- Full name: Fábio Fortes Moreira
- Date of birth: 8 March 1992 (age 34)
- Place of birth: Lisbon, Portugal
- Height: 1.86 m (6 ft 1 in)
- Position: Forward

Team information
- Current team: Florgrade
- Number: 91

Youth career
- 2002–2006: Sporting CP
- 2006–2011: Real Massamá

Senior career*
Years	Team	Apps	(Gls)
2011	Real Massamá	6	(0)
2011–2013	Vitória Guimarães B	5	(0)
2011–2012	→ Trofense (loan)	9	(0)
2012	→ Mirandela (loan)	11	(3)
2013–2014	Mirandela	26	(7)
2014–2015	Santa Maria	19	(3)
2015	Lusitano Vildemoinhos	7	(0)
2015–2016	Benfica Castelo Branco	31	(11)
2016–2018	Penafiel	74	(19)
2018–2020	Arouca	55	(25)
2020	Hermannstadt	12	(1)
2021–2022	Académica	10	(2)
2022–2023	Penafiel	22	(3)
2023–2024	Lusitânia	32	(10)
2024	Jiangxi Lushan	11	(1)
2025	Paredes	14	(1)
2025	Anadia	8	(1)
2025–2026	Leça	9	(1)
2026–	Florgrade	3	(0)
- * Club domestic league appearances and goals as of 6 September 2026

Fábio Fortes Moreira (born 8 March 1992) is a Portuguese professional footballer who plays as a forward for Campeonato de Portugal club Florgrade.

== Club career ==
Born in Lisbon, Fortes joined Sporting CP's academy at the age of 10. He finished his development at Real Massamá also in the capital's metropolitan area.

Fortes signed for Vitória de Guimarães in June 2011. He never represented the club officially, being loaned to Trofense and Mirandela and making his professional debut in the Segunda Liga with the former side.

After further third-division spells with Santa Maria, Lusitano de Vildemoinhos and Benfica e Castelo Branco, Fortes returned to the second tier in June 2016, on a two-year contract at Penafiel. He scored eleven goals in his first season to help his team to the fifth place, adding eight in the second.

Fortes and Arouca were relegated to division three at the end of 2018–19. On 8 March 2020, he scored four times in a 9–0 home rout of Ginásio Figueirense; the campaign, shortened due to the COVID-19 pandemic, ended in immediate promotion.

On 17 August 2020, Fortes joined Hermannstadt of the Romanian Liga I. He played his first match in top-flight football one week later in a 1–1 away draw against Dinamo București, scoring his first goal in his next appearance as the hosts drew 2–2 with Academica Clinceni.

Fortes returned to Portugal in summer 2021, agreeing to a one-year deal with Académica de Coimbra. On 27 June 2022, he rejoined Penafiel also in the second tier on a similar contract.

In the following seasons, save for a brief spell in the China League One, Fortes competed in the Portuguese lower leagues.

== Personal life ==
Fortes' younger brother, Carlos, was also a footballer and a forward.
