= Casa Pia A.C. =

Portuguese association football club

Casa Pia
- Nicknames: Os Gansos (The Geese); Casapianos (The ones from Casa Pia)
- Short name: Casa Pia
- Founded: 3 July 1920; 106 years ago
- Ground: Estádio Pina Manique, Lisbon
- Capacity: 6,000
- Owner: Robert Platek
- President: Victor Franco
- Head coach: Filipe Coelho
- League: Primeira Liga
- 2025–26: Primeira Liga, 16th of 18
- Website: casapiaac.pt
Home colours	Away colours

Casa Pia Atlético Clube, commonly known as Casa Pia, is a Portuguese multi-sports club founded in 1920 and based in Lisbon, Portugal, best known for its professional football team, that competes in the Primeira Liga. The club is named after Casa Pia, a Portuguese children's charity, and many of its athletes come from that institution. Its football stadium is Estádio Pina Manique, named in honor of Pina Manique, the founder of Casa Pia children's charity. Casa Pia AC was one of the most versatile Portuguese clubs, having played 25 sports, with the curiosity of having been the only one who practiced baseball regularly, beating the strong team of the American Colony on 4 July 1923 at Campo das Laranjeiras by 25–24.

On 18 December 1921, when Portugal made their international debut against Spain in Madrid, Casa Pia FC provided the squad with four players in a 1–3 loss, including Cândido de Oliveira, who was the team captain. Casa Pia promoted from Serie E of Terceira Divisão to Centre Group of Portuguese Second Division in 2009–10 season as champions. They were promoted again to LigaPro in 2019. After a hiatus of 83 years, the team were promoted to the Primeira Liga in the 2022–23 season.

== History ==
=== Early success ===
Although Casa Pia A.C. was officially founded on 3 July 1920, at the initiative of Cândido de Oliveira, Ricardo Ornelas, Tomás Marquez and David Ferreira (among others), the club's history dates back to 1893, when the Real Casa Pia de Lisboa football team was formed, the first team to defeat the so-called "invincible" team Carcavelos Club in 1898 in a historic victory that forever cemented the practice of football in Portugal.

On 3 October 1920, just a few months after its foundation, Casa Pia AC won its first-ever piece of silverware after beating Benfica 2–1, thus winning the Bronze Herculano Santos. The team was captained by Cândido de Oliveira, and the game was refereed by Cosme Damião.

In its debut season, Casa Pia AC won the Lisbon Regional Championship and the Lisbon Cup without registering a single defeat. And to these titles, Casa Pia added the triumph in the confrontation with the champion of the North, FC Porto, in the then-called Taça 27 de Julho. This game was the final rehearsal for the start of the Portuguese Championship which began in the following year.

At 17 months of age, Casa Pia had already participated in three tournaments abroad along with star player Afonso Alvito: Paris, San Sebastián, and Seville. The Casapianos was the first Portuguese team to play in Paris, playing at the Pershing Stadium in the city's Tournament at Christmas 1920, together with the Cercle Athlétic de Paris, Cercle Athlétic de Vitry, FC Cantonal (from Switzerland) and FC Espanya de Barcelona, who headed the rankings in the championships of their countries. In the opening game, Cercle de Paris beat Casa Pia 2–1, with the Casapian goal scored by Cândido de Oliveira. The trip to Seville took place on 16 October 1921, on the occasion of the inauguration of the Campo de Sports on Avenida de la Reina Victoria, facing Sevilla FC, who was wearing its current emblem on their chests for the first time, and despite the injury suffered by Spencer, who was forced to leave the pitch for much of the match, Sevilla FC achieved a clear victory over the Casapianos, prevailing by three goals to nil, goals scored by León, Kinké and Escobar.

The team's best player was Cândido de Oliveira, one of the founders of the club and the captain, who had grown up in Casa Pia since he was delivered there at the age of nine as an orphan, and who had previously played for Real Casa Pia de Lisboa, founded at the end of the 19th century. Oliveira was the main architect of the team's rise to football power in Lisbon, competing head-to-head against the likes of Benfica and Sporting CP, and largely thanks to his quality, the immediate impact of Casa Pia continued to be felt in the following seasons. In the first four years they competed, the 'Gansos' won the Lisbon Championship three times.

The reputation grew and, on 13 December 1925, the club was invited to face Benfica on the occasion of the inauguration of Estádio das Amoreiras, which was considered at the time the best stadium in the Iberian Peninsula. The Casapians faced Benfica in the 4 categories in front of 15 thousand people, and although it is defeated in the Quartas by 8–1, in Terceiras by 11–0, in Segundas by 4–2, they won in Primeiras by 3–1. Casa Pia AC was also the first team on the continent to travel to the Azores doing it so for free after being invited by Fayal S.C. to play 3 games there in favor of the victims of the 1922 earthquake in that archipelago.

=== Stagnation ===
In 1938–39, Casa Pia FC played in the inaugural editions of the National Championship and Taça de Portugal, which still today are the most important football competitions in Portugal. However, its participation in the National Championship in the 1938–39 season was the only one in which the club played in the First Division. Their ground, Campo do Restelo, was expropriated in 1939–40 by the Estado Novo for the exhibition of the Portuguese World. Without its own pitch until 29 August 1954, when the Pina Manique Stadium in Benfica was inaugurated, far from Belém and Casa Pia, the club wandered from one field to another, achieving a brilliant record in National Championships.

=== Recent history ===
In the 2020–21 season, Casa Pia registered its 71st participation in National Championships, starting in the 1938–39 season.

== Honours ==
- Campeonato de Lisboa
  - Champions (1): 1920–21
- Lisbon Cup
  - Champions (1): 1920–21

== Divisions ==
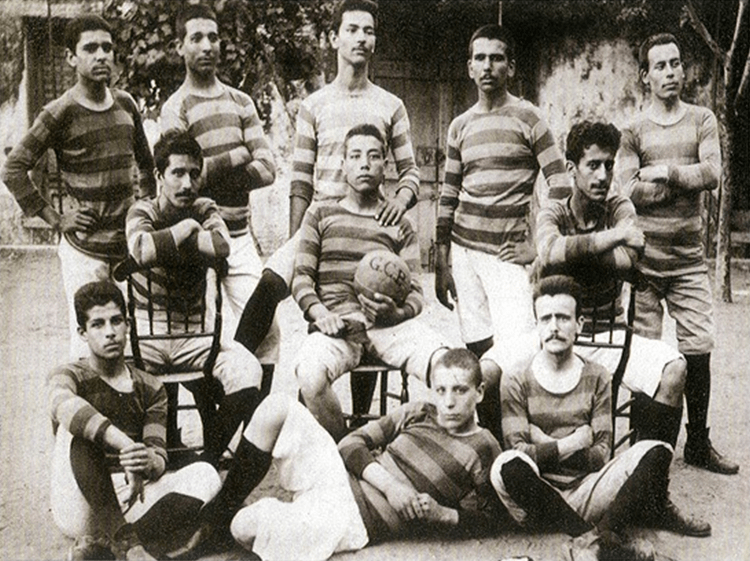
Casa Pia team in 1898

- Football
- Futsal
- Handball
- Karate
- Gymnastics
- Weightlifting
- Hockey
- Table tennis
- Wrestling
- Sport fishing

== Players ==
=== Current squad ===
As of 9 September 2026

Note: Flags indicate national team as defined under FIFA eligibility rules; some limited exceptions apply. Players may hold more than one non-FIFA nationality.

No.	Pos.	Nation	Player
1	GK	CRC	Patrick Sequeira
3	DF	ANG	Khaly
4	DF	POR	João Goulart
5	DF	POR	Abdu Conté
8	MF	POR	Gabi
9	FW	POR	Henrique Araújo
10	FW	POR	Rochinha
11	MF	BEL	Mo Salah
16	MF	ESP	Selvi Clua (on loan from Almería)
17	FW	FRA	Evans Maurin
18	DF	POR	André Geraldes (captain)
19	DF	URU	Kevin Prieto
20	FW	GAM	Alassana Jatta
21	FW	MAR	Aymen Zouin (on loan from Parma)
22	GK	POR	Daniel Azevedo

No.	Pos.	Nation	Player
24	MF	COL	Seba Pérez
27	DF	BRA	Kaique Rocha
29	FW	FRA	Jérémy Livolant
31	GK	POR	André Gomes
43	DF	BRA	David Sousa
44	DF	BRA	Lipe (on loan from Porto B)
59	MF	POR	Abdu Dafé
70	MF	POR	João Rego (on loan from Benfica)
75	DF	POR	Pedro Rosas
77	MF	BEL	Benjamin Pauwels (on loan from Leganés)
80	MF	GHA	Lawrence Ofori
90	FW	BRA	Cassiano
95	GK	CRO	Ivan Mandić
98	MF	BRA	JP

=== Out on loan ===
Note: Flags indicate national team as defined under FIFA eligibility rules; some limited exceptions apply. Players may hold more than one non-FIFA nationality.

No.	Pos.	Nation	Player
—	GK	ANG	Ricardo Batista (at Lusitano de Évora until 30 June 2027)
—	FW	GBS	Claudio Mendes (at Penafiel until 30 June 2027)

No.	Pos.	Nation	Player
—	FW	USA	Korede Osundina (at Muğlaspor until 30 June 2027)

== Records and statistics ==
The club has a single presence at the top level of Portuguese football.

2019–2020 season cut short due to COVID-19 global pandemic

Season	I	II	III	IV	V	Pts.	Pl.	W	T	L	GS	GA	Diff.	Notes
1938–39	8					2 pts	14	1	0	13	12	56	−44	Relegated
1995–96			11			44 pts	34	11	11	12	37	44	−13	
1996–97			...			29 pts	34	6	11	17	29	54	−25	
1997–98			17			29 pts	34	6	11	17	29	54	−25	Relegated
1998–99				5		61 pts	34	18	7	9	65	37	+38	
2002–03			18			34 pts	38	8	10	20	46	65	−19	Relegated
2003–04				1		75 pts	34	23	6	5	73	28	+45	Promoted
2004–05			5			59 pts	38	17	8	13	56	44	+12	
2005–06			13			41 pts	30	12	5	13	45	50	−5	Relegated
2006–07				12		34 pts	30	8	10	12	32	45	−13	Relegated
2007–08					1	67 pts	33	20	7	6	57	31	+26	Promoted
2008–09				4		41 pts	26	12	5	9	42	28	+14	
2011–12				6										
2018–19			1											Promoted
2019–20		18				11 pts	24	2	5	17	19	47	-28	
2020–21		9				43 pts	34	10	13	11	41	46	-5	
2021–22		2				68 pts	34	21	5	8	50	22	+28	Promoted

== Coaching staff ==
As of 14 November 2025

Position	Staff
Manager	(Portugal) Gonçalo Brandão
Assistant Coach	(Portugal) Alexandre Santana
Goalkeeping Coach	(Portugal) João Santos
Goalkeeping Coach	(Portugal) Stefan Olímpio
