= Vasco Seabra =

Portuguese football manager (born 1983)

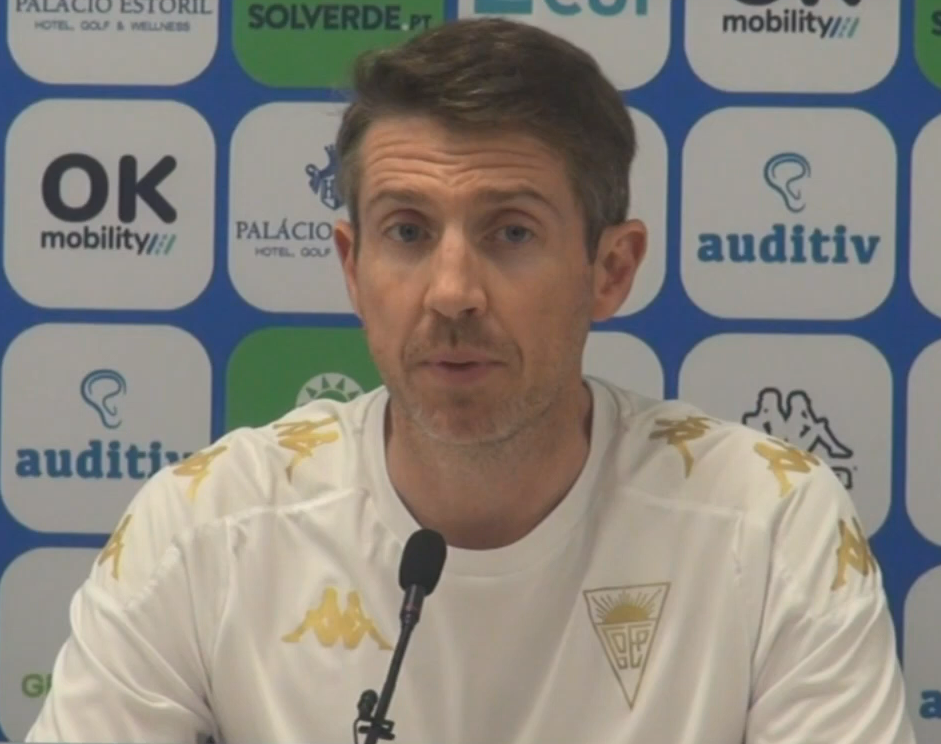
- Seabra in 2023

Personal information
- Full name: Vasco César Freire de Seabra
- Date of birth: 15 September 1983 (age 43)
- Place of birth: Paços de Ferreira, Portugal

Team information
- Current team: Rio Ave (manager)

Youth career
- Years: Team
- 1991–2002: Paços Ferreira

Managerial career
- 2010–2011: Leça (assistant)
- 2011–2012: Lixa (assistant)
- 2013: Lixa
- 2013–2016: Paços Ferreira (U19)
- 2016: Paços Ferreira (assistant)
- 2016–2017: Paços Ferreira
- 2018: Famalicão
- 2019: Estoril (U23)
- 2019–2020: Mafra
- 2020: Boavista
- 2021: Moreirense
- 2021–2022: Marítimo
- 2023–2024: Estoril
- 2024–2026: Arouca
- 2026–: Rio Ave

Vasco César Freire de Seabra (born 15 September 1983) is a Portuguese professional football manager, currently in charge of Primeira Liga club Rio Ave.

== Career ==
Born in Paços de Ferreira, Seabra played youth football for F.C. Paços de Ferreira as a forward and a central midfielder, retiring at the age of 18. After assistant spells, he started working as a manager in his own right in early 2013, with amateurs F.C. Lixa in the Porto Football Association.

Seabra was appointed at Paços de Ferreira in late November 2016, replacing Carlos Pinto. He won his first Primeira Liga game 2–1 against Boavista F.C. on 5 December, and ended the season in 13th. He was dismissed on 23 October 2017 after a 6–1 away loss to FC Porto, with the team in that same position and eliminated from the Taça de Portugal.

On 24 January 2018, Seabra returned to management with F.C. Famalicão in LigaPro, on a deal until the end of the following campaign. However, in June that year, he was replaced by Sérgio Vieira with a year left on his contract.

Seabra was hired on a year-long contract at C.D. Mafra on 31 May 2019, tasked with keeping them in the second division. Having finished in fourth, and also taken the club to the last 16 of the domestic cup by eliminating top-tier Moreirense F.C. away from home, he resigned.

In July 2020, Seabra returned to the top flight at Boavista F.C. on a two-year deal. He left on 8 December, having won once and drawn five of his nine matches. A month later, he signed for Moreirense until June 2022. His contract was terminated a year early following an eighth-place finish, and he was replaced by João Henriques.

On 13 November 2021, Seabra became C.S. Marítimo's second manager of the season after taking over from Julio Velázquez, with the side being placed second-bottom. He was himself relieved of his duties the following 5 September, after five losses in as many games to kickstart 2022–23.

Seabra was appointed at top-tier G.D. Estoril Praia on 25 September 2023, replacing Álvaro Pacheco who had been sacked the day before. On 3 November, he took the last-placed team to a 1–0 league win at Porto, repeating the feat the following month to oust the same opposition from the group stage of the Taça da Liga with a 3–1 home victory; he finished runner-up in the latter competition, beating S.L. Benfica on penalties in the semi-finals but losing the decisive match against S.C. Braga in the same fashion.

On 29 June 2024, Seabra left Estoril by mutual consent. Four months later, he took over F.C. Arouca in the same league. He led the side to 12th place, highlights being 2–2 draws against champions Sporting CP and runners-up Benfica.

On 16 September 2026, Seabra was named August's Coach of the Month, collecting three wins in four matches while receiving 46.43% of the votes. Two weeks later, however, he was signed by Rio Ave F.C. who paid his €1 million buyout clause.

== Managerial statistics ==
As of 19 September 2026

Managerial record by team and tenure
Team	From	To	Record							
Team	From	To	G	W	D	L	GF	GA	GD	Win %
Lixa	12 February 2013	20 May 2013	13	6	4	3	19	12	+7	46.15
Paços Ferreira	29 November 2016	23 October 2017	39	9	14	16	37	55	−18	23.08
Famalicão	24 January 2018	15 June 2018	17	5	3	9	16	25	−9	29.41
Mafra	31 May 2019	6 May 2020	29	13	9	7	42	30	+12	44.83
Boavista	30 July 2020	8 December 2020	10	2	5	3	11	15	−4	20.00
Moreirense	6 January 2021	4 June 2021	23	7	9	7	30	32	−2	30.43
Marítimo	13 November 2021	5 September 2022	28	8	7	13	32	42	−10	28.57
Estoril	25 September 2023	30 June 2024	37	12	7	18	52	57	−5	32.43
Arouca	29 October 2024	30 September 2026	69	23	18	28	91	108	−17	33.33
Career totals			265	85	76	104	330	376	−46	32.08
