= Sérgio Raimundo =

Portuguese football manager (born 1984)

Personal information
- Full name: Sérgio Miguel Marques Raimundo
- Date of birth: 26 August 1984 (age 42)
- Place of birth: Lisbon, Portugal
- Position: Midfielder

Team information
- Current team: Estoril (manager)

Youth career
- Years: Team
- 2000–2001: Trafaria

Managerial career
- 2008–2012: Benfica (youth)
- 2012–2014: Étoile Lusitana (youth)
- 2014–2015: Oeiras (youth)
- 2015–2016: SK Bischofshofen
- 2017: Diamante U20
- 2019–2021: Central Coast Mariners U20 (assistant)
- 2021–2023: Central Coast Mariners (assistant)
- 2023–2024: Hibernian (assistant)
- 2024–2025: Tottenham Hotspur (assistant)
- 2025–2026: Nottingham Forest (assistant)
- 2026: Estoril U23
- 2026: Estoril (caretaker)
- 2026–: Estoril

Sérgio Miguel Marques Raimundo (born 26 August 1984) is a Portuguese football manager, currently in charge of Estoril.

== Career ==
Born in Lisbon, Raimundo played for local sides CF Trafaria as a youth before starting to work in the youth categories of SL Benfica, as an assistant. In 2012, he moved to Senegal and worked at Étoile Lusitana, before returning to his home country in 2014 to manage the under-19 team of AD Oeiras.

Raimundo had his first senior managerial experience in 2015, after taking over Austrian club SK Bischofshofen. He was dismissed from the side on 21 March 2016, and subsequently moved to Brazil, where he worked as an under-20 coach for Diamante Sport Club.

In 2019, Raimundo moved to Australia and became an assistant of Nick Montgomery in the under-20 team of Central Coast Mariners FC. He became Montgomery's assistant in the main squad on 30 July 2021, and helped the side to win the 2022–23 A-League Men.

On 11 September 2023, Raimundo followed Montgomery to Scottish Premiership club Hibernian FC, also as his assistant. He left after the manager's dismissal the following 14 May, and the duo joined the staff of Ange Postecoglou at Tottenham Hotspur FC on 25 June, both as assistants.

After leaving Spurs on 12 June 2025, both Raimundo and Montgomery moved to Nottingham Forest FC under the same role on 10 September. The duo left Forest in October, after Postecoglou's dismissal.

On 7 July 2026, Raimundo joined GD Estoril Praia back in his home country, as manager of the under-23 team. On 16 October, he was named caretaker manager of the first team, after Vasco Matos was sacked.

Despite being in charge of the club on three winless matches, Raimundo was confirmed as manager of the Canarinhos on 8 November 2026.
