= João Gião =

Portuguese football manager (born 1986)

Personal information
- Full name: João Pedro Baptista dos Santos Brito Gião
- Date of birth: 9 August 1986 (age 40)
- Place of birth: Montemor-o-Novo, Portugal

Managerial career
- Years: Team
- 2008–2010: Mucifalense (youth)
- 2010–2012: Benfica (youth)
- 2012–2013: Atlético CP (assistant)
- 2013–2014: Benfica (youth)
- 2015: Sacavenense (assistant)
- 2016–2017: Pinhalnovense (assistant)
- 2017–2018: Melaka United (assistant)
- 2018–2019: Académica (assistant)
- 2020–2021: Grasshoppers (assistant)
- 2021–2022: Lausanne (assistant)
- 2023: Paços Ferreira (assistant)
- 2024–2025: Moreirense (assistant)
- 2025–2026: Sporting CP B
- 2026: Nacional

João Pedro Baptista dos Santos Brito Gião (born 9 August 1986) is a Portuguese football manager.

== Career ==
Gião was born in Montemor-o-Novo in the Évora District. In October 2018, he was hired at second-tier club Académica de Coimbra as an assistant to João Alves, specialising in training methodology. After having been a coordinator at FC Girondins de Bordeaux in France, he moved to Grasshopper Club Zurich as one of four Portuguese assistants to compatriot manager João Carlos Pereira in August 2020. Remaining in the Swiss Super League, he filled the same role at FC Lausanne-Sport in June 2021.

Returning to Portugal, Gião assisted César Peixoto at F.C. Paços de Ferreira and Moreirense FC. On 5 October 2024, due to the latter's suspension, he was in charge for a 1–0 home win over C.D. Santa Clara in the Primeira Liga.

On 27 March 2025, 38-year-old Gião was given his first job as a senior head coach, taking over at Sporting CP B after the departure of João Pereira to Alanyaspor. He joined a team in second place of the promotion series in Liga 3. With five wins and two draws in the last eight games of the season, he won automatic promotion as runners-up to Lusitânia Lourosa. He was elected Manager of the Month for August 2025, his first month in the second division, as his team won three of four matches, including a 1–0 win at S.C.U. Torreense in the opener. His team finished 13th, meeting their target of remaining in the division.

On 26 May 2026, Gião took over Nacional in the Primeira Liga, on a one-year deal. His debut on 10 August was a 2–2 draw away to Santa Clara. After following this with one win and two defeats, he left by mutual consent on 2 September with the Madeiran team in 9th.
