= Daniel Gonçalves =

Portuguese footballer and manager

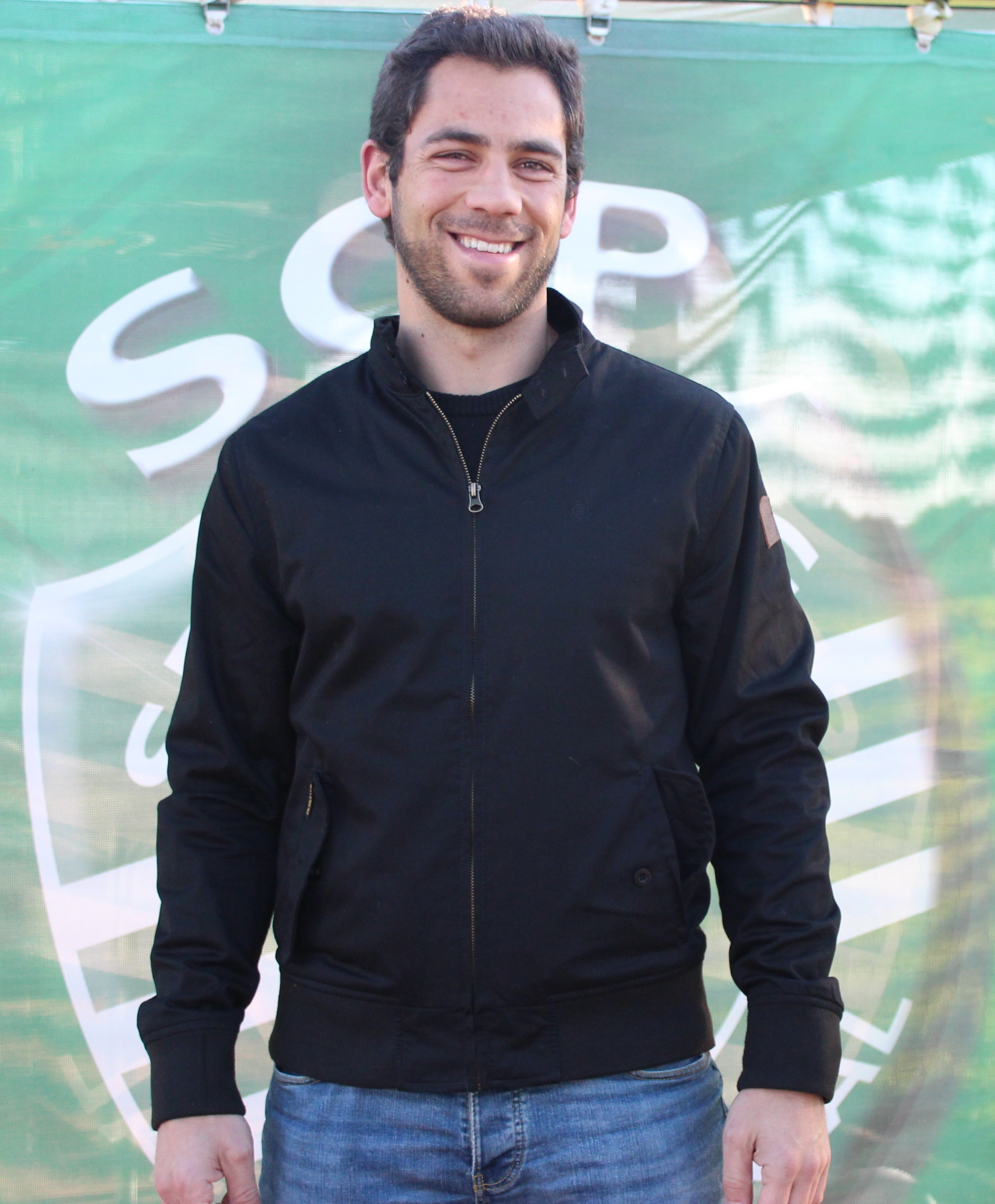

Personal information
- Full name: Daniel Rosendo Alves Gonçalves
- Date of birth: 30 December 1982 (age 43)
- Place of birth: Albufeira, Portugal
- Position: Midfielder

Team information
- Current team: Boavista (assistant)

Youth career
- 1992–2001: Ferreiras

Senior career*
| Years | Team | Apps | (Gls) |
| 2001–2003 | Ferreiras | | |
| 2009–2010 | Real Lumiar | | |
| 2010–2011 | Reguengo | | |
| 2014–2015 | Sabóia | | |

Managerial career
- 2002–2003: Ferreiras (youth)
- 2005: Farense (assistant)
- 2005–2006: S.L. Cartaxo (youth)
- 2006–2011: Sporting (youth)
- 2014: Real Cartagena (assistant)
- 2017–2018: Trofense (assistant)
- 2017: Trofense (interim)
- 2018–2019: Ferreiras
- 2019–2020: HB Køge (assistant)
- 2020: Santos (assistant)
- 2020–2021: Boavista (assistant)
- 2022–2023: Zamalek (assistant)
- 2023: Zamalek (assistant)
- * Club domestic league appearances and goals

Daniel Rosendo Alves Gonçalves (born 30 December 1982) is a Portuguese football coach and former player who played as a midfielder.

== Career ==
Born in Albufeira, Faro District, Algarve region, Gonçalves started playing football at F.C. Ferreiras' youth setup at the age of ten, and was known as Daniel Alves during his playing days. Promoted to the first team for the 2001–02 season, he represented the club for two campaigns before becoming the under-10 manager at the club in 2003.

Gonçalves subsequently worked at S.C. Farense and Sport Lisboa and Cartaxo and also had an internship spell at S.L. Benfica before joining Sporting Clube de Portugal in 2006. He worked with the latter club's youth setup for five full seasons before becoming a scout for the first team in 2011.

On 18 December 2013, Gonçalves was appointed assistant of José Dominguez in Categoría Primera A side Real Cartagena.

On 9 June 2015, Gonçalves joined Leonel Pontes' staff at Panetolikos F.C. in Greece, as a scout. He left the club in September after Pontes was dismissed, and subsequently moved to Equatorial Guinea to work at Cano Sport Academy as a technical coordinator.

Gonçalves was named Fernando Mira's assistant at C.D. Trofense in July 2014, but remained at the club when Mira was sacked in October. In December, he acted as interim for two Campeonato de Portugal matches before being replaced by Quim Berto.

On 21 June 2018, Gonçalves was appointed at the helm of former club Ferreiras, now as a first team manager. On 4 January 2020, he was named as one of Jesualdo Ferreira's three assistants at Campeonato Brasileiro Série A team Santos FC.
