= Sérgio Ferreira (footballer) =

Portuguese football manager and former player (born 1987)

Personal information
- Full name: Sérgio Ricardo Oliveira Ferreira
- Date of birth: 3 September 1987 (age 39)
- Place of birth: Porto, Portugal
- Position: Midfielder

Team information
- Current team: Alverca (manager)

Youth career
- 1998–2003: FC Foz
- 2003–2004: Candal
- 2004–2005: FC Foz

Senior career*
Years	Team	Apps	(Gls)
2005–2009	FC Foz		
2009–2010	Sport Progresso		
2010–2012	FC Foz		
2012–2013	Sport Progresso	20	(2)
2013–2014	FC Foz		

Managerial career
- 2009–2014: FC Foz (youth)
- 2014–2015: FC Foz
- 2016–2017: FC Foz (youth)
- 2017–2018: Dragon Force (youth)
- 2018–2020: Porto (youth)
- 2020–2022: Braga (assistant)
- 2022: Al Wahda (assistant)
- 2022–2023: Celta (assistant)
- 2023–2024: Olympiacos (assistant)
- 2024–2026: Porto (youth)
- 2026–: Alverca
- * Club domestic league appearances and goals

Sérgio Ricardo Oliveira Ferreira (born 3 September 1989) is a Portuguese former footballer who played mainly as a midfielder, and is the manager of Alverca.

== Career ==
Known as Serginho as a player, Ferreira represented FC Foz and Sport Progresso as a senior, and also started his managerial career with the former's youth categories. In 2014, he was named first team manager of Foz, before becoming a youth coordinator in the following year.

In 2017, Ferreira joined the structure of FC Porto, being in charge of the under-15 squad of affiliate team Dragon Force. On 9 July 2018, he was announced as Porto's under-15 team.

In 2020, Ferreira joined the staff of Carlos Carvalhal at Braga, as his assistant. He continued to work with the manager in the following years, at Al Wahda, Celta de Vigo and Olympiacos.

In July 2024, Ferreira returned to Porto to take over their under-19 team. On 29 June 2026, after winning the Campeonato Nacional de Juniores, he was appointed manager of Primeira Liga side Alverca.

== Honours ==
Porto U19

- Campeonato Nacional de Juniores: 2025–26
