= João Henriques (football manager) =

Portuguese football manager

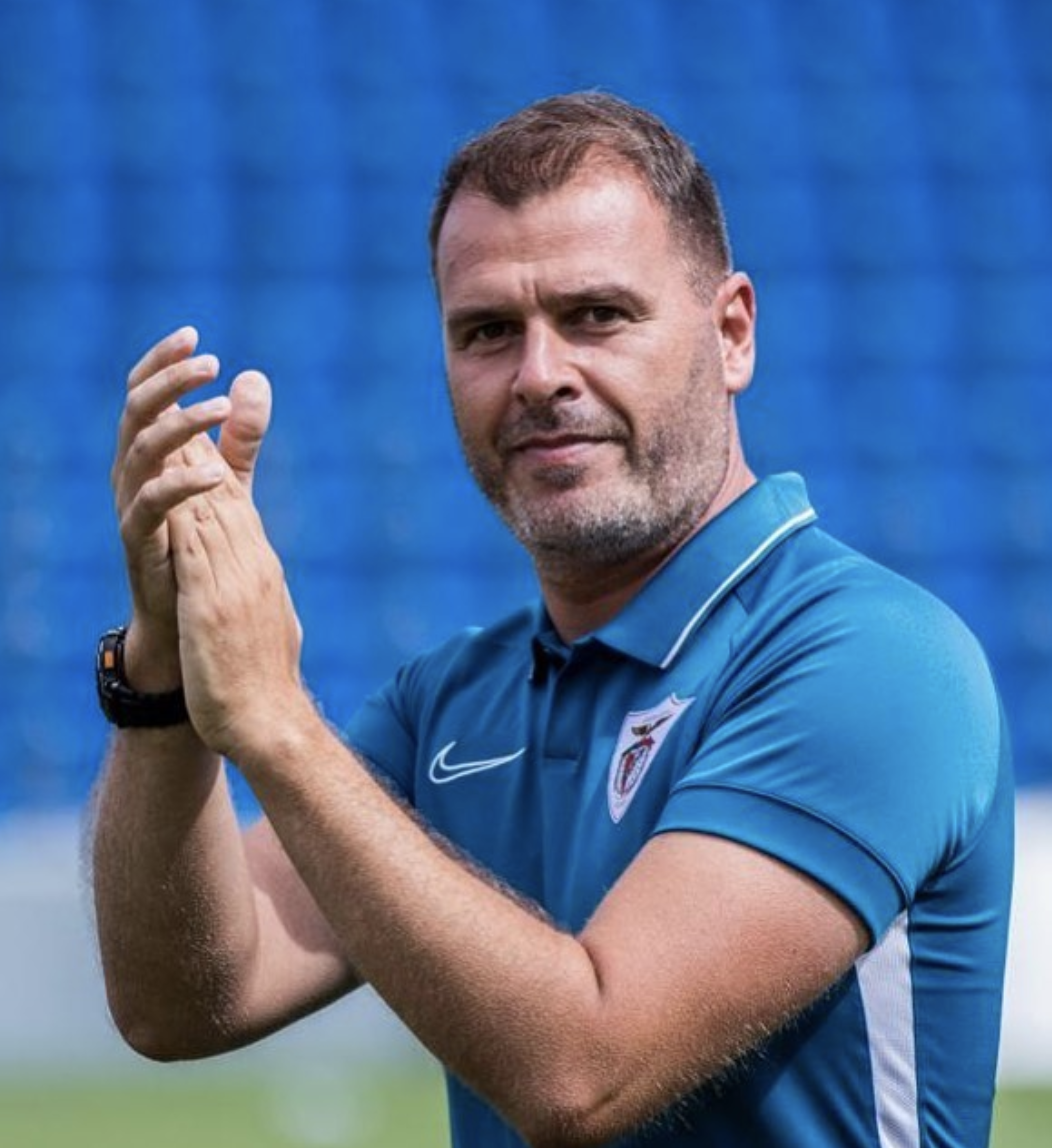
- Henriques with Santa Clara in 2019

Personal information
- Full name: João Alexandre Oliveira Nunes Henriques
- Date of birth: 31 October 1972 (age 54)
- Place of birth: Tomar, Portugal

Team information
- Current team: Nacional (manager)

Managerial career
- Years: Team
- 2003: Rio Maior
- 2004–2006: Riachense
- 2006–2008: Torres Novas
- 2008–2009: União Almeirim
- 2009–2011: Torres Novas
- 2015–2016: Fátima
- 2017–2018: Leixões
- 2018: Paços de Ferreira
- 2018–2020: Santa Clara
- 2020–2021: Vitória Guimarães
- 2021: Moreirense
- 2022: Marítimo
- 2023: Olimpija Ljubljana
- 2025: Radomiak Radom
- 2025–2026: AVS
- 2026–: Nacional

João Alexandre Oliveira Nunes Henriques (born 31 October 1972) is a Portuguese professional football manager who is currently in charge of Primeira Liga club Nacional.

Without having played football competitively, he started coaching in the Portuguese lower leagues before joining second-tier Leixões in 2017. He has managed five clubs in the Primeira Liga, most successfully at Santa Clara.

== Managerial career ==
=== Early career ===
Born in Tomar, Santarém District, Henriques spent his earlier career in the amateur leagues of Portugal. He then worked as assistant manager and in youth academies in Saudi Arabia and the United Arab Emirates. He returned home in July 2015 to take the job at Fátima, and won the Santarém Football Association's district league in his first season for promotion to the national third tier. He was dismissed on 1 November 2016 with the club fourth after four wins and a draw from seven games.

Henriques was assistant manager to Daniel Kenedy at Leixões of LigaPro, and succeeded him on 22 August 2017 after only three games of the season. The next day on his professional debut, the club from Matosinhos won by a single goal at home to neighbours Porto B; he dedicated the win to Kenedy.

=== Five Primeira Liga teams in five years ===
On 12 January 2018, Henriques moved to Primeira Liga club Paços de Ferreira on an 18-month deal to replace Petit. His first top-flight game was a 2–0 win at Aves on 21 January. He left on 21 May by mutual accord, after relegation.

On 31 May 2018, Henriques was named the head coach of newly promoted Santa Clara. He led the Azorean club to two consecutive best-ever 10th-place finishes, as well as a record points tally of 43; he left in July 2020 having ensured a third consecutive Primeira Liga season for the first time in their history.

Henriques returned to the Primeira Liga on 13 October 2020 at Vitória de Guimarães, as Tiago Mendes had left after three matches. On 5 April 2021, after a run of four consecutive defeats for the sixth-placed club, he was dismissed.

On 5 June 2021, Henriques signed with Moreirense for the upcoming campaign. He left by mutual accord on 1 December, with the team in 16th place.

Henriques became Marítimo's head coach on 8 September 2022 after Vasco Seabra was dismissed with the team sitting bottom after losing all five opening games. With only one win from ten games, he was sacked on 14 December, with the team in penultimate place and out of both domestic cups.

=== Olimpija Ljubljana ===
On 22 May 2023, Slovenian PrvaLiga champions Olimpija Ljubljana announced that Henriques would become their new head coach, replacing Albert Riera, in his first job outside of Portugal. He was officially announced on 1 June, signing a two-year contract. He won 2–1 at home in his first game on 11 July, against Valmiera in the UEFA Champions League first qualifying round, and by the same score in the second leg in Latvia eight days later.

Henriques, who had four compatriots in his squad, left by mutual accord on 13 October 2023, with the club in 3rd place after 11 games.

=== Radomiak Radom ===
On 8 January 2025, Henriques was unveiled as the new manager of Polish Ekstraklasa club Radomiak Radom. He signed a six-month deal with a one-year extension option, replacing his compatriot Bruno Baltazar who had signed with Caen ten days prior. After managing to avoid relegation, his contract was extended for another year in June 2025. On 30 October 2025, Henriques left Radomiak by mutual consent.

=== Return to Portugal ===
On 20 December 2025, Henriques returned to his homeland, being appointed as manager of AVS Futebol SAD, who sat bottom of the Primeira Liga table, on a contract until the end of the season.

On 26 October 2026, Henriques was presented as manager of C.D. Nacional also in the top tier.

== Managerial statistics ==
As of match played 16 May 2026

Managerial record by team and tenure
Team	Nat.	From	To	Record				
Team	Nat.	From	To	G	W	D	L	Win %
Leixões	(Portugal)	22 August 2017	11 January 2018	23	11	8	4	47.83
Paços de Ferreira	(Portugal)	12 January 2018	21 May 2018	16	4	3	9	25.00
Santa Clara	(Portugal)	31 May 2018	31 July 2020	78	26	20	32	33.33
Vitória de Guimarães	(Portugal)	13 October 2020	5 April 2021	25	9	6	10	36.00
Moreirense	(Portugal)	5 June 2021	1 December 2021	15	3	7	5	20.00
Marítimo	(Portugal)	8 September 2022	14 December 2022	11	1	3	7	9.09
Olimpija Ljubljana	(Slovenia)	1 June 2023	13 October 2023	21	9	4	8	42.86
Radomiak Radom	(Poland)	8 January 2025	30 October 2025	30	9	10	11	30.00
AVS	(Portugal)	21 December 2025	16 May 2026	21	3	9	9	14.29
Career total				240	75	70	95	31.25
