= Sérgio Vieira (football manager) =

Portuguese football manager (born 1983)

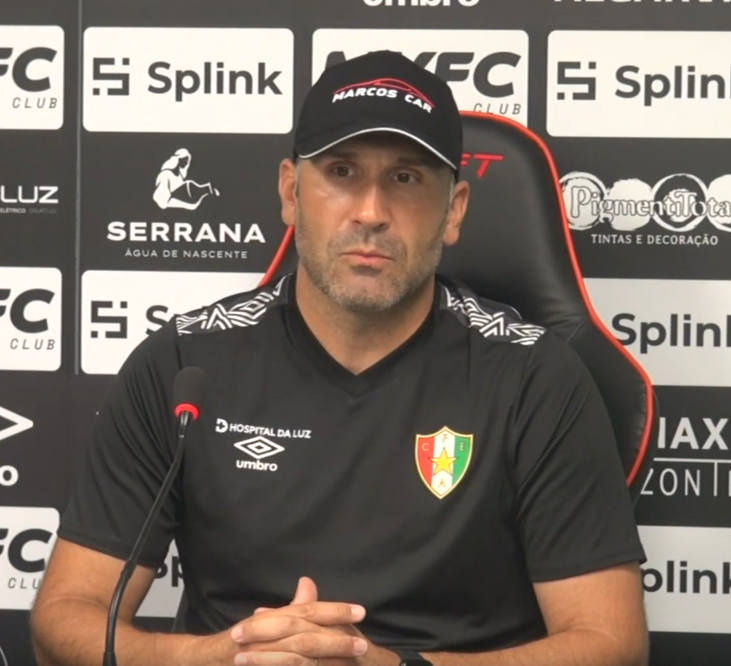
- Vieira with Estrela da Amadora in 2023

Personal information
- Full name: Sérgio Agostinho de Oliveira Vieira
- Date of birth: 15 January 1983 (age 43)
- Place of birth: Póvoa de Lanhoso, Portugal
- Position: Forward

Youth career
- 1996–1998: Amares
- 1998–2000: Braga
- 2000–2002: Amares

Senior career*
Years	Team	Apps	(Gls)
2002–2003	Amares		
2003–2004	ADCR Turiz		
2004	GD Prado		
2005–2006	União Santarém		

Managerial career
- 2005–2006: Sport Lisboa e Cartaxo
- 2006–2007: Condeixa
- 2008–2009: Condeixa (youth)
- 2015: Athletico Paranaense (U23)
- 2015: Guaratinguetá
- 2015: Athletico Paranaense (interim)
- 2016: Ferroviária
- 2016: América Mineiro
- 2017: São Bernardo
- 2017–2018: Moreirense
- 2018–2019: Famalicão
- 2019–2021: Farense
- 2022–2024: Estrela da Amadora
- 2024: Portimonense
- 2025: Académico de Viseu
- * Club domestic league appearances and goals

Sérgio Agostinho de Oliveira Vieira (born 15 January 1983) is a Portuguese football manager.

After a brief amateur playing career as a forward, he began coaching in 2005. He led Athletico Paranaense and América Mineiro in the Campeonato Brasileiro Série A, and Moreirense and Estrela da Amadora in the Primeira Liga.

== Career ==
=== Early career ===
Born in Póvoa de Lanhoso, Braga, Vieira was a forward during his playing days. An S.C. Braga youth graduate, he retired at the age of 21 while playing for Amares, and started studying.

Vieira's first managerial experiences were at Sport Lisboa e Cartaxo and Clube Condeixa, in the regional leagues. After being a tactical coach at Naval 1º de Maio, Académica de Coimbra, Braga (two stints) and Sporting CP, he moved to Brazil.

=== Brazil ===
Vieira was appointed manager of Atlético Paranaense's under-23 squad on 3 July 2015; he was signed by the club in January. Late in the month, however, he was named at the helm of Guaratinguetá, as both clubs sealed a partnership.

Vieira took charge of Guará with the side seriously threatened with relegation in Série C, but managed to avoid the drop after achieving four wins and one draw in nine matches. On 28 September he returned to Furacão, being appointed interim manager after the dismissal of Milton Mendes; he remained in charge for two matches, achieving one win and one loss.

On 11 November 2015, Vieira was appointed Ferroviária manager, after another partnership with Atlético was established. During his spell at the club he impressed, after drawing with Corinthians and defeating Palmeiras; on 4 April, however, after the club's qualification chances were null and relegation became a serious threat, he was sacked.

On 4 June 2016 Vieira was named América Mineiro manager in Série A, replacing fired Givanildo Oliveira. He was dismissed just 43 days later, having taken eight points of a possible 15.

Vieira returned to São Paulo state to manage São Bernardo in the 2017 Campeonato Paulista. After the team were relegated with eight losses from 12 games, a clause was activated to dismiss him at the end of March.

=== Return to Portugal ===
On 31 October 2017, Vieira was appointed at Moreirense for the rest of the Primeira Liga season with the option of two more. Four days later on his domestic debut, the team drew 1–1 at home to Portimonense. He left by mutual consent on 13 February with the club from Moreira de Cónegos still second from bottom.

Vieira was appointed manager of LigaPro club Famalicão on 30 June 2018, replacing Dito at a team under new foreign ownership. He resigned the following 18 March after a run of three games without a win, despite the side from Vila Nova de Famalicão still being in the promotion places.

On 22 May 2019, Vieira was appointed at Farense for the following second-tier campaign. In his first season on the Algarve – curtailed by the COVID-19 pandemic – he guided the team to promotion to the top flight for the first time in 18 years, and was rewarded with a new three-year deal. On 31 January 2021, with Farense last in the league, he left by mutual consent.

Vieira returned to work on 30 June 2022, on a two-year deal at second-tier club Estrela da Amadora. He won promotion in his first season on penalties in the playoffs against Marítimo and then extended his contract to 2026.

On 7 January 2025, Vieira signed with Académico de Viseu in the second tier until the end of the season. He left Académico on 6 October 2025.

== Managerial statistics ==
As of 1 July 2024

Team	Nat	From	To	Record							
Team	Nat	From	To	G	W	D	L	GF	GA	GD	Win %
Guaratinguetá	(Brazil)	31 July 2015	28 September 2015	9	4	1	4	16	14	+2	44.44
Atlético Paranaense (interim)	(Brazil)	28 September 2015	4 October 2015	2	0	1	1	0	1	−1	0.00
Ferroviária	(Brazil)	11 November 2015	4 April 2016	15	6	1	8	20	21	−1	40.00
América Mineiro	(Brazil)	4 June 2016	17 July 2016	10	2	0	8	5	19	−14	20.00
São Bernardo	(Brazil)	13 October 2016	31 March 2017	12	3	1	8	10	17	−7	25.00
Moreirense	(Portugal)	31 October 2017	13 February 2018	17	5	6	6	25	25	+0	29.41
Famalicão	(Portugal)	1 July 2018	18 March 2019	28	14	7	7	35	26	+9	50.00
Farense	(Portugal)	22 May 2019	31 January 2021	44	20	7	17	59	52	+7	45.45
Estrela da Amadora	(Portugal)	1 July 2022	30 June 2024	77	25	29	23	99	102	−3	32.47
Total				214	79	53	82	269	277	−8	36.92

== Honours ==
=== Manager ===
Individual

- Liga Portugal 2 Manager of the Month: December 2022/January 2023, February 2023, April 2023
