= Filipe Coelho (football manager, born 1985) =

Portuguese football manager (born 1985)

Personal information
- Full name: Filipe Emanuel Curto Coelho
- Date of birth: 26 January 1985 (age 41)
- Place of birth: Portugal

Team information
- Current team: Casa Pia (manager)

Managerial career
- Years: Team
- 2006–2007: Povoense (youth)
- 2007–2023: Benfica (youth)
- 2023–2024: Estoril U23
- 2024–2025: Chelsea U21
- 2025–2026: Strasbourg (assistant)
- 2026–: Casa Pia

Filipe Emanuel Curto Coelho (born 26 January 1985) is a Portuguese football manager, currently in charge of Casa Pia.

== Career ==
Coelho began his career with Povoense in 2006, before moving to the structure of Benfica in the following year. He then coached several youth sides at the club before departing on 13 June 2023.

On 11 July 2023, Coelho was named manager of Estoril's under-23 team. He led the side to the Liga Revelação title, and was announced as under-21 coach of Chelsea on 11 July 2024.

On 29 July 2025, Coelho left Chelsea to fellow BlueCo-owned club Strasbourg, as an assistant manager. On 5 July 2026, he returned to Portugal after being appointed manager of Primeira Liga side Casa Pia.
