= 2023–24 Boavista F.C. season =

Boavista F.C.
2023–24 season
- Chairman: Vítor Murta
- Manager: Petit (until 12 December); Jorge Couto (15–28 December); Ricardo Paiva (from 29 December)
- Stadium: Estádio do Bessa
- Primeira Liga: 9th
- Taça de Portugal: Fourth round
- Taça da Liga: First round
- Average home league attendance: 10,627
Home colours
- All statistics correct as of 19 August 2023.

The 2023–24 season is Boavista F.C.'s 121st season in existence and 10th consecutive in the Primeira Liga, the top division of association football in Portugal. They are also competing in the Taça de Portugal and the Taça da Liga.

== Players ==
=== First-team squad ===
As of 10 August 2023

Note: Flags indicate national team as defined under FIFA eligibility rules; some limited exceptions apply. Players may hold more than one non-FIFA nationality.

No.	Pos.	Nation	Player
1	GK	BRA	César
5	DF	NGR	Chidozie Awaziem
6	MF	GUI	Ibrahima Camará
7	FW	POR	Salvador Agra
8	FW	POR	Bruno Lourenço
9	FW	SVK	Róbert Boženík
10	MF	POR	Miguel Reisinho
11	FW	POR	Luís Santos
12	GK	BRA	Luís Pires
13	MF	JPN	Masaki Watai (on loan from Tokushima Vortis)
16	MF	POR	Joel Silva
18	MF	MNE	Ilija Vukotić
20	DF	POR	Filipe Ferreira
21	FW	POR	Tiago Morais
23	DF	FRA	Vincent Sasso
24	MF	COL	Sebastián Pérez (captain)

No.	Pos.	Nation	Player
26	DF	URU	Rodrigo Abascal
27	FW	VEN	Jeriel De Santis
30	FW	IRL	Cristiano Fitzgerald
33	DF	POR	Pedro Gomes
35	DF	POR	Gonçalo Almeida
42	MF	CGO	Gaius Makouta
55	DF	GBS	Augusto Dabó
59	FW	POR	Martim Tavares
70	DF	NGR	Bruno Onyemaechi
76	GK	POR	Tomé Sousa
79	DF	POR	Pedro Malheiro
80	MF	POR	Berna
88	MF	POR	Marco Ribeiro
90	FW	POR	Tiago Machado
99	GK	POR	João Gonçalves

=== Out on loan ===
Note: Flags indicate national team as defined under FIFA eligibility rules; some limited exceptions apply. Players may hold more than one non-FIFA nationality.

No.	Pos.	Nation	Player
17	FW	POR	Manuel Namora (at Leixões until 30 June 2024)

== Transfers ==
=== In ===
Pos.	Player	Transferred from	Fee	Date	Source

=== Out ===
Pos.	Player	Transferred to	Fee	Date	Source

== Pre-season and friendlies ==
Win Draw Loss Fixtures

12 July 2023 Friendly	Boavista (Portugal)	3–1	(Portugal) Leixões	Porto
10:30 UTC+1				Stadium: Campo de Treinos do Estádio do Bessa XXI

15 July 2023 Friendly	Braga (Portugal)	2–0	(Portugal) Boavista	Braga
10:00 UTC+1				Stadium: Cidade Desportiva SC Braga

18 July 2023 Friendly	Arouca (Portugal)	3–0	(Portugal) Boavista	Luso
19:00 UTC+1	Mújica 34'; Cristo 61'; Galović 79'			Stadium: Centro de Estágios de Luso

19 July 2023 Friendly	Boavista (Portugal)	4–3	(Saudi Arabia) Al-Hazem	Freamunde
10:30 UTC+1				Stadium: Complexo Desportivo do SC Freamunde

26 July 2023 Friendly	Boavista (Portugal)	3–0	(Portugal) Boavista U19
10:30 UTC+1

29 July 2023 Friendly	Penafiel (Portugal)	1–3	(Portugal) Boavista

4 August 2023 Friendly	Paços de Ferreira (Portugal)	3–2	(Portugal) Boavista	Paços de Ferreira
10:00 UTC+1				Stadium: Estádio Capital do Móvel

5 August 2023 Friendly	Boavista (Portugal)	0–0	(Portugal) Estoril	Porto
10:30 UTC+1

== Competitions ==
=== Overall record ===
Competition	First match	Last match	Starting round	Final position	Record							
Competition	First match	Last match	Starting round	Final position	Pld	W	D	L	GF	GA	GD	Win %
Primeira Liga	14 August 2023	May 2024	Matchday 1		21	6	6	9	29	38	−9	28.57
Taça de Portugal	22 October 2023	26 November 2023	Third round	Fourth round	2	1	1	0	5	3	+2	50.00
Taça da Liga	24 July 2023		First round	First round	1	0	1	0	0	0	+0	0.00
Total					24	7	8	9	34	41	−7	29.17

Last updated: 10 February 2024
Source: Soccerway

=== Primeira Liga ===
==== League table ====
Pos	Team	Pld	W	D	L	GF	GA	GD	Pts	Qualification or relegation
13	Estoril	34	9	6	19	49	58	−9	33 (Note: Head-to-head away goals scored: Estoril 1, Estrela da Amadora 0.)	
14	Estrela da Amadora	34	7	12	15	33	53	−20	33	
15	Boavista	34	7	11	16	39	62	−23	32 (Note: Head-to-head points: Boavista 4, Portimonense 1.)	
16	Portimonense (R)	34	8	8	18	39	72	−33	32	Qualification for the relegation play-offs
17	Vizela (R)	34	5	11	18	36	66	−30	26	Relegation to Liga Portugal 2

Source: Liga Portugal
Rules for classification: 1) Points; 2) Head-to-head points; 3) Head-to-head goal difference; 4) Head-to-head away goals scored; 5) Goal difference; 6) Matches won; 7) Goals scored; 8) Play-off.
(R) Relegated

==== Results summary ====
Overall								Home						Away					
Pld	W	D	L	GF	GA	GD	Pts	W	D	L	GF	GA	GD	W	D	L	GF	GA	GD
21	6	6	9	29	38	−9	24	3	4	4	16	22	−6	3	2	5	13	16	−3

Last updated: 10 February 2024.
Source: Liga Portugal

==== Results by round ====
Round	1	2	3	4	5	6	7	8	9	10	11	12	13	14	15	16	17	18	19	20	21	22	23
Ground	H	A	H	A	H	A	H	A	H	A	H	H	A	H	A	H	A	A	H	A	H	A	H
Result	W	W	D	W	W	L	D	D	L	L	L	L	L	D	L	D	W	L	L	D	W		
Position	5	1	4	1	1	4	4	6	6	7	9	9	10	11	13	12	9	9	12	12	9		

Updated to match(es) played on 10 February 2024. Source: Liga Portugal
A = Away; H = Home; W = Win; D = Draw; L = Loss

==== Matches ====
The league fixtures were unveiled on 5 July 2023.

14 August 2023 1	Boavista	3–2	Benfica	Porto
20:45 UTC+1	Reisinho (yellow card) 1'; Makouta (yellow card) 11'; Pérez (yellow card) 14'; Boženík 55', 90+13', (yellow card) 90+14'; Onyemaechi (yellow card) 67'; Lourenço 90' (pen.), (red card) 90+9'; Berna (yellow card) 90+8'	Report	Di María 22', (yellow card) 54'; Musa (red card) 50'; R. Silva (yellow card) 65', (goal) 75'; Bah (yellow card) 82'; A. Silva (yellow card) 88'	Stadium: Estádio do Bessa; Attendance: 21,320; Referee: António Nobre

19 August 2023 2	Portimonense	1–4	Boavista	Portimão
20:30 UTC+1	Guga (yellow card) 20'; Seck (yellow card) 25'; Rildo (yellow card) 34'; Ronie Carrillo 90+1'	Report	Relvas 6' (o.g.); Boženík 9'; Morais 22'; Gonçalves (yellow card) 65'; De Santis (yellow card) 89'; Vukotić 90+5'	Stadium: Estádio Municipal de Portimão; Attendance: 2,034; Referee: João Pinheiro

27 August 2023 3	Boavista	1–1	Casa Pia	Porto
15:30 WET	Pedro Malheiro (yellow card) 35' (goal) 48'	Report	Clayton 33'	Stadium: Estádio do Bessa; Attendance: 4,945; Referee: (Portugal) Bruno Pires Costa

3 September 2023 4	Estoril	1–2	Boavista	Estoril
15:30 WET	Alejandro Marqués 34' (yellow card) 70'; Pedro Álvaro (yellow card) 84'; Rodrigo Gomes (yellow card) 85'	Report	Pedro Malheiro 4'; Tiago Morais 41'; Makouta (yellow card) 52'	Stadium: Estádio António Coimbra da Mota; Attendance: 3,056; Referee: (Portugal) Claúdio Pereira

18 September 2023 5	Boavista	4–1	Chaves	Porto
20:15 WET	Tiago Morais 1'; Salvador Agra 5'; Boženík 11' 23'; Pérez (yellow card) 90+4'	Report	Ygor Nogueira (yellow card) 33'; Paulo Victor (yellow card) 45+3' (goal) 71'; Guima (yellow card) 89'	Stadium: Estádio do Bessa; Attendance: 7,022; Referee: (Portugal) Nuno Almeida

24 September 2023 6	Braga	4–1	Boavista	Braga
20:30 WET	Ricardo Horta 19' (yellow card) 49' (goal) 58'; Banza 37' (yellow card) 90+5'; Al-Musrati 54' (pen.)	Report	Tiago Morais 26'; Pérez (yellow card) 30' (yellow-red card) 31'; Makouta (yellow card) 45+2'	Stadium: Estádio Municipal de Braga; Attendance: 16,394; Referee: (Portugal) Artur Soares Dias

30 September 2023 7	Boavista	2–2	Famalicão	Porto
18:00 WET	Tiago Morais (yellow card) 25' (yellow-red card) 79'; Makouta (yellow card) 43'; Miguel Reisinho 44'; Abascal (yellow card) 53'; Salvador Agra 68'; Vukotić (yellow card) 74'	Report	Cádiz 12' (pen.) (red card) 69'; Lacoux (yellow card) 37'; Martín Aguirregabiria (yellow card) 45+2'; Afonso Rodrigues (yellow card) 65'; Francisco Moura (yellow card) 67'; Chiquinho (red card) 71'; de Haas 90+2'	Stadium: Estádio do Bessa; Attendance: 7,809; Referee: (Portugal) Gustavo Correia

6 October 2023 8	Moreirense	1–1	Boavista	Moreira de Cónegos
20:15 WET	André Luis 35'	Report	Marcelo 21' (o.g.); Bruno Lourenço (yellow card) 47'; Awaziem (yellow card) 65'; Miguel Reisinho (yellow card) 80'	Stadium: Parque de Jogos Comendador Joaquim de Almeida Freitas; Attendance: 2,388; Referee: (Portugal) David Silva

30 October 2023 9	Boavista	0–2	Sporting CP	Porto
20:15 WET	Awaziem (yellow card) 45+2'; Tiago Morais (yellow card) 47'; Filipe Ferreira (yellow card) 59'	Report	Geny Catamo 37'; Edwards (yellow card) 74'; Pote 85'; Hjulmand (yellow card) 90+7'	Stadium: Estádio do Bessa; Attendance: 12,608; Referee: (Portugal) Nuno Almeida

5 November 2023 10	Rio Ave	2–0	Boavista	Vila do Conde
18:00 WET	Fábio Ronaldo (yellow card) 23' (goal) 37'; André Pereira (yellow card) 40'; Boateng (yellow card) 45+3' (goal) 47'	Report	Awaziem (yellow card) 42'; De Santis (yellow card) 82'	Stadium: Estádio dos Arcos; Attendance: 2,866; Referee: (Portugal) Claúdio Pereira

12 November 2023 11	Boavista	1–3	Farense	Porto
15:30 WET	Miguel Reisinho (yellow card) 50'; Awaziem (yellow card) 83'; Boženík 86'; Martim Tavares (yellow card) 90'	Report	Elves Baldé 29'; Fabrício Isidoro (yellow card) 80' (goal) 90+2'; Rafael Barbosa 90+6'	Stadium: Estádio do Bessa; Attendance: 6,520; Referee: (Portugal) André Narciso

3 December 2023 12	Boavista	0–4	Arouca	Porto
20:30 WET	Onyemaechi (yellow card) 1'; Pérez (yellow card) 45+1'; Tiago Morais (yellow card) 67' (yellow-red card) 90+4'; Berna (yellow card) 81'; Filipe Ferreira (yellow card) 82'	Report	Cristo González 2' 23'; Rafa Mújica 39'; Milovanov (yellow card) 42' (yellow-red card) 49'; Sylla (yellow card) 55'; Trezza (yellow card) 70'; Jason 72'	Stadium: Estádio do Bessa; Attendance: 3,788; Referee: (Portugal) Tiago Martins (referee)

10 December 2023 13	Estrela	3–1	Boavista	Amadora
15:30 WET	André Luiz (yellow card) 31'; Léo Cordeiro (yellow card) 36'; Léo Jabá 52'; Kialonda Gaspar (yellow card) 63'; Erivaldo Almeida (yellow card) 72'; Abascal 78' (o.g.); Kikas 84'	Report	Filipe Ferreira (yellow card) 25'; Martim Tavares 74'; Pérez (yellow card) 78'	Stadium: Estádio José Gomes; Attendance: 3,732; Referee: (Portugal) Iancu Vasilica

16 December 2023 14	Boavista	1–1	Vitória de Guimarães	Porto
20:30 WET	Makouta (yellow card) 13'; Salvador Agra (yellow card) 15'; Pérez (yellow card) 49'; Abascal (yellow card) 57'; Pedro Malheiro (yellow card) 76'; Boženík (yellow card) 80'; Tiago Morais 90+3' (pen.)	Report	Tomás Ribeiro (yellow card) 16'; Nélson da Luz (yellow card) 28'; Jota Silva 30'	Stadium: Estádio do Bessa; Attendance: 8,970; Referee: (Portugal) Fábio Veríssimo

30 December 2023 15	Gil Vicente	1–0	Boavista	Barcelos
15:30 WET	Murilo Costa 64' (pen.)	Report	Pedro Malheiro (yellow card) 63'	Stadium: Estádio Cidade de Barcelos; Attendance: 4,986; Referee: (Portugal) Luís Godinho

5 January 2024 16	Boavista	1–1	Porto	Porto
20:45 WET	Bruno Lourenço 28'; Pedro Malheiro (yellow card) 42'; Luís Santos (yellow card) 62'; Vukotić (yellow card) 88'; Camará (red card) 88'; Abascal (yellow card) 90+2'; João Gonçalves (yellow card) 90+2'	Report	Toni Martínez 23'; Pepê (yellow card) 89'	Stadium: Estádio do Bessa; Attendance: 13,945; Referee: (Portugal) Manuel Oliveira

14 January 2024 17	Vizela	1–4	Boavista	Vizela
18:00 WET	Matheus Pereira (yellow card) 45+1'; Essende (yellow card) 79' (goal) 88'	Report	Filipe Ferreira (yellow card) 18'; Sasso 24'; Tiago Morais 40'; Abascal 52'; Boženík 65' (yellow card) 90+3'	Stadium: Estádio do Futebol Clube de Vizela; Attendance: 1,998; Referee: (Portugal) Claúdio Pereira

19 January 2024 18	Benfica	2–0	Boavista	Lisbon
20:15 WET	Otamendi (yellow card) 49'; Rafa Silva (yellow card) 55'; Florentino Luís (yellow card) 56'; Di María 61'; Marcos Leonardo 90+4'	Report	Abascal (yellow card) 57'; Pérez (yellow card) 80'; Vukotić (yellow card) 86'	Stadium: Estádio da Luz; Attendance: 54,345; Referee: (Portugal) Gustavo Correia

28 January 2024 19	Boavista	1–4	Portimonense	Porto
15:30 WET	Sasso (yellow card) 34'; Makouta 67'; Abascal (yellow card) 75'	Report	Hélio Varela 18' (yellow card) 72'; Jasper 25'; Carlinhos 35'; Dener (yellow card) 83'; Luan Campos 90+5'	Stadium: Estádio do Bessa; Attendance: 6,917; Referee: (Portugal) Bruno Pires Costa

5 February 2024 20	Casa Pia	0–0	Boavista	Rio Maior
20:15 WET	Nuno Moreira (yellow card) 45+1'; Ângelo Neto (yellow card) 60'; Felippe Cardoso (yellow card) 75'	Report	Sasso (yellow card) 59'	Stadium: Estádio Municipal de Rio Maior; Attendance: 1,261; Referee: (Portugal) Iancu Vasilica

10 February 2024 21	Boavista	2–1	Estoril	Porto
20:30 WET	Sasso 15'; Boženík 29'; Makouta (yellow card) 48'; Pérez (yellow card) 61'; Bruno Lourenço (yellow card) 85'; Camará (yellow card) 87'; João Gonçalves (yellow card) 90'	Report	Ndiaye (yellow card) 17'; Alejandro Marqués 54'; Vinicius Zanocelo (yellow card) 70'; João Carlos (yellow card) 86'; Mateus Fernandes (yellow card) 90+3'	Stadium: Estádio do Bessa; Attendance: 7,112; Referee: (Portugal) João Pinheiro

17 February 2024 22	Chaves	–	Boavista	Chaves
15:30 WET				Stadium: Estádio Municipal Eng. Manuel Branco Teixeira

=== Taça de Portugal ===
22 October 2023 Third round	Oliveirense	1–3	Boavista	Oliveira de Azeméis
20:00 WET	Vasco Gadelho (yellow card) 10'; João Paulo 55' (yellow card) 90+2'	Report	Boženík 16'; Pérez 33'; Onyemaechi (yellow card) 42'; Miguel Reisinho 72'; Masaki Watai (yellow card) 75'	Stadium: Estádio Carlos Osório; Referee: (Portugal) João Pinheiro

26 November 2023 Fourth round	Arouca	2–2 (4–3 p)	Boavista	Arouca
20:00 WET	Kouassi (yellow card) 38'; Cristo González 39'; Milovanov (yellow card) 58'; Trezza (yellow card) 95'; Pedro Santos 105+5' (pen.) (yellow card) 110'	Report	Onyemaechi (yellow card) 18'; Tiago Morais (yellow card) 37'; Awaziem (yellow card) 46'; Bruno Lourenço (yellow card) 49' (goal) 106'; Boženík 62' (yellow card) 78'; Berna (yellow card) 105+2'; Vukotić (yellow card) 120'	Stadium: Estádio Municipal de Arouca; Referee: (Portugal) Fábio Melo

=== Taça da Liga ===
24 July 2023 First round	Boavista	0–0 (4–5 p)	União de Leiria	Porto
20:15 UTC+1				Stadium: Estádio do Bessa
