= 2024–25 Boavista F.C. season =

Boavista
2024–25 season
- Head coach: Lito Vidigal (until 6 April); Jorge Couto (caretaker, 7–12 April); Stuart Baxter (from 13 April)
- Stadium: Estádio do Bessa
- Primeira Liga: 18th
- Taça de Portugal: Third round
- Average home league attendance: 7,212
Home colours

The 2024–25 season was the 103rd season in the history of Boavista, and it was also the 18th consecutive season in Primeira Liga. In addition to the domestic league, the team participated in the Taça de Portugal.

== Transfers ==
=== Out ===
Pos.	Player	Transferred to	Fee	Date	Source
MF	(Portugal) Bruno Lourenço	(Turkey) Amed	Contract termination	16 July 2024	
FW	(Portugal) Luís Santos	(Slovakia) Košice	Undisclosed	19 July 2024	
DF	(Portugal) Pedro Malheiro	(Turkey) Trabzonspor	€2,000,000	23 July 2024	
DF	(Nigeria) Chidozie Awaziem	(United States) Cincinnati	€500,000	25 July 2024	

== Friendlies ==
=== Pre-season ===
13 July 2024 Friendly	Boavista (Portugal)	3–0	(Portugal) Tirsense
13:00 UTC+1

18 July 2024 Friendly	Boavista (Portugal)	3–2	(Portugal) Leixões
16:30 UTC+1

24 July 2024 Friendly	Boavista (Portugal)	2–4	(Portugal) Santa Clara
16:30 UTC+1

27 July 2024 Friendly	Lusitânia (Portugal)	1–1	(Portugal) Boavista
Note: Match abandoned during first half.

== Competitions ==
=== Overall record ===
Competition	First match	Last match	Starting round	Final position	Record							
Competition	First match	Last match	Starting round	Final position	Pld	W	D	L	GF	GA	GD	Win %
Primeira Liga	9–12 August 2024	May 2025	Matchday 1		30	5	6	19	20	47	−27	16.67
Taça de Portugal	20 October 2024	20 October 2024	Third round	Third round	1	0	0	1	0	1	−1	0.00
Total					31	5	6	20	20	48	−28	16.13

Last updated: 18 April 2025
Source: Soccerway

=== Primeira Liga ===
==== League table ====
Pos	Team	Pld	W	D	L	GF	GA	GD	Pts	Qualification or relegation
14	Nacional	34	9	7	18	32	50	−18	34	
15	Estrela da Amadora	34	7	8	19	24	50	−26	29	
16	AVS (O)	34	5	12	17	25	60	−35	27 (Note: Head to head points: AVS 4, Farense 1.)	Qualification for the relegation play-offs
17	Farense (R)	34	6	9	19	25	46	−21	27	Relegation to Liga Portugal 2
18	Boavista (D, R)	34	6	6	22	24	59	−35	24	Administrative relegation to Porto Football Association

Source: Liga Portugal
Rules for classification: 1) Points; 2) Head-to-head points; 3) Head-to-head goal difference; 4) Goal difference; 5) Matches won; 6) Goals scored; 7) Play-off.
(D) Disqualified; (O) Play-off winners; (R) Relegated

==== Results summary ====
Overall								Home						Away					
Pld	W	D	L	GF	GA	GD	Pts	W	D	L	GF	GA	GD	W	D	L	GF	GA	GD
15	2	6	7	10	19	−9	12	0	3	4	1	9	−8	2	3	3	9	10	−1

==== Results by round ====
Round	1	2	3	4	5	6	7	8	9	10	11	12	13	14	15	16
Ground	A	H	A	H	A	H	A	A	H	A	H	A	H	A	H	
Result	W	L	L	D	D	L	L	D	L	W	L	D	D	L	D	
Position	6	9	11	11	13	15	16	14	15	11	14	12	14	16	16	

A = Away; H = Home; W = Win; D = Draw; L = Loss

==== Matches ====
The match schedule was released on 7 July 2024.

10 August 2024 1	Casa Pia	0–1	Boavista	Rio Maior
18:00 UTC+1	Zolotić (yellow card) 5'; Segovia (yellow card) 28'	Report	Bozenik (yellow card) 65'; Reisinho 77'	Stadium: Estádio Municipal de Rio Maior; Attendance: 1.142; Referee: Pedro Ramalho

18 August 2024 2	Boavista	0–1	Braga	Porto
20:00 UTC+1	Silva (yellow card) 58'; Seba Pérez (yellow card) 73'; Cristiano Bacci (yellow card) 81'; Bozenik (yellow card) 90+4'	Report	Fernández 40'; C. Carvalhal (yellow card) 72'; Gómez (yellow card) 83'	Stadium: Estádio do Bessa Século XXI; Attendance: 7.119; Referee: António Nobre

24 August 2024 3	Famalicão	1–0	Boavista	Famalicão
20:30 UTC+1	Gustavo Sá 6'; Mihaj (yellow card) 58'	Report	Gomes (yellow card) 16'; Ferreira (yellow card) 32'; Vukotić (yellow card) 41'	Stadium: Estádio Municipal de Famalicão; Attendance: 4.319; Referee: David Silva

31 August 2024 4	Boavista	0–0	Estoril Praia	Porto
18:00 UTC+1	Ricardo Paiva (yellow card) 20'; Abascal (yellow card) 51'; Reisinho (yellow card) 90+3'; Cristiano Bacci (yellow card) 90+5'	Report	Carvalho (yellow card) 53'; Álvaro (yellow card) 77'; Xeka (yellow card) 82'; Joel Robles (yellow card) 90'; Mangala (yellow card) 90+2'	Stadium: Estádio do Bessa Século XXI; Attendance: 3.956; Referee: Gustavo Correia

16 September 2024 5	Estrela Amadora	2–2	Boavista	Amadora
20:15 UTC+1	Nani 34', (yellow card) 45+2'; Keliano (yellow card) 36'; Ruiz (yellow card) 45+2'; Kikas 68'	Report	Onyemaechi 23', (yellow card) 85'; Pedro Gomes (yellow card) 34'; Vukotić 45+5'; Ibrahima (yellow card) 48'; Sousa (yellow card) 56'	Stadium: Estádio José Gomes; Attendance: 3.476; Referee: Tiago Martins

23 September 2024 6	Boavista	0–3	Benfica	Porto
20:15 UTC+1	Ibrahima (yellow card) 70'; Gomes (yellow card) 78'	Report	Pavlidis 11'; Kökçü 31'; Cabral 90+1'	Stadium: Estádio do Bessa Século XXI; Attendance: 16,151; Referee: João Pinheiro

29 September 2024 7	Santa Clara	1–0	Boavista	Ponta Delgada
20:30 UTC+1	P. Ferreira (yellow card) 9'; Pereira (yellow card) 30'; Lopes 36'; Calila (yellow card) 39'; Firmino (yellow card) 90+3'	Report	Miguel (yellow card) 20'; Gomes (yellow card) 88'; F. Ferreira (yellow card) 90+1'	Stadium: Estádio de São Miguel; Attendance: 1,320; Referee: Bruno Vieira

6 October 2024 8	Vitória Guimarães	2–2	Boavista	Guimarães
15:30 UTC+1	Villanueva (yellow card) 6'; G. Silva (yellow card) 31', (goal) 34', 49'; Händel (yellow card) 69'; Varela (yellow card) 90+4'; Oliveira (yellow card) 90+13'	Report	Onyemaechi (yellow card) 11'; César (yellow card) 26'; Joel Silva (yellow card) 45+7'; Reisinho (yellow card) 71', (goal) 90+5' (pen.), 90+15' (pen.); Abascal (yellow card) 90+1'	Stadium: Estádio D. Afonso Henriques; Attendance: 15,961; Referee: Luís Godinho

26 October 2024 9	Boavista	0–2	Moreirense	Porto
18:00 UTC+1	Reisinho (yellow card) 32'	Report	Schettine 20'; Ismael (yellow card) 26'; Kewin (yellow card) 53'; Pinto (yellow card) 66'; Gabrielzinho 90+2'	Stadium: Estádio do Bessa Século XXI; Attendance: 3,697; Referee: André Narciso

2 November 2024 10	Gil Vicente	1–2	Boavista	Barcelos
20:30 UTC+1	García (yellow card) 47'; Cauê 72', (yellow card) 90'; Correia (yellow card) 83'	Report	Pedro Gomes (yellow card) 39'; Vukotić 48'; Joel Silva 51'; Agra (yellow card) 73'; Miguel Cid (yellow card) 90+5'	Stadium: Estádio Cidade de Barcelos; Attendance: 4,221; Referee: Sérgio Guelho

9 November 2024 11	Boavista	0–2	Rio Ave	Porto
20:30 UTC+1	Agra (yellow card) 2'; Cristiano Bacci (yellow card) 33'; Gil Andrade (red card) 58'; Abascal (yellow card) 60'; Pérez (yellow card) 77' (yellow-red card) 78'; Rafael Bracali (red card) 79'; Ibrahima (yellow card) 90+4'	Report	Clayton 5', (yellow card) 10'; Neto (yellow card) 7'; Aguilera 76'; Jhonatan (yellow card) 78'; Amine (red card) 78'; Mário Nunes (red card) 79'	Stadium: Estádio do Bessa Século XXI; Attendance: 4,495; Referee: João Gonçalves

30 November 2024 12	Nacional	0–0	Boavista	Funchal
18:00 UTC+1	Dias (yellow card) 11'; Margarido (yellow card) 67'	Report	Pedro Gomes (yellow card) 20'; Joel Silva (yellow card) 47'; Cristiano Bacci (yellow card) 82'	Stadium: Estádio da Madeira; Attendance: 1,516; Referee: Iancu Vasilica

8 December 2024 13	Boavista	1–1	Farense	Porto
15:30 UTC+1	Vukotić (yellow card) 86' (yellow-red card) 90+4'; Reisinho 90+5' (pen.); Agra (yellow card) 90+7'; Ricardo Paiva (red card) 90+7'	Report	Falcão (yellow card) 47'; Matias 52'; Áfrico (yellow card) 89' (yellow-red card) 90+4'; Victor (yellow card) 90+7'	Stadium: Estádio do Bessa Século XXI; Attendance: 3,845; Referee: David Silva

14 December 2024 14	Sporting CP	3–2	Boavista	Lisbon
20:30 UTC+1	Gyökeres 23'; Reis (yellow card) 39'; Trincão 49', 66'; Araújo (yellow card) 80'; Hjulmand (yellow card) 86'	Report	Bozenik 43'; Onyemaechi 58', (yellow card) 75'; Abascal (yellow card) 59'; Pérez (yellow card) 90+5'	Stadium: Estádio José Alvalade; Attendance: 45,090; Referee: Fábio Veríssimo

21 December 2024 15	Boavista	0–0	AVS	Porto
20:45 UTC+1	Vukotić (yellow card) 73'	Report	Mendonça (yellow card) 42'; Kiki (yellow card) 55'	Stadium: Estádio do Bessa Século XXI; Attendance: 3.321; Referee: Cláudio Pereira

28 December 2024 16	Porto	4–0	Boavista
20:30 UTC+1		Report

4 January 2025 17	Boavista	1–3	Arouca

20 January 2025 18	Boavista	2–3	Casa Pia

26 January 2025 19	Sporting CP	3–0	Boavista

31 January 2025 20	Boavista	0–2	Famalicão

9 February 2025 21	Estoril	2–1	Boavista

14 February 2025 22	Boavista	0–1	Estrela da Amadora

22 February 2025 23	Benfica	3–0	Boavista

2 March 2025 24	Boavista	1–0	Santa Clara

9 March 2025 25	Boavista	1–2	Vitória de Guimarães

16 March 2025 26	Moreirense	1–0	Boavista

1 April 2025 27	Boavista	1–3	Gil Vicente

7 April 2025 28	Rio Ave	0–2	Boavista

12 April 2025 29	Boavista	0–1	Nacional

18 April 2025 30	Farense	0–1	Boavista

27 April 2025 31	Boavista	0–5	Sporting CP

5 May 2025 32	AVS	1–2	Boavista	Vila das Aves
20:15 UTC+1				Stadium: Estádio do CD Aves

11 May 2025 33	Boavista	v	Porto	Porto
20:30 UTC+1

=== Taça de Portugal ===
20 October 2024 Third round	Varzim	1–0	Boavista	Póvoa de Varzim
20:15 WEST (UTC+01:00)	Pacheco (yellow card) 45+1'; Moshood 51'; Rêgo (yellow card) 53'; Zé Oliveira (yellow card) 68'		Pedro Gomes (yellow card) 38'; Ibrahima (yellow card) 65'	Stadium: Estádio do Varzim SC; Referee: Cláudio Pereira
