= 2022–23 Boavista F.C. season =

Boavista F.C.
2022–23 season
- Owner: Gérard López
- President: Vítor Murta
- Head coach: Petit
- Stadium: Estádio do Bessa
- Primeira Liga: 9th
- Taça de Portugal: Third round
- Taça da Liga: Quarter-finals
Home colours	Away colours

The 2022–23 season was the 120th in the history of Boavista F.C. and their ninth consecutive season in the top flight. The club participated in the Primeira Liga, the Taça de Portugal, and the Taça da Liga.

== Players ==
As of 13 January 2023

Note: Flags indicate national team as defined under FIFA eligibility rules; some limited exceptions apply. Players may hold more than one non-FIFA nationality.

No.	Pos.	Nation	Player
1	GK	BRA	Rafael Bracali
2	DF	USA	Reggie Cannon
4	DF	BRA	Robson Reis (on loan from Santos)
6	MF	GUI	Ibrahima Camará
7	FW	CUW	Kenji Gorré
8	MF	POR	Bruno Lourenço
9	FW	SVK	Róbert Boženík (on loan from Feyenoord)
10	MF	POR	Miguel Reisinho
11	FW	GAM	Yusupha Njie
12	GK	BRA	César
13	MF	JPN	Masaki Watai (on loan from Tokushima Vortis)
16	MF	POR	Joel Silva
18	MF	MNE	Ilija Vukotić
19	DF	POR	Ricardo Mangas
20	DF	POR	Filipe Ferreira

No.	Pos.	Nation	Player
21	FW	POR	Salvador Agra
23	DF	FRA	Vincent Sasso
24	MF	COL	Seba Pérez
26	DF	URU	Rodrigo Abascal
42	MF	CGO	Gaius Makouta
55	DF	GBS	Julio Dabo
59	FW	POR	Martim Tavares
62	DF	POR	Pedro Gomes
70	DF	NGR	Sopuruchukwu Onyemaechi (on loan from Feirense)
77	FW	POR	Luis Santos
79	DF	POR	Pedro Malheiro
80	MF	POR	Berna
97	FW	VEN	Adalberto Peñaranda
99	GK	POR	João Gonçalves

=== Out on loan ===
Note: Flags indicate national team as defined under FIFA eligibility rules; some limited exceptions apply. Players may hold more than one non-FIFA nationality.

No.	Pos.	Nation	Player
—	DF	POR	Gonçalo Almeida (on loan at Vila Meã until 30 June 2023)
—	DF	NGR	Chidozie Awaziem (on loan at Hajduk Split until 30 June 2023)
—	FW	VEN	Jeriel De Santis (on loan at Cartagena until 30 June 2023)

No.	Pos.	Nation	Player
—	FW	POR	Tiago Morais (on loan at Leixões until 30 June 2023)
—	FW	POR	Manuel Namora (on loan at Felgueiras 1932 until 30 June 2023)
—	FW	DOM	Diego Llorente (on loan at Leça until 30 June 2023)

== Pre-season and friendlies ==
Win Draw Loss

16 July 2022 Friendly	Boavista (Portugal)	0–2	(Portugal) Arouca	Porto
10:00 WEST (UTC+1)			Antony 45'; Bruno Marques 54'	Stadium: Estádio do Bessa

20 July 2022 Friendly	Boavista (Portugal)	1–0	(Portugal) Nacional	Porto
16:00 WEST (UTC+1)	Njie 42'			Stadium: Campo de Treinos do Bessa; Attendance: 300

23 July 2022 Friendly	Boavista (Portugal)	0–1	(Portugal) Leixões	Porto
10:30 WEST (UTC+1)			Cannon 47' (o.g.)	Stadium: Estádio do Bessa

26 July 2022 Friendly	Boavista (Portugal)	1–1	(Portugal) Marítimo	Lousada
15:30 WEST (UTC+1)	Gorré		Beltrame	Stadium: Complexo Desportivo de Lousada

30 July 2022 Friendly	Boavista (Portugal)	0–3	(Portugal) Varzim	Porto
10:30 WEST (UTC+1)			Onyeka Osemene; Latón; Iván Quivira	Stadium: Estádio do Bessa; Attendance: 0

30 July 2022 Friendly	Trofense (Portugal)	1–2	(Portugal) Boavista	Trofa
19:00 WEST (UTC+1)				Stadium: Estádio do CD Trofense

3 August 2022 Friendly	Boavista (Portugal)	3–3 (6–7 p)	(Bolivia) Bolívar	Porto
20:00 WEST (UTC+1)	Bozeník 11'; Malheiro 19'; Santos 48'		Miranda 54', 56', 90+2'	Stadium: Estádio do Bessa; Referee: Manuel Oliveira

7 December 2022 Friendly	Celta Vigo (Spain)	1–1	(Portugal) Boavista	Vigo, Spain
18:00 CET (UTC+1)	Aspas 36'; Bozeník (yellow card) 68'; De la Torre (yellow card) 76'; Domínguez (yellow card) 68'		Bozeník 41'; Makouta (yellow card) 68'; Njie (yellow card) 70'; Reisinho (yellow card) 71'	Stadium: Estadio Municipal de Atletismo de Balaídos

16 December 2022 Friendly	Boavista (Portugal)	0–2	(France) Bordeaux	Vila Real de Santo António
15:30 WET (UTC±0)			Davitashvili 33'; Maja 63'	Stadium: Complexo Desportivo de VRSA

== Competitions ==
=== Overall record ===
Competition	First match	Last match	Starting round	Final position	Record							
Competition	First match	Last match	Starting round	Final position	Pld	W	D	L	GF	GA	GD	Win %
Primeira Liga	7 August 2022	27 May 2023	Matchday 1	9th	34	12	8	14	43	54	−11	35.29
Taça de Portugal	16 October 2022		Third round	Third round	1	0	0	1	0	1	−1	0.00
Taça da Liga	18 November 2022	20 December 2022	Group stage	Quarter-finals	4	2	1	1	5	4	+1	50.00
Total					39	14	9	16	48	59	−11	35.90

Source: Soccerway

=== Primeira Liga ===
==== League table ====
Pos	Team	Pld	W	D	L	GF	GA	GD	Pts
7	Chaves	34	12	10	12	35	40	−5	46
8	Famalicão	34	13	5	16	39	47	−8	44
9	Boavista	34	12	8	14	43	54	−11	44
10	Casa Pia	34	11	8	15	31	40	−9	41
11	Vizela	34	11	7	16	34	38	−4	40 (Note: Vizela finished ahead of Rio Ave on head-to-head points: Rio Ave 0–1 Vizela, Vizela 3–1 Rio Ave.)

Source: Liga Portugal
Rules for classification: 1) Points; 2) Head-to-head points; 3) Head-to-head goal difference; 4) Goal difference; 5) Matches won; 6) Goals scored; 7) Play-off.

==== Results summary ====
Overall								Home						Away					
Pld	W	D	L	GF	GA	GD	Pts	W	D	L	GF	GA	GD	W	D	L	GF	GA	GD
34	12	8	14	43	54	−11	44	8	6	3	23	21	+2	4	2	11	20	33	−13

Last updated: 27 May 2023.
Source: Liga Portugal

==== Results by round ====
Round	1	2	3	4	5	6	7	8	9	10	11	12	13	14	15	16	17	18	19	20	21	22	23	24	25	26	27	28	29	30	31	32	33	34
Ground	A	H	A	H	H	A	H	A	H	A	H	A	H	A	H	A	H	H	A	H	A	A	H	A	H	A	H	A	H	A	H	A	H	A
Result	W	W	L	L	W	W	W	L	D	L	D	L	L	L	W	L	D	W	D	D	L	W	D	L	L	L	W	D	W	L	W	L	D	W
Position	7	4	4	9	5	4	4	5	6	7	7	12	12	12	9	10	9	9	9	9	11	8	8	10	13	13	12	12	11	12	10	10	10	9

Updated to match(es) played on 27 May 2023. Source: Liga Portugal
A = Away; H = Home; W = Win; D = Draw; L = Loss

==== Matches ====
The league fixtures were announced on 5 July 2022.

7 August 2022 1	Portimonense	0–1	Boavista	Portimão
20:30 WEST (UTC+01:00)		Report	Njie 9'	Stadium: Estádio Municipal de Portimão; Attendance: 2,590; Referee: Claúdio Pereira

14 August 2022 2	Boavista	2–1	Santa Clara	Porto
15:30 WEST (UTC+01:00)	Njie 62'; Tavares 66'	Report	Rildo 34'	Stadium: Estádio do Bessa; Attendance: 5,520; Referee: Hélder Malheiro

21 August 2022 3	Casa Pia	2–0	Boavista	Lisbon
15:30 WEST (UTC+01:00)	Martins 62'; Godwin 67'	Report		Stadium: Estádio Pina Manique; Attendance: 1,136; Referee: Pierre Gaillouste

27 August 2022 4	Boavista	0–3	Benfica	Porto
18:00 WEST (UTC+01:00)		Report	Morato 30'; João Mário 67', 82' (pen.)	Stadium: Estádio do Bessa; Attendance: 10,939; Referee: João Pinheiro

5 September 2022 5	Boavista	1–0	Paços de Ferreira	Porto
19:00 WEST (UTC+01:00)	Boženík 58'	Report		Stadium: Estádio do Bessa; Attendance: 4,831; Referee: Claúdio Pereira

11 September 2022 6	Arouca	1–2	Boavista	Arouca
18:00 WEST (UTC+01:00)	Mújica 27'	Report	Sasso 31'; Tavares 70'	Stadium: Estádio Municipal de Arouca; Attendance: 1,395; Referee: João Gonçalves

17 September 2022 7	Boavista	2–1	Sporting CP	Porto
20:30 WEST (UTC+01:00)	Lourenço 45+2', 83'	Report	Edwards 55'	Stadium: Estádio do Bessa; Attendance: 8,480; Referee: João Pinheiro

2 October 2022 8	Famalicão	4–0	Boavista	Vila Nova de Famalicão
20:30 WEST (UTC+01:00)	Rodrigues 25'; Rodríguez 43'; Youssouf 52'; Assunção 85'	Report		Stadium: Estádio Municipal 22 de Junho; Attendance: 3,783; Referee: Gustavo Correia

9 October 2022 9	Boavista	1–1	Marítimo	Porto
15:30 WEST (UTC+01:00)	Pérez 23'	Report	Vidigal 527'	Stadium: Estádio do Bessa; Attendance: 11,295; Referee: Luís Godinho

23 October 2022 10	Vitória de Guimarães	3–2	Boavista	Guimarães
--:-- WEST (UTC+1)	Silva 20'; Janvier 87'; Amaro 90+3'	Report	Sasso 45+3'; Agra 71'	Stadium: Estádio D. Afonso Henriques; Attendance: 11,359; Referee: Fábio Veríssimo

30 October 2022 11	Boavista	2–2	Vizela	Porto
15:30 WEST (UTC+1)	Njie 4'; Watai 77'	Report	Pereira 7'; Zohi 27'	Stadium: Estádio do Bessa; Attendance: 5,764; Referee: Tiago Martins

6 November 2022 12	Rio Ave	1–0	Boavista	Vila do Conde
15:30 WEST (UTC+1)	Paulo Vitor (yellow card) 22'; Pedro Amaral (yellow card) 60'; Boateng 64'; João Ferreira (yellow card) 73'	Report	Onyemaechi (yellow card) 45+1'; Pérez (yellow card) 62'	Stadium: Estádio dos Arcos; Attendance: 2,546; Referee: (Portugal) Rui Costa

12 November 2022 13	Boavista	1–4	Porto	Porto
20:30 WEST (UTC+1)	Cannon (yellow card) 24' (yellow-red card) 58'; Camará (yellow card) 53'; Bruno Lourenço (yellow card) 59'; Gorré 90+1'; Makouta (yellow card) 90+3'	Report	Iván Marcano 41'; Eustáquio 64'; Galeno 83' 90+2'; Uribe (yellow card) 90'	Stadium: Estádio do Bessa; Attendance: 11,335; Referee: (Portugal) Luis Godinho

8 January 2023 15	Boavista	1–0	Gil Vicente	Porto
20:30 WEST (UTC+1)	Ricardo Mangas (yellow card) 8'; Onyemaechi (yellow card) 20'; Njie 31'; Cannon (yellow card) 57' (yellow-red card) 76'	Report	Kevin Villodres (yellow card) 36'; Tomás Araújo (yellow card) 71'	Stadium: Estádio do Bessa; Referee: (Portugal) Manuel Mota

14 January 2023 16	Braga	1–0	Boavista	Braga
20:30 WEST (UTC+1)	Paulo Oliveira (yellow card) 45'; Vitinha 46'; Al-Musrati (yellow card) 77'	Report	Ricardo Mangas (yellow card) 15'; Pedro Malheiro (yellow card) 40'; Abascal (yellow card) 80'	Stadium: Estádio Municipal de Braga; Attendance: 12,357; Referee: (Portugal) André Narciso

23 January 2023 17	Boavista	1–1	Chaves	Porto
20:15 WEST (UTC+1)	Njie 27'; Makouta (yellow card) 32'; Onyemaechi (yellow card) 70'	Report	Guima (yellow card) 66'; Euller (yellow card) 70'; Nélson Monte (yellow card) 81'; Jô 88' (yellow card) 89'	Stadium: Estádio do Bessa; Attendance: 4,011; Referee: (Portugal) João Pinheiro

29 January 2023 18	Boavista	4–2	Portimonense	Porto
18:00 WEST (UTC+1)	Abascal (yellow card) 20'; Njie 50' 81'; Onyemaechi 53'; Ricardo Mangas 75'; Pérez (yellow card) 83'	Report	Pedrão (yellow card) 9'; Moufi 55'; Paulo Estrela 83'; Welinton Júnior (yellow card) 90+4'	Stadium: Estádio do Bessa; Attendance: 4,371; Referee: (Portugal) João Ferreira

4 February 2023 19	Santa Clara	2–2	Boavista	Ponta Delgada
15:30 WEST (UTC+1)	Allano (yellow card) 12'; Diogo Calila (yellow card) 38'; Gabriel Silva 60' 86'	Report	Sasso 13' 64'; Onyemaechi (yellow card) 23'; Camará (yellow card) 70'; Ricardo Mangas (yellow card) 73'	Stadium: Estádio de São Miguel; Attendance: 1,680; Referee: (Portugal) Vitor Ferreira

9 February 2023 14	Estoril	2–1	Boavista	Estoril
18:00 WEST (UTC+1)	Tiago Araújo 49'; Mexer (yellow card) 55'; Pedro Álvaro (yellow card) 58'; Tiago Gouveia 76'	Report	Njie 4'; Camará (red card) 41'; Vukotić (yellow card) 45'; Miguel Reisinho (yellow card) 86'	Stadium: Estádio António Coimbra da Mota; Attendance: 956; Referee: (Portugal) Manuel Oliveira

13 February 2023 20	Boavista	0–0	Casa Pia	Porto
21:15 WEST (UTC+1)	Pérez (yellow card) 30' (yellow-red card) 65'; Abascal (yellow card) 87'	Report	Diogo Pinto (yellow card) 29'; Afonso Taira (yellow card) 45+2'	Stadium: Estádio do Bessa; Attendance: 3,575; Referee: (Portugal) Manuel Mota

20 February 2023 21	Benfica	3–1	Boavista	Lisbon
21:15 WEST (UTC+1)	Gilberto 55'; João Mário (yellow card) 73'; Gonçalo Ramos 82'; Musa 90+2'	Report	Bruno Lourenço (yellow card) 14'; Camará (yellow card) 18'; Njie 58'; Sasso (yellow card) 72'; Gorré (yellow card) 77'; Onyemaechi (yellow card) 88'	Stadium: Estádio da Luz; Attendance: 56,413; Referee: (Portugal) Hélder Malheiro

26 February 2023 22	Paços de Ferreira	1–3	Boavista	Paços de Ferreira
18:00 WEST (UTC+1)	Holsgrove (yellow card) 15'; Adrián Butzke 61'; Delgado (yellow card) 69'; Antunes (yellow card) 90+1'; Matchoi Djaló (yellow card) 90+7'	Report	Pedro Malheiro (yellow card) 14'; Abascal (yellow card) 16'; Njie 28' (yellow card) 90+1'; Ricardo Mangas 47'; Gorré 57' (yellow card) 63'; Makouta (yellow card) 67'; Salvador Agra (yellow card) 89'; Cannon (yellow card) 90+1'	Stadium: Estádio da Mata Real; Attendance: 54,406; Referee: (Portugal) Manuel Oliveira

3 March 2023 23	Boavista	0–0	Arouca	Porto
19:00 WEST (UTC+1)	Makouta (yellow card) 41'; Salvador Agra (yellow card) 63'	Report	Weverson (yellow card) 40'; Tiago Esgaio (yellow card) 56'; Ruiz (yellow card) 58'; Milovanov (yellow card) 67'; Galović (yellow card) 89'	Stadium: Estádio do Bessa; Attendance: 4,689; Referee: (Portugal) Luis Godinho

12 March 2023 24	Sporting CP	3–0	Boavista	Lisbon
20:30 WEST (UTC+1)	Nuno Santos 17'; Ricardo Esgaio (yellow card) 20'; Salvador Agra 43' (o.g.); Diomande (yellow card) 77'; Paulinho 90+3'	Report	Watai (yellow card) 76'	Stadium: Estádio José Alvalade; Attendance: 27,535; Referee: (Portugal) João Pinheiro

19 March 2023 25	Boavista	1–2	Famalicão	Porto
20:30 WEST (UTC+1)	Boženík 72'; Cannon (yellow card) 82'	Report	Iván Jaime 57' (pen.) (yellow card) 88'; Dobre 60'	Stadium: Estádio do Bessa; Attendance: 5,530; Referee: (Portugal) Ricardo Baixinho

2 April 2023 26	Marítimo	4–2	Boavista	Funchal
15:30 WEST (UTC+1)	André Vidigal 3' 50'; Félix Correia 22'; Xadas (yellow card) 48'; Mosquera (yellow card) 80'; Vítor Costa (yellow card) 85'; Riascos 90+6'	Report	Salvador Agra 59'; Cannon (yellow card) 65'; Boženík (yellow card) 81'; Bruno Lourenço 87'	Stadium: Estádio do Marítimo; Attendance: 9,679; Referee: (Portugal) Luis Godinho

7 April 2023 27	Boavista	2–1	Vitória de Guimarães	Porto
20:30 WEST (UTC+1)	Bruno Lourenço (yellow card) 8'; Salvador Agra 19' (yellow card) 61'; Makouta (yellow card) 37' (goal) 86'; Abascal (yellow card) 63' (red card) 90+11'; Pedro Malheiro (yellow card) 83'; Boženík (yellow card) 90+9'; Luís Santos (yellow card) 90+9'	Report	Miguel Maga (yellow card) 45+2'; André André 60' (yellow card) 68'; Afonso Freitas (yellow card) 65'; Dani Silva (yellow card) 65'; Bamba (yellow card) 84' (yellow-red card) 90+2'; Bruno Gaspar (red card) 90+12'	Stadium: Estádio do Bessa; Attendance: 5,756; Referee: (Portugal) António Nobre

17 April 2023 28	Vizela	1–1	Boavista	Vizela
20:15 WEST (UTC+1)	Pedro Ortiz (yellow card) 31'; Osama Rashid (yellow card) 83' (goal) 87'	Report	Bruno Lourenço (yellow card) 56'; Pérez (yellow card) 57'; Njie 71' (yellow card) 85'; Sasso (yellow card) 90+3'	Stadium: Estádio do FC Vizela; Attendance: 3,403; Referee: (Portugal) Hélder Carvalho

22 April 2023 29	Boavista	3–2	Rio Ave	Porto
18:00 WEST (UTC+1)	Njie 9'; Bruno Lourenço 12'; Ricardo Mangas 35'; Joel Silva (yellow card) 86'	Report	Hernâni 15'; Josué Sá (yellow card) 42'; Ruiz (red card) 62'; Boateng 85' (yellow card) 88'	Stadium: Estádio do Bessa; Attendance: 6,260; Referee: (Portugal) João Ferreira

=== Taça de Portugal ===
16 October 2022 Third round	Machico	1–0	Boavista	Machico
15:00 WEST (UTC+01:00)	Gouveia 45'	Report		Stadium: Estádio Municipal de Machico; Referee: Andre Narciso

=== Group F ===
Pos	Team	Pld	W	D	L	GF	GA	GD	Pts	
1	Boavista	3	2	1	0	4	2	+2	7	Advance to the quarter-finals
2	Vitória de Guimarães	3	0	3	0	2	2	0	3	
3	B-SAD	3	0	2	1	4	5	−1	2	
4	Vilafranquense	3	0	2	1	0	1	−1	2	

Source: Soccerway

18 November 2022 1	B-SAD	2–3	Boavista	Oeiras
20:30 WET (UTC±0)	Edgar Pacheco 20'; Saramago 25'; Silva (yellow card) 53'; Kikas (yellow card) 65'; Jójó (yellow card) 69'; Tomás Castro (yellow card) 71'; Francisco Teixeira (yellow card) 76'	Report	Luís Santos (yellow card) 32'; Ricardo Mangas 37'; Gorré 50'; Bruno Lourenço 58'	Stadium: Estádio Nacional; Referee: (Portugal) João Ferreira

27 November 2022 2	Boavista	1–0	Vilafranquense	Porto
20:45 WET (UTC±0)	Cannon (yellow card) 33'; Pérez (yellow card) 37'; Njie 79'; Camará (yellow card) 86'	Report	Luís Silva (yellow card) 24'; Léo Alaba (yellow card) 28'; Leandro Tipote (yellow card) 37'; Gabriel Pereira (yellow card) 55'	Stadium: Estádio do Bessa; Referee: (Portugal) Manuel Mota

12 December 2022 3	Boavista	0–0	Vitória de Guimarães	Porto
20:30 WET (UTC±0)	Pedro Malheiro (yellow card) 46'; Makouta (yellow card) 76'; Abascal (yellow card) 81'; Robson Reis (yellow card) 83'	Report	Jorge Fernandes (yellow card) 27'; Jota Silva (yellow card) 70' (yellow-red card) 71'; Safira (yellow card) 87'	Stadium: Estádio do Bessa; Referee: (Portugal) Carlos Macedo

=== Quarter Finals ===
20 December 2022 Quarter-finals	Académico de Viseu	2–1	Boavista	Viseu
20:15 WET (UTC±0)	Nduwarugira 56'; Igor Milioransa (yellow card) 59'; Rafael Fonseca 62'; Messeguem (yellow card) 74'; Ott (yellow card) 90+7'	Report	Pedro Malheiro (yellow card) 20'; Abascal (yellow card) 74'; Cannon (yellow card) 74'; Onyemaechi 90+6'	Stadium: Estádio do Fontelo; Attendance: 2,009; Referee: (Portugal) João Pinheiro
