= 2021–22 Boavista F.C. season =

Boavista F.C.
2021–22 season
- Chairman: Vítor Murta
- Manager: João Pedro Sousa
- Stadium: Estádio do Bessa
- Primeira Liga: 11th
- Taça de Portugal: Third round
- Taça da Liga: Semi-finals
Home colours	Away colours	Third colours

The 2021–22 season is the 72nd season in the existence of Boavista F.C. and the club's third consecutive season in the top flight of Portuguese football. In addition to the domestic league, Boavista F.C. participated in this season's editions of the Taça de Portugal and the Taça da Liga.

== Players ==
=== First-team squad ===
As of 30 December 2021

Note: Flags indicate national team as defined under FIFA eligibility rules; some limited exceptions apply. Players may hold more than one non-FIFA nationality.

No.	Pos.	Nation	Player
1	GK	BRA	Rafael Bracalli
2	DF	USA	Reggie Cannon
4	DF	POR	Tiago Ilori (on loan from Sporting CP)
6	MF	ESP	Javi García
7	MF	CUW	Kenji Gorré
8	FW	BRA	Gustavo Sauer
9	FW	CRO	Petar Musa (on loan from Slavia Prague)
10	MF	POR	Miguel Reisinho
11	FW	GAM	Yusupha Njie
13	DF	POR	Guito
14	MF	POR	Tomás Reymão
17	FW	POR	Manuel Namora
18	MF	MNE	Ilija Vukotić (on loan from Benfica B)
20	DF	POR	Filipe Ferreira
21	DF	ECU	Jackson Porozo

No.	Pos.	Nation	Player
22	DF	BRA	Nathan
24	MF	COL	Sebastián Pérez
25	DF	FRA	Yanis Hamache
26	DF	URU	Rodrigo Abascal
27	FW	VEN	Jeriel De Santis
36	FW	CMR	Paul-Georges Ntep
42	MF	CGO	Gaius Makouta
51	DF	POR	Breno
73	FW	POR	Tiago Morais
77	FW	POR	Luis Santos
78	MF	POR	Alexandre Moutinho
79	FW	POR	Pedro Malheiro
87	MF	POR	Fran Pereira
90	GK	IRI	Alireza Beiranvand (on loan from Royal Antwerp)
99	GK	POR	João Gonçalves

=== Other players under contract ===
Note: Flags indicate national team as defined under FIFA eligibility rules; some limited exceptions apply. Players may hold more than one non-FIFA nationality.

No.	Pos.	Nation	Player
3	DF	GBS	Marcelo Djaló

=== Out on loan ===
Note: Flags indicate national team as defined under FIFA eligibility rules; some limited exceptions apply. Players may hold more than one non-FIFA nationality.

No.	Pos.	Nation	Player
—	DF	NGR	Chidozie Awaziem (at Alanyaspor until 30 June 2022)
—	DF	POR	Ricardo Mangas (at Bordeaux until 30 June 2022)
—	FW	HON	Alberth Elis (at Bordeaux until 30 June 2022)
—	FW	ESP	Diego Llorente (at El Ejido until 30 June 2022)
—	FW	BRA	Juninho (at Chaves until 30 June 2022)

== Pre-season and friendlies ==
Win Draw Loss Fixtures

== Competitions ==
=== Overall record ===
Competition	First match	Last match	Starting round	Final position	Record							
Competition	First match	Last match	Starting round	Final position	Pld	W	D	L	GF	GA	GD	Win %
Primeira Liga	9 August 2021	May 2022	Matchday 1		31	6	15	10	34	48	−14	19.35
Taça de Portugal	17 October 2021		Third round	Third round	1	0	0	1	0	4	−4	0.00
Taça da Liga	25 July 2021	25 January 2022	First round	Semi-finals	5	4	1	0	11	3	+8	80.00
Total					37	10	16	11	45	55	−10	27.03

Last updated: 25 April 2022
Source: Soccerway

=== Primeira Liga ===
==== League table ====
Pos	Team	Pld	W	D	L	GF	GA	GD	Pts
10	Marítimo	34	9	11	14	39	44	−5	38 (Note: Head-to-head points: Marítimo 10, Paços de Ferreira 8, Boavista 7, Portimonense 6.)
11	Paços de Ferreira	34	9	11	14	29	44	−15	38
12	Boavista	34	7	17	10	39	52	−13	38
13	Portimonense	34	10	8	16	31	45	−14	38
14	Vizela	34	7	12	15	37	58	−21	33

Source: Liga Portugal
Rules for classification: 1) Points; 2) Head-to-head points; 3) Head-to-head goal difference; 4) Head-to-head away goals scored; 5) Goal difference; 6) Matches won; 7) Goals scored; 8) Play-off.

==== Results summary ====
Overall								Home						Away					
Pld	W	D	L	GF	GA	GD	Pts	W	D	L	GF	GA	GD	W	D	L	GF	GA	GD
26	4	15	7	31	39	−8	27	3	9	1	18	15	+3	1	6	6	13	24	−11

Last updated: August 2021.
Source: Liga Portugal

==== Results by round ====
Round	1	2	3	4	5	6	7	8	9	10
Ground	A	H	H	A	H	A	H	A	H	A
Result										
Position										

Updated to match(es) played on August 2021. Source: Liga Portugal
A = Away; H = Home; W = Win; D = Draw; L = Loss

==== Matches ====
9 August 2021 1	Gil Vicente	3–0	Boavista	Barcelos
20:15 WEST (UTC+1)		Report		Stadium: Estádio Cidade de Barcelos; Attendance: 2,014; Referee: Claúdio Pereira

16 August 2021 2	Boavista	3–0	Paços de Ferreira	Porto
19:00 WEST (UTC+1)		Report		Stadium: Estádio do Bessa; Attendance: 2,842; Referee: António Nobre

23 August 2021 3	Boavista	2–0	Santa Clara	Porto
21:15 WEST (UTC+1)		Report		Stadium: Estádio do Bessa; Attendance: 2,799; Referee: Tiago Martins

28 August 2021 4	Vizela	1–1	Boavista	Vizela
15:30 WEST (UTC+1)		Report		Stadium: Estádio do FC Vizela; Attendance: 1,243; Referee: Rui Costa

12 September 2021 5	Boavista	1–1	Portimonense	Porto
18:00 WEST (UTC+1)	Musa 90+2'	Report	Carlinhos 45'	Stadium: Estádio do Bessa; Attendance: 2,416; Referee: André Narciso

20 September 2021 6	Benfica	3–1	Boavista	Lisbon
19:00 WEST (UTC+1)	Núñez 14', 61'; Weigl 34'; Veríssimo (yellow card) 59'	Report	Sauer 32'; Nathan (yellow card) 36'; Porozo (yellow card) 69'; Musa (yellow card) 74'	Stadium: Estádio da Luz; Attendance: 23,000; Referee: Hugo Miguel

27 September 2021 7	Boavista	1–1	Estoril	Porto
21:15 WEST (UTC+1)		Report		Stadium: Estádio do Bessa; Attendance: 2,094; Referee: Miguel Nogueira

3 October 2021 8	Braga	2–2	Boavista	Braga
20:30 WEST (UTC+1)	Medeiros 25'; R. Horta 52'	Report	Musa 12'; Njie 89'	Stadium: Estádio Municipal de Braga; Attendance: 7,058; Referee: Luís Godinho

25 October 2021 9	Boavista	0–0	Belenenses SAD	Porto
21:15 WEST (UTC+1)		Report		Stadium: Estádio do Bessa; Attendance: 2,043; Referee: João Pinheiro

30 October 2021 10	Porto	4–1	Boavista	Porto
17:00 WEST (UTC+1)	Díaz 21'; Evanilson 41', 47'; Loader 90+6'	Report	Hamache 30'	Stadium: Estádio do Dragão; Attendance: 31,207; Referee: Tiago Martins

27 November 2021 12	Arouca	2–1	Boavista	Arouca
18:00 WET (UTC±0)	Dabbagh 11', (yellow card) 49'; Bukia (yellow card) 68'; Campi (yellow card) 69'; Antony 90+1'	Report	Yusupha (yellow card) 28'; Vukotić (yellow card) 36'; Musa 54'; Makouta (yellow card) 71'; Malheiro (yellow card) 89'	Stadium: Estádio Municipal de Arouca; Attendance: 988; Referee: João Pinheiro

11 December 2021 14	Sporting CP	2–0	Boavista	Lisbon
20:30 WET (UTC±0)	Sarabia 53'; Nuno Santos 59'	Report		Stadium: Estádio José Alvalade; Attendance: 18,551; Referee: Nuno Almeida

18 February 2022 23	Boavista	2–2	Benfica	Porto
20:15 WET (UTC±00:00)	Pérez (yellow card) 40'; García (yellow card) 47'; Gorré (yellow card) 69'; Gustavo 74'; Makouta 80'; Musa (yellow card) 84'; Hamache (yellow card) 90'	Report	Weigl (yellow card) 15'; Taarabt 21'; Otamendi (yellow card) 27'; Grimaldo 30', (yellow card) 84'	Stadium: Estádio do Bessa; Attendance: 7,903; Referee: Rui Costa

5 March 2022 25	Boavista	1–1	Braga	Porto
15:30 WET (UTC±0)	Njie 53'	Report	R. Horta 37' (pen.)	Stadium: Estádio do Bessa; Attendance: 5,139; Referee: Manuel Oliveira

12 March 2022 26	Belenenses SAD	0–0	Boavista	Oeiras
20:30 WET (UTC±0)		Report		Stadium: Estádio Nacional; Attendance: 683; Referee: Nuno Almeida

20 March 2022 27	Boavista	0–1	Porto	Porto
20:45 WET (UTC±0)		Report	Vieira 32'; Evanilson (penalty missed) 62'	Stadium: Estádio do Bessa; Attendance: 11,251; Referee: Artur Soares Dias

25 April 2022 31	Boavista	0–3	Sporting CP	Porto
20:30 WEST (UTC+1)		Report	Nunes 37'; Abascal 58' (o.g.); Tabata 83' (pen.)	Stadium: Estádio do Bessa; Referee: Manuel Mota

=== Taça de Portugal ===
17 October 2021 Third round	Rio Ave	4–0	Boavista	Vila do Conde
20:00 WEST (UTC+1)	Zé Manuel 14' (pen.); Guga 73'; Gabrielzinho 86', 89'	Report		Stadium: Estádio dos Arcos; Referee: Rui Costa

=== Taça da Liga ===
25 July 2021 First round	Marítimo	0–1	Boavista	Funchal
18:00 WEST (UTC+1)		Report	Luís Santos 41'	Stadium: Estádio do Marítimo; Attendance: 1,546; Referee: Manuel Oliveira

1 August 2021 Second round	Boavista	2–0	Portimonense	Porto
20:30 WEST (UTC+1)	Morais 8', 73'	Report		Stadium: Estádio do Bessa; Attendance: 1,068; Referee: João Gonçalves

23 September 2021 Third round	Paços de Ferreira	1–2	Boavista	Paços de Ferreira
18:00 WEST (UTC+1)	João Pedro 20'	Report	Njie 58'; Sauer 73'	Stadium: Estádio da Mata Real; Attendance: 988; Referee: Vitor Ferreira

16 December 2021 Third round	Boavista	5–1	Braga	Porto
20:15 WET (UTC+0)	Sauer 20', 63'; Musa 32'; Njie 34'; Nathan 50'	Report	Medeiros 53' (pen.)	Stadium: Estádio do Bessa; Attendance: 2,094; Referee: Manuel Oliveira

25 January 2022 Semi-finals	Benfica	1–1 (3–2 p)	Boavista	Leiria
19:45 WET (UTC+0)	Everton 16'; Bernardo (yellow card) 29'	Report	Musa (yellow card) 17'; Abascal (yellow card) 36'; Makouta (yellow card) 46'; Gustavo 53' (pen.)	Stadium: Estádio Municipal de Leiria; Referee: Fábio Veríssimo
	Penalties
	Pizzi (penalty missed); Grimaldo (penalty scored); Meïté (penalty scored); Vertonghen (penalty missed); Weigl (penalty scored)		(penalty missed) Pérez; (penalty missed) Musa; (penalty missed) De Santis; (penalty scored) Abascal; (penalty scored) Hamache

=== Appearances and goals ===
As of 30 December 2021

No.	Pos	Nat	Player	Total		Primeira Liga		Taça de Portugal		Taça da Liga	
No.	Pos	Nat	Player	Apps	Goals	Apps	Goals	Apps	Goals	Apps	Goals
Goalkeepers
1	GK	(Brazil) BRA	Rafael Bracali	13	0	9	0	1	0	3	0
90	GK	(Iran) IRI	Alireza Beiranvand	9	0	8	0	0	0	1	0
99	GK	(Portugal) POR	João Gonçalves	0	0	0	0	0	0	0	0
Defenders
2	DF	(United States) USA	Reggie Cannon	8	0	6	0	1	0	1	0
3	DF	(Guinea-Bissau) GBS	Marcelo Djaló	3	0	1	0	1	0	1	0
4	DF	(Portugal) POR	Tiago Ilori	7	1	5	1	1	0	1	0
13	DF	(Portugal) POR	Guito	0	0	0	0	0	0	0	0
20	DF	(Portugal) POR	Filipe Ferreira	13	0	11	0	0	0	2	0
21	DF	(Ecuador) ECU	Jackson Porozo	14	0	10	0	0	0	4	0
22	DF	(Brazil) BRA	Nathan Santos	17	1	14	0	1	0	2	1
25	DF	(France) FRA	Yanis Hamache	18	3	14	3	1	0	3	0
26	DF	(Uruguay) URU	Rodrigo Abascal	13	0	11	0	0	0	2	0
51	DF	(Portugal) POR	Breno Teixeira	1	0	0	0	0	0	1	0
79	DF	(Portugal) POR	Pedro Malheiro	13	0	10	0	0	0	3	0
Midfielders
6	MF	(Spain) ESP	Javi García	12	1	9	1	1	0	2	0
10	MF	(Portugal) POR	Miguel Reisinho	4	0	2	0	0	0	2	0
14	MF	(Portugal) POR	Tomás Reymão	14	0	9	0	1	0	4	0
18	MF	(Montenegro) MNE	Ilija Vukotić	15	0	12	0	1	0	2	0
24	MF	(Colombia) COL	Seba Pérez	20	0	15	0	1	0	4	0
42	MF	(Republic of the Congo) CGO	Gaius Makouta	17	0	14	0	1	0	2	0
78	MF	(Portugal) POR	Alexandre Moutinho	0	0	0	0	0	0	0	0
80	MF	(Portugal) POR	Bernardo Silva	0	0	0	0	0	0	0	0
87	MF	(Portugal) POR	Fran Pereira	2	0	0	0	0	0	2	0
Forwards
7	FW	(Curaçao) CUW	Kenji Gorré	16	0	14	0	1	0	1	0
8	FW	(Brazil) BRA	Gustavo Sauer	19	7	15	4	1	0	3	3
9	FW	(Croatia) CRO	Petar Musa	15	6	12	5	1	0	2	1
11	FW	(The Gambia) GAM	Yusupha Njie	20	5	16	3	1	0	3	2
17	FW	(Portugal) POR	Manuel Namora	0	0	0	0	0	0	0	0
27	FW	(Venezuela) VEN	Jeriel De Santis	6	1	4	1	0	0	2	0
36	FW	(Cameroon) CMR	Paul-Georges Ntep	9	0	7	0	0	0	2	0
73	FW	(Portugal) POR	Tiago Morais	12	2	9	0	1	0	2	2
77	FW	(Portugal) POR	Luis Santos	6	1	4	0	0	0	2	1
Players who made an appearance and/or had a squad number but left the team.
	MF	(Brazil) BRA	Paulinho	1	0	0	0	0	0	1	0
	DF	(Portugal) POR	Ricardo Mangas	1	0	0	0	0	0	1	0
	DF	(Nigeria) NGR	Chidozie Awaziem	3	0	3	0	0	0	0	0
