= Masaki Watai =

Japanese footballer

Masaki Watai 渡井 理己
Personal information
- Date of birth: 18 July 1999 (age 27)
- Place of birth: Fujinomiya, Japan
- Height: 1.68 m (5 ft 6 in)
- Position: Attacking midfielder

Team information
- Current team: Kashiwa Reysol
- Number: 11

Youth career
- 2015–2017: Shizuoka Gakuen High School

Senior career*
Years	Team	Apps	(Gls)
2018–2024	Tokushima Vortis	119	(14)
2022–2024	→ Boavista (loan)	28	(1)
2025–	Kashiwa Reysol	28	(1)
- * Club domestic league appearances and goals as of 10 August 2026

Masaki Watai (渡井 理己, Watai Masaki; born 18 July 1999) is a Japanese professional footballer who plays as an attacking midfielder for Kashiwa Reysol.

== Career ==
Watai was born in Shizuoka Prefecture on 18 July 1999. After graduating from Shizuoka Gakuen High School, he joined J2 League club Tokushima Vortis in 2018. On 6 June, he debuted against Tochigi SC in Emperor's Cup.

Watai was loaned to Portuguese club, Boavista for the 2022–23 season. On 8 July 2023, Watai was again sent on a season-long loan to Boavista, this time with a future option to buy.

On 29 December 2024, Watai announce official transfer to J1 club, Kashiwa Reysol from 2025 season.

== Career statistics ==
As of the start from 2025 season.

Appearances and goals by club, season and competition
Club	Season	League			National cup (Note: Includes Emperor's Cup, Taça de Portugal)		League cup (Note: Includes J. League Cup, Taça da Liga)		Other		Total	
Club	Season	Division	Apps	Goals	Apps	Goals	Apps	Goals	Apps	Goals	Apps	Goals
Tokushima Vortis	2018	J2 League	0	0	1	0	—		—		1	0
Tokushima Vortis	2019	J2 League	29	6	2	0	—		2 (Note: Appearances in J2 League promotion play-offs)	0	33	6
Tokushima Vortis	2020	J2 League	38	6	2	0	—		—		40	6
Tokushima Vortis	2021	J1 League	27	1	1	0	5	0	—		33	1
Tokushima Vortis	2022	J2 League	19	1	1	0	2	0	—		22	1
Tokushima Vortis	2024	J2 League	6	0	0	0	—				6	0
Tokushima Vortis	Total		119	14	7	0	7	0	2	0	135	14
Boavista (loan)	2022–23	Primeira Liga	15	1	1	0	2	0	—		18	1
Boavista (loan)	2023–24	Primeira Liga	13	0	1	0	1	0	—		15	0
Boavista (loan)	Total		28	1	2	0	3	0	—		33	1
Kashiwa Reysol	2025	J1 League	0	0	0	0	0	0	—		0	0
Career total			147	15	9	0	10	0	2	0	168	15

== Honours ==
Tokushima Vortis

- J2 League: 2020
