= Sebastián Pérez (footballer, born 1993) =

Colombian footballer

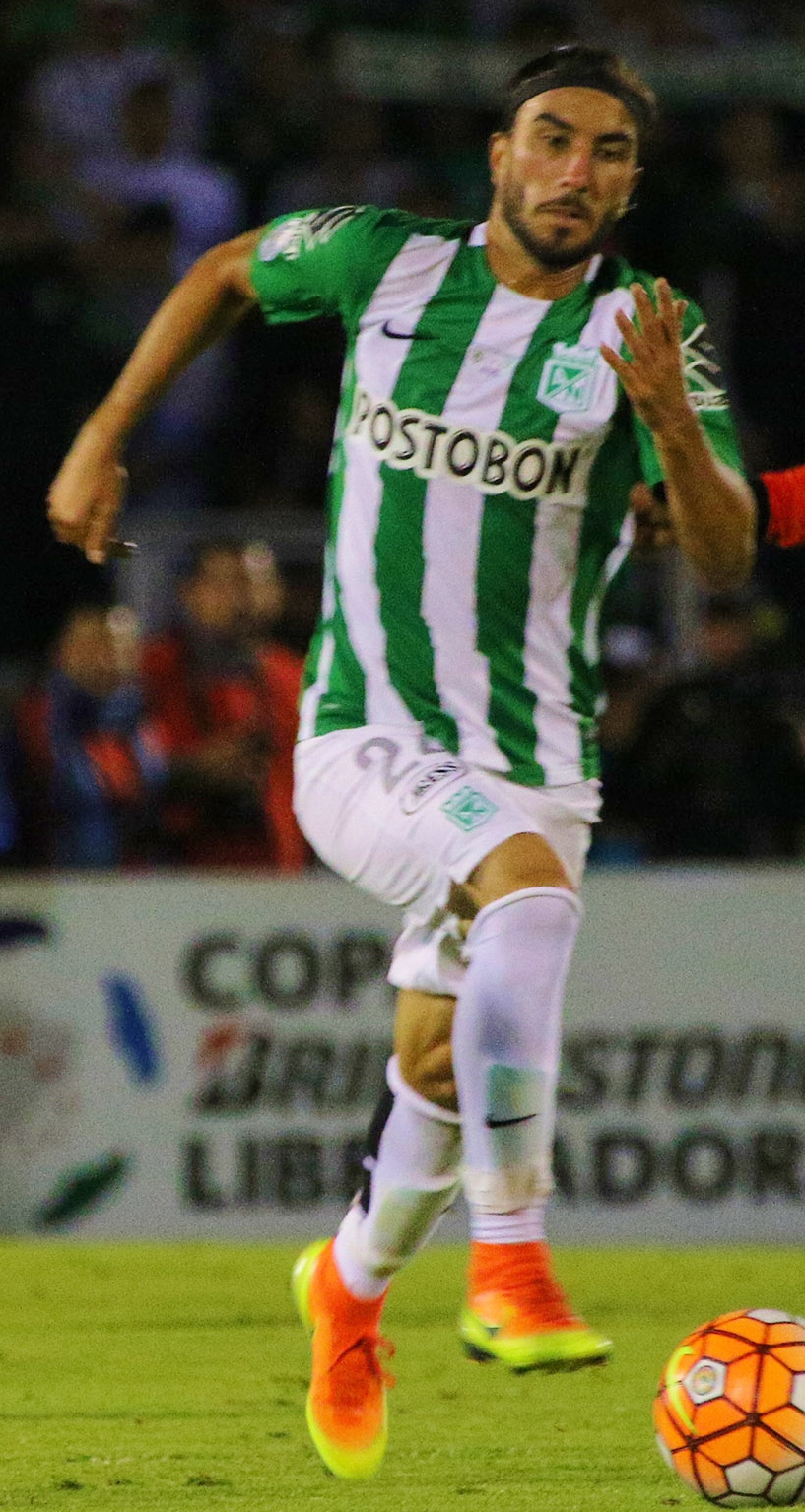
- Pérez with Atlético Nacional in 2016

Personal information
- Full name: Sebastián Pérez Cardona
- Date of birth: 29 March 1993 (age 33)
- Place of birth: Envigado, Colombia
- Height: 1.75 m (5 ft 9 in)
- Position: Defensive midfielder

Team information
- Current team: Casa Pia
- Number: 24

Youth career
- 2006–2010: Atlético Nacional

Senior career*
Years	Team	Apps	(Gls)
2011–2016	Atlético Nacional	119	(2)
2016–2021	Boca Juniors	15	(0)
2018	→ Pachuca (loan)	0	(0)
2019	→ Barcelona SC (loan)	24	(0)
2020–2021	→ Boavista (loan)	16	(2)
2021–2025	Boavista	116	(4)
2025–	Casa Pia	28	(0)

International career^{‡}
2011–2013	Colombia U20	16	(0)
2015–2016	Colombia Olympic	7	(0)
2016–2021	Colombia	10	(1)
Medal record
Colombia
Copa América Centenario
Bronze medal – third place	2016 United States
Copa América
Third place	2021 Brazil
- * Club domestic league appearances and goals as of 18 May 2026 ‡ National team caps and goals as of 19:42, 21 June 2021 (UTC)

Sebastián Pérez Cardona (born 29 March 1993), sometimes known as Seba Pérez, is a Colombian professional footballer who plays as a defensive midfielder for Portuguese Primeira Liga club Casa Pia.

He is known for his abilities to react quickly and his skills playing both in a defensive and an attacking role. He was referenced earlier in his career by media abroad his native Colombia as a highly rated top prospect in Colombia.

== Club career ==
=== Atlético Nacional ===
On 4 March 2011, Pérez made his official debut for Nacional against Atlético Junior, replacing Macnelly Torres in the 86th minute. He would eventually win the 2011 Torneo Apertura with Los Verdolagas, making him the youngest player to win the honour at age 18. The following year, he was part of the Nacional squad that won both the Copa Colombia and the Superliga Colombiana, thus winning every top tier trophy in Colombia before the age of 20.

Following Colombia's exit from the 2013 FIFA U-20 World Cup, he was invited to Arsenal for a trial in August. He came on as a sub in the 67th minute for Arsenal's friendly against Manchester City, wearing the number 32 jersey. Arsenal went on to win the game 3–1. Despite only playing for 26 minutes, Pérez was praised for his natural abilities despite being so young. Arsène Wenger stated that he was impressed with Pérez during the week trial and decided to add him in the game. Despite impressing both the London club and its fans, Pérez was unable to get a work-permit because 'he had yet to play at least 75% of Colombia's international matches'. Thus, he was sent back to Nacional. Despite this, Wenger claimed that he would continue monitoring Perez until an opportunity to sign him comes.

On 27 July 2016, Pérez and Atlético Nacional conquered the 2016 Copa Libertadores. This was his first major title. Before leaving Nacional, Pérez had converted himself into one of the most decorated players in Atlético Nacional's history, achieving ten titles with the club.

=== Boca Juniors ===
In 2016, Pérez signed with Argentinian club Boca Juniors. He could not play for the team from April 2017 to January 2018, due to an ACL injury.

=== Pachuca ===
In September 2018 he was loaned out to Pachuca. He made his debut on 26 September in a 3–0 victory against Cafetaleros de Chiapas as part of the Copa MX. However, that ended up being his first and only game for the club and he only made one other substitute appearance.

=== Barcelona S.C. ===
On 3 January 2019, Pérez transferred to Barcelona S.C. of Ecuador. He made his debut for the club on 6 February against Defensor Sporting in the 2019 Copa Libertadores. He later played 24 league games in the 2019 Ecuadorian Serie A without scoring any goals.

=== Boavista ===
On 19 September 2020, his loan to Primeira Liga club Boavista was announced. On 31 August 2021, Boavista exercised the option in the loan contract to purchase his rights permanently and signed a four-year contract with Pérez.

=== Casa Pia ===
On 30 July 2025, after five seasons at Boavista, Pérez moved to Primeira Liga side Casa Pia, signing a two-year contract, with an option for a further year.

== International career ==
=== Youth ===
Pérez first represented the U20 Colombia national team in 2011, where he took part in the 2011 FIFA U-20 World Cup that took place in his home land. He was then recalled for the 2013 South American Youth Championship, where Colombia eventually won the championship and qualified for the 2013 FIFA U-20 World Cup. There, Pérez would give impressive performances, attracting the likes of top European teams.

=== Senior ===
Pérez received his first call-up from the senior Colombia national team under the order of José Pékerman to face Bolivia and Ecuador for the 2018 World Cup qualifiers. He earned his first cap against Bolivia, being included in the starting 11 and playing 62 minutes before being replaced by Edwin Cardona. Colombia went on to win in La Paz 2–3. His first international goal came in the next qualifying game against Ecuador in Barranquilla on 29 March 2016. Assisted by Cardona, Pérez scored an acrobatic goal in the 3–1 victory.

In May 2018, he was named in Colombia's preliminary 35-man squad for the 2018 World Cup in Russia. However, he did not make the final cut.

== Style of play ==
"In European football, I admire Éver Banega, Fernando Gago, Sergio Busquets, Xavi, Xabi Alonso and Andrea Pirlo, I am excited about playing in Europe. I want to go there and try to make it, but I am driven by those I grew up with. They had the same dreams as me, but perhaps not the same talent. There's luck involved, but also a lot of discipline. You need that to make the most of the talent you have."

— Pérez, speaking of his opportunity with a trial at Arsenal and his inspirations that led to his playing style.

Pérez was an amateur footballer, before joining Nacional in 2011, and yet was considered to be a 'pure natural talent' by the Colombian club. He is a well-known versatile player mostly because of his ability to use both feet accurately, as well as carrying 'panoramic vision' as shown through his accurate passing. Despite committing to a defensive midfielder most of the time, Pérez has shown that he is capable of shooting with precision from great distances. He is often regarded very high by many top teams such as Juventus and Paris Saint-Germain because of his potential, led to being almost being signed by each respective club at one point.

Pérez also spoke that committing to a defensive midfielder (as well as an overall midfielder in general) role throughout most of his games, was because of his admiration for Xavi, Xabi Alonso and Andrea Pirlo, that inspired him to make a difference in both defending and attacking. This is one of the reasons why he is often seen as a crucial player in counter-attacking.

== Personal life ==
Pérez married Manuela Restrepo in 2015. In July 2016, the couple had their first child, a son. In 2017, Pérez became a vegan for ethical reasons.

== Career statistics ==
=== Club ===
As of match played 22 October 2023

Club performance			League		National cup		League cup		Continental		Other		Total	
Club	Season	League	Apps	Goals	Apps	Goals	Apps	Goals	Apps	Goals	Apps	Goals	Apps	Goals
Atlético Nacional	2011	Categoría Primera A	33	0	6	0	—		—		—		39	0
Atlético Nacional	2012	Categoría Primera A	15	0	12	0	—		4 (Note: Appearance(s) in Copa Libertadores)	0	—		31	0
Atlético Nacional	2013	Categoría Primera A	11	0	6	2	—		0	0	—		17	2
Atlético Nacional	2014	Categoría Primera A	29	1	10	0	—		3 (Note: Appearance(s) in Copa Sudamericana)	0	2 (Note: Appearance(s) in Superliga Colombiana)	0	44	1
Atlético Nacional	2015	Categoría Primera A	25	1	0	0	—		1	0	2	0	28	1
Atlético Nacional	2016	Categoría Primera A	6	0	0	0	—		12	0	2	1	20	1
Atlético Nacional	Total		119	2	34	2	—		20	0	6	1	179	5
Boca Juniors	2016–17	Primera División	12	0	0	0	—		—		—		12	0
Boca Juniors	2017–18	Primera División	3	0	0	0	—		4	0	—		7	0
Boca Juniors	Total		15	0	0	0	—		4	0	—		19	0
Pachuca (loan)	2018–19	Liga MX	0	0	1	0	—		—		—		1	0
Barcelona SC (loan)	2019	Ecuadorian Serie A	24	0	—		—		1	0	—		25	0
Boavista (loan)	2020–21	Primeira Liga	16	2	1	0	—		—		—		17	2
Boavista	2021–22	Primeira Liga	30	0	1	0	5	0	—		—		36	0
Boavista	2022–23	Primeira Liga	29	3	1	0	4	0	—		—		34	3
Boavista	2023–24	Primeira Liga	7	0	1	1	1	0	—		—		9	1
Boavista	Total		82	5	4	1	10	0	—		—		96	6
Career total			240	7	39	3	10	0	25	0	6	1	320	11

=== International ===
As of match played 21 June 2021

Appearances and goals by national team and year
National team	Year	Apps	Goals
Colombia	2016	8	1
Colombia	2021	2	0
Total		10	1

As of match played 21 June 2021
Scores and results list Colombia's goal tally first, score column indicates score after each Pérez goal

List of international goals scored by Sebastián Pérez
#	Date	Venue	Opponent	Score	Final	Competition
1.	29 March 2016	Estadio Metropolitano Roberto Meléndez, Barranquilla, Colombia	Ecuador	2–0	3–1	2018 FIFA World Cup qualification

== Honours ==
=== Club ===
Atlético Nacional

- Categoría Primera A (5): 2011-I, 2013-I, 2013-II, 2014-I, 2015-II
- Copa Colombia (2): 2012, 2013
- Superliga Colombiana (2): 2012, 2016
- Copa Libertadores (1): 2016

Boca Juniors

- Primera División (1): 2016–17

=== International ===
Colombia

- Copa América: Third place (2)2016, 2021
- South American Youth Championship: 2013
