= Rodrigo Abascal =

Uruguayan footballer (born 1994)

Personal information
- Full name: Rodrigo Abascal Barros
- Date of birth: 14 January 1994 (age 32)
- Place of birth: Montevideo, Uruguay
- Height: 1.87 m (6 ft 2 in)
- Position: Centre-back

Team information
- Current team: Al-Riyadh
- Number: 26

Youth career
- Fénix

Senior career*
Years	Team	Apps	(Gls)
2015–2019	Fénix	66	(2)
2017–2019	→ Juventud (loan)	12	(0)
2019–2021	Peñarol	34	(1)
2021–2025	Boavista	113	(3)
2025–2026	Vitória Guimarães	27	(1)
2026–	Al-Riyadh	6	(1)
- * Club domestic league appearances and goals as of 13 September 2026

Rodrigo Abascal Barros (born 14 January 1994) is a Uruguayan professional footballer who plays as a centre-back for Saudi Pro League club Al-Riyadh.

== Career ==
On 26 July 2021, Abascal signed a three-year contract with Primeira Liga club Boavista.

On 14 January 2024, he scored a free-kick from behind the halfway line, in a 4–1 league victory away at Vizela.

In the summer of 2025, Abascal signed a two-year contract with Primeira Liga club Vitória de Guimarães. On 10 January 2026, Abascal played in the Portuguese Taça da Liga final against Braga in which Vitória Guimarães won 2-1.

For the 2026/27 season, he signed for Saudi Pro League club Al-Riyadh. In his first official match for the club he received a red card in the 6th minute.

== Honours ==
Vitória SC

- Taça da Liga: 2025–26

== Career statistics ==
As of match played 8 November 2025

Appearances and goals by club, season and competition
Club	Season	League			National cup		League cup		Continental		Total	
Club	Season	Division	Apps	Goals	Apps	Goals	Apps	Goals	Apps	Goals	Apps	Goals
Fénix	2014–15	Uruguayan Primera División	5	0	—		—		—		5	0
Fénix	2015–16	Uruguayan Primera División	8	0	—		—		—		8	0
Fénix	2016	Uruguayan Primera División	7	0	—		—		1 (Note: Appearance(s) in Copa Sudamericana)	0	8	0
Fénix	2017	Uruguayan Primera División	6	0	—		—		—		6	0
Fénix	2018	Uruguayan Primera División	26	2	—		—		—		26	2
Fénix	2019	Uruguayan Primera División	14	0	—		—		—		14	0
Fénix	Total		66	2	—		—		1	0	67	2
Juventud (loan)	2017	Uruguayan Primera División	12	0	—		—		—		12	0
Peñarol	2019	Uruguayan Primera División	14	0	—		—		0	0	14	0
Peñarol	2020	Uruguayan Primera División	17	1	—		—		3 (Note: Appearances in Copa Libertadores)	0	20	1
Peñarol	2021	Uruguayan Primera División	3	0	—		—		3	0	6	0
Peñarol	Total		34	1	—		—		6	0	40	1
Boavista	2021–22	Primeira Liga	28	1	0	0	3	0	—		31	1
Boavista	2022–23	Primeira Liga	27	0	0	0	4	0	—		31	0
Boavista	2023–24	Primeira Liga	29	2	1	0	1	0	—		31	2
Boavista	2024–25	Primeira Liga	29	0	1	0	—		—		30	0
Boavista	Total		113	3	2	0	8	0	—		123	3
Vitória Guimarães	2025–26	Primeira Liga	10	0	1	0	0	0	—		11	0
Career total			235	6	3	0	8	0	7	0	253	6
