= Gaius Makouta =

Congolese footballer (born 1997)

Personal information
- Date of birth: 25 July 1997 (age 29)
- Place of birth: Beaumont-sur-Oise, France
- Height: 1.80 m (5 ft 11 in)
- Position: Midfielder

Team information
- Current team: Alanyaspor
- Number: 42

Youth career
- –2015: Le Havre
- 2015–2016: Créteil-Lusitanos

Senior career*
Years	Team	Apps	(Gls)
2014–2015	Le Havre II	2	(0)
2016	Longford Town	7	(0)
2017	Aris	5	(0)
2017–2019	Sporting da Covilhã	42	(2)
2019–2021	Braga B	22	(2)
2020–2021	→ Beroe (loan)	37	(9)
2021–2024	Boavista	93	(6)
2024–	Alanyaspor	67	(2)

International career^{‡}
2019–	Congo	20	(2)
- * Club domestic league appearances and goals as of 10 June 2026 ‡ National team caps and goals as of 28 June 2024

Gaius Makouta (born 25 July 1997) is a professional footballer who plays as a midfielder for Süper Lig club Alanyaspor. Born in France, he plays for the Congo national team.

== Club career ==
In February 2019 he joined Braga.

In January 2020 Makouta was loaned to Beroe.

On 27 June 2021, he signed a three-year contract with Boavista.

On 26 July 2024, Makouta moved to Alanyaspor in Turkey on a three-season deal.

== International career ==
Born in France and of Republic of the Congo descent, Makouta was called up to the Congo in October 2019.

== Personal life ==
He is the grandson of Jean-Pierre Makouta-Mboukou, a Congolese politician and a famous writer and researcher in linguistics.

== Career statistics ==
=== Club ===
As of match played 22 October 2023

Appearances and goals by club, season and competition
Club	Season	League			National cup		League cup		Total	
Club	Season	Division	Apps	Goals	Apps	Goals	Apps	Goals	Apps	Goals
Le Havre II	2014–15	CFA 2	2	0	—		—		2	0
Longford Town	2016	Premier Division	7	0	0	0	—		7	0
Aris	2016–17	Football League	5	0	1	0	—		6	0
Sporting da Covilhã	2017–18	LigaPro	24	0	0	0	1	0	25	0
Sporting da Covilhã	2018–19	LigaPro	18	2	3	1	1	0	22	3
Sporting da Covilhã	Total		42	2	3	1	2	0	47	3
Braga B	2018–19	LigaPro	14	2	—		—		14	2
Braga B	2019–20	Campeonato de Portugal	8	0	—		—		8	0
Braga B	Total		22	2	—		—		22	2
Beroe (loan)	2019–20	PFG	11	2	0	0	—		11	2
Beroe (loan)	2020–21	PFG	26	7	2	2	—		28	9
Beroe (loan)	Total		37	9	2	2	—		39	11
Boavista	2021–22	Primeira Liga	31	2	1	0	3	0	35	2
Boavista	2022–23	Primeira Liga	32	2	1	0	4	0	37	2
Boavista	2023–24	Primeira Liga	8	0	1	0	1	0	10	0
Boavista	Total		71	4	3	0	8	0	82	4
Career total			186	17	9	3	10	0	205	20

=== International ===
Scores and results list Congo's goal tally first, score column indicates score after each Makouta goal.

List of international goals scored by Gaius Makouta
No.	Date	Venue	Opponent	Score	Result	Competition
1	10 October 2019	Leo Stadium, Thanyaburi, Thailand	Thailand	1–1	1–1	Friendly
2	10 September 2023	Independence Stadium, Bakau, The Gambia	Gambia	0–1	2–2	2023 Africa Cup of Nations qualification

== Honours ==
Boavista

- Primeira Liga Midfielder of the Month: August 2023
