= Rildo =

Male given name

Rildo is a male given name. It may refer to:

- Rildo (footballer, born 1942) (1942–2021), Rildo da Costa Menezes, Brazilian football defender
- Rildo (footballer, born 1989), Rildo de Andrade Felicissimo, Brazilian football forward
- Rildo (footballer, born 2000), Rildo Gonçalves de Amorim Filho, Brazilian football attacking midfielder for Santa Clara
