= João Gonçalves (footballer, born 2000) =

Portuguese footballer (born 2000)

Personal information
- Full name: João Pedro Oliveira Gonçalves
- Date of birth: 5 November 2000 (age 26)
- Place of birth: Matosinhos, Portugal
- Height: 1.88 m (6 ft 2 in)
- Position: Goalkeeper

Team information
- Current team: Nacional
- Number: 13

Youth career
- 2008–2012: Leixões
- 2012–2014: Padroense
- 2015–2016: Leça do Balio
- 2016–2017: Salgueiros
- 2017–2019: Boavista

Senior career*
Years	Team	Apps	(Gls)
2018–2019	Boavista B	2	(0)
2019–2025	Boavista	39	(0)
2020–2021	Boavista U23	19	(0)
2025–2026	AVS	6	(0)
2026	Universitatea Craiova	0	(0)
2026–	Nacional	0	(0)

International career
2021	Portugal U21	1	(0)
- * Club domestic league appearances and goals as of 21 April 2026

João Pedro Oliveira Gonçalves (born 5 November 2000) is a Portuguese professional footballer who plays as a goalkeeper for Primeira Liga club Nacional.

== Professional career ==
Gonçalves is a youth product of Leixões, Padroense, Leça do Balio, Salgueiros and Boavista. He was the backup goalkeeper for Boavista since 2019, and signed a professional contract with them on 29 July 2022 until 2025. He made his senior and professional debut with them 3 years intro his senior stint with them in a 1–0 Taça de Portugal loss to Machico on 16 October 2022. On 4 July 2023, he extended his professional contract with the club until 2027. In August 2023, he was named the starting goalkeeper for Boavista in advance of the 2022–23 season.

On 31 July 2025, following Boavista's relegation from the Primeira Liga, Gonçalves joined fellow top-division side AVS, signing a three-year deal. On 29 January 2026, having made eight appearances for the club, his contract with AVS was terminated by mutual agreement.

== International career ==
Gonçalves is a youth international for Portugal, having played for the Portugal U21s in September 2021.

== Career statistics ==
As of match played 17 December 2025

Appearances and goals by club, season and competition
Club	Season	League			National cup (Note: Includes Taça de Portugal)		Europe		Other		Total	
Club	Season	Division	Apps	Goals	Apps	Goals	Apps	Goals	Apps	Goals	Apps	Goals
Boavista B	2018–19	AF Porto 1ª Divisão	2	0	—		—		—		2	0
Boavista	2019–20	Primeira Liga	0	0	0	0	—		0	0	0	0
Boavista	2020–21	Primeira Liga	0	0	0	0	—		0	0	0	0
Boavista	2021–22	Primeira Liga	0	0	0	0	—		0	0	0	0
Boavista	2022–23	Primeira Liga	1	0	1	0	—		2 (Note: Appearances in Taça da Liga)	0	4	0
Boavista	2023–24	Primeira Liga	34	0	2	0	—		1	0	37	0
Boavista	2024–25	Primeira Liga	4	0	0	0	—		0	0	4	0
Boavista	Total		39	0	3	0	—		3	0	45	0
Boavista U23	2020–21	Liga Revelação	19	0	—		—		—		19	0
AVS	2025–26	Primeira Liga	6	0	2	0	—		0	0	8	0
Universitatea Craiova	2025–26	Liga I	0	0	0	0	—		—		0	1
Nacional	2026–27	Primeira Liga	0	0	0	0	—		—		0	1
Career total			66	0	5	0	—		3	0	74	0

== Honours ==
Universitatea Craiova

- Liga I: 2025–26
- Cupa României: 2025–26
