= Martim Tavares =

Portuguese footballer

Personal information
- Full name: Martim Miguel Carneiro Tavares
- Date of birth: 10 November 2003 (age 23)
- Place of birth: Porto, Portugal
- Height: 1.83 m (6 ft 0 in)
- Position: Forward

Team information
- Current team: Académica de Coimbra
- Number: 9

Youth career
- 2011–2021: Porto
- 2018–2019: → Padroense (loan)
- 2021–2022: Boavista

Senior career*
Years	Team	Apps	(Gls)
2022–2024	Boavista	44	(3)
2024–2026	Marítimo	37	(7)
2026	→ Racing de Ferrol (loan)	6	(1)
2026–	Académica de Coimbra	4	(0)

International career^{‡}
2022–2023	Portugal U20	4	(0)
- * Club domestic league appearances and goals as of 11 September 2026 ‡ National team caps and goals as of 28 March 2023

Martim Miguel Carneiro Tavares (born 10 November 2003) is a Portuguese professional footballer who plays as a forward for Liga Portugal 2 club Académica de Coimbra.

== Club career ==
Born in Porto, Tavares played as a youth for FC Porto, as well as having a loan to farm team Padroense F.C. in 2018–19. On 26 July 2021, after having scored 72 goals in 94 games over the last four seasons, he moved across the city to Boavista F.C. as a member of the under-19 team and also taking part with the first team.

On 14 August 2022, Tavares made his debut in the Primeira Liga as a 64th-minute substitute for Filipe Ferreira at home to C.D. Santa Clara. Within two minutes, he scored the winning goal in a 2–1 victory.

On 3 July 2024, Tavares signed with Liga Portugal 2 club Marítimo.
