= Breno Teixeira (footballer, born 2000) =

Portuguesefootballer

Personal information
- Full name: Breno Pais Teixeira
- Date of birth: 1 January 2000 (age 26)
- Place of birth: Paredes, Portugal
- Height: 1.79 m (5 ft 10 in)
- Position: Left-back

Team information
- Current team: Fafe
- Number: 15

Youth career
- 2009–2012: Paredes
- 2012–2017: Penafiel
- 2017: Braga
- 2017–2018: Famalicão
- 2018–2021: Boavista

Senior career*
Years	Team	Apps	(Gls)
2021	Boavista	0	(0)
2021	→ Águeda (loan)	10	(0)
2021–2023	Paredes	42	(1)
2023–2024	Anadia	24	(3)
2024–2025	Lusitânia	27	(0)
2025–	Fafe	15	(1)
- * Club domestic league appearances and goals as of 13 September 2026

Breno Pais Teixeira (born 1 January 2000), sometimes known as just Breno, is a Portuguese professional footballer who plays as a left-back for Liga 3 club Fafe.

== Playing career ==
Breno is a youth product of the academies of Paredes, Penafiel, Braga, Famalicão and Boavista. He began his senior career with the reserves of Boavista, before joining Águeda on loan for the second half of the 2020–21 season. Teixeira made his professional debut with Boavista in a 1–0 Taça da Liga win over Marítimo on 25 July 2021.
