= Tomás Reymão =

Portuguese footballer

Personal information
- Full name: Tomás Mascarenhas Lemos Reymão Nogueira
- Date of birth: 14 July 1998 (age 28)
- Place of birth: Lisbon, Portugal
- Height: 1.88 m (6 ft 2 in)
- Position: Midfielder

Youth career
- 2007–2008: Carcavelos
- 2008–2010: Sporting CP
- 2010–2012: Chelsea
- 2012–2013: Sporting CP
- 2013–2015: Estoril
- 2015–2016: Oeiras
- 2016–2017: Fiorentina
- 2018: Wolverhampton Wanderers
- 2018–2019: Belenenses SAD

Senior career*
Years	Team	Apps	(Gls)
2019	Boavista B	1	(0)
2019–2022	Boavista	13	(0)
2022–2023	Albacete	0	(0)
2023–2024	Leixões	1	(0)
- * Club domestic league appearances and goals as of 29 June 2024

Tomás Mascarenhas Lemos Reymão Nogueira (born 14 July 1998) is a Portuguese professional footballer who plays as a midfielder. As a youth player, he spent time at clubs such as Sporting CP, Chelsea, Wolverhampton Wanderers and Fiorentina.

== Club career ==
Reymão made his professional debut with Boavista F.C. in a 1-0 Primeira Liga loss to C.S. Marítimo on 8 July 2020. In the axadrezada team, despite his youth and the change of coaches, he has been consolidating his position in the squad, now in Petit's options.

On 23 July 2022, Reymão moved abroad and joined Spanish Segunda División side Albacete Balompié on a one-year contract. The following 31 January, after just one cup match, he terminated his contract.

On 16 October 2023, Reymão signed for Liga Portugal 2 club Leixões.
