= Ilija Vukotić =

Montenegrin footballer

Personal information
- Date of birth: 7 January 1999 (age 27)
- Place of birth: Cetinje, Montenegro, FR Yugoslavia
- Height: 1.91 m (6 ft 3 in)
- Position: Midfielder

Team information
- Current team: OFI
- Number: 8

Youth career
- 2014–2015: Lovćen
- 2015–2017: Grbalj
- 2017: Vitória Setúbal
- 2017–2018: Benfica

Senior career*
Years	Team	Apps	(Gls)
2015–2017	Grbalj	15	(1)
2017–2022	Benfica B	52	(4)
2021–2022	→ Boavista (loan)	20	(0)
2022–2025	Boavista	67	(4)
2025–	OFI	12	(0)

International career^{‡}
2014–2016	Montenegro U17	13	(3)
2015	Montenegro U18	2	(0)
2015–2018	Montenegro U19	14	(2)
2017–2020	Montenegro U21	16	(6)
2021–2022	Montenegro	3	(1)
- * Club domestic league appearances and goals as of 14 June 2026 ‡ National team caps and goals as of 1 June 2023

Ilija Vukotić (born 7 January 1999) is a Montenegrin professional footballer who plays as a midfielder for Greek Super League club OFI.

== Club career ==
Vukotić began his competitive football career at the age of 12. On 21 March 2015, he scored against Berane in his debut for Grbalj, becoming the youngest goalscorer in the history of the Montenegrin First League aged 16 years, 73 days.

In the summer of 2017, Vukotić moved to Portugal, joining Benfica's youth setup.

On 17 August 2021, Vukotić signed a new contract with Benfica and was immediately loaned to Primeira Liga club Boavista for two seasons. In the summer of 2022, Vukotić permanently joined Boavista as part of the deal that sent Petar Musa to Benfica. Benfica retained 50% of Vukotić's economic rights and a buy-back option.

== International career ==
He debuted for Montenegro on 13 November 2021 in a 2022 FIFA World Cup qualification match against the Netherlands. He came on as a substitute in the 69th minute, with Montenegro trailing 2–0, and scored in the 82nd minute to bring the score to 2–1, contributing to the eventual 2–2 final result.

== Career statistics ==
=== Club ===
As of match played 16 February 2019

Appearances and goals by club, season and competition
Club	Season	League			National cup		League cup		Total	
Club	Season	Division	Apps	Goals	Apps	Goals	Apps	Goals	Apps	Goals
Grbalj	2014–15	Montenegrin First League	2	1	0	0	—		2	1
Grbalj	2015–16	Montenegrin First League	5	0	0	0	—		5	0
Grbalj	2016–17	Montenegrin First League	8	0	3	0	—		11	0
Grbalj	Total		15	1	3	0	—		18	1
Benfica B	2017–18	LigaPro	1	0	—		—		1	0
Benfica B	2018–19	LigaPro	7	0	—		—		7	0
Benfica B	2019–20	LigaPro	18	0	—		—		18	0
Benfica B	2020–21	Liga Portugal 2	24	3	—		—		24	3
Benfica B	2021–22	Liga Portugal 2	2	1	—		—		2	1
Benfica B	Total		52	4	—		—		52	4
Boavista (loan)	2021–22	Primeira Liga	20	0	1	0	2	0	23	0
Boavista	2022–23	Primeira Liga	13	0	1	0	0	0	14	0
Boavista	2023–24	Primeira Liga	8	1	1	0	1	0	10	1
Boavista	Total		41	1	3	0	3	0	47	1
Career total			108	6	6	0	3	0	117	6

=== International ===
As of match played 7 June 2022

Appearances and goals by national team and year
National team	Year	Apps	Goals
Montenegro	2021	2	1
Montenegro	2022	1	0
Total		3	1

As of match played 7 June 2022
Scores and results list Montenegro goal tally first, score column indicates score after each Vukotić goal.

List of international goals scored by Ilija Vukotić
No.	Date	Venue	Cap	Opponent	Score	Result	Competition
1	13 November 2021	Podgorica City Stadium, Podgorica, Montenegro	1	Netherlands	1–2	2–2	2022 FIFA World Cup qualification

== Honours ==
OFI

- Greek Cup: 2025–26
