= Fran Pereira =

Portuguese footballer (born 2002)

Personal information
- Full name: Francisco João Rodrigues Baptista Monteiro Pereira
- Date of birth: 6 February 2002 (age 24)
- Place of birth: Vila Nova de Gaia, Portugal
- Height: 1.85 m (6 ft 1 in)
- Position: Midfielder

Team information
- Current team: Sintrense
- Number: 18

Youth career
- 2011–2012: Panther Force
- 2012–2013: Torrão
- 2013–2014: Salgueiros
- 2014–2016: Arcozelo
- 2016–2021: Boavista

Senior career*
Years	Team	Apps	(Gls)
2021–2022	Boavista	1	(0)
2022–2026	Estoril Praia	1	(0)
2024–2026	→ Académica de Coimbra (loan)	26	(1)
2026	→ Lusitano de Évora (loan)	10	(0)
2026–	Sintrense	4	(0)
- * Club domestic league appearances and goals as of 13 September 2026

Francisco João Rodrigues Baptista Monteiro Pereira (born 6 February 2002), known as just Fran Pereira, is a Portuguese professional footballer who plays as a midfielder for Campeonato de Portugal club Sintrense.

== Career ==
Fran is a product of the youth academies of Panther Force, Torrão, Salgueiros, Arcozelo and Boavista. On 22 January 2020, he signed his first professional contract with Boavista. He made his professional debut with Boavista in a 1–0 Taça da Liga win over Marítimo on 25 July 2021.

On 24 January 2026 he joined Lusitano de Évora on loan.
