= Jeriel De Santis =

Venezuelan footballer (born 2002)

Personal information
- Full name: Jeriel Nicolás De Santis Córdova
- Date of birth: 18 June 2002 (age 24)
- Place of birth: El Callao, Venezuela
- Height: 1.92 m (6 ft 4 in)
- Position: Forward

Team information
- Current team: Caracas

Senior career*
Years	Team	Apps	(Gls)
2019–2020	Caracas	7	(0)
2020–2024	Boavista	31	(2)
2022–2023	→ Cartagena B (loan)	20	(11)
2024–2025	Alianza Lima	8	(0)
2024	→ Intercity (loan)	11	(1)
2025	→ Caracas (loan)	6	(2)
2025-	Caracas	22	(7)
2026	→ FBC Melgar	6	(1)

International career^{‡}
2019	Venezuela U17	3	(3)
2022	Venezuela U20	4	(0)
2022	Venezuela U21	4	(0)
2023	Venezuela U23	2	(0)
- * Club domestic league appearances and goals as of 19:09, 29 October 2023 (UTC) ‡ National team caps and goals as of 19:09, 29 October 2023 (UTC)

Jeriel Nicolás De Santis Córdova (born 18 June 2002) is a Venezuelan professional footballer who plays as a forward for club Caracas.

== Club career ==
In July 2024, De Santis returned to Spain, joining Primera Federación – Group 2 club Intercity on a season-long loan deal.

== International career ==
In June 2023, he took part in the Maurice Revello Tournament in France with Venezuela.

== Career statistics ==
As of 31 July 2024

Appearances and goals by club, season and competition
Club	Season	League			National cup		League cup		Total	
Club	Season	Division	Apps	Goals	Apps	Goals	Apps	Goals	Apps	Goals
Caracas	2019	Venezuelan Primera División	7	0	2	1	—		9	1
Boavista	2020–21	Primeira Liga	3	0	0	0	—		3	0
Boavista	2021–22	Primeira Liga	16	2	0	0	2	0	18	2
Boavista	2023–24	Primeira Liga	12	0	1	0	1	0	14	0
Boavista	Total		31	2	1	0	3	0	35	2
Cartagena B (loan)	2022–23	Segunda Federación	20	11	—		—		20	11
Alianza Lima	2024	Peruvian Primera División	8	0	0	0	—		8	0
Career total			67	13	3	1	3	0	71	14
