= 2018 Tokushima Vortis season =

Tokushima Vortis
2018 season
- Manager: Ricardo Rodríguez
- Stadium: Pocarisweat Stadium
- J2 League: 11th
- 2018 Emperor's Cup: 3rd Round
Home colours	Away colours

2018 Tokushima Vortis season.

== J2 League ==
Match	Date	Team	Score	Team	Venue	Attendance
1	2018.02.25	Tokushima Vortis	0-1	Fagiano Okayama	Pocarisweat Stadium	8,753
2	2018.03.04	Roasso Kumamoto	2-1	Tokushima Vortis	Egao Kenko Stadium	5,197
3	2018.03.10	Omiya Ardija	0-1	Tokushima Vortis	NACK5 Stadium Omiya	6,989
4	2018.03.17	Tokushima Vortis	4-1	JEF United Chiba	Pocarisweat Stadium	5,074
5	2018.03.21	Ventforet Kofu	0-1	Tokushima Vortis	Yamanashi Chuo Bank Stadium	3,130
6	2018.03.25	Albirex Niigata	1-0	Tokushima Vortis	Denka Big Swan Stadium	13,576
7	2018.04.01	Tokushima Vortis	0-4	Tokyo Verdy	Pocarisweat Stadium	5,303
8	2018.04.08	Tochigi SC	1-1	Tokushima Vortis	Tochigi Green Stadium	4,087
9	2018.04.15	FC Gifu	0-0	Tokushima Vortis	Gifu Nagaragawa Stadium	7,217
10	2018.04.22	Tokushima Vortis	0-1	Kamatamare Sanuki	Pocarisweat Stadium	6,017
11	2018.04.28	Yokohama FC	1-0	Tokushima Vortis	NHK Spring Mitsuzawa Football Stadium	3,993
12	2018.05.03	Tokushima Vortis	2-0	Ehime FC	Pocarisweat Stadium	6,756
13	2018.05.06	Mito HollyHock	0-1	Tokushima Vortis	K's denki Stadium Mito	3,605
14	2018.05.12	Tokushima Vortis	1-0	Kyoto Sanga FC	Pocarisweat Stadium	4,713
15	2018.05.20	Zweigen Kanazawa	0-0	Tokushima Vortis	Ishikawa Athletics Stadium	4,004
16	2018.05.26	Tokushima Vortis	1-1	Matsumoto Yamaga FC	Pocarisweat Stadium	5,312
17	2018.06.02	Avispa Fukuoka	1-0	Tokushima Vortis	Level5 Stadium	8,598
18	2018.06.10	Tokushima Vortis	1-2	FC Machida Zelvia	Pocarisweat Stadium	3,615
19	2018.06.16	Tokushima Vortis	1-2	Renofa Yamaguchi FC	Pocarisweat Stadium	4,828
20	2018.06.23	Montedio Yamagata	3-2	Tokushima Vortis	ND Soft Stadium Yamagata	6,012
21	2018.06.30	Tokushima Vortis	3-0	Oita Trinita	Pocarisweat Stadium	4,491
22	2018.07.07	Tokushima Vortis	1-0	Roasso Kumamoto	Pocarisweat Stadium	2,974
23	2018.07.15	Ehime FC	1-0	Tokushima Vortis	Ningineer Stadium	5,319
24	2018.07.21	Tokushima Vortis	2-1	Omiya Ardija	Pocarisweat Stadium	5,801
25	2018.07.25	Tokushima Vortis	3-1	Avispa Fukuoka	Pocarisweat Stadium	3,787
27	2018.08.04	Tokushima Vortis	1-0	Mito HollyHock	Pocarisweat Stadium	4,457
28	2018.08.12	Renofa Yamaguchi FC	2-2	Tokushima Vortis	Ishin Me-Life Stadium	7,354
29	2018.08.18	Tokushima Vortis	5-1	Montedio Yamagata	Pocarisweat Stadium	4,673
26	2018.08.22	Fagiano Okayama	2-1	Tokushima Vortis	City Light Stadium	5,034
30	2018.08.25	Oita Trinita	0-1	Tokushima Vortis	Oita Bank Dome	8,738
31	2018.09.01	Kamatamare Sanuki	0-4	Tokushima Vortis	Pikara Stadium	4,446
32	2018.09.08	Tokushima Vortis	4-1	Tochigi SC	Pocarisweat Stadium	3,917
33	2018.09.15	Tokushima Vortis	2-1	FC Gifu	Pocarisweat Stadium	4,773
34	2018.09.22	FC Machida Zelvia	1-1	Tokushima Vortis	Machida Stadium	3,524
36	2018.10.07	Tokushima Vortis	0-3	Zweigen Kanazawa	Pocarisweat Stadium	4,897
37	2018.10.13	Kyoto Sanga FC	1-0	Tokushima Vortis	Kyoto Nishikyogoku Athletic Stadium	5,930
35	2018.10.16	Tokushima Vortis	0-1	Ventforet Kofu	Pocarisweat Stadium	3,217
38	2018.10.21	Tokyo Verdy	2-1	Tokushima Vortis	Ajinomoto Stadium	5,873
39	2018.10.28	Tokushima Vortis	0-1	Yokohama FC	Pocarisweat Stadium	5,848
40	2018.11.04	JEF United Chiba	2-0	Tokushima Vortis	Fukuda Denshi Arena	7,202
41	2018.11.11	Tokushima Vortis	0-0	Albirex Niigata	Pocarisweat Stadium	5,735
42	2018.11.17	Matsumoto Yamaga FC	0-0	Tokushima Vortis	Sunpro Alwin	19,066
