= Miguel Cid =

Portuguese footballer (born 1992)

Personal information
- Full name: Miguel José Ferreira Andrade Cid
- Date of birth: 21 May 1992 (age 34)
- Place of birth: Porto, Portugal
- Height: 1.75 m (5 ft 9 in)
- Position: Midfielder

Youth career
- 2002–2005: Boavista
- 2005–2006: Pasteleira
- 2006–2007: Boavista
- 2007–2008: Pasteleira
- 2008–2009: Benfica
- 2009–2010: Boavista
- 2010–2011: Gondomar

Senior career*
Years	Team	Apps	(Gls)
2011–2012	SC Coimbrões	13	(0)
2012–2015	Boavista	39	(0)
2015	→ BFC Daugavpils (loan)	10	(1)
2015–2016	Kemi Kings	7	(0)
2016	BFC Daugavpils	9	(0)
2016	Gondomar	2	(0)
2016–2017	SC Coimbrões	13	(1)
2017–2019	Boavista B	33	(2)
- * Club domestic league appearances and goals as of 23 December 2018

Miguel José Ferreira Andrade Cid (born 21 May 1992) is a Portuguese footballer who plays as a midfielder.

== Football career ==
On 17 August 2014, Cid made his professional debut with Boavista in a 2014–15 Primeira Liga match against Braga.
