= Luís Santos (footballer) =

Portuguese footballer

Personal information
- Full name: Luís Miguel Castelo Santos
- Date of birth: 20 January 2000 (age 26)
- Place of birth: Entroncamento, Portugal
- Height: 1.75 m (5 ft 9 in)
- Position: Winger

Team information
- Current team: Omonia 29M

Youth career
- 2008–2010: CADE
- 2010–2014: Sporting
- 2014–2015: Leiria
- 2015–2016: Tomar
- 2016–2020: Boavista

Senior career*
Years	Team	Apps	(Gls)
2020–2024	Boavista	45	(1)
2021	→ Trofense (loan)	14	(3)
2024–2025	Košice	19	(0)
2025–2026	Feirense	18	(2)
2026–	Omonia 29M	5	(1)
- * Club domestic league appearances and goals as of 2 November 2026

Luís Miguel Castelo Santos (born 20 January 2000) is a Portuguese professional footballer who plays as a winger for Cypriot First Division club Omonia 29M.

== Club career ==
Santos is a youth product of CADE, Sporting CP, Leiria, Tomar and Boavista.

Santos was promoted to the senior team of Boavista for the beginning of the 2021–22 season. He made his debut for the club in a 3–1 Primeira Liga loss to Benfica on 4 July 2020.

Santos joined Trofense on loan in February 2021 for the second half of the Campeonato de Portugal, where he contributed with 3 goals in 14 appearances, helping the Trofa-based side win the division's title and achieve promotion to the Liga Portugal 2.

Back from his loan, Santos scored his first goal for Boavista on 25 July 2021, in a 1–0 away victory over Marítimo in the first round of the Taça da Liga. On 27 February 2022, he scored his first Primeira Liga goal, the winner in a 3–2 victory away at Estoril Praia.

In July 2024, after his contract with Boavista expired, Santos moved to Slovakia, joining First Football League club Košice.

On 11 December 2025, following four months as a free agent, Santos returned to his homeland, joining Liga Portugal 2 side Feirense.

== Career statistics ==
As of match played 22 October 2023

Appearances and goals by club, season and competition
Club	Season	League			National cup		League cup		Total	
Club	Season	Division	Apps	Goals	Apps	Goals	Apps	Goals	Apps	Goals
Boavista	2019–20	Primeira Liga	3	0	0	0	0	0	3	0
Boavista	2021–22	Primeira Liga	14	1	0	0	3	1	17	2
Boavista	2022–23	Primeira Liga	9	0	0	0	3	0	12	0
Boavista	2023–24	Primeira Liga	4	0	1	0	0	0	5	0
Boavista	Total		30	1	1	0	6	1	37	2
Trofense (loan)	2020–21	Campeonato de Portugal	14	3	0	0	—		14	3
Career total			44	4	1	0	6	1	51	5

== Honours ==
Trofense

- Campeonato de Portugal: 2020–21
