= Joel Silva (footballer, born 2003) =

Portuguese footballer (born 2003)

Personal information
- Full name: Joel Filipe Organista da Silva
- Date of birth: 11 February 2003 (age 23)
- Place of birth: Vila Nova de Gaia, Portugal
- Height: 1.85 m (6 ft 1 in)
- Position: Midfielder

Team information
- Current team: Nacional
- Number: 26

Youth career
- 2011–2016: Porto
- 2016–2018: Dragon Force
- 2018–2019: Padroense
- 2019–2022: Boavista

Senior career*
| Years | Team | Apps | (Gls) |
| 2022–2025 | Boavista | 51 | (3) |
| 2025– | Nacional | 18 | (0) |
- * Club domestic league appearances and goals as of 25 May 2026

Joel Filipe Organista da Silva (born 11 February 2003) is a Portuguese professional footballer who plays as a midfielder for Primeira Liga club Nacional.

== Club career ==
=== Boavista ===
Silva is a youth product of Porto, Dragon Force, Padroense and Boavista. He was promoted to Boavista's senior team in July 2022.

Silva made his senior and professional debut with Boavista as a late substitute in a 3–0 Primeira Liga loss to Benfica on 27 August 2022.

On 30 November 2022, he signed a professional contract with Boavista, keeping him at the club until 2026.

=== Nacional ===
On 30 July 2025, Silva signed a four season contract with Nacional ahead of the 2025–26 season.

== Career statistics ==
As of match played 30 September 2023

Appearances and goals by club, season and competition
| Club | Season | League | | | National cup | | League cup | | Total | |
| Club | Season | Division | Apps | Goals | Apps | Goals | Apps | Goals | Apps | Goals |
|---|---|---|---|---|---|---|---|---|---|---|
| Boavista | 2022–23 | Primeira Liga | 7 | 0 | 0 | 0 | 3 | 0 | 10 | 0 |
| Boavista | 2023–24 | Primeira Liga | 2 | 0 | 0 | 0 | 0 | 0 | 2 | 0 |
| Boavista | Total | | 9 | 0 | 0 | 0 | 3 | 0 | 12 | 0 |
| Career total | | | 9 | 0 | 0 | 0 | 3 | 0 | 12 | 0 |
