= Filipe Ferreira (footballer, born 1990) =

Portuguese footballer

Personal information
- Full name: Filipe Miguel Neves Ferreira
- Date of birth: 27 September 1990 (age 36)
- Place of birth: Lisbon, Portugal
- Height: 1.78 m (5 ft 10 in)
- Positions: Left-back; midfielder

Youth career
- 2002–2003: Sporting CP
- 2003–2007: CAC Pontinha
- 2007–2009: Atlético

Senior career*
Years	Team	Apps	(Gls)
2008–2012	Atlético	60	(6)
2012–2016	Belenenses	91	(5)
2016–2018	Paços Ferreira	36	(0)
2018–2019	Sturm Graz	3	(0)
2019	→ Nacional (loan)	5	(0)
2019–2021	Tondela	61	(1)
2021–2025	Boavista	84	(0)

International career
2011	Portugal U21	2	(0)
- * Club domestic league appearances and goals as of 18:37, 18 May 2025 (UTC)

Filipe Miguel Neves Ferreira (born 27 September 1990) is a Portuguese professional footballer who plays mainly as a left-back.

He made 263 appearances in the Primeira Liga, mostly for Belenenses but also Nacional, Tondela and Boavista. Additionally, he had a brief spell in the Austrian Bundesliga with Sturm Graz.

== Club career ==
Born in Lisbon, Ferreira began his senior career at hometown club Atlético Clube de Portugal in the third division, winning promotion in 2010–11 and making his professional debut in the Segunda Liga the following season. A year later, he moved across the league and the capital city to C.F. Os Belenenses, playing 19 matches in all competitions as the team won the league title; he subsequently extended his contract from 2014 to the following year.

Ferreira featured regularly in his debut campaign in the Primeira Liga, and scored the winner in a 2–1 home victory over S.C. Braga on 2 February 2014 that ended a nine-game winless run. In July 2016, once his contract expired, he signed a two-year deal at F.C. Paços de Ferreira in the same competition.

In July 2018, Ferreira moved abroad for the first time, signing for SK Sturm Graz of the Austrian Football Bundesliga. Having made only six appearances in all tournaments, he returned the following January to his own country's top flight by joining C.D. Nacional on loan until 30 June; his registration at the Madeiran club was delayed for bureaucratic reasons.

Following Nacional's relegation, in July 2019 Ferreira made a permanent move back to the top tier on a two-year contract at C.D. Tondela. On 12 July 2021, he signed with Boavista F.C. for one season.

== International career ==
Ferreira played twice for the Portugal under-21 side, in March 2011 friendlies. He earned his first cap against the Republic of Ireland (2–0 win), and his second three days later against Denmark (1–1).

== Personal life ==
Ferreira's father, José Carlos, was also a footballer and a defender.

== Career statistics ==
As of match played 18 May 2024

Appearances and goals by club, season and competition
Club	Season	League			National cup		League cup		Continental		Total	
Club	Season	Division	Apps	Goals	Apps	Goals	Apps	Goals	Apps	Goals	Apps	Goals
Atlético	2008–09	Segunda Divisão	3	1	0	0	—		—		3	1
Atlético	2009–10	Segunda Divisão	10	0	0	0	—		—		10	0
Atlético	2010–11	Segunda Divisão	31	4	1	0	—		—		32	4
Atlético	2011–12	Liga de Honra	16	1	1	0	1	0	—		18	1
Atlético	Total		60	6	2	0	1	0	—		63	6
Belenenses	2012–13	Segunda Liga	14	1	2	0	3	0	—		19	1
Belenenses	2013–14	Primeira Liga	28	1	1	0	3	0	—		32	1
Belenenses	2014–15	Primeira Liga	24	0	1	0	2	0	—		27	0
Belenenses	2015–16	Primeira Liga	25	3	2	0	2	0	5 (Note: Appearances in UEFA Europa League)	0	34	3
Belenenses	Total		91	5	6	0	10	0	5	0	112	5
Paços Ferreira	2016–17	Primeira Liga	23	0	1	0	1	0	—		25	0
Paços Ferreira	2017–18	Primeira Liga	13	0	0	0	1	0	—		14	0
Paços Ferreira	Total		36	0	1	0	2	0	—		39	0
Sturm Graz	2018–19	Austrian Football Bundesliga	3	0	1	0	—		2 (Note: Appearances in UEFA Champions League)	0	6	0
Nacional (loan)	2018–19	Primeira Liga	5	0	0	0	0	0	—		5	0
Tondela	2019–20	Primeira Liga	29	0	1	0	0	0	—		30	0
Tondela	2020–21	Primeira Liga	32	1	2	0	—		—		34	1
Tondela	Total		61	1	3	0	0	0	—		64	1
Boavista	2021–22	Primeira Liga	24	0	0	0	3	0	—		27	0
Boavista	2022–23	Primeira Liga	7	0	0	0	0	0	—		7	0
Boavista	2023–24	Primeira Liga	26	0	2	0	1	0	—		29	0
Boavista	Total		57	0	2	0	4	0	—		63	0
Career total			313	12	15	0	17	0	7	0	352	12

== Honours ==
Belenenses

- Segunda Liga: 2012–13
