= Ricardo Paiva =

Portuguese football manager (born 1980)

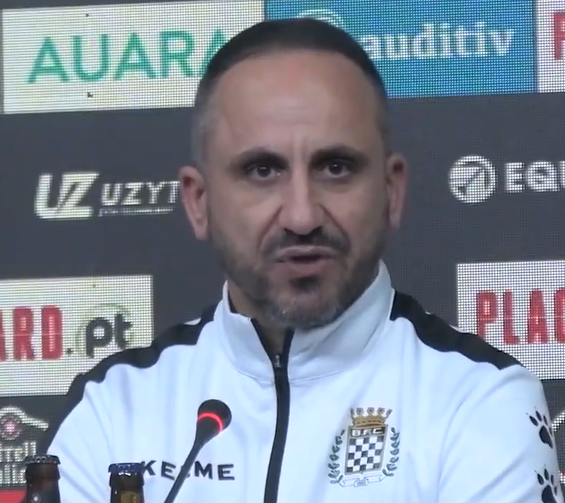
- Paiva with Boavista in 2024

Personal information
- Full name: Ricardo Filipe Correia de Paiva
- Date of birth: 24 May 1980 (age 46)
- Place of birth: Matosinhos, Portugal

Team information
- Current team: Boavista (assistant)

Managerial career
- Years: Team
- 2016–2020: Boavista (youth)
- 2021–2023: Boavista (youth)
- 2023–2024: Boavista
- 2024–: Boavista (assistant)

Ricardo Filipe Correia de Paiva (born 24 May 1980) is a Portuguese football manager. He was most recently in charge of Primeira Liga club Boavista. Before becoming the first team manager of Boavista, he worked in the club as an analyst and youth coach.

== Coaching career ==
Born in Matosinhos, Porto, Paiva worked as a match analyst for Sérgio Conceição's staff at SC Olhanense, Académica de Coimbra, SC Braga and Vitória SC. In 2016, he moved to Boavista FC, being named manager of the under-19 team.

Paiva became a youth coordinator of Boavista in 2017, leaving managerial role in 2020 but returning on 2 November 2021. On 16 December 2023, he and Jorge Couto became caretaker managers of the first team after the resignation of Petit, with Couto being formally the manager after possessing the necessary coaching licenses.

On 29 December 2023, Boavista confirmed Paiva as first team manager until the end of the season. On his debut the following day, his side lost 1–0 to Gil Vicente. He left the position on 16 April 2024, after a series of poor results.

== Managerial statistics ==
As of 16 April 2024

Managerial record by team and tenure
Team	Nat	From	To	Record								Ref
Team	Nat	From	To	G	W	D	L	GF	GA	GD	Win %	Ref
Boavista	(Portugal)	29 December 2023	16 April 2024	15	3	4	8	13	27	−14	20.00	
Total				15	3	4	8	13	27	−14	20.00	—
