= Augusto Dabó =

Bissau-Guinean footballer (born 2004)

Personal information
- Full name: Augusto Júlio Dabó
- Date of birth: 13 March 2004 (age 22)
- Place of birth: Bissau, Guinea-Bissau
- Height: 1.86 m (6 ft 1 in)
- Position: Left-back

Team information
- Current team: Gandzasar Kapan
- Number: 20

Youth career
- 2020–2022: Boavista

Senior career*
Years	Team	Apps	(Gls)
2022–2025	Boavista	16	(0)
2025–2026	Beroe	13	(0)
2026–	Gandzasar Kapan	2	(0)

International career^{‡}
2024–	Guinea-Bissau	1	(0)
- * Club domestic league appearances and goals as of 21 October 2026 ‡ National team caps and goals as of 19:54, 19 November 2024 (UTC)

Augusto Júlio Dabó (born 13 March 2004) is a Bissau-Guinean professional footballer who plays as a left-back for Armenian Premier League club Gandzasar Kapan and the Guinea-Bissau national team.

== Professional career ==
Born in Guinea-Bissau, Dabo moved to Portugal at a young age. He is a youth product of Boavista, and was part of their U19 team that won the second division national trophy for that category in the 2021–22 season. He was named to their senior team for the 2022–23 season in the Primeira Liga. He made his professional debut as a substitute for Boavista as a substitute in the 90+6th minute in a 1–0 Primeira Liga win over Portimonense on 7 August 2022, and had a goal called off in his appearance.

== International career ==
In November 2024, Dabó was called up to the Guinea-Bissau national team for a set of 2025 Africa Cup of Nations qualification matches.
