= Berna (footballer) =

Portuguese footballer (born 2003)

Personal information
- Full name: Bernardo Silva Conceição
- Date of birth: 15 September 2003 (age 23)
- Place of birth: Porto, Portugal
- Height: 1.69 m (5 ft 7 in)
- Positions: Left-back; winger; attacking midfielder

Team information
- Current team: Petro de Luanda

Youth career
- 2011–2013: FC Foz
- 2013–2015: Porto
- 2015–2022: Boavista

Senior career*
Years	Team	Apps	(Gls)
2022–2024	Boavista	19	(0)
2024–2026	Felgueiras	40	(0)
2026–	Petro de Luanda	0	(0)

International career^{‡}
2024–	Angola	4	(0)
Medal record
Men's football
Representing Angola
COSAFA Cup
Winner	2024 South Africa
- * Club domestic league appearances and goals as of 20 June 2026 ‡ National team caps and goals as of 8 February 2025

Bernardo Silva Conceição (born 15 September 2003), better known simply as Berna, is a professional footballer who plays as a left-back, winger or attacking midfielder for Petro de Luanda. Born in Portugal, he plays for the Angola national team.

== Professional career ==
Berna is a youth product of FC Foz, Porto and Boavista. On 8 May 2020, he signed his first senior contract with Boavista. On 25 May 2022, he extended his professional contract with Boavista for 2 more seasons. He made his senior and professional debut with Boavista as a substitute in a 3–2 Taça da Liga win over Belenenses on 18 November 2022. He joined the senior Boavista team for the preseason in the summer of 2023, and was promoted to their senior team in advance of the 2023–24 season.

On 24 July 2024, Berna joined recently promoted Liga Portugal 2 club Felgueiras.

== International career ==
Born in Portugal, Berna is of Portuguese and Angolan descent. In June 2024, he accepted a call-up to the Angola national football team.
