= Chidozie Awaziem =

Nigerian footballer (born 1997)

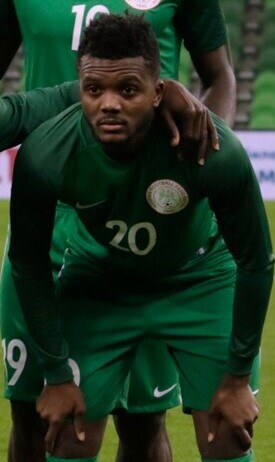
- Awaziem with Nigeria in 2017

Personal information
- Full name: Chidozie Collins Awaziem
- Date of birth: 1 January 1997 (age 29)
- Place of birth: Enugu, Nigeria
- Height: 1.92 m (6 ft 4 in)
- Position: Centre-back

Team information
- Current team: Konyaspor
- Number: 15

Youth career
- 2011–2014: El-Kanemi Warriors
- 2014–2015: Porto

Senior career*
Years	Team	Apps	(Gls)
2015–2019	Porto B	62	(2)
2016–2021	Porto	10	(0)
2017–2018	→ Nantes (loan)	22	(1)
2019	→ Çaykur Rizespor (loan)	16	(0)
2019–2020	→ Leganés (loan)	26	(0)
2020–2021	→ Boavista (loan)	27	(0)
2021–2024	Boavista	27	(0)
2021–2022	→ Alanyaspor (loan)	18	(1)
2022–2023	→ Hajduk Split (loan)	28	(5)
2024	FC Cincinnati	7	(0)
2025	Colorado Rapids	20	(0)
2025–2026	Nantes	27	(1)
2026–	Konyaspor	4	(0)

International career^{‡}
2017–	Nigeria	40	(2)
Medal record
Men's football
Representing Nigeria
Africa Cup of Nations
Runner-up	2023 Ivory Coast
Third place	2019 Egypt
Third place	2025 Morocco
- * Club domestic league appearances and goals as of 15:56, 8 October 2026 (UTC) ‡ National team caps and goals as of 18:41, 17 January 2026 (UTC)

Chidozie Collins Awaziem MON // (born 1 January 1997) is a Nigerian professional footballer who plays as a centre-back for Süper Lig club Konyaspor and the Nigeria national team.

== Club career ==
=== Porto ===
Born in Enugu, Awaziem joined FC Porto from Portugal in 2014, where he spent his last year as a junior and won the corresponding league title. His senior debut was made with the B team in the Segunda Liga.

On 27 January 2016, aged 19, Awaziem appeared in his first competitive game with the main squad, featuring the full 90 minutes in a 2–0 away loss against C.D. Feirense in the Taça da Liga. His maiden appearance in the Primeira Liga took place on 12 February, as he again started in a 2–1 win at S.L. Benfica due to an injury crisis to the defensive sector.

Awaziem was loaned to French club FC Nantes for the 2017–18 season. His first match in Ligue 1 took place on 6 August 2017, when he came on as a 74th-minute substitute in a 3–0 defeat away to Lille OSC.

In January 2019, Awaziem joined Çaykur Rizespor on loan until the end of the campaign. On 15 August, in the same situation, he moved to CD Leganés.

=== Boavista ===
Still owned by Porto, Awaziem signed a temporary deal with Boavista F.C. – also in Portugal and the city of Porto – ahead of 2020–21, with the obligation of a permanent four-year contract on 30 June 2021. He returned to the Turkish Süper Lig on 8 September that year, being loaned to Alanyaspor.

On 1 August 2022, Awaziem was loaned to HNK Hajduk Split with an option to make the move permanent at the end of the season. During his tenure, he scored a career-best five goals and also won the Croatian Football Cup.

=== FC Cincinnati ===
Awaziem joined Major League Soccer side FC Cincinnati on 25 July 2024, on a two-year contract with the possibility of an extension through 2027. He totalled 14 appearances during his spell at TQL Stadium, recording three assists.

=== Later career ===
On 9 December 2024, Awaziem signed a one-year deal with Colorado Rapids, extendable until the end of the 2027 season. He returned to Nantes in summer 2025, on a three-year contract.

Awaziem went back to the Turkish top division on 29 July 2026, joining Konyaspor for €1 million.

== International career ==
Aged 19, Awaziem was called up by Nigeria for friendlies against Mali and Luxembourg, on 27 and 31 May 2016. He made his senior debut on 1 June 2017, starting in a 3–0 win over Togo in Paris in another exhibition game.

Awaziem was included in Gernot Rohr's 23-man squad for the 2018 FIFA World Cup in Russia, being an unused player as the tournament ended in group stage exit. He was also picked for the 2019, 2021, 2023 and 2025 Africa Cup of Nations.

== Career statistics ==
=== Club ===
As of match played 17 May 2026

Appearances and goals by club, season and competition
Club	Season	League			National cup (Note: Appearances in Taça de Portugal, Copa del Rey, Turkish Cup, Croatian Football Cup and U.S. Open Cup)		League cup (Note: Appearances in Taça da Liga, Coupe de la Ligue and Leagues Cup)		Continental		Other (Note: Appearances in MLS Cup playoffs)		Total	
Club	Season	Division	Apps	Goals	Apps	Goals	Apps	Goals	Apps	Goals	Apps	Goals	Apps	Goals
Porto B	2015–16	LigaPro	24	2	—		—		—		—		24	2
Porto B	2016–17	LigaPro	35	0	—		—		—		—		35	0
Porto B	2018–19	LigaPro	3	0	—		—		—		—		3	0
Porto B	Total		62	2	—		—		—		—		62	2
Porto	2015–16	Primeira Liga	10	0	2	1	1	0	—		—		13	1
Porto	2018–19	Primeira Liga	0	0	0	0	1	0	1 (Note: Appearance in UEFA Champions League)	0	—		2	0
Porto	Total		10	0	2	1	2	0	1	0	—		15	1
Nantes (loan)	2017–18	Ligue 1	22	1	—		1	0	—		—		23	1
Çaykur Rizespor (loan)	2018–19	Süper Lig	16	0	0	0	—		—		—		16	0
Leganés (loan)	2019–20	La Liga	26	0	3	0	—		—		—		29	0
Boavista (loan)	2020–21	Primeira Liga	27	0	2	0	—		—		—		29	0
Boavista	2021–22	Primeira Liga	3	0	0	0	—		0	0	—		3	0
Boavista	2023–24	Primeira Liga	24	0	2	0	1	0	—		—		27	0
Boavista	Total		54	0	4	0	1	0	—		—		59	0
Alanyaspor (loan)	2021–22	Süper Lig	18	1	4	0	—		—		—		22	1
Hajduk Split (loan)	2022–23	Croatian Football League	28	5	4	0	—		4 (Note: Appearances in UEFA Europa Conference League)	0	—		36	5
FC Cincinnati	2024	Major League Soccer	7	0	—		—		—		7 (Note: Four appearances in Leagues Cup, three appearances in MLS Cup playoffs)	0	14	0
Colorado Rapids	2025	Major League Soccer	20	0	—		—		2 (Note: Appearances in CONCACAF Champions Cup)	0	—		22	0
Nantes	2025–26	Ligue 1	27	1	0	0	—		—		—		27	1
Career total			290	10	17	1	4	0	7	0	7	0	325	11

=== International ===
As of match played 17 January 2026

Appearances and goals by national team and year
National team	Year	Apps	Goals
Nigeria	2017	2 (Note: Awaziem also appeared in one match against Togo in 2017, however Nigeria made nine substitutions during this match, and therefore it is not recognised as an official match by FIFA.)	0
Nigeria	2018	3	1
Nigeria	2019	12	0
Nigeria	2020	2	0
Nigeria	2021	7	0
Nigeria	2022	2	0
Nigeria	2023	1	0
Nigeria	2024	4	0
Nigeria	2025	5	1
Nigeria	2026	2	0
Total		40	2

As of match played 16 December 2025
Scores and results list Nigeria's goal tally first, score column indicates score after each Awaziem goal.

List of international goals scored by Chidozie Awaziem
No.	Date	Venue	Opponent	Score	Result	Competition
1.	8 September 2018	Stade Linité, Victoria, Seychelles	Seychelles	2–0	3–0	2019 Africa Cup of Nations qualification
2.	16 December 2025	Cairo International Stadium, Cairo, Egypt	Egypt	1–1	1–2	Friendly

== Honours ==
Porto B

- LigaPro: 2015–16

Porto

- Supertaça Cândido de Oliveira: 2018

Hajduk

- Croatian Football Cup: 2022–23

Nigeria

- Africa Cup of Nations runner-up: 2023; third place: 2025

Orders

- Member of the Order of the Niger
