= Manuel Namora =

Portuguese footballer

Personal information
- Full name: Manuel Maria Melo Machado Cerejeira Namora
- Date of birth: 12 February 1998 (age 28)
- Place of birth: Porto, Portugal
- Height: 1.80 m (5 ft 11 in)
- Position: Forward

Team information
- Current team: Boavista
- Number: 17

Youth career
- 2007–2010: Porto
- 2010–2012: Boavista
- 2012–2017: Rio Ave

Senior career*
Years	Team	Apps	(Gls)
2017–2019	Braga B	6	(1)
2018	→ Gondomar (loan)	11	(3)
2019–2021	Rio Ave B	13	(3)
2021	Rio Ave	2	(0)
2021–	Boavista	10	(0)
2022–2023	→ Felgueiras 1932 (loan)	13	(2)
2023–2024	→ Leixões (loan)	1	(0)
2024	→ Vianense (loan)	5	(0)
- * Club domestic league appearances and goals as of 3 June 2025

Manuel Maria Melo Machado Cerejeira Namora (born 12 February 1998) is a Portuguese professional footballer who plays as a forward for Primeira Liga club Boavista.

== Club career ==
On 23 August 2017, Namora made his professional debut with Braga B in a 2017–18 LigaPro match against Penafiel.

On 3 September 2019 it was confirmed, that Namora had returned to Rio Ave. He was registered for the club's U23-squad.

On 15 January 2021, Namora made his Primeira Liga debut with Rio Ave in a 1–1 away draw to Sporting CP.

On 17 August 2021, he signed a three-year contract with Boavista.

On 15 July 2022, Boavista sent Namora on a season-long loan to Liga 3 side Felgueiras 1932.

On 8 August 2023, Boavista, again, sent Namora on a season-long loan, this time to Liga Portugal 2 side Leixões. On 30 January 2024, after he made just three appearances in all competitions for the Matosinhos-based side, Namora's loan was cancelled and he returned to Boavista. Subsequently, he joined Liga 3 club Vianense.

== Personal life ==
Namora is the identical twin of the footballer Nuno Namora.
