= Estádio do Bessa =

Football stadium in Porto, Portugal

Coordinates: 41°09′44″N 8°38′34″W

Estádio do Bessa Séc. XXI
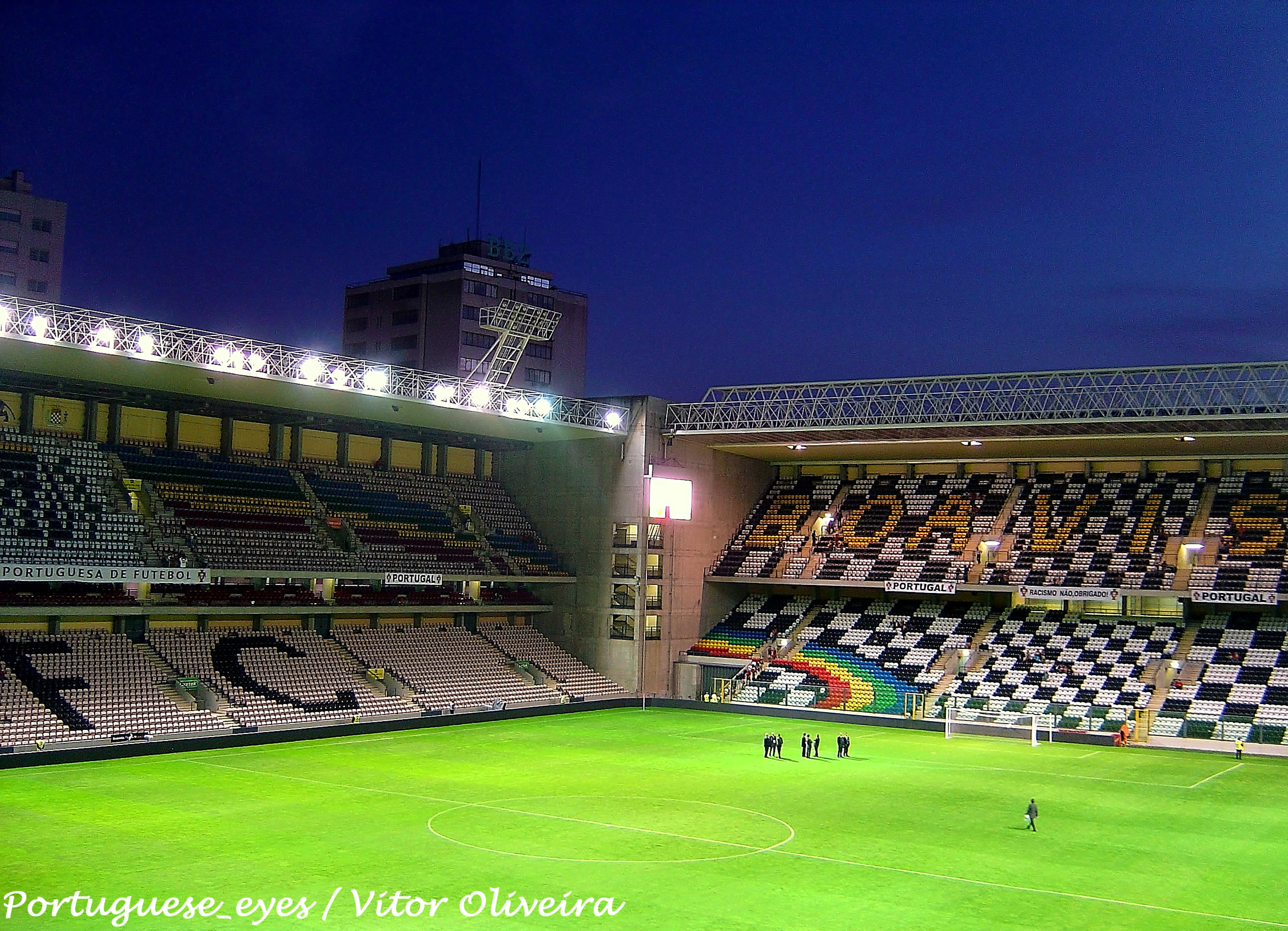
- UEFA
- Interactive map of Estádio do Bessa Séc. XXI
- Full name: Estádio do Bessa Séc. XXI
- Former names: Estádio do Bessa
- Location: Porto, Portugal
- Owner: Boavista
- Capacity: 28,263
- Surface: Grass
- Record attendance: 26,115 (22 June 2004); Denmark 2–2 Sweden
- Field size: 105 x 68 m
- Public transit: Francos

Construction
- Built: 1910; 116 years ago 2003; 23 years ago
- Opened: 1910, 30 December 2003
- Renovated: 1969–1972, 1999–2003
- Cost: €45,409 million
- Architects: Grupo 3 and Arquitectos Associados

Tenant
- Boavista (1910–2026)

The Estádio do Bessa Sec. XXI (English: Bessa Stadium Sec. XXI) is a football stadium located in the Boavista area of Porto, Portugal; it was the home ground of Boavista Futebol Clube.

Like other stadiums used in Euro 2004, the Bessa is a new ground but built on top of the old stands, with each new stand being constructed at different times, which allowed Boavista to continue playing there during the project. The former Campo do Bessa existed on the same place as the new stadium since 1910.

It cost €45,409 million to build, of which €7,792,281 was supported from the Portuguese state, and has an all-seater capacity of 28,263. Plans for improvement existed before the organization of the Euro 2004 was given to Portugal in 1999, and by then the first works were already underway. It was designed by Grupo3 Arquitectura.

The stadium was auctioned on April 27, 2026, in a process that was scheduled to close date on May 20. The base value was €31,068 million euros with the sporting complex was also auctioned for €6,7 million euros.

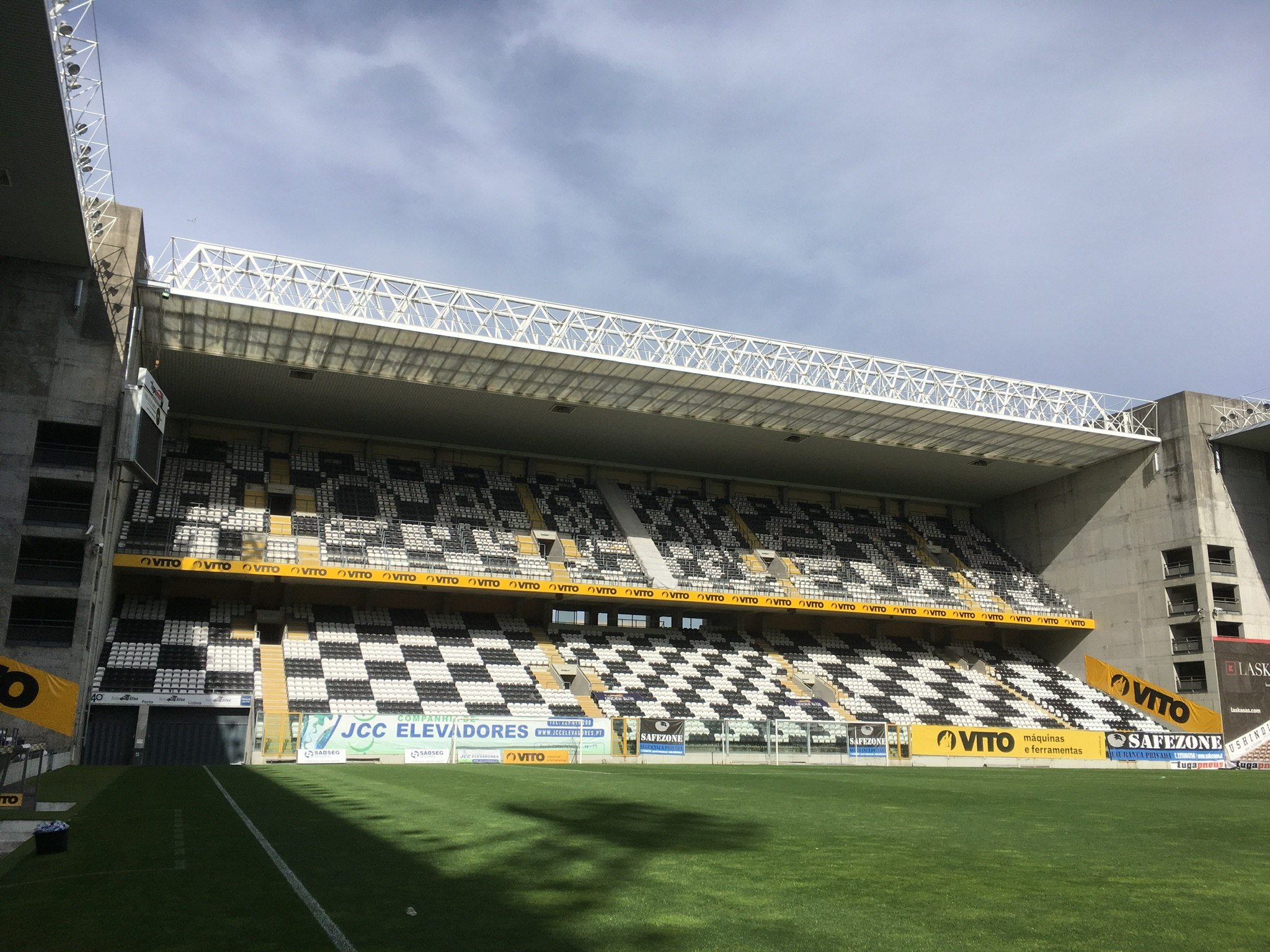
The Estadio do Bessa in 2018

== UEFA Euro 2004 ==
The following UEFA Euro 2004 matches were held in the stadium.

Date	Team #1	Result	Team #2	Round	Attendance
16 June 2004	Greece	1–1	Spain	Group A	25,444
19 June 2004	Latvia	0–0	Germany	Group D	22,344
22 June 2004	Denmark	2–2	Sweden	Group C	26,115

== Portugal national team matches ==
The following national team matches were held in the stadium.

#	Date	Score	Opponent	Competition
1.	16 November 1988	1–0	Luxembourg	World Cup 1990 qualification
2.	19 June 1993	4–0	Malta	World Cup 1994 qualification
3.	27 March 2002	1–4	Finland	Friendly
4.	7 October 2006	3–0	Azerbaijan	Euro 2008 qualifying
5.	1 September 2016	5–0	Gibraltar	Friendly
6.	31 August 2017	5–1	Faroe Islands	World Cup 2018 qualification

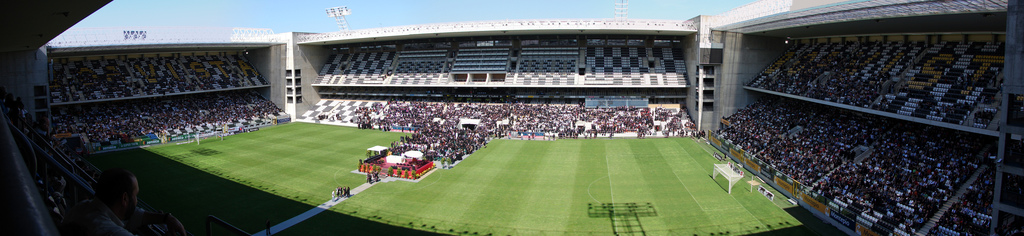
Panoramic view of the stadium interior.
