= Pedro Malheiro =

Portuguese footballer

Personal information
- Full name: Pedro Jorge Gonçalves Malheiro
- Date of birth: 21 January 2001 (age 25)
- Place of birth: Vila Verde, Portugal
- Height: 1.79 m (5 ft 10 in)
- Position: Right-back

Team information
- Current team: Al Wasl
- Number: 79

Youth career
- 2010–2011: Vilaverdense
- 2011–2014: Braga
- 2014–2015: Palmeiras FC
- 2015–2017: Famalicão
- 2017–2018: Vilaverdense
- 2018–2021: Boavista

Senior career*
Years	Team	Apps	(Gls)
2021–2024	Boavista	70	(2)
2021	→ Vilaverdense (loan)	4	(0)
2024–2025	Trabzonspor	30	(4)
2025–	Al Wasl	2	(1)

International career^{‡}
2022–2023	Portugal U21	4	(0)
- * Club domestic league appearances and goals as of 15 May 2025 ‡ National team caps and goals as of 14:56, 12 October 2023 (UTC)

Pedro Jorge Gonçalves Malheiro (born 21 January 2001) is a Portuguese professional footballer who plays as a right-back for Emirati UAE Pro League club Al Wasl.

== Playing career ==
Malheiro is a product of the youth academies of Vilaverdense, Braga, Palmeiras FC, and Boavista. On 22 January 2020, he signed his first professional contract with Boavista. He began his senior career with the reserves of Boavista, before moving to Vilaverdense on loan for the second half of the 2020–12 season. He made his professional debut with Boavista in a 1–0 Taça da Liga win over Marítimo on 25 July 2021.

On 23 July 2024, Malheiro signed with Trabzonspor in Turkey.
