= 2020–21 Boavista F.C. season =

Boavista F.C.
2020–21 season
- President: Vítor Murta
- Head coach: Daniel Ramos
- Stadium: Estádio do Bessa
- Primeira Liga: 13th
- Taça de Portugal: Fourth round
- Top goalscorer: League: Alberth Elis (7 goals); All: Alberth Elis (7 goals)
Home colours	Away colours	Third colours

The 2020–21 Boavista F.C. season was the club's 118th season in existence and the club's seventh consecutive season in the top flight of Portuguese football. In addition to the domestic league, Boavista participated in this season's edition of the Taça de Portugal, being eliminated in the fourth round. The club did not qualify for the condensed version of the Taça da Liga this season. The season covered the period from July 2020 to 30 June 2021.

== Players ==
=== First-team squad ===
As of 10 January 2021

Note: Flags indicate national team as defined under FIFA eligibility rules; some limited exceptions apply. Players may hold more than one non-FIFA nationality.

No.	Pos.	Nation	Player
1	GK	BRA	Rafael Bracalli
2	DF	USA	Reggie Cannon
3	DF	FRA	Adil Rami
4	DF	MEX	Alejandro Gómez (on loan from Atlas)
5	DF	NGR	Chidozie Awaziem (on loan from Porto)
6	MF	ESP	Javi García
7	MF	POR	Nuno Santos (on loan from Benfica)
8	MF	BRA	Gustavo Sauer
9	FW	HON	Jorge Benguché (on loan from Olimpia)
10	MF	ENG	Angel Gomes (on loan from Lille)
11	FW	GAM	Yusupha Njie
16	MF	POR	Miguel Reisinho
17	FW	HON	Alberth Elis

No.	Pos.	Nation	Player
19	DF	POR	Ricardo Mangas
20	GK	BRA	Léo Jardim (on loan from Lille)
21	DF	ECU	Jackson Porozo
22	DF	BRA	Nathan (on loan from Vasco da Gama)
23	MF	ANG	Show (on loan from Lille)
24	MF	COL	Sebastián Pérez (on loan from Boca Juniors)
25	DF	FRA	Yanis Hamache
27	FW	VEN	Jeriel De Santis
30	MF	BRA	Paulinho
42	DF	COL	Cristian Devenish (on loan from Atlético Nacional)
44	FW	NGR	Kuku Fidelis
73	FW	POR	Tiago Morais
99	GK	POR	João Gonçalves

== Transfers ==
=== In ===
Date	Pos	Player	Transferred from	Fee	Source
3 August 2020	DF	(France) Yanis Hamache	(France) Nice	Free	
4 August 2020	DF	(Portugal) Ricardo Mangas	(Portugal) Desportivo das Aves	Free	
10 August 2020	MF	(England) Angel Gomes	(France) Lille	Loan	
12 August 2020	MF	(Angola) Show	(France) Lille	Loan	
17 August 2020	MF	(Spain) Javi García	(Spain) Betis	Free	
17 August 2020	FW	(Honduras) Jorge Benguché	(Honduras) Olimpia	Loan	
18 August 2020	MF	(Portugal) Nuno Santos	(Portugal) Benfica	Loan	
27 August 2020	DF	(Mexico) Alejandro Gómez	(Mexico) Atlas	Loan	
29 August 2020	DF	(Ecuador) Jackson Porozo	(Brazil) Santos	Loan	
29 August 2020	MF	(Colombia) Sebastián Pérez	(Argentina) Boca Juniors	Loan	
1 September 2020	GK	(Brazil) Léo Jardim	(France) Lille	Loan	
4 September 2020	DF	(France) Adil Rami	(Russia) Sochi	Free	
5 September 2020	DF	(Nigeria) Chidozie Awaziem	(Portugal) Porto	Loan	
9 September 2020	DF	(United States) Reggie Cannon	(United States) FC Dallas	Undisclosed	
12 September 2020	DF	(Brazil) Nathan	(Brazil) Vasco da Gama	Loan	
21 September 2020	FW	(Honduras) Alberth Elis	(United States) Houston Dynamo	Undisclosed	

=== Out ===
Date	Pos	Player	Transferred to	Fee	Source
30 June 2020	DF	(Brazil) Neris	(United Arab Emirates) Al-Wasl	Free	
3 August 2020	DF	(Portugal) Edu Machado	(Portugal) Leixões	Free	
3 August 2020	MF	(Nigeria) Nwankwo Obiora		Released	
8 August 2020	GK	(Brazil) Helton Leite	(Portugal) Benfica	Undisclosed	
10 August 2020	MF	(Senegal) Idris	(Portugal) Covilhã	Released	
12 August 2020	FW	(Angola) Mateus	(Portugal) Penafiel	Free	
12 August 2020	DF	(Portugal) Carraça	(Portugal) Porto	Free	
13 August 2020	DF	(Portugal) Ricardo Costa	(Portugal) Boavista	Retired	
16 August 2020	MF	(Ghana) Yaw Ackah	(Turkey) Kayserispor	€600,000	
24 August 2020	FW	(Serbia) Nikola Stojiljković	(Portugal) Farense	Free	
6 September 2020	DF	(Brazil) Lucas Tagliapietra	(Portugal) Portimonense	Free	
7 September 2020	FW	(Brazil) Cassiano	(Portugal) Vizela	Free	

== Pre-season and friendlies ==
Win Draw Loss

== Competitions ==
=== Overview ===
Competition	First match	Last match	Starting round	Final position	Record							
Competition	First match	Last match	Starting round	Final position	Pld	W	D	L	GF	GA	GD	Win %
Primeira Liga	19 September 2020	19 May 2021	Matchday 1	13th	34	8	12	14	39	49	−10	23.53
Taça de Portugal	22 November 2020	12 December 2020	Third round	Fourth round	2	1	0	1	2	2	+0	50.00
Total					36	9	12	15	41	51	−10	25.00

Source: FBref

=== Primeira Liga ===
==== League table ====
Pos	Team	Pld	W	D	L	GF	GA	GD	Pts
11	Gil Vicente	34	11	6	17	33	42	−9	39
12	Tondela	34	10	6	18	36	57	−21	36 (Note: Tondela are ranked ahead of Boavista on head-to-head points: Tondela 4, Boavista 1.)
13	Boavista	34	8	12	14	39	49	−10	36
14	Portimonense	34	9	8	17	34	41	−7	35 (Note: Portimonense are ranked ahead of Marítimo on head-to-head points: Portimonense 4, Marítimo 1.)
15	Marítimo	34	10	5	19	27	47	−20	35

Source: Liga Portugal
Rules for classification: 1) Points; 2) Head-to-head points; 3) Head-to-head goal difference; 4) Head-to-head away goals scored; 5) Goal difference; 6) Matches won; 7) Goals scored; 8) Play-off.

==== Results summary ====
Overall								Home						Away					
Pld	W	D	L	GF	GA	GD	Pts	W	D	L	GF	GA	GD	W	D	L	GF	GA	GD
20	3	9	8	20	32	−12	18	2	2	6	7	16	−9	1	7	2	13	16	−3

Source: Soccerway

==== Results by round ====
Round	1	2	3	4	5	6	7	8	9	10	11	12	13	14	15	16	17	18	19	20	21
Ground	A	H	A	H	A	H	A	H	A	A	H	H	A	H	A	A	H	H	A	H	A
Result	D	L	D	L	D	W	L	D	D	D	D	L	D	L	L	W	L	L	D	W	
Position	6	16	14	17	17	13	15	16	16	16	16	16	18	18	18	18	18	18	17	16	

Source: FBref
A = Away; H = Home; W = Win; D = Draw; L = Loss

==== Matches ====
The league fixtures were announced on 28 August 2020.

19 September 2020 1	Nacional	3–3	Boavista	Funchal
16:00 WEST (UTC+01:00)	Kalindi (yellow card) 27'; Riascos 28'; Victor 36'; Freitas (yellow card) 55'; Thill (yellow card) 82'; César (yellow card) 89'; Camacho 90+1'; Róchez (yellow card) 90+5'	Report	Sauer 19', 60'; Santos (yellow card) 22'; Mangas 45+2'; Gomes (yellow card) 64'; Awaziem (yellow card) 90+3'	Stadium: Estádio da Madeira; Attendance: 0 (Note: Match was played behind closed doors due to government restrictions regarding the COVID-19 pandemic in Portugal.); Referee: António Nobre

26 September 2020 2	Boavista	0–5	Porto	Porto
21:00 WEST (UTC+1)			Corona 47'; Oliveira 59'; Marega 67', 71'; Díaz 90+2'	Stadium: Estádio do Bessa; Attendance: 0 Referee: Luís Godinho

2 October 2020 3	Moreirense	1–1	Boavista	Braga
19:00 WEST (UTC+01:00)	Rosić (yellow card) 43'; Abreu 64'	Report	Gomes 9'; García (yellow card) 40'; Seabra (yellow card) 90'; Couto (red card)	Stadium: Parque de Jogos Comendador Joaquim de Almeida Freitas; Attendance: 0 Referee: Manuel Mota

19 October 2020 4	Boavista	0–1	Vitória de Guimarães	Porto
20:15 WEST (UTC+01:00)		Report	Edwards 19'	Stadium: Estádio do Bessa; Attendance: 0 Referee: Nuno Almeida

25 October 2020 5	Famalicão	2–2	Boavista	Vila Nova de Famalicão
17:30 WET (UTC±00:00)	Babić (yellow card) 48'; Assunção (yellow card) 78'; Lameiras 85'; Robert 90+3'	Report	García 75' (yellow card) (yellow-red card) 83'; Awaziem (yellow card) 65'; Hamache 69'; Paulinho (yellow card) 90+3'; Cannon (yellow card) 90+6'	Stadium: Estádio Municipal 22 de Junho; Attendance: 0 Referee: Tiago Martins

2 November 2020 6	Boavista	3–0	Benfica	Porto
21:00 WET (UTC±00:00)	Gomes 18' (pen.); Elis 38'; Show (yellow card) 59'; Reisinho (yellow card) 65'; Hamache 76'; Jardim (yellow card) 80'	Report	Vertonghen (yellow card) 45+1'; Tavares (yellow card) 66'; Gonçalves (yellow card) 90'; Otamendi (yellow card) 90+2'	Stadium: Estádio do Bessa; Attendance: 0 Referee: Hugo Miguel

8 November 2020 7	Farense	3–1	Boavista	Faro
15:00 WET (UTC±00:00)	Gauld 22'; Abner (yellow card) 40'; Stojiljković 50'; Mancha 54'; Melo (yellow card) 67'; Mansilla (yellow card) 75'; Aouacheria (yellow card) 80'	Report	Gomes (yellow card) 10' (goal) 43'	Stadium: Estádio de São Luís; Attendance: 0 Referee: Vítor Ferreira

29 November 2020 8	Boavista	0–0	Belenenses	Porto
17:30 WET (UTC±00:00)	Javi García (yellow card) 89'	Report	Cauê (yellow card) 14'; Henrique (yellow card) 15'; Silvestre Varela (yellow card) 61'; Miguel Cardoso (yellow card) 89'	Stadium: Estádio do Bessa; Attendance: 0 Referee: (Portugal) Tiago Martins

6 December 2020 9	Rio Ave	0–0	Boavista	Vila do Conde
17:30 WET (UTC±00:00)	Francisco Geraldes (yellow card) 30'; Carlos Mané (yellow card) 38'	Report		Stadium: Estádio dos Arcos; Attendance: 0 Referee: (Portugal) João Bento

20 December 2020 10	Paços de Ferreira	1–1	Boavista	Paços de Ferreira
15:00 WET (UTC±00:00)	Douglas Tanque (yellow card) 40'; João Pedro 83'	Report	Hamache (yellow card) 38'; Elis (yellow card) 45+1' (goal) 61'; Javi García (yellow card) 52'	Stadium: Estádio da Mata Real; Attendance: 0 Referee: (Portugal) Tiago Martins

28 December 2020 11	Boavista	1–4	Sporting Braga	Porto
21:00 WET (UTC±00:00)	Castro 66'; Benguché (yellow card) 81'	Report	Paulinho 4'; Iuri Medeiros 15'; Ricardo Horta 26' 69'; Ali Elmusrati (yellow card) 67'	Stadium: Estádio do Bessa; Attendance: 0 Referee: (Portugal) André Filipe Domingues Narciso

3 January 2021 12	Marítimo	0–0	Boavista	Funchal
15:00 WET (UTC±00:00)	Cláudio Winck (yellow card) 49'; René (yellow card) 75'; Rúben Macedo (yellow card) 88'	Report	Elis (yellow card) 28'; Paulinho (yellow card) 61'; Gomes (yellow card) 90+2'; Awaziem (yellow card) 90+4'	Stadium: Estádio dos Barreiros; Attendance: 0 Referee: (Portugal) Luis Miguel Branco Godinho

9 January 2021 13	Boavista	1–1	Santa Clara	Porto
20:30 WET (UTC±00:00)	Nuno Santos 20'; Cannon (yellow card) 49'; Paulinho (yellow card) 71'; Rafael Bracalli (yellow card) 71'	Report	João Afonso (yellow card) 26'; Carlos 37'; Anderson Carvalho (yellow card) 43'; Diogo Salomão (yellow card) 71'; Nené (yellow card) 87'	Stadium: Estádio do Bessa; Attendance: 0 Referee: (Portugal) António Emanuel Carvalho Nobre

16 January 2021 14	Tondela	3–1	Boavista	Tondela
20:30 WET (UTC±00:00)	Mario González 40'; Pedro Augusto (yellow card) 44'; Salvador Agra 56' 85'	Report	Castro (red card) 11'; Awaziem (red card) 30'; Ricardo Mangas 59'	Stadium: Estádio João Cardoso; Attendance: 0 Referee: (Portugal) Gustavo Fernandes Correia

26 January 2021 15	Boavista	0–2	Sporting CP	Porto
21:15 WET (UTC±00:00)	Paulinho (yellow card) 87'; Nathan (yellow card) 90'	Report	Nuno Santos 22'; Pedro Porro 77'; João Mário (yellow card) 79'; João Palhinha (yellow card) 79'	Stadium: Estádio do Bessa; Attendance: 0 Referee: (Portugal) Fábio José Costa Veríssimo

30 January 2021 16	Portimonense	1–2	Boavista	Portimão
20:30 WET (UTC±00:00)	Ewerton 36'; Maurício Antônio (yellow card) 38'; Willyan (yellow card) 77'; Dener (yellow card) 82'	Report	Alberth Elis 45'; Awaziem (yellow card) 60'; Paulinho (yellow card) 60', (goal) 63'; Gomes (yellow card) 77'	Stadium: Estádio Municipal de Portimão; Attendance: 0 Referee: Vítor Ferreira

5 February 2021 17	Boavista	1–2	Gil Vicente	Porto
21:00 WET (UTC±00:00)	Paulinho 44' (o.g.); Gomes (yellow card) 68'; Rami (yellow card) 77'	Report	Samuel Lino 22' (pen.); Nogueira (yellow card) 32'; Afonso (yellow card) 70'; Baraye 85', (yellow card) 90+1'	Stadium: Estádio do Bessa; Attendance: 0 Referee: (Portugal) Hélder Malheiro

9 February 2021 18	Boavista	0–1	Nacional	Porto
19:00 WET (UTC±00:00)	García (yellow card) 73' (yellow-red card) 73'	Report	Pedrão (yellow card) 35'; Santos 42' (o.g.); Gorré (yellow card) 71'; Azouni (yellow card) 79'; Piscitelli (yellow card) 90+1'	Stadium: Estádio do Bessa; Attendance: 0 Referee: (Portugal) Fábio Melo

13 February 2021 19	Porto	2–2	Boavista	Porto
20:30 WET (UTC±00:00)	João Mário (yellow card) 29'; Taremi 54'; Oliveira 82' (pen.), (penalty missed) 85'; Evanilson (yellow card) 90+4'	Report	Jackson Porozo 8'; Paulinho (yellow card) 18'; Elis 45+1'; Jardim (yellow card) 85'; Rami (yellow card) 90+7'; Pérez (yellow card) 90+7'	Stadium: Estádio do Dragão; Attendance: 0 Referee: (Portugal) Fábio Melo

19 February 2021 20	Boavista	1–0	Moreirense	Porto
20:30 WET (UTC±00:00)	Gomes 53'; Gustavo Sauer (yellow card) 55'; Jardim (yellow card) 73'; Santos (yellow card) 80'	Report	Simão (yellow card) 74'; D'Alberto (yellow card) 89'	Stadium: Estádio do Bessa; Attendance: 0 Referee: Artur Soares Dias

26 February 2021 21	Vitória de Guimarães	2–1	Boavista	Guimarães
20:30 WET (UTC±00:00)	Rochinha 39'; André André (yellow card) 58', (goal) 63' (pen.); Pepelu (yellow card) 84'	Report	Mangas 17', (yellow card) 62'; Gomes (yellow card) 80'; Pérez (yellow card) 85'; Devensih (yellow card) 90+6'	Stadium: Estádio D. Afonso Henriques; Attendance: 0 Referee: Fábio Veríssimo

6 March 2021 22	Boavista	3–0	Famalicão	Porto
20:30 WET (UTC±00:00)	Mangas 17'; Paulinho 65'; Pérez 90+1'; Cannon (yellow card) 90+4'; Show (yellow card) 90+5'	Report	Pêpê (yellow card) 31'; Dias (yellow card) 68'; Ugarte (red card) 75'	Stadium: Estádio do Bessa; Attendance: 0 Referee: André Narciso

13 March 2021 23	Benfica	2–0	Boavista	Lisbon
18:00 WET (UTC±00:00)	Weigl (yellow card) 29'; Taarabt (yellow card) 39'; Seferovic 42', 52'	Report	Awaziem (red card) 8'	Stadium: Estádio da Luz; Attendance: 0 Referee: Manuel Mota

21 March 2021 24	Boavista	v	Farense	Porto
17:30 WET (UTC±00:00)				Stadium: Estádio do Bessa; Attendance: 0

=== Taça de Portugal ===
22 November 2020 Third round	Vizela	0–1 (a.e.t.)	Boavista	Vizela
20:00	Samu (yellow card) 30'; Kouao (yellow card) 44'; Aidara (yellow card) 79'; Francis Cann (yellow card) 97'; Mosevich (yellow card) 102'; Matheus Costa (yellow card) 106'	Report	Paulinho (yellow card) 17'; Pérez (yellow card) 27'; Javi García (yellow card) 60'; Njie (yellow card) 90' (yellow-red card) 120+1' (goal) 104'; Show (yellow card) 105'; Léo Jardim (yellow card) 111'	Stadium: Estádio do FC Vizela; Attendance: 0 Referee: (Portugal) António Emanuel Carvalho Nobre

12 December 2020 Fourth round	Estoril	2–1	Boavista	Estoril
22:00	Hugo Gomes (yellow card) 38' (goal) 75'; Miguel Crespo 61'; Murilo (yellow card) 84'; Thiago (yellow card) 85'; João Diogo (yellow card) 90+3'	Report	Javi García (yellow card) 35'; Paulinho (yellow card) 78'; Benguché 89'; Nuno Santos (yellow card) 90+6'	Stadium: Estádio António Coimbra da Mota; Attendance: 0 Referee: (Portugal) Iancu Ioan Vasilica

== Statistics ==
=== Goalscorers ===
Rank	No.	Pos.	Player	Primeira Liga	Taça de Portugal	Total
1	10	MF	(England) Angel Gomes	4	0	4
1	17	FW	(Honduras) Alberth Elis	4	0	4
3	19	DF	(Portugal) Ricardo Mangas	3	0	3
4	8	FW	(Brazil) Gustavo Sauer	2	0	2
4	25	DF	(France) Yanis Hamache	2	0	2
6	6	MF	(Spain) Javi García	1	0	1
6	21	DF	(Ecuador) Jackson Porozo	1	0	1
6	30	MF	(Brazil) Paulinho	1	0	1
6	42	DF	(Colombia) Cristian Devenish	1	0	1
6	77	MF	(Portugal) Nuno Santos	1	0	1
6	9	FW	(Honduras) Jorge Benguché	0	1	1
6	11	FW	(The Gambia) Yusupha Njie	0	1	1
Totals				20	2	22
