= 2020–21 F.C. Famalicão season =

Famalicão
2020–21 season
- Owner: Idan Ofer
- President: Miguel Ribeiro
- Manager: João Pedro Sousa
- Stadium: Estádio Municipal 22 de Junho
- Primeira Liga: 9th
- Taça de Portugal: Fourth round
- Top goalscorer: League: Anderson; Ivo Rodrigues (6 each); All: Anderson; Ivo Rodrigues (6 each)
Home colours	Away colours	Third colours
- All statistics correct as of 19 May 2021.

The 2020–21 F.C. Famalicão season was the club's 89th year in existence and second consecutive season in the top flight of Portuguese football. In addition to the domestic league, Famalicão participated in this season's edition of the Taça de Portugal. The season covers the period from July 2020 to 30 June 2021.

== Players ==
=== First-team squad ===
As of 23 February 2021

Note: Flags indicate national team as defined under FIFA eligibility rules; some limited exceptions apply. Players may hold more than one non-FIFA nationality.

No.	Pos.	Nation	Player
1	GK	RUS	Ivan Zlobin
2	DF	ESP	Dani Morer
3	DF	SRB	Srđan Babić (on loan from Red Star Belgrade)
5	DF	NED	Calvin Verdonk
7	FW	POR	Alexandre Guedes
8	MF	URU	Manuel Ugarte
10	MF	BUL	Bozhidar Kraev (on loan from Midtjylland)
11	FW	BRA	Jhonata Robert (on loan from Grêmio)
12	MF	BRA	Gustavo Assunção
13	FW	ECU	Leonardo Campana (on loan from Wolverhampton)
15	DF	BRA	Riccieli
17	MF	ESP	Iván Jaime
18	MF	ARG	Joaquín Pereyra (on loan from Rosario Central)
19	DF	POR	Rúben Vinagre (on loan from Wolverhampton)

No.	Pos.	Nation	Player
20	MF	SRB	Andrija Luković
22	FW	ARG	Carlos Valenzuela (on loan from Barracas Central)
23	DF	POR	Diogo Queirós
24	DF	COL	Edwin Herrera (on loan from Santa Fe)
27	FW	POR	Ivo Rodrigues
28	FW	POR	Gil Dias (on loan from Monaco)
31	GK	BRA	Luiz Júnior
33	FW	BRA	Anderson
46	GK	BRA	Vaná
66	MF	POR	Bruno Jordão (on loan from Wolverhampton)
88	MF	POR	Pêpê (on loan from Olympiacos)
90	DF	POR	Diogo Figueiras
91	MF	POR	Heriberto Tavares (on loan from Brest)
97	DF	BRA	Patrick William

== Competitions ==
=== Overview ===
Competition	First match	Last match	Starting round	Final position	Record							
Competition	First match	Last match	Starting round	Final position	Pld	W	D	L	GF	GA	GD	Win %
Primeira Liga	18 September 2020	May 2021	Matchday 1		23	4	8	11	20	37	−17	17.39
Taça de Portugal	21 November 2020	12 December 2020	Third round	Fourth round	2	1	0	1	4	2	+2	50.00
Total					25	5	8	12	24	39	−15	20.00

Last updated: 15 March 2021
Source: Soccerway

=== Primeira Liga ===
==== League table ====
Pos	Team	Pld	W	D	L	GF	GA	GD	Pts
7	Vitória de Guimarães	34	12	7	15	37	44	−7	43 (Note: Vitória de Guimarães are ranked ahead of Moreirense on head-to-head points: Vitória de Guimarães 4, Moreirense 1.)
8	Moreirense	34	10	13	11	37	43	−6	43
9	Famalicão	34	10	10	14	40	48	−8	40 (Note: Famalicão are ranked ahead of Belenenses SAD on head-to-head points: Famalicão 4, Belenenses SAD 1.)
10	B-SAD	34	9	13	12	25	35	−10	40
11	Gil Vicente	34	11	6	17	33	42	−9	39

Source: Liga Portugal
Rules for classification: 1) Points; 2) Head-to-head points; 3) Head-to-head goal difference; 4) Head-to-head away goals scored; 5) Goal difference; 6) Matches won; 7) Goals scored; 8) Play-off.

==== Results summary ====
Overall								Home						Away					
Pld	W	D	L	GF	GA	GD	Pts	W	D	L	GF	GA	GD	W	D	L	GF	GA	GD
23	4	8	11	20	37	−17	20	1	6	5	11	21	−10	3	2	6	9	16	−7

Last updated: 15 March 2021.
Source: Liga Portugal

==== Results by round ====
Round	1	2	3	4	5	6	7	8	9	10	11	12	13	14	15	16	17	18	19	20	21	22	23
Ground	H	A	H	A	H	A	H	A	H	A	H	A	H	A	H	A	H	A	H	A	H	A	H
Result	L	W	D	D	D	L	W	L	D	D	L	L	L	W	L	L	L	L	D	W	D	L	D
Position	18	6	7	9	9	12	10	10	11	8	12	14	16	13	15	16	17	17	18	16	17	17	17

Updated to match(es) played on 15 March 2021. Source: Liga Portugal
A = Away; H = Home; W = Win; D = Draw; L = Loss

==== Matches ====
The league fixtures were announced on 28 August 2020.

18 September 2020 1	Famalicão	1–5	Benfica	Vila Nova de Famalicão
19:00 WEST (UTC+1)	Pereira (yellow card) 45'; Guga 67'	Report	Waldschmidt 19', 66'; Everton 21'; Dias (yellow card) 27'; Grimaldo 42'; Silva 52'; Gabriel (yellow card) 71'	Stadium: Estádio Municipal 22 de Junho; Attendance: 0 (Note: The match was played behind closed doors due to the COVID-19 pandemic in Portugal.); Referee: Luís Godinho

28 September 2020 2	Belenenses	1–2	Famalicão	Lisbon
19:45 WEST (UTC+1)	Phete (yellow card) 25'; Esgaio (yellow card) 36'; Cassierra 42'; Varela (yellow card) 62'	Report	Assunção (yellow card) 16'; Riccieli 52'; Valenzuela 56'; William (yellow card) 90+1'; Campana (yellow card) 90+3'; Walterson (yellow card) 90+4'; Pereyra (yellow card) 90+6'	Stadium: Estádio Nacional; Attendance: 0 Referee: Hélder Malheiro

4 October 2020 3	Famalicão	1–1	Rio Ave	Vila Nova de Famalicão
18:30 WEST (UTC+1)	Lameiras 22'; Jordão (yellow card) 47'; Campana (yellow card) 56'	Report	Aderlan Santos 78'	Stadium: Estádio Municipal 22 de Junho; Attendance: 0 Referee: Artur Soares Dias

18 October 2020 4	Farense	3–3	Famalicão	Faro
16:00 WEST (UTC+1)	Mancha 4'; César 25'; Pinto (yellow card) 44'; Mancha (yellow card) 49'; Mansilla 90+4'	Report	Herrera (yellow card) 61' (yellow-red card) 88'; Lameiras 65' (pen.), 73'; Jordão 80'	Stadium: Estádio de São Luís; Attendance: 0 Referee: André Narciso

25 October 2020 5	Famalicão	2–2	Boavista	Vila Nova de Famalicão
17:30 WET (UTC±0)	Babić (yellow card) 48'; Assunção (yellow card) 78'; Lameiras 85'; Robert 90+3'	Report	García (yellow card) 37' (yellow-red card) 83', (goal) 75'; Awaziem (yellow card) 65'; Hamache 69'; Paulinho (yellow card) 90+3'; Cannon (yellow card) 90+6'	Stadium: Estádio Municipal 22 de Junho; Attendance: 0 Referee: Tiago Martins

2 November 2020 6	Braga	1–0	Famalicão	Braga
18:45 WET (UTC±0)	Viana 74'			Stadium: Estádio Municipal de Braga; Attendance: 0 Referee: Rui Costa

7 November 2020 7	Famalicão	2–1	Marítimo	Vila Nova de Famalicão
18:00 WET (UTC±0)	Babić 28'; Valenzuela 32'		Joel 12'	Stadium: Estádio Municipal 22 de Junho; Attendance: 0 Referee: Luis Godinho

27 November 2020 8	Paços de Ferreira	2–0	Famalicão	Paços de Ferreira
19:00 WET (UTC±0)	Singh 20'; Costa (yellow card) 22'; Douglas (yellow card) 33'; Ferreira (yellow card) 70'; Reabciuk (yellow card) 80'; Uilton 89'	Report	Babić (yellow card) 17'; Verdonk (yellow card) 70'; Jordão (yellow card) 83'; Gustavo Assunção (yellow card) 90+3'	Stadium: Estádio da Mata Real; Attendance: 0 Referee: João Bento

5 December 2020 9	Famalicão	2–2	Sporting CP	Vila Nova de Famalicão
18:00 WET (UTC±0)	Campana (yellow card) 8'; Gustavo Assunção 43', (yellow card) 68'; Riccieli (yellow card) 45'; Pereyra (yellow card) 45+2'; Babić (yellow card) 73'; Jhonata Robert (yellow card) 83', (goal) 89'	Report	Gonçalves (yellow card) 22' (yellow-red card) 80', (goal) 37'; Santos (yellow card) 45'; Porro 45+3'; Palhinha (yellow card) 87'	Stadium: Estádio Municipal 22 de Junho; Attendance: 0 Referee: Luis Godinho

18 December 2020 10	Portimonense	0–0	Famalicão	Portimão
20:30 WET (UTC±0)	Dener (yellow card) 56'; Willyan (yellow card) 59'; Boa Morte (yellow card) 75'	Report	Morer (yellow card) 25'; Guga (yellow card) 60'; Pereyra (yellow card) 63'	Stadium: Estádio Municipal de Portimão; Attendance: 0 Referee: Hugo Miguel

27 December 2020 11	Famalicão	0–1	Gil Vicente	Vila Nova de Famalicão
15:00 WET (UTC±0)	Pereyra (yellow card) 45+2'	Report	Gonçalves 40'; João Afonso (yellow card) 90'	Stadium: Estádio Municipal 22 de Junho; Attendance: 0 Referee: Artur Soares Dias

3 January 2021 12	Tondela	1–0	Famalicão	Tondela
13:00 WET (UTC±0)	Jaume (yellow card) 12'; Martínez (yellow card) 43'; González 53'; Murillo (yellow card) 79'; Jaquité (yellow card) 90+6'	Report	Jaime (yellow card) 42'; Luković (yellow card) 60'; Campana (yellow card) 63'; Jhonata Robert (yellow card) 85'; Gustavo Assunção (yellow card) 90+4'	Stadium: Estádio João Cardoso; Attendance: 0 Referee: Miguel Nogueira

8 January 2021 13	Famalicão	1–4	Porto	Vila Nova de Famalicão
21:00 WET (UTC±0)	Queirós (yellow card) 15'; Jhonata Robert 20'; Vaná (yellow card) 31'; Gustavo Assunção (yellow card) 41'; Riccieli (yellow card) 55'; Morer (yellow card) 90+3'	Report	Mbemba (yellow card) 11'; Taremi 12', 58'; Oliveira 32'; João Mário 89'	Stadium: Estádio Municipal 22 de Junho; Attendance: 0 Referee: Rui Costa

17 January 2021 14	Santa Clara	1–2	Famalicão	Ponta Delgada, Azores
16:30 WET (UTC±0)	Lucas (yellow card) 26'; Carvalho (yellow card) 41'; Ramos (yellow card) 63'; Queirós 70' (o.g.); Carlos (yellow card) 71'; Costinha (yellow card) 76'	Report	Jhonata Robert 51'; Jaime (yellow card) 53'; William (yellow card) 72'; Luković 83'; Vinagre (yellow card) 85'; Rodrigues (yellow card) 86'	Stadium: Estádio de São Miguel; Attendance: 0 Referee: Fábio Melo

24 January 2021 15	Famalicão	0–1	Vitória de Guimarães	Vila Nova de Famalicão
20:15 WET (UTC±0)	Ugarte (yellow card) 68'; Pereyra (yellow card) 90+3'	Report	Almeida 12', (yellow card) 54'; Estupiñán (yellow card) 16'; Fernandes (yellow card) 85'; Wakaso (yellow card) 87'	Stadium: Estádio Municipal 22 de Junho; Attendance: 0 Referee: Hugo Miguel

31 January 2021 16	Nacional	2–1	Famalicão	Madeira
15:30 WET (UTC±0)	Gorré (yellow card) 34'; Azouni (yellow card) 36'; Róchez 53'; Ramos 57'; Borges (yellow card) 90+3'; Camacho (yellow card) 90+4'; Piscitelli (yellow card) 90+6'	Report	Anderson 32'; Ugarte (yellow card) 80'	Stadium: Estádio da Madeira; Attendance: 0 Referee: Tiago Martins

4 February 2021 17	Famalicão	0–2	Moreirense	Vila Nova de Famalicão
21:30 WET (UTC±0)	Jhonata Robert (yellow card) 72' (yellow-red card) 89'	Report	Riccieli 24' (o.g.); Rosić (yellow card) 36'; Yan 45'; Pacheco (yellow card) 63'; Pasinato (yellow card) 65'; Walterson (yellow card) 74'; Camará (yellow card) 78'	Stadium: Estádio Municipal 22 de Junho; Attendance: 0 Referee: André Narciso

8 February 2021 18	Benfica	2–0	Famalicão	Lisbon
19:00 WET (UTC±0)	Núñez 3'; Otamendi 7', (yellow card) 72'; Taarabt (yellow card) 56'; Gilberto (yellow card) 87'	Report	Babić (yellow card) 29'; Vinagre (yellow card) 58'	Stadium: Estádio da Luz; Attendance: 0 Referee: Hugo Miguel

12 February 2021 19	Famalicão	0–0	Belenenses SAD	Vila Nova de Famalicão
20:30 WET (UTC±0)	Verdonk (yellow card) 44'; Rodrigues (yellow card) 48'; Pêpê (yellow card) 83'	Report	Varela (yellow card) 22'; Esgaio (yellow card) 58'; Phete (yellow card) 69'; Ramires (yellow card) 90+3'	Stadium: Estádio Municipal 22 de Junho; Attendance: 0 Referee: Nuno Almeida

21 February 2021 20	Rio Ave	0–1	Famalicão	Vila do Conde
15:00 WET (UTC±0)	Monte (red card) 29'; Filipe Augusto (yellow card) 59'	Report	Tavares (yellow card) 25'; Ugarte 40'; Queirós (yellow card) 45+1'; Vinagre (yellow card) 52'	Stadium: Estádio dos Arcos; Attendance: 0 Referee: Hugo Silva

28 February 2021 21	Famalicão	0–0	Farense	Vila Nova de Famalicão
15:30 WET (UTC±0)	Ugarte (yellow card) 66'; Dias (yellow card) 73'	Report	André Pinto (yellow card) 39' (yellow-red card) 50'; Lucca (yellow card) 59'; Isidoro (yellow card) 76'; Tavares (yellow card) 90+3'; Gauld (yellow card) 90+4'	Stadium: Estádio Municipal 22 de Junho; Attendance: 0 Referee: Luís Godinho

6 March 2021 22	Boavista	3–0	Famalicão	Porto
21:30 WET (UTC±0)	Mangas 17'; Paulinho 65'; Pérez 90+1'; Cannon (yellow card) 90+4'; Show (yellow card) 90+5'	Report	Pêpê (yellow card) 31'; Dias (yellow card) 68'; Ugarte (red card) 75'	Stadium: Estádio de Bessa; Attendance: 0 Referee: André Narciso

15 March 2021 23	Famalicão	2–2	Braga	Vila Nova de Famalicão
20:15 WET (UTC±0)	Anderson 18'; Figueiras (yellow card) 68'; Assunção (yellow card) 70'; Tavares 87'; Dias (yellow card) 90+3'	Report	Esgaio (yellow card) 17'; R. Horta 36' (pen.); Elmusrati 39'; Rodrigues (yellow card) 85'	Stadium: Estádio Municipal 22 de Junho; Attendance: 0 Referee: Manuel Oliveira

=== Taça de Portugal ===
21 November 2020 Third round	Oriental de Lisboa	0–3	Famalicão	Lisbon
11:15 WET (UTC±0)	Crespo (yellow card) 61'; Tomás Silva (yellow card) 72'	Report	Dias 50'; Ruizinho 69' (o.g.); Queirós 83'; Mores (yellow card) 87'	Stadium: Estádio Engenheiro Carlos Salema; Attendance: 0 Referee: Hugo Miguel

12 December 2020 Fourth round	Rio Ave	2–1	Famalicão	Vila do Conde
15:00 WET (UTC±0)	Dala 11'; Lopes (yellow card) 28', (goal) 74'; Santos (yellow card) 49'; Augusto (yellow card) 82'; Tarantini (yellow card) 87'; Pereira (yellow card) 90+6'	Report	Herrera (yellow card) 39'; João Neto (yellow card) 51'; Babić (yellow card) 67'; Dias 79'	Stadium: Estádio dos Arcos; Attendance: 0 Referee: Tiago Martins

== Statistics ==
=== Goalscorers ===
As of 23 February 2021

Rank	No.	Pos	Nat	Name	Primeira Liga	Taça de Portugal	Taça da Liga	Total
1	10	MF	(Portugal)	Rúben Lameiras	4	0	0	4
1	11	FW	(Brazil)	Jhonata Robert	4	0	0	4
3	22	FW	(Argentina)	Carlos Valenzuela	2	0	0	2
3	28	MF	(Portugal)	Gil Dias	0	2	0	2
5	3	DF	(Serbia)	Srđan Babić	1	0	0	1
5	15	DF	(Brazil)	Riccieli	1	0	0	1
5	23	DF	(Portugal)	Diogo Queirós	0	1	0	1
5	6	MF	(Portugal)	Guga	1	0	0	1
5	8	MF	(Uruguay)	Manuel Ugarte	1	0	0	1
5	12	MF	(Brazil)	Gustavo Assunção	1	0	0	1
5	20	MF	(Serbia)	Andrija Luković	1	0	0	1
5	66	MF	(Portugal)	Bruno Jordão	1	0	0	1
5	33	FW	(Brazil)	Anderson Silva	1	0	0	1
Totals					18	3	0	21
