= Miguel Reisinho =

Miguel Reisinho may refer to:

- Miguel Reisinho (footballer, born 1975), Portuguese footballer
- Miguel Reisinho (footballer, born 1999), Portuguese footballer
