= 2019–20 AS Monaco FC season =

Monaco
2019–20 season
- President: Dmitry Rybolovlev
- Head coach: Leonardo Jardim (until 28 December); Robert Moreno (from 28 December)
- Stadium: Stade Louis II
- Ligue 1: 9th
- Coupe de France: Round of 16
- Coupe de la Ligue: Round of 16
- Top goalscorer: League: Wissam Ben Yedder (18); All: Wissam Ben Yedder (19)
- Biggest win: Monaco 5–1 Lille (21 December)
- Biggest defeat: –3 goals (thrice) (Monaco 0–3 Lyon, 9 August) (Metz 3–0 Monaco, 17 August) (Monaco 0–3 Lille, 17 December, CdlL)
| Home colours | Away colours | Third colours |

The 2019–20 season was Monaco's seventh consecutive season in Ligue 1 since promotion from Ligue 2 in 2013. Monaco finished the season in ninth position, on 1.43 points per game, after the season was ended on 30 April by the Ligue de Football Professionnel due to the COVID-19 pandemic in France. In the Coupe de France, Monaco were eliminated in the round of 16 by Saint-Étienne. In the Coupe de la Ligue, Monaco were eliminated by Lille in the same stage.

This season was the club's first since 2015–16 (2012–13 in general) without Colombian striker Radamel Falcao, who departed Monaco to join Turkish club Galatasaray.

== Season events ==
=== Transfers ===
==== Summer ====
On 13 June, AS Monaco announced that Ronaël Pierre-Gabriel would join Mainz 05 on 1 July when the transfer window opens. On 20 June, AS Monaco announced that Guevin Tormin would join Châteauroux on 1 July when the transfer window opens.

On 26 June, Khéphren Thuram moved to Derby de la Côte d'Azur rivals Nice.

On 28 June, AS Monaco announced that they had decided not to extend the contract of Andrea Raggi and that he would leave the club. The following day, 29 June, Álvaro Fernández left AS Monaco to sign for Spanish club Huesca.

On 1 July, AS Monaco announced that Gelson Martins had joined the club permanently on a five-year contract, having previously been on loan at the club from Atlético Madrid since January 2019. Also on 1 July, Kévin N'Doram joined Metz on a season-long loan, while Giulian Biancone and Loïc Badiashile moved to Cercle Brugge on season-long loans. The following day, 2 July, Adrien Bongiovanni returned to Cercle Brugge for a second season on loan at the club.

On 5 July, Julien Serrano also moved on loan to Cercle Brugge until the end of the season.

On 8 July, Youri Tielemans left AS Monaco to join Leicester City on a permanent transfer, while Ibrahima Diallo moved permanently to Brest, where he had been on loan the previous season.

On 10 July, Antonio Barreca moved to Genoa on a season-long loan deal with an option to join Genoa outright at the end of the season.

On 15 July, AS Monaco signed Benjamin Lecomte on a five-year contract for an undisclosed fee from Montpellier, and sent Jordi Mboula on loan to Cercle Brugge until the end of the season.

On 23 July, Paul Nardi left AS Monaco to sign for Lorient, while Samuel Grandsir moved to Brest on a season-long loan deal.

On 1 August, Jean-Eudes Aholou moved to Saint-Étienne on a season-long loan deal. On 5 August, Han-Noah Massengo made a permanent move to Bristol City.

On 6 August, AS Monaco announced the signing of Ruben Aguilar on a five-year contract from Montpellier, and that Pelé had joined Reading on a season-long loan. The following day, 7 August, Djibril Sidibé moved to Everton on a season-long loan deal.

On 11 August, Nacer Chadli joined Anderlecht on a season-long loan deal, while Hannibal Mejbri joined Manchester United outright.

On 12 August, Irvin Cardona moved to Brest, and Henry Onyekuru signed from Everton on a five-year contract.

On 14 August, AS Monaco announced the signing of Wissam Ben Yedder to a five-year contract from Sevilla, while Rony Lopes moved in the opposite direction.

On 21 August, AS Monaco announced the signing of Islam Slimani on a season-long loan deal from Leicester City.

On 23 August Adrien Silva returned to AS Monaco on a season-long loan deal from Leicester City. The following day, 24 August, Guillermo Maripán signed on a five-year contract from Alavés.

On 28 August, Franco Antonucci left AS Monaco to sign for Volendam on a season-long loan deal,. with Arthur Zagre signing on a three-year contract from Paris Saint-Germain the following day.

On 30 August, Jonathan Panzo and Lyle Foster both moved on season-long loan deals to Cercle Brugge. The following day, AS Monaco announced the signing of Tiémoué Bakayoko on a season-long loan deal with an option to purchase outright, and that Adama Traoré had joined Metz on a season-long loan deal.

On 1 September, AS Monaco announced the season-long loan signing of Jean-Kévin Augustin from RB Leipzig, with an option to make the move permanent in the summer of 2020.

On 2 September, Robert Navarro left AS Monaco to join Real Sociedad on a permanent transfer, and Wilson Isidor moved to Laval on loan for the season. Also on 2 September, Dinis Almeida joined Lokomotiv Plovdiv outright, while Radamel Falcao joined Galatasaray.

On 17 September, Sofiane Diop joined Sochaux on loan until the end of the season.

==== Winter ====
On 3 January, AS Monaco announced the signing of Strahinja Pavlović from Partizan on a contract until June 2024 while remaining at Partizan on loan for the remainder of the season.

On 5 January, Henry Onyekuru moved to Galatasaray on loan for the remainder of the season.

On 17 January, Naldo left AS Monaco by mutual consent.

On 27 January, Jean-Kévin Augustin left AS Monaco after his loan from RB Leipzig was ended early.

On 29 January, AS Monaco announced the signing of Radosław Majecki, from Legia Warsaw, Aurélien Tchouaméni from Bordeaux and Youssouf Fofana from Strasbourg all on contracts until June 2024. Majecki stayed at Legia Warsaw on loan for the remainder of the season, while Jordi Mboula had joined Huesca on loan until the end of season after his loan deal at Cercle Brugge had ended.

On 30 January, AS Monaco announced the signing of Jean Marcelin from Auxerre on a contract until June 2024.

On 31 January, Gil Dias moved to Granada on loan for the remainder of the season.

=== Contract extensions ===
On 1 July, Chrislain Matsima signed his first professional contract with AS Monaco.

=== August ===
On 11 August, sports director Michael Emenalo left AS Monaco by mutual consent.

=== December ===
On 28 December, Leonardo Jardim left his role as head coach of AS Monaco, with Robert Moreno being announced as his replacement on a contract until June 2022 the same day.

=== March ===
On 13 March, the Ligue de Football Professionnel ("LFP") suspended Ligue 1 and Ligue 2 indefinitely following the outbreak of coronavirus in France.

=== April ===
On 28 April, it was announced that Ligue 1 would not resume after all sporting events in France were banned until September. Two days later, on 30 April, the LFP declared the season finished due to the COVID-19 pandemic in France, with Monaco finishing in ninth position after positions were decided on points per game.

=== June ===
On 25 June, Everton announced that they had agreed a deal with AS Monaco to extend the loan of Djibril Sidibé until the end of their season. On 29 June, AS Monaco confirmed this, along with Gil Dias' loan being extended until the end of the 2019–20 La Liga season.

=== July ===
On 1 July, AS Monaco confirmed that the loan deals for Pelé, Jordi Mboula and Antonio Barreca had all been extended until the end of their respective seasons.

== Squad ==
As of match played 7 March 2020

| No. | Name | Nationality | Position | Date of birth (age) | Signed from | Signed in | Contract ends | Apps. | Goals |
Goalkeepers
| 1 | Danijel Subašić | (Croatia) | GK | 27 October 1984 (aged 35) | Hajduk Split | 2012 | | 292 | 1 |
| 16 | Diego Benaglio | (Switzerland) | GK | 8 September 1983 (aged 36) | VfL Wolfsburg | 2017 | 2020 | 38 | 0 |
| 30 | Seydou Sy | (Senegal) | GK | 12 December 1995 (aged 24) | Academy | 2014 | | 8 | 0 |
| 40 | Benjamin Lecomte | (France) | GK | 26 April 1991 (aged 29) | Montpellier | 2019 | 2024 | 32 | 0 |
Defenders
| 2 | Fodé Ballo-Touré | (France) | DF | 3 January 1997 (aged 23) | Lille | 2019 | 2023 | 45 | 0 |
| 3 | Guillermo Maripán | (Chile) | DF | 6 May 1994 (aged 25) | Alavés | 2019 | 2024 | 24 | 2 |
| 5 | Jemerson | (Brazil) | DF | 24 August 1992 (aged 27) | Atlético Mineiro | 2016 | 2021 | 101 | 2 |
| 12 | Ruben Aguilar | (France) | DF | 26 April 1993 (aged 27) | Montpellier | 2019 | 2024 | 23 | 1 |
| 15 | Jean Marcelin | (France) | DF | 12 February 2000 (aged 20) | Auxerre | 2020 | 2024 | 0 | 0 |
| 18 | Arthur Zagre | (France) | DF | 4 October 2001 (aged 18) | Paris Saint-Germain | 2019 | 2022 | 3 | 0 |
| 25 | Kamil Glik | (Poland) | DF | 3 February 1988 (aged 32) | Torino | 2016 | 2020 | 166 | 14 |
| 28 | Jorge | (Brazil) | DF | 28 March 1996 (aged 24) | Flamengo | 2017 | | 34 | 2 |
| 32 | Benoît Badiashile | (France) | DF | 6 March 2001 (aged 19) | Academy | 2016 | | 46 | 1 |
| 39 | Benjamin Henrichs | (Germany) | DF | 23 February 1997 (aged 23) | Bayer Leverkusen | 2018 | 2023 | 43 | 1 |
Midfielders
| 4 | Cesc Fàbregas | (Spain) | MF | 4 May 1987 (aged 32) | Chelsea | 2019 | 2022 | 36 | 1 |
| 6 | Tiémoué Bakayoko | (France) | MF | 17 August 1994 (aged 25) | loan from Chelsea | 2019 | 2020 | 115 | 6 |
| 8 | Adrien Silva | (Portugal) | MF | 15 March 1989 (aged 31) | loan from Leicester City | 2019 | 2020 | 40 | 0 |
| 17 | Aleksandr Golovin | (Russia) | MF | 30 May 1996 (aged 23) | CSKA Moscow | 2018 | 2023 | 65 | 7 |
| 22 | Youssouf Fofana | (France) | MF | 10 January 1999 (aged 21) | Strasbourg | 2020 | 2024 | 7 | 0 |
| 24 | Aurélien Tchouaméni | (France) | MF | 27 January 2000 (aged 20) | Bordeaux | 2020 | 2024 | 3 | 0 |
| 34 | Moussa Sylla | (France) | MF | 25 November 1999 (aged 20) | Academy | 2014 | | 34 | 4 |
Forwards
| 9 | Wissam Ben Yedder | (France) | FW | 12 August 1990 (aged 29) | Sevilla | 2019 | 2024 | 31 | 19 |
| 10 | Stevan Jovetić | (Montenegro) | FW | 2 November 1989 (aged 30) | Inter Milan | 2017 | | 44 | 14 |
| 11 | Gelson Martins | (Portugal) | FW | 11 May 1995 (aged 24) | Atlético Madrid | 2019 | 2024 | 40 | 8 |
| 13 | Willem Geubbels | (France) | FW | 16 August 2001 (aged 18) | Lyon | 2018 | | 2 | 0 |
| 14 | Keita Baldé | (Senegal) | FW | 8 March 1995 (aged 25) | Lazio | 2017 | | 60 | 16 |
| 19 | Pietro Pellegri | (Italy) | FW | 17 March 2001 (aged 19) | Genoa | 2018 | | 5 | 1 |
| 20 | Islam Slimani | (Algeria) | FW | 18 June 1988 (aged 31) | loan from Leicester City | 2019 | 2020 | 19 | 9 |
U23
| | Jordy Gaspar | (France) | DF | 23 April 1997 (aged 23) | Lyon | 2017 | 2020 | 0 | 0 |
| | Romain Faivre | (France) | MF | 14 July 1998 (aged 21) | Tours | 2017 | | 4 | 0 |
| | Gobé Gouano | (France) | FW | 10 December 2000 (aged 19) | Academy | 2018 | | 1 | 0 |
Players away on loan
| | Loïc Badiashile | (France) | GK | 5 February 1998 (aged 22) | Malesherbes | 2013 | | 6 | 0 |
| | Radosław Majecki | (Poland) | GK | 16 November 1999 (aged 20) | Legia Warsaw | 2020 | 2024 | 6 | 0 |
| | Jonathan Panzo | (England) | DF | 25 October 2000 (aged 19) | Chelsea | 2018 | | 3 | 0 |
| | Giulian Biancone | (France) | DF | 31 March 2000 (aged 20) | Academy | 2018 | | 5 | 1 |
| | Julien Serrano | (France) | DF | 13 February 1998 (aged 22) | Le Pontet | 2013 | 2022 | 11 | 0 |
| | Djibril Sidibé | (France) | DF | 29 July 1992 (aged 27) | Lille | 2016 | 2021 | 110 | 6 |
| | Antonio Barreca | (Italy) | DF | 18 March 1995 (aged 25) | Torino | 2018 | 2023 | 9 | 0 |
| | Strahinja Pavlović | (Serbia) | DF | 24 May 2001 (aged 18) | Partizan | 2020 | 2024 | 0 | 0 |
| | Franco Antonucci | (Belgium) | MF | 20 June 1999 (aged 20) | Ajax | 2017 | | 0 | 0 |
| | Adrien Bongiovanni | (Belgium) | MF | 20 September 1999 (aged 20) | Standard Liège | 2015 | | 1 | 0 |
| | Nacer Chadli | (Belgium) | MF | 2 August 1989 (aged 30) | West Bromwich Albion | 2018 | 2021 | 21 | 0 |
| | Sofiane Diop | (France) | MF | 9 June 2000 (aged 19) | Rennes | 2018 | | 21 | 0 |
| | Kévin N'Doram | (France) | MF | 28 December 1995 (aged 24) | Academy | 2014 | 2023 | 29 | 1 |
| | Pelé | (Guinea-Bissau) | MF | 29 September 1991 (aged 28) | Rio Ave | 2018 | 2023 | 11 | 0 |
| | Jean-Eudes Aholou | (Ivory Coast) | MF | 20 March 1994 (aged 26) | Strasbourg | 2018 | 2023 | 21 | 0 |
| | Adama Traoré | (Mali) | MF | 28 June 1995 (aged 24) | Lille | 2015 | | 27 | 5 |
| | Youssef Aït Bennasser | (Morocco) | MF | 7 July 1996 (aged 23) | Nancy | 2016 | | 18 | 0 |
| | Gil Dias | (Portugal) | MF | 28 September 1996 (aged 23) | Braga B | 2015 | | 17 | 0 |
| | Samuel Grandsir | (France) | FW | 14 August 1996 (aged 23) | Troyes | 2018 | 2023 | 17 | 1 |
| | Wilson Isidor | (France) | FW | 27 August 2000 (aged 19) | Rennes | 2018 | | 3 | 0 |
| | Henry Onyekuru | (Nigeria) | FW | 5 June 1997 (aged 22) | Everton | 2019 | 2024 | 4 | 0 |
| | Lyle Foster | (South Africa) | FW | 3 September 2000 (aged 19) | Orlando Pirates | 2019 | 2023 | 2 | 0 |
| | Jordi Mboula | (Spain) | FW | 16 March 1999 (aged 21) | Barcelona B | 2018 | 2022 | 10 | 1 |
Left during the season
| 7 | Rony Lopes | (Portugal) | MF | 28 December 1995 (aged 24) | Manchester City | 2015 | | 81 | 21 |
| 9 | Radamel Falcao | (Colombia) | FW | 10 February 1986 (aged 34) | Atlético Madrid | 2013 | | 139 | 83 |
| 22 | Jean-Kévin Augustin | (France) | FW | 16 June 1997 (aged 22) | loan from RB Leipzig | 2019 | 2020 | 13 | 1 |
| 26 | Boschilia | (Brazil) | MF | 5 March 1996 (aged 24) | São Paulo | 2015 | 2021 | 35 | 8 |
| 27 | Naldo | (Brazil) | DF | 10 September 1982 (aged 37) | Schalke 04 | 2019 | 2020 | 9 | 0 |
| | Robert Navarro | (Spain) | MF | 12 April 2002 (aged 18) | Barcelona | 2018 | | 1 | 0 |
| | Irvin Cardona | (France) | FW | 8 August 1997 (aged 22) | Academy | 2016 | | 7 | 0 |

=== Out on loan ===
Note: Flags indicate national team as defined under FIFA eligibility rules; some limited exceptions apply. Players may hold more than one non-FIFA nationality.

| No. | Pos. | Nation | Player |
|---|---|---|---|
| — | GK | FRA | Loïc Badiashile (on loan to Cercle Brugge) |
| — | GK | POL | Radosław Majecki (on loan to Legia Warsaw) |
| — | DF | ENG | Jonathan Panzo (on loan to Cercle Brugge) |
| — | DF | FRA | Giulian Biancone (on loan to Cercle Brugge) |
| — | DF | FRA | Julien Serrano (on loan to Cercle Brugge) |
| — | DF | FRA | Djibril Sidibé (on loan to Everton) |
| — | DF | ITA | Antonio Barreca (on loan to Genoa) |
| — | DF | SRB | Strahinja Pavlović (on loan to Partizan) |
| — | MF | BEL | Franco Antonucci (on loan to Volendam) |
| — | MF | BEL | Adrien Bongiovanni (on loan to Cercle Brugge) |
| — | MF | BEL | Nacer Chadli (on loan to Anderlecht) |
| — | MF | FRA | Sofiane Diop (on loan to Sochaux) |

| No. | Pos. | Nation | Player |
|---|---|---|---|
| — | MF | FRA | Kévin N'Doram (on loan to Metz) |
| — | MF | CIV | Jean-Eudes Aholou (on loan to Saint-Étienne) |
| — | MF | GBS | Pelé (on loan to Reading) |
| — | MF | MLI | Adama Traoré (on loan to Metz) |
| — | MF | MAR | Youssef Aït Bennasser (on loan to Bordeaux) |
| — | MF | POR | Gil Dias (on loan to Granada) |
| — | FW | FRA | Samuel Grandsir (on loan to Brest) |
| — | FW | FRA | Wilson Isidor (on loan to Laval) |
| — | FW | NGR | Henry Onyekuru (on loan to Galatasaray) |
| — | FW | RSA | Lyle Foster (on loan to Cercle Brugge) |
| — | FW | ESP | Jordi Mboula (on loan to Huesca) |

=== Reserves ===
As of 12 August 2019

Note: Flags indicate national team as defined under FIFA eligibility rules; some limited exceptions apply. Players may hold more than one non-FIFA nationality.

| No. | Pos. | Nation | Player |
|---|---|---|---|
| — | GK | MAR | Yanis Henin |
| — | DF | CMR | Pierre-Daniel N'Guinda |
| — | DF | FRA | Yoann Etienne |
| — | DF | FRA | Yannis N'Gakoutou-Yapende |
| — | DF | FRA | Abdoulaye Koté |
| — | DF | CIV | Jonathan Cissé |
| — | DF | POR | Dinis Almeida |
| — | MF | BEL | Francesco Antonucci |
| — | MF | BEL | Eliot Matazo |

| No. | Pos. | Nation | Player |
|---|---|---|---|
| — | MF | FRA | Kévin Appin |
| — | MF | FRA | Jalil Enjolras |
| — | MF | FRA | Théo Epailly |
| — | MF | FRA | Tristan Muyumba |
| — | MF | MLI | Salam Jiddou |
| — | MF | POR | Tiago Ribeiro |
| — | FW | FRA | Nabil Alioui |
| — | FW | FRA | Jason Mbock |
| — | FW | GHA | Eric Ayiah |

== Transfers ==
=== In ===
| Date | Position | Nationality | Name | From | Fee | Ref. |
|---|---|---|---|---|---|---|
| 1 July 2019 | MF | (Portugal) | Gelson Martins | Atlético Madrid | Undisclosed | |
| 15 July 2019 | GK | (France) | Benjamin Lecomte | Montpellier | Undisclosed | |
| 6 August 2019 | DF | (France) | Ruben Aguilar | Montpellier | Undisclosed | |
| 12 August 2019 | MF | (Nigeria) | Henry Onyekuru | Everton | Undisclosed | |
| 14 August 2019 | FW | (France) | Wissam Ben Yedder | Sevilla | Undisclosed | |
| 24 August 2019 | DF | (Chile) | Guillermo Maripán | Alavés | Undisclosed | |
| 29 August 2019 | DF | (France) | Arthur Zagre | Paris Saint-Germain | Undisclosed | |
| 3 January 2020 | DF | (Serbia) | Strahinja Pavlović | Partizan | Undisclosed | |
| 29 January 2020 | GK | (Poland) | Radosław Majecki | Legia Warsaw | Undisclosed | |
| 29 January 2020 | MF | (France) | Aurélien Tchouaméni | Bordeaux | Undisclosed | |
| 29 January 2020 | DF | (France) | Youssouf Fofana | Strasbourg | Undisclosed | |
| 30 January 2020 | DF | (France) | Jean Marcelin | Auxerre | Undisclosed | |

=== Loans in ===
| Date from | Position | Nationality | Name | From | Date to | Ref. |
|---|---|---|---|---|---|---|
| 21 August 2019 | FW | (Algeria) | Islam Slimani | Leicester City | End of season | |
| 23 August 2019 | MF | (Portugal) | Adrien Silva | Leicester City | End of season | |
| 31 August 2019 | MF | (France) | Tiémoué Bakayoko | Chelsea | End of season | |
| 1 September 2019 | FW | (France) | Jean-Kévin Augustin | RB Leipzig | 27 January 2020 | |

=== Out ===
| Date | Position | Nationality | Name | To | Fee | Ref. |
|---|---|---|---|---|---|---|
| 13 June 2019† | DF | (France) | Ronaël Pierre-Gabriel | Mainz 05 | Undisclosed | |
| 20 June 2019† | MF | (France) | Guevin Tormin | Châteauroux | Undisclosed | |
| 26 June 2019† | MF | (France) | Khéphren Thuram | Nice | Undisclosed | |
| 29 June 2019 | GK | (Spain) | Álvaro Fernández | Huesca | Undisclosed | |
| 8 July 2019 | MF | (Belgium) | Youri Tielemans | Leicester City | Undisclosed | |
| 8 July 2019 | MF | (France) | Ibrahima Diallo | Brest | Undisclosed | |
| 23 July 2019 | GK | (France) | Paul Nardi | Lorient | Undisclosed | |
| 5 August 2019 | MF | (France) | Han-Noah Massengo | Bristol City | Undisclosed | |
| 11 August 2019 | MF | (France) | Hannibal Mejbri | Manchester United | Undisclosed | |
| 12 August 2019 | FW | (France) | Irvin Cardona | Brest | Undisclosed | |
| 14 August 2019 | MF | (Portugal) | Rony Lopes | Sevilla | Undisclosed | |
| 2 September 2019 | DF | (Portugal) | Dinis Almeida | Lokomotiv Plovdiv | Undisclosed | |
| 2 September 2019 | MF | (Spain) | Robert Navarro | Real Sociedad | Undisclosed | |
| 2 September 2019 | FW | (Colombia) | Radamel Falcao | Galatasaray | Undisclosed | |
| 30 January 2020 | MF | (Brazil) | Boschilia | Internacional | Undisclosed | |

† Transfers announced on the above date, become official when the transfer window opens on 1 July.

=== Loans out ===
| Date from | Position | Nationality | Name | To | Date to | Ref. |
|---|---|---|---|---|---|---|
| 24 January 2019 | MF | (Portugal) | Gil Dias | Olympiacos | 30 June 2020 | |
| 1 July 2019 | GK | (France) | Loïc Badiashile | Cercle Brugge | End of season | |
| 1 July 2019 | DF | (France) | Giulian Biancone | Cercle Brugge | End of season | |
| 1 July 2019 | MF | (France) | Kévin N'Doram | Metz | End of Season | |
| 2 July 2019 | MF | (Belgium) | Adrien Bongiovanni | Cercle Brugge | End of season | |
| 5 July 2019 | DF | (France) | Julien Serrano | Cercle Brugge | End of season | |
| 10 July 2019 | DF | (Italy) | Antonio Barreca | Genoa | 16 August 2020 | |
| 15 July 2019 | FW | (Spain) | Jordi Mboula | Cercle Brugge | 28 January 2020 | |
| 24 July 2019 | FW | (France) | Samuel Grandsir | Brest | End of season | |
| 1 August 2019 | MF | (Ivory Coast) | Jean-Eudes Aholou | Saint-Étienne | End of season | |
| 6 August 2019 | MF | (Guinea-Bissau) | Pelé | Reading | 5 August 2020 | |
| 7 August 2019 | DF | (France) | Djibril Sidibé | Everton | 26 July 2020 | |
| 11 August 2019 | MF | (Belgium) | Nacer Chadli | Anderlecht | End of season | |
| 28 August 2019 | MF | (Belgium) | Franco Antonucci | Volendam | End of season | |
| 30 August 2019 | DF | (England) | Jonathan Panzo | Cercle Brugge | End of season | |
| 30 August 2019 | FW | (South Africa) | Lyle Foster | Cercle Brugge | End of season | |
| 31 August 2019 | MF | (Mali) | Adama Traoré | Metz | End of season | |
| 2 September 2019 | FW | (France) | Wilson Isidor | Laval | End of season | |
| 17 September 2019 | MF | (France) | Sofiane Diop | Sochaux | End of season | |
| 3 January 2020 | DF | (Serbia) | Strahinja Pavlović | Partizan | End of season | |
| 5 January 2020 | FW | (Nigeria) | Henry Onyekuru | Galatasaray | End of season | |
| 29 January 2020 | GK | (Poland) | Radosław Majecki | Legia Warsaw | End of season | |
| 29 January 2020 | FW | (Spain) | Jordi Mboula | Huesca | 5 August 2020 | |
| 31 January 2020 | MF | (Portugal) | Gil Dias | Granada | 31 July 2020 | |

=== Released ===
| Date | Position | Nationality | Name | Joined | Date | Ref |
|---|---|---|---|---|---|---|
| Summer 2019 | GK | (France) | Hugo Hagege | Sainte-Maxime | | |
| Summer 2019 | MF | (France) | Jonathan Mexique | Cholet | | |
| 28 June 2019 | DF | (Italy) | Andrea Raggi | Retired | | |
| 17 January 2020 | DF | (Brazil) | Naldo | Retired | | |
| 30 June 2020 | GK | (Croatia) | Danijel Subašić | | | |
| 30 June 2020 | GK | (France) | Théo Louis | Thonon Évian | 17 September 2020 | |
| 30 June 2020 | GK | (Senegal) | Seydou Sy | Nacional | 11 February 2021 | |
| 30 June 2020 | GK | (Switzerland) | Diego Benaglio | Retired | 18 August 2020 | |
| 30 June 2020 | DF | (Cameroon) | Pierre-Daniel N'Guinda | KTP | 21 March 2021 | |
| 30 June 2020 | DF | (France) | Yannis N'Gakoutou-Yapende | GOAL | 1 February 2021 | |
| 30 June 2020 | DF | (France) | Jordy Gaspar | Grenoble | 1 July 2020 | |
| 30 June 2020 | DF | (France) | Safwan Mbaé | GOAL | | |
| 30 June 2020 | MF | (France) | Kévin Appin | Hércules | | |
| 30 June 2020 | MF | (France) | Owen Maës | Red Star | 1 July 2021 | |
| 30 June 2020 | FW | (Comoros) | Nordine Ibouroi | Bembibre | 17 January 2021 | |
| 30 June 2020 | FW | (France) | Moussa Sylla | Utrecht | 15 September 2020 | |

== Friendlies ==
Win Draw Loss

| 6 July 2019 Friendly | Cercle Brugge | 1–4 | Monaco | Roeselare, Belgium |
| 19:00 CEST (UTC+2) | Saadi 8' | Report | Lopes 34' (pen.); Panzo 45'; Cardona 66'; Mboula 84' |

| 7 July 2019 Friendly | Lokeren | 5–0 | Monaco | Wetteren, Belgium |
| 17:30 CEST (UTC+2) | Hajrić 20' (pen.), 37'; Mbayo 31', 48'; Tshibuabua 79' | Report | | Stadium: Marcel De Kerpelstadion |

| 13 July 2019 Friendly | Lausanne | 2–1 | Monaco | Lausanne, Switzerland |
| 18:00 CEST (UTC+2) | Turkeš 68'; Ndoye 87' | Report | Boschilia 65' | Stadium: Stade Olympique de la Pontaise |

| 19 July 2019 Friendly | Monaco | 0–1 | Everton | Bagnes, Switzerland |
| 18:00 CEST (UTC+2) | | Report | Coleman 73' |

| 20 July 2019 Friendly | Valencia | 0–1 | Monaco | Lens, France |
| 17:00 CEST (UTC+2) | | Report | Foster 38' | Stadium: Stade Bollaert-Delelis |

| 24 July 2019 Friendly | Braga | 0–0 | Monaco | Braga, Portugal |
| 21:30 CEST (UTC+2) | | Report | | Stadium: Estádio Municipal de Braga |

| 27 July 2019 Friendly | Porto | 0–1 | Monaco | Porto, Portugal |
| 20:00 CEST (UTC+2) | | Report | Martins 22' | Stadium: Estádio do Dragão |

| 3 August 2019 Philipp Plein Cup | Monaco | 1–0 | Sampdoria | Monaco |
| 19:30 CEST (UTC+2) | Falcao 50' | Report | | Stadium: Stade Louis II |

| 15 November 2019 Friendly | Monaco | 2–1 | Genoa | Monaco |
| 16:30 CEST (UTC+2) | Boschilia 22'; Jemerson 75' | Report | Gümüş 19' | Stadium: Stade Louis II; Attendance: 0 |

== Competitions ==
Win Draw Loss Fixtures

=== Overview ===
| Competition | First match | Last match | Starting round | Final position | Record | | | | | | | |
| Competition | First match | Last match | Starting round | Final position | Pld | W | D | L | GF | GA | GD | Win % |
|---|---|---|---|---|---|---|---|---|---|---|---|---|
| Ligue 1 | 9 August 2019 | 7 March 2020 | Matchday 1 | 9th | 28 | 11 | 7 | 10 | 44 | 44 | +0 | 39.29 |
| Coupe de France | 4 January 2020 | 28 January 2020 | Round of 64 | Round of 16 | 3 | 2 | 0 | 1 | 5 | 3 | +2 | 66.67 |
| Coupe de la Ligue | 30 October 2019 | 17 December 2019 | Round of 32 | Round of 16 | 2 | 1 | 0 | 1 | 2 | 4 | −2 | 50.00 |
| Total | | | | | 33 | 14 | 7 | 12 | 51 | 51 | +0 | 42.42 |

Source: Soccerway

=== Ligue 1 ===
==== League table ====
| Pos | Team | Pld | W | D | L | GF | GA | GD | Pts | PPG |
|---|---|---|---|---|---|---|---|---|---|---|
| 7 | Lyon | 28 | 11 | 7 | 10 | 42 | 27 | +15 | 40 | 1.43 |
| 8 | Montpellier | 28 | 11 | 7 | 10 | 35 | 34 | +1 | 40 | 1.43 |
| 9 | Monaco | 28 | 11 | 7 | 10 | 44 | 44 | 0 | 40 | 1.43 |
| 10 | Strasbourg | 27 | 11 | 5 | 11 | 32 | 32 | 0 | 38 | 1.41 |
| 11 | Angers | 28 | 11 | 6 | 11 | 28 | 33 | −5 | 39 | 1.39 |

Source: Ligue 1
Rules for classification: 1) Points per game; 2) Head-to-head points; 3) Head-to-head goal difference; 4) Goal difference; 5) Goals scored; 6) Fairplay ranking.

==== Results summary ====
| Overall | | | | | | | | Home | | | | | | Away | | | | | |
| Pld | W | D | L | GF | GA | GD | Pts | W | D | L | GF | GA | GD | W | D | L | GF | GA | GD |
|---|---|---|---|---|---|---|---|---|---|---|---|---|---|---|---|---|---|---|---|
| 28 | 11 | 7 | 10 | 44 | 44 | 0 | 40 | 8 | 2 | 4 | 29 | 22 | +7 | 3 | 5 | 6 | 15 | 22 | −7 |

Source: Results

==== Results by matches ====
| Round | 1 | 2 | 3 | 4 | 5 | 6 | 7 | 8 | 9 | 10 | 11 | 12 | 13 | 14 | 15 | 16 | 17 | 18 | 19 | 20 | 21 | 22 | 23 | 24 | 25 | 26 | 27 | 28 | 29 | 30 | 31 | 32 | 33 | 34 | 35 | 36 | 37 | 38 |
|---|---|---|---|---|---|---|---|---|---|---|---|---|---|---|---|---|---|---|---|---|---|---|---|---|---|---|---|---|---|---|---|---|---|---|---|---|---|---|
| Ground | H | A | H | A | H | A | H | H | A | H | A | A | H | A | A | H | A | H | A | H | H | A | H | A | H | A | H | A | H | A | H | A | H | A | H | A | H | A |
| Result | L | L | D | D | L | D | W | W | L | W | W | L | W | L | W | W | D | W | D | L | L | L | W | W | W | D | D | L | C | C | C | C | C | C | C | C | C | C |
| Position | 20 | 20 | 19 | 19 | 19 | 19 | 18 | 12 | 18 | 14 | 11 | 15 | 11 | 14 | 13 | 11 | 9 | 7 | 8 | 9 | 13 | 13 | 10 | 7 | 5 | 5 | 7 | 9 | 9 | 9 | 9 | 9 | 9 | 9 | 9 | 9 | 9 | 9 |

Source: Results
A = Away; H = Home; W = Win; D = Draw; L = Loss; C = Cancelled

==== Results ====
The Ligue 1 schedule was announced on 14 June 2019.

| 9 August 2019 1 | Monaco | 0–3 | Lyon | Monaco |
| 20:45 CEST (UTC+2) | Fàbregas (red card) 30'; Benaglio (yellow card) 33'; Ballo-Touré (yellow card) 54' | Report | Dembélé 5'; Aouar (yellow card) 33'; Depay 36'; Dubois (yellow card) 63'; Tousart 80' | Stadium: Stade Louis II; Attendance: 12,663; Referee: Ruddy Buquet |

| 17 August 2019 2 | Metz | 3–0 | Monaco | Metz |
| 20:00 CEST (UTC+2) | Diallo 11' (pen.), 54'; Centonze (yellow card) 27'; Cohade 66' | Report | Glik (yellow card) 10'; Aguilar (red card) 34'; Gelson (yellow card) 35' | Stadium: Stade Saint-Symphorien; Attendance: 19,088; Referee: Eric Wattellier |

| 25 August 2019 3 | Monaco | 2–2 | Nîmes | Monaco |
| 15:00 CEST (UTC+2) | Slimani (yellow card) 13', (goal) 39'; Ben Yedder 45+1'; Jemerson (yellow card) 53' (yellow-red card) 56'; Golovin (yellow card) 90+2' | Report | Philippoteaux 70'; Denkey 82'; Sarr (yellow card) 90+1' | Stadium: Stade Louis II; Attendance: 7,438; Referee: Amaury Delerue |

| 1 September 2019 4 | Strasbourg | 2–2 | Monaco | Strasbourg |
| 17:00 CEST (UTC+2) | Simakan (yellow card) 13'; Lala 39' (pen.); Thomasson (yellow card) 67', (goal) 84'; Mitrović (yellow card) 69'; Costa (yellow card) 90+5' | Report | Slimani 11', 40'; Silva (yellow card) 31'; Maripán (yellow card) 37'; Martins (yellow card) 82' | Stadium: Stade de la Meinau; Attendance: 24,556; Referee: Willy Delajod |

| 15 September 2019 5 | Monaco | 3–4 | Marseille | Monaco |
| 21:00 CEST (UTC+2) | Ben Yedder 17', 27'; Ballo-Touré (yellow card) 36'; Aguilar (yellow card) 42'; Keita 76', (yellow card) 90+1' | Report | Kamara (yellow card) 15'; Benedetto 39', 67', (yellow card) 90+1'; Germain 42'; Payet 61'; González (yellow card) 62' | Stadium: Stade Louis II; Attendance: 9,147; Referee: Antony Gautier |

| 21 September 2019 6 | Reims | 0–0 | Monaco | Reims |
| 20:00 CEST (UTC+2) | | Report | Silva (yellow card) 76'; Dias (yellow card) 90+2' | Stadium: Stade Auguste Delaune; Attendance: 14,426; Referee: Olivier Thual |

| 24 September 2019 7 | Monaco | 3–1 | Nice | Monaco |
| 21:00 CEST (UTC+2) | Martins (yellow card) 23'; Golovin 29', 74'; Bakayoko (yellow card) 65'; Ben Yedder 79' | Report | Dolberg (yellow card) 24'; Nsoki (yellow card) 26'; Burner 54'; Pelmard (yellow card) 86' | Stadium: Stade Louis II; Attendance: 9,358; Referee: Mikael Lesage |

| 28 September 2019 8 | Monaco | 4–1 | Brest | Monaco |
| 20:00 CEST (UTC+2) | Ballo-Touré (yellow card) 14'; Ben Yedder 27'; Slimani 63' (pen.); Martins 74'; Keita 90' | Report | Mendy (yellow card) 51', (goal) 78'; Bain (yellow card) 89' | Stadium: Stade Louis II; Attendance: 4,576; Referee: Ruddy Buquet |

| 5 October 2019 9 | Montpellier | 3–1 | Monaco | Montpellier |
| 20:00 CEST (UTC+2) | Mollet 31'; Mendes 39'; Cozza (yellow card) 47'; Delort 56' | Report | Golovin (yellow card) 58' (yellow-red card) 82'; Ben Yedder 69' | Stadium: Stade de la Mosson; Attendance: 15,532; Referee: François Letexier |

| 20 October 2019 10 | Monaco | 3–2 | Rennes | Monaco |
| 17:00 CEST (UTC+2) | Ben Yedder 3', 90+3'; Slimani (yellow card) 54', (goal) 57'; Glik (yellow card) 90' | Report | Maouassa 12'; Hunou 49'; Camavinga (yellow card) 57'; Gnagnon (yellow card) 59'; Grenier (yellow card) 90+1' | Stadium: Stade Louis II; Attendance: 6,763; Referee: Hakim Ben El Hadj |

| 25 October 2019 11 | Nantes | 0–1 | Monaco | Nantes |
| 20:45 CEST (UTC+2) | Fábio (yellow card) 10'; Pallois (yellow card) 74' | Report | Ben Yedder 22'; Lecomte (yellow card) 90+2'; Jemerson (yellow card) 90+5' | Stadium: Stade de la Beaujoire; Attendance: 30,656; Referee: Thomas Leonard |

| 3 November 2019 12 | Saint-Étienne | 1–0 | Monaco | Saint-Étienne |
| 21:00 CET (UTC+1) | Aholou (yellow card) 32'; Bouanga 59' | Report | Silva (yellow card) 79'; Aguilar (red card) 90+2'; Henrichs (yellow card) 90+5'; Ben Yedder (yellow card) 90+5' | Stadium: Stade Geoffroy-Guichard; Attendance: 15,685; Referee: Jérôme Brisard |

| 9 November 2019 13 | Monaco | 1–0 | Dijon | Monaco |
| 20:00 CET (UTC+1) | Henrichs (yellow card) 30'; Golovin 42', (yellow card) 50' | Report | | Stadium: Stade Louis II; Attendance: 5,223; Referee: Eric Wattellier |

| 24 November 2019 14 | Bordeaux | 2–1 | Monaco | Bordeaux |
| 15:00 CET (UTC+1) | Tchouaméni (yellow card) 7'; Benito (yellow card) 23'; Bašić (yellow card) 28'; Pablo 29'; De Préville 69' (pen.) | Report | Slimani 15', (yellow card) 54' (yellow-red card) 67'; Bakayoko (yellow card) 37'; Dias (yellow card) 58'; Henrichs (yellow card) 65' | Stadium: Matmut Atlantique; Attendance: 34,554; Referee: Benoît Millot |

| 4 December 2019 16 | Toulouse | 1–2 | Monaco | Toulouse |
| 19:00 CET (UTC+1) | Sanogo 40' (pen.) | Report | Ben Yedder 5' (pen.); Glik (yellow card) 39'; Martins 84' | Stadium: Stadium de Toulouse; Attendance: 13,030; Referee: Willy Delajod |

| 7 December 2019 17 | Monaco | 3–0 | Amiens | Monaco |
| 20:00 CET (UTC+1) | Ben Yedder 61'; Maripán 67'; Keita 70' | Report | | Stadium: Stade Louis II; Attendance: 4,203; Referee: Jérémy Stinat |

| 14 December 2019 18 | Angers | 0–0 | Monaco | Angers |
| 20:00 CET (UTC+1) | Aït-Nouri (yellow card) 50'; Traoré (yellow card) 70'; Bahoken (yellow card) 76'; Capelle (yellow card) 78' | Report | Jemerson (yellow card) 40'; Silva (yellow card) 63'; Dias (yellow card) 88' | Stadium: Stade Raymond Kopa; Attendance: 9,959; Referee: Hakim Ben El Hadj |

| 21 December 2019 19 | Monaco | 5–1 | Lille | Monaco |
| 20:45 CET (UTC+1) | Martins 23'; Golovin (yellow card) 28'; Keita 30'; Maripán (yellow card) 31'; Ben Yedder 53', 65'; Aguilar (yellow card) 70'; Subašić (yellow card) 78', (red card) 78'; Glik 90+3' | Report | Fonte (yellow card) 9'; Osimhen 14' | Stadium: Stade Louis II; Attendance: 5,388; Referee: Mikael Lesage |

| 12 January 2020 20 | Paris Saint-Germain | 3–3 | Monaco | Paris |
| 21:00 CET (UTC+1) | Neymar 3', 42' (pen.); Ballo-Touré 24' (o.g.) | Report | Martins 7'; Keita (yellow card) 10'; Ben Yedder 13'; Slimani 70'; Bakayoko (yellow card) 84'; Ballo-Touré (yellow card) 88' | Stadium: Parc des Princes; Attendance: 47,580; Referee: Antony Gautier |

| 15 January 2020 15 | Monaco | 1–4 | Paris Saint-Germain | Monaco |
| 21:00 CET (UTC+1) | Glik (yellow card) 45'; Bakayoko (yellow card) 81', (goal) 87' | Report | Mbappé 24', 90+1'; Neymar 45+2' (pen.); Kouassi (yellow card) 68'; Sarabia 72'; Kurzawa (yellow card) 86' | Stadium: Stade Louis II; Attendance: 11,214; Referee: François Letexier |
Note: Match originally scheduled for 1 December, but postponed due to adverse weather conditions, and rearranged for 15 January 2020.

| 25 January 2020 21 | Monaco | 1–3 | Strasbourg | Monaco |
| 20:00 CET (UTC+1) | Jovetić (yellow card) 81', (goal) 86' | Report | Ajorque 40'; Thomasson 66'; Mitrović 74' | Stadium: Stade Louis II; Attendance: 4,800; Referee: Eric Wattellier |

| 1 February 2020 22 | Nîmes | 3–1 | Monaco | Nîmes |
| 20:00 CET (UTC+1) | Martinez (yellow card) 11', (goal) 79'; Miguel 27', (yellow card) 45+3'; Philippoteaux 62'; Sarr (yellow card) 90+1' | Report | Ben Yedder 13'; Bakayoko (red card) 32'; Martins (red card) 32'; Fofana (yellow card) 33'; Silva (yellow card) 81'; Tchouaméni (yellow card) 86' | Stadium: Stade des Costières; Attendance: 12,580; Referee: Mikael Lesage |

| 4 February 2020 23 | Monaco | 1–0 | Angers | Monaco |
| 19:00 CET (UTC+1) | Jovetić 18'; Silva (yellow card) 73'; Tchouaméni (yellow card) 79' | Report | Traoré (yellow card) 55'; Pavlović (yellow card) 83' | Stadium: Stade Louis II; Attendance: 3,585; Referee: Jérémy Stinat |

| 8 February 2020 24 | Amiens | 1–2 | Monaco | Amiens |
| 20:00 CET (UTC+1) | Guirassy 9'; Diabaté (yellow card) 42' | Report | Silva (yellow card) 66'; Golovin (yellow card) 70'; Jovetić (yellow card) 84'; Ben Yedder 85'; Slimani 90+3' | Stadium: Stade de la Licorne; Attendance: 11,683; Referee: Olivier Thual |

| 14 February 2020 25 | Monaco | 1–0 | Montpellier | Monaco |
| 20:45 CET (UTC+1) | Slimani (yellow card) 22', (goal) 52' | Report | Savanier (yellow card) 54'; Le Tallec (yellow card) 86' | Stadium: Stade Louis II; Attendance: 4,384; Referee: Ruddy Buquet |

| 22 February 2020 26 | Dijon | 1–1 | Monaco | Dijon |
| 20:00 CET (UTC+1) | Baldé 56'; Ecuele Manga (yellow card) 90' | Report | Maripán 79' | Stadium: Stade Gaston Gérard; Attendance: 13,657; Referee: François Letexier |

| 29 February 2020 27 | Monaco | 1–1 | Reims | Monaco |
| 20:00 CET (UTC+1) | Ben Yedder 31' (pen.); Keita (yellow card) 55'; Tchouaméni (yellow card) 81' | Report | Foket (yellow card) 29'; Kamara 58'; Romao (yellow card) 74'; Munetsi (yellow card) 84' | Stadium: Stade Louis II; Attendance: 4,237; Referee: Hakim Ben El Hadj |

| 7 March 2020 28 | Nice | 2–1 | Monaco | Nice |
| 20:00 CET (UTC+1) | Danilo (yellow card) 51'; Dolberg 59', 90+2' | Report | Glik (yellow card) 24'; Ben Yedder 32'; Fàbregas (yellow card) 71'; Slimani (yellow card) 82'; Jovetić (red card) 86' | Stadium: Allianz Riviera; Referee: Amaury Delerue |

| 15 March 2020 29 | Monaco | Cancelled | Saint-Étienne | Monaco |
| 17:00 CET (UTC+1) | | | | Stadium: Stade Louis II; Attendance: 0 |
Note: Match originally postponed on 13 March due to the COVID-19 pandemic, with the season being declared over on 28 April.

| 20 March 2020 30 | Lille | Cancelled | AS Monaco | Villeneuve-d'Ascq |
| 19:45 CET (UTC+1) | | | | Stadium: Stade Pierre-Mauroy |
Note: Match originally postponed on 13 March due to the COVID-19 pandemic, with the season being declared over on 28 April.

| 5 April 2020 31 | AS Monaco | Cancelled | Nantes | Monaco |
| 14:00 CEST (UTC+2) | | | | Stadium: Stade Louis II |
Note: Match originally postponed on 13 March due to the COVID-19 pandemic, with the season being declared over on 28 April.

| 11 April 2020 32 | Brest | Cancelled | AS Monaco | Brest |
| 19:00 CEST (UTC+2) | | | | Stadium: Stade Francis-Le Blé |
Note: Match originally postponed on 13 March due to the COVID-19 pandemic, with the season being declared over on 28 April.

| 18 April 2020 33 | AS Monaco | Cancelled | Bordeaux | Monaco |
| 19:00 CEST (UTC+2) | | | | Stadium: Stade Louis II |
Note: Match originally postponed on 13 March due to the COVID-19 pandemic, with the season being declared over on 28 April.

| 26 April 2020 34 | Lyon | Cancelled | AS Monaco | Décines-Charpieu |
| 19:00 CEST (UTC+2) | | | | Stadium: Groupama Stadium |
Note: Match originally postponed on 13 March due to the COVID-19 pandemic, with the season being declared over on 28 April.

| 2 May 2020 35 | AS Monaco | Cancelled | Metz | Monaco |
| 19:00 CEST (UTC+2) | | | | Stadium: Stade Louis II |
Note: Match originally postponed on 13 March due to the COVID-19 pandemic, with the season being declared over on 28 April.

| 9 May 2020 36 | Marseille | Cancelled | AS Monaco | Marseille |
| 19:00 CEST (UTC+2) | | | | Stadium: Stade Vélodrome |
Note: Match originally postponed on 13 March due to the COVID-19 pandemic, with the season being declared over on 28 April.

| 16 May 2020 37 | AS Monaco | Cancelled | Toulouse | Monaco |
| 19:00 CEST (UTC+2) | | | | Stadium: Stade Louis II |
Note: Match originally postponed on 13 March due to the COVID-19 pandemic, with the season being declared over on 28 April.

| 23 May 2020 38 | Rennes | Cancelled | AS Monaco | Rennes |
| 19:00 CEST (UTC+2) | | | | Stadium: Roazhon Park |
Note: Match originally postponed on 13 March due to the COVID-19 pandemic, with the season being declared over on 28 April.

=== Coupe de France ===
| 4 January 2020 Round of 64 | Monaco | 2–1 | Reims | Monaco |
| 15:00 CET (UTC+1) | Ballo-Touré (yellow card) 54'; Keita 61', 90+4', (yellow card) 90+4'; Silva (yellow card) 84'; Ben Yedder (yellow card) 90' | Report | Munetsi (yellow card) 65'; Dia 69'; Kamara (penalty missed) 85' | Stadium: Stade Louis II; Attendance: 3,500; Referee: Willy Delajod |

| 20 January 2020 Round of 32 | Saint-Pryvé Saint-Hilaire | 1–3 | Monaco | Orléans |
| 20:55 CET (UTC+1) | Antoine 83' | Report | Keita 12', 29'; Ben Yedder 36'; Jorge (yellow card) 85' | Stadium: Stade de la Source; Attendance: 7,300; Referee: Frank Schneider |
Note: Match was played at the Stade de la Source in Orléans instead of their regular Le Grand Clos stadium in Saint-Pryvé-Saint-Mesmin.

| 28 January 2020 Round of 16 | Monaco | 0–1 | Saint-Étienne | Monaco |
| 20:55 CET (UTC+1) | Golovin (yellow card) 90+3' | Report | Bouanga 24'; Aholou (yellow card) 46'; Fofana (yellow card) 49'; M'Vila (yellow card) 67'; Cabaye (yellow card) 72' | Stadium: Stade Louis II; Attendance: 3,485; Referee: Johan Hamel |

=== Coupe de la Ligue ===
| 30 October 2019 Round of 32 | Monaco | 2–1 | Marseille | Monaco |
| 21:05 CET (UTC+1) | Jemerson (yellow card) 19'; Augustin 25'; Aguilar 40' | Report | Ćaleta-Car (yellow card) 62'; Lecomte 77' (o.g.); Amavi (yellow card) 82' | Stadium: Stade Louis II; Attendance: 9,883; Referee: Mikael Lesage |

| 17 December 2019 Round of 16 | Monaco | 0–3 | Lille | Monaco |
| 21:05 CET (UTC+1) | Slimani (penalty missed) 55' | Report | Osimhen 19'; Bradarić (yellow card) 31'; André (yellow card) 45+1'; Rémy 45+2', 86'; Xeka (yellow card) 48'; Soumaoro (yellow card) 54' | Stadium: Stade Louis II; Attendance: 5,384; Referee: Johan Hamel |

== Statistics ==
=== Appearances and goals ===
| No. | Pos | Nat | Player | Total | | Ligue 1 | | Coupe de France | | Coupe de la Ligue | |
| No. | Pos | Nat | Player | Apps | Goals | Apps | Goals | Apps | Goals | Apps | Goals |
|---|---|---|---|---|---|---|---|---|---|---|---|
| 1 | GK | (Croatia) CRO | Danijel Subašić | 1 | 0 | 0 | 0 | 0 | 0 | 1 | 0 |
| 2 | DF | (France) FRA | Fodé Ballo-Touré | 25 | 0 | 18+3 | 0 | 1+1 | 0 | 2 | 0 |
| 3 | DF | (Chile) CHI | Guillermo Maripán | 24 | 2 | 20 | 2 | 2 | 0 | 2 | 0 |
| 4 | MF | (Spain) ESP | Cesc Fàbregas | 22 | 0 | 13+6 | 0 | 1 | 0 | 2 | 0 |
| 5 | DF | (Brazil) BRA | Jemerson | 14 | 0 | 12 | 0 | 1 | 0 | 1 | 0 |
| 6 | MF | (France) FRA | Tiémoué Bakayoko | 23 | 1 | 20 | 1 | 1+1 | 0 | 1 | 0 |
| 8 | MF | (Portugal) POR | Adrien Silva | 25 | 0 | 13+9 | 0 | 1+1 | 0 | 1 | 0 |
| 9 | FW | (France) FRA | Wissam Ben Yedder | 31 | 19 | 25+1 | 18 | 3 | 1 | 0+2 | 0 |
| 10 | FW | (Montenegro) MNE | Stevan Jovetić | 13 | 2 | 6+3 | 2 | 1+2 | 0 | 0+1 | 0 |
| 11 | FW | (Portugal) POR | Gelson Martins | 23 | 4 | 20+1 | 4 | 2 | 0 | 0 | 0 |
| 12 | DF | (France) FRA | Ruben Aguilar | 23 | 1 | 11+8 | 0 | 2 | 0 | 2 | 1 |
| 14 | FW | (Senegal) SEN | Keita Baldé | 26 | 8 | 9+12 | 4 | 3 | 4 | 2 | 0 |
| 17 | MF | (Russia) RUS | Aleksandr Golovin | 30 | 3 | 24+1 | 3 | 3 | 0 | 1+1 | 0 |
| 18 | DF | (France) FRA | Arthur Zagre | 3 | 0 | 0 | 0 | 1+1 | 0 | 0+1 | 0 |
| 20 | FW | (Algeria) ALG | Islam Slimani | 19 | 9 | 14+4 | 9 | 0 | 0 | 1 | 0 |
| 21 | MF | (Guinea) GUI | Adama Traoré | 2 | 0 | 0+2 | 0 | 0 | 0 | 0 | 0 |
| 22 | MF | (France) FRA | Youssouf Fofana | 7 | 0 | 7 | 0 | 0 | 0 | 0 | 0 |
| 24 | MF | (France) FRA | Aurélien Tchouaméni | 3 | 0 | 0+3 | 0 | 0 | 0 | 0 | 0 |
| 25 | DF | (Poland) POL | Kamil Glik | 24 | 1 | 23 | 1 | 1 | 0 | 0 | 0 |
| 28 | DF | (Brazil) BRA | Jorge | 2 | 0 | 0 | 0 | 2 | 0 | 0 | 0 |
| 32 | DF | (France) FRA | Benoît Badiashile | 20 | 0 | 16 | 0 | 2 | 0 | 2 | 0 |
| 34 | MF | (France) FRA | Moussa Sylla | 1 | 0 | 0+1 | 0 | 0 | 0 | 0 | 0 |
| 39 | DF | (Germany) GER | Benjamin Henrichs | 15 | 0 | 10+3 | 0 | 1 | 0 | 1 | 0 |
| 40 | GK | (France) FRA | Benjamin Lecomte | 32 | 0 | 28 | 0 | 3 | 0 | 1 | 0 |
Players away from the club on loan:
| 7 | FW | (Nigeria) NGR | Henry Onyekuru | 4 | 0 | 2+2 | 0 | 0 | 0 | 0 | 0 |
| 31 | MF | (Portugal) POR | Gil Dias | 16 | 0 | 10+4 | 0 | 1 | 0 | 0+1 | 0 |
| 35 | FW | (South Africa) RSA | Lyle Foster | 2 | 0 | 1+1 | 0 | 0 | 0 | 0 | 0 |
| 37 | DF | (England) ENG | Jonathan Panzo | 2 | 0 | 1+1 | 0 | 0 | 0 | 0 | 0 |
Players who appeared for Monaco no longer at the club:
| 7 | MF | (Portugal) POR | Rony Lopes | 1 | 0 | 1 | 0 | 0 | 0 | 0 | 0 |
| 22 | FW | (France) FRA | Jean-Kévin Augustin | 13 | 1 | 2+8 | 0 | 1 | 0 | 2 | 1 |
| 26 | MF | (Brazil) BRA | Boschilia | 6 | 0 | 1+4 | 0 | 0+1 | 0 | 0 | 0 |

=== Goalscorers ===
As of match played 7 March 2020

| Place | Position | Nation | Number | Name | Ligue 1 | Coupe de France | Coupe de la Ligue | Total |
|---|---|---|---|---|---|---|---|---|
| 1 | FW | (France) | 9 | Wissam Ben Yedder | 18 | 1 | 0 | 19 |
| 2 | FW | (Algeria) | 20 | Islam Slimani | 9 | 0 | 0 | 9 |
| 3 | FW | (Senegal) | 14 | Keita Baldé | 4 | 4 | 0 | 8 |
| 4 | FW | (Portugal) | 11 | Gelson Martins | 4 | 0 | 0 | 4 |
| 5 | MF | (Russia) | 17 | Aleksandr Golovin | 3 | 0 | 0 | 3 |
| 6 | FW | (Montenegro) | 10 | Stevan Jovetić | 2 | 0 | 0 | 2 |
| 6 | DF | (Chile) | 3 | Guillermo Maripán | 2 | 0 | 0 | 2 |
| 8 | DF | (Poland) | 25 | Kamil Glik | 1 | 0 | 0 | 1 |
| 8 | MF | (France) | 6 | Tiémoué Bakayoko | 1 | 0 | 0 | 1 |
| 8 | FW | (France) | 22 | Jean-Kévin Augustin | 0 | 0 | 1 | 1 |
| 8 | DF | (France) | 12 | Ruben Aguilar | 0 | 0 | 1 | 1 |
| | | | | TOTALS | 44 | 5 | 2 | 51 |

=== Clean sheets ===
As of match played 7 March 2020

| Place | Position | Nation | Number | Name | Ligue 1 | Coupe de France | Coupe de la Ligue | Total |
|---|---|---|---|---|---|---|---|---|
| 1 | FW | (France) | 40 | Benjamin Lecomte | 7 | 0 | 0 | 7 |
| | | | | TOTALS | 7 | 0 | 0 | 7 |

=== Disciplinary record ===
As of match played 7 March 2020

| N | P | Nat. | Name | Ligue 1 | | | Coupe de France | | | Coupe de la Ligue | | | Total | | | Notes |
| N | P | Nat. | Name | Yellow card | Second yellow card | Red card | Yellow card | Second yellow card | Red card | Yellow card | Second yellow card | Red card | Yellow card | Second yellow card | Red card | Notes |
| 1 | GK | (Croatia) | Danijel Subašić | 1 | | 1 | | | | | | | 1 | | 1 | |
| 2 | DF | (France) | Fodé Ballo-Touré | 4 | | | 1 | | | | | | 5 | | | |
| 3 | DF | (Chile) | Guillermo Maripán | 2 | | | | | | | | | 2 | | | |
| 4 | MF | (Spain) | Cesc Fàbregas | 1 | | 1 | | | | | | | 1 | | 1 | |
| 5 | DF | (Brazil) | Jemerson | 2 | | 1 | | | | 1 | | | 3 | | 1 | |
| 6 | MF | (France) | Tiémoué Bakayoko | 4 | | 1 | | | | | | | 4 | | 1 | |
| 8 | MF | (Portugal) | Adrien Silva | 7 | | | 1 | | | | | | 8 | | | |
| 9 | FW | (France) | Wissam Ben Yedder | 1 | | | 1 | | | | | | 2 | | | |
| 10 | FW | (Montenegro) | Stevan Jovetić | 2 | | 1 | | | | | | | 2 | | 1 | |
| 11 | MF | (Portugal) | Gelson Martins | 3 | | 1 | | | | | | | 3 | | 1 | |
| 12 | DF | (France) | Ruben Aguilar | 2 | | 2 | | | | | | | 2 | | 2 | |
| 14 | FW | (Senegal) | Keita Baldé | 4 | | | 1 | | | | | | 5 | | | |
| 16 | GK | (Switzerland) | Diego Benaglio | 1 | | | | | | | | | 1 | | | |
| 17 | MF | (Russia) | Aleksandr Golovin | 5 | 1 | | 1 | | | | | | 6 | 1 | | |
| 20 | FW | (Algeria) | Islam Slimani | 5 | 1 | | | | | | | | 5 | 1 | | |
| 22 | MF | (France) | Youssouf Fofana | 1 | | | | | | | | | 1 | | | |
| 24 | MF | (France) | Aurélien Tchouaméni | 3 | | | | | | | | | 3 | | | |
| 25 | DF | (Poland) | Kamil Glik | 5 | | | | | | | | | 5 | | | |
| 28 | DF | (Brazil) | Jorge | | | | 1 | | | | | | 1 | | | |
| 39 | DF | (Germany) | Benjamin Henrichs | 3 | | | | | | | | | 3 | | | |
| 40 | GK | (France) | Benjamin Lecomte | 1 | | | | | | | | | 1 | | | |
Players away on loan:
| 31 | MF | (Portugal) | Gil Dias | 3 | | | | | | | | | 3 | | | |

Source: Match reports in Competitive matches
Ordered by (red card) , (second yellow card) and (yellow card)
(yellow card) = Number of bookings; (second yellow card) = Number of sending offs after a second yellow card; (red card) = Number of sending offs by a direct red card.
