= Nordine Ibouroi =

Association football player (born 1998)

Personal information
- Date of birth: 30 July 1998 (age 28)
- Place of birth: Marseille, France
- Height: 1.70 m (5 ft 7 in)
- Position: Forward

Youth career
- 2014–2016: Cannes

Senior career*
Years	Team	Apps	(Gls)
2016–2017	Salon Bel Air		
2017–2018	Martigues	15	(1)
2018–2019	Auxerre B	19	(2)
2019–2020	Monaco B	16	(2)
2021	Bembibre	4	(0)

International career^{‡}
2017–	Comoros	6	(0)
- * Club domestic league appearances and goals ‡ National team caps and goals as of 20:40, 29 April 2022 (UTC)

Nordine Ibouroi (born 30 July 1998) is a professional footballer who plays as a forward. Born in France, he plays for the Comoros national team.

== Club career ==
In May 2018, Ibouroi joined Ligue 2 side Auxerre on an amateur contract.

== Career statistics ==
=== Club ===
As of match played 10 February 2021

Club	Season	League			National Cup		Other		Total	
Club	Season	Division	Apps	Goals	Apps	Goals	Apps	Goals	Apps	Goals
Martigues	2017–18	National 2	15	1	1 (Note: Appearances in the Coupe de France)	0	0	0	16	1
Auxerre B	2018–19	National 3	19	2	—		0	0	19	2
Monaco B	2019–20	National 2	16	2	—		0	0	16	2
Bembibre	2020–21	Tercera División	4	0	0	0	0	0	4	0
Career total			50	5	1	0	0	0	51	5

=== International ===
As of match played 9 November 2020.

National team	Year	Apps	Goals
Comoros	2017	1	0
Comoros	2018	1	0
Comoros	2019	4	0
Comoros	2020	0	0
Total		6	0
