= Patrick William =

Brazilian footballer

- Patrick Wiliam in 2026

Personal information
- Full name: Patrick William Sá de Oliveira
- Date of birth: 3 June 1997 (age 29)
- Place of birth: São Leopoldo, Brazil
- Height: 1.85 m (6 ft 1 in)
- Position: Centre-back

Team information
- Current team: Bucheon FC 1995
- Number: 3

Senior career*
Years	Team	Apps	(Gls)
2017–2018	Tupi	14	(1)
2018	Ceará	13	(1)
2018–2019	Vila Nova	12	(1)
2019–2022	Famalicão	41	(1)
2021–2022	→ Estoril (loan)	2	(0)
2022–2024	Rio Ave	59	(3)
2025	Kyoto Sanga	17	(0)
2026–	Bucheon FC 1995	15	(0)
- * Club domestic league appearances and goals as of 4 August 2026

Patrick William Sá de Oliveira (born 3 June 1997) is a Brazilian professional footballer who plays as a centre-back for K League 1 club Bucheon FC 1995.

== Professional career ==
Patrick William made his professional debut with Ceará in a 1–0 Campeonato Brasileiro Série A loss to Cruzeiro on 3 June 2018. On 25 June 2019, he signed a professional contract for 5 years with Famalicão in the Portuguese Primeira Liga.

On 17 August 2021, he joined Estoril on loan.

On 8 January 2025, Patrick William transferred to J1 League club Kyoto Sanga for the 2025 season.
