= Miguel Reisinho (footballer, born 1999) =

Portuguese footballer

Personal information
- Full name: Miguel Silva Reisinho
- Date of birth: 9 April 1999 (age 27)
- Height: 1.84 m (6 ft 1/2 in)
- Position: Midfielder

Youth career
- 2008–2010: Vila Meã
- 2010–2011: Penafiel
- 2011–2014: Paços de Ferreira
- 2014–2017: Vitória Guimarães

Senior career*
Years	Team	Apps	(Gls)
2017–2019	Vitória Guimarães B	23	(0)
2019–2025	Boavista	77	(8)
2025–2026	Mamelodi Sundowns	6	(1)

International career^{‡}
2017	Portugal U18	7	(0)
2017	Portugal U19	4	(0)
2019	Portugal U20	1	(0)
- * Club domestic league appearances and goals as of 18:08, 1 September 2026 (UTC) ‡ National team caps and goals as of 12 February 2020 (UTC)

Miguel Silva Reisinho (born 9 April 1999) is a Portuguese professional footballer who plays as a midfielder.

== Club career ==
Born on 9 April 1999 in Vila Nova de Gaia, Porto Metropolitan Area, Reisinho joined Vitória de Guimarães from F.C. Paços de Ferreira in 2014, and signed his first professional contract in June 2017. On 13 August, he made his professional debut with the reserve team in a 2017–18 LigaPro match against Oliveirense, a home goalless draw.

On 2 September 2019, Reisinho signed a three-year deal with Boavista of the Primeira Liga. His former club retained 60% of his economic rights and first preference on his next transfer. He made his top-flight debut on 6 December in a 4–1 home loss to leaders Benfica, as a 58th-minute substitute for Marlon Xavier.

In November 2020, Reisinho suffered a cruciate ligament break on his left knee. The following May, having not yet recovered, he signed a new contract until 2025. In October 2021, having played only 17 games in three years across all competitions, he picked up a training injury on the same ligaments. On 30 September 2023, he scored his first Primeira Liga goal in a 2–2 draw with Famalicão. On the final matchday of the 2023–24 season, he scored a penalty in the 11th minute of stoppage time in a 2–2 draw against Vizela, securing Boavista's continued presence in the Primeira Liga.

=== Mamelodi Sundowns ===
In September 2025 he signed for South African Premiership side Mamelodi Sundowns. Reisinho was sent off in his debut in the 2025 Carling Knockout Cup round of 16 match after just six minutes on the field.

== International career ==
From under-18 to under-20 level, Reisinho earned 12 caps for Portugal. His only appearance for the final one of those teams was on 30 January 2019, as a substitute in a 3–0 friendly win over Cape Verde in Covilhã.

== Personal life ==
Reisinho's father, also named Miguel, was a footballer who represented teams such as F.C. Penafiel and Paços de Ferreira.

== Career statistics ==
As of match played 18 May 2024

Appearances and goals by club, season and competition
Club	Season	League			National cup		League cup		Total	
Club	Season	Division	Apps	Goals	Apps	Goals	Apps	Goals	Apps	Goals
Vitória Guimarães B	2017–18	LigaPro	4	0	—		—		4	0
Vitória Guimarães B	2018–19	LigaPro	19	0	—		—		19	0
Vitória Guimarães B	Total		23	0	—		—		23	0
Boavista	2019–20	Primeira Liga	6	0	0	0	0	0	6	0
Boavista	2020–21	Primeira Liga	6	0	1	0	—		7	0
Boavista	2021–22	Primeira Liga	2	0	0	0	2	0	4	0
Boavista	2022–23	Primeira Liga	3	0	0	0	2	0	5	0
Boavista	2023–24	Primeira Liga	31	3	1	1	1	0	33	4
Boavista	2024–25	Primeira Liga	29	5	1	0	0	0	30	5
Boavista	Total		77	8	3	1	5	0	85	9
Career total			100	8	3	1	5	0	108	9
