= Cristian Devenish =

Colombian footballer (born 2001)

Personal information
- Full name: Cristian David Castro Devenish
- Date of birth: 25 January 2001 (age 25)
- Place of birth: Barranquilla, Colombia
- Height: 1.92 m (6 ft 4 in)
- Position: Centre-back

Team information
- Current team: Metz

Youth career
- 2011–2015: Deportivo Galapa
- 2015–2017: América de Cali
- 2017–2019: Atlético Nacional

Senior career*
Years	Team	Apps	(Gls)
2019–2024	Atlético Nacional	58	(1)
2019–2020	→ Vizela (loan)	1	(0)
2020–2021	→ Boavista (loan)	27	(1)
2024	→ Rio Ave (loan)	1	(0)
2024–2026	AVS	60	(1)
2026–	Metz	0	(0)

International career
2023	Colombia U23	4	(0)
- * Club domestic league appearances and goals as of 18 May 2026

Cristian David Castro Devenish (born 25 January 2001) is a Colombian professional footballer who plays as a centre-back for Ligue 2 club Metz.

== Playing career ==
Devenish began playing football at the age of 10 with his local club Deportivo Galapa, and then had stints at the academies of América de Cali and Atlético Nacional. After signing with Atlético Nacional, Devenish had a loan in Portugal with Vizela for the 2019–20 season, and on 28 August 2020 signed another loan with Boavista. Devenish made his professional debut with Boavista in a 1–0 Primeira Liga loss to Vitória S.C. on 19 October 2020.

On 31 January 2024, Devenish returned to Portugal, with Atlético Nacional loaning him to Primeira Liga side Rio Ave until the end of the 2023–24 season.
