= Mohamed Aidara (footballer, born 1996) =

Ivorian footballer

Personal information
- Date of birth: 6 November 1996 (age 30)
- Place of birth: Abidjan, Ivory Coast
- Height: 1.86 m (6 ft 1 in)
- Position: Centre-back

Team information
- Current team: Sporting da Covilhã
- Number: 45

Youth career
- ASEC Mimosas

Senior career*
Years	Team	Apps	(Gls)
2016–2017	ASEC Mimosas	22	(3)
2017–2023	Vizela	90	(4)
2023–2024	Al-Taraji	27	(0)
2024–2026	Académico Viseu	16	(0)
2026	Felgueiras	1	(0)
2026–	Sporting da Covilhã	4	(0)
- * Club domestic league appearances and goals as of 12 September 2026

Mohamed Aidara (born 6 November 1996) is an Ivorian professional footballer who plays as a centre-back for Liga 3 club Sporting da Covilhã.

== Career ==
Aidara began his senior career with the Ivorian club ASEC Mimosas, scoring 3 goals in 22 games in his debut season. He was transferred to Vizela on 19 July 2017. He helped Vizela achieve successive promotions from the Campeonato de Portugal to the Primeira Liga. He made his professional debut with Vizela in a 2–1 Segunda Liga win over Oliveirense on 12 September 2020.

On 5 July 2023, Aidara joined Saudi club Al-Taraji.

On 27 June 2024, Aidara joined Liga Portugal 2 club Académico Viseu. In January 2026, he moved to fellow second-division side Felgueiras.
