= Ricardo Mangas =

Portuguese footballer

Personal information
- Full name: Ricardo Luís Chaby Mangas
- Date of birth: 19 March 1998 (age 28)
- Place of birth: Olhão, Portugal
- Height: 1.79 m (5 ft 10 in)
- Position: Left-back

Team information
- Current team: Monza (on loan from Sporting CP)
- Number: 7

Youth career
- 2006–2008: Marítimo Olhanense
- 2008–2009: Ferreiras
- 2009–2010: CB Portimão
- 2010–2017: Benfica
- 2015–2016: → Tondela (loan)

Senior career*
Years	Team	Apps	(Gls)
2017–2020	Aves	20	(1)
2017–2018	→ Mirandela (loan)	25	(3)
2020–2023	Boavista	55	(8)
2021–2022	→ Bordeaux (loan)	29	(3)
2023–2024	Vitória Guimarães	27	(1)
2024–2025	Spartak Moscow	13	(2)
2025–	Sporting CP	15	(2)
2026–	→ Monza (loan)	9	(1)

International career
2013	Portugal U15	1	(0)
2013–2014	Portugal U16	8	(1)
2014–2015	Portugal U17	8	(0)
- * Club domestic league appearances and goals as of 15:06, 28 October 2026 (UTC)

Ricardo Luís Chaby Mangas (born 19 March 1998) is a Portuguese professional footballer who plays as a left-back for Serie A club Monza, on loan from Primeira Liga club Sporting CP.

== Club career ==
=== Aves ===
Born in Olhão on the Algarve, Mangas spent most of his development at Benfica. After leaving for Aves in 2017, he was immediately loaned out for the season to third-tier club Mirandela, where he made his senior debut.

Mangas made his professional debut in the Primeira Liga on 7 December 2019, playing the full 90 minutes for Aves in a 1–0 home win against Braga; he was watched by Atlético Madrid forward and Portugal international João Félix, his long-term teammate at Benfica. He played 20 games as the team from Vila das Aves were relegated in last place, scoring once to open the 2–1 away victory over Marítimo on 2 February 2020, and being sent off on 11 June in a 2–0 loss at fellow strugglers Tondela.

=== Boavista ===
Mangas returned to the top tier on 4 August 2020 on a four-year deal at Boavista. He scored on his debut on 19 September, in a 3–3 away draw against Nacional.

On 4 August 2021, Mangas joined Bordeaux on a one-year loan with a buying option. He made his Ligue 1 debut 11 days later in a 2–2 draw at Marseille, and scored his first goal on 12 September in a 3–2 home defeat to Lens. The team ended the season relegated for the first time in 30 years, with him averaging 4.1 out of 10 for his performances according to local newspaper Sud-Ouest.

=== Vitória Guimarães ===
On 4 July 2023, Mangas signed a three-year contract with Vitória de Guimarães for a reported fee of €1 million. He scored his first goal on 11 May 2024, but in a 2–3 home loss against Braga in the Minho derby.

On 1 August 2024, Mangas netted twice in the 4–0 home win over Malta's Floriana in the second qualifying round of the UEFA Conference League, his second goal coming through a bicycle kick. During his spell at the Estádio D. Afonso Henriques, he scored five times and provided eight assists from 38 appearances.

=== Spartak Moscow ===
On 10 September 2024, Mangas joined Spartak Moscow on a two-year deal, for €2 million plus 500.000 in add-ons; Vitória remained entitled to 15% of any future transfer. He made his Russian Premier League debut five days later, starting a 1–1 draw away to Dynamo Makhachkala. He scored his first goal in the next match, closing the 4–1 victory against Krylia Sovetov in the group stage of the Russian Cup.

=== Sporting CP ===
Mangas returned to Portugal on 7 August 2025, on a four-year contract at Sporting CP; it included a €60 million buyout clause, and he reunited with his former Mirandela and Vitória coach Rui Borges. On his first appearance as a starter, ten days later, he scored twice in a 6–0 home rout of Arouca.

On 24 July 2026, Mangas signed for Serie A club Monza on a one-year loan, with a conditional purchase obligation. He scored his first goal on 13 September, but in a 3–2 defeat away to Lecce.

== Career statistics ==
As of match played 28 October 2026

Appearances and goals by club, season and competition
Club	Season	League			National cup (Note: Includes Taça de Portugal, Coupe de France and Russian Cup)		League cup (Note: Includes Taça da Liga)		Continental		Total	
Club	Season	Division	Apps	Goals	Apps	Goals	Apps	Goals	Apps	Goals	Apps	Goals
Mirandela (loan)	2017–18	Campeonato de Portugal	25	3	0	0	—		—		25	3
Aves	2019–20	Primeira Liga	20	1	0	0	0	0	—		20	1
Boavista	2020–21	Primeira Liga	28	4	0	0	—		—		28	4
Boavista	2021–22	Primeira Liga	—		—		1	0	—		1	0
Boavista	2022–23	Primeira Liga	27	4	1	0	4	1	—		32	5
Boavista	Total		55	8	1	0	5	1	—		61	9
Bordeaux (loan)	2021–22	Ligue 1	29	3	1	0	—		—		30	3
Vitória Guimarães	2023–24	Primeira Liga	23	1	5	0	0	0	—		28	1
Vitória Guimarães	2024–25	Primeira Liga	4	0	—		—		6 (Note: Appearances in UEFA Conference League)	4	10	4
Vitória Guimarães	Total		27	1	5	0	0	0	6	4	38	5
Spartak Moscow	2024–25	Russian Premier League	11	2	6	1	—		—		17	3
Spartak Moscow	2025–26	Russian Premier League	2	0	0	0	—		—		2	0
Spartak Moscow	Total		13	2	6	1	—		—		19	3
Sporting CP	2025–26	Primeira Liga	15	2	5	0	1	0	2 (Note: Appearances in UEFA Champions League)	0	23	2
Monza (loan)	2026–27	Serie A	9	1	2	0	—		—		11	1
Career total			193	21	20	1	6	1	8	4	227	27

== Honours ==
Benfica

- UEFA Youth League runner-up: 2016–17
