= Jhonata Robert =

Brazilian footballer

Personal information
- Full name: Jhonata Robert Alves da Silva
- Date of birth: 26 October 1999 (age 27)
- Place of birth: Recife, Brazil
- Height: 1.79 m (5 ft 10 in)
- Positions: Winger; attacking midfielder

Team information
- Current team: Criciúma
- Number: 10

Youth career
- 2015–2019: Barra-SC
- 2017–2019: → Grêmio (loan)
- 2019: Grêmio

Senior career*
Years	Team	Apps	(Gls)
2019–2024	Grêmio	27	(4)
2020	→ Cruzeiro (loan)	7	(1)
2020–2021	→ Famalicão (loan)	22	(4)
2024–	Criciúma	60	(11)
- * Club domestic league appearances and goals as of 15 April 2026

Jhonata Robert Alves da Silva (born 26 October 1999), commonly known as Jhonata Robert, is a Brazilian professional footballer who plays as a winger or an attacking midfielder for Campeonato Brasileiro Série B club Criciúma.

== Club career ==
=== Grêmio ===
Born in Recife, Brazil, Jhonata Robert joined the Grêmio's Academy at the age of 17 in 2017 on loan from Barra-SC.

== Career statistics ==
=== Club ===
As of 27 February 2025.

Appearances and goals by club, season and competition
Club	Season	League			State League		National Cup		Continental		Other		Total	
Club	Season	Division	Apps	Goals	Apps	Goals	Apps	Goals	Apps	Goals	Apps	Goals	Apps	Goals
Grêmio	2019	Série A	1	0	0	0	—		—		—		1	0
Grêmio	2020	Série A	—		—		—		—		—		0	0
Grêmio	2021	Série A	12	2	—		4	0	0	0	—		15	1
Grêmio	Total		12	1	0	0	4	0	0	0	—		16	1
Cruzeiro (loan)	2020	Série B	0	0	5 (Note: Appearance(s) in Campeonato Mineiro.)	1	2	0	—		—		7	1
Famalicão (loan)	2020–21	Primeira Liga	20	4	—		2	0	—		—		22	4
Career total			32	5	5	1	8	0	0	0	0	0	45	6

== Honours ==
Grêmio

- Campeonato Gaúcho: 2021, 2022, 2023, 2024
- Recopa Gaúcha: 2021, 2022, 2023

Criciúma

Recopa catarinense 2025
