= Manuel Ugarte (footballer) =

Uruguayan footballer (born 2001)

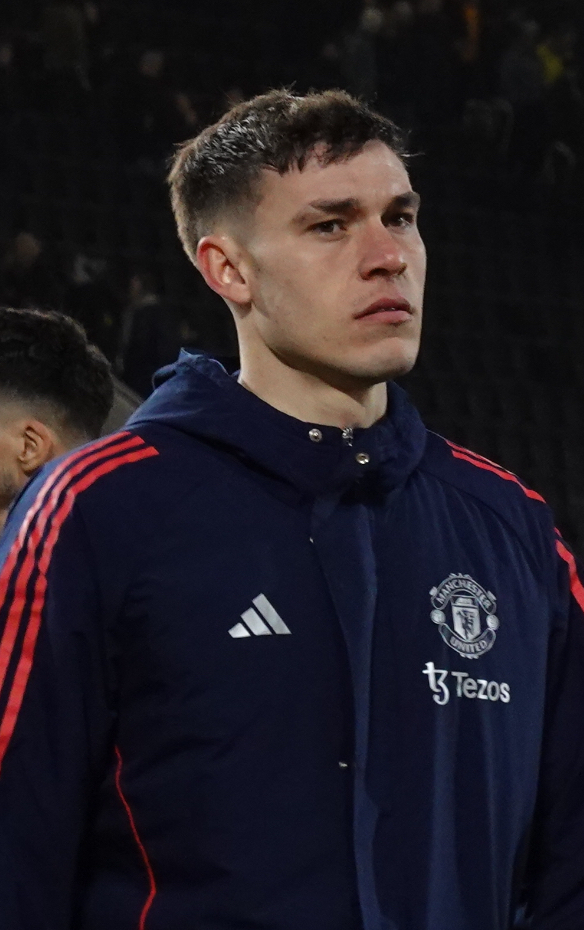
- Ugarte with Manchester United in 2025

Personal information
- Full name: Manuel Ugarte Ribeiro
- Date of birth: 11 April 2001 (age 25)
- Place of birth: Montevideo, Uruguay
- Height: 1.82 m (6 ft 0 in)
- Positions: Defensive midfielder; central midfielder

Team information
- Current team: Manchester United
- Number: 25

Youth career
- City Park
- –2016: Fénix

Senior career*
Years	Team	Apps	(Gls)
2016–2020	Fénix	53	(2)
2021	Famalicão	20	(1)
2021–2023	Sporting CP	56	(0)
2023–2024	Paris Saint-Germain	25	(0)
2024–	Manchester United	51	(1)

International career^{‡}
2018	Uruguay U20	5	(0)
2020	Uruguay U23	7	(1)
2021–	Uruguay	39	(1)
Medal record
Men's football
Representing Uruguay
Copa América
Third place	2024 United States
- * Club domestic league appearances and goals as of 21:16, 13 April 2026 (UTC) ‡ National team caps and goals as of 02:10, 27 June 2026 (UTC)

Manuel Ugarte Ribeiro (Spanish pronunciation: [maˈnwel uˈɣaɾte]; born 11 April 2001) is a Uruguayan professional footballer who plays as a defensive midfielder for Premier League club Manchester United and the Uruguay national team. Primarily a defensive midfielder, he can also be played as a central midfielder.

Ugarte came through Fénix's youth academy, being promoted to the first-team in 2016. In December 2021, he joined Portuguese Primeira Liga club Famalicão. Following an impressive half-season, Ugarte signed for fellow Primeira Liga club Sporting CP, winning the Taça da Liga in his time with the club. In July 2023, he joined Paris Saint-Germain for a transfer worth €60 million. In August 2024, he joined Manchester United for a fee of €50 million.

Ugarte is a former youth international for Uruguay, representing the country at under-20 and under-23 levels. He made his senior international debut in 2021. He represented Uruguay at the 2024 Copa América and was named in the Team of the Tournament.

== Club career ==
=== Fénix ===
Born in Montevideo, Ugarte started his football career in the youth ranks of local club City Park, before joining Fénix's youth setup, being promoted to the first-team at the age of 15 by manager Rosario Martínez. Shortly after, he was included in the 30-man to compete in the 2016 Copa Sudamericana.

Ugarte made his professional debut on 4 December 2016, replacing Agustín Canobbio in the 83rd minute in a 4–1 league win against Danubio. By doing so, he became the youngest ever player in the 21st century to play professionally in Uruguay (aged 15 years and 233 days). Initially Ugarte played as a striker, before being converted to a midfielder.

Under Juan Ramón Carrasco, Ugarte was entrusted to play more regularly, being named club captain aged 18 and scoring his first goal on 10 March 2019 in a 2–0 win against Racing Club, as he went on to make 14 appearances in the Uruguayan Primera División. On 29 October 2020, Ugarte assisted Luciano Nequecaur goal in the albivioletas 3–1 over Huachipato in the first leg of the 2020 Copa Sudamericana. Overall, he made 57 appearances for the club and scored one goal.

=== Famalicão ===
On 29 December 2020, Ugarte signed a five-year contract with Portuguese club Famalicão for a fee of €3 million for 80% of his economic rights. He made his Primeira Liga debut on 17 January 2021, playing the entire 2–0 victory at Santa Clara. On 21 February, he scored his first goal for the club in a 1–0 victory over Rio Ave. Despite initially not being a starter, Ugarte eventually earned a place in the team under manager Ivo Vieira, as his versatility enabled him to play in various positions in midfield, which was found useful by his coach, as Famalicão narrowly missed on European qualification to the Europa Conference League.

=== Sporting CP ===
On 9 August 2021, Ugarte signed a five-year contract with Sporting CP of the same league, for a fee of €6.5 million for half of his economic rights. On 14 August, he made his debut for the club, replacing João Palhinha in the 92nd minute in a 2–1 away win against Braga in the Primeira Liga. Ugarte scored his first goal for Sporting on 2 January 2022, opening the 2–1 home victory over his former club Famalicão. Initially signed as back-up to João Palhinha, following the latter's injury, Ugarte began having a run as starter, with manager Ruben Amorim entrusting him Palhinha's place on 3 December in the 3–1 away victory against rivals Benfica in the Lisbon derby. His impressive performances and quick adaptation to the team earned him praise from his manager, as he began to play more regularly and threaten Palhinha's starting position. In the 2022–23 UEFA Champions League group stage, Ugarte had the most tackles and interceptions combined at 34, including 12 tackles in a 3–0 away win against Eintracht Frankfurt.

=== Paris Saint-Germain ===
On 15 June 2023, in an interview with Portuguese newspaper Record, Ugarte confirmed that he would be joining Ligue 1 side Paris Saint-Germain. On 7 July 2023, PSG officially announced that he had joined the club on a five-year contract until 30 June 2028. The transfer fee was reported to be €60 million, with PSG triggering Ugarte's release clause. He made his debut in a 0–0 draw against Lorient at the Parc des Princes on 12 August.

In August 2023, Ugarte was one of three nominees for the UNFP Player of the Month award. In his first four Ligue 1 matches, he registered 41 ball recoveries, the most in the league. The only player bettering Ugarte's statistic after the first four Ligue 1 matches of the season since the 2006–07 season was former PSG midfielder Thiago Motta with 47 ball recoveries. For his performances in August and September, Ugarte was described as a "revelation" of PSG's early season by Le Parisien and L'Équipe. However, after the first two months of the season, Ugarte progressively lost his place as a starter. It was reported in the media that manager Luis Enrique deemed that he did not correspond to his style of play. Ugarte would make frequent appearances as a substitute for the rest of the season, amid occasional starts. PSG went on to complete a domestic treble by winning Ligue 1, the Coupe de France, and the Trophée des Champions.

=== Manchester United ===
Ugarte signed for Premier League side Manchester United on 30 August 2024, signing a five-year contract with an option for a year extension. The transfer fee was reported to be €50 million, potentially increasing to €60 million with add-ons. He made his debut for United on 14 September, appearing for 17 minutes in a 3–0 win over Southampton.

On 22 February 2025, Ugarte scored his first goal for Manchester United, an equaliser after coming from 2–0 down, helping his team draw 2–2 with Everton in United's final match at Goodison Park.

On 17 April 2025, Ugarte netted the opening goal in the Europa League quarter-final second-leg against Lyon, with United eventually progressing after a dramatic 7–6 victory on aggregate.

== International career ==
=== Youth ===
Ugarte earned five caps for Uruguay at under-20 level. On 29 December 2019, Uruguay under-23 team head coach Gustavo Ferreyra named Ugarte in the 23-man final squad for the 2020 CONMEBOL Pre-Olympic Tournament. He made five appearances in the competition, scoring in a 1–1 draw against Brazil in the final stage that helped Uruguay to finish third place.

=== Senior ===
On 5 March 2021, Ugarte was named in Uruguay senior team's 35-man preliminary squad for 2022 FIFA World Cup qualifying matches against Argentina and Bolivia. However, CONMEBOL suspended those matches the next day amid concern over the COVID-19 pandemic. He made his senior team debut on 5 September 2021, by coming on as a 70th-minute substitute for Matías Vecino in a 4–2 win against Bolivia.

On 15 November 2024, Ugarte scored his first senior international goal, scoring in the 90+11th minute in 2026 World Cup qualifying against Colombia, the latest scored winning goal in the CONMEBOL World Cup qualifying history.

On 31 May 2026, Ugarte was named in Uruguay's 26-man squad for the 2026 FIFA World Cup. A month later, on 27 June, he suffered an ACL injury during the third group-stage World Cup match against Spain, which sidelined him for several months.

== Style of play ==
Ugarte is a combative defensive midfielder. His strengths include his ability to win back possession with well timed tackles and defensive positioning. During the 2023–24 Ligue 1 season, he topped the charts for the most tackles, 98, despite playing only 25 league games out of a possible 34 league games as compared to other players.

== Career statistics ==
=== Club ===
As of match played 13 April 2026

Appearances and goals by club, season and competition
Club	Season	League			National cup (Note: Includes Taça de Portugal, Coupe de France, FA Cup)		League cup (Note: Includes Taça da Liga, EFL Cup)		Continental		Other		Total	
Club	Season	Division	Apps	Goals	Apps	Goals	Apps	Goals	Apps	Goals	Apps	Goals	Apps	Goals
Fénix	2016	Uruguayan Primera División	1	0	—		—		—		—		1	0
Fénix	2017	Uruguayan Primera División	0	0	—		—		—		—		0	0
Fénix	2018	Uruguayan Primera División	1	0	—		—		—		—		1	0
Fénix	2019	Uruguayan Primera División	35	1	—		—		—		—		35	1
Fénix	2020	Uruguayan Primera División	16	1	—		—		4 (Note: Appearances in Copa Sudamericana)	0	—		20	1
Fénix	Total		53	2	—		—		4	0	—		57	2
Famalicão	2020–21	Primeira Liga	20	1	0	0	—		—		—		20	1
Famalicão	2021–22	Primeira Liga	0	0	—		1	0	—		—		1	0
Famalicão	Total		20	1	0	0	1	0	—		—		21	1
Sporting CP	2021–22	Primeira Liga	25	0	5	0	4	1	4 (Note: Appearances in UEFA Champions League)	0	—		38	1
Sporting CP	2022–23	Primeira Liga	31	0	1	0	5	0	10 (Note: Six appearances in UEFA Champions League, four appearances in UEFA Europa League)	0	—		47	0
Sporting CP	Total		56	0	6	0	9	1	14	0	—		85	1
Paris Saint-Germain	2023–24	Ligue 1	25	0	4	0	—		8	0	0	0	37	0
Manchester United	2024–25	Premier League	29	1	3	0	3	0	10 (Note: Appearances in UEFA Europa League)	1	—		45	2
Manchester United	2025–26	Premier League	22	0	1	0	1	0	—		—		24	0
Manchester United	2026–27	Premier League	0	0	0	0	0	0	0	0	—		0	0
Manchester United	Total		51	1	4	0	4	0	10	1	—		69	2
Career total			205	4	14	0	14	1	36	1	0	0	269	6

=== International ===
As of match played 26 June 2026

Appearances and goals by national team and year
National team	Year	Apps	Goals
Uruguay	2021	1	0
Uruguay	2022	5	0
Uruguay	2023	7	0
Uruguay	2024	15 (Note: Includes a non-FIFA friendly played against the Basque Country on 23 March 2024, which is counted as an official match by the Uruguayan Football Association)	1
Uruguay	2025	6	0
Uruguay	2026	5	0
Total		39	1

As of match played 26 June 2026
Scores and results list Uruguay's goal tally first, score column indicates score after each Ugarte goal.

International goals by date, venue, cap, opponent, score, result and competition
No.	Date	Venue	Cap	Opponent	Score	Result	Competition
1	15 November 2024	Estadio Centenario, Montevideo, Uruguay	27	Colombia	3–2	3–2	2026 World Cup qualification

== Honours ==
Sporting CP

- Taça da Liga: 2021–22

Paris Saint-Germain

- Ligue 1: 2023–24
- Coupe de France: 2023–24
- Trophée des Champions: 2023

Manchester United

- UEFA Europa League runner-up: 2024–25

Uruguay

- Copa América third place: 2024

Individual

- Uruguayan Primera División Team of the Year: 2019
- Primeira Liga Team of the Year: 2022–23
- Copa América Team of the Tournament: 2024
