= Miguel Reisinho (footballer, born 1975) =

Portuguese footballer

Personal information
- Full name: Miguel Antonio Oliveira Reisinho
- Date of birth: 6 June 1975 (age 51)
- Place of birth: Vila Nova de Gaia, Portugal
- Height: 1.77 m (5 ft 10 in)
- Position: Midfielder

Youth career
- 1988–1993: Porto

Senior career*
Years	Team	Apps	(Gls)
1993–1996	Penafiel	26	(1)
1994	→ Felgueiras (loan)	1	(0)
1995	→ Leça (loan)	4	(0)
1996–1998	Marco	52	(4)
1998–2000	Paços de Ferreira	46	(9)
2000–2001	Marco	9	(1)
2001–2002	Plymouth Argyle	0	(0)
2002–2003	Gondomar	4	(0)
2003–2006	Vila Meã		
2006–2007	Progrès Niederkorn	19	(0)
2007–2008	Avenir Beggen	22	(3)
2008–2009	Young Boys Diekirch		
2009–2012	Kayl-Tétange		

International career
	Portugal U16	15	(0)
	Portugal U17	3	(1)
- * Club domestic league appearances and goals

Miguel António Oliveira Reisinho (born 6 June 1975) is a Portuguese former professional footballer who played as a midfielder.

Reisinho began his career with Primeira Liga club Porto in 1988. He made his first team debut in 1993 after joining Liga de Honra side Penafiel. He had short-term loan spells with Felgueiras and Primeira Liga club Leça before joining Segunda Divisão side Marco in 1996. He spent two years with Marco and two more in Liga de Honra with Paços de Ferreira. After a brief return to Marco in 2000, Reisinho joined English Football League club Plymouth Argyle in 2001. He returned to Portugal the following year, where he played for Gondomar and Vila Meã.

He moved to Luxembourg in 2006 to play for Progrès Niederkorn and then moved to Avenir Beggen a year later. Reisinho dropped down a division in 2008, spending a season with Young Boys Diekirch before joining Union 05. While a youth team player with Porto, he was capped by Portugal at youth level. Reisinho made 15 appearances for the under-16 team and three for the under-17 team.

== Career ==
Reisinho was born in Vila Nova de Gaia. He began his career in 1988 when he signed a youth contract with Primeira Liga club Porto. Over the next five years, he progressed through their youth team and was capped at international level for Portugal. He played 15 times for the under-16's and three times for the under-17's, scoring one goal. He moved to Penafiel of Liga de Honra in 1993, where he made his first team debut. He made 20 appearances in his first season with the club before joining Felgueiras on loan in 1994. The following year, he moved to Leça on loan and made four appearances in the Primeira Liga before finishing the season back with Penafiel. Reisinho was transferred to Marco in 1996 and played for another two years in Liga de Honra, scoring four goals in 52 appearances. He joined another Liga de Honra club in 1998, Paços de Ferreira, and made 46 appearances over the next two seasons, scoring nine times. He returned to Marco for the 2000–01 season, scoring one goal in nine appearances, and then travelled to England for a trial with Football League club Plymouth Argyle.

He joined the club on their pre-season tour of Scotland and scored in a 3–0 win against Forfar Athletic. "We had Reisinho playing on the right-side of midfield, which is not his position, but even then he showed he has got things about him," said manager Paul Sturrock. "He wants to take people on and has got great awareness." He signed a six-month contract with the club in August 2001. He returned to Portugal in 2002 to play for Gondomar before spending three seasons with Vila Meã. In 2006, Reisinho joined Luxembourg National Division club Progrès Niederkorn, making 19 appearances in the 2006–07 season. He then moved to Avenir Beggen, where he scored three goals in his one season with the club. In 2008, he dropped down to the Division of Honour to play for Young Boys Diekirch before joining Kayl-Tétange the following year.

== Personal life ==
His son Miguel Silva Reisinho is now a footballer as well.

== Career statistics ==
Appearances and goals by club, season and competition
Club	Season	League	
Club	Season	Apps	Goals
Penafiel	1993–94	20	1
Penafiel	1994–95	0	0
Penafiel	1995–96	6	0
Penafiel	Total	26	1
Felgueiras	1994–95	1	0
Leça	1995–96	4	0
Marco	1996–97	22	0
Marco	1997–98	30	4
Marco	Total	52	4
Paços de Ferreira	1998–99	25	7
Paços de Ferreira	1999–00	21	2
Paços de Ferreira	Total	46	9
Marco	2000–01	9	1
Plymouth Argyle	2001–02	0	0
Gondomar	2002–03	4	0
Vila Meã	2003–04	—	—
Vila Meã	2004–05	—	—
Vila Meã	2005–06	—	—
Vila Meã	Total	—	—
Progrès Niederkorn	2006–07	19	0
Avenir Beggen	2007–08	22	3
Young Boys Diekirch	2008–09	—	—
Kayl-Tétange	2009–10	16	2
Career total		199	20

== Honours ==
Kayl-Tétange

- Division of Honour: 2010–11
