= Gil Dias =

Portuguese footballer (born 1996)

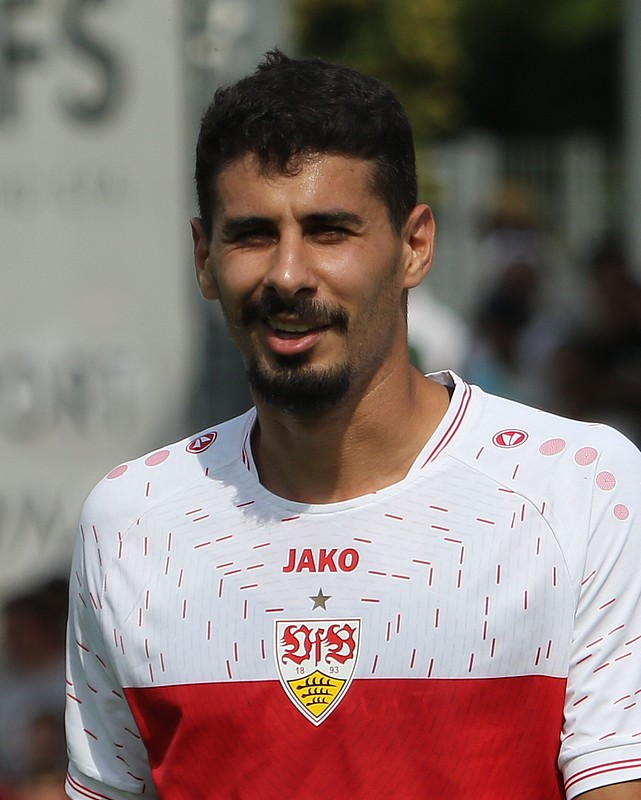
- Dias with VfB Stuttgart in 2023

Personal information
- Full name: Gil Bastião Dias
- Date of birth: 28 September 1996 (age 30)
- Place of birth: Gafanha da Nazaré, Portugal
- Height: 1.83 m (6 ft 0 in)
- Positions: Winger; left-back

Team information
- Current team: Famalicão
- Number: 23

Youth career
- 2004–2007: Gafanha
- 2007−2008: Sporting CP
- 2008–2013: Sanjoanense
- 2013–2014: Braga

Senior career*
Years	Team	Apps	(Gls)
2014–2015	Braga B	2	(0)
2015	Monaco B	24	(9)
2015–2021	Monaco	15	(0)
2016	→ Varzim (loan)	15	(6)
2016–2017	→ Rio Ave (loan)	34	(6)
2017–2018	→ Fiorentina (loan)	27	(2)
2018–2019	→ Nottingham Forest (loan)	21	(0)
2019	→ Olympiacos (loan)	7	(0)
2020	→ Granada (loan)	12	(0)
2020–2021	→ Famalicão (loan)	31	(0)
2021–2023	Benfica	12	(1)
2023–2024	VfB Stuttgart	7	(1)
2023–2024	→ Legia Warsaw (loan)	17	(0)
2023–2024	→ Legia Warsaw II (loan)	3	(1)
2024–	Famalicão	66	(9)

International career
2014	Portugal U18	5	(1)
2014−2015	Portugal U19	9	(3)
2016	Portugal U20	2	(0)
2017−2018	Portugal U21	10	(2)
- * Club domestic league appearances and goals as of 19:53, 23 August 2026 (UTC)

Gil Bastião Dias (born 28 September 1996) is a Portuguese professional footballer who plays as a winger or a left-back for Primeira Liga club Famalicão.

== Club career ==
=== Early years ===
Born in Gafanha da Nazaré, Aveiro District, Dias played youth football with four clubs, including A.D. Sanjoanense from ages 12 to 17. He finished his development with S.C. Braga and, on 9 August 2014, played his first game as a professional with their reserves, coming on as a late substitute in a 1–0 away loss against C.D. Tondela in the Segunda Liga.

=== Monaco ===
Dias signed with AS Monaco FC in January 2015, going on to appear mostly for the reserve team during his tenure. On 6 January 2016, he was loaned out to Portuguese second division side Varzim S.C. until the end of the season.

For the 2016–17 campaign, still owned by Monaco, Dias joined Rio Ave FC. He made his Primeira Liga debut on 12 August 2016 in a 3–1 home loss against FC Porto, and scored his first goal in the competition on 18 September to help the hosts defeat Sporting CP 3–1.

Dias made his first appearance in Ligue 1 on 13 August 2017, when he came onto the field for the last minutes of the 4–1 away win over Dijon FCO. Two days later, he moved to ACF Fiorentina of the Serie A on a two-year loan deal with an obligation to buy at the end of the term.

On 23 June 2018, it was announced that Dias would join EFL Championship side Nottingham Forest on loan for the season, with an option to make the transfer permanent. He scored his first competitive goal on 29 August, helping the hosts beat Premier League club Newcastle United 3–1 in the second round of the EFL Cup.

On 24 January 2019, Dias moved to Super League Greece team Olympiacos F.C. on loan until 30 June 2020, with the option to make the transfer permanent afterwards. He scored his first goal on 6 February, netting from close range in a 3–3 away draw against PAS Lamia 1964 in the quarter-finals of the domestic cup. Eight days later, in the UEFA Europa League's last-32 tie at home to FC Dynamo Kyiv, he chested the ball down before sending a half-volley past Denys Boyko from 25 yards for a final 2–2 draw.

Dias signed for La Liga club Granada CF on 31 January 2020, also in a temporary deal. In late September, he joined F.C. Famalicão on yet another loan.

=== Benfica ===
On 25 June 2021, Dias signed a five-year contract with S.L. Benfica for a €4 million fee. Mainly a reserve player, he scored his first goal on 17 April 2022 in a 2–0 victory at Sporting in the Lisbon derby, in injury time.

In the first part of the 2022–23 campaign, Dias made only two appearances as a substitute.

=== VfB Stuttgart ===
Dias joined Bundesliga club VfB Stuttgart on 30 January 2023, for roughly €1 million. He scored on his debut the following day, equalising an eventual 2–1 away win over SC Paderborn 07 in the round of 16 of the DFB-Pokal. His only goal in the league came on 18 February, when he opened the 3–0 home defeat of 1. FC Köln.

On 4 September 2023, Dias was loaned to Legia Warsaw in the Polish Ekstraklasa, with an option to buy.

=== Famalicão ===
Dias returned to Famalicão in July 2024, on a permanent three-year deal.

== International career ==
Dias won his first cap for the Portugal under-21 side on 5 September 2017, in a 2–0 home win against Wales in the 2019 UEFA European Championship qualifiers. The following 27 March, for the same competition but this time as a substitute, he contributed one goal to the 4–2 victory in Switzerland.

== Career statistics ==
As of match played 13 April 2024

Appearances and goals by club, season and competition
Club	Season	League			National cup (Note: Includes Coppa Italia, Greek Football Cup, Coupe de France, Taça de Portugal, DFB-Pokal and Polish Cup)		League cup (Note: Includes Taça da Liga, EFL Cup and Coupe de la Ligue)		Continental		Total	
Club	Season	Division	Apps	Goals	Apps	Goals	Apps	Goals	Apps	Goals	Apps	Goals
Braga B	2014–15	Segunda Liga	2	0	—		—		—		2	0
Monaco B	2014–15	CFA	11	0	—		—		—		11	0
Monaco B	2015–16	CFA	13	9	—		—		—		13	9
Monaco B	Total		24	9	—		—		—		24	9
Monaco	2017–18	Ligue 1	1	0	0	0	0	0	0	0	1	0
Monaco	2019–20	Ligue 1	14	0	1	0	1	0	—		16	0
Monaco	Total		15	0	1	0	1	0	0	0	17	0
Varzim (loan)	2015–16	LigaPro	15	6	0	0	0	0	—		15	6
Rio Ave (loan)	2016–17	Primeira Liga	34	6	1	0	2	2	2 (Note: Appearances in UEFA Europa League)	0	39	8
Fiorentina (loan)	2017–18	Serie A	27	2	1	0	—		—		28	2
Nottingham Forest (loan)	2018–19	Championship	21	0	0	0	3	1	—		24	1
Olympiacos (loan)	2018–19	Super League Greece	7	0	1	1	0	0	2	1	10	2
Granada (loan)	2019–20	La Liga	12	0	1	0	—		—		13	0
Famalicão (loan)	2020–21	Primeira Liga	31	0	2	2	0	0	—		33	2
Benfica	2021–22	Primeira Liga	12	1	1	0	3	0	2 (Note: Appearances in UEFA Champions League)	0	18	1
Benfica	2022–23	Primeira Liga	0	0	1	0	1	0	0	0	2	0
Benfica	Total		12	1	2	0	4	0	2	0	20	1
VfB Stuttgart	2022–23	Bundesliga	7	1	1	1	—		—		8	2
Legia Warsaw (loan)	2023–24	Ekstraklasa	17	0	2	0	—		5 (Note: Appearances in UEFA Europa Conference League)	0	24	0
Legia Warsaw II (loan)	2023–24	III liga, gr. I	3	1	0	0	—		—		3	1
Career total			227	26	12	4	10	3	11	1	260	34
