= Jorge Pereira =

Portuguese footballer (born 1998)

Personal information
- Full name: Jorge Javier Moreira Pereira
- Date of birth: 10 June 1998 (age 28)
- Place of birth: Caracas, Venezuela
- Height: 1.76 m (5 ft 9 in)
- Position: Defensive midfielder

Team information
- Current team: Petro de Luanda
- Number: 20

Youth career
- 2006–2008: Sanjoanense
- 2008–2009: Casa do Benfica de Estarreja
- 2009–2017: Benfica

Senior career*
Years	Team	Apps	(Gls)
2017–2021	Famalicão	3	(0)
2018–2019	→ AD Oliveirense (loan)	22	(0)
2021–2023	Sanjoanense	55	(0)
2023–2025	Feirense	59	(1)
2025–	Petro de Luanda	0	(0)

International career^{‡}
2013–2014	Portugal U16	6	(0)
2014–2015	Portugal U17	14	(0)
2015	Portugal U18	2	(0)
- * Club domestic league appearances and goals as of 4 June 2025 ‡ National team caps and goals as of 27 December 2020

Jorge Javier Moreira Pereira (born 10 March 1998) is a professional footballer who plays as a defensive midfielder for Angolan club Petro de Luanda. Born in Venezuela, Pereira represents Portugal internationally.

== Football career ==
On 21 December 2017, Pereira made his professional debut with Famalicão in a 2017–18 LigaPro match against FC Porto B.
