= Yanis Hamache =

Algerian footballer (born 1999)

Personal information
- Full name: Yanis Hamache
- Date of birth: 13 July 1999 (age 27)
- Place of birth: Marseille, France
- Height: 1.77 m (5 ft 10 in)
- Position: Left-back

Team information
- Current team: TBD

Youth career
- 2007–2008: Olympique Rovenain
- 2008–2014: Bel Air
- 2014–2016: Nice

Senior career*
Years	Team	Apps	(Gls)
2016–2020	Nice II	34	(8)
2019–2020	→ Red Star (loan)	21	(1)
2020–2022	Boavista	52	(6)
2022–2023	Dnipro-1	11	(2)
2024	Arouca	2	(0)
2024	MC Oran	0	(0)

International career^{‡}
2022	Algeria	1	(0)
- * Club domestic league appearances and goals as of 29 July 2024 ‡ National team caps and goals as of 9 September 2022 (UTC)

Yanis Hamache (Arabic: يانيس حماش; born 13 July 1999) is a professional footballer who plays as a left-back. Born in France, he plays for the Algeria national team.

== Career ==
A youth product of Nice, Hamache joined Red Star on loan for the 2019–20 season in the Championnat National. On 31 July 2020, Hamache signed a professional contract with Boavista for three years. Hamache made his professional debut with Boavista in a 1–0 Primeira Liga loss to Vitória S.C. on 19 October 2020.

On 1 September 2022, Hamache signed a four-year contract with Ukrainian Premier League club Dnipro-1, for a fee reported to be around €500.000. In the summer of 2023, he unilaterally terminated his contract with the club.

On 1 January 2024, Hamache returned to Portugal, signing a two-and-a-half-year contract with Primeira Liga club Arouca.

On 18 July 2024, he signed for Algerian Ligue Professionnelle 1 club MC Oran for two years, but he never play any match due to injury. He was eventually released before the end of his contract on 5 January 2025.

== International career ==
Born in France, Hamache holds French and Algerian nationalities. He was called up to the Algeria national team in May 2022. He debuted with Algeria in a 2–1 friendly win over Iran on 7 June 2022.
