= 2024–25 UEFA Conference League league phase =

International football club competition in Europe

The 2024–25 UEFA Conference League league phase began on 2 October and ended on 19 December 2024. A total of 36 teams competed in the league phase to decide the 24 places in the knockout phase of the 2024–25 UEFA Conference League.

Borac Banja Luka, Celje, Cercle Brugge, 1. FC Heidenheim, Jagiellonia Białystok, Larne, Noah, Pafos, Petrocub Hîncești, The New Saints and Víkingur Reykjavík made their debut appearances in a major UEFA competition group or league phase. Noah became the first club in Conference League history to successfully navigate all four rounds of qualification, while The New Saints and Larne were the first teams from Wales and Northern Ireland associations, respectively, to play in a major UEFA competition group or league stage. (Note: Wales-based Swansea City, who play in the English football league system, had previously qualified for the 2013–14 UEFA Europa League group stage, but only did so by winning the Football League Cup to qualify via one of England's berths. England-based The New Saints play in the Welsh football league system and qualified via one of Wales' berths.) A total of 29 national associations were represented in the league phase.

This was the first season with the single-league format, which replaced the group format used until the previous season. With the format change, the number of matches prior to the knockout phase increased from 96 to 108. Vitória de Guimarães' Samu was the first-ever goalscorer of the competition's league phase.

== Format ==
Each team played six matches, three at home and three away, against six different opponents, with all 36 teams ranked in a single league table. Teams were separated into six pots based on their 2024 UEFA club coefficients, and each team played one team from each of the six pots. The top eight ranked teams received a bye to the round of 16. The teams ranked from 9th to 24th contested the knockout phase play-offs, with the teams ranked from 9th to 16th seeded for the draw. Teams ranked from 25th to 36th were eliminated from the competition.

=== Tiebreakers ===
Teams were ranked according to points (3 points for a win, 1 point for a draw, 0 points for a loss). If two or more teams were equal on points upon completion of the league phase, the following tiebreaking criteria were applied, in the order given, to determine their rankings:

1. Goal difference;
2. Goals scored;
3. Away goals scored;
4. Wins;
5. Away wins;
6. Higher number of points obtained collectively by league phase opponents;
7. Superior collective goal difference of league phase opponents;
8. Higher number of goals scored collectively by league phase opponents;
9. Lower disciplinary points total (direct red card = 3 points, yellow card = 1 point, expulsion for two yellow cards in one match = 3 points);
10. UEFA club coefficient.

During the league phase, criteria 1 to 5 were used to rank teams who had equal number of points. If any teams were equal on points and tied on the first five criteria, they were considered equal in position and sorted alphabetically. Criteria 6 to 10 were only used to break ties upon completion of all matches.

== Teams and seeding ==
The 36 teams were divided into six pots of six teams each, with teams allocated to pots based on their 2024 UEFA club coefficients. The participants included:

- 24 winners of the play-off round (5 from the Champions Path, 19 from the Main Path)
- 12 losers of the Europa League play-off round

Key to colours
Teams ranked 1 to 8 advanced to the round of 16 as a seeded team
Teams ranked 9 to 16 advanced to the knockout phase play-offs as a seeded team
Teams ranked 17 to 24 advanced to the knockout phase play-offs as an unseeded team

Pot 1
Team	Notes	Coeff.
(The Football Association) Chelsea		96.000
(Danish Football Association) Copenhagen		51.500
(Royal Belgian Football Association) Gent		45.000
(Italian Football Federation) Fiorentina		42.000
(Austrian Football Association) LASK		37.000
(Royal Spanish Football Federation) Real Betis		33.000

Pot 4
Team	Notes	Coeff.
(Royal Belgian Football Association) Cercle Brugge		9.760
(Football Association of Ireland) Shamrock Rovers		9.500
(Football Association of Wales) The New Saints		8.500
(Swiss Football Association) Lugano		8.000
(Scottish Football Association) Heart of Midlothian		7.210
(Football Association of the Czech Republic) Mladá Boleslav		7.210

Pot 2
Team	Notes	Coeff.
(Turkish Football Federation) İstanbul Başakşehir		29.000
(Norwegian Football Federation) Molde		28.500
(Polish Football Association) Legia Warsaw		18.000
(German Football Association) 1. FC Heidenheim		17.324
(Swedish Football Association) Djurgårdens IF		16.500
(Cyprus Football Association) APOEL		14.500

Pot 5
Team	Notes	Coeff.
(Moldovan Football Federation) Petrocub Hîncești		7.000
(Swiss Football Association) St. Gallen		6.595
(Hellenic Football Federation) Panathinaikos		6.305
(Football Association of Serbia) TSC		5.555
(Football Association of Bosnia and Herzegovina) Borac Banja Luka		5.500
(Polish Football Association) Jagiellonia Białystok		5.075

Pot 3
Team	Notes	Coeff.
(Austrian Football Association) Rapid Wien		14.000
(Cyprus Football Association) Omonia		12.000
(Football Association of Finland) HJK		11.500
(Portuguese Football Federation) Vitória de Guimarães		11.263
(Kazakhstan Football Federation) Astana		11.000
(Football Association of Slovenia) Olimpija Ljubljana		10.500

Pot 6
Team	Notes	Coeff.
(Football Association of Slovenia) Celje		4.500
(Irish Football Association) Larne		4.500
(Football Federation of Belarus) Dinamo Minsk		4.500
(Cyprus Football Association) Pafos		4.420
(Football Association of Iceland) Víkingur Reykjavík		4.000
(Football Federation of Armenia) Noah		2.125

Notes

1. ^{ECL-CP} Winners of play-off round (Champions Path)
2. ^{ECL-MP} Winners of play-off round (Main Path)
3. ^{EL-PO} Losers of Europa League play-off round

== Draw ==
The draw for the league phase pairings was held at the Grimaldi Forum in Monaco on 30 August 2024, 14:30 CEST. All 36 teams were manually drawn using physical balls. For every team manually drawn, automated software digitally drew their opponents at random, determining which of their matches were at home and which ones were away. Each team faced one opponent from each of the six pots, three of which they faced at home and three away. For the purposes of determining match venues, adjacent pots were paired (Pot 1 with 2, 3 with 4, and 5 with 6) so that, for each pot pairing, teams faced one opponent at home and one away. Teams could not face opponents from their own association, and could only be drawn against a maximum of two sides from the same association. The draw started with Pot 1, assigning opponents to all teams, one after the other, and continued with the other pots in ascending order until all teams were assigned their opponents.

The switch to a primarily computer-based draw was made due to issues with the complexity and duration required by a manual draw. The draw software, developed by AE Live, guaranteed total randomness within the framework of the draw conditions and prevented any deadlock situations. The software was reviewed by external auditor Ernst & Young, which also provided review and control of the manual and digital draw operations on-site.

The venue for each club's fixtures is shown in brackets below (H: home; A: away).

League phase opponents by club
Club	Pot 1 opponent		Pot 2 opponent		Pot 3 opponent		Pot 4 opponent		Pot 5 opponent		Pot 6 opponent		Avg coeff.
(The Football Association) Chelsea	Gent	(H)	1. FC Heidenheim	(A)	Astana	(A)	Shamrock Rovers	(H)	Panathinaikos	(A)	Noah	(H)	15.2
(Danish Football Association) Copenhagen	Real Betis	(A)	İstanbul Başakşehir	(H)	Rapid Wien	(A)	Heart of Midlothian	(H)	Jagiellonia Białystok	(H)	Dinamo Minsk	(A)	15.5
(Royal Belgian Football Association) Gent	Chelsea	(A)	Molde	(H)	Omonia	(H)	Lugano	(A)	TSC	(H)	Larne	(A)	25.8
(Italian Football Federation) Fiorentina	LASK	(H)	APOEL	(A)	Vitória de Guimarães	(A)	The New Saints	(H)	St. Gallen	(A)	Pafos	(H)	13.7
(Austrian Football Association) LASK	Fiorentina	(A)	Djurgårdens IF	(H)	Olimpija Ljubljana	(A)	Cercle Brugge	(H)	Borac Banja Luka	(A)	Víkingur Reykjavík	(H)	14.7
(Royal Spanish Football Federation) Real Betis	Copenhagen	(H)	Legia Warsaw	(A)	HJK	(H)	Mladá Boleslav	(A)	Petrocub Hîncești	(A)	Celje	(H)	16.6
(Turkish Football Federation) İstanbul Başakşehir	Copenhagen	(A)	1. FC Heidenheim	(H)	Rapid Wien	(H)	Cercle Brugge	(A)	Petrocub Hîncești	(H)	Celje	(A)	17.3
(Norwegian Football Federation) Molde	Gent	(A)	APOEL	(H)	HJK	(A)	Mladá Boleslav	(H)	Jagiellonia Białystok	(A)	Larne	(H)	14.6
(Polish Football Association) Legia Warsaw	Real Betis	(H)	Djurgårdens IF	(A)	Omonia	(A)	Lugano	(H)	TSC	(A)	Dinamo Minsk	(H)	13.3
(German Football Association) 1. FC Heidenheim	Chelsea	(H)	İstanbul Başakşehir	(A)	Olimpija Ljubljana	(H)	Heart of Midlothian	(A)	St. Gallen	(H)	Pafos	(A)	25.6
(Swedish Football Association) Djurgårdens IF	LASK	(A)	Legia Warsaw	(H)	Vitória de Guimarães	(H)	The New Saints	(A)	Panathinaikos	(H)	Víkingur Reykjavík	(A)	14.2
(Cyprus Football Association) APOEL	Fiorentina	(H)	Molde	(A)	Astana	(H)	Shamrock Rovers	(A)	Borac Banja Luka	(H)	Noah	(A)	16.4
(Austrian Football Association) Rapid Wien	Copenhagen	(H)	İstanbul Başakşehir	(A)	Omonia	(A)	Shamrock Rovers	(H)	Petrocub Hîncești	(A)	Noah	(H)	18.5
(Cyprus Football Association) Omonia	Gent	(A)	Legia Warsaw	(H)	Rapid Wien	(H)	Heart of Midlothian	(A)	Borac Banja Luka	(A)	Víkingur Reykjavík	(H)	15.6
(Football Association of Finland) HJK	Real Betis	(A)	Molde	(H)	Olimpija Ljubljana	(H)	Lugano	(A)	Panathinaikos	(A)	Dinamo Minsk	(H)	15.1
(Portuguese Football Federation) Vitória de Guimarães	Fiorentina	(H)	Djurgårdens IF	(A)	Astana	(A)	Mladá Boleslav	(H)	St. Gallen	(A)	Celje	(H)	14.6
(Kazakhstan Football Federation) Astana	Chelsea	(H)	APOEL	(A)	Vitória de Guimarães	(H)	The New Saints	(A)	TSC	(H)	Pafos	(A)	23.4
(Football Association of Slovenia) Olimpija Ljubljana	LASK	(H)	1. FC Heidenheim	(A)	HJK	(A)	Cercle Brugge	(H)	Jagiellonia Białystok	(A)	Larne	(H)	14.2
(Royal Belgian Football Association) Cercle Brugge	LASK	(A)	İstanbul Başakşehir	(H)	Olimpija Ljubljana	(A)	Heart of Midlothian	(H)	St. Gallen	(H)	Víkingur Reykjavík	(A)	15.7
(Football Association of Ireland) Shamrock Rovers	Chelsea	(A)	APOEL	(H)	Rapid Wien	(A)	The New Saints	(H)	Borac Banja Luka	(H)	Larne	(A)	23.8
(Football Association of Wales) The New Saints	Fiorentina	(A)	Djurgårdens IF	(H)	Astana	(H)	Shamrock Rovers	(A)	Panathinaikos	(H)	Celje	(A)	15.0
(Swiss Football Association) Lugano	Gent	(H)	Legia Warsaw	(A)	HJK	(H)	Mladá Boleslav	(A)	TSC	(A)	Pafos	(H)	15.3
(Scottish Football Association) Heart of Midlothian	Copenhagen	(A)	1. FC Heidenheim	(H)	Omonia	(H)	Cercle Brugge	(A)	Petrocub Hîncești	(H)	Dinamo Minsk	(A)	17.0
(Football Association of the Czech Republic) Mladá Boleslav	Real Betis	(H)	Molde	(A)	Vitória de Guimarães	(A)	Lugano	(H)	Jagiellonia Białystok	(H)	Noah	(A)	14.7
(Moldovan Football Federation) Petrocub Hîncești	Real Betis	(H)	İstanbul Başakşehir	(A)	Rapid Wien	(H)	Heart of Midlothian	(A)	Jagiellonia Białystok	(A)	Pafos	(H)	15.5
(Swiss Football Association) St. Gallen	Fiorentina	(H)	1. FC Heidenheim	(A)	Vitória de Guimarães	(H)	Cercle Brugge	(A)	TSC	(H)	Larne	(A)	15.1
(Hellenic Football Federation) Panathinaikos	Chelsea	(H)	Djurgårdens IF	(A)	HJK	(H)	The New Saints	(A)	Borac Banja Luka	(A)	Dinamo Minsk	(H)	23.8
(Football Association of Serbia) TSC	Gent	(A)	Legia Warsaw	(H)	Astana	(A)	Lugano	(H)	St. Gallen	(A)	Noah	(H)	15.1
(Football Association of Bosnia and Herzegovina) Borac Banja Luka	LASK	(H)	APOEL	(A)	Omonia	(H)	Shamrock Rovers	(A)	Panathinaikos	(H)	Víkingur Reykjavík	(A)	13.9
(Polish Football Association) Jagiellonia Białystok	Copenhagen	(A)	Molde	(H)	Olimpija Ljubljana	(H)	Mladá Boleslav	(A)	Petrocub Hîncești	(H)	Celje	(A)	18.2
(Football Association of Slovenia) Celje	Real Betis	(A)	İstanbul Başakşehir	(H)	Vitória de Guimarães	(A)	The New Saints	(H)	Jagiellonia Białystok	(H)	Pafos	(A)	15.2
(Irish Football Association) Larne	Gent	(H)	Molde	(A)	Olimpija Ljubljana	(A)	Shamrock Rovers	(H)	St. Gallen	(H)	Dinamo Minsk	(A)	17.4
(Football Federation of Belarus) Dinamo Minsk	Copenhagen	(H)	Legia Warsaw	(A)	HJK	(A)	Heart of Midlothian	(H)	Panathinaikos	(A)	Larne	(H)	16.5
(Cyprus Football Association) Pafos	Fiorentina	(A)	1. FC Heidenheim	(H)	Astana	(H)	Lugano	(A)	Petrocub Hîncești	(A)	Celje	(H)	15.0
(Football Association of Iceland) Víkingur Reykjavík	LASK	(A)	Djurgårdens IF	(H)	Omonia	(A)	Cercle Brugge	(H)	Borac Banja Luka	(H)	Noah	(A)	13.8
(Football Federation of Armenia) Noah	Chelsea	(A)	APOEL	(H)	Rapid Wien	(A)	Mladá Boleslav	(H)	TSC	(A)	Víkingur Reykjavík	(H)	23.5

== League phase table ==
Pos	Team	Pld	W	D	L	GF	GA	GD	Pts	Qualification
1	(The Football Association) Chelsea	6	6	0	0	26	5	+21	18	Advance to round of 16 (seeded)
2	(Portuguese Football Federation) Vitória de Guimarães	6	4	2	0	13	6	+7	14	Advance to round of 16 (seeded)
3	(Italian Football Federation) Fiorentina	6	4	1	1	18	7	+11	13	Advance to round of 16 (seeded)
4	(Austrian Football Association) Rapid Wien	6	4	1	1	11	5	+6	13	Advance to round of 16 (seeded)
5	(Swedish Football Association) Djurgårdens IF	6	4	1	1	11	7	+4	13 (Note: Away goals scored: Djurgårdens IF 5, Lugano 4.)	Advance to round of 16 (seeded)
6	(Swiss Football Association) Lugano	6	4	1	1	11	7	+4	13	Advance to round of 16 (seeded)
7	(Polish Football Association) Legia Warsaw	6	4	0	2	13	5	+8	12	Advance to round of 16 (seeded)
8	(Royal Belgian Football Association) Cercle Brugge	6	3	2	1	14	7	+7	11	Advance to round of 16 (seeded)
9	(Polish Football Association) Jagiellonia Białystok	6	3	2	1	10	5	+5	11	Advance to knockout phase play-offs (seeded)
10	(Football Association of Ireland) Shamrock Rovers	6	3	2	1	12	9	+3	11	Advance to knockout phase play-offs (seeded)
11	(Cyprus Football Association) APOEL	6	3	2	1	8	5	+3	11	Advance to knockout phase play-offs (seeded)
12	(Cyprus Football Association) Pafos	6	3	1	2	11	7	+4	10	Advance to knockout phase play-offs (seeded)
13	(Hellenic Football Federation) Panathinaikos	6	3	1	2	10	7	+3	10	Advance to knockout phase play-offs (seeded)
14	(Football Association of Slovenia) Olimpija Ljubljana	6	3	1	2	7	6	+1	10	Advance to knockout phase play-offs (seeded)
15	(Royal Spanish Football Federation) Real Betis	6	3	1	2	6	5	+1	10	Advance to knockout phase play-offs (seeded)
16	(German Football Association) 1. FC Heidenheim	6	3	1	2	7	7	0	10	Advance to knockout phase play-offs (seeded)
17	(Royal Belgian Football Association) Gent	6	3	0	3	8	8	0	9	Advance to knockout phase play-offs (unseeded)
18	(Danish Football Association) Copenhagen	6	2	2	2	8	9	−1	8	Advance to knockout phase play-offs (unseeded)
19	(Football Association of Iceland) Víkingur Reykjavík	6	2	2	2	7	8	−1	8	Advance to knockout phase play-offs (unseeded)
20	(Football Association of Bosnia and Herzegovina) Borac Banja Luka	6	2	2	2	4	7	−3	8	Advance to knockout phase play-offs (unseeded)
21	(Football Association of Slovenia) Celje	6	2	1	3	13	13	0	7	Advance to knockout phase play-offs (unseeded)
22	(Cyprus Football Association) Omonia	6	2	1	3	7	7	0	7	Advance to knockout phase play-offs (unseeded)
23	(Norwegian Football Federation) Molde	6	2	1	3	10	11	−1	7	Advance to knockout phase play-offs (unseeded)
24	(Football Association of Serbia) TSC	6	2	1	3	10	13	−3	7	Advance to knockout phase play-offs (unseeded)
25	(Scottish Football Association) Heart of Midlothian	6	2	1	3	6	9	−3	7	
26	(Turkish Football Federation) İstanbul Başakşehir	6	1	3	2	9	12	−3	6	
27	(Football Association of the Czech Republic) Mladá Boleslav	6	2	0	4	7	10	−3	6	
28	(Kazakhstan Football Federation) Astana	6	1	2	3	4	8	−4	5	
29	(Swiss Football Association) St. Gallen	6	1	2	3	10	18	−8	5	
30	(Football Association of Finland) HJK	6	1	1	4	3	9	−6	4	
31	(Football Federation of Armenia) Noah	6	1	1	4	6	16	−10	4	
32	(Football Association of Wales) The New Saints	6	1	0	5	5	10	−5	3	
33	(Football Federation of Belarus) Dinamo Minsk	6	1	0	5	4	13	−9	3	
34	(Irish Football Association) Larne	6	1	0	5	3	12	−9	3	
35	(Austrian Football Association) LASK	6	0	3	3	4	14	−10	3	
36	(Moldovan Football Federation) Petrocub Hîncești	6	0	2	4	4	13	−9	2	

Source: UEFA
Rules for classification: League phase tiebreakers

== Results summary ==
=== By matchday ===
Matchday 1
Home team	Score	Away team
İstanbul Başakşehir (Turkey)	1–2	(Austria) Rapid Wien
Vitória de Guimarães (Portugal)	3–1	(Slovenia) Celje
1. FC Heidenheim (Germany)	2–1	(Slovenia) Olimpija Ljubljana
Cercle Brugge (Belgium)	6–2	(Switzerland) St. Gallen
Astana (Kazakhstan)	1–0	(Serbia) TSC
Dinamo Minsk (Belarus)	1–2	(Scotland) Heart of Midlothian
Noah (Armenia)	2–0	(Czech Republic) Mladá Boleslav
Legia Warsaw (Poland)	1–0	(Spain) Real Betis
Molde (Norway)	3–0	(Northern Ireland) Larne
Omonia (Cyprus)	4–0	(Iceland) Víkingur Reykjavík
Fiorentina (Italy)	2–0	(Wales) The New Saints
Chelsea (England)	4–2	(Belgium) Gent
Copenhagen (Denmark)	1–2	(Poland) Jagiellonia Białystok
Lugano (Switzerland)	3–0	(Finland) HJK
Petrocub Hîncești (Moldova)	1–4	(Cyprus) Pafos
Borac Banja Luka (Bosnia and Herzegovina)	1–1	(Greece) Panathinaikos
LASK (Austria)	2–2	(Sweden) Djurgårdens IF
Shamrock Rovers (Republic of Ireland)	1–1	(Cyprus) APOEL

Matchday 2
Home team	Score	Away team
Víkingur Reykjavík (Iceland)	3–1	(Belgium) Cercle Brugge
APOEL (Cyprus)	0–1	(Bosnia and Herzegovina) Borac Banja Luka
Djurgårdens IF (Sweden)	1–2	(Portugal) Vitória de Guimarães
St. Gallen (Switzerland)	2–4	(Italy) Fiorentina
Heart of Midlothian (Scotland)	2–0	(Cyprus) Omonia
Jagiellonia Białystok (Poland)	2–0	(Moldova) Petrocub Hîncești
Gent (Belgium)	2–1	(Norway) Molde
Larne (Northern Ireland)	1–4	(Republic of Ireland) Shamrock Rovers
Celje (Slovenia)	5–1	(Turkey) İstanbul Başakşehir
Panathinaikos (Greece)	1–4	(England) Chelsea
Rapid Wien (Austria)	1–0	(Armenia) Noah
Mladá Boleslav (Czech Republic)	0–1	(Switzerland) Lugano
TSC (Serbia)	0–3	(Poland) Legia Warsaw
HJK (Finland)	1–0	(Belarus) Dinamo Minsk
Olimpija Ljubljana (Slovenia)	2–0	(Austria) LASK
Pafos (Cyprus)	0–1	(Germany) 1. FC Heidenheim
Real Betis (Spain)	1–1	(Denmark) Copenhagen
The New Saints (Wales)	2–0	(Kazakhstan) Astana

Matchday 3
Home team	Score	Away team
Víkingur Reykjavík (Iceland)	2–0	(Bosnia and Herzegovina) Borac Banja Luka
Petrocub Hîncești (Moldova)	0–3	(Austria) Rapid Wien
TSC (Serbia)	4–1	(Switzerland) Lugano
HJK (Finland)	0–2	(Slovenia) Olimpija Ljubljana
Gent (Belgium)	1–0	(Cyprus) Omonia
Legia Warsaw (Poland)	4–0	(Belarus) Dinamo Minsk
Pafos (Cyprus)	1–0	(Kazakhstan) Astana
Shamrock Rovers (Republic of Ireland)	2–1	(Wales) The New Saints
APOEL (Cyprus)	2–1	(Italy) Fiorentina
Chelsea (England)	8–0	(Armenia) Noah
Djurgårdens IF (Sweden)	2–1	(Greece) Panathinaikos
Copenhagen (Denmark)	2–2	(Turkey) İstanbul Başakşehir
Heart of Midlothian (Scotland)	0–2	(Germany) 1. FC Heidenheim
Jagiellonia Białystok (Poland)	3–0	(Norway) Molde
Larne (Northern Ireland)	1–2	(Switzerland) St. Gallen
LASK (Austria)	0–0	(Belgium) Cercle Brugge
Real Betis (Spain)	2–1	(Slovenia) Celje
Vitória de Guimarães (Portugal)	2–1	(Czech Republic) Mladá Boleslav

Matchday 4
Home team	Score	Away team
İstanbul Başakşehir (Turkey)	1–1	(Moldova) Petrocub Hîncești
Astana (Kazakhstan)	1–1	(Portugal) Vitória de Guimarães
1. FC Heidenheim (Germany)	0–2	(England) Chelsea
Cercle Brugge (Belgium)	2–0	(Scotland) Heart of Midlothian
Dinamo Minsk (Belarus)	1–2	(Denmark) Copenhagen
Noah (Armenia)	0–0	(Iceland) Víkingur Reykjavík
St. Gallen (Switzerland)	2–2	(Serbia) TSC
Borac Banja Luka (Bosnia and Herzegovina)	2–1	(Austria) LASK
Molde (Norway)	0–1	(Cyprus) APOEL
Celje (Slovenia)	3–3	(Poland) Jagiellonia Białystok
Panathinaikos (Greece)	1–0	(Finland) HJK
The New Saints (Wales)	0–1	(Sweden) Djurgårdens IF
Fiorentina (Italy)	3–2	(Cyprus) Pafos
Lugano (Switzerland)	2–0	(Belgium) Gent
Mladá Boleslav (Czech Republic)	2–1	(Spain) Real Betis
Olimpija Ljubljana (Slovenia)	1–0	(Northern Ireland) Larne
Omonia (Cyprus)	0–3	(Poland) Legia Warsaw
Rapid Wien (Austria)	1–1	(Republic of Ireland) Shamrock Rovers

Matchday 5
Home team	Score	Away team
Víkingur Reykjavík (Iceland)	1–2	(Sweden) Djurgårdens IF
Astana (Kazakhstan)	1–3	(England) Chelsea
Fiorentina (Italy)	7–0	(Austria) LASK
Copenhagen (Denmark)	2–0	(Scotland) Heart of Midlothian
Dinamo Minsk (Belarus)	2–0	(Northern Ireland) Larne
Noah (Armenia)	1–3	(Cyprus) APOEL
Petrocub Hîncești (Moldova)	0–1	(Spain) Real Betis
HJK (Finland)	2–2	(Norway) Molde
İstanbul Başakşehir (Turkey)	3–1	(Germany) 1. FC Heidenheim
Legia Warsaw (Poland)	1–2	(Switzerland) Lugano
Olimpija Ljubljana (Slovenia)	1–4	(Belgium) Cercle Brugge
St. Gallen (Switzerland)	1–4	(Portugal) Vitória de Guimarães
Mladá Boleslav (Czech Republic)	1–0	(Poland) Jagiellonia Białystok
Gent (Belgium)	3–0	(Serbia) TSC
Omonia (Cyprus)	3–1	(Austria) Rapid Wien
Pafos (Cyprus)	2–0	(Slovenia) Celje
Shamrock Rovers (Republic of Ireland)	3–0	(Bosnia and Herzegovina) Borac Banja Luka
The New Saints (Wales)	0–2	(Greece) Panathinaikos

Matchday 6
Home team	Score	Away team
1. FC Heidenheim (Germany)	1–1	(Switzerland) St. Gallen
APOEL (Cyprus)	1–1	(Kazakhstan) Astana
Cercle Brugge (Belgium)	1–1	(Turkey) İstanbul Başakşehir
Chelsea (England)	5–1	(Republic of Ireland) Shamrock Rovers
Djurgårdens IF (Sweden)	3–1	(Poland) Legia Warsaw
Lugano (Switzerland)	2–2	(Cyprus) Pafos
Borac Banja Luka (Bosnia and Herzegovina)	0–0	(Cyprus) Omonia
TSC (Serbia)	4–3	(Armenia) Noah
Heart of Midlothian (Scotland)	2–2	(Moldova) Petrocub Hîncești
Jagiellonia Białystok (Poland)	0–0	(Slovenia) Olimpija Ljubljana
Larne (Northern Ireland)	1–0	(Belgium) Gent
LASK (Austria)	1–1	(Iceland) Víkingur Reykjavík
Molde (Norway)	4–3	(Czech Republic) Mladá Boleslav
Celje (Slovenia)	3–2	(Wales) The New Saints
Panathinaikos (Greece)	4–0	(Belarus) Dinamo Minsk
Real Betis (Spain)	1–0	(Finland) HJK
Rapid Wien (Austria)	3–0	(Denmark) Copenhagen
Vitória de Guimarães (Portugal)	1–1	(Italy) Fiorentina

=== By team ===
Results by Pot 1 team
Team	Matchday					
Team	1	2	3	4	5	6
(England) Chelsea	GNT (H)	PAN (A)	NOA (H)	HEI (A)	AST (A)	SHR (H)
(England) Chelsea	4–2	4–1	8–0	2–0	3–1	5–1
(Denmark) Copenhagen	JAG (H)	BET (A)	IBS (H)	DMI (A)	HEA (H)	RWI (A)
(Denmark) Copenhagen	1–2	1–1	2–2	2–1	2–0	0–3
(Belgium) Gent	CHE (A)	MOL (H)	OMO (H)	LUG (A)	TSC (H)	LAR (A)
(Belgium) Gent	2–4	2–1	1–0	0–2	3–0	0–1
(Italy) Fiorentina	TNS (H)	STG (A)	APO (A)	PAF (H)	LASK (H)	VIT (A)
(Italy) Fiorentina	2–0	4–2	1–2	3–2	7–0	1–1
(Austria) LASK	DJU (H)	LJU (A)	CER (H)	BOR (A)	FIO (A)	VIK (H)
(Austria) LASK	2–2	0–2	0–0	1–2	0–7	1–1
(Spain) Real Betis	LEG (A)	CPH (H)	CLJ (H)	MLA (A)	PET (A)	HJK (H)
(Spain) Real Betis	0–1	1–1	2–1	1–2	1–0	1–0

Results by Pot 2 team
Team	Matchday					
Team	1	2	3	4	5	6
(Turkey) İstanbul Başakşehir	RWI (H)	CLJ (A)	CPH (A)	PET (H)	HEI (H)	CER (A)
(Turkey) İstanbul Başakşehir	1–2	1–5	2–2	1–1	3–1	1–1
(Norway) Molde	LAR (H)	GNT (A)	JAG (A)	APO (H)	HJK (A)	MLA (H)
(Norway) Molde	3–0	1–2	0–3	0–1	2–2	4–3
(Poland) Legia Warsaw	BET (H)	TSC (A)	DMI (H)	OMO (A)	LUG (H)	DJU (A)
(Poland) Legia Warsaw	1–0	3–0	4–0	3–0	1–2	1–3
(Germany) 1. FC Heidenheim	LJU (H)	PAF (A)	HEA (A)	CHE (H)	IBS (A)	STG (H)
(Germany) 1. FC Heidenheim	2–1	1–0	2–0	0–2	1–3	1–1
(Sweden) Djurgårdens IF	LASK (A)	VIT (H)	PAN (H)	TNS (A)	VIK (A)	LEG (H)
(Sweden) Djurgårdens IF	2–2	1–2	2–1	1–0	2–1	3–1
(Cyprus) APOEL	SHR (A)	BOR (H)	FIO (H)	MOL (A)	NOA (A)	AST (H)
(Cyprus) APOEL	1–1	0–1	2–1	1–0	3–1	1–1

Results by Pot 3 team
Team	Matchday					
Team	1	2	3	4	5	6
(Austria) Rapid Wien	IBS (A)	NOA (H)	PET (A)	SHR (H)	OMO (A)	CPH (H)
(Austria) Rapid Wien	2–1	1–0	3–0	1–1	1–3	3–0
(Cyprus) Omonia	VIK (H)	HEA (A)	GNT (A)	LEG (H)	RWI (H)	BOR (A)
(Cyprus) Omonia	4–0	0–2	0–1	0–3	3–1	0–0
(Finland) HJK	LUG (A)	DMI (H)	LJU (H)	PAN (A)	MOL (H)	BET (A)
(Finland) HJK	0–3	1–0	0–2	0–1	2–2	0–1
(Portugal) Vitória de Guimarães	CLJ (H)	DJU (A)	MLA (H)	AST (A)	STG (A)	FIO (H)
(Portugal) Vitória de Guimarães	3–1	2–1	2–1	1–1	4–1	1–1
(Kazakhstan) Astana	TSC (H)	TNS (A)	PAF (A)	VIT (H)	CHE (H)	APO (A)
(Kazakhstan) Astana	1–0	0–2	0–1	1–1	1–3	1–1
(Slovenia) Olimpija Ljubljana	HEI (A)	LASK (H)	HJK (A)	LAR (H)	CER (H)	JAG (A)
(Slovenia) Olimpija Ljubljana	1–2	2–0	2–0	1–0	1–4	0–0

Results by Pot 4 team
Team	Matchday					
Team	1	2	3	4	5	6
(Belgium) Cercle Brugge	STG (H)	VIK (A)	LASK (A)	HEA (H)	LJU (A)	IBS (H)
(Belgium) Cercle Brugge	6–2	1–3	0–0	2–0	4–1	1–1
(Republic of Ireland) Shamrock Rovers	APO (H)	LAR (A)	TNS (H)	RWI (A)	BOR (H)	CHE (A)
(Republic of Ireland) Shamrock Rovers	1–1	4–1	2–1	1–1	3–0	1–5
(Wales) The New Saints	FIO (A)	AST (H)	SHR (A)	DJU (H)	PAN (H)	CLJ (A)
(Wales) The New Saints	0–2	2–0	1–2	0–1	0–2	2–3
(Switzerland) Lugano	HJK (H)	MLA (A)	TSC (A)	GNT (H)	LEG (A)	PAF (H)
(Switzerland) Lugano	3–0	1–0	1–4	2–0	2–1	2–2
(Scotland) Heart of Midlothian	DMI (A)	OMO (H)	HEI (H)	CER (A)	CPH (A)	PET (H)
(Scotland) Heart of Midlothian	2–1	2–0	0–2	0–2	0–2	2–2
(Czech Republic) Mladá Boleslav	NOA (A)	LUG (H)	VIT (A)	BET (H)	JAG (H)	MOL (A)
(Czech Republic) Mladá Boleslav	0–2	0–1	1–2	2–1	1–0	3–4

Results by Pot 5 team
Team	Matchday					
Team	1	2	3	4	5	6
(Moldova) Petrocub Hîncești	PAF (H)	JAG (A)	RWI (H)	IBS (A)	BET (H)	HEA (A)
(Moldova) Petrocub Hîncești	1–4	0–2	0–3	1–1	0–1	2–2
(Switzerland) St. Gallen	CER (A)	FIO (H)	LAR (A)	TSC (H)	VIT (H)	HEI (A)
(Switzerland) St. Gallen	2–6	2–4	2–1	2–2	1–4	1–1
(Greece) Panathinaikos	BOR (A)	CHE (H)	DJU (A)	HJK (H)	TNS (A)	DMI (H)
(Greece) Panathinaikos	1–1	1–4	1–2	1–0	2–0	4–0
(Serbia) TSC	AST (A)	LEG (H)	LUG (H)	STG (A)	GNT (A)	NOA (H)
(Serbia) TSC	0–1	0–3	4–1	2–2	0–3	4–3
(Bosnia and Herzegovina) Borac Banja Luka	PAN (H)	APO (A)	VIK (A)	LASK (H)	SHR (A)	OMO (H)
(Bosnia and Herzegovina) Borac Banja Luka	1–1	1–0	0–2	2–1	0–3	0–0
(Poland) Jagiellonia Białystok	CPH (A)	PET (H)	MOL (H)	CLJ (A)	MLA (A)	LJU (H)
(Poland) Jagiellonia Białystok	2–1	2–0	3–0	3–3	0–1	0–0

Results by Pot 6 team
Team	Matchday					
Team	1	2	3	4	5	6
(Slovenia) Celje	VIT (A)	IBS (H)	BET (A)	JAG (H)	PAF (A)	TNS (H)
(Slovenia) Celje	1–3	5–1	1–2	3–3	0–2	3–2
(Belarus) Dinamo Minsk	HEA (H)	HJK (A)	LEG (A)	CPH (H)	LAR (H)	PAN (A)
(Belarus) Dinamo Minsk	1–2	0–1	0–4	1–2	2–0	0–4
(Northern Ireland) Larne	MOL (A)	SHR (H)	STG (H)	LJU (A)	DMI (A)	GNT (H)
(Northern Ireland) Larne	0–3	1–4	1–2	0–1	0–2	1–0
(Cyprus) Pafos	PET (A)	HEI (H)	AST (H)	FIO (A)	CLJ (H)	LUG (A)
(Cyprus) Pafos	4–1	0–1	1–0	2–3	2–0	2–2
(Iceland) Víkingur Reykjavík	OMO (A)	CER (H)	BOR (H)	NOA (A)	DJU (H)	LASK (A)
(Iceland) Víkingur Reykjavík	0–4	3–1	2–0	0–0	1–2	1–1
(Armenia) Noah	MLA (H)	RWI (A)	CHE (A)	VIK (H)	APO (H)	TSC (A)
(Armenia) Noah	2–0	0–1	0–8	0–0	1–3	3–4

Source: UEFA
Scores and legend colours are listed from the perspective of the team in the "Team" column.
Legend: H = home, A = away. Green = win; Yellow = draw; Red = loss.

== Matches ==
The fixture list was announced on 31 August 2024, the day after the draw. This was to ensure no calendar clashes with teams in Champions League and Europa League playing in the same cities.

In principle, each team did not play more than two home matches or two away matches in a row, and played one home match and one away match across both the first and last two matchdays. The matches were played on 3 October, 24 October, 7 November, 28 November, 12 December and 19 December 2024 (exclusive week). (Note: As part of the scheduling for the 2024–25 UEFA men's club season, each competition had an "exclusive week" in the calendar, with no other competitions scheduled during this week. For the Conference League, this took place on matchday 6 (19 December 2024).) Matches were generally played on Thursdays. In principle, the scheduled kick-off times were 16:30, 18:45 and 21:00 CET/CEST. All fixtures on the final matchday were played simultaneously at 21:00.

Times are CET or CEST, (Note: CEST (UTC+2) for dates up to 26 October 2024 (matchdays 1–2), and CET (UTC+1) for dates thereafter (matchdays 3–6).) as listed by UEFA (local times, if different, are in parentheses).

=== Matchday 1 ===
2 October 2024
16:30 (17:30 UTC+3)

İstanbul Başakşehir (Turkish Football Federation)	1–2	(Austrian Football Association) Rapid Wien
Piątek 45+2'	Report	Schaub 43', 46'

Başakşehir Fatih Terim Stadium, Istanbul
Attendance: 7,622
Referee: Adam Ladebäck (Sweden)

2 October 2024
16:30 (15:30 UTC+1)

Vitória de Guimarães (Portuguese Football Federation)	3–1	(Football Association of Slovenia) Celje
Samu 7'; G. Silva 36'; T. Silva 62'	Report	Matko 90+1'

Estádio D. Afonso Henriques, Guimarães
Attendance: 10,263
Referee: Lothar D'hondt (Belgium)

3 October 2024
18:45

1. FC Heidenheim (German Football Association)	2–1	(Football Association of Slovenia) Olimpija Ljubljana
Beck 6'; Wanner 83'	Report	Blanco 77'

Voith-Arena, Heidenheim an der Brenz
Attendance: 12,887
Referee: Enea Jorgji (Albania)

3 October 2024
18:45

Cercle Brugge (Royal Belgian Football Association)	6–2	(Swiss Football Association) St. Gallen
Minda 3'; Denkey 25', 43', 54' (pen.); Magnée 63', 68'	Report	Csoboth 58'; Mambimbi 81'

Jan Breydel Stadium, Bruges
Attendance: 5,195
Referee: Arda Kardeşler (Turkey)

3 October 2024
18:45 (21:45 UTC+5)

Astana (Kazakhstan Football Federation)	1–0	(Football Association of Serbia) TSC
Kažukolovas 15'	Report

Almaty Central Stadium, Almaty (Note: Astana played their home matches at Almaty Central Stadium, Almaty, instead of their regular stadium, Astana Arena, Astana, due to renovation works.)
Attendance: 6,576
Referee: Oliver Reitala (Finland)

3 October 2024
18:45 (20:45 UTC+4)

Dinamo Minsk (Football Federation of Belarus)	1–2	(Scottish Football Association) Heart of Midlothian
Alfred 21'	Report	Politevich 37' (o.g.); Dhanda 90+4'

Sumgayit City Stadium, Sumgait, Azerbaijan (Note: Due to the country's involvement in the Russian invasion of Ukraine, Belarusian teams were required to play their home matches at neutral venues and behind closed doors. Therefore, Dinamo Minsk played their home matches at Sumgayit City Stadium, Sumgait, Azerbaijan, instead of their regular stadium, Dinamo Stadium, Minsk.)
Attendance: 0
Referee: Mohammed Al-Hakim (Sweden)

3 October 2024
18:45 (20:45 UTC+4)

Noah (Football Federation of Armenia)	2–0	(Football Association of the Czech Republic) Mladá Boleslav
Aiás 58'; Pinson 76'	Report

Vazgen Sargsyan Republican Stadium, Yerevan (Note: Noah played their home matches at Vazgen Sargsyan Republican Stadium, Yerevan, instead of their regular stadium, Armavir City Stadium, Armavir, which did not meet UEFA requirements.)
Attendance: 8,000
Referee: Radoslav Gidzhenov (Bulgaria)

3 October 2024
18:45

Legia Warsaw (Polish Football Association)	1–0	(Royal Spanish Football Federation) Real Betis
Kapuadi 23'	Report

Polish Army Stadium, Warsaw
Attendance: 25,385
Referee: Luca Pairetto (Italy)

3 October 2024
18:45

Molde (Norwegian Football Federation)	3–0	(Irish Football Association) Larne
Eikrem 51'; Brynhildsen 78'; Ihler 90+5'	Report

Aker Stadion, Molde
Attendance: 3,400
Referee: Dario Bel (Croatia)

3 October 2024
18:45 (19:45 UTC+3)

Omonia (Cyprus Football Association)	4–0	(Football Association of Iceland) Víkingur Reykjavík
Coulibaly 51'; Kakoullis 81', 90'; Alioum 86'	Report

GSP Stadium, Nicosia
Attendance: 11,153
Referee: Sander van der Eijk (Netherlands)

3 October 2024
21:00

Fiorentina (Italian Football Federation)	2–0	(Football Association of Wales) The New Saints
Adli 65'; Kean 68'	Report

Stadio Artemio Franchi, Florence
Attendance: 10,751
Referee: Sebastian Gishamer (Austria)

3 October 2024
21:00 (20:00 UTC+1)

Chelsea (The Football Association)	4–2	(Royal Belgian Football Association) Gent
Veiga 12'; Neto 46'; Nkunku 63'; Dewsbury-Hall 70'	Report	Watanabe 50'; Gandelman 90'

Stamford Bridge, London
Attendance: 38,546
Referee: Daniel Schlager (Germany)

3 October 2024
21:00

Copenhagen (Danish Football Association)	1–2	(Polish Football Association) Jagiellonia Białystok
Hatzidiakos 12'	Report	Pululu 51'; Churlinov 90+7'

Parken Stadium, Copenhagen
Attendance: 22,393
Referee: Rob Harvey (Republic of Ireland)

3 October 2024
21:00

Lugano (Swiss Football Association)	3–0	(Football Association of Finland) HJK
Papadopoulos 34'; Marques 56'; Dos Santos 90+1'	Report

Stockhorn Arena, Thun (Note: Lugano played their home matches at Stockhorn Arena, Thun, instead of their regular stadium, Cornaredo Stadium, Lugano, due to renovation work.)
Attendance: 932
Referee: David Dickinson (Scotland)

3 October 2024
21:00 (22:00 UTC+3)

Petrocub Hîncești (Moldovan Football Federation)	1–4	(Cyprus Football Association) Pafos
Lungu 26' (pen.)	Report	Correia 33', 52'; Jajá 37'; Name 82'

Zimbru Stadium, Chișinău (Note: Petrocub Hîncești played their home matches at Zimbru Stadium, Chișinău, instead of their regular stadium, Stadionul Municipal, Hîncești, which did not meet UEFA requirements.)
Attendance: 3,148
Referee: Mikkel Redder (Denmark)

3 October 2024
21:00

Borac Banja Luka (Football Association of Bosnia and Herzegovina)	1–1	(Hellenic Football Federation) Panathinaikos
Despotović 50'	Report	Bakasetas 11'

Banja Luka City Stadium, Banja Luka
Attendance: 4,208
Referee: Elchin Masiyev (Azerbaijan)

3 October 2024
21:00

LASK (Austrian Football Association)	2–2	(Swedish Football Association) Djurgårdens IF
Berisha 26'; Flecker 49'	Report	Priske 58'; Nguen 65'

Raiffeisen Arena, Linz
Attendance: 8,500
Referee: Bulat Sariyev (Kazakhstan)

3 October 2024
21:00 (20:00 UTC+1)

Shamrock Rovers (Football Association of Ireland)	1–1	(Cyprus Football Association) APOEL
Watts 90+2'	Report	Laifis 59'

Tallaght Stadium, Tallaght
Attendance: 7,111
Referee: Jérémie Pignard (France)

=== Matchday 2 ===
24 October 2024
16:30 (14:30 UTC+0) (Note: The Víkingur Reykjavík v Cercle Brugge match, originally scheduled for 21:00 (20:00 UTC+0), was later moved to 16:30 (15:30 UTC+0).)

Víkingur Reykjavík (Football Association of Iceland)	3–1	(Royal Belgian Football Association) Cercle Brugge
Sigurpálsson 17'; Djuric 76'; Vatnhamar 83'	Report	Olaigbe 16'

Kópavogsvöllur, Kópavogur (Note: Víkingur Reykjavík played their home matches during the league phase at Kópavogsvöllur, Kópavogur, instead of their regular stadium, Víkingsvöllur, Reykjavík, which did not meet UEFA requirements. While the Kópavogsvöllur did not meet all the requirements due to inadequate floodlights, UEFA granted an exemption to allow matches to be played there, with the condition of an earlier kick-off time.)
Attendance: 1,200
Referee: Vitālijs Spasjoņņikovs (Latvia)

24 October 2024
18:45 (19:45 UTC+3)

APOEL (Cyprus Football Association)	0–1	(Football Association of Bosnia and Herzegovina) Borac Banja Luka
	Report	Savić 63'

GSP Stadium, Nicosia
Attendance: 9,173
Referee: Robert Jones (England)

24 October 2024
18:45

Djurgårdens IF (Swedish Football Association)	1–2	(Portuguese Football Federation) Vitória de Guimarães
Stensson 62'	Report	M. Silva 58'; Santos 79'

Tele2 Arena, Stockholm
Attendance: 12,666
Referee: Genc Nuza (Kosovo)

24 October 2024
18:45

St. Gallen (Swiss Football Association)	2–4	(Italian Football Federation) Fiorentina
Mambimbi 23'; Görtler 62'	Report	Martínez Quarta 50'; Ikoné 54', 69'; Gosens 90+3'

Kybunpark, St. Gallen
Attendance: 16,747
Referee: Yigal Frid (Israel)

24 October 2024
18:45 (17:45 UTC+1)

Heart of Midlothian (Scottish Football Association)	2–0	(Cyprus Football Association) Omonia
Forrest 17'; Spittal 23'	Report

Tynecastle Park, Edinburgh
Attendance: 17,178
Referee: Michal Očenáš (Slovakia)

24 October 2024
18:45

Jagiellonia Białystok (Polish Football Association)	2–0	(Moldovan Football Federation) Petrocub Hîncești
Pululu 69', 72'	Report

Białystok Municipal Stadium, Białystok
Attendance: 14,021
Referee: Daniyar Sakhi (Kazakhstan)

24 October 2024
18:45

Gent (Royal Belgian Football Association)	2–1	(Norwegian Football Federation) Molde
Fadiga 24'; Brown 90+5'	Report	Dæhli 78'

Planet Group Arena, Ghent
Attendance: 8,027
Referee: Goga Kikacheishvili (Georgia)

24 October 2024
18:45 (17:45 UTC+1)

Larne (Irish Football Association)	1–4	(Football Association of Ireland) Shamrock Rovers
Gallagher 48'	Report	Honohan 3'; Kenny 24'; Cosgrove 30' (o.g.); Burke 54'

Windsor Park, Belfast (Note: Larne played their home matches at Windsor Park, Belfast, instead of their regular stadium, Inver Park, Larne, which did not meet UEFA requirements.)
Attendance: 5,439
Referee: Vassilios Fotias (Greece)

24 October 2024
18:45

Celje (Football Association of Slovenia)	5–1	(Turkish Football Federation) İstanbul Başakşehir
Svetlin 5'; Brnić 30'; Sešlar 34'; Kučys 51', 77'	Report	Pelkas 75'

Stadion Z'dežele, Celje
Attendance: 2,175
Referee: Oleksiy Derevinskyi (Ukraine)

24 October 2024
18:45 (19:45 UTC+3)

Panathinaikos (Hellenic Football Federation)	1–4	(The Football Association) Chelsea
Pellistri 69'	Report	Félix 22', 55'; Mudryk 49'; Nkunku 59' (pen.)

Olympic Stadium, Athens
Attendance: 59,742
Referee: António Nobre (Portugal)

24 October 2024
18:45

Rapid Wien (Austrian Football Association)	1–0	(Football Federation of Armenia) Noah
Beljo 31'	Report

Allianz Stadion, Vienna
Attendance: 18,600
Referee: Kristo Tohver (Estonia)

24 October 2024
21:00

Mladá Boleslav (Football Association of the Czech Republic)	0–1	(Swiss Football Association) Lugano
	Report	Steffen 38'

Lokotrans Aréna, Mladá Boleslav
Attendance: 2,836
Referee: Chrysovalantis Theouli (Cyprus)

24 October 2024
21:00

TSC (Football Association of Serbia)	0–3	(Polish Football Association) Legia Warsaw
	Report	Kapustka 11'; Luquinhas 47'; Chodyna 62'

TSC Arena, Bačka Topola
Attendance: 3,090
Referee: Julian Weinberger (Austria)

24 October 2024
21:00 (22:00 UTC+3)

HJK (Football Association of Finland)	1–0	(Football Federation of Belarus) Dinamo Minsk
Möller 46'	Report

Bolt Arena, Helsinki
Attendance: 4,211
Referee: Henrik Nalbandyan (Armenia)

24 October 2024
21:00

Olimpija Ljubljana (Football Association of Slovenia)	2–0	(Austrian Football Association) LASK
Blanco 14'; Lucas 80'	Report

Stožice Stadium, Ljubljana
Attendance: 6,558
Referee: Daniele Chiffi (Italy)

24 October 2024
21:00 (22:00 UTC+3)

Pafos (Cyprus Football Association)	0–1	(German Football Association) 1. FC Heidenheim
	Report	Mainka 25'

Alphamega Stadium, Limassol (Note: Pafos played their home matches at the Alphamega Stadium, Limassol, instead of their regular stadium, Stelios Kyriakides Stadium, Paphos, which did not meet UEFA requirements.)
Attendance: 2,511
Referee: Jasper Vergoote (Belgium)

24 October 2024
21:00

Real Betis (Royal Spanish Football Federation)	1–1	(Danish Football Association) Copenhagen
Ezzalzouli 8'	Report	Diks 77' (pen.)

Estadio Benito Villamarín, Seville
Attendance: 45,702
Referee: Willy Delajod (France)

24 October 2024
21:00 (20:00 UTC+1)

The New Saints (Football Association of Wales)	2–0	(Kazakhstan Football Federation) Astana
Holden 40'; McManus 78' (pen.)	Report

New Meadow, Shrewsbury, England (Note: The New Saints played their home matches at New Meadow, Shrewsbury, England, instead of their regular stadium, Park Hall, Oswestry, which did not meet UEFA requirements.)
Attendance: 2,202
Referee: Juri Frischer (Estonia)

=== Matchday 3 ===
7 November 2024
15:30 (14:30 UTC+0) (Note: The Víkingur Reykjavík v Borac Banja Luka, originally scheduled for 18:45 (17:45 UTC+0), was later moved to 15:30 (14:30 UTC+0).)

Víkingur Reykjavík (Football Association of Iceland)	2–0	(Football Association of Bosnia and Herzegovina) Borac Banja Luka
Hansen 17'; Gunnarsson 23'	Report

Kópavogsvöllur, Kópavogur
Attendance: 902
Referee: Jan Petřík (Czech Republic)

7 November 2024
18:45 (19:45 UTC+2)

Petrocub Hîncești (Moldovan Football Federation)	0–3	(Austrian Football Association) Rapid Wien
	Report	Bolla 13'; Burgstaller 53', 79'

Zimbru Stadium, Chișinău
Attendance: 3,879
Referee: Antoni Bandić (Bosnia and Herzegovina)

7 November 2024
18:45

TSC (Football Association of Serbia)	4–1	(Swiss Football Association) Lugano
Stanić 4', 62'; Pantović 59', 83'	Report	Mahmoud 61'

TSC Arena, Bačka Topola
Attendance: 8,584
Referee: Jacob Sundberg (Denmark)

7 November 2024
18:45 (19:45 UTC+2)

HJK (Football Association of Finland)	0–2	(Football Association of Slovenia) Olimpija Ljubljana
	Report	Brest 57'; Agba 68'

Bolt Arena, Helsinki
Attendance: 6,394
Referee: Robert Jones (England)

7 November 2024
18:45

Gent (Royal Belgian Football Association)	1–0	(Cyprus Football Association) Omonia
Gandelman 31'	Report

Planet Group Arena, Ghent
Attendance: 8,584
Referee: Tamás Bognár (Hungary)

7 November 2024
18:45

Legia Warsaw (Polish Football Association)	4–0	(Football Federation of Belarus) Dinamo Minsk
Luquinhas 10', 55'; Gual 51' (pen.), 59'	Report

Polish Army Stadium, Warsaw
Attendance: 22,723
Referee: Atilla Karaoğlan (Turkey)

7 November 2024
18:45 (19:45 UTC+2)

Pafos (Cyprus Football Association)	1–0	(Kazakhstan Football Federation) Astana
Anderson 87'	Report

Alphamega Stadium, Limassol
Attendance: 3,062
Referee: Don Robertson (Scotland)

7 November 2024
18:45 (17:45 UTC+0)

Shamrock Rovers (Football Association of Ireland)	2–1	(Football Association of Wales) The New Saints
Kenny 23'; Watts 38'	Report	J. Williams 14'

Tallaght Stadium, Tallaght
Attendance: 6,108
Referee: Snir Levy (Israel)

7 November 2024
21:00 (22:00 UTC+2)

APOEL (Cyprus Football Association)	2–1	(Italian Football Federation) Fiorentina
Donis 37'; Abagna 45+1'	Report	Ikoné 74'

GSP Stadium, Nicosia
Attendance: 9,300
Referee: François Letexier (France)

7 November 2024
21:00 (20:00 UTC+0)

Chelsea (The Football Association)	8–0	(Football Federation of Armenia) Noah
Adarabioyo 12'; Guiu 13'; Disasi 18'; Félix 21', 41'; Mudryk 39'; Nkunku 69', 76' (pen.)	Report

Stamford Bridge, London
Attendance: 38,305
Referee: Christian-Petru Ciochirca (Austria)

7 November 2024
21:00

Djurgårdens IF (Swedish Football Association)	2–1	(Hellenic Football Federation) Panathinaikos
Gulliksen 49'; Hümmet 72'	Report	Đuričić 17'

Tele2 Arena, Stockholm
Attendance: 17,376
Referee: Igor Pajač (Croatia)

7 November 2024
21:00

Copenhagen (Danish Football Association)	2–2	(Turkish Football Federation) İstanbul Başakşehir
Chiakha 79', 83'	Report	Kény 26'; Piątek 80'

Parken Stadium, Copenhagen
Attendance: 23,070
Referee: Joey Kooij (Netherlands)

7 November 2024
21:00 (20:00 UTC+0)

Heart of Midlothian (Scottish Football Association)	0–2	(German Football Association) 1. FC Heidenheim
	Report	Conteh 57'; Schöppner 89'

Tynecastle Park, Edinburgh
Attendance: 17,692
Referee: Kristoffer Hagenes (Norway)

7 November 2024
21:00

Jagiellonia Białystok (Polish Football Association)	3–0	(Norwegian Football Federation) Molde
Pululu 6'; Hansen 70', 75'	Report

Białystok Municipal Stadium, Białystok
Attendance: 12,478
Referee: Miloš Milanović (Serbia)

7 November 2024
21:00 (20:00 UTC+0)

Larne (Irish Football Association)	1–2	(Swiss Football Association) St. Gallen
Diaby 4' (o.g.)	Report	Görtler 29'; Vandermersch 79'

Windsor Park, Belfast
Attendance: 4,448
Referee: Ishmael Barbara (Malta)

7 November 2024
21:00

LASK (Austrian Football Association)	0–0	(Royal Belgian Football Association) Cercle Brugge
	Report

Raiffeisen Arena, Linz
Attendance: 8,500
Referee: Radoslav Gidzhenov (Bulgaria)

7 November 2024
21:00

Real Betis (Royal Spanish Football Federation)	2–1	(Football Association of Slovenia) Celje
Natan 75'; Juanmi 90+4'	Report	Nieto 81'

Estadio Benito Villamarín, Seville
Attendance: 37,618
Referee: Novak Simović (Serbia)

7 November 2024
21:00 (20:00 UTC+0)

Vitória de Guimarães (Portuguese Football Federation)	2–1	(Football Association of the Czech Republic) Mladá Boleslav
T. Silva 40' (pen.); Rivas 59'	Report	Kušej 72'

Estádio D. Afonso Henriques, Guimarães
Attendance: 12,941
Referee: Paweł Raczkowski (Poland)

=== Matchday 4 ===
27 November 2024
16:30 (18:30 UTC+3)

İstanbul Başakşehir (Turkish Football Federation)	1–1	(Moldovan Football Federation) Petrocub Hîncești
Piątek 42' (pen.)	Report	Borș 90+6'

Başakşehir Fatih Terim Stadium, Istanbul
Attendance: 4,350
Referee: Genc Nuza (Kosovo)

28 November 2024
16:30 (20:30 UTC+5)

Astana (Kazakhstan Football Federation)	1–1	(Portuguese Football Federation) Vitória de Guimarães
Kalaica 40'	Report	Ramírez 89'

Almaty Central Stadium, Almaty
Attendance: 3,562
Referee: Nikola Dabanović (Montenegro)

28 November 2024
18:45

1. FC Heidenheim (German Football Association)	0–2	(The Football Association) Chelsea
	Report	Nkunku 51'; Mudryk 86'

Voith-Arena, Heidenheim an der Brenz
Attendance: 15,000
Referee: Serdar Gözübüyük (Netherlands)

28 November 2024
18:45

Cercle Brugge (Royal Belgian Football Association)	2–0	(Scottish Football Association) Heart of Midlothian
Efekele 40'; Magnée 90'	Report

Jan Breydel Stadium, Bruges
Attendance: 7,722
Referee: Elchin Masiyev (Azerbaijan)

28 November 2024
18:45 (21:45 UTC+4)

Dinamo Minsk (Football Federation of Belarus)	1–2	(Danish Football Association) Copenhagen
Adeola 13'	Report	Elyounoussi 6'; Diks 55' (pen.)

Sumgayit City Stadium, Sumgait, Azerbaijan
Attendance: 0
Referee: Michal Očenáš (Slovakia)

28 November 2024
18:45 (21:45 UTC+4)

Noah (Football Federation of Armenia)	0–0	(Football Association of Iceland) Víkingur Reykjavík
	Report

Vazgen Sargsyan Republican Stadium, Yerevan
Attendance: 5,000
Referee: Menelaos Antoniou (Cyprus)

28 November 2024
18:45

St. Gallen (Swiss Football Association)	2–2	(Football Association of Serbia) TSC
Cissé 31'; Konietzke 65'	Report	Pantović 40', 53'

Kybunpark, St. Gallen
Attendance: 15,200
Referee: Jérémie Pignard (France)

28 November 2024
18:45

Borac Banja Luka (Football Association of Bosnia and Herzegovina)	2–1	(Austrian Football Association) LASK
Despotović 82'; Skorup 89'	Report	Berisha 51'

Banja Luka City Stadium, Banja Luka
Attendance: 7,238
Referee: Gustavo Correia (Portugal)

28 November 2024
18:45

Molde (Norwegian Football Federation)	0–1	(Cyprus Football Association) APOEL
	Report	Laifis 41'

Aker Stadion, Molde
Attendance: 2,916
Referee: Damian Sylwestrzak (Poland)

28 November 2024
18:45

Celje (Football Association of Slovenia)	3–3	(Polish Football Association) Jagiellonia Białystok
Zec 7'; Nieto 54'; Diéguez 80' (o.g.)	Report	Pululu 34'; Imaz 71'; Hansen 78'

Stadion Z'dežele, Celje
Attendance: 3,520
Referee: Allard Lindhout (Netherlands)

28 November 2024
18:45 (19:45 UTC+2)

Panathinaikos (Hellenic Football Federation)	1–0	(Football Association of Finland) HJK
Toivio 33' (o.g.)	Report

Olympic Stadium, Athens
Attendance: 18,822
Referee: Donatas Rumšas (Lithuania)

28 November 2024
18:45 (17:45 UTC+0)

The New Saints (Football Association of Wales)	0–1	(Swedish Football Association) Djurgårdens IF
	Report	Gulliksen 41'

New Meadow, Shrewsbury, England
Attendance: 3,568
Referee: Philip Farrugia (Malta)

28 November 2024
21:00

Fiorentina (Italian Football Federation)	3–2	(Cyprus Football Association) Pafos
Kouamé 38'; Goldar 53' (o.g.); Martínez Quarta 72'	Report	Jairo 68'; Jajá 87'

Stadio Artemio Franchi, Florence
Attendance: 11,145
Referee: Espen Eskås (Norway)

28 November 2024
21:00

Lugano (Swiss Football Association)	2–0	(Royal Belgian Football Association) Gent
Mahou 6'; Doumbia 86'	Report

Stockhorn Arena, Thun
Attendance: 2,672
Referee: Enea Jorgji (Albania)

28 November 2024
21:00

Mladá Boleslav (Football Association of the Czech Republic)	2–1	(Royal Spanish Football Federation) Real Betis
Vojta 51'; Vydra 54'	Report	Lo Celso 17'

Lokotrans Aréna, Mladá Boleslav
Attendance: 3,960
Referee: Daniel Schlager (Germany)

28 November 2024
21:00

Olimpija Ljubljana (Football Association of Slovenia)	1–0	(Irish Football Association) Larne
Durdov 67'	Report

Stožice Stadium, Ljubljana
Attendance: 4,954
Referee: Sander van der Eijk (Netherlands)

28 November 2024
21:00 (22:00 UTC+2)

Omonia (Cyprus Football Association)	0–3	(Polish Football Association) Legia Warsaw
	Report	Morishita 17'; Szczepaniak 77'; Wszołek 86'

GSP Stadium, Nicosia
Attendance: 8,009
Referee: Radoslav Gidzhenov (Bulgaria)

28 November 2024
21:00

Rapid Wien (Austrian Football Association)	1–1	(Football Association of Ireland) Shamrock Rovers
Cvetković 9'	Report	Kenny 55'

Allianz Stadion, Vienna
Attendance: 20,700
Referee: Gergő Bogár (Hungary)

=== Matchday 5 ===
12 December 2024
14:00 (13:00 UTC+0) (Note: The Víkingur Reykjavík v Djurgårdens IF match, originally scheduled for 21:00 (20:00 UTC+0), was later moved to 14:00 (13:00 UTC+0).)

Víkingur Reykjavík (Football Association of Iceland)	1–2	(Swedish Football Association) Djurgårdens IF
Sigurpálsson 72'	Report	Kosugi 62'; Wikheim 65'

Kópavogsvöllur, Kópavogur
Attendance: 1,450
Referee: Luka Bilbija (Bosnia and Herzegovina)

12 December 2024
16:30 (20:30 UTC+5)

Astana (Kazakhstan Football Federation)	1–3	(The Football Association) Chelsea
Tomasov 45'	Report	Guiu 14', 18'; Veiga 39'

Almaty Central Stadium, Almaty
Attendance: 20,982
Referee: Sven Jablonski (Germany)

12 December 2024
18:45

Fiorentina (Italian Football Federation)	7–0	(Austrian Football Association) LASK
Sottil 10', 58'; Ikoné 22'; Richardson 39'; Mandragora 69'; Stojković 82' (o.g.); Guðmundsson 85' (pen.)	Report

Stadio Artemio Franchi, Florence
Attendance: 9,211
Referee: Balázs Berke (Hungary)

12 December 2024
18:45

Copenhagen (Danish Football Association)	2–0	(Scottish Football Association) Heart of Midlothian
Chiakha 48'; Diks 78' (pen.)	Report

Parken Stadium, Copenhagen
Attendance: 24,207
Referee: Andrea Colombo (Italy)

12 December 2024
18:45 (21:45 UTC+4)

Dinamo Minsk (Football Federation of Belarus)	2–0	(Irish Football Association) Larne
Hawrylovich 67' (pen.); Zherdzyew 73'	Report

Sumgayit City Stadium, Sumgait, Azerbaijan
Attendance: 0
Referee: Sayat Karabayev (Kazakhstan)

12 December 2024
18:45 (21:45 UTC+4)

Noah (Football Federation of Armenia)	1–3	(Cyprus Football Association) APOEL
Aiás 45+4'	Report	Chebake 23'; Kostadinov 89'; Abagna 90+3'

Vazgen Sargsyan Republican Stadium, Yerevan
Attendance: 7,500
Referee: Miloš Milanović (Serbia)

12 December 2024
18:45 (19:45 UTC+2)

Petrocub Hîncești (Moldovan Football Federation)	0–1	(Royal Spanish Football Federation) Real Betis
	Report	Bakambu 54'

Zimbru Stadium, Chișinău
Attendance: 5,354
Referee: Lothar D'hondt (Belgium)

12 December 2024
18:45 (19:45 UTC+2)

HJK (Football Association of Finland)	2–2	(Norwegian Football Federation) Molde
Erwin 32'; Meriluoto 90+2'	Report	Ihler 14', 27'

Bolt Arena, Helsinki
Attendance: 4,454
Referee: Atilla Karaoğlan (Turkey)

12 December 2024
18:45 (20:45 UTC+3)

İstanbul Başakşehir (Turkish Football Federation)	3–1	(German Football Association) 1. FC Heidenheim
Türüç 6'; Crespo 18'; Piątek 68'	Report	Honsak 61'

Başakşehir Fatih Terim Stadium, Istanbul
Attendance: 4,769
Referee: Marco Guida (Italy)

12 December 2024
18:45

Legia Warsaw (Polish Football Association)	1–2	(Swiss Football Association) Lugano
Morishita 11'	Report	Bottani 40'; Hajdari 74'

Polish Army Stadium, Warsaw
Attendance: 21,767
Referee: Juan Martínez Munuera (Spain)

12 December 2024
18:45

Olimpija Ljubljana (Football Association of Slovenia)	1–4	(Royal Belgian Football Association) Cercle Brugge
Blanco 5'	Report	Olaigbe 2', 81'; Felipe Augusto 24'; Denkey 72'

Stožice Stadium, Ljubljana
Attendance: 5,646
Referee: Adam Ladebäck (Sweden)

12 December 2024
21:00

St. Gallen (Swiss Football Association)	1–4	(Portuguese Football Federation) Vitória de Guimarães
Csoboth 66'	Report	Mendes 33'; G. Silva 58'; Alberto 84'; Samu 90+4'

Kybunpark, St. Gallen
Attendance: 16,249
Referee: Nick Walsh (Scotland)

12 December 2024
21:00

Mladá Boleslav (Football Association of the Czech Republic)	1–0	(Polish Football Association) Jagiellonia Białystok
Vydra 76'	Report

Lokotrans Aréna, Mladá Boleslav
Attendance: 3,316
Referee: David Dickinson (Scotland)

12 December 2024
21:00

Gent (Royal Belgian Football Association)	3–0	(Football Association of Serbia) TSC
Dean 8' (pen.); Gandelman 13'; Surdez 20'	Report

Planet Group Arena, Ghent
Attendance: 5,423
Referee: Ashot Ghaltakhchyan (Armenia)

12 December 2024
21:00 (22:00 UTC+2)

Omonia (Cyprus Football Association)	3–1	(Austrian Football Association) Rapid Wien
Kakoullis 52'; Semedo 66'; Saidou 90+6'	Report	Beljo 62'

GSP Stadium, Nicosia
Attendance: 7,801
Referee: Daniel Stefański (Poland)

12 December 2024
21:00 (22:00 UTC+2)

Pafos (Cyprus Football Association)	2–0	(Football Association of Slovenia) Celje
Dragomir 48'; Correia 63'	Report

Alphamega Stadium, Limassol
Attendance: 2,051
Referee: Paweł Raczkowski (Poland)

12 December 2024
21:00 (20:00 UTC+0)

Shamrock Rovers (Football Association of Ireland)	3–0	(Football Association of Bosnia and Herzegovina) Borac Banja Luka
Kenny 12', 64'; Farrugia 56'	Report

Tallaght Stadium, Tallaght
Attendance: 7,442
Referee: Stefan Ebner (Austria)

12 December 2024
21:00 (20:00 UTC+0)

The New Saints (Football Association of Wales)	0–2	(Hellenic Football Federation) Panathinaikos
	Report	Đuričić 15'; Ioannidis 62' (pen.)

New Meadow, Shrewsbury, England
Attendance: 5,716
Referee: Oliver Reitala (Finland)

=== Matchday 6 ===
19 December 2024
21:00

1. FC Heidenheim (German Football Association)	1–1	(Swiss Football Association) St. Gallen
Theuerkauf 30'	Report	Stanić 77'

Voith-Arena, Heidenheim an der Brenz
Attendance: 12,800
Referee: Javier Alberola Rojas (Spain)

19 December 2024
21:00 (22:00 UTC+2)

APOEL (Cyprus Football Association)	1–1	(Kazakhstan Football Federation) Astana
Donis 56'	Report	Kažukolovas 64'

GSP Stadium, Nicosia
Attendance: 11,181
Referee: Sebastian Gishamer (Austria)

19 December 2024
21:00

Cercle Brugge (Royal Belgian Football Association)	1–1	(Turkish Football Federation) İstanbul Başakşehir
Brunner 82'	Report	Piątek 74'

Jan Breydel Stadium, Bruges
Attendance: 4,411
Referee: István Vad (Hungary)

19 December 2024
21:00 (20:00 UTC+0)

Chelsea (The Football Association)	5–1	(Football Association of Ireland) Shamrock Rovers
Guiu 23', 34', 45+3'; Dewsbury-Hall 40'; Cucurella 58'	Report	Poom 26'

Stamford Bridge, London
Attendance: 38,467
Referee: Willy Delajod (France)

19 December 2024
21:00

Djurgårdens IF (Swedish Football Association)	3–1	(Polish Football Association) Legia Warsaw
Nguen 24'; Hümmet 45+4'; Åslund 76'	Report	Wszołek 56'

Tele2 Arena, Stockholm
Attendance: 23,270
Referee: David Šmajc (Slovenia)

19 December 2024
21:00

Lugano (Swiss Football Association)	2–2	(Cyprus Football Association) Pafos
Mahmoud 7'; Bottani 33'	Report	Saipi 4' (o.g.); Goldar 90+5'

Stockhorn Arena, Thun
Attendance: 1,795
Referee: Nenad Minaković (Serbia)

19 December 2024
21:00

Borac Banja Luka (Football Association of Bosnia and Herzegovina)	0–0	(Cyprus Football Association) Omonia
	Report

Banja Luka City Stadium, Banja Luka
Attendance: 5,034
Referee: Mohammed Al-Hakim (Sweden)

19 December 2024
21:00

TSC (Football Association of Serbia)	4–3	(Football Federation of Armenia) Noah
Stanić 41'; Đakovac 74', 76'; Pantović 81'	Report	Aiás 5', 48'; Ferreira 15'

TSC Arena, Bačka Topola
Attendance: 1,210
Referee: Marian Barbu (Romania)

19 December 2024
21:00 (20:00 UTC+0)

Heart of Midlothian (Scottish Football Association)	2–2	(Moldovan Football Federation) Petrocub Hîncești
Wilson 64'; Spittal 70'	Report	Plătică 21'; Mudrac 83' (pen.)

Tynecastle Park, Edinburgh
Attendance: 17,103
Referee: Ondřej Berka (Czech Republic)

19 December 2024
21:00

Jagiellonia Białystok (Polish Football Association)	0–0	(Football Association of Slovenia) Olimpija Ljubljana
	Report

Białystok Municipal Stadium, Białystok
Attendance: 14,329
Referee: Luis Godinho (Portugal)

19 December 2024
21:00 (20:00 UTC+0)

Larne (Irish Football Association)	1–0	(Royal Belgian Football Association) Gent
Cosgrove 74'	Report

Windsor Park, Belfast
Attendance: 2,393
Referee: Sigurd Kringstad (Norway)

19 December 2024
21:00

LASK (Austrian Football Association)	1–1	(Football Association of Iceland) Víkingur Reykjavík
Ljubičić 26'	Report	Sigurpálsson 23' (pen.)

Raiffeisen Arena, Linz
Attendance: 7,900
Referee: Mohammad Al-Emara (Finland)

19 December 2024
21:00

Molde (Norwegian Football Federation)	4–3	(Football Association of the Czech Republic) Mladá Boleslav
Ihler 27'; Král 42' (o.g.); Kaasa 64'; Stenevik 90+1'	Report	Suchý 5'; Kušej 59'; Vydra 61'

Aker Stadion, Molde
Attendance: 1,750
Referee: Visar Kastrati (Kosovo)

19 December 2024
21:00

Celje (Football Association of Slovenia)	3–2	(Football Association of Wales) The New Saints
Edmilson 20', 43'; Zec 79'	Report	Davies 19'; Holden 42'

Stadion Z'dežele, Celje
Attendance: 2,640
Referee: Lukas Fähndrich (Switzerland)

19 December 2024
21:00 (22:00 UTC+2)

Panathinaikos (Hellenic Football Federation)	4–0	(Football Federation of Belarus) Dinamo Minsk
Jeremejeff 33'; Tetê 54', 65'; Ioannidis 84'	Report

Olympic Stadium, Athens
Attendance: 19,866
Referee: Rob Hennessy (Republic of Ireland)

19 December 2024
21:00

Real Betis (Royal Spanish Football Federation)	1–0	(Football Association of Finland) HJK
Cardoso 27'	Report

Estadio Benito Villamarín, Seville
Attendance: 35,779
Referee: Patrik Kolarić (Croatia)

19 December 2024
21:00

Rapid Wien (Austrian Football Association)	3–0	(Danish Football Association) Copenhagen
Beljo 45+2'; Wurmbrand 51', 64'	Report

Allianz Stadion, Vienna
Attendance: 24,465
Referee: John Beaton (Scotland)

19 December 2024
21:00 (20:00 UTC+0)

Vitória de Guimarães (Portuguese Football Federation)	1–1	(Italian Football Federation) Fiorentina
G. Silva 33'	Report	Mandragora 87'

Estádio D. Afonso Henriques, Guimarães
Attendance: 16,466
Referee: Juxhin Xhaja (Albania)
