= 2024–25 Vitória S.C. season =

Vitória S.C.
2024–25 season
- Head coach: Rui Borges (until 25 December); Daniel Sousa (26 December–13 January)
- Stadium: Estádio D. Afonso Henriques
- Primeira Liga: 6th
- Taça de Portugal: Fifth round
- Taça da Liga: Quarter-finals
- UEFA Conference League: Round of 16
- Top goalscorer: League: Gustavo Silva (7 goals); All: Gustavo Silva (11 goals)
- Average home league attendance: 18,447
colours	Away colours	Third colours

The 2024–25 season was the 103rd season in the history of the Vitória S.C., and it was also the 18th consecutive season in Primeira Liga. In addition to the domestic league, the team participated in the Taça de Portugal, the Taça da Liga, and the UEFA Conference League.

== Transfers ==
=== In ===
Pos.	Player	Transferred from	Fee	Date	Source
Summer transfers
FW	(Brazil) Gustavo Silva	(Brazil) Comercial	Undisclosed	7 August 2024	
FW	(Brazil) Kaio César	(Brazil) Coritiba	€1,500,000	1 July 2024	

=== Out ===
Pos.	Player	Transferred to	Fee	Date	Source
Summer transfers
FW	(Brazil) Kaio César	(Brazil) Coritiba	Loan return	1 July 2024	
MF	(Brazil) Matheus Índio	(China) Qingdao West Coast		3 July 2024	
FW	(Portugal) Jota Silva	(England) Nottingham Forest	Undisclosed (Note: Transfer fee reported as £5.9m with potential add-ons)	1 August 2024	
DF	(Portugal) Ricardo Mangas	(Russia) Spartak Moscow	€2,000,000 (Note: Transfer fee reported as €2m with €500,000 in potential add-ons)	10 September 2024	
Winter transfers
MF	(Portugal) Alberto Costa	(Italy) Juventus	€13,800,000	15 January 2025	
MF	(Portugal) Manu Silva	(Portugal) Benfica	€12,000,000	20 January 2025	
FW	(Brazil) Kaio César	(Saudi Arabia) Al Hilal	€10,000,000	21 January 2025	

== Friendlies ==
=== Pre-season ===
13 July 2024 Friendly	Vitória de Guimarães (Portugal)	2–0	(England) Middlesbrough	Quinta do Lago
13:00 UTC+1	Ramírez 79', 86'			Stadium: The Campus

17 July 2024 Friendly	Vitória de Guimarães (Portugal)	1–1	(Portugal) Leixões
10:30 UTC+1	Bureković 81'		Fabinho

20 July 2024 Friendly	Vitória de Guimarães (Portugal)	2–0	(Spain) Rayo Vallecano	Portugal
19:30 UTC+1	Jota 54'; Marco Cruz 68'

== Competitions ==
=== Overall record ===
Competition	First match	Last match	Starting round	Final position	Record							
Competition	First match	Last match	Starting round	Final position	Pld	W	D	L	GF	GA	GD	Win %
Primeira Liga	12 August 2024	3 January 2025	Matchday 17		18	6	8	4	28	24	+4	33.33
Taça de Portugal	15 October 2024	12 January 2025	Third round	Fifth round	3	2	0	1	6	4	+2	66.67
Taça da Liga	23 November 2024		Quarter-finals	Quarter-finals	1	0	0	1	1	2	−1	0.00
UEFA Conference League	25 July 2024		Second qualifying round		12	10	2	0	30	6	+24	83.33
Total					34	18	10	6	65	36	+29	52.94

Last updated: 20 January 2025
Source: Soccerway

=== Primeira Liga ===
==== League table ====
Pos	Team	Pld	W	D	L	GF	GA	GD	Pts	Qualification or relegation
4	Braga	34	19	9	6	55	30	+25	66	Qualification for the Europa League second qualifying round
5	Santa Clara	34	17	6	11	36	32	+4	57	Qualification for the Conference League second qualifying round
6	Vitória de Guimarães	34	14	12	8	47	37	+10	54	
7	Famalicão	34	12	11	11	44	39	+5	47	
8	Estoril	34	12	10	12	48	53	−5	46	

Source: Liga Portugal
Rules for classification: 1) Points; 2) Head-to-head points; 3) Head-to-head goal difference; 4) Goal difference; 5) Matches won; 6) Goals scored; 7) Play-off.

==== Results summary ====
Overall								Home						Away					
Pld	W	D	L	GF	GA	GD	Pts	W	D	L	GF	GA	GD	W	D	L	GF	GA	GD
18	6	8	4	28	24	+4	26	4	4	1	18	14	+4	2	4	3	10	10	0

Last updated: 20 January 2025.
Source: Soccerway

==== Results by round ====
Round	1	2	3	4	5	6	7	8	9	10	11	12	13	14	15	16	17
Ground	H	A	H	A	H	A	H	A	H	A	H	A	H	A	H	A	H
Result	W	D	L	W	L	D	W	L	W	D	L	W	D	L	D	W	D
Position	8	7	10	9	11	10	9	11	8	8	10	7	7	9	8	6	6

Updated to match(es) played on 5 January 2025. Source: Soccerway
A = Away; H = Home; W = Win; D = Draw; L = Loss

==== Matches ====
The match schedule was released on 7 July 2024.

12 August 2024 1	Arouca	0–1	Vitória de Guimarães	Arouca
20:15	Pinho (yellow card) 62'	Report	Oliveira 14'	Stadium: Estádio Municipal de Arouca; Attendance: 3,394; Referee: Gustavo Correia

18 August 2024 2	Vitória de Guimarães	1–0	Estoril	Guimarães
20:00 WEST (UTC+01:00)	Villanueva (yellow card) 10'; Borevković (yellow card) 26'; Ramírez 32'	Report	Begraoui (yellow card) 56'	Stadium: Estádio D. Afonso Henriques; Attendance: 17,331; Referee: André Narciso

25 August 2024 3	AVS	1–0	Vitória de Guimarães	Aves (Santo Tirso)
20:30 WEST (UTC+01:00)	Lucca (yellow card) 30'; Kiki (yellow card) 46'; Nenê 74'	Report	Villanueva (yellow card) 82'; Silva (yellow card) 85'; Santos (yellow card) 88'	Stadium: Estádio do Clube Desportivo das Aves; Attendance: 4,485; Referee: João Pinheiro

1 September 2024 4	Vitória de Guimarães	2–1	Famalicão	Guimarães
20:30	César 8', (yellow card) 29'; T. Silva (yellow card) 30'; Villanueva (yellow card) 76'; G. Silva (yellow card) 87'; Händel 90+1'		Sorriso 17'; Youssouf (yellow card) 42'; Haas (yellow card) 46'; Gustavo Sá (yellow card) 90'; Gil Dias (yellow card) 90+2'; A. Evangelista (red card) 90+7'	Stadium: Estádio D. Afonso Henriques; Attendance: 20,134; Referee: João Gonçalves

15 September 2024 5	Braga	0–2	Vitória de Guimarães	Braga
20:30 WEST	Zalazar (yellow card) 37'; Arrey-Mbi (red card) 56'; Niakaté (yellow card) 71'; Ferreira (yellow card) 79'	Report	Santos (yellow card) 17'; J. Mendes 52'; Oliveira (yellow card) 57'; Ribeiro 59'; J. T. Mendes (yellow card) 74'	Stadium: Estádio Municipal de Braga; Attendance: 21,215; Referee: Luís Godinho

21 September 2024 6	Vitória de Guimarães	0–3	Porto	Guimarães
18:00 WEST (UTC+01:00)	Mendes (yellow card) 28'; Varela (yellow card) 37'; Silva (yellow card) 37'; Gaspar (yellow card) 46'	Report	Aghehowa 47', 58', (yellow card) 26'; Eustaquio (yellow card) 64'; Pérez (yellow card) 90'; Pepê 88', (yellow card) 45'	Stadium: Estádio D. Afonso Henriques; Attendance: 26,377; Referee: Fábio Veríssimo

28 September 2024 7	Casa Pia	1–1	Vitória Guimarães	Rio Maior
18:00 WEST (UTC+1)	Cassiano 39' (pen.); Goulart (yellow card) 45'; Zolotić (yellow card) 51'	Report	Goulart 49' (o.g.); R. Borges (yellow card) 54'	Stadium: Estádio Municipal de Rio Maior; Attendance: 2,632; Referee: Carlos Macedo

6 October 2024 8	Vitória Guimarães	2–2	Boavista	Guimarães
15:30 UTC+1	Villanueva (yellow card) 6'; G. Silva (yellow card) 31', (goal) 34', 49'; Händel (yellow card) 69'; Varela (yellow card) 90+4'; Oliveira (yellow card) 90+13'	Report	Onyemaechi (yellow card) 11'; César (yellow card) 26'; Joel Silva (yellow card) 45+7'; Reisinho (yellow card) 71', (goal) 90+5' (pen.), 90+15' (pen.); Abascal (yellow card) 90+1'	Stadium: Estádio D. Afonso Henriques; Attendance: 15,961; Referee: Luís Godinho

27 October 2024 9	Estrela da Amadora	2–2	Vitória Guimarães	Amadora
20:30	Bucca 45+1'; Ferro (yellow card) 50'; Nani (yellow card) 66'; D. Delgado (yellow card) 67'; Pinho 84' (pen.)	Report	Händel (yellow card) 32'; Santos 43'; Silva 69' (pen.); Mendes (yellow card) 75'; Manu (yellow card) 82'	Stadium: Estádio José Gomes; Attendance: 2,319; Referee: António Nobre

3 November 2024 10	Vitória Guimarães	1–0	Moreirense	Guimarães
18:00 UTC+1	Oliveira 64'	Report	Frimpong (yellow card) 64'	Stadium: Estádio D. Afonso Henriques; Attendance: 18,031; Referee: Miguel Nogueira

10 November 2024 11	Santa Clara	1–0	Vitória Guimarães	Ponta Delgada
16:30 UTC+1	Calila (yellow card) 7'; J. Batista (yellow card) 45+5'; Klismahn (yellow card) 67'; Rocha (yellow card) 77'; Ricardinho 80', (yellow card) 82'; Lima (yellow card) 90'	Report	César (yellow card) 19'; Oliveira (yellow card) 44'; R. Chaves (yellow card) 53'; Arcanjo (yellow card) 90'; Silva (yellow card) 90+6' (yellow-red card) 90+9'; F. Morato (red card) 90+6'; Varela 90+8'	Stadium: Estádio de São Miguel; Attendance: 2,512; Referee: Gustavo Correia

2 December 2024 12	Vitória Guimarães	4–0	Gil Vicente	Guimarães
18:45 UTC+1	Ramírez 45'; Cruz 46' (o.g.); Manu 59', (yellow card) 63'; Oliveira 87'	Report	Gbane (yellow card) 56'; Cáseres (yellow card) 75'	Stadium: Estádio D. Afonso Henriques; Attendance: 11,317; Referee: Tiago Martins

7 December 2024 13	Benfica	1–0	Vitória de Guimarães	Lisbon
18:00 WET (UTC±0)	Aktürkoğlu 29'; Vangelis Pavlidis (yellow card) 31'; Carreras (yellow card) 59'; Di María (yellow card) 90+3'	Report	Mendes (yellow card) 43'	Stadium: Estádio da Luz; Attendance: 58,839; Referee: Miguel Nogueira (Lisbon)

16 December 2024 14	Rio Ave	2–2	Vitória Guimarães	Vila do Conde
20:45 UTC+1	Clayton 6'; F. Ronaldo 38'; Santos (yellow card) 50'; Neto (yellow card) 88'	Report	Rivas 51', (yellow card) 69'; Silva 58'	Stadium: Estádio do Rio Ave FC; Attendance: 2,897; Referee: António Nobre

23 December 2024 15	Vitória Guimarães	2–2	Nacional	Guimarães
18:45 UTC+1	Silva 24' (pen.); Santos 49'; Händel (yellow card) 90+1'	Report	Isaac 9'; Zé Vítor (yellow card) 18'; Aurélio 90+3'	Stadium: Estádio D. Afonso Henriques; Attendance: - Referee: João Pinheiro

29 December 2024 16	Farense	2–2	Vitória Guimarães	Faro
15:30 UTC+1	Claudio Falcão (yellow card) 29' (goal) 37'; Neto 90+8'; Artur Jorge (yellow card) 81'	Report	Óscar Rivas (yellow card) 31'; Gustavo Silva 49'; João Mendes (yellow card) 64'; Kaio César (yellow card) 79'; Samu 90+1'	Stadium: Estádio de São Luís; Attendance: 6,012; Referee: Bruno Vieira

3 January 2025 17	Vitória Guimarães	4–4	Sporting	Guimarães
20:15 UTC+1	Tiago Silva 7'; Samu (yellow card) 9'; Kaio César 69'; João Mendes (yellow card) 56' (goal) 82'; Michel 85'; Óscar Rivas (yellow card) 89'; Arcanjo (yellow card) 90+3'	Report	Viktor Gyökeres 2', 14', 58' (yellow card) 75'; Morita (yellow card) 18'; Maxi Araújo (yellow card) 81'; St. Juste (yellow card) 84'; Fresneda (yellow card) 90+3'; Trincão 90+5'	Stadium: Estádio D. Afonso Henriques; Attendance: 26,549; Referee: João Gonçalves

16 February 2025 22	Vitória de Guimarães	0–0	Braga	Guimarães
20:30 WET	Borevković (yellow card) 4'; Nélson Oliveira (yellow card) 37'; Beni (yellow card) 83'; João Mendes (yellow card) 85'; Villanueva (yellow card) 90'	Report	Arrey-Mbi (yellow card) 42'; Robson Bambu (yellow card) 56'; João Ferreira (yellow card) 90+2'	Stadium: Estádio D. Afonso Henriques; Attendance: 28,133; Referee: (Portugal) João Ferreira

24 February 2025 23	Porto	1–1	Vitória de Guimarães	Porto
20:15 WET (UTC±00:00)	Vieira 67'	Report	Embaló 86'	Stadium: Estádio do Dragão; Attendance: 44,142; Referee: António Nobre

19 April 2025 30	Vitória de Guimarães	0–3	Benfica	Guimarães
20:30 WEST (UTC+1)	Villanueva (yellow card) 52'; Samu (yellow card) 82'	Report	Pavlidis 21', 84'; Aktürkoğlu (yellow card) 45+1'; Carreras (yellow card) 71' (goal) 77'; Di María (yellow card) 90+1'; Florentino (yellow card) 90+4'	Stadium: Estádio D. Afonso Henriques; Attendance: 23,341; Referee: Gustavo Correia (Porto)

17 May 2025 34	Sporting CP	2–0	Vitória de Guimarães	Lisbon
18:00 WEST (UTC+01:00)	Gonçalves 55'; Gyökeres 82'	Report		Stadium: Estádio José Alvalade; Attendance: 49,155; Referee: Fábio Veríssimo

=== Taça de Portugal ===
19 October 2024 Third round	Pacos de Ferreira	1–3	Vitória de Guimarães	Paços de Ferreira
16:00 WEST (UTC+01:00)	Fonte 44'	Report	Gaspar 3'; Samu 50'; João Mendes 90+2'	Stadium: Estádio da Mata Real

23 November 2024 Fourth round	Vitória de Guimarães	2–0	U.D. Leiria	Guimarães
16:45 WEST (UTC+01:00)	Rivas 43'; Kaio 84'	Report		Stadium: Estádio D. Afonso Henriques

12 January 2025 Fifth round	O Elvas	2–1	Vitória de Guimarães	Elvas
14:00	Silva 50'; Nketia 75'		Michel 2'	Stadium: Campo Domingos Carrilho Patalino

=== Taça da Liga ===
31 October 2024 Quarter-finals	Braga	2–1	Vitória de Guimarães	Braga
18:45 WET	Niakaté 22'; Bruma 75' (pen.)	Report	Santos 10'	Stadium: Estádio Municipal de Braga; Attendance: 9,663; Referee: Fábio Veríssimo

=== UEFA Conference League ===
==== Second qualifying round ====
The draw was held on 19 June 2024.

25 July 2024 First leg	Floriana FC (Malta)	0–1	(Portugal) Vitória de Guimarães	Ta' Qali, Malta
19:00 UTC+2		Report	Jota 78'	Stadium: Centenary Stadium; Referee: Ben Mcmaster (Northern Ireland)

1 August 2024 Second leg	(Portugal) Vitória de Guimarães	4–0 (5–0 agg.)	(Malta) Floriana FC	Guimarães
20:15 UTC+1	César 8'; Fernandes 11'; Mangas 37', 43'	Report		Stadium: Estádio D. Afonso Henriques

==== Third qualifying round ====
The draw was held on 22 July 2024.

8 August 2024 First leg	(Switzerland) Zürich	0–3	(Portugal) Vitória de Guimarães	Zürich, Switzerland
19:00 UTC+2		Report	Mangas 54'; Gómez 78' (o.g.); Oliveira 90+3'	Stadium: Letzigrund

15 August 2024 Second leg	(Portugal) Vitória de Guimarães	2–0 (5–0 agg.)	(Switzerland) Zürich	Guimarães, Portugal
20:00 WEST (UTC+01:00)	Silva 58'; Arcanjo 70'	Report		Stadium: Estádio D. Afonso Henriques

==== Play-off round ====
21 August 2024 First leg	(Portugal) Vitória de Guimarães	3–0	(Bosnia and Herzegovina) Zrinjski Mostar	Guimarães, Portugal
17:45 WEST (UTC+01:00)	Mangas 46'; Borevković 51'; Mendes 88'	Report		Stadium: Estádio D. Afonso Henriques

21 August 2024 Second leg	(Bosnia and Herzegovina) Zrinjski Mostar	0–4 (0–7 agg.)	(Portugal) Vitória de Guimarães	Mostar, Bosnia and Herzegovina
20:00 CET (UTC+1:00)		Report	Silva 46' (pen.); Santos 42'; Oliveira 45+3'; Cunha 71'	Stadium: Stadion pod Bijelim Brijegom

==== League phase ====
The league phase draw was held on 30 August 2024.

Pos	Team	Pld	W	D	L	GF	GA	GD	Pts	Qualification
1	(The Football Association) Chelsea	6	6	0	0	26	5	+21	18	Advance to round of 16 (seeded)
2	(Portuguese Football Federation) Vitória de Guimarães	6	4	2	0	13	6	+7	14	Advance to round of 16 (seeded)
3	(Italian Football Federation) Fiorentina	6	4	1	1	18	7	+11	13	Advance to round of 16 (seeded)
4	(Austrian Football Association) Rapid Wien	6	4	1	1	11	5	+6	13	Advance to round of 16 (seeded)
5	(Swedish Football Association) Djurgårdens IF	6	4	1	1	11	7	+4	13 (Note: Away goals scored: Djurgårdens IF 5, Lugano 4.)	Advance to round of 16 (seeded)

Source: UEFA
Rules for classification: League phase tiebreakers
Notes:

Round	1	2	3	4	5	6
Ground	H	A	H	A	A	H
Result	W	W	W	D	W	D
Position	6	1	5	5	2	2
Points	3	6	9	10	13	14

Updated to match(es) played on 7 November 2024. Source: UEFA
A = Away; H = Home; W = Win; D = Draw; L = Loss

2 October 2024 1	Vitória de Guimarães (Portugal)	3–1	(Slovenia) Celje	Guimarães, Portugal
15:30 WEST (UTC+01:00)	Samu 7'; Cunha 36'; Tiago Silva 62'	Report	Matko 90+1'	Stadium: Estádio D. Afonso Henriques

24 October 2024 2	Djurgården (Sweden)	1–2	(Portugal) Vitória de Guimarães	Stockholm, Sweden
18:45 CET (UTC+01:00)	Stensson 62'	Report	Silva 58'; Santos 79'	Stadium: Tele2 Arena

7 November 2024 3	Vitória de Guimarães (Portugal)	2–1	(Czech Republic) Mladá Boleslav	Estádio D. Afonso Henriques, Guimarães
21:00 (20:00 UTC+0)	Silva 40' (pen.); Rivas 59'	Report	Kušej 72'	Attendance: 12,941; Referee: Paweł Raczkowski (Poland)

28 November 2024 4	Astana (Kazakhstan)	1–1	(Portugal) Vitória de Guimarães	Almaty Central Stadium, Almaty
16:30 (20:30 UTC+5)	Kalaica 40'	Report	Ramírez 89'	Attendance: 3,562; Referee: Nikola Dabanović (Montenegro)

12 December 2024 5	St. Gallen (Switzerland)	1–4	(Portugal) Vitória de Guimarães	Kybunpark, St. Gallen
21:00	Csoboth 66'	Report	Mendes 33'; G. Silva 58'; Alberto 84'; Samu 90+4'	Attendance: 16,249; Referee: Nick Walsh (Scotland)

19 December 2024 6	Vitória de Guimarães (Portugal)	1–1	(Italy) Fiorentina	Estádio D. Afonso Henriques, Guimarães
21:00 (20:00 UTC+0)	G. Silva 33'	Report	Mandragora 87'	Attendance: 16,466; Referee: Juxhin Xhaja (Albania)

==== Knockout phase ====
===== Round of 16 =====
The round of 16 draw was held on 21 February 2025.

6 March 2025 First leg	Real Betis (Spain)	2–2	(Portugal) Vitória de Guimarães	Benito Villamarín, Seville
18:45	Bakambu 48'; Isco 75'	Report	Mendes 51'; Oliveira 81'	Attendance: 44,366; Referee: Nikola Dabanović (Montenegro)

13 March 2025 Second leg	Vitória de Guimarães (Portugal)	0–4 (2–6 agg.)	(Spain) Real Betis	Estádio D. Afonso Henriques, Guimarães
21:00 (20:00 UTC+0)		Report	Bakambu 5', 20'; Antony 58'; Isco 80'	Attendance: 28,994; Referee: Serdar Gözübüyük (Netherlands)
