= João Mendes =

João Mendes may refer to:

- João Mendes (director) (1919–1997), Portuguese director
- João Mendes (footballer, born 1988), Portuguese footballer
- João Mendes (footballer, born 1994), Portuguese footballer
- João Mendes (footballer, born 2000), Portuguese footballer
- João Mendes (footballer, born 2005), Brazilian footballer
