= Niasse (surname) =

Niasse is a surname. Notable people with the surname include:

- Babacar Niasse (born 1996), Senegalese footballer
- Cheikh Niasse (born 2000), Senegalese footballer
- Ibrahima Niasse (born 1988), Senegalese footballer
- Moustapha Niasse (born 1939), Senegalese politician and diplomat
- Oumar Niasse (born 1990), Senegalese footballer
- Ahmed Khalifa Niasse (born 1946), Senegalese politician and religious leader
