= Telmo Arcanjo =

Cape Verdean footballer (born 2001)

Personal information
- Full name: Telmo Emanuel Gomes Arcanjo
- Date of birth: 21 June 2001 (age 25)
- Place of birth: Lisbon, Portugal
- Height: 1.80 m (5 ft 11 in)
- Positions: Midfielder; winger

Team information
- Current team: Vitória Guimarães
- Number: 18

Youth career
- 2011–2012: Olivais
- 2012–2013: Sporting
- 2013–2019: Belenenses
- 2019–2020: Tondela

Senior career*
Years	Team	Apps	(Gls)
2020–2023	Tondela	55	(7)
2023–	Vitória Guimarães	60	(6)

International career^{‡}
2019	Cape Verde U19	2	(0)
2021–	Cape Verde	20	(1)
- * Club domestic league appearances and goals as of 1 September 2026 ‡ National team caps and goals as of 29 September 2026

Telmo Emanuel Gomes Arcanjo (Portuguese: [ˈtɛl.mu e.mɐ.nu.ˈɛl ˈɡo.mɨz ɐɾ.ˈkɐ̃.ʒu]; born 21 June 2001) is a professional footballer who plays as a midfielder or winger for Vitória S.C. Born in Portugal, he plays for the Cape Verde national team.

== Club career ==
Arcanjo made his professional debut with Tondela in a 3–2 Primeira Liga loss to Gil Vicente on 14 July 2020.

On 16 June 2023, Vitória SC announced the free signing of Arcanjo on a four-year deal. On 10 January 2026, Arcanjo played in the Portuguese Taça da Liga final against Braga in which Vitória Guimarães won 2-1.

== International career ==
Born in Portugal, Arcanjo is of Cape Verdean descent. He represented the Cape Verde U19s in a friendly 2–0 loss to the Portugal U19s on 30 January 2019. He was called up to the Cape Verde national team for a pair of friendlies in June 2021. He debuted with the Cape Verde national team in a friendly 2–0 loss to Senegal on 8 June 2021.

On 18 May 2026, he was called up by Cape Verde's head coach Bubista for the 2026 FIFA World Cup.

== Career statistics ==
=== Club ===
As of match played 1 September 2026

Appearances and goals by club, season and competition
Club	Season	League			Cup		League Cup		Europe		Other		Total	
Club	Season	Division	Apps	Goals	Apps	Goals	Apps	Goals	Apps	Goals	Apps	Goals	Apps	Goals
Tondela	2019–20	Primeira Liga	2	0	—		—		—		—		2	0
Tondela	2020–21	Primeira Liga	14	0	1	0	—		—		—		15	0
Tondela	2021–22	Primeira Liga	10	0	2	0	0	0	—		—		12	0
Tondela	2022–23	Liga Portugal 2	29	7	3	1	3	1	—		1 (Note: Appearance in Supertaça Cândido de Oliveira)	0	36	9
Tondela	Total		55	7	6	1	3	1	—		1	0	65	9
Vitória Guimarães	2023–24	Primeira Liga	0	0	0	0	0	0	0	0	—		0	0
Vitória Guimarães	2024–25	Primeira Liga	28	5	2	0	0	0	11 (Note: Appearances in UEFA Conference League)	1	—		41	6
Vitória Guimarães	2025–26	Primeira Liga	29	1	2	1	3	0	—		—		34	2
Vitória Guimarães	2026–27	Primeira Liga	3	0	0	0	0	0	—		—		3	0
Vitória Guimarães	Total		60	6	4	1	3	0	11	1	—		78	8
Career total			115	13	10	2	6	1	11	1	1	0	143	17

=== International ===
As of match played 29 September 2026

Appearances and goals by national team and year
National team	Year	Apps	Goals
Cape Verde	2021	1	0
Cape Verde	2022	1	0
Cape Verde	2023	2	0
Cape Verde	2024	2	0
Cape Verde	2025	7	1
Cape Verde	2026	7	0
Total		20	1

Scores and results list Cape Verde's goal tally first, score column indicates score after each Arcanjo goal.

List of international goals scored by Sidny Lopes Cabral
No.	Date	Venue	Opponent	Score	Result	Competition
1	8 October 2025	Tripoli Stadium, Tripoli, Libya	Libya	1–1	3–3	2026 FIFA World Cup qualification

== Personal life ==
Arcanjo is the brother of the Cape Verde international footballer Fábio Arcanjo.

== Honours ==
Individual

- Liga Portugal 2 Young Player of the Season: 2022–23
- Liga Portugal 2 Team of the Season: 2022–23
- Liga Portugal 2 Midfielder of the Month: September 2022, December 2022/January 2023

Vitória SC

- Taça da Liga: 2025–26
