= Fábio Arcanjo =

Cape Verdean footballer (born 1994)

Personal information
- Full name: Fábio Alexandre Gomes Arcanjo
- Date of birth: October 18, 1994 (age 32)
- Place of birth: Lisbon, Portugal
- Height: 1.80 m (5 ft 11 in)
- Position: Midfielder

Team information
- Current team: Oriental
- Number: 8

Youth career
- 2007–2012: Oriental
- 2012–2013: Carregado

Senior career*
Years	Team	Apps	(Gls)
2013–2014	Carregado	23	(0)
2014–2015	Alverca	0	(0)
2015	Casa Pia	3	(0)
2015–2017	Sacavenense	59	(1)
2017–2018	Pinhalnovense	26	(3)
2018–2019	Oriental	30	(1)
2019	Torreense	13	(0)
2020	Beira Mar	5	(0)
2020-2021	U. Almeirim	20	(0)
2021	Cova da Piedade	3	(0)
2021-2022	Sacavenense	14	(2)
2022-	Oriental	112	(4)

International career^{‡}
2018	Cape Verde	1	(0)
- * Club domestic league appearances and goals as of 22 june 2026 ‡ National team caps and goals as of 22:39, 22 june 2026 (UTC)

Fábio Alexandre Gomes Arcanjo (born 18 October 1994) is a professional footballer who plays as a midfielder for the Portuguese club Clube Oriental de Lisboa. Born in Portugal, he represents the Cape Verde national football team.

== International career ==
Arcanjo made his debut for the Cape Verde national football team in a 0–0 (4–3) penalty shootout win over Andorra on 3 June 2018.

== Personal life ==
Arcanjo is the brother of the footballer Telmo Arcanjo.
