= 2022–23 C.D. Tondela season =

C.D. Tondela
2022–23 season
- Chairman: David Belenguer
- Manager: Nuno Campos
- Stadium: Estádio João Cardoso
- Liga Portugal 2: 9th
- Taça de Portugal: Fourth round
- Taça da Liga: Group stage
- Supertaça Cândido de Oliveira: Runners-up
- Top goalscorer: League: Daniel dos Anjos (6); All: Daniel dos Anjos (6)

The 2022–23 season is the 90th season in the history of C.D. Tondela and their first season back in the second division of Portuguese football since 2015. The club are participating in the Liga Portugal 2, the Taça de Portugal, and the Taça da Liga. The season covers the period from 1 July 2022 to 30 June 2023.

== Players ==
As of 7 August 2022

Note: Flags indicate national team as defined under FIFA eligibility rules; some limited exceptions apply. Players may hold more than one non-FIFA nationality.

No.	Pos.	Nation	Player
1	GK	SWE	Philip Tear
2	DF	BRA	Bebeto
3	DF	POR	Rafael Alcobia
4	DF	POR	Jota Gonçalves
6	MF	BRA	Pedro Augusto
7	FW	POR	Rúben Fonseca
8	MF	CPV	Telmo Arcanjo
9	FW	BRA	Daniel dos Anjos
10	MF	POR	Rafael Barbosa
14	DF	POR	Dário Miranda
15	DF	ESP	Manu Hernando
16	GK	MTN	Babacar Niasse
17	FW	POR	Cuba

No.	Pos.	Nation	Player
18	FW	VEN	Matías Lacava (on loan from Puerto Cabello)
19	DF	POR	Tiago Almeida
21	MF	ESP	Iker Undabarrena
23	MF	POR	Rodrigo Cascavel
24	DF	ALG	Naoufel Khacef
28	DF	POR	Rodrigo Fajardo
33	DF	BRA	Marcelo Alves (on loan from Madureira)
34	DF	POR	Ricardo Alves
45	MF	ANG	Betel Valésio
77	FW	CRO	Tomislav Štrkalj
99	GK	POR	Joel Sousa

== Pre-season and friendlies ==
Win Draw Loss Fixtures

9 July 2022 Friendly	Rio Ave (Portugal)	2–0	(Portugal) Tondela	Vila do Conde
10:30 WEST (UTC+1)	Costinha 20'; H. Gomes 77'

16 July 2022 Friendly	Tondela (Portugal)	1–1	(Portugal) Santa Clara	TBD
17:30 WEST (UTC+1)

== Competitions ==
=== Overall record ===
Competition	First match	Last match	Starting round	Final position	Record							
Competition	First match	Last match	Starting round	Final position	Pld	W	D	L	GF	GA	GD	Win %
Liga Portugal 2	6 August 2022	May 2023	Matchday 1		19	5	11	3	22	18	+4	26.32
Taça de Portugal	2 October 2022	9 November 2022	Second round	Fourth round	3	1	1	1	3	2	+1	33.33
Taça da Liga	19 November 2022	15 December 2022	Group stage	Group stage	4	0	3	1	2	5	−3	0.00
Supertaça Cândido de Oliveira	30 July 2022		Final	Final	1	0	0	1	0	3	−3	0.00
Total					27	6	15	6	27	28	−1	22.22

Last updated: 5 February 2023
Source: Soccerway

=== Liga Portugal 2 ===
==== League table ====
Pos	Team	Pld	W	D	L	GF	GA	GD	Pts
9	Torreense	34	13	5	16	38	41	−3	44
10	Oliveirense	34	11	10	13	51	50	+1	43
11	Tondela	34	8	16	10	35	35	0	40
12	Penafiel	34	9	12	13	36	47	−11	39 (Note: Penafiel are ahead of Nacional on head-to-head points: Penafiel 3–0 Nacional, Nacional 1–1 Pennafiel.)
13	Nacional	34	10	9	15	35	46	−11	39

Updated to match(es) played on 28 May 2023. Source: Liga Portugal 2
Rules for classification: 1) Points; 2) Head-to-head points; 3) Head-to-head goal difference; 4) Head-to-head away goals scored; 5) Goal difference; 6) Matches won; 7) Goals scored; 8) Play-off.

==== Results summary ====
Overall								Home						Away					
Pld	W	D	L	GF	GA	GD	Pts	W	D	L	GF	GA	GD	W	D	L	GF	GA	GD
0	0	0	0	0	0	0	0	0	0	0	0	0	0	0	0	0	0	0	0

Last updated: August 2022.
Source: Liga Portugal

==== Results by round ====
Round	1
Ground	
Result	
Position	

Updated to match(es) played on August 2022. Source: Liga Portugal
A = Away; H = Home; W = Win; D = Draw; L = Loss

==== Matches ====
The league fixtures were announced on 5 July 2022.

=== Supertaça Cândido de Oliveira ===
30 July 2022 Final	Porto	3–0	Tondela	Aveiro
20:45 WEST (UTC+1)	Taremi 30', 82'; Evanilson 33'	Report		Stadium: Estádio Municipal de Aveiro; Referee: Manuel Mota
