= Ari Sigurpálsson =

Icelandic footballer (born 2003

Personal information
- Date of birth: 17 March 2003 (age 23)
- Place of birth: Iceland
- Height: 1.78 m (5 ft 10 in)
- Position: Winger

Team information
- Current team: Elfsborg
- Number: 25

Youth career
- –2020: HK
- 2019–2020: → Bologna (loan)
- 2020–2021: Bologna

Senior career*
Years	Team	Apps	(Gls)
2019–2020	HK	2	(0)
2020–2021	Bologna	0	(0)
2020	→ HK (loan)	8	(0)
2022–2025	Víkingur	65	(18)
2025–	Elfsborg	36	(7)

International career^{‡}
2017–2018	Iceland U15	6	(3)
2019	Iceland U16	6	(3)
2019	Iceland U17	6	(0)
2019	Iceland U18	2	(0)
2021–2022	Iceland U19	7	(0)
2022–2024	Iceland U21	9	(2)
- * Club domestic league appearances and goals as of 8 July 2026 ‡ National team caps and goals as of 15 October 2024

Ari Sigurpálsson (born 17 March 2003) is an Icelandic professional footballer who plays as a winger for Elfsborg.

== Club career ==
As a youth player, Sigurpálsson joined the youth academy of Icelandic side HK and was promoted to the club's senior team in 2019, where he made ten league appearances and scored zero goals. In 2019, he joined the youth academy of Italian Serie A side Bologna.

Ahead of the 2022 season, he signed for Icelandic side Víkingur, where he made sixty-five league appearances and scored eighteen goals and helped the club win the league title. Following his stint there, he signed for Swedish side Elfsborg in 2025. Icelandic newspaper wrote in 2025 that he "played brilliantly with Víkingur in recent years and attracted a lot of attention for his performance in the Europa League" upon signing for the club.

== International career ==
Sigurpálsson is an Iceland youth international. During October 2021 and March 2022, he played for the Iceland national under-19 football team for 2022 UEFA European Under-19 Championship qualification.

== Personal life ==
Sigurpálsson was born on 17 March 2003 in Iceland. While playing football, he has been in a relationship with Icelanic footballer Svanhildur Ylfa Dagbjartsdóttir.
