= Nuno Santos (footballer, born 1999) =

Portuguese footballer

Personal information
- Full name: Nuno Miguel Valente Santos
- Date of birth: 2 March 1999 (age 27)
- Place of birth: Porto, Portugal
- Height: 1.79 m (5 ft 10 in)
- Position: Midfielder

Team information
- Current team: Mamelodi Sundowns
- Number: 10

Youth career
- 2007–2008: Boavista
- 2008–2010: Porto
- 2010–2012: Boavista
- 2012–2017: Benfica
- 2017: → Belenenses (loan)

Senior career*
Years	Team	Apps	(Gls)
2017–2022	Benfica B	60	(13)
2020	→ Moreirense (loan)	14	(1)
2020–2021	→ Boavista (loan)	29	(1)
2021–2022	→ Paços Ferreira (loan)	31	(5)
2022–2023	Charlotte FC	9	(1)
2023	Crown Legacy	1	(1)
2023–2025	Vitória Guimarães	65	(5)
2025–	Mamelodi Sundowns	22	(2)

International career
2015	Portugal U16	4	(0)
2016	Portugal U17	13	(1)
2017	Portugal U18	5	(2)
2017–2018	Portugal U19	11	(0)
2018–2019	Portugal U20	10	(2)
2019	Portugal U21	3	(0)
Medal record
Men's football
Representing Portugal
UEFA European Under-19 Championship
Winner	2018
- * Club domestic league appearances and goals as of 13:05, 18 November 2026 (UTC)

Nuno Miguel Valente Santos (born 2 March 1999) is a Portuguese professional footballer who plays as a midfielder for South African Premiership club Mamelodi Sundowns.

== Club career ==
=== Benfica ===
Born in Porto, Santos was a youth player at his city's two major teams, Boavista F.C. and FC Porto, before joining S.L. Benfica in 2012. He made his debut for the reserve team in LigaPro on 8 August 2017 as the season opened with a 2–1 away loss against U.D. Oliveirense, and scored his first goal the following 6 January at the end of a 3–1 defeat at FC Porto B. In 2018–19 he scored a career-best seven goals (adding five in seven matches in the UEFA Youth League), subsequently renewing his contract until 2024.

By then captain of Benfica B, Santos was loaned to Primeira Liga club Moreirense F.C. on 29 January 2020. He made his top-flight debut four days later by starting in a 5–1 away victory over Gil Vicente FC. His first goal at the level came on 11 July to win the game at B-SAD.

Santos continued to be loaned the following two seasons, to Boavista and F.C. Paços de Ferreira. On 19 November 2021, while in service of the latter side, he put his team ahead against his parent club in the fourth round of the Taça de Portugal, but in a 4–1 loss.

=== Charlotte FC ===
On 5 August 2022, Santos signed a two-year deal with Charlotte FC. He scored his only Major League Soccer goal on 17 September in the 3–2 away defeat of Chicago Fire FC, and also spent time with the reserve team Crown Legacy FC.

=== Vitória Guimarães ===
Santos returned to Portugal in July 2023, joining top-flight Vitória S.C. on a four-year contract. On 27 October 2024, his 43rd-minute first-time shot from near the penalty arc helped his side to earn a 2–2 draw at C.F. Estrela da Amadora, and was later voted Goal of the Month for September/October.

During his tenure at the Estádio D. Afonso Henriques, Santos totalled 90 games, eight goals and 14 assists.

=== Mamelodi Sundowns ===
On 23 September 2025, Santos moved to Mamelodi Sundowns F.C. of the South African Premiership. In that season's CAF Champions League, which they won, he scored two goals in a 3–1 group-stage win over FC Saint-Éloi Lupopo and assisted twice in the 3–0 victory against Stade Malien in the quarter-finals.

== International career ==
Santos was part of Hélio Sousa's Portugal under-19 team that won the 2018 UEFA European Championship in Finland. He made three substitute appearances in the tournament, including one in extra time of the final.

On 5 September 2019, Santos earned his first cap for the under-21s, in a 4–0 home defeat of Gibraltar in the 2021 UEFA European Championship qualifiers.

== Career statistics ==
As of match played 17 May 2026

Club	Season	League			National cup (Note: Includes Taça de Portugal, U.S. Open Cup and Nedbank Cup)		League cup (Note: Includes Taça da Liga and Carling Knockout Cup)		Continental		Other		Total	
Club	Season	Division	Apps	Goals	Apps	Goals	Apps	Goals	Apps	Goals	Apps	Goals	Apps	Goals
Benfica B	2017–18	LigaPro	14	3	—		—		—		—		14	3
Benfica B	2018–19	LigaPro	30	7	—		—		—		—		30	7
Benfica B	2019–20	LigaPro	16	3	—		—		—		—		16	3
Benfica B	Total		60	13	—		—		—		—		60	13
Moreirense (loan)	2019–20	Primeira Liga	14	1	0	0	0	0	—		—		14	1
Boavista (loan)	2020–21	Primeira Liga	29	1	1	0	0	0	—		—		30	1
Paços Ferreira (loan)	2021–22	Primeira Liga	31	5	1	0	2	0	4 (Note: Appearances in UEFA Europa Conference League)	0	—		38	5
Charlotte FC	2022	Major League Soccer	4	1	0	0	—		—		—		4	1
Charlotte FC	2023	Major League Soccer	5	0	0	0	—		0	0	0	0	5	0
Charlotte FC	Total		9	1	0	0	—		0	0	0	0	9	1
Crown Legacy	2023	MLS Next Pro	1	1	—		—		—		—		1	1
Vitória Guimarães	2023–24	Primeira Liga	27	2	6	0	1	0	—		—		34	2
Vitória Guimarães	2024–25	Primeira Liga	33	3	3	0	1	1	14	2	—		51	6
Vitória Guimarães	2025–26	Primeira Liga	5	0	0	0	0	0	—		—		5	0
Vitória Guimarães	Total		65	5	9	0	2	1	14	2	—		90	8
Mamelodi Sundowns	2025–26	South African Premiership	18	2	1	0	1	0	9 (Note: Appearances in CAF Champions League)	3	0	0	29	5
Career total			227	29	12	0	5	1	27	5	0	0	271	35

== Honours ==
Benfica

- Campeonato Nacional de Juniores: 2017–18
- UEFA Youth League runner-up: 2016–17

Mamelodi Sundowns

- CAF Champions League: 2025–26
- MTN 8: 2026

Portugal

- UEFA European Under-19 Championship: 2018
