= Babacar Niasse =

Association football player

Personal information
- Full name: Babacar Niasse Mbaye
- Date of birth: 20 December 1996 (age 29)
- Place of birth: Dakar, Senegal
- Height: 1.96 m (6 ft 5 in)
- Position: Goalkeeper

Team information
- Current team: Difaâ El Jadida
- Number: 30

Youth career
- Aspire

Senior career*
Years	Team	Apps	(Gls)
2015–2019	Eupen	19	(0)
2019–2023	Tondela	60	(0)
2023–2025	Guingamp	0	(0)
2025–	Difaâ El Jadida	31	(0)

International career^{‡}
2011	Senegal U17	2	(0)
2022–	Mauritania	26	(0)
- * Club domestic league appearances and goals as of 21 November 2026 ‡ National team caps and goals as of 19 November 2024 (UTC)

Babacar Niasse (born 20 December 1996) is a professional footballer who plays as a goalkeeper for Botola Pro club Difaâ El Jadida. Born in Senegal, he plays for the Mauritania national team.

== Club career ==
Niasse was an attacking midfielder, but changed to a goalkeeper and is known for his exceptional height. An Aspire Academy youth graduate, he joined Eupen in 2015.

On 21 August 2019, Niasse signed a three-year contract with Portuguese Primeira Liga club Tondela.

On 21 July 2023, Niasse signed a two-year contract with Ligue 2 club Guingamp.

== International career ==
Born in Senegal, Niasse is of Mauritanian descent. He was the goalkeeper for the Senegal U17 selection for the 2011 African U-17 Championship. He was called up to represent the senior Mauritania national team for a set of friendlies in March 2022.

== Career statistics ==
=== Club ===
As of match played on 9 December 2023

Appearances and goals by club, season and competition
Club	Season	League			National Cup		League Cup		Other		Total	
Club	Season	Division	Apps	Goals	Apps	Goals	Apps	Goals	Apps	Goals	Apps	Goals
Eupen	2015–16	Belgian Second Division	13	0	0	0	—		—		13	0
Eupen	2016–17	Belgian First Division A	4	0	5	0	—		2	0	11	0
Eupen	2017–18	Belgian First Division A	2	0	2	0	—		6	0	10	0
Eupen	2018–19	Belgian First Division A	0	0	3	0	—		3	0	6	0
Eupen	Total		19	0	10	0	—		11	0	40	0
Tondela	2019–20	Primeira Liga	5	0	1	0	—		—		6	0
Tondela	2020–21	Primeira Liga	17	0	0	0	—		—		17	0
Tondela	2021–22	Primeira Liga	6	0	7	0	1	0	—		14	0
Tondela	2022–23	Liga Portugal 2	32	0	3	0	2	0	1	0	38	0
Tondela	Total		60	0	11	0	3	0	1	0	75	0
Guingamp	2023–24	Ligue 2	0	0	1	0	—		—		1	0
Career totals			230	0	9	0	2	0	0	0	241	0

=== International ===
As of 19 November 2024

National team	Year	Apps	Goals
Mauritania	2022	6	0
Mauritania	2023	7	0
Mauritania	2024	13	0
Total		26	0
