= Manu Silva =

Portuguese footballer

Personal information
- Full name: Manuel Jorge Silva
- Date of birth: 12 June 2001 (age 25)
- Place of birth: Santa Maria da Feira, Portugal
- Height: 1.90 m (6 ft 3 in)
- Position: Defensive midfielder

Team information
- Current team: Benfica
- Number: 16

Youth career
- 2009–2012: União de Lamas
- 2012–2020: Feirense

Senior career*
Years	Team	Apps	(Gls)
2020–2023	Feirense	29	(2)
2023	Vitória Guimarães B	2	(0)
2023–2025	Vitória Guimarães	39	(3)
2025–	Benfica	8	(0)
- * Club domestic league appearances and goals as of 00:59, 18 January 2026 (UTC)

Manuel Jorge Silva (born 12 June 2001) is a Portuguese professional footballer who plays as a defensive midfielder for Primeira Liga club Benfica.

== Club career ==
Silva is a youth product of União de Lamas and Feirense. He was promoted to the senior Feirense side in the summer of 2020. He made his senior and professional debut with Feirense in a 2–0 Liga Portugal 2 loss to Sporting Covilhã on 7 August 2021. On 24 May 2022, he renewed his contract with the club. He transferred to Primeira Liga side Vitória SC on 30 January 2023 until 2027.

On 20 January 2025, Silva joined fellow Primeira Liga club Benfica, signing a contract until June 2030, for a reported transfer fee of €12 million, which could rise to €14 million with add-ons, and Vitória keeping a 20% sell-on fee. Five days later, he made his debut for the Eagles, coming off the bench in the final minutes of a 3–1 league defeat away at Casa Pia. The following week, he started in a 3–2 away victory over Estrela da Amadora. However, on 8 February, in a league clash at Estádio da Luz against Moreirense, Silva suffered a complete anterior cruciate ligamente tear on his left knee, which kept him sidelined for several months. He returned from injury on 25 November 2025, coming on as a substitute for the final minutes of a 2–0 away victory over Ajax at the UEFA Champions League league phase.

== Personal life ==
Manu's father, Jorge Silva, was a former footballer in Portugal.

== Career statistics ==
As of match played 17 January 2026

Appearances and goals by club, season and competition
Club	Season	League			National cup		League cup		Continental		Other		Total	
Club	Season	Division	Apps	Goals	Apps	Goals	Apps	Goals	Apps	Goals	Apps	Goals	Apps	Goals
Feirense	2020–21	Liga Portugal 2	1	0	0	0	—		—		—		1	0
Feirense	2021–22	Liga Portugal 2	17	2	3	0	1	0	—		—		21	2
Feirense	2022–23	Liga Portugal 2	11	0	1	0	0	0	—		—		12	0
Feirense	Total		29	2	4	0	1	0	—		—		34	2
Vitória Guimarães B	2022–23	Liga 3	2	0	—		—		—		—		2	0
Vitória Guimarães	2022–23	Primeira Liga	1	0	0	0	0	0	0	0	—		1	0
Vitória Guimarães	2023–24	Primeira Liga	23	2	4	0	1	0	1 (Note: Appearances in UEFA Europa Conference League)	0	—		29	2
Vitória Guimarães	2024–25	Primeira Liga	15	1	2	0	1	0	10	3	—		28	4
Vitória Guimarães	Total		39	3	6	0	2	0	11	3	—		58	6
Benfica	2024–25	Primeira Liga	3	0	0	0	0	0	0	0	0	0	3	0
Benfica	2025–26	Primeira Liga	5	0	1	0	1	0	1 (Note: Appearances in UEFA Champions League)	0	0	0	8	0
Benfica	Total		8	0	1	0	1	0	1	0	0	0	11	0
Career total			78	5	11	0	4	0	12	3	0	0	105	8
