= Gustavo Silva (footballer, born 1999) =

Brazilian footballer

Personal information
- Full name: Gustavo da Silva Cunha
- Date of birth: 1 June 1999 (age 27)
- Place of birth: São Paulo, Brazil
- Height: 1.80 m (5 ft 11 in)
- Position: Forward

Team information
- Current team: Vitória de Guimarães
- Number: 11

Youth career
- 2017–2018: Taquaritinga

Senior career*
Years	Team	Apps	(Gls)
2018–2019	Taquaritinga	25	(3)
2020	Sobradinho	9	(0)
2020	Inter de Bebedouro	4	(0)
2021	Taquaritinga	11	(1)
2022	Comercial	18	(4)
2022–2024	→ C.D. Nacional (loan)	61	(12)
2024–	Vitória de Guimarães	44	(12)
- * Club domestic league appearances and goals as of 25 May 2026

Gustavo da Silva Cunha (born 1 June 1999), commonly known as Gustavo Silva or Mandingo, is a Brazilian footballer who plays as a forward for Primeira Liga club Vitória de Guimarães.

== Club career ==
Gustavo Silva began his career with Taquaritinga, also playing for Sobradinho and Inter de Bebedouro before a move to Comercial in 2022. He enjoyed a successful loan spell in Portugal with Nacional across the 2022–23 and 2023–24 seasons. During the latter season, he scored 15 goals and added a further 12 assists in 40 appearances across all competitions.

On 7 August 2024, Gustavo Silva joined Primeira Liga club Vitória de Guimarães on a four-year deal. On 29 August, he scored his first goal in a European competition for Vitória, netting the fourth goal in a 4–0 win over Zrinjski Mostar in the play-off round of the UEFA Conference League. On 6 October, he scored twice in a 2–2 draw against Boavista in the league. This strong start was slowed down by a muscular injury in January 2025, with an expected recovery time of two months. On 10 January 2026, Gustavo came on from the bench in the Portuguese Taça da Liga final against Braga in which Vitória won 2–1.

== Career statistics ==
As of match played 14 August 2026

Appearances and goals by club, season and competition
Club	Season	League			State league (Note: Includes Campeonato Paulista Segunda Divisão, Campeonato Brasiliense, Campeonato Paulista Série A3)		National cup (Note: Includes Taça de Portugal)		League cup (Note: Includes Taça da Liga)		Continental		Total	
Club	Season	Division	Apps	Goals	Apps	Goals	Apps	Goals	Apps	Goals	Apps	Goals	Apps	Goals
Taquaritinga	2018	–			14	2	—		—		—		14	2
Taquaritinga	2019	–			11	1	—		—		—		11	1
Taquaritinga	Total				25	3	—		—		—		25	3
Sobradinho	2020	–			9	0	—		—		—		0	0
Inter de Bebedouro	2020	–			4	0	—		—		—		4	0
Taquaritinga	2021	–			11	1	—		—		—		11	1
Comercial	2022	–			18	4	—		—		—		18	4
Nacional	2022–23	Liga Portugal 2	27	0	—		2	1	3	0	—		32	1
Nacional	2023–24	Liga Portugal 2	34	12	—		3	2	3	1	—		40	15
Nacional	Total		61	12	0	0	5	3	6	1	0	0	72	16
Vitória de Guimarães	2024–25	Primeira Liga	21	7	—		0	0	0	0	5 (Note: Appearances in UEFA Conference League)	4	26	11
Vitória de Guimarães	2025–26	Primeira Liga	23	5	—		0	0	1	0	—		24	5
Vitória de Guimarães	2026–27	Primeira Liga	2	0	—		0	0	—		—		2	0
Vitória de Guimarães	Total		46	12	—		0	0	1	0	5	4	52	16
Career total			107	24	67	8	5	3	7	1	5	4	201	40

== Honours ==
Vitória Guimarães

- Taça da Liga: 2025–26

Individual

- Liga Portugal 2 Team of the Year: 2023–24
- Liga Portugal 2 Player of the Month: April 2024
- Liga Portugal 2 top assist provider: 2023–24
