= Samu (footballer, born 1996) =

Portuguese footballer

Personal information
- Full name: Fábio Samuel Amorim Silva
- Date of birth: 21 April 1996 (age 30)
- Place of birth: Mozelos, Portugal
- Height: 1.70 m (5 ft 7 in)
- Position: Midfielder

Team information
- Current team: Vitória Guimarães
- Number: 20

Youth career
- 2005–2006: Paços Brandão
- 2006–2010: Porto
- 2010–2015: Boavista

Senior career*
Years	Team	Apps	(Gls)
2013–2019	Boavista	18	(0)
2017	→ Fafe (loan)	21	(3)
2017–2018	→ Espinho (loan)	26	(9)
2019–2024	Vizela	147	(21)
2024–	Vitória Guimarães	71	(10)

International career
2015	Portugal U19	3	(0)
- * Club domestic league appearances and goals as of 20:00, 8 November 2026 (UTC)

Fábio Samuel Amorim Silva (born 21 April 1996), known as Samu, is a Portuguese professional footballer who plays as a midfielder for Primeira Liga club Vitória de Guimarães, where he is captain.

== Club career ==
=== Boavista ===
Samu was born in Mozelos (Santa Maria da Feira), Aveiro District. He joined Boavista FC's youth system at the age of 14, from FC Porto.

Samu totalled just ten Primeira Liga appearances for the club over two and a half seasons, his first being a 1–0 away loss against C.F. União on 6 January 2016 where he came on as a 76th-minute substitute for Idrissa Mandiang. During this timeframe, he was also loaned to AD Fafe (LigaPro) and S.C. Espinho (third division).

=== Vizela ===
In July 2019, Samu signed with F.C. Vizela of the third tier. He helped the team to two consecutive promotions in two years, notably scoring eight goals – with eight assists – in the 2020–21 campaign.

Samu renewed his contract on 9 July 2021, with the new deal running until 2024. He scored his first goal in the Portuguese top flight on 6 November, in a 1–1 home draw with G.D. Estoril Praia. The following 6 February, his brace earned his side one point following a 2–2 draw at his first club as a senior.

=== Vitória Guimarães ===
On 5 June 2024, following Vizela's relegation, Samu agreed to a three-year contract at Vitória S.C. as a free agent. On 10 January 2026, he scored from a penalty to equalise an eventual 2–1 win over S.C. Braga in the final of the Taça da Liga for the club's first-ever victory in the competition; he also assisted Alioune Ndoye in the 83rd minute from a corner kick.

== International career ==
Samu represented Portugal at under-19 level.

== Honours ==
Vitória Guimarães

- Taça da Liga: 2025–26
