= João Mendes (footballer, born 2000) =

Portuguese footballer (born 2000)

Personal information
- Full name: João Miguel Teixeira Mendes
- Date of birth: 13 April 2000 (age 26)
- Place of birth: Marco de Canaveses, Portugal
- Height: 1.79 m (5 ft 10 in)
- Position: Left-back

Team information
- Current team: Vitória Guimarães
- Number: 13

Youth career
- 2008–2010: Académico Amarante
- 2010–2011: Tuías
- 2011–2013: Académico Amarante
- 2013–2014: Marco
- 2014–2018: Penafiel
- 2018–2019: Vitória Guimarães

Senior career*
Years	Team	Apps	(Gls)
2018	Penafiel B	8	(0)
2020–2021	Vitória Guimarães B	31	(2)
2021–2024	Porto B	72	(4)
2022–2024	Porto	6	(0)
2024–	Vitória Guimarães	73	(1)
- * Club domestic league appearances and goals as of 20:00, 8 November 2026 (UTC)

João Miguel Teixeira Mendes (born 13 April 2000) is a Portuguese professional footballer who plays as a left-back for Primeira Liga club Vitória de Guimarães.

== Club career ==
=== Early career ===
Mendes was born in Marco de Canaveses, Porto District. He spent the better part of his formative years at F.C. Penafiel and Vitória de Guimarães.

=== Porto ===
On 7 July 2021, Mendes joined FC Porto on a three-year contract, being assigned to the B team in the Liga Portugal 2. He made his debut as a professional on 7 August, featuring 90 minutes of a 2–2 home draw against C.D. Trofense.

Mendes' first competitive appearance for the main squad took place on 15 December 2021, as an 80th-minute substitute for Nanu in the 1–0 home win over Rio Ave F.C. in the group stage of the Taça da Liga as his team was already eliminated. A month later, he made his Primeira Liga bow by replacing Wendell late into a 4–1 away victory against B-SAD.

On 23 October 2022, Mendes scored his first second-tier goal for Porto's reserves, in a 3–0 win at Trofense. His second arrived the following 29 January, in the 2–1 away defeat of S.C. Covilhã.

=== Vitória Guimarães ===
Mendes returned to Vitória on 15 June 2024, signing a four-year deal. On 10 January 2026, in the League Cup final against S.C. Braga, he was sent off for two yellow cards; the second resulted in an injury-time penalty, but Charles Silva saved Rodrigo Zalazar's shot and Mendes' team won 2–1 for their first-ever title in the competition.

== Career statistics ==
As of match played 12 May 2024

Appearances and goals by club, season and competition
Club	Season	League			Taça de Portugal		Taça da Liga		Total	
Club	Season	Division	Apps	Goals	Apps	Goals	Apps	Goals	Apps	Goals
Penafiel B	2017–18	Porto FA – Elite Division	8	0	—		—		8	0
Vitória Guimarães B	2019–20	Campeonato de Portugal	6	0	—		—		6	0
Vitória Guimarães B	2020–21	Campeonato de Portugal	25	2	—		—		25	2
Vitória Guimarães B	Total		31	2	—		—		31	2
Porto B	2021–22	Liga Portugal 2	24	0	—		—		24	0
Porto B	2022–23	Liga Portugal 2	33	3	—		—		33	3
Porto B	2023–24	Liga Portugal 2	15	1	—		—		15	1
Porto B	Total		72	4	—		—		72	4
Porto	2021–22	Primeira Liga	1	0	0	0	1	0	2	0
Porto	2023–24	Primeira Liga	5	0	2	0	2	0	9	0
Porto	Total		6	0	2	0	3	0	11	0
Career total			117	6	2	0	3	0	122	6

== Honours ==
Porto

- Primeira Liga: 2021–22
- Taça de Portugal: 2023–24

Vitória Guimarães

- Taça da Liga: 2025–26
