= João Mendes (footballer, born 1994) =

Portuguese footballer (born 1994)

Personal information
- Full name: João Sabino Mendes Neto Saraiva
- Date of birth: 21 October 1994 (age 32)
- Place of birth: Matosinhos, Portugal
- Height: 1.75 m (5 ft 9 in)
- Position: Attacking midfielder

Youth career
- 2002–2007: Leixões
- 2007–2008: Pedras Rubras
- 2008–2012: Leixões
- 2012–2013: Gondomar

Senior career*
Years	Team	Apps	(Gls)
2013–2014	Gondomar	15	(2)
2014–2015	Gouveia	30	(5)
2015	Nogueirense	7	(1)
2015–2016	Operário	19	(4)
2016–2019	Oliveirense	56	(5)
2018–2019	→ Tondela (loan)	4	(0)
2019–2021	Tondela	6	(0)
2019–2020	→ Académica (loan)	20	(3)
2021	→ Estoril (loan)	2	(0)
2021–2023	Chaves	55	(5)
2023–2025	Vitória Guimarães	58	(11)
2025–2026	Kayserispor	26	(0)
- * Club domestic league appearances and goals as of 20:55, 28 May 2026 (UTC)

João Sabino Mendes Neto Saraiva (born 21 October 1994), known as Mendes, is a Portuguese professional footballer who plays as an attacking midfielder.

== Club career ==
Born in Matosinhos, Porto District, Mendes played youth football for four clubs, notably having two spells at local Leixões SC. He spent his first four seasons as a senior in the third division, representing in quick succession Gondomar SC, CD Gouveia, A.D. Nogueirense, CD Operário and U.D. Oliveirense. In 2016–17, he scored three goals in 27 matches to help the latter team to promotion to the LigaPro.

Mendes made his professional debut with Oliveirense on 27 August 2017, coming on as a second-half substitute in a 1–0 away loss against F.C. Famalicão. He scored his first goal in division two the following 11 April, but in a 3–2 away defeat to C.D. Cova da Piedade.

In summer 2018, Mendes signed with Primeira Liga side C.D. Tondela on a one-year loan. He appeared in his first game in the competition on 2 December, replacing Bruno Monteiro in the first half of the 3–2 loss at Portimonense SC; the move was made permanent at the end of that spell.

Mendes was loaned to Académica de Coimbra of the second tier on 30 August 2019. In February 2021, also on loan, he joined G.D. Estoril Praia in the same league.

Mendes remained in division two for 2021–22, on a contract at G.D. Chaves. He contributed 24 appearances (26 overall) and three goals to help them return to the top flight, adding 31, two goals and two assists in the following campaign as they comfortably retained their status.

On 14 June 2023, Mendes joined Vitória S.C. on a two-year deal. On 2 September, he was sent off with a straight red card early into an eventual 4–0 away loss to S.L. Benfica. On 8 October, he scored a first-half brace in the 3–1 victory at Famalicão.

Mendes moved abroad for the first time in his career on 9 August 2025, with the 30-year-old signing a two-year contract with Turkish Süper Lig club Kayserispor.

== Career statistics ==
As of match played 13 April 2024

Appearances and goals by club, season and competition
Club	Season	League			Taça de Portugal		Taça da Liga		Europe		Total	
Club	Season	Division	Apps	Goals	Apps	Goals	Apps	Goals	Apps	Goals	Apps	Goals
Gondomar	2013–14	Campeonato Nacional de Seniores	15	2	1	0	—		—		16	2
Gouveia	2014–15	Campeonato Nacional de Seniores	30	5	1	0	—		—		31	5
Nogueirense	2015–16	Campeonato de Portugal	7	1	1	0	—		—		8	1
Operário	2015–16	Campeonato de Portugal	19	4	0	0	—		—		19	4
Oliveirense	2016–17	Campeonato de Portugal	27	3	2	0	—		—		29	3
Oliveirense	2017–18	LigaPro	29	2	1	0	4	0	—		34	2
Oliveirense	Total		56	5	3	0	4	0	—		63	5
Tondela (loan)	2018–19	Primeira Liga	4	0	2	0	3	0	—		9	0
Tondela	2019–20	Primeira Liga	0	0	0	0	0	0	—		0	0
Tondela	2020–21	Primeira Liga	6	0	1	1	—		—		7	1
Tondela	Total		10	0	3	1	3	0	—		16	1
Académica (loan)	2019–20	LigaPro	20	3	2	0	0	0	—		22	3
Estoril (loan)	2020–21	Liga Portugal 2	2	0	1	0	0	0	—		3	0
Chaves	2021–22	Liga Portugal 2	24	3	1	0	1	0	—		26	3
Chaves	2022–23	Primeira Liga	31	2	0	0	2	0	—		33	2
Chaves	Total		55	5	1	0	3	0	—		59	5
Vitória Guimarães	2023–24	Primeira Liga	26	7	5	0	0	0	2 (Note: Appearances in UEFA Europa Conference League)	0	33	7
Career total			240	32	18	1	10	0	2	0	270	33

== Honours ==
Estoril

- Liga Portugal 2: 2020–21
