= F.C. Felgueiras =

Portuguese football club

Felgueiras
- Full name: Futebol Clube de Felgueiras
- Founded: 16 August 1936
- Dissolved: 2005
- Ground: Estádio Dr. Machado de Matos, Felgueiras
- Capacity: 7,540
- Chairman: Eduardo Teixeira
- League: Campeonato de Portugal

Futebol Clube de Felgueiras was a Portuguese football club from Felgueiras. The club was founded on 16 August 1936 and ended in 2005 due to financial problems. The club played at the Estádio Dr. Machado de Matos which was their home since the club was founded in the 1930s. José Fonte and former Portuguese international footballers Fernando Meira and Sérgio Conceição are one of the most famous players to ever play for Felgueiras. Bakero played there in his youth.

== History ==
During a good portion of the 1980s, FC Felgueiras participated regularly in national championships. In the 1982–83 season, it got its first major national stint, after winning the Second Division and therefore achieving promotion.

In 1991–92, under the command of Mário Reis, Felgueiras won the Second Division northern zone league, again reaching the second level. It was also during that decade that the club under the management of Jorge Jesus reached the pinnacle of its sporting achievements, being promoted to the top flight. In the 1995–96 Primeira Divisão the club finished sixteenth place and were relegated. The club then suffered a hefty decline down the football pyramid that lead them to the regional leagues and eventually extinction. A new football club, F.C. Felgueiras 1932 was created in 2006 and achieved promotion to the Terceira Divisão in the 2011–12 season.

== Honours ==
- Taça de Honra do Porto: 1
  - 1984–85

== League and Cup history ==
Season		Pos.	Pl.	W	D	L	GS	GA	P	Cup	Notes
1992–93	2H	10	34	10	12	12	30	35	32	Round 3	
1993–94	2H	6	34	12	13	9	40	34	37	Round 4	
1994–95	2H	3	34	17	10	7	45	24	54	Round 5	Promoted
1995–96	1D	16	34	8	9	17	29	47	33	Round 6	Relegated
1996–97	2H	4	34	14	12	8	41	33	54	Round 3	
1997–98	2H	9	34	11	12	11	38	42	45	Round 5	
1998–99	2H	9	34	12	14	8	60	40	50	Round 4	
1999–00	2H	7	34	14	9	11	42	36	51	Round 6	
2000–01	2H	16	34	8	10	16	40	50	51	Round 6	

=== Current Squad ===
As of 25 September 2026

Note: Flags indicate national team as defined under FIFA eligibility rules; some limited exceptions apply. Players may hold more than one non-FIFA nationality.

No.	Pos.	Nation	Player
3	DF	POR	João Pinto
4	DF	BRA	Dudu Cruz
5	DF	POR	Afonso Peixoto
6	MF	POR	Henrique Martins
7	FW	ESP	Mario Rivas
8	MF	POR	Landinho
9	FW	POR	Tiago Leite
10	MF	BRA	Michel
11	FW	POR	João Costa
12	GK	CAN	Izan Server
13	FW	POR	Joãozinho
14	GK	BRA	Mateus Pasinato
15	DF	POR	Armando Lopes
16	MF	ANG	Beni Jetour
17	DF	POR	Filipe Cruz

No.	Pos.	Nation	Player
19	FW	BRA	Lucas Duarte
20	MF	POR	Diogo Batista
22	DF	POR	Samuel Vivas
23	DF	POR	Afonso Freitas
25	GK	BRA	Felipe Scheibig
30	FW	GBS	Jovane Camará
31	GK	POR	Eduardo Esteves
33	DF	BRA	Dário
45	DF	CIV	Bakary Haidara
47	FW	BRA	João Bom
70	DF	MAR	Bilal Ouacharaf
77	MF	POR	Francisco França
80	MF	POR	Tiago Ventura
86	MF	POR	Marco Ribeiro
87	MF	BRA	Samuel
88	FW	BRA	Gustavo Mendes

== Managerial history ==
- (Portugal) Diamantino Miranda (1998 – 2000)
- (Portugal) Diamantino Miranda (2003 – 2005)
