= Pedreira =

Pedreira may refer to:

== Brazil ==
- Pedreira, São Paulo, a municipality in São Paulo state
- Pedreira (district of São Paulo), a district of the city of São Paulo
- Pedreira River, a tributary of the Amazon River in Amapá
- Pedreira Esporte Clube, an association football club in Mosqueiro, Belém, Pará

== Portugal ==
- Pedreira, Rande e Sernande, a parish in the Felgueiras municipality
- Pedreira (Felgueiras), a former parish in the Felgueiras municipality
- Pedreira (Tomar), a parish in the Tomar Municipality
- Lagoa da Pedreira, a lake in the city of Póvoa de Varzim

== See also ==
- Pedreira (surname)
- Pedreiras (disambiguation)
