= Sernande =

Former parish in Portugal

- Civil parish
- Coat of arms

- Location in Portugal
- Coordinates: 41°20′30″N 8°13′28″W
- Country: Portugal
- Region: Norte
- Intermunic. comm.: Tâmega e Sousa
- District: Porto
- Municipality: Felgueiras

Area
  - Total: 1.35 km^{2} (0.52 sq mi)

Population (2011)
  - Total: 941
  - Density: 697/km^{2} (1,810/sq mi)
- Time zone: UTC+00:00 (WET)
  - Summer (DST): UTC+01:00 (WEST)

Sernande is a Portuguese locality in the municipality of Felgueiras which was the administrative centre of the former parish of Sernande, a parish covering an area of 1.35 km^{2} (0.52 sq mi) with a population of 941 (2011), and therefore a population density of 697 inhabitants per km².

The parish of Sernande was abolished in 2013 as part of a national administrative reform, so that, together with the parishes of Pedreira and Rande, it could form a new parish called the Union of the Parishes of Pedreira, Rande e Sernande, with its administrative centre in Pedreira.

Formerly known as São João Baptista de Sernande, it belonged to the former municipality of Unhão. In 1836 Unhão was abolished and Sernande was incorporated into the municipality of Barrosas, which was also abolished in 1852, after which it became part of the municipality of Felgueiras, staying there ever since.

== Demography ==
Population of the parish of Sernande
| 1864 | 1878 | 1890 | 1900 | 1911 | 1920 | 1930 | 1940 | 1950 | 1960 | 1970 | 1981 | 1991 | 2001 | 2011 |
| 376 | 445 | 378 | 371 | 418 | 421 | 464 | 569 | 626 | 568 | 601 | 567 | 737 | 891 | 941 |

Distribution by Age Groups
| Census year | 0-14 | 15-24 | 25-64 | > 65 |
| 2001 | 228 | 146 | 436 | 81 |
| 2011 | 192 | 133 | 514 | 102 |
