= Rande (Felgueiras) =

Former parish in Portugal

- Civil parish
- Coat of arms

- Location in Portugal
- Coordinates: 41°19′47″N 8°13′50″W
- Country: Portugal
- Region: Norte
- Intermunic. comm.: Tâmega e Sousa
- District: Porto
- Municipality: Felgueiras

Area
  - Total: 2.06 km^{2} (0.80 sq mi)

Population (2011)
  - Total: 982
  - Density: 477/km^{2} (1,230/sq mi)
- Time zone: UTC+00:00 (WET)
  - Summer (DST): UTC+01:00 (WEST)

Rande is a Portuguese locality in the municipality of Felgueiras which was the administrative centre of the former parish of Rande, a parish covering an area of 2.06 km^{2} (0.80 sq mi) with a population of 982 (2011), giving it a population density of 476.7 inhabitants per km².

The parish of Rande was abolished in 2013 as part of a national administrative reform, so that, together with the parishes of Pedreira and Sernande, it could form a new parish called Pedreira, Rande e Sernande, with its administrative centre in Pedreira.

Formerly known as São Tiago de Rande, it formed part of the municipality of Unhão, which was abolished in 1836. It then became part of the municipality of Barrosas until it was also abolished in 1852, after which it was transferred to Felgueiras, to which it has belonged ever since.

It is the birthplace of Francisco Sarmento Pimentel, who made the first flight from Portugal to India, of the musicologist Luís Rodrigues and of the historian Armando Pinto, author of numerous works, a chronicler, community leader and a driving force behind the development of Longra, a town that was part of Rande, and the founder of the local Casa do Povo and museum.

== Demography ==
Population of the parish of Rande
1864	1878	1890	1900	1911	1920	1930	1940	1950	1960	1970	1981	1991	2001	2011
424	524	484	494	606	565	606	677	692	765	684	745	761	962	982

Distribution by Age Groups
Census year	0-14	15-24	25-64	> 65
2001	213	149	502	98
2011	151	156	559	116
