= Torno, Portugal =

Torno
- Civil parish
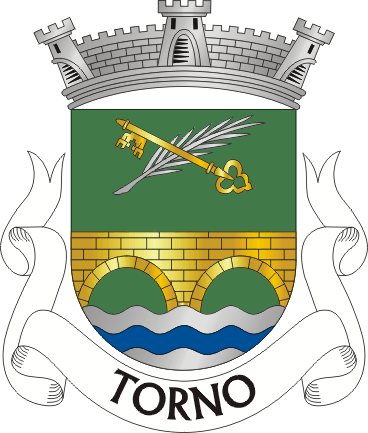
- Coat of arms

- Location in Portugal
- Coordinates: 41.290°N 8.213°W
- Country: Portugal
- Region: Norte
- Intermunic. comm.: Tâmega e Sousa
- District: Porto
- Municipality: Lousada

Area
  - Total: 3.75 km^{2} (1.45 sq mi)

Population (2011)
  - Total: 2,452
  - Density: 650/km^{2} (1,700/sq mi)
- Time zone: UTC+00:00 (WET)
  - Summer (DST): UTC+01:00 (WEST)

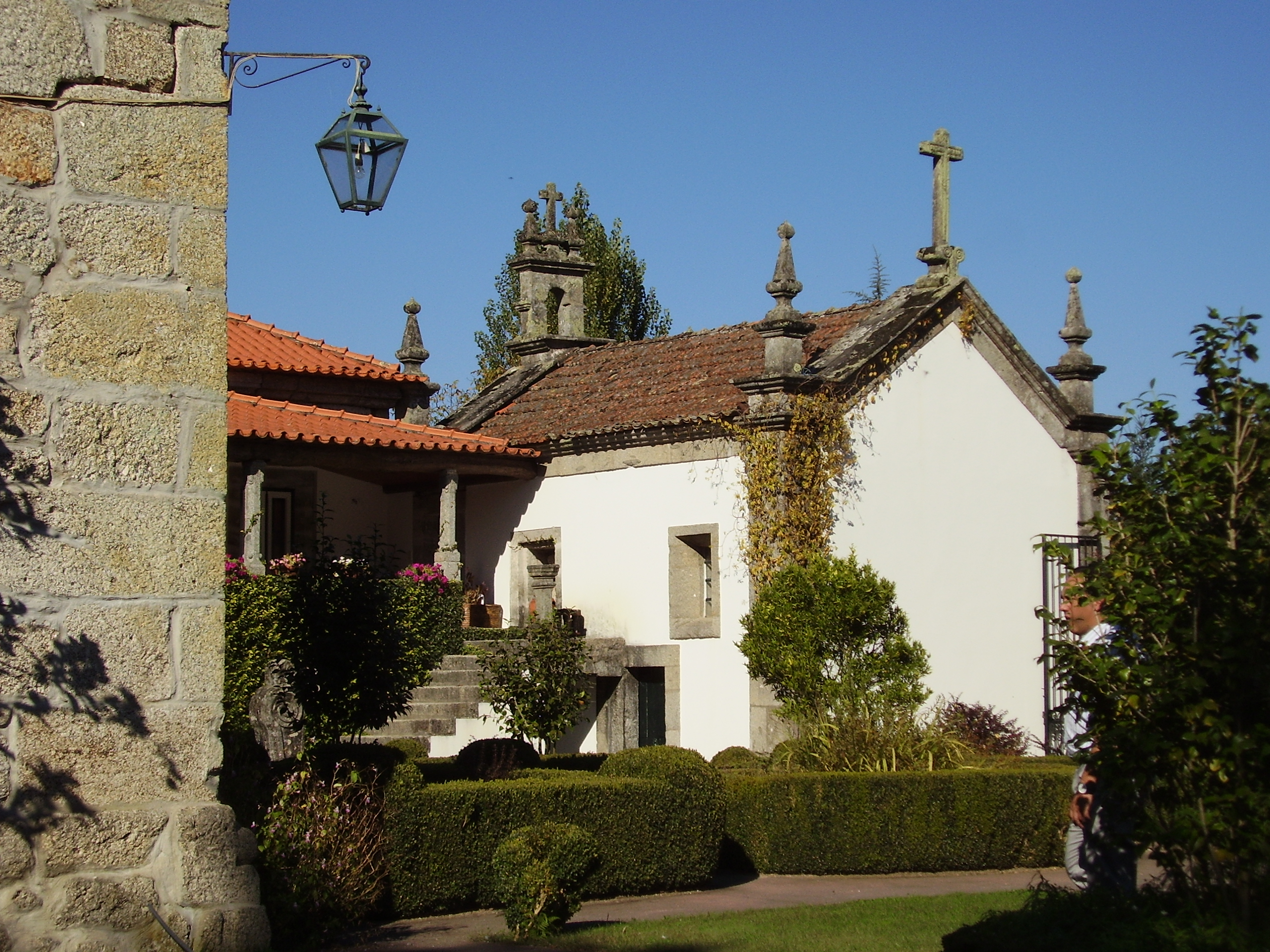

Torno (also known as Aparecida) is a parish in the municipality of Lousada, Portugal. The population in 2011 was 2,542, in an area of 3.75 km^{2}.

Situated in the Eastern part of the municipality, Torno is limited in the south by Vilar do Torno e Alentém, in the west by Cernadelo, in the southeast by municipality of Amarante and in the north by municipality of Felgueiras.
