= Covas =

Covas may refer to the following places:

== In Portugal ==
- Figueiras e Covas, a parish in the municipality of Lousada
- Covas (Tábua), a parish in the municipality of Tábua
- Covas (Vila Nova de Cerveira), a parish in the municipality of Vila Nova de Cerveira
- Covas (Vila Verde), a parish in the municipality of Vila Verde

== In Spain ==
- Covas, Viveiro, a parish of Viveiro, Lugo Province

== Surname ==
- Covas (surname)
