= Nevogilde =

Nevogilde may refer to:

- Nevogilde (Lousada), a parish of the municipality of Lousada, Portugal.
- Nevogilde (Porto), a parish of the municipality of Porto, Portugal.
- Nevogilde (Vila Verde), a parish of the municipality of Vila Verde, Portugal.
