= Bakero (footballer) =

Portuguese footballer (born 1978)

Personal information
- Full name: Orlando José Lemos Martins
- Date of birth: 2 April 1978 (age 48)
- Place of birth: Portugal
- Positions: Midfielder; winger

Youth career
- Felgueiras

Senior career*
Years	Team	Apps	(Gls)
–1998	Felgueiras	38	(3)
1998–1999	Leiria	33	(2)
1999–2000	Sevilla	0	(0)
2000–2001	Marítimo	23	(1)
2001–2002	Braga	15	(0)
2002–2003	Salgueiros	24	(0)
2003–2004	Bragança	9	(0)
2004–2005	Maia	16	(0)
2005–2007	Caçadores das Taipas		
2007–2008	Penafiel	29	(4)
2008–2009	Nea Salamis		
2008–2009	Vizela	13	(2)
2009–2010	Espinho	10	(0)
2009–2010	Lousada	10	(0)
2010–2015	Felgueiras	106	(17)
- * Club domestic league appearances and goals

Bakero (born 2 April 1978 in Portugal) is a Portuguese retired footballer.
