= Póvoa de Varzim City Park =

Park in Póvoa de Varzim, Portugal

Parque da Cidade
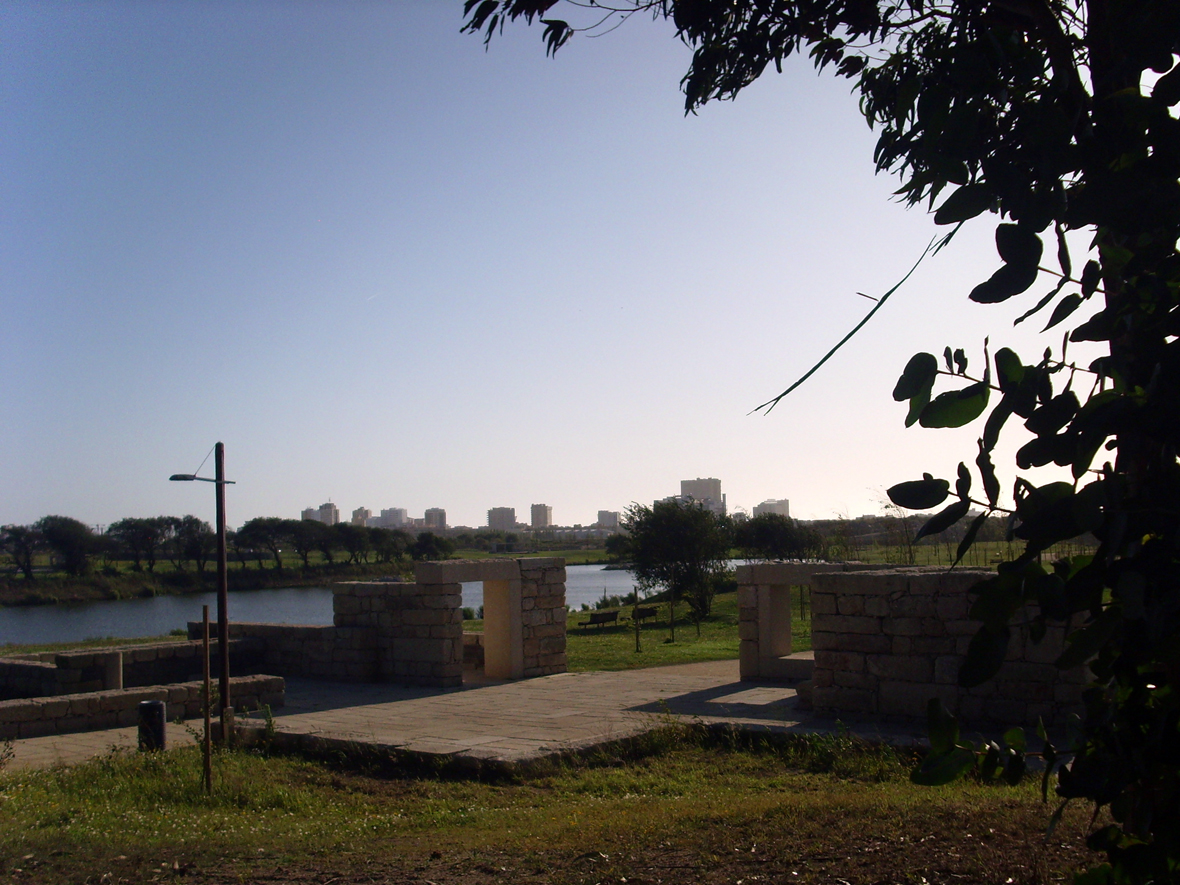
- View from a station in the park
- Type: Municipal
- Location: Póvoa de Varzim
- Area: 30 hectares (74 acres) when complete: 90 hectares (220 acres)
- Created: 2009

The Póvoa de Varzim City Park (Parque da Cidade da Póvoa de Varzim) is an urban park of Póvoa de Varzim in Portugal.

The park is located in a former plain, where a small stream, farms, and farmhouses existed. It includes landscaped hills, a lake, an island, and pathways. The stream was recovered, and wildlife started inhabiting the area. Small bridges, squares, and rustic buildings were built. The park includes the Póvoa de Varzim Municipal Stadium.

== History ==
The project for a city park in Póvoa de Varzim started early in the 20th century, and was planned for the area around Lagoa Beach in the location of a dried lagoon, but local real estate companies pressured for the urban development of the beachfront and a small underdeveloped area for the park remained. In 1997, a new project further inland started being planned. The new site was a much larger area and located between the A28 freeway (motorway) and Lake Pedreira.

The new project was part of the urbanization policy of mayor Macedo Vieira and was designed by landscape architect Sidónio Pardal, the most notable Portuguese landscape architect, who designed Porto City Park (1993-2002). When complete, Póvoa de Varzim City Park will be one of the largest urban parks in Portugal with 90 hectares (220 acres), similar in size to Porto City Park, with 83 hectares (210 acres) and considered the largest urban park in Portugal. The landscape architect referred to Póvoa's development area as being "dull, inhospitable, flat and exposed to the motorway", and due to this several slopes had to be erected.

The Sports City project, the first phase, started in 2003 with the construction of the City Stadium. In 2005, the football fields with artificial lawn, behind the stadium, opened. The 19 hectare Leisure Park area started being built in 2007 and was completed for the 2009 festivities of Póvoa de Varzim Holiday. The construction was slow and phased, mostly due to existence of 150 privately owned lands. The funding for the project was from the Póvoa de Varzim City Hall's own funds and the remaining 25% was from the Tourism Fund, which manages the taxes collected from Póvoa Casino.

== Landscaping and facilities ==
The east park is a leisure park with 19 hectare and a 2 hectare central lake. It is surrounded by 3 kilometres (1.9 mi) of ways and 20 stations. These stations are mostly granite and shale constructions, used for resting, some shaped as small squares or amphitheaters and others for more intimate stays.

Although bathrooms, a fitness trail and parking spaces are currently available, the parkland has no bars or similar services, and this option was part of the development policy who wanted people to focus on the great lawn areas and nature itself. The East Park is located in Sencadas area, in Amorim Parish. The pedestrian access, for people arriving from Póvoa de Varzim outskirts in Amorim, is made throw the Sencadas Pontoon, over the A28 freeway (motorway).

The West development area of the city park relies upon the recovery of Lagoa da Pedreira, the expansion of Avenida 25 de Abril crossing the park in a trench, and a bikeway from the park to nearby Lagoa Beach.

The Sports City of Póvoa de Varzim includes the municipal stadium of Póvoa de Varzim, the surrounding sports fields, mostly used by the local junior people's soccer league of Póvoa de Varzim. The municipal stadium is surrounded by hills and bushes in an attempt to reduce the venue's visual impact. The stadium landscaping was designed by Sidonio Pardal with the support of the architect Vítor Mogadouro who designed the building. The Sports City has a plan to include the Varzim S.C. stadium and the Sports Complex of Clube Desportivo da Póvoa, both are private developments.

City park

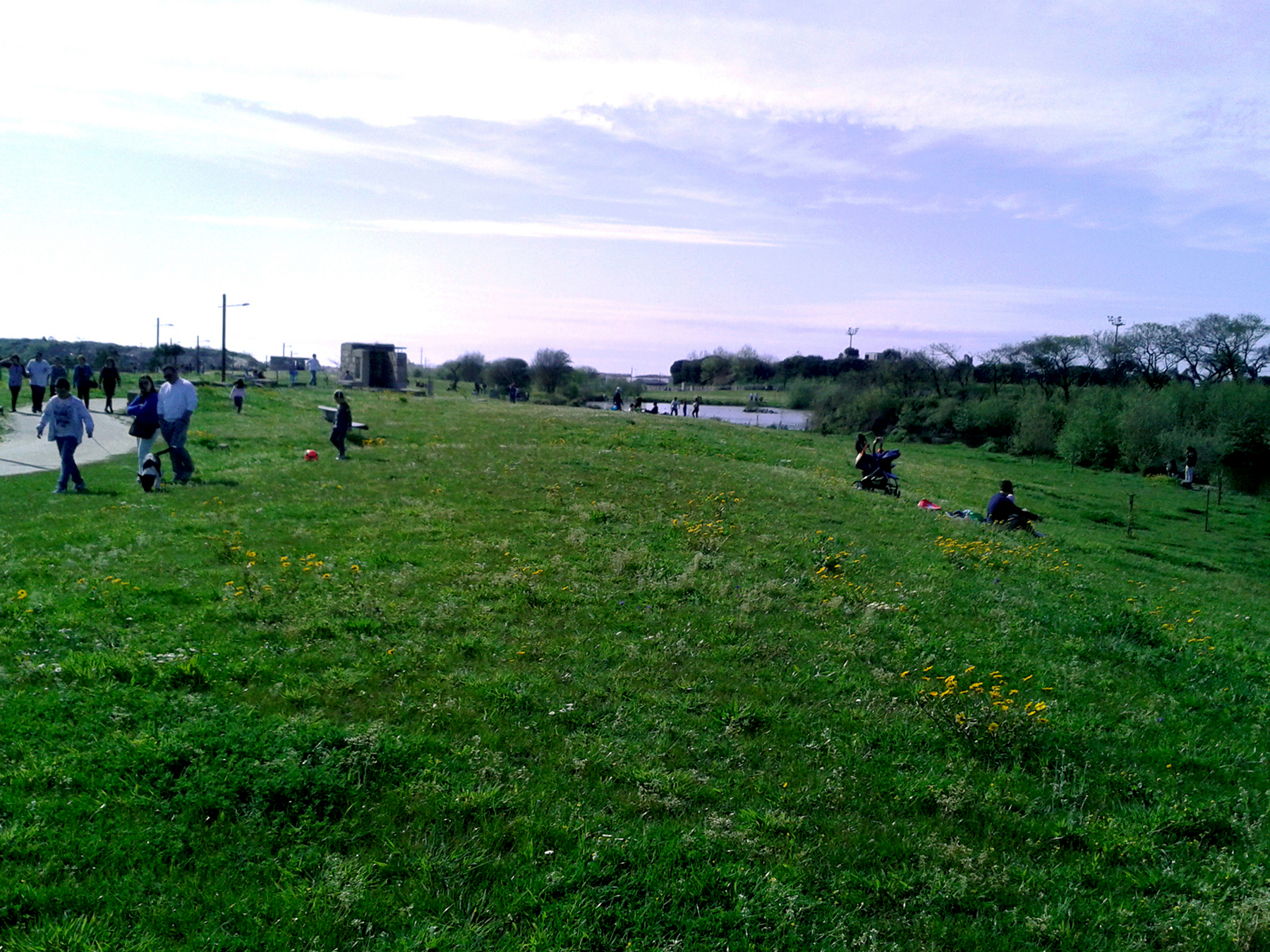
The great lawn area.

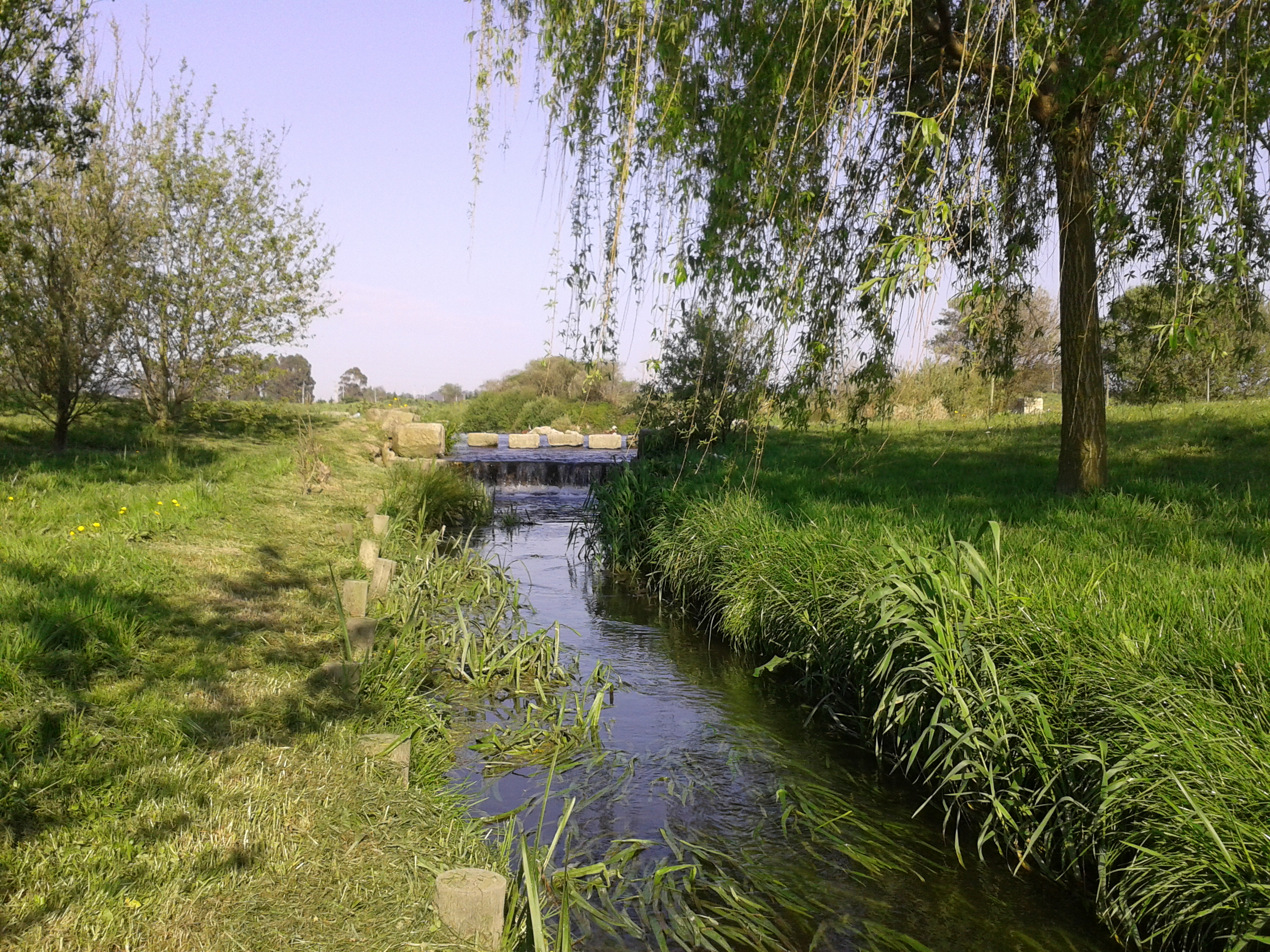
The lake's outflow stream.

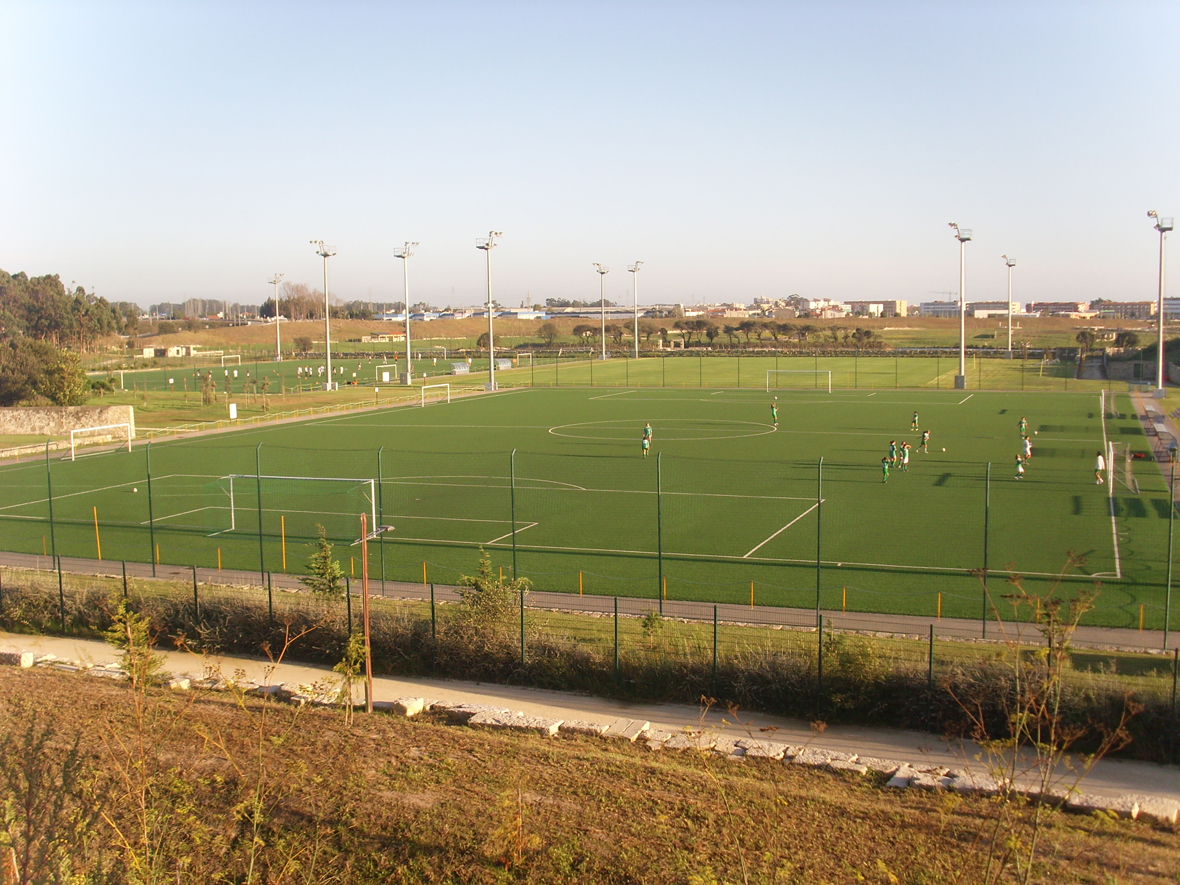
The football fields are mostly used for the junior soccer league of Póvoa de Varzim

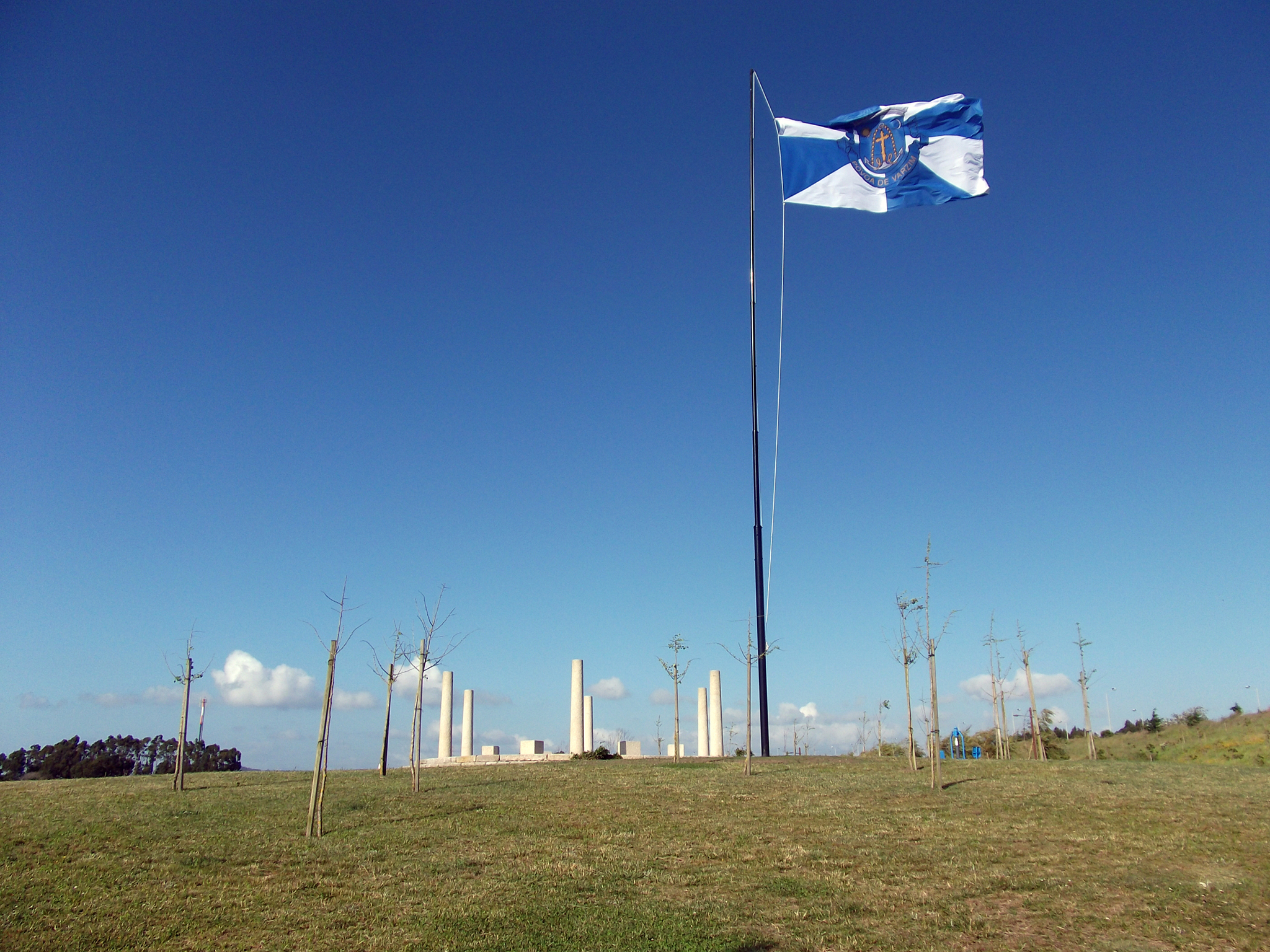
Giant flag of Póvoa de Varzim waving

== The Lake and wildlife ==
The lake has a central island and outlying rocks with an expressive treeline which predate the lake and the park itself. The lake is only 60 centimetres (24 in) deep.

The landscaped lake was created by simply retaining the water from an existing stream, the Esteiro, whose source is located at Cividade Hill and crosses the park from southeast to the northwest. The stream is also the lake's primary outflow. Part of the water to fill the lake was also got using groundwater. The stream, in the current lake-bed, was at most 1.5 metres (4.9 ft) wide.

There are 28 species of trees. The lake's easily visible wildlife include birds, freshwater fish, reptiles, and mammals. Reptiles found in the park include the Iberian emerald lizard, the ocellated lizard, and Mediterranean pond turtles. Mammals that reached it were the European otter, southwestern water voles and weasels. Common and easily visible birds are mallards, Egyptian geese, great cormorants, domestic geese and swans, much of which bred in the park. Other common species include blackbirds, the moorhen, the coot, the black-winged stilt, the magpie, and several other species. Making it a spot for birdwatchers who photograph other species such as the squacco heron, the cattle egret, the hoopoe, the gadwall, the northern shoveler, the wryneck, and the tufted duck.

Lake's wildlife

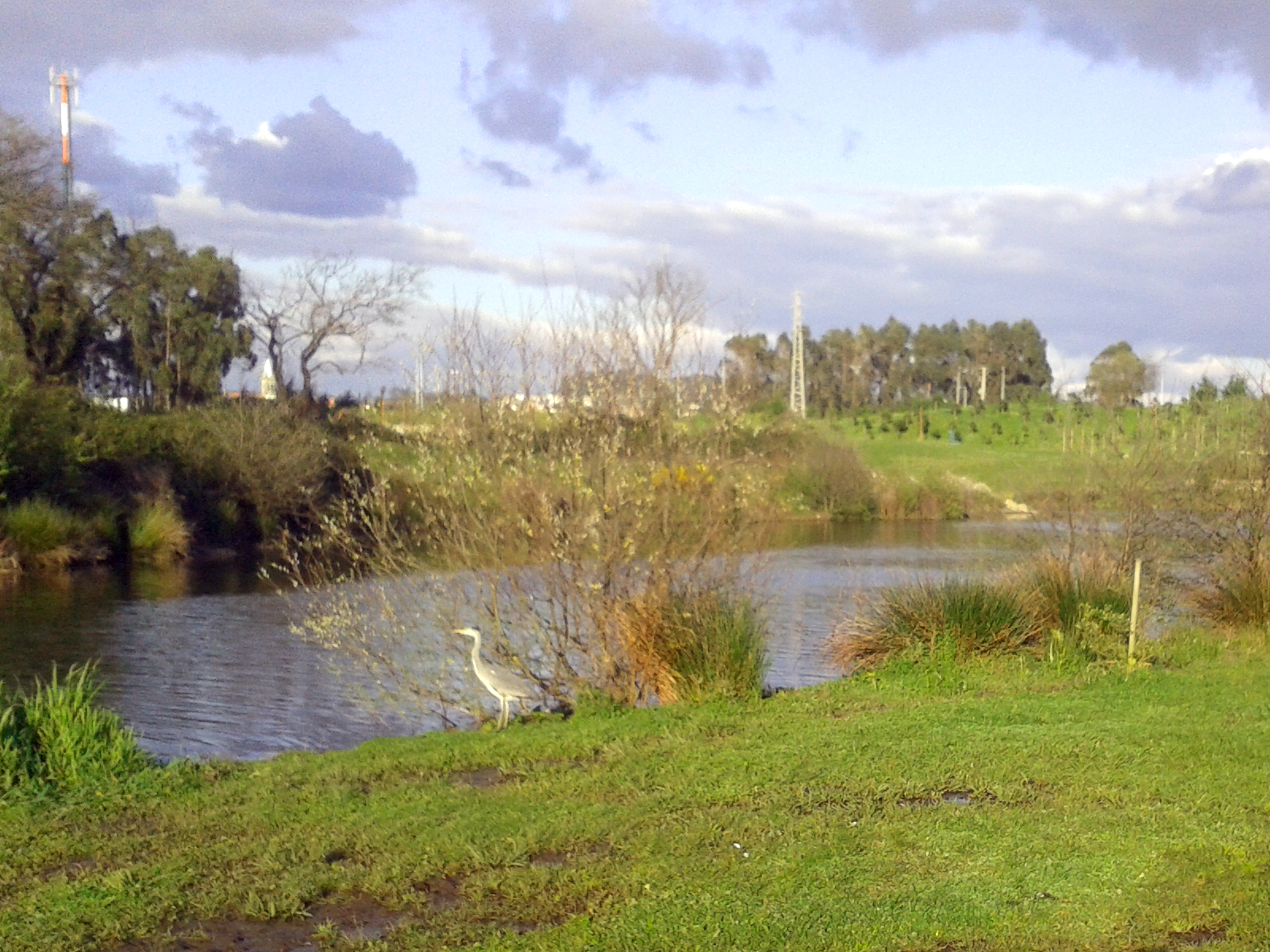
A grey heron near the lake's shore.

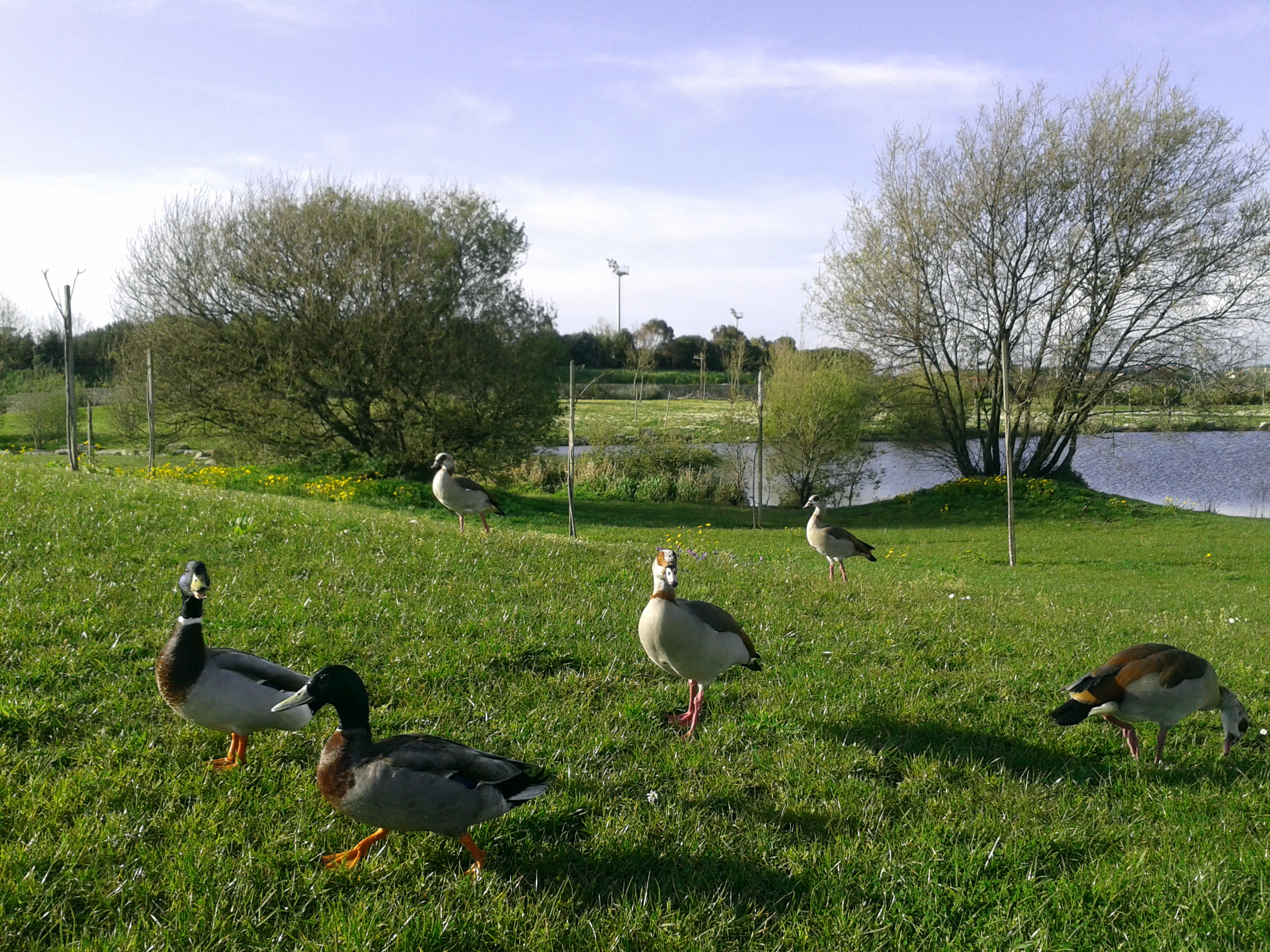
Egyptian geese and Wild ducks.

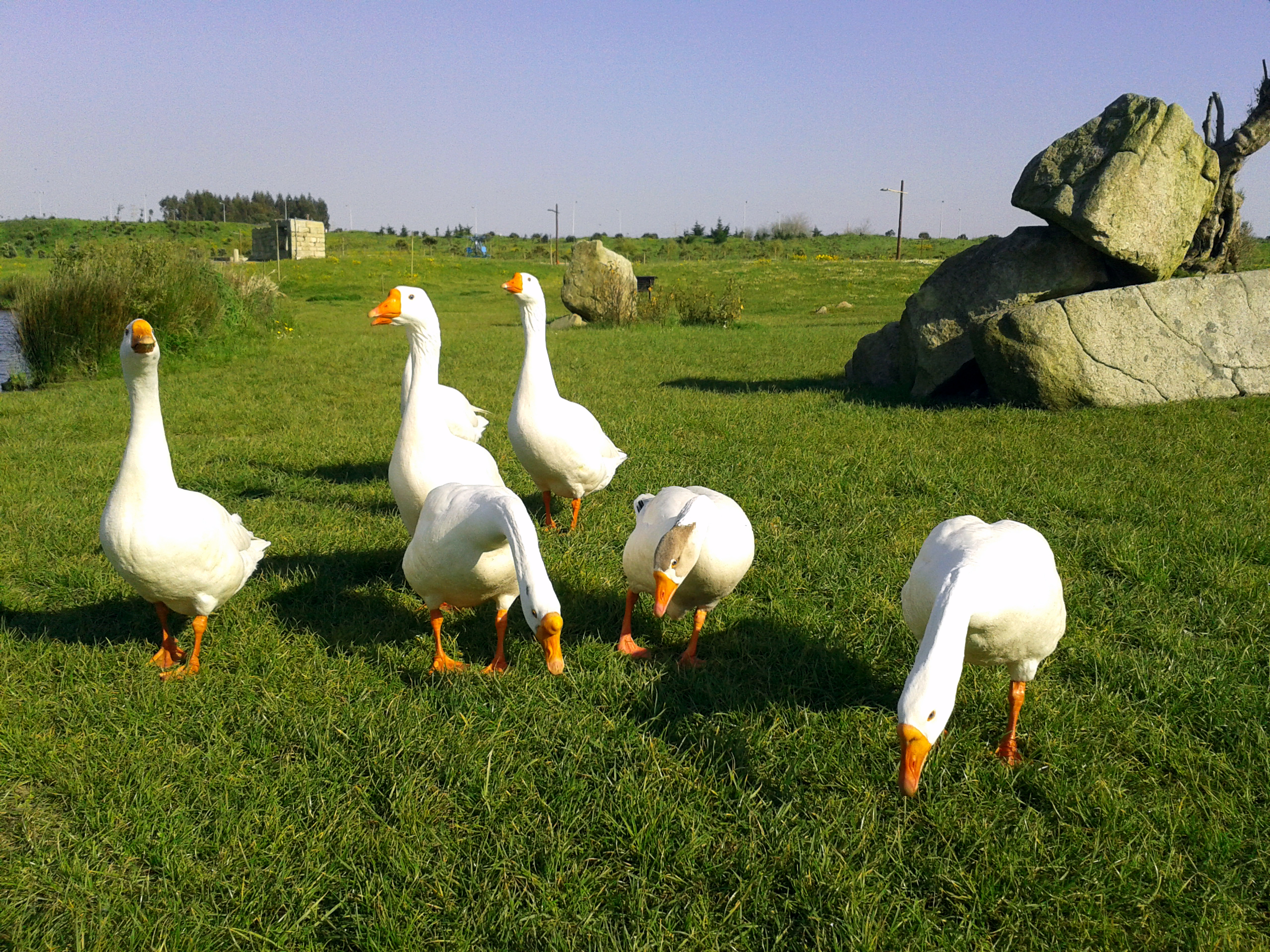
Domestic geese.

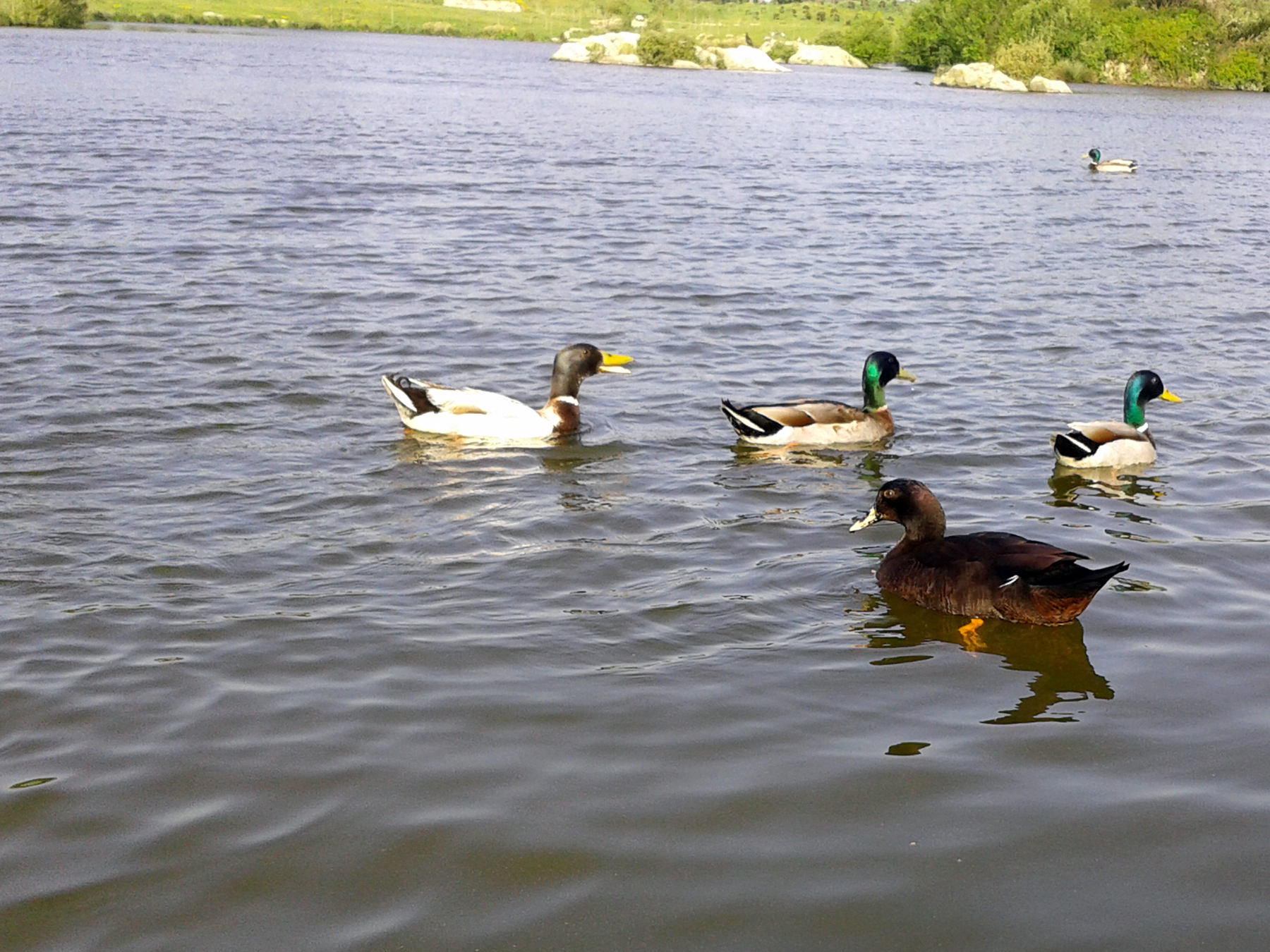
In the forefront, a Hartlaub's duck after arrival in the park.

=== City park bird-watching ===
A partial listing of bird species observed in the City Park, both natives and exotics:

Ducks, geese and swans

- Alopochen aegyptiacus
- Anas crecca
- Anas penelope
- Anas platyrhynchos
- Anser anser domesticus
- Aythya fuligula
- Cygnus atratus
- Cygnus olor
- Tachybaptus ruficollis
- Tadorna ferruginea

Rails

- Fulica atra
- Gallinula chloropus

Herons

- Ardea cinerea
- Ardeola ralloides
- Bubulcus ibis

Larger passerines

- Pica pica
- Sturnus unicolor
- Turdus merula

Smaller passerines

- Aegithalos caudatus
- Anthus pratensis
- Carduelis cannabina
- Carduelis carduelis
- Carduelis chloris
- Cisticola juncidis
- Cyanistes caeruleus
- Erithacus rubecula
- Estrilda astrild
- Ficedula hypoleuca
- Motacilla flava
- Motacilla alba
- Oenanthe oenanthe
- Parus major
- Passer domesticus
- Phoenicurus ochruros
- Phylloscopus collybita
- Phylloscopus ibericus
- Periparus ater
- Prunella modularis
- Riparia riparia
- Saxicola rubetra
- Saxicola rubicola
- Serinus serinus
- Troglodytes troglodytes
- Vidua macroura

shorebirds

- Actitis hypoleucos
- Calidris alpina
- Charadrius dubius
- Charadrius hiaticula
- Himantopus himantopus
- Limosa limosa
- Philomachus pugnax
- Tringa glareola
- Tringa totanus

Seabirds

- Chlidonias niger
- Larus canus
- Larus delawarensis
- Larus michahellis
- Larus fuscus
- Larus ridibundus
- Phalacrocorax carbo
- Sternula albifrons
- Sterna hirundo

other

- Alcedo atthis
- Buteo buteo
- Ciconia ciconia
- Cuculus canorus
- Upupa epops
