= Zamorano (Portuguese footballer) =

Portuguese footballer

Personal information
- Full name: Frederico Filipe Teixeira Ribeiro
- Date of birth: 5 April 1982 (age 44)
- Place of birth: Felgueiras, Portugal
- Height: 1.67 m (5 ft 6 in)
- Position: Midfielder

Youth career
- 1994–1999: Felgueiras

Senior career*
Years	Team	Apps	(Gls)
1999–2002	Felgueiras	93	(1)
2002–2004	Leixões	69	(3)
2004–2007	Estrela Amadora	54	(0)
2007–2009	Trofense	42	(0)
2009–2010	Gondomar	27	(1)
2010–2011	Penafiel	6	(0)
2011	Boavista	0	(0)
2012	Académico Felgueiras	19	(0)
2012–2015	Felgueiras 1932	66	(2)
Total		376	(7)

International career
1998	Portugal U15	11	(1)
1998–1999	Portugal U16	10	(1)
2000	Portugal U17	6	(0)
2000–2001	Portugal U18	7	(2)
- * Club domestic league appearances and goals

Frederico Filipe Teixeira Ribeiro (born 5 April 1982 in Felgueiras, Porto District), known as Zamorano, is a Portuguese former professional footballer. Mainly a right midfielder, he could also play as a right-back.
