= Cernadelo e Lousada (São Miguel e Santa Margarida) =

- Civil parish
- Location in Portugal
- Coordinates: 41.30°N 8.24°W
- Country: Portugal
- Region: Norte
- Intermunic. comm.: Tâmega e Sousa
- District: Porto
- Municipality: Lousada

Area
  - Total: 7.34 km^{2} (2.83 sq mi)

Population (2011)
  - Total: 2,166
  - Density: 300/km^{2} (760/sq mi)
- Time zone: UTC+00:00 (WET)
  - Summer (DST): UTC+01:00 (WEST)

Cernadelo e Lousada (São Miguel e Santa Margarida) is a civil parish in the municipality of Lousada, Portugal. It was formed in 2013 by the merger of the former parishes Cernadelo, Lousada (São Miguel) and Lousada (Santa Margarida). The population in 2011 was 2,166, in an area of 7.34 km².
