= Pedreira (Felgueiras) =

Former parish in Portugal

- Civil parish
- Coat of arms

- Location in Portugal
- Coordinates: 41°19′55″N 8°13′13″W
- Country: Portugal
- Region: Norte
- Intermunic. comm.: Tâmega e Sousa
- District: Porto
- Municipality: Felgueiras

Area
  - Total: 3.57 km^{2} (1.38 sq mi)

Population (2011)
  - Total: 1,564
  - Density: 438/km^{2} (1,130/sq mi)
- Time zone: UTC+00:00 (WET)
  - Summer (DST): UTC+01:00 (WEST)

Pedreira is a Portuguese locality in the municipality of Felgueiras which was the administrative centre of the former parish of Pedreira, a parish covering an area of 3.57 km^{2} (1.38 sq mi) with a population of 1,564 (2011) and a population density of 438.1 inhabitants per km².

It was partially included within the area of the village of Longra until it was abolished in 2013 as part of a national administrative reform, so that, together with the parishes of Rande and Sernande, it could form a new parish called Pedreira, Rande and Sernande, of which it is the administrative centre.

Formerly known as Santa Marinha de Pedreira, it formed part of the now-defunct municipality of Unhão until 1836.

== Demography ==
Population of the parish of Pedreira
1864	1878	1890	1900	1911	1920	1930	1940	1950	1960	1970	1981	1991	2001	2011
686	689	723	687	730	693	740	829	998	1 109	1 254	1 555	1 473	1 725	1 564

Distribution by Age Groups
Age group	0-14	15-24	25-64	> 65
2001	385	302	868	170
2011	259	248	872	185
