= Casais =

Casais may refer to the following places in Portugal:

- Casais (Lousada), a parish in the municipality of Lousada
- Casais (Tomar), a parish in the municipality of Tomar
- Casais do Douro
