= Antonio Rivas (Spanish footballer) =

Spanish footballer and manager

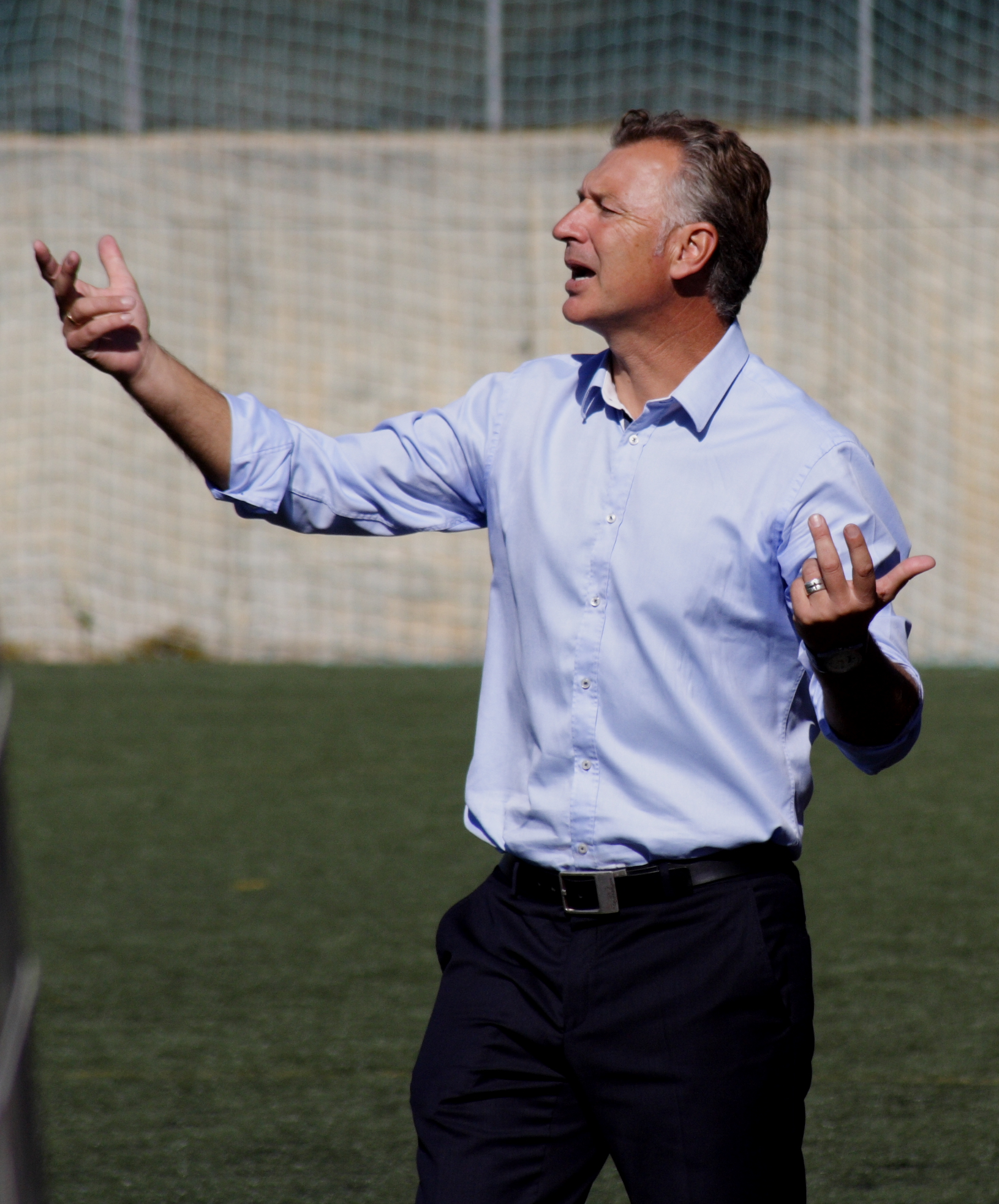
- Rivas coaching Alcorcón B

Personal information
- Full name: Antonio Rivas Martínez
- Date of birth: 13 September 1965 (age 61)
- Place of birth: Alcázar de San Juan, Spain
- Height: 1.83 m (6 ft 0 in)
- Position: Centre-back

Team information
- Current team: Oviedo (youth director)

Youth career
- Gimnástico Alcázar

Senior career*
Years	Team	Apps	(Gls)
1984–1988	Atlético Madrid B	73	(9)
1984–1988	Atlético Madrid	4	(1)
1988–1989	Mallorca	25	(4)
1989–1998	Oviedo	239	(15)
1999–2000	Albacete	46	(1)
2000–2001	Benidorm	19	(0)
Total		406	(30)

Managerial career
- 2003–2006: Oviedo
- 2007–2009: Atlético Madrid (youth)
- 2009–2011: Atlético Madrid B
- 2011: Fuenlabrada
- 2013–2014: Alcorcón B
- 2017–2021: Atlético Madrid (youth)
- 2021: Atlético Madrid B
- * Club domestic league appearances and goals

Antonio Rivas Martínez (born 13 September 1965) is a Spanish former footballer who played as a central defender, and a manager. He is the current youth football director of Real Oviedo.

== Playing career ==
Rivas was born in Alcázar de San Juan, Province of Ciudad Real. After an unsuccessful four-year stint with Atlético Madrid, only appearing in four games with the first team, he signed for RCD Mallorca in summer 1988, being regularly used in his only season as the Balearic Islands club returned to La Liga after one year out.

Subsequently, Rivas joined Real Oviedo, going on to play nine consecutive campaigns in the top flight and rarely missing a match when healthy, while being deployed in several defensive positions. In 1990–91, he contributed 36 appearances to help the Asturias side qualify for the UEFA Cup. In 1994–95, he scored a career-high five goals for another comfortable midtable finish (ninth).

After 274 competitive games with Oviedo, the 33-year-old Rivas left the club in the 1999 January transfer window, representing Albacete Balompié over one and a half Segunda División seasons. He closed out his career in the Segunda División B, after one year with Benidorm CF.

== Coaching career ==
Rivas started coaching in 2002–03, being one of four managers as Oviedo were relegated to the third division – eventually to Tercera División due to irregularities. Two years later, he led them to promotion to that level.

In 2007, Rivas returned to his first professional team Atlético Madrid to take charge of the youth system. After two years, he was appointed at their reserves in division three, leading them to the seventh position in his debut campaign. He continued to work in lower-league and amateur football the following seasons, with CF Fuenlabrada and AD Alcorcón B.

Rivas rejoined Atlético's youths in 2017, winning the national championship of that category in his fourth season. He was appointed again at the B team on 6 April 2021, not being able to avoid relegation from the third tier.

On 22 June 2021, Rivas was named academy director at Oviedo.

== Personal life ==
Rivas is the father of the twins Mario and Óscar, both footballers. The former is a forward and the latter is also a central defender.
