= Nevogilde (Lousada) =

- Civil parish
- Location in Portugal
- Coordinates: 41.271°N 8.324°W
- Country: Portugal
- Region: Norte
- Intermunic. comm.: Tâmega e Sousa
- District: Porto
- Municipality: Lousada

Area
  - Total: 3.44 km^{2} (1.33 sq mi)

Population (2011)
  - Total: 2,617
  - Density: 760/km^{2} (2,000/sq mi)
- Time zone: UTC+00:00 (WET)
  - Summer (DST): UTC+01:00 (WEST)

Nevogilde is a civil parish in the municipality of Lousada, Portugal. The population in 2011 was 2,617, in an area of 3.44 km².
