= Tiago Moreira =

Portuguese footballer (born 1988)

Personal information
- Full name: Tiago André Lopes Moreira
- Date of birth: 27 April 1988 (age 38)
- Place of birth: Felgueiras, Portugal
- Height: 1.79 m (5 ft 10 1/2 in)
- Position: Right-back

Team information
- Current team: Ponte

Youth career
- 1996–2000: Varziela
- 2000–2007: Porto
- 2003–2004: → Padroense (loan)

Senior career*
Years	Team	Apps	(Gls)
2007–2009	Infesta	49	(1)
2009–2010	Esmoriz	25	(0)
2010–2011	Ribeirão	30	(0)
2011–2012	Lousada	7	(0)
2012–2014	Oliveirense	63	(1)
2014–2016	Covilhã	85	(1)
2016–2018	União Madeira	66	(2)
2018	Leixões	1	(0)
2019–2024	Covilhã	120	(2)
2024–2025	Lixa	30	(0)
2025–	Ponte	26	(1)
- * Club domestic league appearances and goals as of 13:46, 13 April 2026 (UTC)

Tiago André Lopes Moreira (born 27 April 1988) is a Portuguese professional footballer who plays as a right-back for CD Ponte.

== Club career ==
Born in Felgueiras, Porto District, Moreira spent most of his youth career in the ranks of FC Porto but played only lower-level senior football until May 2014, when he and AD Oliveirense teammate Zé Tiago signed for S.C. Covilhã. He appeared regularly over two Segunda Liga seasons at the club and scored in a 3–1 away win against Sporting CP B on 31 January 2016.

On 31 May 2016, Moreira moved across the league to newly relegated C.F. União, on a one-year contract with the option of a second. When this ended, he joined fellow second-tier team Leixões S.C. on a three-year deal in May 2018, reuniting with his former Covilhã manager Francisco Chaló. He was used almost exclusively in cup games, making only one league appearance and returning to the Estádio Municipal José dos Santos Pinto on 28 December.
