= Pedreiras =

Pedreiras may refer to the following places:

- Pedreiras, Maranhão, in Brazil
- Pedreiras (Porto de Mós), a parish in the municipality of Porto de Mós, in Portugal

== See also ==
- Pedreira (disambiguation)
