= Figueiras e Covas =

- Civil parish
- Location in Portugal
- Coordinates: 41.282°N 8.320°W
- Country: Portugal
- Region: Norte
- Intermunic. comm.: Tâmega e Sousa
- District: Porto
- Municipality: Lousada

Area
  - Total: 4.34 km^{2} (1.68 sq mi)

Population (2011)
  - Total: 2,107
  - Density: 485/km^{2} (1,260/sq mi)
- Time zone: UTC+00:00 (WET)
  - Summer (DST): UTC+01:00 (WEST)

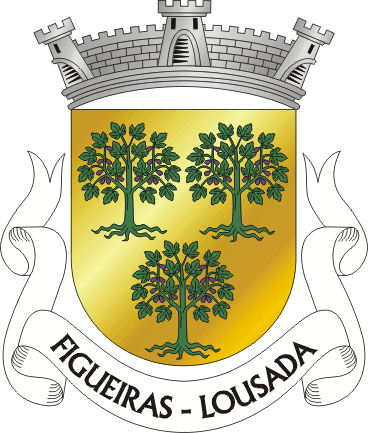
Coat of arms- Figueiras e Covas

Figueiras e Covas is a civil parish in the municipality of Lousada, Portugal. It was formed in 2012 by the merger of the former parishes Figueiras and Covas. The population in 2011 was 2,108, in an area of 4.34 km².
