= Óscar Rivas (footballer) =

Spanish footballer (born 2000)

Personal information
- Full name: Óscar Rivas Viondi
- Date of birth: 27 March 2000 (age 26)
- Place of birth: Albacete, Spain
- Height: 1.90 m (6 ft 3 in)
- Position: Centre back

Team information
- Current team: Vitória de Guimarães
- Number: 4

Youth career
- 2009–2018: Atlético Madrid
- 2018–2019: Getafe

Senior career*
Years	Team	Apps	(Gls)
2019–2021	Móstoles	24	(2)
2021	Alcorcón B	12	(0)
2021–2024	Alcorcón	62	(3)
2024–	Vitória de Guimarães	28	(2)
- * Club domestic league appearances and goals as of 25 May 2026

Óscar Rivas Viondi (born 27 March 2000) is a Spanish footballer who plays as a central defender for Portuguese club Vitória de Guimarães.

== Club career ==
Born in Albacete, Castilla–La Mancha, Rivas was a Getafe CF youth graduate, after starting out at Atlético Madrid. On 17 July 2019, after finishing his formation, he signed for Tercera División side CD Móstoles URJC.

Rivas made his senior debut on 25 August 2019, starting in a 2–3 home loss against AD Torrejón CF. He scored his first goal on 3 November, netting his team's third in a 4–0 home routing of CD Paracuellos Antamira.

In July 2021, Rivas moved to AD Alcorcón and was assigned to the reserves in the Tercera División RFEF. He made his first-team debut on 15 December, starting in a 1–2 extra time away loss against Sporting de Gijón in the season's Copa del Rey.

Rivas scored his first professional goal on 27 March 2022, netting his team's only in a 1–2 home loss against Real Valladolid. On 21 April, he renewed his contract until 2024, with an option for another two years.

On 2 July 2024, Rivas signed a four-year contract with Vitória de Guimarães in Portugal. On 7 November 2024, Rivas scored the second goal in a 2-1 victory over FK Mladá Boleslav in a UEFA Conference League league stage game.

== Honours ==
Vitória SC

- Taça da Liga: 2025–26

== Personal life ==
Rivas' twin brother Mario is also a footballer; a forward, he was also part of the youth setup at Getafe. Their father Antonio was also a footballer.
