= Pedreira, Rande e Sernande =

- Civil parish
- Location in Portugal
- Coordinates: 41.332°N 8.220°W
- Country: Portugal
- Region: Norte
- Intermunic. comm.: Tâmega e Sousa
- District: Porto
- Municipality: Felgueiras

Area
  - Total: 6.98 km^{2} (2.69 sq mi)

Population (2011)
  - Total: 3,487
  - Density: 500/km^{2} (1,290/sq mi)
- Time zone: UTC+00:00 (WET)
  - Summer (DST): UTC+01:00 (WEST)

Pedreira, Rande e Sernande is a civil parish in the municipality of Felgueiras, Portugal. It was formed in 2013 by the merger of the former parishes of Pedreira, Rande and Sernande. The population in 2011 was 3,487, in an area of 6.98 km^{2}.
