= Nuno Namora =

Portuguese footballer

Personal information
- Full name: Nuno Frederico de Melo Machado Cerejeira Namora
- Date of birth: 12 February 1998 (age 28)
- Place of birth: Porto, Portugal
- Height: 1.78 m (5 ft 10 in)
- Position: Left-back

Team information
- Current team: Felgueiras

Youth career
- 2007–2010: Porto
- 2010–2013: Boavista
- 2013–2017: Rio Ave
- 2017–2018: Braga

Senior career*
Years	Team	Apps	(Gls)
2018	Braga B	0	(0)
2018	→ Gondomar (loan)	1	(0)
2018–2021	Rio Ave B	27	(3)
2021–2024	Rio Ave	4	(0)
2022	→ Leiria (loan)	14	(0)
2022–2023	→ Felgueiras (loan)	21	(1)
2024–2026	Oliveirense	70	(1)
2026–	Felgueiras	0	(0)
- * Club domestic league appearances and goals as of 20 June 2026

Nuno Frederico de Melo Machado Cerejeira Namora (born 12 February 1998) is a Portuguese professional footballer who plays as a left-back for Liga Portugal 2 club Felgueiras.

== Professional career ==
Namora is a youth product of Porto, Boavista, and Rio Ave before transferring to Braga on 26 July 2017 with his identical twin brother. On 31 January 2018, he joined Gondomar on loan for the rest for the second half of 2017–18 season.

Namora returned to Rio Ave in 2018, where he was initially assigned to their reserve and youth teams. On 31 July 2021, he was promoted to their senior team and extended his contract until 2024. He made his senior and professional debut with Rio Ave in a 1–0 Taça da Liga win over Arouca on 1 August 2021. in January 2022, he went on a half-season loan to Leiria. The following season, on 14 July 2022, he joined Felgueiras on a season-long loan.

He returned to Rio Ave in preparation for the 2023–24 season in the Primeira Liga on 1 July 2023.

On 31 January 2024, Namora terminated his contract with Rio Ave and joined Liga Portugal 2 club Oliveirense.

== Personal life ==
Namora is the identical twin brother of the footballer Manuel Namora.
