= Landinho =

Portuguese footballer

Personal information
- Full name: Rolando António Pereira Rocha Almeida
- Date of birth: 13 January 1993 (age 33)
- Place of birth: Amarante, Portugal
- Height: 1.80 m (5 ft 11 in)
- Position: Midfielder

Team information
- Current team: Felgueiras
- Number: 8

Youth career
- 2002–2003: Amarante
- 2003–2004: Boavista
- 2004–2005: ACD Madalena
- 2005–2006: Boavista
- 2006–2007: Pasteleira
- 2007–2008: Académico Amarante
- 2008–2009: Penafiel
- 2009–2012: Amarante

Senior career*
Years	Team	Apps	(Gls)
2012–2013	Amarante	28	(1)
2013–2015	Portimonense	1	(0)
2014	→ Felgueiras (loan)	13	(1)
2014–2015	→ Amarante (loan)	5	(0)
2015–2017	Fafe	65	(3)
2017	Bragança	11	(1)
2017–2019	Fafe	49	(7)
2019–2020	Vizela	20	(2)
2020–2021	Amora	18	(1)
2021–2022	Fafe	27	(4)
2022–	Felgueiras	99	(5)
- * Club domestic league appearances and goals as of 20 June 2026

Rolando António Pereira Rocha Almeida (born 13 January 1993), known as Landinho, is a Portuguese professional footballer who plays as a midfielder for Liga Portugal 2 club Felgueiras.

== Career ==
On 6 October 2013, Landinho made his professional debut with Portimonense in a 2013–14 Segunda Liga match against Santa Clara replacing Hugo Gomes (63rd minute).
