= Lousada =

- Municipality
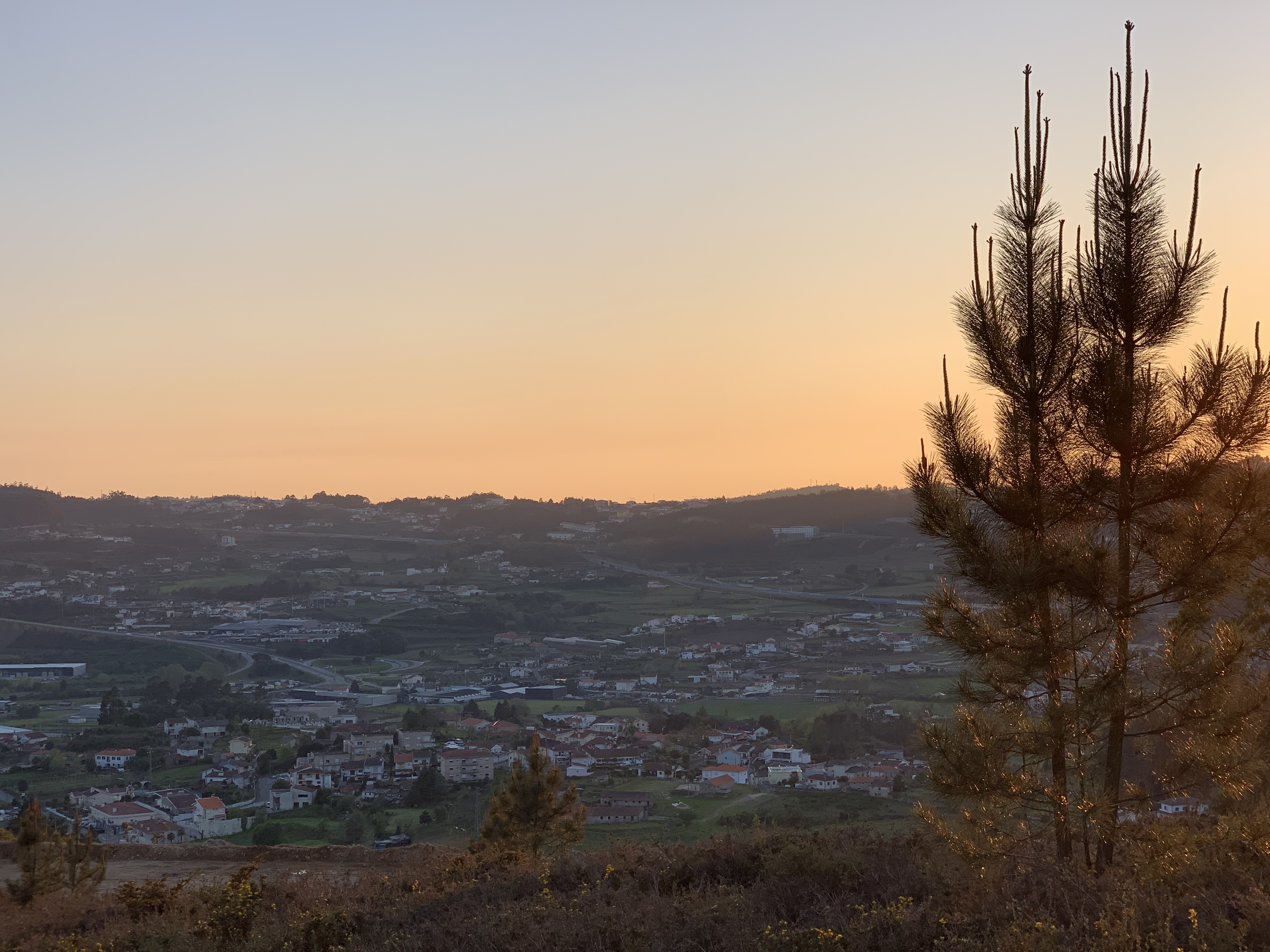
- Partial view of Lousada

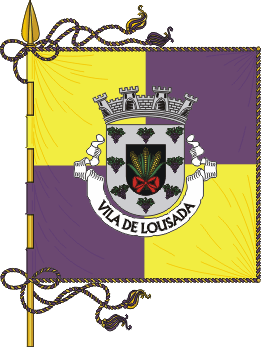
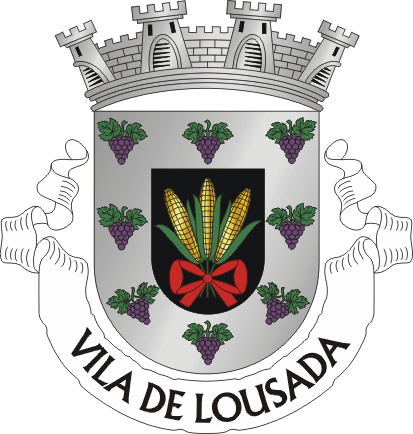
- Flag Coat of arms
- Interactive map of Lousada
- Location in Portugal
- Coordinates: 41.30°N 8.24°W
- Country: Portugal
- Region: Norte
- Intermunic. comm.: Tâmega e Sousa
- District: Porto
- Parishes: 15

Government
  - President: Jorge Magalhães (PS)

Area
  - Total: 96.08 km^{2} (37.10 sq mi)

Population (2011)
  - Total: 47,387
  - Density: 493.2/km^{2} (1,277/sq mi)
- Time zone: UTC+00:00 (WET)
  - Summer (DST): UTC+01:00 (WEST)
- Website: www.cm-lousada.pt

Lousada (European Portuguese pronunciation: [loˈzaðɐ]) is a town and municipality of the Porto district, in northern Portugal. The population in 2011 was 47,387, in an area of 96.08 km^{2} (37.10 sq mi).

It includes the site of Ancient Magnetum (Portuguese Magneto), in the civil parish Meinedo, which briefly was a short-lived Suebi-Galician bishopric and is now a Latin Catholic titular see.

The town in named after the Luso-Galician Lozada family.

== Ecclesiastical history ==
In 569, as Diocese of Magnetum (Latin) / Magneto (Curiate Italiano and Portuguese) / Magneten(sis) (Latin adjective) was established on territory of the Kingdom of the Suebi in Galicia, split off from the Archdiocese of Braga, its apparent Metropolitan.

In 585, when the kingdom was annexed by the Visigoths, and was turned into the sixth province of the Visigothic Kingdom of Hispania, the bishopric was suppressed, its territory being reassigned to establish the Diocese of Portucale (present see of Porto).

Its only recorded residential bishop was :

- Viator (572–585).

=== Titular see ===
The diocese was nominally restored in 1969 as Latin Catholic Titular bishopric of Magnetum (Latin) / Magneto (Curiate Italian) / Magneten(sis) (Latin adjective).

It has had the following incumbents, of the fitting Episcopal (lowest) rank with an archiepiscopal (current) exception :

- Angelo Frosi, Xaverian Missionary Fathers (S.X.) (1970.02.02 – 1978.05.26) ?Auxiliary? Bishop of Abaetetuba (Brazil) (1970.02.02 – 1981.09.17), Bishop of Abaetetuba (1981.09.17 – death 1995.06.28)
- Armido Gasparini, Comboni Missionaries of the Heart of Jesus (M.C.C.J.) (1979.03.15 – death 2004.10.21) as first Apostolic Vicar of Awasa (Ethiopia) (1979.03.15 – 1993.12.20); previously last Apostolic Prefect of Awasa (Ethiopia) (1973.02.16 – 1979.03.15)
- António Francisco dos Santos (2004.12.21 – 2006.09.21) as Auxiliary Bishop of Braga (Portugal) (2004.12.21 – 2006.09.21), later Bishop of Aveiro (Portugal) (2006.09.21 – 2014.02.21), Bishop of Porto (Portugal) (2014.02.21 – ...)
- Titular Archbishop Léon Kalenga Badikebele (2008.03.01 – death 2019.06.12), papal diplomat : Apostolic Nuncio (ambassador) to Ghana (2008.03.01 – 2013.02.22), Apostolic Nuncio to El Salvador (2013.02.22 – ...) and Apostolic Nuncio to Belize (2013.04.13 – ...).

== Civil Parishes ==
The municipality of Lousada is subdivided into the following Freguesias 'civil parishes) :

- Aveleda
- Caíde de Rei
- Cernadelo e Lousada (São Miguel e Santa Margarida)
- Cristelos, Boim e Ordem
- Figueiras e Covas
- Lodares
- Lustosa e Barrosas (Santo Estêvão)
- Macieira
- Meinedo
- Nespereira e Casais
- Nevogilde
- Silvares, Pias, Nogueira e Alvarenga
- Sousela
- Torno
- Vilar do Torno e Alentém

== Eurocircuito da Costilha ==
This circuit has been used several times for the European autocross championship and it is traditionally the circuit where the Portuguese round of the FIA European Championship for rallycross drivers takes place.

== Disappearance of Rui Pedro Teixeira Mendonça ==
Rui Pedro Teixeira Mendonça went missing on March 4, 1998 in Lousada, Portugal. Rui Pedro was 11 years old and riding his bicycle outside near his home when he disappeared. His case remains unsolved.

== Notable people ==
- Pedro Moreira (born 1989) is a Portuguese professional footballer with over 280 club caps
- Catarina Ribeiro (born 1990) a Portuguese long distance runner, competed in the woman's marathon at the 2020 Summer Olympics

== See also ==
- List of Catholic dioceses in Portugal

== Sources and external links ==
- GCatholic – Magnetum (titular) see
- Photos from Lousada
