= Mateus Pasinato =

Brazilian footballer

Personal information
- Full name: Mateus Pasinato
- Date of birth: 28 June 1992 (age 34)
- Place of birth: Concórdia, Brazil
- Height: 1.91 m (6 ft 3 in)
- Position: Goalkeeper

Team information
- Current team: Felgueiras
- Number: 41

Youth career
- 2010: Rio Preto
- 2010: Desportivo Brasil

Senior career*
Years	Team	Apps	(Gls)
2011	Desportivo Brasil	2	(0)
2012	Rio Preto	0	(0)
2012	Olímpia	0	(0)
2013	Rio Branco-SP	0	(0)
2013–2020	XV de Piracicaba	29	(0)
2018	→ Bragantino (loan)	0	(0)
2018	→ Vila Nova (loan)	43	(0)
2019	→ São Bento (loan)	1	(0)
2019–2020	→ Moreirense (loan)	33	(0)
2020–2022	Moreirense	49	(0)
2023–2024	América Mineiro	10	(0)
2024–2025	Cuiabá	32	(0)
2026–	Felgueiras	12	(0)
- * Club domestic league appearances and goals as of 20 June 2026

Mateus Pasinato (born 28 June 1992) is a Brazilian professional footballer who plays as a goalkeeper for Liga Portugal 2 club Felgueiras.

== Career ==
On 10 January 2024, Pasinato left América Mineiro and signed a two-year contract with fellow Série A club Cuiabá.

On 19 January 2026, Pasinato returned to Portugal, joining Liga Portugal 2 club Felgueiras.

== Career statistics ==
As of 1 March 2023

Appearances and goals by club, season and competition
Club	Season	League			State league (Note: Includes Campeonato Paulista Segunda Divisão, Campeonato Paulista, Campeonato Paulista Série A2, Campeonato Goiano and Campeonato Mineiro.)		National cup (Note: Includes Copa do Brasil and Taça de Portugal.)		League cup (Note: Includes Taça da Liga.)		Continental (Note: Includes Copa Libertadores.)		Other (Note: Includes Copa Paulista and Primeira Liga relegation play-offs.)		Total	
Club	Season	Division	Apps	Goals	Apps	Goals	Apps	Goals	Apps	Goals	Apps	Goals	Apps	Goals	Apps	Goals
Desportivo Brasil	2011	Paulista 2ª Divisão	—		2	0	—		—		—		—		2	0
Rio Preto	2012	Paulista A2	—		0	0	—		—		—		—		0	0
Olímpia	2012	Paulista 2ª Divisão	—		0	0	—		—		—		—		0	0
Rio Branco-SP	2013	Paulista A2	—		0	0	—		—		—		—		0	0
XV de Piracicaba	2013	Paulista	—		0	0	—		—		—		1	0	1	0
XV de Piracicaba	2014	Paulista	—		7	0	—		—		—		20	0	27	0
XV de Piracicaba	2015	Paulista	—		0	0	—		—		—		6	0	6	0
XV de Piracicaba	2016	Paulista	—		0	0	—		—		—		23	0	23	0
XV de Piracicaba	2017	Série D	6	0	16	0	—		—		—		19	0	41	0
XV de Piracicaba	Total		6	0	23	0	—		—		—		69	0	98	0
Bragantino	2018	Série C	0	0	0	0	0	0	—		—		—		0	0
Vila Nova	2018	Série B	29	0	14	0	4	0	—		—		—		47	0
São Bento	2019	Série B	1	0	0	0	—		—		—		—		1	0
Moreirense	2019–20	Primeira Liga	33	0	—		0	0	1	0	—		—		34	0
Moreirense	2020–21	Primeira Liga	30	0	—		3	0	0	0	—		—		33	0
Moreirense	2021–22	Primeira Liga	19	0	—		2	0	0	0	—		0	0	21	0
Moreirense	2022–23	Liga Portugal 2	0	0	—		2	0	4	0	—		—		6	0
Moreirense	Total		82	0	—		7	0	5	0	—		0	0	94	0
América Mineiro	2023	Série A	0	0	0	0	0	0	—		0	0	—		0	0
Career total			118	0	39	0	11	0	5	0	0	0	69	0	94	0

== Honours ==
XV de Piracicaba

- Copa Paulista: 2016
