= Pedreira (surname) =

Pedreira is a surname. Notable people with the surname include:

- Antonio S. Pedreira (1899–1939), Puerto Rican writer and educator
- Emiliano Pedreira (born 1985), Argentine footballer
- Frederico Pedreira (born 1983), Portuguese writer
- José Enrique Pedreira (1904–1959), Puerto Rican composer
- Martín Pedreira (born 1952), Cuban guitarist, composer and professor
