= Avenida 25 de Abril (Póvoa de Varzim) =

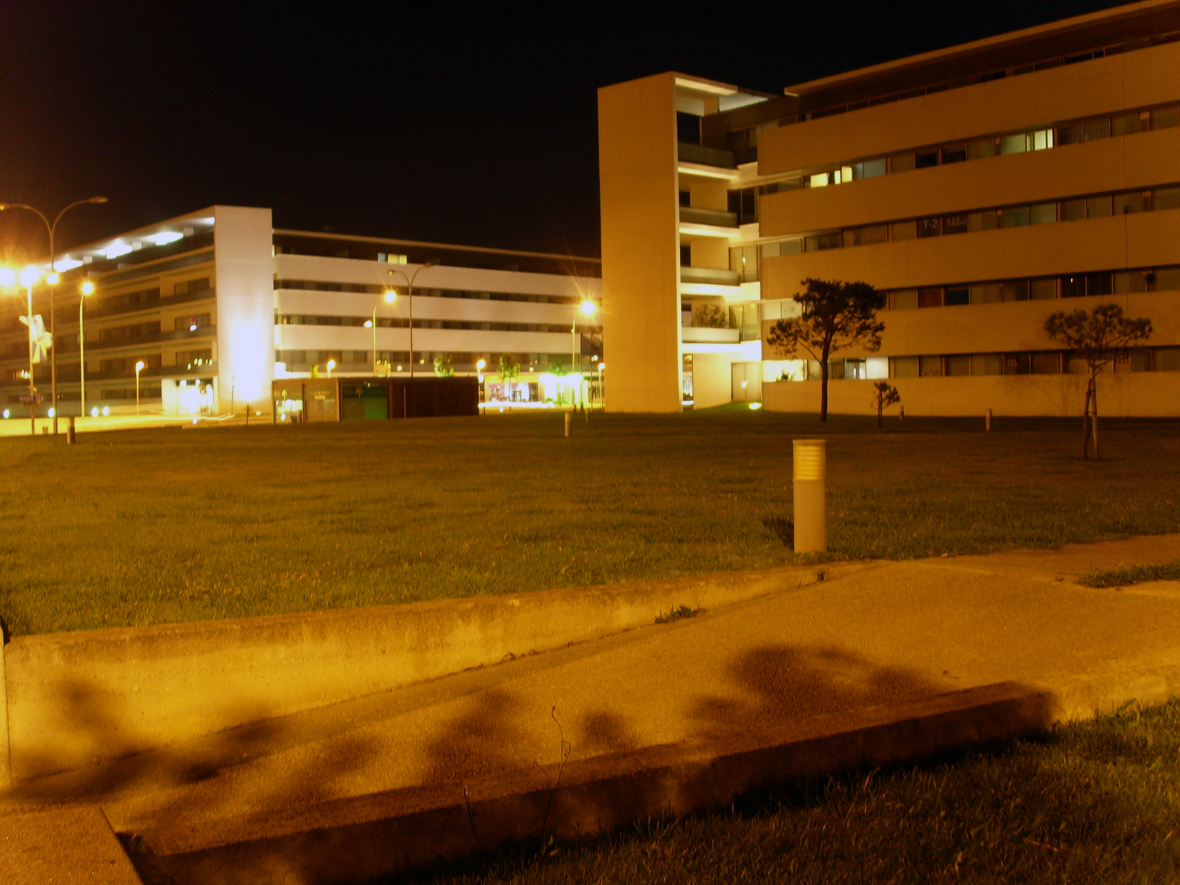
Jean Pierre Porcher's contemporary buildings, the doors of the avenue, were selected for the showcase "Habitar Portugal 2003/2005", by the Order of Architects/MAPEI.

Avenida 25 de Abril is an avenue that surrounds, by the east, the city of Póvoa de Varzim, in Portugal. It stretches from Avenida do Mar to the city limits with Vila do Conde. The avenue has almost 3 km long and is considered structural to the urbanization of inland Póvoa. The avenue is known for its large number of roundabouts and serpent-shape, the City Hall justified this option due to speeds limits not being respected, a known problem on national highway 13 that crosses the city center, and in order not to implement traffic lights.

The idea for the avenue occurred in 1982 to architect Carvalho Dias and started being urbanized in early 2000s, prior to the urbanization the Industrial Area of Barreiros and a couple of houses existed there. The first smaller section was rapidly urbanized and became one of the most central areas in the city. In 2007, the remaining avenue opened, a new central garden and a monument to the parishes of Póvoa de Varzim, by sculptor Fernando Gonçalves da Silva, was inaugurated. But the urbanization of this new area failed and led the city hall to change the urbanization plan in order to motivate promoters. A northern expansion, throw the city park, is also planned.
