= Lagoa da Pedreira =

Lake in Portugal

Lagoa da Pedreira Lake Pedreira
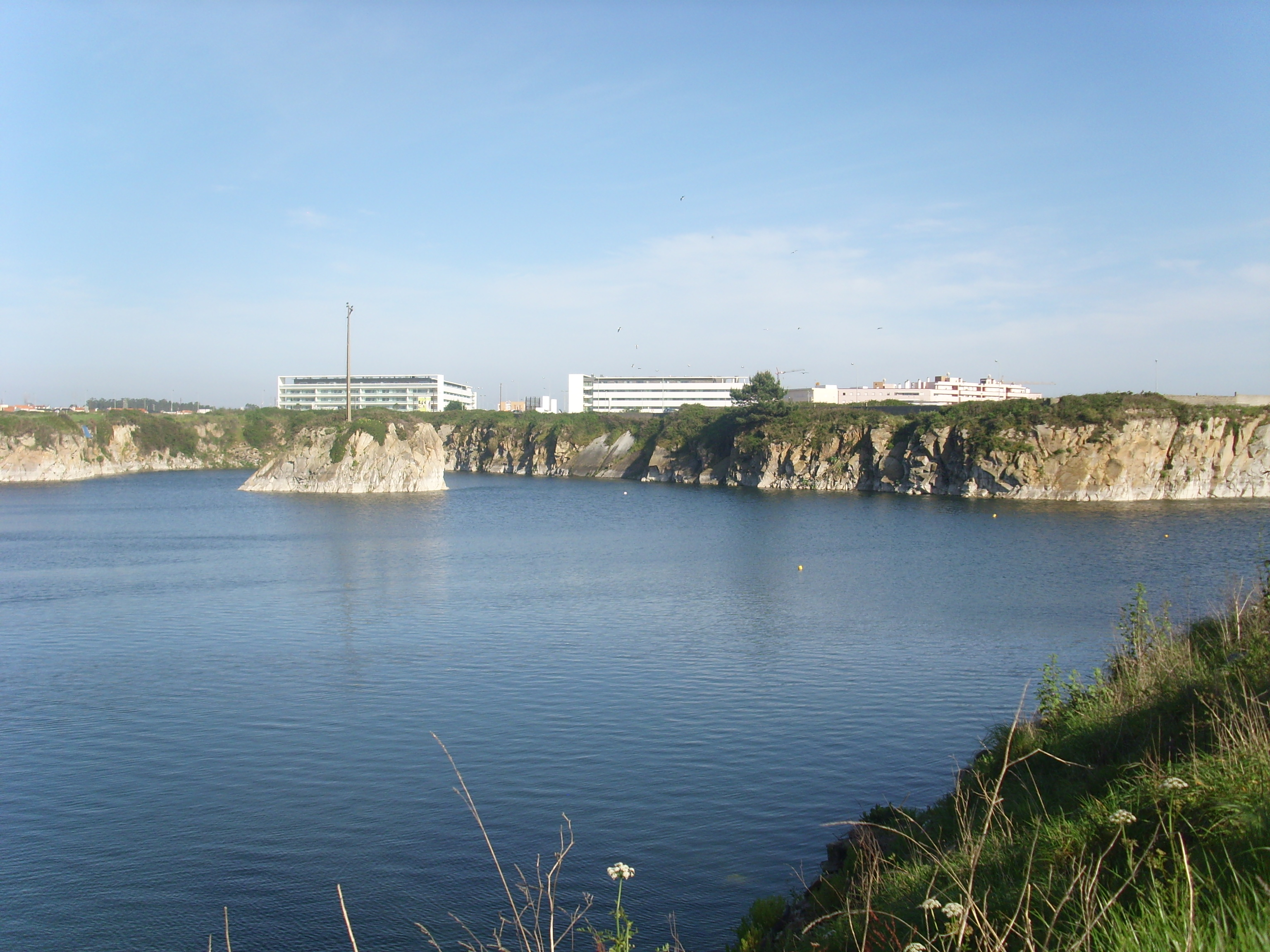
- Cliffs of Lake Pedreira

- Location within Portugal Location within Spain
- Location: Póvoa de Varzim, Portugal
- Coordinates: 41°23′40″N 08°45′40″W
- Type: Flooded quarry
- Primary inflows: Rio do Esteiro
- Primary outflows: Rio do Esteiro
- Max. length: 306 m (1,004 ft)
- Max. width: 235 m (771 ft)
- Islands: 1
- Settlements: Póvoa de Varzim

Lagoa da Pedreira (English: Quarry Lake), also known simply as Pedreira or Lagoa da Póvoa de Varzim is a small lake in the city of Póvoa de Varzim, Portugal.

== Geography ==
Pedreira is a small lake that exists since late 20th century as an unavoidable casualty, despite being the work of man. The site was a quarry used to extract granite to the build the breakwaters of the port of Póvoa de Varzim in the 1930s. "Lagoa", in Portuguese, is used to refer to small freshwater lakes and saltwater lagoons.

With the exaction of the stone, an aquifer was reached and groundwater kept entering the quarry. When the quarry was eventually shutdown in late 20th century, the water was left free to fill the quarry's basin. Due to the 2004/2005 drought, use of its water for irrigation, and to fill the landscaped lake of Póvoa de Varzim City Park, the water level declined sharply.

Pedreira is L-shaped and all of the lake is surrounded by granitic cliffs, excepting by the west and in the southeastern tip. It has a small islet located near the cliffs.

== Fauna ==
In common with its creation, the aquatic fauna which lives in the lake, is the work of man and casualty, such as aquarium dumping. The lake's first aquatic inhabitants were native amphibians, but currently freshwater fish, red swamp crawfish and turtles thrive in the lake. It is also used as a stop by native migratory birds.

== City park plan ==
Póvoa de Varzim City Hall plans to use the lake for the west expansion area of the City Park of Póvoa de Varzim. The project was delivered to the Technical University of Lisbon, in a project led by Sidónio Pardal, the most notable landscape architect in Portugal. The plan includes its use for recreational boating, basin cleaning and cliff excavation in a staircase-shape, which according to the city hall, it will reduce hazards.
