= Mario Rivas (footballer, born 2000) =

Spanish footballer (born 2000)

Personal information
- Full name: Mario Rivas Viondi
- Date of birth: 27 March 2000 (age 26)
- Place of birth: Albacete, Spain
- Height: 1.91 m (6 ft 3 in)
- Position: Forward

Team information
- Current team: Felgueiras
- Number: 7

Youth career
- 2009–2016: Atlético Madrid
- 2016–2019: Getafe

Senior career*
Years	Team	Apps	(Gls)
2019–2021	Móstoles	23	(1)
2021–2022	Leganés B	43	(9)
2021	Leganés	1	(0)
2022–2023	Alcorcón B	15	(5)
2022	Alcorcón	1	(0)
2023	Lleida	15	(1)
2023–2024	Navalcarnero	31	(3)
2024–2025	Real Ávila	31	(12)
2025–	Felgueiras	33	(10)
- * Club domestic league appearances and goals as of 20 June 2026

Mario Rivas Viondi (born 27 March 2000) is a Spanish footballer who plays as a forward for Liga Portugal 2 club Felgueiras.

== Club career ==
Born in Albacete, Castilla–La Mancha, Rivas was a Getafe CF youth graduate, after starting it out at Atlético Madrid. On 16 July 2019, after finishing his formation, he signed for Tercera División side CD Móstoles URJC.

Rivas made his senior debut on 1 September 2019, playing the last 26 minutes in a 2–1 away win over CF Pozuelo de Alarcón. He scored his first senior goal on 29 November 2020, netting a last-minute equalizer in a 1–1 away draw against CD Leganés B.

On 2 January 2021, Rivas moved to CD Leganés and was assigned to the B-team, also in the fourth division. He made his first team debut on 29 October, coming on as a late substitute for Javier Eraso in a 0–1 loss at UD Almería in the Segunda División.

== Personal life ==
Rivas' twin brother Óscar is also a footballer; a defender, he was also part of the youth setup at Getafe. Their father Antonio was also a footballer.
