= Diogo Batista (footballer, born 2000) =

Portuguese footballer (born 2000)

Personal information
- Full name: Diogo José Branco Batista
- Date of birth: 21 April 2000 (age 26)
- Place of birth: Barreiro, Portugal
- Height: 1.84 m (6 ft 0 in)
- Position: Midfielder

Team information
- Current team: Felgueiras
- Number: 21

Youth career
- 2008–2009: Barreirense
- 2009–2010: Fabril Barreiro
- 2010–2015: Sporting CP
- 2014–2015: → Vitória Setúbal (loan)
- 2015–2016: Benfica
- 2016–2017: Vitória Setúbal
- 2017–2019: Aves

Senior career*
Years	Team	Apps	(Gls)
2018–2020	Aves U23	41	(2)
2020–2022	Estoril U23	44	(4)
2022–2025	Penafiel	81	(4)
2025–2026	Hermannstadt	6	(0)
2026–	Felgueiras	0	(0)
- * Club domestic league appearances and goals as of 12 September 2026

Diogo José Branco Batista (born 21 April 2000) is a Portuguese professional footballer who plays as a midfielder for Liga Portugal 2 club Felgueiras.
