= Covas (surname) =

Covas is a surname. Notable people with the surname include:

- Bruno Covas (1980–2021), Brazilian lawyer, economist, and politician
- Mário Covas (1930–2001), Brazilian politician
