= Idães =

- Civil parish
- Location in Portugal
- Coordinates: 41.33°N 8.26°W
- Country: Portugal
- Region: Norte
- Intermunic. comm.: Tâmega e Sousa
- District: Porto
- Municipality: Felgueiras

Area
  - Total: 7.11 km^{2} (2.75 sq mi)

Population (2011)
  - Total: 2,496
  - Density: 351/km^{2} (909/sq mi)
- Time zone: UTC+00:00 (WET)
  - Summer (DST): UTC+01:00 (WEST)

Idães is a civil parish in the municipality of Felgueiras, Portugal. The population in 2011 was 2,496, in an area of 7.11 km^{2} (2.75 sq mi). The parish contains the town Barrosas.
