= F.C. Felgueiras (2006) =

Portuguese association football club

Felgueiras
- Full name: Futebol Clube de Felgueiras
- Nickname: Felgueirenses
- Founded: 2006; 20 years ago
- Ground: Estádio Dr. Machado de Matos
- Capacity: 7,540
- Chairman: Leonel Costa
- Manager: Moreno
- League: Liga Portugal 2
- 2025–26: Liga Portugal 2, 11th of 18
- Website: fcfsad.pt
| Home colours | Away colours |

Futebol Clube de Felgueiras (formerly Futebol Club de Felgueiras 1932) is an association football club based in Felgueiras, Porto District, Portugal founded in 2006 after the original F.C. Felgueiras ended in 2005 due to financial problems. They got promoted to play in the Liga 3 in the 2021-22 season and hold their games at the Estádio Dr. Machado de Matos.

== Recent seasons ==
| Season | Division | Place | Taça de Portugal |
|---|---|---|---|
| 2007/08 | AF Porto First Division | 7th | – |
| 2008/09 | AF Porto First Division | 3rd | – |
| 2009/10 | AF Porto First Division | 3rd | – |
| 2010/11 | AF Porto Division of Honour | 9th | – |
| 2011/12 | AF Porto Division of Honour | 1st | – |
| 2012/13 | Terceira Divisão | 2nd | Second round |
| 2013/14 | Campeonato Nacional de Seniores | 3rd | Third round |
| 2014/15 | Campeonato Nacional de Seniores | 4th | Third round |
| 2015/16 | Campeonato Nacional de Seniores | 5th | First round |
| 2016/17 | Campeonato de Portugal | 3rd | First round |
| 2017/18 | Campeonato de Portugal | 1st | Fourth round |
| 2018/19 | Campeonato de Portugal | 5th | Third round |
| 2019/20 | Campeonato de Portugal | 7th | Second round |
| 2020/21 | Campeonato de Portugal | 4th^{†} | Third round |
| 2021/22 | Liga 3 | *ongoing | Third round |

^{†}Qualified to Liga 3 qualification series (Finished 2nd, promoted to Liga 3)

== Current squad ==
As of 22 September 2026

Note: Flags indicate national team as defined under FIFA eligibility rules; some limited exceptions apply. Players may hold more than one non-FIFA nationality.

| No. | Pos. | Nation | Player |
|---|---|---|---|
| 3 | DF | POR | João Pinto |
| 4 | DF | BRA | Dudu Cruz |
| 5 | DF | POR | Afonso Peixoto |
| 6 | MF | POR | Henrique Martins |
| 7 | FW | ESP | Mario Rivas |
| 8 | MF | POR | Landinho |
| 9 | FW | POR | Tiago Leite |
| 10 | MF | BRA | Michel |
| 11 | FW | POR | João Costa (on loan from Santa Clara) |
| 12 | GK | CAN | Izan Server |
| 13 | FW | POR | Joãozinho |
| 14 | GK | BRA | Mateus Pasinato |
| 15 | DF | POR | Armando Lopes |
| 16 | MF | ANG | Beni Jetour |
| 17 | DF | POR | Filipe Cruz |
| 19 | FW | BRA | Lucas Duarte |
| 20 | MF | POR | Rodrigo Ribeiro |

| No. | Pos. | Nation | Player |
|---|---|---|---|
| 21 | MF | POR | Diogo Batista |
| 22 | DF | POR | Samuel Vivas |
| 23 | DF | POR | Afonso Freitas |
| 25 | GK | BRA | Felipe Scheibig |
| 30 | FW | GBS | Jovane Camará (on loan from Guarda) |
| 31 | GK | POR | Eduardo Esteves |
| 33 | DF | BRA | Dário |
| 45 | DF | CIV | Bakary Haidara |
| 47 | FW | BRA | João Bom |
| 70 | DF | MAR | Bilal Ouacharaf |
| 77 | MF | POR | Francisco França |
| 80 | FW | POR | Tiago Ventura |
| 86 | MF | POR | Marco Ribeiro |
| 87 | FW | BRA | Samuel |
| 88 | FW | BRA | Gustavo Mendes |
| — | DF | POR | Nuno Namora |

=== Out on loan ===
Note: Flags indicate national team as defined under FIFA eligibility rules; some limited exceptions apply. Players may hold more than one non-FIFA nationality.

| No. | Pos. | Nation | Player |
|---|---|---|---|
| — | MF | BFA | Faissal Zangré (at Amarante until 30 June 2027) |

== Coaches ==
- (Portugal) António Lima Pereira (2007/08–2010/11)
- (Portugal) Ricardo Soares (2011/12–2012/2013)
- (Portugal) Alex (2013/14)
- (Portugal) Ricardo Soares (2014/15)
- (Portugal) Zamorano (2015/16)^{†}
- (Portugal) Nuno Pinto (2015/16)
- (Portugal) Rui Luís (2016/17)^{†}
- (Portugal) Ricardo Silva (2016/17)
- (Portugal) Horácio Gonçalves (2017/18- 2018/19)^{†}
- (Portugal) Ricardo Sousa (2018/19)
- (Portugal) Luís Pinto (1 July 2019 – 3 February 2020)^{†}
- (Portugal) Nuno Andrade (2019/20)
- (Portugal) Rui Ferreira (2020/21)^{†}
- (Portugal) Pintassilgo (2020/21)
- (Portugal) Bruno China (2021–present)

^{†} Sacked/Replaced before the end of the season

== League and cup history ==
Below are listed the club's performances in the past seasons. Updated as of 5 February 2022

| Season | League | Pos | Pld | W | D | L | GF | GA | Pts | Cup | League Cup | Notes | Source |
|---|---|---|---|---|---|---|---|---|---|---|---|---|---|
| 2012-13 | Terceira Divisão | 2nd* | 22 | 15 | 3 | 4 | 41 | 19 | 48 | Second round | - | *Promoted to CNS | |
| 2013-14 | Campeonato Nacional de Séniores | 3rd | 18 | 8 | 6 | 4 | 28 | 17 | 30 | Third round | - | - | |
| 2014-15 | Campeonato Nacional de Séniores | 4th | 18 | 9 | 6 | 3 | 24 | 19 | 33 | Third round | - | - | |
| 2015-16 | Campeonato Nacional de Séniores | 5th | 18 | 6 | 8 | 4 | 15 | 18 | 26 | First round | - | - | |
| 2016-17 | Campeonato de Portugal | 3rd | 18 | 10 | 5 | 3 | 30 | 12 | 35 | First round | - | - | |
| 2017-18 | Campeonato de Portugal | 1st | 30 | 16 | 8 | 6 | 53 | 28 | 56 | Fourth round | - | - | |
| 2018-19 | Campeonato de Portugal | 5th | 32 | 20 | 4 | 8 | 55 | 33 | 64 | Third round | - | - | FPF.pt |
| 2019-20 | Campeonato de Portugal | 7th | 25 | 12 | 5 | 8 | 51 | 37 | 41 | Second round | - | - | FPF.pt |
| 2020-21 | Campeonato de Portugal | 4th* | 18 | 8 | 7 | 3 | 26 | 17 | 31 | Third round | - | *Promoted to Liga 3 | FPF.pt |
| 2021-22 | Liga 3 | 1st* | 17 | 10 | 2 | 5 | 20 | 14 | 32 | Third round | - | *ongoing | FPF.pt |
