= Felipe Scheibig =

Brazilian footballer (born 2000)

Personal information
- Full name: Felipe Mateus Scheibig
- Date of birth: 8 March 2000 (age 26)
- Place of birth: Três Passos, Brazil
- Height: 1.96 m (6 ft 5 in)
- Position: Goalkeeper

Team information
- Current team: Felgueiras
- Number: 25

Youth career
- 2019–2021: Três Passos
- 2019–2021: → Grêmio (loan)
- 2022: Grêmio

Senior career*
| Years | Team | Apps | (Gls) |
| 2021 | Três Passos | 0 | (0) |
| 2021 | → Grêmio (loan) | 0 | (0) |
| 2022–2024 | Grêmio | 2 | (0) |
| 2024 | → Vila Nova (loan) | 0 | (0) |
| 2025 | Confiança | 18 | (0) |
| 2025– | Felgueiras | 13 | (0) |
- * Club domestic league appearances and goals as of 20 JUne 2026

Felipe Mateus Scheibig (born 8 March 2000), known as Felipe Scheibig, is a Brazilian professional footballer who plays as a goalkeeper for Liga Portugal 2 club Felgueiras.

== Career ==
He started his career with Grêmio.

== Honours ==
Grêmio

- Campeonato Gaúcho: 2022
- Recopa Gaúcha: 2022, 2023
