= Joãozinho (footballer, born 1997) =

Portuguese footballer

Personal information
- Full name: João Pedro Martins Cunha Fernandes
- Date of birth: 5 February 1997 (age 29)
- Place of birth: Guimarães, Portugal
- Height: 1.69 m (5 ft 6 1/2 in)
- Position: Winger

Team information
- Current team: Felgueiras
- Number: 13

Youth career
- 2005–2010: Vitória de Guimarães
- 2010–2011: Os Sandinenses
- 2011–2016: Fafe

Senior career*
Years	Team	Apps	(Gls)
2016–2019	Fafe	67	(9)
2019–2021	Vitória Guimarães B	33	(0)
2021–2022	Montalegre	28	(11)
2022–2024	Varzim	43	(5)
2024–2026	Atlético CP	47	(3)
2026	Varzim	8	(2)
2026–	Felgueiras	2	(0)
- * Club domestic league appearances and goals as of 12 September 2026

João Pedro Martins Cunha Fernandes (born 5 February 1997) known as Joãozinho, is a Portuguese professional footballer who plays as a winger for Liga Portugal 2 club Felgueiras.

== Club career ==
On 21 September 2016, Joãozinho made his professional debut with Fafe in a 2016–17 LigaPro match against Portimonense.
