= João Costa (footballer, born 2000) =

Portuguese footballer

Personal information
- Full name: João Pedro Augusto Mourão Costa
- Date of birth: 7 March 2000 (age 26)
- Place of birth: Lisbon, Portugal
- Height: 1.87 m (6 ft 2 in)
- Position: Forward

Team information
- Current team: Felgueiras (on loan from Santa Clara)
- Number: 11

Youth career
- 2011–2016: Clube Atlético e Cultural
- 2016–2018: Loures
- 2018–2019: Vitória F.C.

Senior career*
Years	Team	Apps	(Gls)
2019–2020	ACD Bocal	22	(9)
2020–2022	Estrela Amadora	2	(0)
2021–2022	→ Loures (loan)	24	(12)
2022–2023	Belenenses	27	(9)
2023–2024	Alverca	32	(22)
2024–	Santa Clara	31	(3)
2026–	→ Felgueiras (loan)	0	(0)
- * Club domestic league appearances and goals as of 12 September 2026

João Pedro Augusto Mourão Costa (born 7 March 2000) is a Portuguese professional footballer who plays as a forward for Liga Portugal 2 club Felgueiras on loan from Santa Clara.

== Club career ==
Costa is a youth product of Clube Atlético e Cultural, Loures, and Vitória F.C. After beginning his senior career in district football with ACD Bocal, he transferred to Estrela Amadora on 8 August 2020. He spent the 2021–22 season on loan with Loures and made the Campeonato de Portugal Team of the Season. On 4 July 2022, he moved to Belenenses in the Liga 3. On 20 July 2023, he rescinded his contract with Belenenses despited helping them achieve promotion to the Liga Portugal 2.

On 22 July 2023, Costa moved to Alverca. He achieved 5 promotions in his first 6 seasons as a senior player. He was named the Liga 3 player of the season for the 2023–24 season with 22 goals and 2 assists in 32 matches, and also finished as the top scorer as they achieved promotion to the Liga Portugal 2. He made his professional debut with Santa Clara as a late substitute in a 4–1 Primeira Liga win over Estoril on 11 August 2024, and scored his side's fourth goal.

== Career statistics ==
As of match played 18 December 2025

Appearances and goals by club, season and competition
Club	Season	League			National cup		League cup		Other		Total	
Club	Season	Division	Apps	Goals	Apps	Goals	Apps	Goals	Apps	Goals	Apps	Goals
ACD Bocal	2019–20	Elite Pro National	22	9	—		—		—		22	9
Estrela Amadora	2020–21	Campeonato de Portugal	2	0	—		—		—		2	0
Loures (loan)	2021–22	Campeonato de Portugal	24	12	2	0	—		—		26	12
Belenenses	2022–23	Liga 3	27	9	2	0	—		—		29	9
Alverca	2023–24	Liga 3	32	22	2	2	0	0	—		34	24
Santa Clara	2024–25	Primeira Liga	24	3	2	0	0	0	—		26	3
Santa Clara	2025–26	Primeira Liga	7	0	3	0	1	0	3 (Note: Appearances in UEFA Conference League)	0	14	0
Santa Clara	Total		31	3	5	0	1	0	3	0	40	3
Career total			136	55	11	2	1	0	3	0	153	57

== Honours ==
Alverca

- Liga 3: 2023–24

Individual

- 2023–24 Liga 3 Top Scorer
- 2023–24 Liga 3 Player of the Season
