= Felgueiras =

- Municipality
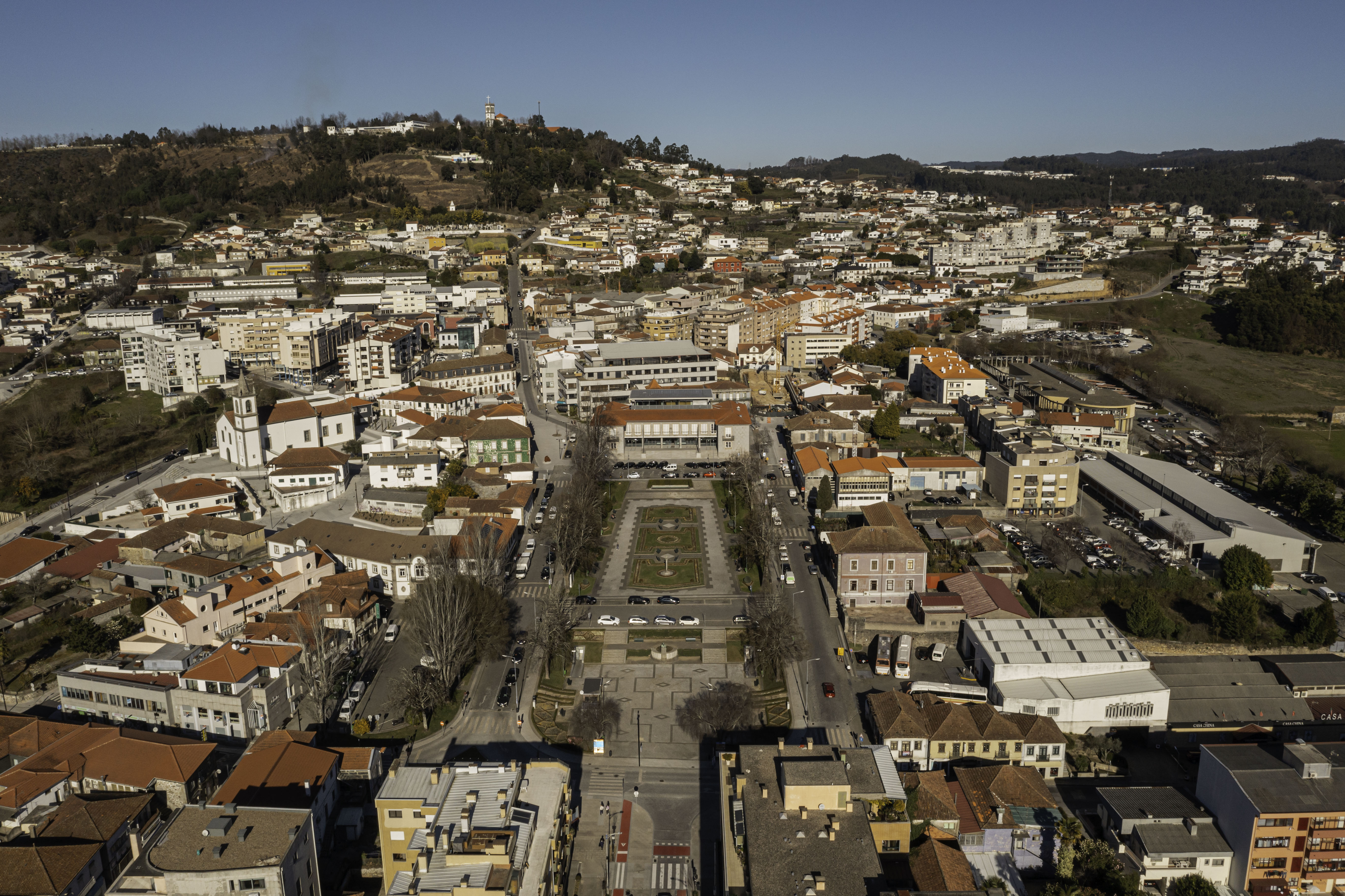
- Partial aerial view of Felgueiras

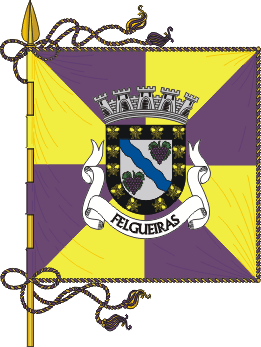
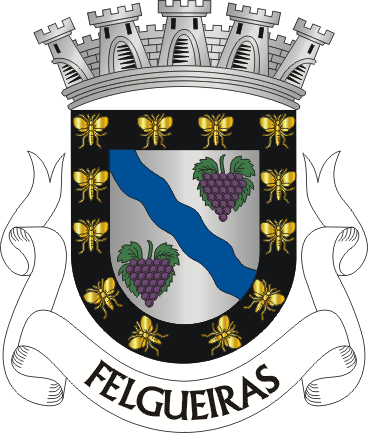
- Flag Coat of arms
- Interactive map of Felgueiras
- Location in Portugal
- Coordinates: 41°22′N 8°12′W
- Country: Portugal
- Region: Norte
- Intermunic. comm.: Tâmega e Sousa
- District: Porto
- Parishes: 20

Government
  - President: Nuno Fonseca (LIVRE-PS)

Area
  - Total: 115.74 km^{2} (44.69 sq mi)

Population (2011)
  - Total: 58,065
  - Density: 501.68/km^{2} (1,299.4/sq mi)
- Time zone: UTC+00:00 (WET)
  - Summer (DST): UTC+01:00 (WEST)

Felgueiras (European Portuguese pronunciation: [fɛlˈɣɐjɾɐʃ]) is a municipality in Porto District, Portugal. The current mayor is Nuno Fonseca. There are two cities located in the municipality: Felgueiras (city status received on 13 July 1990) and Lixa. The population in 2011 was 58,065, in an area of 115.74 km^{2}.

== Parishes ==
Administratively, the municipality is divided into 20 civil parishes (freguesias):

- Aião
- Airães
- Friande
- Idães
- Jugueiros
- Macieira da Lixa e Caramos
- Margaride (Santa Eulália), Várzea, Lagares, Varziela e Moure
- Pedreira, Rande e Sernande
- Penacova
- Pinheiro
- Pombeiro da Ribavizela
- Refontoura
- Regilde
- Revinhade
- Sendim
- Torrados e Sousa
- Unhão e Lordelo
- Vila Cova da Lixa e Borba de Godim
- Vila Fria e Vizela (São Jorge)
- Vila Verde e Santão

== Demographics ==
Population of Felgueiras Municipality (1801–2011)
1801	1849	1900	1930	1960	1981	1991	2001	2011
11 413	15 614	22 973	25 424	38 895	48 015	51 248	57 595	58 065

Industry Felgueiras is one of the biggest producers of Europe in the shoewear area.

== Sports ==
F.C. Felgueiras was a football club from 1936 to 2005. Its successor club is Felgueiras 1932.

The municipality co-hosts the Rally Serras de Fafe e Felgueiras auto race since 2020.

== Notable people ==
- Nicolau Coelho (c. 1460 in Felgueiras – 1502, off the coast of Mozambique) was an expert Portuguese navigator and explorer during the Age of Discovery.

=== Sport ===
- Álvaro Pacheco (born 25 June 1971), a Portuguese football manager and former player with over 360 club caps
- Nélson Manuel Ribeiro da Silva (born 1979), known as Nelsinho, is a Portuguese footballer with over 570 club caps
- Frederico Filipe Teixeira Ribeiro (born 1982), known as Zamorano, a Portuguese retired footballer with 376 club caps
- Daniel Ricardo da Silva Soares (born 1982), known as Dani, a Portuguese footballer with over 425 club caps
- Carlos Pedro Carvalho Sousa (born 1985), known as Pintassilgo, a Portuguese former footballer with 347 club caps
- Tiago Moreira (born 1988), a Portuguese footballer with over 425 club caps
