= Tâmega e Sousa =

- Intermunicipal community
- Logo
- Interactive map of Tâmega e Sousa
- Location in Portugal
- Coordinates: 41.21°N 8.28°W
- Country: Portugal
- Region: Northern Portugal
- Established: 2009
- Seat: Penafiel
- Municipalities: 11

Area
  - Total: 1,831.52 km^{2} (707.15 sq mi)

Population (2011)
  - Total: 432,915
  - Density: 236.369/km^{2} (612.194/sq mi)
- Time zone: UTC+00:00 (WET)
  - Summer (DST): UTC+01:00 (WEST)
- Website: www.cimtamegaesousa.pt

The Comunidade Intermunicipal do Tâmega e Sousa (European Portuguese pronunciation: [ˈtɐmɨɣɐ i ˈsozɐ]) is an administrative division in northern Portugal. It was created in 2009. Since January 2015, Tâmega e Sousa is also a NUTS3 subregion of Norte Region, that covers the same area as the intermunicipal community. The seat of the intermunicipal community is Penafiel. Tâmega e Sousa comprises parts of the former districts of Aveiro, Braga, Porto and Viseu. The population in 2011 was 432,915, in an area of 1,831.52 km².

== Municipalities ==
The intermunicipal community of Tâmega e Sousa consists of 11 municipalities:

Municipality	Population (2011)	Area (km²)
Amarante	56,264	301.33
Baião	20,522	174.53
Castelo de Paiva	16,733	115.01
Celorico de Basto	20,098	181.07
Cinfães	20,427	239.29
Felgueiras	58,065	115.74
Lousada	47,387	96.08
Marco de Canaveses	53,450	201.89
Paços de Ferreira	56,340	70.99
Penafiel	72,265	212.24
Resende	11,364	123.35
Total	432,915	1,831.52
