= 1999–2000 Sporting CP season =

Sporting CP
1999–2000 season
- President: António Dias da Cunha
- Head coach: Giuseppe Materazzi (until September); Augusto Inácio (from September)
- Stadium: Estádio José Alvalade
- Primeira Liga: 1st
- Taça de Portugal: Runners-up
- UEFA Cup: First round
- Top goalscorer: Alberto Acosta (22)
- Highest home attendance: Alberto Acosta (24)

The 1999–2000 season was Sporting Clube de Portugal's 94th season in existence and the club's 66th consecutive season in the top flight of Portuguese football. In addition to the domestic league, Sporting CP will participate in this season's editions of the Taça de Portugal and UEFA Cup. The season covers the period from 1 July 1999 to 30 June 2000.

== Season summary ==
Giuseppe Materazzi was signed as manager, but was sacked after only a few months, following a shock 3–0 defeat to Viking in the UEFA Cup. He was replaced by Augusto Inácio, who was unable to reverse Sporting's fortunes on the continent but still guided them to the title and the domestic cup final.

== First team squad ==
Note: Flags indicate national team as defined under FIFA eligibility rules; some limited exceptions apply. Players may hold more than one non-FIFA nationality.

No.	Pos.	Nation	Player
1	GK	DEN	Peter Schmeichel
2	DF	POR	Quim Berto
3	DF	BRA	Vinícius
4	DF	BRA	Marcos
5	MF	ARG	Aldo Duscher
6	DF	ARG	Facundo Quiroga
7	MF	POR	Delfim
8	MF	POR	Pedro Barbosa (captain)
9	FW	BUL	Ivaylo Yordanov
10	FW	BRA	Edmílson
11	FW	ARG	Alberto Acosta
12	GK	POR	Nuno Santos
14	MF	ESP	Toñito
17	MF	POR	Luís Vidigal
19	FW	GHA	Kwame Ayew

No.	Pos.	Nation	Player
20	DF	MAR	Abdelilah Saber
22	DF	POR	Beto
23	DF	POR	Rui Jorge
25	MF	ITA	Ivone De Franceschi (on loan from Venezia)
26	MF	ESP	Antonio Robaina (on loan from Tenerife)
27	MF	ARG	Mauricio Hanuch
29	DF	BRA	César Prates (on loan from Real Madrid Castilla)
31	MF	CHI	Juan Francisco Viveros
44	DF	POR	Vasco Faísca
48	FW	BEL	Mbo Mpenza
50	DF	BRA	André Cruz
?	GK	POR	Nélson
?	MF	POR	Bino
?	MF	POR	Afonso Martins
?	DF	POR	Marco Caneira

== Transfers ==
=== In ===
- Peter Schmeichel - Manchester United, free
- Mbo Mpenza - Standard Liège, January
- César Prates - Real Madrid B, January, loan

== Competitions ==
=== Overall record ===
Competition	First match	Last match	Starting round	Final position	Record							
Competition	First match	Last match	Starting round	Final position	Pld	W	D	L	GF	GA	GD	Win %
Primeira Liga	22 August 1999	14 May 2000	Matchday 1	Winners	34	23	8	3	57	22	+35	67.65
Taça de Portugal	12 January 2000	25 May 2000	Fifth round	Runners-up	6	4	1	1	9	4	+5	66.67
UEFA Cup	16 September 1999	30 September 1999	First round	First round	2	1	0	1	1	3	−2	50.00
Total					42	28	9	5	67	29	+38	66.67

Source: Competitions

=== Primeira Liga ===
==== League table ====
Pos	Team	Pld	W	D	L	GF	GA	GD	Pts	Qualification or relegation
1	Sporting CP (C)	34	23	8	3	57	22	+35	77	Qualification to Champions League group stage
2	Porto	34	22	7	5	66	26	+40	73	Qualification to Champions League third qualifying round
3	Benfica	34	21	6	7	58	33	+25	69	Qualification to UEFA Cup first round
4	Boavista	34	16	7	11	40	31	+9	55	Qualification to UEFA Cup qualifying round
5	Gil Vicente	34	14	11	9	48	34	+14	53	

Source: Infordesporto
Rules for classification: 1) points; 2) head-to-head points; 3) head-to-head goal difference; 4) goal difference; 5) number of goals scored
(C) Champions

==== Results by round ====
Round	1	2	3	4	5	6	7	8	9	10	11	12	13	14	15	16	17	18	19	20	21	22	23	24	25	26	27	28	29	30	31	32	33	34
Ground	A	H	A	H	A	H	A	H	A	H	A	H	A	H	H	A	H	H	A	H	A	H	A	H	A	H	A	H	A	H	A	A	H	A
Result	D	W	W	D	D	W	L	W	L	W	W	W	W	W	W	D	W	W	W	W	D	D	W	D	W	W	W	W	D	W	W	W	L	W
Position	6	6	4	4	4	2	4	3	5	4	3	3	3	3	2	2	2	2	2	2	2	2	2	2	2	1	1	1	1	1	1	1	1	1

Source: FootballPortugal
A = Away; H = Home; W = Win; D = Draw; L = Loss

=== Taça de Portugal ===
14 November 1999 Fifth Rd	CF Canelas	0–1	Sporting CP
			Berto 54'

12 January 2000 Fifth Rd	Sporting CP	1–0	União de Leiria	Lisbon
	Prates 45'			Stadium: Estádio José Alvalade; Referee: Paulo Baptista

26 January 2000 Sixth Rd	Benfica	1–3	Sporting CP	Lisbon
15:00	Uribe 33'		Acosta 11', 74' (pen.); Cruz 36'	Stadium: Estádio da Luz; Referee: Vítor Pereira

9 February 2000 Quarter-finals	Sporting CP	3–0	Dragões Sandinenses	Lisbon
	Toñito 77'; Marcos 83'; A. Martins 89'			Stadium: Estádio José Alvalade; Referee: Olegário Benquerença

12 April 2000 Semi-finals	Moreirense	0–1	Sporting CP	Moreira de Cónegos
			Ayew 54'	Stadium: Parque de Jogos Comendador Joaquim de Almeida Freitas

21 May 2000 Final	Porto	1–1 (a.e.t.)	Sporting CP	Oeiras
17:00 WEST	Jardel 4'		Barbosa 56'	Stadium: Estádio Nacional; Referee: António Costa (Porto)

25 May 2000 Final replay	Porto	2–0	Sporting CP	Oeiras
20:30 WEST	Clayton 47'; Deco 74'			Stadium: Estádio Nacional; Referee: Lucílio Batista (Lisbon)

=== UEFA Cup ===
==== First round ====
16 September 1999 First leg	Viking (Norway)	3–0	(Portugal) Sporting CP	Stavanger, Norway
20:00	Svensson 57'; Berre 69'; Espevoll 77' (pen.)			Stadium: Stavanger Stadion; Attendance: 4,080; Referee: Fiorenzo Treossi (Italy)

30 September 1999 Second leg	Sporting CP (Portugal)	1–0 (1–3 agg.)	(Norway) Viking	Lisbon, Portugal
20:00	Ayew 71'			Stadium: Estádio José Alvalade; Attendance: 17,000; Referee: Marcel Lica (Romania)
