= 2002–03 Sporting CP season =

Sporting CP
2002–03 season
- Chairman: António Dias da Cunha
- Manager: László Bölöni
- Stadium: José Alvalade
- Primeira Liga: 3rd
- Taça de Portugal: Quarterfinals
- UEFA Champions League: 3rd qualifying round
- UEFA Cup: 1st round
- Top goalscorer: Mário Jardel (11)
Home colours	Away colours

The 2002–03 season was Sporting Club de Portugal's 96th season in existence and the club's 69th consecutive season in the top flight of Portuguese football. In addition to the domestic league, Sporting CP participated in this season's editions of the Taça de Portugal, UEFA Champions League Qualifying rounds and UEFA Cup. The season covers the period from 1 July 2002 to 30 June 2003.

== Season summary ==
As defending league winners, the club collapsed in this season, finishing a massive 27 points behind league leader Jose Mourinho's FC Porto. This was mainly due to issues in their attacking line, including an Mário Jardel injury in January. In Europe the team was eliminated early; in August the side was knocked out of the UEFA Champions League Qualifying round by Inter Milan. After that, in September Serbian club Partizan FK defeated Sporting in the UEFA Cup first round. At the end of the season 18-yr-old midfielder Cristiano Ronaldo left the club to be transferred to Manchester United.

== Squad ==
Note: Flags indicate national team as defined under FIFA eligibility rules; some limited exceptions apply. Players may hold more than one non-FIFA nationality.

No.	Pos.	Nation	Player
—	GK	POR	Ricardo
1	GK	POR	Nélson
12	GK	POR	Tiago
13	GK	POR	Nuno Santos
4	DF	ARG	Facundo Quiroga
6	MF	POR	Hugo
21	DF	MOZ	Paíto
22	DF	POR	Beto
23	DF	POR	Rui Jorge
3	MF	POR	Rui Bento
8	MF	POR	Pedro Barbosa
11	MF	CHI	Rodrigo Tello
15	DF	CHI	Pablo Contreras
17	MF	POR	Paulo Bento

No.	Pos.	Nation	Player
5	DF	BRA	César Prates
30	MF	ESP	Toñito
7	FW	ROU	Marius Niculae
10	FW	POR	Sá Pinto
25	MF	POR	João Pinto
20	MF	POR	Ricardo Quaresma
16	FW	BRA	Mário Jardel
9	FW	BLR	Vitali Kutuzov
28	MF	POR	Cristiano Ronaldo
14	MF	POR	Ricardo Fernandes
26	MF	POR	Carlos Martins
18	DF	POR	Luís Filipe
27	MF	POR	Custódio
29	MF	ANG	Lourenço
55	MF	BRA	Marcos Paulo
32	MF	POR	João Paulo
19	MF	POR	Danny

== Competitions ==
=== Primeira Liga ===
==== Standings ====
Pos	Team	Pld	W	D	L	GF	GA	GD	Pts	Qualification or relegation
1	Porto (C)	34	27	5	2	73	26	+47	86	Qualification to Champions League group stage
2	Benfica	34	23	6	5	74	27	+47	75	Qualification to Champions League third qualifying round
3	Sporting CP	34	17	8	9	52	38	+14	59	Qualification to UEFA Cup first round
4	Vitória de Guimarães	34	14	8	12	47	46	+1	50	
5	União de Leiria	34	13	10	11	49	47	+2	49	Qualification to UEFA Cup qualifying round (Note: Leiria qualified for the UEFA Cup as Portuguese Cup runners-up)

Source: Primeira Liga
Rules for classification: 1) points; 2) head-to-head points; 3) head-to-head goal difference; 4) goal difference; 5) number of goals scored
(C) Champions

==== Results by round ====
Round	1	2	3	4	5	6	7	8	9	10	11	12	13	14	15	16	17	18	19	20	21	22	23	24	25	26	27	28	29	30	31	32	33	34
Ground	H	A	H	A	H	A	H	A	H	A	A	H	A	H	A	H	A	A	H	A	H	A	H	A	H	A	H	H	A	H	A	H	A	H
Result	D	W	L	D	L	W	W	W	L	W	W	W	L	L	W	W	L	W	W	W	D	W	W	D	D	L	D	W	D	W	D	D	L	L
Position	3	2	6	7	8	8	4	2	6	3	2	2	3	5	4	3	3	3	3	3	3	3	3	3	3	3	3	3	3	3	3	3	3	3

Source: FootballPortugal
A = Away; H = Home; W = Win; D = Draw; L = Loss; = Leader, UEFA Champions League Groups stage; = 2003-04 UEFA Champions League Qualifying round; = 2003-04 UEFA Cup

==== Matches ====
23 August 2002 1	Académica	0–2	Sporting CP	Coimbra
			Quaresma 43'; Tonel 64' (o.g.)

1 September 2002 2	Sporting CP	2–1	Santa Clara	Lisbon
	Beto 43'; Pedro Barbosa 61' (pen.)		João Pedro 52' (pen.)	Stadium: José Alvalade

14 September 2002 3	Paços de Ferreira	4–0	Sporting CP	Paços de Ferreira
	Carneiro 33'; Bruno Mauro 36', 55', 89'			Stadium: da Mata Real

23 September 2002 4	Sporting CP	0–0	Varzim	Lisbon
				Stadium: José Alvalade

29 September 2002 5	Sporting Braga	4–2	Sporting CP	Braga
	Barroso 20', 35'; Jorge 23'; Glauber 48'		Kutuzov 24'; Tello 42'

7 October 2002 6	Sporting CP	3–0	Moreirense	Lisbon
	Kutuzov 30'; Ronaldo 34', 90+5'			Stadium: José Alvalade

20 October 2002 7	Sporting CP	2–0	Os Belenenses	Lisbon
	João Pinto 29'; Quaresma 89'			Stadium: José Alvalade

26 October 2002 8	Boavista	1–2	Sporting CP	Porto
	Martelinho 70'		Jardel 44' (pen.); Ronaldo 88'

2 November 2002 9	Sporting CP	0–3	Gil Vicente	Lisbon
			Manoel 3'; Gaspar 21'; Paulo Alves 90+5'	Stadium: José Alvalade

8 November 2002 10	Vitória de Guimarães	1–3	Sporting CP	Porto
	Bessa 62'		Jardel 18'; Toñito 51', 54'

15 November 2002 11	Sporting CP	2–0	Marítimo	Lisbon
	Contreras 89'; Niculae 90+4'			Stadium: José Alvalade

30 November 2002 12	Beira-Mar	1–3	Sporting	Aveiro
	Filipe 7'		Niculae 34'; Jardel 56'; Toñito 90+3'

7 December 2002 13	Sporting CP	0–2	Benfica	Lisbon
			Zahovič 15'; Tiago 42'	Stadium: José Alvalade

14 December 2002 14	União de Leiria	3–2	Sporting CP	Leiria
	Canhão 24'; Douala 64'; Aguiar 69'		João Pinto 30'; Contreras 80'

22 December 2002 15	Sporting CP	2–0	Nacional	Lisbon
	João Pinto 19', 56'	Report		Stadium: José Alvalade; Referee: Isidro Rodrigues

4 January 2003 16	Vitória de Setúbal	1–2	Sporting	Setúbal
	Mário Carlos 24'		Rui Jorge 50'; Pedro Barbosa 74' (pen.)

11 January 2003 17	Sporting	0–1	FC Porto	Lisbon
			Costinha 3'	Stadium: José Alvalade

25 January 2003 19	Santa Clara	0–1	Sporting CP	Ponta Delgada
			Toñito 8'

2 February 2003 20	Sporting	4–0	Paços de Ferreira	Lisbon
	Ricardo Fernandes 29'; Jardel 34', 72' (pen.), 86'			Stadium: José Alvalade

5 February 2003 18	Sporting	1–0	Académica	Lisbon
	Niculae 68'			Stadium: José Alvalade

8 February 2003 21	Varzim	1–1	Sporting	Póvoa de Varzim
	Carvalho 58'		João Pinto 34'

16 February 2003 22	Sporting	2–0	Sporting Braga	Lisbon
	Jardel 54', 60' (pen.)			Stadium: José Alvalade

24 February 2003 23	Moreirense	1–2	Sporting	Braga
	Armando 51'		Jardel 11'; Rui Bento 63'

1 March 2003 24	Os Belenenses	1–1	Sporting	Lisbon
	Rui Borges 81'		João Pinto 45'

16 March 2003 25	Sporting	1–1	Boavista	Lisbon
	Jardel 6' (pen.)		Jocivalter 21'	Stadium: José Alvalade

21 March 2003 26	Gil Vicente	1–0	Sporting	Barcelos
	Luís Coentrão 41'

6 April 2003 27	Sporting	1–1	Vitória de Guimarães	Lisbon
	Hugo 61'		Fangueiro 14'	Stadium: José Alvalade

19 April 2003 28	Marítimo	0–3	Sporting	Funchal
			Quiroga 26'; Sá Pinto 53' (pen.); Kutuzov 63'

25 April 2003 29	Sporting	1–1	Beira-Mar	Lisbon
	Jardel 62' (pen.)		Faye 47'	Stadium: José Alvalade

3 May 2003 30	Benfica	1–2	Sporting	Lisbon
	Šokota 73'		Quaresma 10'; João Pinto 33'

12 May 2003 31	Sporting	1–1	União de Leiria	Lisbon
	Toñito 67'		Maciel 22'	Stadium: José Alvalade

17 May 2003 32	Nacional	1–1	Sporting	Funchal
	Adriano 84'		Quaresma 60'

24 May 2003 33	Sporting	3–4	Vitória de Setúbal	Lisbon
	Paulo Bento 15'; João Pinto 26'; Quaresma 76'		Meyong 13', 90+3'; Beto 21' (o.g.); Jorginho 24'	Stadium: José Alvalade

1 June 2003 34	FC Porto	2–0	Sporting	Porto
	Postiga 36'; Contreras 78' (o.g.)			Stadium: das Antas

=== Taça de Portugal ===
24 November 2002 Fourth Round	Sporting CP	4–1	Estarreja	Lisbon
	Martins 2'; Niculae 22'; Ronaldo 67'; Danny 85'		Moita 17'

18 December 2002 Fifth Round	Sporting CP	8–1	Oliveira do Hospital	Lisbon
	Fernandes 1', 84'; Kutuzov 12', 69', 88'; Ronaldo 13'; Barbosa 59', 90'		Alex 41'

29 January 2003 Sixth Round	Estrela da Amadora	0–1	Sporting CP	Amadora
			Jardel 48'

9 March 2003 Quarter-finals	Sporting CP	0–1	Naval	Lisbon
			Costé 58'

=== Supertaça Cândido de Oliveira ===
18 August 2002 Final	Leixões	1–5	Sporting CP	Estádio do Bonfim, Setúbal
21:00	Antchouet 90'		R. Fernandes 32', 83'; Niculae 47'; Kutuzov 54'; C. Martins 87'	Attendance: 6,000; Referee: João Ferreira (Porto)

=== UEFA Champions League ===
==== Qualifying phase ====
===== Third qualifying round =====
14 August 2002 First leg	Sporting CP (Portugal)	0–0	(Italy) Internazionale	Lisbon, Portugal
22:00		Report	Morfeo (yellow card) 44'; Materazzi (yellow card) 62'	Stadium: José Alvalade; Attendance: 25,421; Referee: Rune Pedersen (Norway)

27 August 2002 Second leg	Internazionale (Italy)	2–0	(Portugal) Sporting CP	Milan, Italy
21:00	Di Biagio 31'; Recoba 44'	Report	Barbosa (yellow card) 39'; Rui Jorge (yellow card) 68'	Stadium: San Siro; Attendance: 51,405; Referee: René Temmink (Netherlands)

=== UEFA Cup ===
==== First round ====
19 September 2002	Sporting CP (Portugal)	1–3	(Federal Republic of Yugoslavia) Partizan	Lisbon, Portugal
22:00	Toñito 27'	Report	Hugo 12' (o.g.); Delibašić 37'; Iliev 79'	Stadium: José Alvalade; Attendance: 12,210; Referee: Fiorenzo Treossi (Italy)

3 October 2002	Partizan (Federal Republic of Yugoslavia)	3–3 (a.e.t.)	(Portugal) Sporting CP	Belgrade, Federal Republic of Yugoslavia
20:00	Delibašić 78'; Živković 110'; Čakar 117'	Report	Toñito 13'; Kutuzov 55'; Contreras 82'	Stadium: Partizan Stadium; Attendance: closed doors Referee: Fritz Stuchlik (Austria)

== Statistics ==
=== Players statistics ===
No.	Pos	Nat	Player	Total		Primeira Liga		Champions League		UEFA Cup	
No.	Pos	Nat	Player	Apps	Goals	Apps	Goals	Apps	Goals	Apps	Goals
1	GK	(Portugal) POR	Nélson	19	-26	19	-26				
15	DF	(Chile) CHI	Contreras	32	2	30	2	2	0		
4	DF	(Argentina) ARG	Quiroga	28	1	25+1	1	2	0		
6	DF	(Portugal) POR	Hugo	25	1	23+2	1				
3	DF	(Portugal) POR	Rui Bento	30	1	26+2	1	2	0		
17	DM	(Portugal) POR	Paulo Bento	29	1	23+6	1				
20	MF	(Portugal) POR	Quaresma	33	5	27+4	5	2	0		
30	MF	(Spain) ESP	Toñito	30	5	21+7	5	2	0		
25	MF	(Portugal) POR	João Pinto	25	8	25	8				
9	MF	(Belarus) BLR	Kutuzov	26	3	16+8	3	0+2	0		
16	FW	(Brazil) BRA	Jardel	19	11	17+2	11				
12	GK	(Portugal) POR	Tiago	17	-14	15	-12	2	-2		
23	DF	(Portugal) POR	Rui Jorge	24	1	18+4	1	2	0		
22	DF	(Portugal) POR	Beto	19	1	17	1	2	0		
11	MF	(Chile) CHI	Tello	15	1	15	1				
8	MF	(Portugal) POR	Barbosa	26	2	12+12	2	2	0		
5	DF	(Brazil) BRA	César Prates	20	5	11+7	5	2	0		
28	MF	(Portugal) POR	Ronaldo	26	3	11+14	3	0+1	0		
7	FW	(Romania) ROU	Niculae	19	3	9+8	3	2	0		
10	FW	(Portugal) POR	Sá Pinto	13	1	5+8	1				
14	MF	(Portugal) POR	Fernandes	8	1	5+1	1	0+2	0		
26	MF	(Portugal) POR	Martins	6	0	0+6	0				
18	DF	(Portugal) POR	Luís Filipe	3	0	2+1	0				
55	MF	(Brazil) BRA	Marcos Paulo	3	0	1+2	0				
32	MF	(Portugal) POR	João Paulo	6	0	1+5	0				
19	MF	(Portugal) POR	Danny	2	0	0+1	0	0+1	0		
13	GK	(Portugal) POR	Nuno Santos	1	0	0+1	0				
	GK	(Portugal) POR	Ricardo								
27	MF	(Portugal) POR	Custódio								
29	MF	(Angola) ANG	Lourenço								
21	DF	(Mozambique) MOZ	Paíto								

- Source: https://www.bdfutbol.com/en/t/t2002-035001.html?t=lista
