= 2002 Supertaça Cândido de Oliveira =

Football match

- Event: Supertaça Cândido de Oliveira
Leixões	Sporting CP
1	5
- Date: 18 August 2002
- Venue: Estádio do Bonfim, Setúbal
- Man of the Match: Ricardo Fernandes (Sporting CP)
- Referee: João Ferreira (Porto)
- Attendance: 6,000

The 2002 Supertaça Cândido de Oliveira was the 24th edition of the Supertaça Cândido de Oliveira, the annual Portuguese football season-opening match contested by the winners of the previous season's top league and cup competitions (or cup runner-up in case the league- and cup-winning club is the same). The match took place on the 18 August 2002 at the Estádio do Bonfim in Setúbal, and was contested between 2001–02 Primeira Liga and 2001–02 Taça de Portugal winners Sporting CP, and cup runners-up Leixões. This competition is notable as this would be the only silverware Cristiano Ronaldo won with Sporting before his transfer to Manchester United less than a year later.

Played in front of a crowd of 6,000, the Leões defeated the Heróis do Mar 5–1. Goals in either half from attacking midfielder Ricardo Fernandes, strikes from Sporting strikers Marius Niculae and Vitali Kutuzov, and an 87th-minute goal from Carlos Martins saw Sporting CP defeat the opposition comfortably and raise the club's tally to five trophies in this competition.

== Match ==
=== Details ===
18 August 2002
21:00 WEST

Leixões	1–5	Sporting CP
Antchouet 90'		R. Fernandes 32', 83'; Niculae 47'; Kutuzov 54'; C. Martins 87'

Estádio do Bonfim, Setúbal
Attendance: 6,000
Referee: João Ferreira (Porto)

Leixões	Sporting CP

GK	24	(Portugal) Rui Marcos
RB	19	(Portugal) José António	(yellow card) 12' (red card) 41'
CB	3	(Portugal) Nuno Silva	(yellow card) 14'	(substituted off) 46'
CB	16	(Portugal) Sérgio Abreu	(yellow card) 33'
LB	5	(Portugal) Nené
RM	14	(Portugal) Bruno China
CM	7	(Portugal) Abílio (c)
CM	30	(Portugal) Zamorano		(substituted off) 59'
LM	17	(Portugal) Israel Sousa
CF	22	(Portugal) Guerra		(substituted off) 59'
CF	11	(Gabon) Henri Antchouet	(yellow card) 83'
Substitutes:
DF	4	(Portugal) Marco Aleixo		(substituted on) 46'
MF	10	(Bosnia and Herzegovina) Nail Beširović	(yellow card) 85'	(substituted on) 59'
FW	8	(Portugal) Pedras		(substituted on) 59'
Manager:
(Portugal) Carlos Carvalhal

GK	12	(Portugal) Tiago
RB	15	(Chile) Pablo Contreras
CB	6	(Portugal) Hugo
CB	22	(Portugal) Beto	(red card) 43'
LB	23	(Portugal) Rui Jorge		(substituted off) 35'
RM	30	(Spain) Toñito
CM	17	(Portugal) Paulo Bento (c)	(yellow card) 74'
CM	14	(Portugal) Ricardo Fernandes	(yellow card) 45'
LM	20	(Portugal) Ricardo Quaresma		(substituted off) 64'
CF	9	(Belarus) Vitali Kutuzov	(yellow card) 58'
CF	7	(Romania) Marius Niculae		(substituted off) 58'
Substitutes:
GK	13	(Portugal) Nuno Santos
DF	5	(Brazil) César Prates	(yellow card) 62'	(substituted on) 35'
MF	19	(Portugal) Danny		(substituted on) 58'
MF	26	(Portugal) Carlos Martins	(yellow card) 66'	(substituted on) 64'
MF	8	(Portugal) Pedro Barbosa
MF	28	(Portugal) Cristiano Ronaldo
Manager:
(Romania) László Bölöni

Man of the Match:

- (Portugal) Ricardo Fernandes (Sporting CP)

Match officials

- Assistant referees:
- Fourth official:

Match rules

- 90 minutes
- 30 minutes of extra time if necessary.
- Penalty shoot-out if scores level after extra-time
- Maximum of three substitutions

== See also ==
- 2002–03 Primeira Liga
- 2002–03 Taça de Portugal
- 2002–03 Sporting CP season
