= Messi–Ronaldo rivalry =

Football rivalry between Lionel Messi and Cristiano Ronaldo

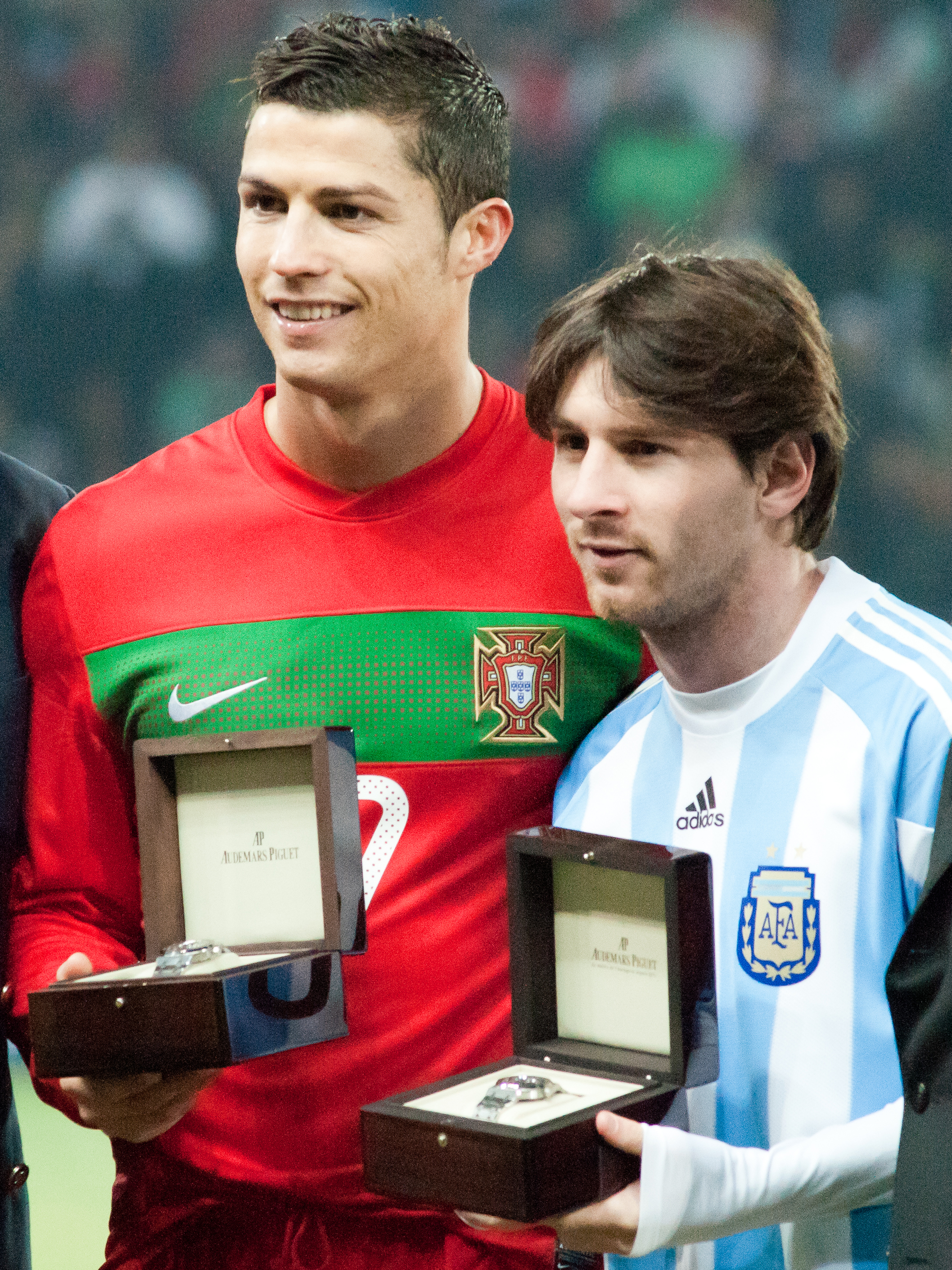
Cristiano Ronaldo (left) and Lionel Messi (right) before an international friendly between Argentina and Portugal, 9 February 2011

The Messi–Ronaldo rivalry, or Ronaldo–Messi rivalry, is a sporting rivalry in football propelled by the media and fans that involves Argentine footballer Lionel Messi and Portuguese footballer Cristiano Ronaldo, mainly for being contemporaries and due to their similar records and sporting successes. They spent nine seasons in the prime of their careers facing off regularly while playing for rival clubs Barcelona and Real Madrid.

Together, they have achieved various historical milestones, coming to be considered as two of the greatest footballers of all time. They are two of the most decorated players ever, having won 82 official trophies in total (Messi 47, (Note: According to FC Barcelona, FIFA, the Royal Spanish Football Federation, and multiple media outlets, Messi also won the 2005 Supercopa de España, bringing his Barcelona trophy total to 35. However, this particular trophy is not credited here since Messi was out of the squad and did not feature in either of the two matches against Real Betis. Similarly, Messi and Inter Miami were awarded a trophy for winning the Eastern Conference title during the 2025 MLS Cup playoffs. However, this trophy is not officially recognized by FIFA, so it is not credited here. For the aforementioned reasons, sources disagree on Messi's total number of accolades, ranging from 47 to 49 official career trophies.) Ronaldo 35 (Note: Per consensus of editors here. Ronaldo didn't play in the 2008 FA Community Shield or 2016 UEFA Super Cup so these titles are not credited here. For the aforementioned reason, sources disagree on Ronaldo's total number of accolades, ranging from 35 to 37 official career trophies.)) during their senior careers thus far, and have regularly broken the 50-goal barrier in a single season. According to IFFHS, they are the only two players to score over 900 goals each in their careers for club and country. Ronaldo holds the record for most official goals in a career.

Journalists and pundits regularly argue the individual merits of both players in an attempt to establish who they believe is the best player in modern football or ever. Regardless of preference, football critics generally agree that they are both the best players of their generation, outperforming their peers by a significant margin. Ronaldo has received praise for his physical attributes, goalscoring skills, and impact across multiple leagues, while Messi is lauded for his combination of dribbling, playmaking and goalscoring. Some commentators choose to analyse the differing physiques and playing styles of the two, while part of the debate revolves around the contrasting personalities of the two players; Ronaldo is sometimes described as someone of temperamental character while Messi is considered to have a more reserved personality. Several commentators and players opined that Messi settled the debate after leading Argentina to victory at the 2022 FIFA World Cup, although many continue to view the rivalry as a matter of personal perspective and lasting legacy.

The rivalry has been compared to past global sports rivalries such as the Ali–Frazier rivalry in boxing, the Prost–Senna rivalry in motorsport, and the Federer–Nadal rivalry in tennis.

== History ==
=== Origins ===
In 2007, Ronaldo and Messi finished as runners-up to AC Milan's Kaká in both the Ballon d'Or, an award rewarded to the player voted as the best in the world by an international panel of sports journalists, and the FIFA World Player of the Year, an award voted for by coaches and captains of international teams. In an interview that year, Messi was quoted as saying that "Cristiano Ronaldo is an extraordinary player and it would be brilliant to be in the same team as him." They first played in a game against each other when Manchester United were drawn to play Barcelona in the 2007–08 UEFA Champions League semi-finals and were immediately pitted as major rivals. Ronaldo missed a penalty in the first leg, but United eventually advanced to the final via a Paul Scholes goal.

The 2009 UEFA Champions League final was contested between Manchester United and Barcelona on 27 May 2009 at the Stadio Olimpico in Rome, Italy. The match, described as a "dream clash", was again hyped as the latest battle between the two, this time to settle who was the best player in the world. Ronaldo explained his belief in being the best player: "For me, you have to have that confidence at all times. That's what makes me the player I am." Messi's club-mate Xavi sided with his fellow Barcelona player: "Messi is the best player in the world by a distance, he's the No1." Manchester United manager Alex Ferguson was more diplomatic, praising both players as being amongst the world's elite talents. Barca successfully kept United at arm's length to win 2–0, with Messi scoring a rare header for his team's second goal.

=== El Clásico ===
On 11 June 2009, Manchester United accepted an offer of £80 million (€94 million) for Ronaldo to be transferred to Barcelona's El Clásico rivals Real Madrid. The transfer was confirmed on 1 July.

From 2009 to 2018, the two played against each other at least twice per season during El Clásico matches but also met many other times in competitions such as the Copa del Rey, the Supercopa de España, and a two-legged Champions League semi-final in 2011. This period was the most competitive in El Clásico history, with both players being their clubs' all-time top scorers. The two players alternated as top scorers in La Liga and the Champions League during most seasons while they were with Real Madrid and Barcelona.

=== 2009–10 ===
In the first league meeting between the two players, on 29 November 2009, it was Messi's Barcelona who came out on top, winning 1–0 with a goal from Zlatan Ibrahimović. In the second El Clásico of the season, Messi scored his 40th goal of the season in a 2–0 win. Messi was said to have made a fool out of Ronaldo by the Spanish press, which claimed that Ronaldo's "reign in the football world has ended".

=== 2010–11 ===
On 20 November 2010, the pair both scored hat-tricks on the same day for the first time; Ronaldo hit three goals against Athletic Bilbao in a 5–1 win, while Messi scored three as Barcelona thrashed Almería 8–0. The achievement was said to have proven why they are widely considered "the world's best players".

The two players faced each other whilst representing their international sides for the first time on 9 February 2011, as Argentina played Portugal in a friendly in Geneva, Switzerland, their first meeting for 40 years. Both players were on the scoresheet, with Ronaldo scoring an equaliser and being substituted before Messi scored an 89th-minute penalty to win the game 2–1.

The two came face-to-face in four pulsating games in the season finale, and the fixtures were hyped as the definitive games as to which of the two was the better player. In the first game of the series on 16 April 2011, Messi scored a 51st-minute penalty to give Barcelona the lead until the 82nd minute, when Ronaldo scored a penalty of his own to give Real Madrid a share of the points. In the second game, the 2011 Copa del Rey Final, Ronaldo scored the only goal of the game in extra time to give Real Madrid a 1–0 win, and the club's first trophy under manager José Mourinho. The third game was the first leg of the Champions League semi-final. The match was ugly and ill-tempered, with Madrid's Pepe sent off and both Madrid's coach José Mourinho and Barcelona's substitute goalkeeper José Manuel Pinto sent to the stands, before Messi scored two goals, including one described as "one of the best goals in Champions League history", to give Barcelona a two-goal lead in the tie. Following the game, Messi was praised as both the current best in the world and amongst the greatest players of all time. Of the seven goals scored in the four games, Messi scored three and Ronaldo scored two.

=== 2011–12 ===
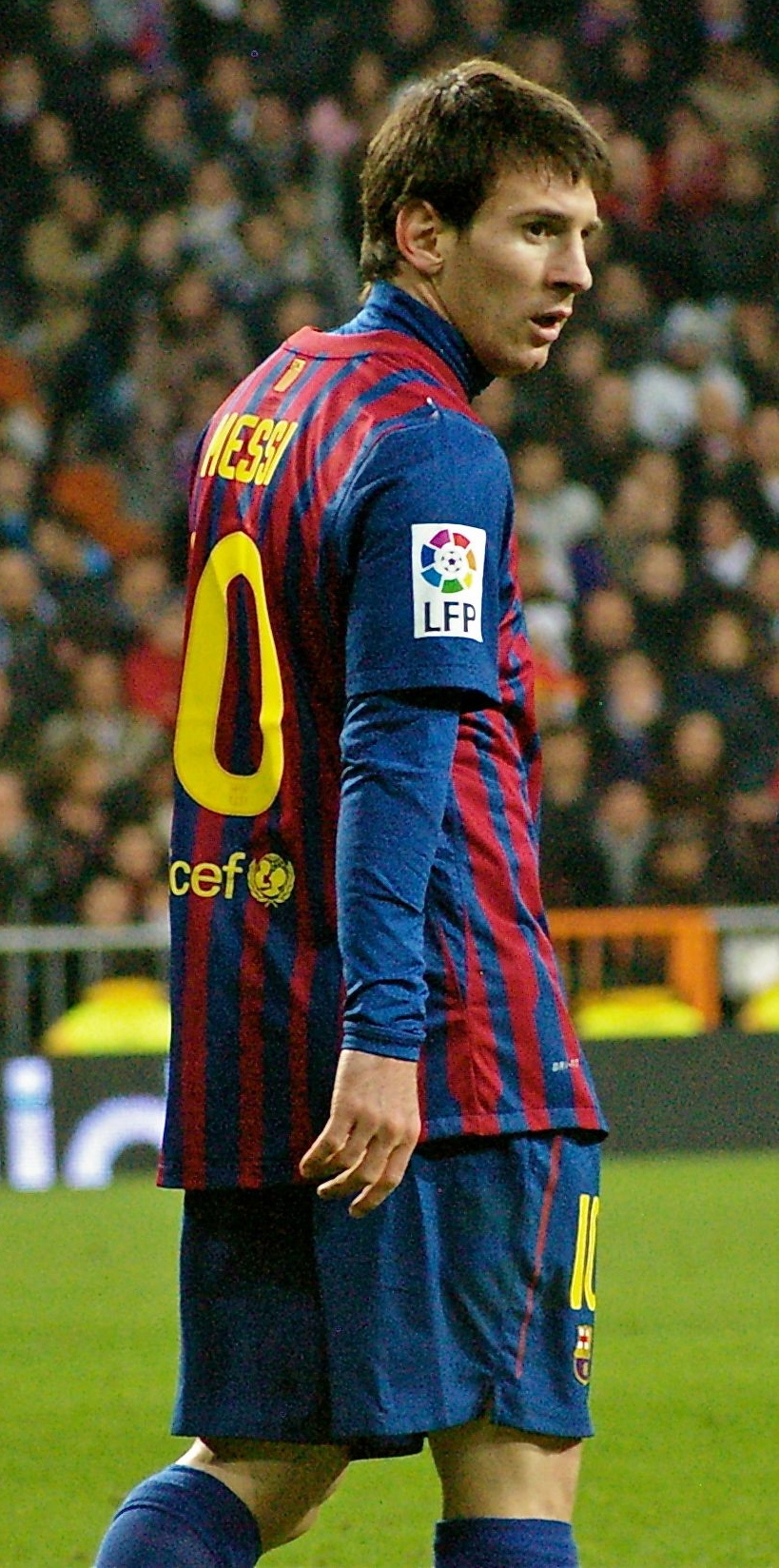
Messi finished 2012 with 91 goals, breaking the previous record held by Gerd Müller while winning his fourth consecutive FIFA Ballon d'Or.

On 24 September 2011, both players scored a hat-trick on the same day for the second time; Ronaldo scored three in a 6–2 win against Rayo Vallecano, and Messi scored three in a 5–0 win over Atlético Madrid.

Having been drawn against each other in the Copa Del Rey quarter-finals later in the month, Ronaldo scored a goal in each game, but Barcelona advanced 4–3 on aggregate.

On 21 April 2012, Ronaldo scored the winning goal in El Clásico as Real Madrid won 2–1 and closed in on the league championship.

=== 2012–13 ===
In the first El Clásico of the season on 7 October 2012, both players scored twice in a 2–2 at the Camp Nou, the sixth straight match between the two clubs that Ronaldo had scored in. Ronaldo scored in the 23rd minute to put Madrid 1–0 in front, then Messi scored two either side of half-time to put Barcelona in the lead, but for only five minutes before Ronaldo scored a 66th-minute equaliser. Messi finished the calendar year of 2012 with an all-time record of 91 goals for both club and country, overtaking Gerd Müller's record of 85 goals.

At the end of January, the players scored hat-tricks on the same day for the third time; Ronaldo scored three against Getafe as Real Madrid won 4–0 before Messi went one better by scoring four goals against Osasuna as Barcelona won 5–1. It was Ronaldo's 20th hat-trick and Messi's 200th career league goal. In the Copa Del Rey semi-final second leg, Ronaldo scored two goals to help Real Madrid advance to the final in a 3–1 victory. The goals meant he had scored in six consecutive El Clásico's at the Nou Camp.

=== 2013–14 ===
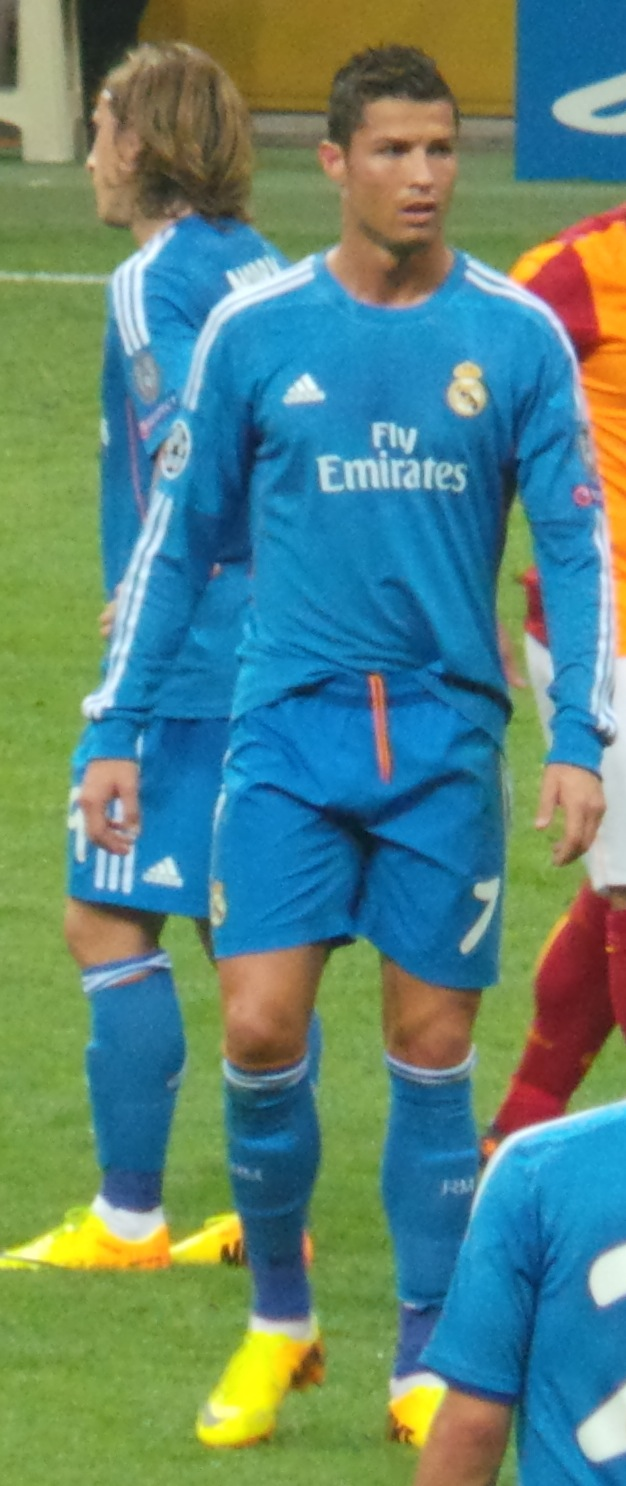
During the 2013–14 UEFA Champions League season, Ronaldo's 17 goals broke the record for the most goals scored by a player in a single season.

In September 2013, the players scored hat-tricks on the same Champions League matchday for the first time; Ronaldo scored three against Galatasaray as Real Madrid won 6–1, while a day later Messi scored a hat-trick against Ajax as Barcelona won 4–0. This latest accomplishment was said to "defy the accepted wisdom that football is a team game".

In the second El Clásico of the season on 23 March 2014, Messi became the all-time top scorer in the fixture after he scored a hat-trick, including two penalty kicks, as Barcelona defeated Real Madrid 4–3, while Ronaldo also scored a goal from the penalty spot which initially put Real Madrid 3–2 in front; it was a match described as "astonishing", "thrilling" and "the best Clasico in recent years".

=== 2014–15 ===
At the start of the season, the race to beat Raúl's Champions League goal scoring record of 71 goals dominated the headlines, with Messi beating Ronaldo to equal the record when he scored against Ajax on 5 November, and beating the record on 25 November with three goals against APOEL in a 4–0 victory. Following this milestone goal, Barcelona manager Luis Enrique claimed Messi was the "greatest player of all time". Ronaldo equalled Raúl's tally on 26 November when he scored the only goal of the game against Basel.

For the second time in the season, the two players faced each other, this time in the shirts of their respective nations at Old Trafford, and was their last meeting before the announcement of the 2014 FIFA Ballon d'Or. The British press called the match an "international version of the Premier League's 39th game", which claimed that it "offers unique opportunity for a new seam of support to become embroiled in the Ronaldo v Messi arguments". Portugal defeated Argentina 1–0, although neither Ronaldo nor Messi appeared on the score sheet.

On 3 November, in a 4–0 victory over Granada, Ronaldo made league history when he scored his 17th league goal of the season in just 10 games; the record was previously held by Isidro Lángara, who scored 16 goals in the first ten games of the 1935–36 season for Real Oviedo. On 22 November, Messi equalled, and then went past, Telmo Zarra's goalscoring record of 251 when he scored a hat-trick against Sevilla. Luis Enrique praised him following the achievement, saying that he is "one-of-a-kind and we'll never see anyone like him ever again and we are privileged to have him and be able to watch him". On 6 December, Ronaldo overtook Zarra's record of 22 La Liga hat-tricks, which he jointly held with Alfredo Di Stéfano, when he scored three against Celta Vigo. The goals meant he became the quickest player to reach 200 La Liga goals, accomplishing the feat in just 178 games, surpassing Zarra's record of 219 games to reach the milestone. The following day, Messi responded by scoring his third hat-trick in his four games, his 21st La Liga hat-trick in total. The continuous record breaking was said be down to the pairs' "spellbinding skill, relentless application, athletic charisma", while journalist Sid Lowe said that this latest accomplishment "probably doesn't count as a story any more".

On 5 April, Ronaldo scored five times in one game for the first time in his career, including an eight-minute hat-trick, in a 9–1 defeat of Granada in La Liga. He followed this up on 8 April with a goal against Rayo Vallecano in a 2–0 victory; his 300th Real Madrid goal. 10 days later, he became the second player in the history of football to score 50 or more goals in a season on five occasions, when he scored the third goal in a 3–1 victory against Málaga, while earlier in the day, Messi scored his 400th Barcelona goal in a 2–0 win against Valencia.

=== 2015–16 ===
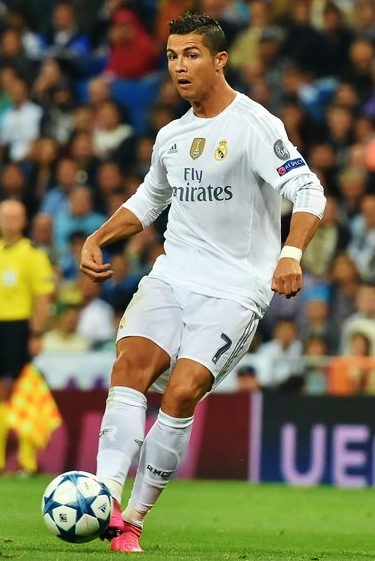
On 30 September 2015, Ronaldo surpassed 500 career goals and also became Real Madrid's joint all-time top goalscorer.

On 8 December 2015, Ronaldo set a Champions League record of 11 goals in the group stage after scoring four goals against Malmö. His four-goal haul equalled a club record in the competition, jointly held by Alfredo Di Stéfano, Ferenc Puskás, and Hugo Sánchez.

On 17 February 2016, Messi scored his 300th La Liga goal in a 1–3 away win against Sporting Gijon. By scoring four goals in a 7–1 home win over Celta Vigo on 5 March, Ronaldo arrived at 252 goals in La Liga to become the competition's second-highest scorer in history behind Messi. Ronaldo scored a hat-trick against Wolfsburg to send his club into the Champions League semi-finals despite a 2–0 first-leg defeat. The treble took his tally in the competition to 16 goals, making him the top scorer for the fourth consecutive season and the fifth overall.

=== Final meetings ===
Following Ronaldo's transfer to Juventus in the summer of 2018, the two faced each other only one more time in the next four seasons when Ronaldo's two goals from the penalty spot helped Juventus to a 3–0 away win against Messi's Barcelona in the 2020–21 UEFA Champions League group stage.

On 21 January 2023, the two played each other for the first time in over two years, as a combined team featuring Al-Hilal and Ronaldo's Al-Nassr was defeated 4–5 by Messi's Paris Saint-Germain in an exhibition friendly in Riyadh. Messi scored once and Ronaldo twice in the game, which was described as potentially being the last-ever match featuring both players.

=== Leaving Europe and end of rivalry ===
After Messi led Argentina to victory in the 2022 FIFA World Cup, a number of football critics, commentators and players have opined that Messi settled the debate between the two players.

Both players left the European stage in 2023, with Ronaldo joining Al-Nassr in Saudi Arabia while Messi joined Inter Miami CF in the United States. The 2023–24 season was thus the first since 2002 when neither Messi nor Ronaldo played in Europe, and it was seen by many as the end of an era. Both transfers were credited as being crucial in popularizing the sport in the Middle East and North America, and in helping establish them as the two rising powers in football outside of Europe.

In August 2023, both players won their first title with their new teams; Ronaldo helped Al-Nassr win the 2023 Arab Club Champions Cup for the first time in their history and was awarded the competition's top scorer award with six goals, while Messi helped Inter Miami win the 2023 Leagues Cup, the first-ever trophy in the club's history, and was awarded the competition's top scorer award with ten goals as well as the competition's best player award. In September 2023, Ronaldo declared that his rivalry with Messi was over and "gone", after 36 official fixtures and 15 years of "sharing the stage".

== Relationship between Messi and Ronaldo ==
In a 2016 interview, Ronaldo commented on the rivalry by saying: "I think we push each other sometimes in the competition, this is why the competition is so high." Alex Ferguson, Ronaldo's manager during his time at Manchester United, opined: "I don't think the rivalry against each other bothers them. I think they have their own personal pride in terms of wanting to be the best." Messi has denied any rivalry, and blames the media for creating it, stating that "only the media, the press, who wants us to be at loggerheads but I've never fought with Cristiano."

It is widely argued and documented that there is an atmosphere of competition between the duo, with Guillem Balagué claiming in the book Ronaldo that he refers to his Argentine counterpart as a "motherfucker" behind his back. Ronaldo denied the claims in a post on Facebook and threatened to take legal action over the remarks made by Balagué, writing that he has "the utmost respect for all my professional colleagues, and Messi is obviously no exception." Luca Caioli wrote in his book Ronaldo: The Obsession for Perfection that, according to his sources, Ronaldo heats up when watching Messi play. In response to claims that he and Messi do not get on well on a personal level, Ronaldo commented: "We don't have a relationship outside the world of football, just as we don't with a lot of other players", before adding that in years to come he hopes they can laugh about it together, stating: "We have to look on this rivalry with a positive spirit, because it's a good thing." After Ronaldo's departure from Real Madrid to Juventus, Messi stated: "I miss Cristiano. Although it was a bit difficult to see him win trophies, he gave La Liga prestige." During a joint interview at the UEFA Men's Player of the Year Award ceremony in 2019, Ronaldo said he would like to "have dinner together in the future", to which Messi later replied: "If I get an invitation, why not?"

== Awards and records ==
"When they will not be there anymore, we will realise what they have given us. Both of them. I always refuse to make a hierarchy on that because they are two different players. Completely different players, but two exceptional players who have shown the world for 15 years how great football can be."

— FIFA's Chief of Global Football Development Arsène Wenger sums up the Lionel Messi vs Cristiano Ronaldo rivalry at The Best FIFA Football Awards 2022.

Throughout the existence of the rivalry, the pair have dominated awards ceremonies and broken a multitude of goalscoring records for both club and country, feats which have been described as "incredible", "ridiculous" and "remarkable". The rivalry itself has been described as one about records and reputation of the players, rather than one based in loathing.

Messi is the all-time La Liga top scorer, as well as having the most assists in the competition's history – with Ronaldo in second for goals scored and in fourth for assists provided – while Ronaldo is the UEFA Champions League all-time top appearance maker, goalscorer and the second-highest in assists after Ryan Giggs, according to Opta statistics, which began in 1992, with Messi in third for both appearances and assists provided and in second for goals scored in the competition's history. They are the first two players to score 100 goals in UEFA Champions League history. Ronaldo also holds the records for most international caps and most international goals, with Messi ranking second in both appearances and goals scored.

The pair dominated the Ballon d'Or/The Best FIFA Men's Player awards since 2008, and UEFA Men's Player of the Year Award since 2014; in 2018, their longer than a decade triumph was interrupted by Luka Modrić, seen as "the end of an era". In an interview for the France Football, Modrić stated that "history will say that a Croatian player, representing his small country, won the Ballon d'Or after Cristiano Ronaldo and Lionel Messi, who are players at another level. Nobody has the right to compare themselves to them."

Ronaldo holds the record for most Ballon d'Or nominations with 18 while Messi is the second most-nominated footballer with 16. Messi won four consecutive Ballon d'Or awards (2009 to 2012), with a fifth coming in 2015, while Ronaldo had equalled Messi's total of five with wins in 2008, 2013, 2014, 2016, and 2017. In 2019, Messi took the lead again by earning a record sixth Ballon d'Or, finishing just seven points ahead of second-placed Virgil van Dijk, with Ronaldo finishing third. In 2020, the award was canceled due to the COVID-19 pandemic. In 2021 and 2023, Messi won his seventh and eighth Ballon d'Or, respectively. In total, Messi and Ronaldo reached the podium a record fourteen and twelve times, respectively. Combining Ballon d'Or, FIFA World Player of the Year and The Best FIFA Men's Player, Messi outperformed Ronaldo 12 to 8 in wins and 24 to 20 in podium finishes. Messi is also the only player in history to win the Ballon d'Or with 3 different clubs (Barcelona, Paris Saint Germain and Inter Miami).

The pair's goal-scoring prowess resulted in a number of individual top scorer accolades. Messi won eight Pichichi trophies and six European Golden Shoe awards (2010, 2012, 2013, 2017, 2018 and 2019). Ronaldo won the European Golden Shoe award on four occasions (2008, 2011, 2014 and 2015) and remains the only footballer with top-flight top scorer awards in England (2008), Spain (2011, 2014 and 2015) and Italy (2021). He was the Champions League top scorer on seven occasions, with Messi achieving this feat six times (including in 2015 when the pair finished joint-top).

Messi has won a world record 47 total official trophies (including a club record 34 major trophies as a Barcelona player), claiming twelve league titles, four UEFA Champions Leagues, seven Copa del Rey titles, seven Spanish Super Cups, one French Super Cup, three European Super Cups, three FIFA Club World Cups, one Leagues Cup and one MLS Cup. Messi was runner-up at three Copa Américas and at the 2014 World Cup, before finally claiming his first major international trophy at the 2021 Copa América, where he was named best player. The following year, Messi led Argentina to the 2022 World Cup trophy, where he won a record second Golden Ball award. He then won a second consecutive Copa América in 2024.

Ronaldo has won 35 official trophies, including eight league titles and five UEFA Champions Leagues, and guided Portugal to the UEFA European Championship in 2016 and the UEFA Nations League in 2019 and 2025, the nation's first major trophies. He has won all national top-tier club competitions in England, Spain and Italy, including four national cups, two league cups, and six national super cups. In addition, he won two European Super Cups, four FIFA Club World Cups, and one Arab Club Champions Cup.

On 4 September 2024, neither Messi nor Cristiano were nominated among the 30 candidates for the Ballon d'Or for the first time since 2003.

== Player statistics ==
=== Club statistics ===
As of 20 October 2026

Lionel Messi
Club	Season	League		Cup		Continental		Other		Total	
Club	Season	Apps	Goals	Apps	Goals	Apps	Goals	Apps	Goals	Apps	Goals
———————————————————————————————————
———————————————————————————————————
Barcelona
Barcelona	2004–05	7	1	1	0	1	0	—		9	1
Barcelona	2005–06	17	6	2	1	6	1	0	0	25	8
Barcelona	2006–07	26	14	2	2	5	1	3	0	36	17
Barcelona	2007–08	28	10	3	0	9	6	—		40	16
Barcelona	2008–09	31	23	8	6	12	9	—		51	38
Barcelona	2009–10	35	34	3	1	11	8	4	4	53	47
Barcelona	2010–11	33	31	7	7	13	12	2	3	55	53
Barcelona	2011–12	37	50	7	3	11	14	5	6	60	73
Barcelona	2012–13	32	46	5	4	11	8	2	2	50	60
Barcelona	2013–14	31	28	6	5	7	8	2	0	46	41
Barcelona	2014–15	38	43	6	5	13	10	—		57	58
Barcelona	2015–16	33	26	5	5	7	6	4	4	49	41
Barcelona	2016–17	34	37	7	5	9	11	2	1	52	54
Barcelona	2017–18	36	34	6	4	10	6	2	1	54	45
Barcelona	2018–19	34	36	5	3	10	12	1	0	50	51
Barcelona	2019–20	33	25	2	2	8	3	1	1	44	31
Barcelona	2020–21	35	30	5	3	6	5	1	0	47	38
Paris Saint-Germain
Paris Saint-Germain	2021–22	26	6	1	0	7	5	—		34	11
Paris Saint-Germain	2022–23	32	16	1	0	7	4	1	1	41	21
Inter Miami
Inter Miami	2023	6	1	1	0	—		7	10	14	11
Inter Miami	2024	19	20	—		3	2	3	1	25	23
Inter Miami	2025	28	29	—		7	5	14	9	49	43
Inter Miami	2026	27	25	—		2	1	3	3	32	29
Total		658 (Note: Not including second and third division matches (Barcelona B and C, 2003–05).)	571	83	56	175	137	57	46	973	810

Cristiano Ronaldo
Club	Season	League		Cup		Continental		Other		Total	
Club	Season	Apps	Goals	Apps	Goals	Apps	Goals	Apps	Goals	Apps	Goals
Sporting CP
Sporting CP	2002–03	25	3	3	2	3	0	0	0	31	5
Manchester United
Manchester United	2003–04	29	4	6	2	5	0	0	0	40	6
Manchester United	2004–05	33	5	9	4	8	0	0	0	50	9
Manchester United	2005–06	33	9	6	2	8	1	—		47	12
Manchester United	2006–07	34	17	8	3	11	3	—		53	23
Manchester United	2007–08	34	31	3	3	11	8	1	0	49	42
Manchester United	2008–09	33	18	6	3	12	4	2	1	53	26
Real Madrid
Real Madrid	2009–10	29	26	0	0	6	7	—		35	33
Real Madrid	2010–11	34	40	8	7	12	6	—		54	53
Real Madrid	2011–12	38	46	5	3	10	10	2	1	55	60
Real Madrid	2012–13	34	34	7	7	12	12	2	2	55	55
Real Madrid	2013–14	30	31	6	3	11	17	—		47	51
Real Madrid	2014–15	35	48	2	1	12	10	5	2	54	61
Real Madrid	2015–16	36	35	0	0	12	16	—		48	51
Real Madrid	2016–17	29	25	2	1	13	12	2	4	46	42
Real Madrid	2017–18	27	26	0	0	13	15	4	3	44	44
Juventus
Juventus	2018–19	31	21	2	0	9	6	1	1	43	28
Juventus	2019–20	33	31	4	2	8	4	1	0	46	37
Juventus	2020–21	33	29	4	2	6	4	1	1	44	36
Juventus	2021–22	1	0	—		—		—		1	0
Manchester United
Manchester United	2021–22	30	18	1	0	7	6	—		38	24
Manchester United	2022–23	10	1	0	0	6	2	—		16	3
Al-Nassr
Al-Nassr	2022–23	16	14	2	0	—		1	0	19	14
Al-Nassr	2023–24	31	35	4	3	9	6	7	6	51	50
Al-Nassr	2024–25	30	25	1	0	8	8	2	2	41	35
Al-Nassr	2025–26	30	28	1	0	4	1	2	1	37	30
Al-Nassr	2026–27	8	4	0	0	2	1	0	0	10	5
Total		766 (Note: Not including second division matches (Sporting CP B, 2002–03).)	604	90	48	218	159	33	24	1,107	835

=== International statistics ===
Lionel Messi
National team	Year	Competitive		Friendly		Total	
National team	Year	Apps	Goals	Apps	Goals	Apps	Goals
—————————————————
—————————————————
Argentina	2005	3	0	2	0	5	0
Argentina	2006	3	1	4	1	7	2
Argentina	2007	10	4	4	2	14	6
Argentina	2008	6	1	2	1	8	2
Argentina	2009	8	1	2	2	10	3
Argentina	2010	5	0	5	2	10	2
Argentina	2011	8	2	5	2	13	4
Argentina	2012	5	5	4	7	9	12
Argentina	2013	5	3	2	3	7	6
Argentina	2014	7	4	7	4	14	8
Argentina	2015	6	1	2	3	8	4
Argentina	2016	10	8	1	0	11	8
Argentina	2017	5	4	2	0	7	4
Argentina	2018	4	1	1	3	5	4
Argentina	2019	6	1	4	4	10	5
Argentina	2020	4	1	0	0	4	1
Argentina	2021	16	9	0	0	16	9
Argentina	2022	10	8	4	10	14	18
Argentina	2023	5	3	3	5	8	8
Argentina	2024	9	4	2	2	11	6
Argentina	2025	3	2	2	1	5	3
Argentina	2026	8	8	4	3	12	11
Total		146	71	62	55	208	126

Cristiano Ronaldo
National team	Year	Competitive		Friendly		Total	
National team	Year	Apps	Goals	Apps	Goals	Apps	Goals
Portugal	2003	0	0	2	0	2	0
Portugal	2004	11	7	5	0	16	7
Portugal	2005	7	2	4	0	11	2
Portugal	2006	10	4	4	2	14	6
Portugal	2007	9	5	1	0	10	5
Portugal	2008	5	1	3	0	8	1
Portugal	2009	5	0	2	1	7	1
Portugal	2010	6	3	5	0	11	3
Portugal	2011	6	5	2	2	8	7
Portugal	2012	9	4	4	1	13	5
Portugal	2013	6	7	3	3	9	10
Portugal	2014	5	3	4	2	9	5
Portugal	2015	4	3	1	0	5	3
Portugal	2016	10	10	3	3	13	13
Portugal	2017	10	10	1	1	11	11
Portugal	2018	4	4	3	2	7	6
Portugal	2019	10	14	0	0	10	14
Portugal	2020	4	2	2	1	6	3
Portugal	2021	11	11	3	2	14	13
Portugal	2022	12	3	0	0	12	3
Portugal	2023	9	10	0	0	9	10
Portugal	2024	10	5	2	2	12	7
Portugal	2025	9	8	0	0	9	8
Portugal	2026	6	3	2	0	8	3
Total		178	124	56	22	234	146

=== Hat-tricks ===
As of 29 October 2026

Lionel Messi
No.	For	Against	Result	Competition	Date
1	Barcelona	Real Madrid	3–3 (H)	2006–07 La Liga	10 March 2007
2	Barcelona	Atlético Madrid	3–1 (A)	2008–09 Copa del Rey	6 January 2009
3	Barcelona	Tenerife	5–0 (A)	2009–10 La Liga	10 January 2010
4	Barcelona	Valencia	3–0 (H)	2009–10 La Liga	14 March 2010
5	Barcelona	Zaragoza	4–2 (A)	2009–10 La Liga	21 March 2010
6	Barcelona	Arsenal ^{4}	4–1 (H)	2009–10 UEFA Champions League	6 April 2010
7	Barcelona	Sevilla	4–0 (H)	2010 Supercopa de España	21 August 2010
8	Barcelona	Almería	8–0 (A)	2010–11 La Liga	20 November 2010
9	Barcelona	Real Betis	5–0 (H)	2010–11 Copa del Rey	12 January 2011
10	Barcelona	Atlético Madrid	3–0 (H)	2010–11 La Liga	5 February 2011
11	Barcelona	Osasuna	8–0 (H)	2011–12 La Liga	17 September 2011
12	Barcelona	Atlético Madrid	5–0 (H)	2011–12 La Liga	24 September 2011
13	Barcelona	Mallorca	5–0 (H)	2011–12 La Liga	29 October 2011
14	Barcelona	Viktoria Plzeň	4–0 (A)	2011–12 UEFA Champions League	1 November 2011
15	Barcelona	Málaga	4–1 (A)	2011–12 La Liga	22 January 2012
16	Barcelona	Valencia ^{4}	5–1 (H)	2011–12 La Liga	19 February 2012
17	Argentina	Switzerland	3–1 (A)	Friendly	29 February 2012
18	Barcelona	Bayer Leverkusen ^{5}	7–1 (H)	2011–12 UEFA Champions League	7 March 2012
19	Barcelona	Espanyol ^{4}	4–0 (H)	2011–12 La Liga	20 March 2012
20	Barcelona	Granada	5–3 (H)	2011–12 La Liga	2 May 2012
21	Barcelona	Málaga	4–1 (H)	2011–12 La Liga	5 May 2012
22	Argentina	Brazil	4–3 (N)	Friendly	9 June 2012
23	Barcelona	Deportivo La Coruña	5–4 (A)	2012–13 La Liga	20 October 2012
24	Barcelona	Osasuna ^{4}	5–1 (H)	2012–13 La Liga	27 January 2013
25	Argentina	Guatemala	4–0 (A)	Friendly	14 June 2013
26	Barcelona	Valencia	3–2 (A)	2013–14 La Liga	1 September 2013
27	Barcelona	Ajax	4–0 (H)	2013–14 UEFA Champions League	18 September 2013
28	Barcelona	Osasuna	7–0 (H)	2013–14 La Liga	16 March 2014
29	Barcelona	Real Madrid	4–3 (A)	2013–14 La Liga	23 March 2014
30	Barcelona	Sevilla	5–1 (H)	2014–15 La Liga	22 November 2014
31	Barcelona	APOEL	4–0 (H)	2014–15 UEFA Champions League	25 November 2014
32	Barcelona	Espanyol	5–1 (H)	2014–15 La Liga	7 December 2014
33	Barcelona	Deportivo La Coruña	4–0 (A)	2014–15 La Liga	18 January 2015
34	Barcelona	Levante	5–0 (H)	2014–15 La Liga	15 February 2015
35	Barcelona	Rayo Vallecano	6–1 (H)	2014–15 La Liga	15 March 2015
36	Barcelona	Granada	4–0 (H)	2015–16 La Liga	9 January 2016
37	Barcelona	Valencia	7–0 (H)	2015–16 Copa del Rey	3 February 2016
38	Barcelona	Rayo Vallecano	5–1 (A)	2015–16 La Liga	3 March 2016
39	Argentina	Panama	5–0 (N)	Copa América Centenario	10 June 2016
40	Barcelona	Celtic	7–0 (H)	2016–17 UEFA Champions League	13 September 2016
41	Barcelona	Manchester City	4–0 (H)	2016–17 UEFA Champions League	19 October 2016
42	Barcelona	Espanyol	5–0 (H)	2017–18 La Liga	9 September 2017
43	Barcelona	Eibar ^{4}	6–1 (H)	2017–18 La Liga	19 September 2017
44	Argentina	Ecuador	3–1 (A)	2018 FIFA World Cup qualification	10 October 2017
45	Barcelona	Leganés	3–1 (H)	2017–18 La Liga	7 April 2018
46	Barcelona	Deportivo La Coruña	4–2 (A)	2017–18 La Liga	29 April 2018
47	Argentina	Haiti	4–0 (H)	Friendly	29 May 2018
48	Barcelona	PSV Eindhoven	4–0 (H)	2018–19 UEFA Champions League	18 September 2018
49	Barcelona	Levante	5–0 (A)	2018–19 La Liga	16 December 2018
50	Barcelona	Sevilla	4–2 (A)	2018–19 La Liga	23 February 2019
51	Barcelona	Real Betis	4–1 (A)	2018–19 La Liga	17 March 2019
52	Barcelona	Celta Vigo	4–1 (H)	2019–20 La Liga	9 November 2019
53	Barcelona	Mallorca	5–2 (H)	2019–20 La Liga	7 December 2019
54	Barcelona	Eibar ^{4}	5–0 (H)	2019–20 La Liga	22 February 2020
55	Argentina	Bolivia	3–0 (H)	2022 FIFA World Cup qualification	9 September 2021
56	Argentina	Estonia ^{5}	5–0 (N)	Friendly	5 June 2022
57	Argentina	Curaçao	7–0 (H)	Friendly	28 March 2023
58	Argentina	Bolivia	6–0 (H)	2026 FIFA World Cup qualification	15 October 2024
59	Inter Miami	New England Revolution	6–2 (H)	2024 Major League Soccer season	19 October 2024
60	Inter Miami	Nashville SC	5–2 (A)	2025 Major League Soccer season	18 October 2025
61	Argentina	Algeria	3–0 (N)	2026 FIFA World Cup	16 June 2026
62	Inter Miami	CF Montréal ^{4}	7–1 (H)	2026 Major League Soccer season	29 August 2026

Cristiano Ronaldo
No.	For	Against	Result	Competition	Date
1	Manchester United	Newcastle United	6–0 (H)	2007–08 Premier League	12 January 2008
2	Real Madrid	Mallorca	4–1 (A)	2009–10 La Liga	5 May 2010
3	Real Madrid	Racing Santander ^{4}	6–1 (H)	2010–11 La Liga	23 October 2010
4	Real Madrid	Athletic Bilbao	5–1 (H)	2010–11 La Liga	20 November 2010
5	Real Madrid	Levante	8–0 (H)	2010–11 Copa del Rey	22 December 2010
6	Real Madrid	Villarreal	4–2 (H)	2010–11 La Liga	9 January 2011
7	Real Madrid	Málaga	7–0 (H)	2010–11 La Liga	3 March 2011
8	Real Madrid	Sevilla ^{4}	6–2 (A)	2010–11 La Liga	7 May 2011
9	Real Madrid	Getafe	4–0 (H)	2010–11 La Liga	10 May 2011
10	Real Madrid	Zaragoza	6–0 (A)	2011–12 La Liga	28 August 2011
11	Real Madrid	Rayo Vallecano ^{4}	6–2 (H)	2011–12 La Liga	24 September 2011
12	Real Madrid	Málaga	4–0 (A)	2011–12 La Liga	22 October 2011
13	Real Madrid	Osasuna	7–1 (H)	2011–12 La Liga	6 November 2011
14	Real Madrid	Sevilla	6–2 (A)	2011–12 La Liga	17 December 2011
15	Real Madrid	Levante	4–2 (H)	2011–12 La Liga	12 February 2012
16	Real Madrid	Atlético Madrid	4–1 (A)	2011–12 La Liga	11 April 2012
17	Real Madrid	Deportivo La Coruña	5–1 (H)	2012–13 La Liga	30 September 2012
18	Real Madrid	Ajax	4–1 (A)	2012–13 UEFA Champions League	3 October 2012
19	Real Madrid	Celta Vigo	4–0 (H)	2012–13 Copa del Rey	9 January 2013
20	Real Madrid	Getafe	4–0 (H)	2012–13 La Liga	27 January 2013
21	Real Madrid	Sevilla	4–1 (H)	2012–13 La Liga	9 February 2013
22	Portugal	Northern Ireland	4–2 (A)	2014 FIFA World Cup qualification	6 September 2013
23	Real Madrid	Galatasaray	6–1 (A)	2013–14 UEFA Champions League	17 September 2013
24	Real Madrid	Sevilla	7–3 (H)	2013–14 La Liga	30 October 2013
25	Real Madrid	Real Sociedad	5–1 (H)	2013–14 La Liga	9 November 2013
26	Portugal	Sweden	3–2 (A)	2014 FIFA World Cup qualification	19 November 2013
27	Real Madrid	Deportivo La Coruña	8–2 (A)	2014–15 La Liga	20 September 2014
28	Real Madrid	Elche ^{4}	5–1 (H)	2014–15 La Liga	23 September 2014
29	Real Madrid	Athletic Bilbao	5–0 (H)	2014–15 La Liga	5 October 2014
30	Real Madrid	Celta Vigo	3–0 (H)	2014–15 La Liga	6 December 2014
31	Real Madrid	Granada ^{5}	9–1 (H)	2014–15 La Liga	5 April 2015
32	Real Madrid	Sevilla	3–2 (A)	2014–15 La Liga	2 May 2015
33	Real Madrid	Espanyol	3–1 (A)	2014–15 La Liga	17 May 2015
34	Real Madrid	Getafe	7–3 (H)	2014–15 La Liga	23 May 2015
35	Portugal	Armenia	3–2 (A)	UEFA Euro 2016 qualifying	13 June 2015
36	Real Madrid	Espanyol ^{5}	6–0 (A)	2015–16 La Liga	12 September 2015
37	Real Madrid	Shakhtar Donetsk	4–0 (H)	2015–16 UEFA Champions League	15 September 2015
38	Real Madrid	Malmö FF ^{4}	8–0 (H)	2015–16 UEFA Champions League	8 December 2015
39	Real Madrid	Espanyol	6–0 (H)	2015–16 La Liga	31 January 2016
40	Real Madrid	Celta Vigo ^{4}	7–1 (H)	2015–16 La Liga	5 March 2016
41	Real Madrid	VfL Wolfsburg	3–0 (H)	2015–16 UEFA Champions League	12 April 2016
42	Portugal	Andorra ^{4}	6–0 (H)	2018 FIFA World Cup qualification	7 October 2016
43	Real Madrid	Alavés	4–1 (A)	2016–17 La Liga	29 October 2016
44	Real Madrid	Atlético Madrid	3–0 (A)	2016–17 La Liga	19 November 2016
45	Real Madrid	Kashima Antlers	4–2 (N)	2016 FIFA Club World Cup	18 December 2016
46	Real Madrid	Bayern Munich	4–2 (H)	2016–17 UEFA Champions League	18 April 2017
47	Real Madrid	Atlético Madrid	3–0 (H)	2016–17 UEFA Champions League	2 May 2017
48	Portugal	Faroe Islands	5–1 (H)	2018 FIFA World Cup qualification	31 August 2017
49	Real Madrid	Real Sociedad	5–2 (H)	2017–18 La Liga	10 February 2018
50	Real Madrid	Girona ^{4}	6–3 (H)	2017–18 La Liga	18 March 2018
51	Portugal	Spain	3–3 (N)	2018 FIFA World Cup	15 June 2018
52	Juventus	Atlético Madrid	3–0 (H)	2018–19 UEFA Champions League	12 March 2019
53	Portugal	Switzerland	3–1 (H)	2019 UEFA Nations League Finals	5 June 2019
54	Portugal	Lithuania ^{4}	5–1 (A)	UEFA Euro 2020 qualifying	10 September 2019
55	Portugal	Lithuania	6–0 (H)	UEFA Euro 2020 qualifying	14 November 2019
56	Juventus	Cagliari	4–0 (H)	2019–20 Serie A	6 January 2020
57	Juventus	Cagliari	3–1 (A)	2020–21 Serie A	14 March 2021
58	Portugal	Luxembourg	5–0 (H)	2022 FIFA World Cup qualification	12 October 2021
59	Manchester United	Tottenham Hotspur	3–2 (H)	2021–22 Premier League	12 March 2022
60	Manchester United	Norwich City	3–2 (H)	2021–22 Premier League	16 April 2022
61	Al-Nassr	Al-Wehda ^{4}	4–0 (A)	2022–23 Saudi Pro League	9 February 2023
62	Al-Nassr	Damac	3–0 (A)	2022–23 Saudi Pro League	25 February 2023
63	Al-Nassr	Al-Fateh	5–0 (A)	2023–24 Saudi Pro League	25 August 2023
64	Al-Nassr	Al-Tai	5–1 (H)	2023–24 Saudi Pro League	30 March 2024
65	Al-Nassr	Abha	8–0 (A)	2023–24 Saudi Pro League	2 April 2024
66	Al-Nassr	Al-Wehda	6–0 (H)	2023–24 Saudi Pro League	4 May 2024
67	Al-Nassr	Al-Kholood	5–3 (H)	2026–27 Saudi Pro League	29 October 2026

== Head-to-head ==
Over the time both Messi and Ronaldo played in La Liga, the Real Madrid–Barcelona rivalry has been "encapsulated" by the individual rivalry between Ronaldo and Messi to some extent. No El Clásico encounter between the two ever finished goalless.

Legend
Final
Semi-final

No.	Date	Competition	Home team	Score	Away team	Goals scored by the duo
1	23 April 2008	UEFA Champions League	Barcelona	0–0	Manchester United	
2	29 April 2008	UEFA Champions League	Manchester United	1–0	Barcelona	
3	27 May 2009	UEFA Champions League	Barcelona	2–0	Manchester United	Messi ( 70')
4	29 November 2009	La Liga	Barcelona	1–0	Real Madrid	
5	10 April 2010	La Liga	Real Madrid	0–2	Barcelona	Messi ( 33')
6	29 November 2010	La Liga	Barcelona	5–0	Real Madrid	
7	9 February 2011	International friendly	Argentina	2–1	Portugal	Ronaldo ( 21'), Messi ( 90' (pen.))
8	16 April 2011	La Liga	Real Madrid	1–1	Barcelona	Messi ( 51' (pen.)), Ronaldo ( 81' (pen.))
9	20 April 2011	Copa del Rey	Real Madrid	1–0 (a.e.t.)	Barcelona	Ronaldo ( 103')
10	27 April 2011	UEFA Champions League	Real Madrid	0–2	Barcelona	Messi ( 76', 87')
11	3 May 2011	UEFA Champions League	Barcelona	1–1	Real Madrid	
12	14 August 2011	Supercopa de España	Real Madrid	2–2	Barcelona	Messi ( 45+1')
13	17 August 2011	Supercopa de España	Barcelona	3–2	Real Madrid	Ronaldo ( 20'), Messi ( 53', 88')
14	10 December 2011	La Liga	Real Madrid	1–3	Barcelona	
15	18 January 2012	Copa del Rey	Real Madrid	1–2	Barcelona	Ronaldo ( 11')
16	25 January 2012	Copa del Rey	Barcelona	2–2	Real Madrid	Ronaldo ( 68')
17	21 April 2012	La Liga	Barcelona	1–2	Real Madrid	Ronaldo ( 73')
18	23 August 2012	Supercopa de España	Barcelona	3–2	Real Madrid	Ronaldo ( 55'), Messi ( 70' (pen.))
19	29 August 2012	Supercopa de España	Real Madrid	2–1	Barcelona	Ronaldo ( 19'), Messi ( 45')
20	7 October 2012	La Liga	Barcelona	2–2	Real Madrid	Ronaldo ( 23', 66'), Messi ( 31', 61')
21	30 January 2013	Copa del Rey	Real Madrid	1–1	Barcelona	
22	26 February 2013	Copa del Rey	Barcelona	1–3	Real Madrid	Ronaldo ( 12' (pen.), 57')
23	2 March 2013	La Liga	Real Madrid	2–1	Barcelona	Messi ( 18')
24	26 October 2013	La Liga	Barcelona	2–1	Real Madrid	
25	23 March 2014	La Liga	Real Madrid	3–4	Barcelona	Messi ( 42', 65' (pen.), 84' (pen.)), Ronaldo ( 55' (pen.))
26	25 October 2014	La Liga	Real Madrid	3–1	Barcelona	Ronaldo ( 35' (pen.))
27	18 November 2014	International friendly	Argentina	0–1	Portugal	
28	22 March 2015	La Liga	Barcelona	2–1	Real Madrid	Ronaldo ( 31')
29	21 November 2015	La Liga	Real Madrid	0–4	Barcelona	
30	2 April 2016	La Liga	Barcelona	1–2	Real Madrid	Ronaldo ( 85')
31	3 December 2016	La Liga	Barcelona	1–1	Real Madrid	
32	23 April 2017	La Liga	Real Madrid	2–3	Barcelona	Messi ( 33', 90+2')
33	13 August 2017	Supercopa de España	Barcelona	1–3	Real Madrid	Messi ( 77' (pen.)), Ronaldo ( 80')
34	23 December 2017	La Liga	Real Madrid	0–3	Barcelona	Messi ( 64' (pen.))
35	6 May 2018	La Liga	Barcelona	2–2	Real Madrid	Ronaldo ( 14'), Messi ( 52')
36	8 December 2020	UEFA Champions League	Barcelona	0–3	Juventus	Ronaldo ( 13' (pen.), 52' (pen.))
37	19 January 2023	Club friendly	Riyadh XI	4–5	Paris Saint-Germain	Messi ( 3'), Ronaldo ( 34' (pen.), 45+6')

=== Head-to-head summary ===
Competition	Matches played	Messi wins	Draws	Ronaldo wins	Messi goals	Ronaldo goals
La Liga	18	10	4	4	12	9
UEFA Champions League	6	2	2	2	3	2
Copa del Rey	5	1	2	2	0	5
Supercopa de España	5	2	1	2	6	4
International friendly	2	1	0	1	1	1
Club friendly	1	1	0	0	1	2
Total	37	17	9	11	23	23

Last updated 19 January 2023

== See also ==
- List of association football rivalries
