= Beto (footballer, born May 1976) =

Portuguese footballer (born 1976)

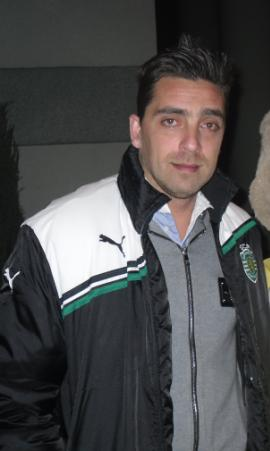
- Beto in 2012

Personal information
- Full name: Roberto Luís Gaspar de Deus Severo
- Date of birth: 3 May 1976 (age 50)
- Place of birth: Lisbon, Portugal
- Height: 1.85 m (6 ft 1 in)
- Position: Centre-back

Youth career
- 1987–1988: CAC Pontinha
- 1988–1994: Sporting CP

Senior career*
Years	Team	Apps	(Gls)
1994–2006	Sporting CP	241	(21)
1994–1995	→ União Lamas (loan)	21	(0)
1995–1996	→ Campomaiorense (loan)	18	(1)
2006–2007	Bordeaux	4	(0)
2006–2007	→ Recreativo (loan)	25	(2)
2007–2009	Recreativo	26	(2)
2009–2010	Belenenses	10	(0)
2011	Alzira	0	(0)
Total		345	(26)

International career
1996–1998	Portugal U21	13	(2)
1997–2004	Portugal	31	(2)
Medal record
Men's football
Representing Portugal
UEFA European Championship
Runner-up	2004 Portugal
Bronze medal – third place	2000 Belgium-Netherlands
FIFA U-20 World Cup
Third place	1995 Qatar
- * Club domestic league appearances and goals

Roberto Luís Gaspar de Deus Severo OIH (born 3 May 1976), known as Beto (Portuguese pronunciation: [ˈbɛtu]), is a Portuguese former professional footballer who played mainly as a central defender.

He played most of his professional career with Sporting CP (ten seasons, 315 official games and five major titles), but also had spells in France and Spain, which included spending three years with Recreativo de Huelva.

Beto represented the Portugal national team at the 2002 World Cup and two European Championships, winning 31 caps.

== Club career ==
=== Sporting CP ===
A product of Primeira Liga club Sporting CP, Lisbon-born Beto established himself in the first team in the 1996–97 season at the age of just 20, after two loans. As a defensive force and captain he scored some important goals, including against FC Porto, but also two own goals in a single match against rivals S.L. Benfica, a 1–2 home loss.

Beto won the national league twice, in 2000 and 2002, conquering the double the latter year. During his ten-year spell at the Estádio José Alvalade, he managed to net at least once in every season.

=== Recreativo ===
After falling out with Sporting coach Paulo Bento in January 2006, Beto joined Ligue 1 club FC Girondins de Bordeaux for €1 million, but appeared sparingly for the French in his five-month stint. On the last day of the summer transfer window that year, he was sent on loan to La Liga returnee Recreativo de Huelva.

On 1 July 2007, Beto signed a three-year permanent deal with the Andalusia side. After two solid first campaigns (netting twice in each, and partnering compatriots Carlos Martins and Silvestre Varela in 2007–08), he only played three matches in his last due to recurrent physical problems, as they eventually ranked last.

=== Retirement ===
After terminating his contract with Recreativo, the 33-year-old Beto signed for one year with C.F. Os Belenenses, in August 2009. As in latest years, his first season was blighted by constant injuries, and the capital side was also relegated.

In late January 2011, aged almost 35, Beto returned to Spain and agreed to a short-term deal at UD Alzira in the Segunda División B. He reunited at the club with former Sporting teammate Luís Lourenço, and both were released in June after the team's relegation, having appeared in a combined total of three games.

Beto returned to Sporting in August 2011, being appointed external public relations director. He quit his post two years later.

== International career ==
Beto made his Portugal debut on 6 September 1997, in a 1–1 draw against Germany for the 1998 FIFA World Cup qualifiers in Berlin. He was subsequently part of the nation's squads at the 2002 World Cup – where he scored against the United States, as the national team lost 3–2 and exited in the group stage (he played that competition as a right-back)– and both the 2000 and 2004 UEFA European Championships.

== Career statistics ==
Scores and results list Portugal's goal tally first, score column indicates score after each Beto goal.

List of international goals scored by Beto
No.	Date	Venue	Opponent	Score	Result	Competition
1	16 August 2000	Estádio do Fontelo, Viseu, Portugal	Lithuania	4–1	5–1	Friendly
2	5 June 2002	Suwon World Cup Stadium, Suwon, South Korea	United States	1–3	2–3	2002 FIFA World Cup

== Honours ==
Sporting CP

- Primeira Liga: 1999–2000, 2001–02
- Taça de Portugal: 2001–02
- Supertaça Cândido de Oliveira: 2000, 2002
- UEFA Cup runner-up: 2004–05

Portugal

- UEFA European Championship runner-up: 2004

Orders

- Medal of Merit, Order of the Immaculate Conception of Vila Viçosa (House of Braganza)
