= Rui Jorge =

Portuguese football manager and former player (born 1973)

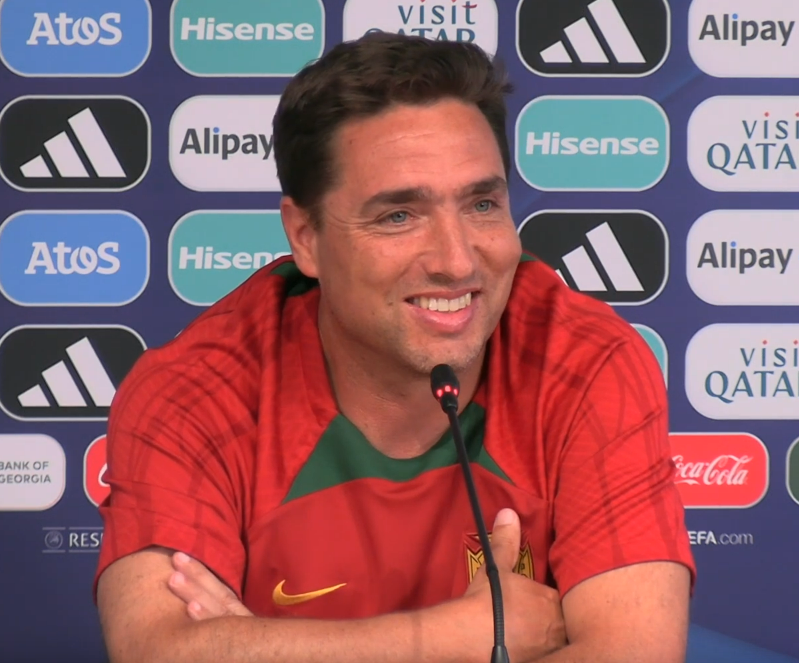
- Rui Jorge in 2023

Personal information
- Full name: Rui Jorge de Sousa Dias Macedo de Oliveira
- Date of birth: 27 March 1973 (age 53)
- Place of birth: Vila Nova de Gaia, Portugal
- Height: 1.70 m (5 ft 7 in)
- Position: Left-back

Youth career
- 1982–1991: Porto

Senior career*
Years	Team	Apps	(Gls)
1991–1998	Porto	86	(2)
1991–1992	→ Rio Ave (loan)	32	(2)
1998–2005	Sporting CP	191	(5)
2005–2006	Belenenses	15	(0)
Total		324	(9)

International career
1993–1994	Portugal U21	17	(0)
1996	Portugal U23	7	(0)
1994–2004	Portugal	45	(1)

Managerial career
- 2009: Belenenses
- 2010–2025: Portugal U21
- 2016: Portugal U23
Medal record
Men's football
Representing Portugal (as player)
UEFA European Championship
Bronze medal – third place	2000
Runner-up	2004
Representing Portugal (as manager)
UEFA European Under-21 Championship
Runner-up	2015
Runner-up	2021
- * Club domestic league appearances and goals

Rui Jorge de Sousa Dias Macedo de Oliveira OIH (born 27 March 1973), known as Rui Jorge, is a Portuguese former professional footballer who played as a left-back, currently a manager.

He spent 14 seasons in the Primeira Liga in a 15-year senior career, mainly in representation of Porto and Sporting CP, playing 292 matches and scoring seven goals in the competition. At international level, he appeared for Portugal at the 2002 World Cup and two European Championships.

After retiring from playing at age 33, Rui Jorge became a manager, starting with a short stint at Belenenses. He was appointed coach of the Portugal under-21 team in 2010, leaving his post in July 2025.

== Club career ==
Rui Jorge was born in Vila Nova de Gaia, Porto District. Having been brought up at local Porto, he made his professional debut with Rio Ave in the Segunda Liga, returning to his first club in 1992 after one season. Never an undisputed starter with the former (only appearing in more than 20 games twice over a six-year spell), he did help the northern side to five Primeira Liga championships and two Taça de Portugal trophies.

In July 1998, Rui Jorge signed with Sporting CP, where he would remain for the following seven years, being first choice during most of his stint and adding two more leagues to his trophy cabinet, with the double being claimed in 2002. In the 2005–06 campaign he played with another Lisbon team, Belenenses, subsequently retiring from the game – aged 33, with more than 400 official appearances – and joining his final club's youth coaching staff.

== International career ==
Rui Jorge played for the Portugal under-21 side which lost the 1994 UEFA European Championship final to Italy (2–1) and the Olympic team who finished fourth at the 1996 Summer Olympics in the United States. He also had 45 caps at full level, two while at Porto and 43 when with Sporting, and scored once in a 7–1 away win over Andorra on 1 September 2001. His first game for the latter was a 0–0 draw with Norway on 20 April 1994 in a friendly, and he represented his country at UEFA Euro 2000, the 2002 FIFA World Cup and Euro 2004.

Rui Jorge's participation at Euro 2004 on home soil was jeopardised when he tested positive in February that year for Budesonide, commercially known as Pulmicort. He said that the substance came from a medically recommended spray for his rhinitis. His suspension was lifted in May, with the fault placed on Sporting for not notifying authorities of his medical exemption; at the tournament, he was one of four players – three from defence – dropped by Luiz Felipe Scolari after the opening 2–1 loss to Greece, and did not return for the remainder of the competition, which Portugal lost in the final to the same team.

== Coaching career ==
In May 2009, Rui Jorge was appointed Belenenses' head coach for the final two matches of the season, taking over from Jaime Pacheco after a 0–5 home loss against Braga, with the team eventually ranking second-bottom (being later reinstated). At the end of the campaign, he returned to the youth system.

On 19 November 2010, Rui Jorge replaced Oceano at the helm of the Portuguese under-21s. He led them to the 2015 European Championships in the Czech Republic after ten wins in as many matches in the qualifying phase, and coached them to the second place in the finals following a penalty shootout defeat against Sweden.

Rui Jorge coached the Portuguese at the 2016 Olympic tournament in Brazil, where they lost 4–0 to Germany in the quarter-finals. He was also in charge for the 2017 edition of the under-21 continental tournament, which ended in group stage exit. On 10 October 2017, six years after the last loss for that stage of the competition, he was on the bench as the team lost 3–1 in Bosnia and Herzegovina for the 2019 European Championship qualifiers.

In November 2020, having already qualified for the 2021 European Championship, Rui Jorge celebrated a decade in the job; at that point he was the most experienced under-21 manager in Europe, and had served longer than all but four senior managers in the world. At the finals in Hungary and Slovenia the following June, his team finished as runners-up.

Rui Jorge left his post on 16 July 2025, after quarter-final elimination in the 2025 European Under-21 Championship at the hands of the Netherlands, who played 75 minutes with one player less.

== Career statistics ==
=== Club ===
Appearances and goals by club, season and competition
Club	Season	League		Cup		Europe		Other		Total	
Club	Season	Apps	Goals	Apps	Goals	Apps	Goals	Apps	Goals	Apps	Goals
Rio Ave (loan)	1991–92	32	2	3	0	—				35	2
Porto	1992–93	8	0	1	0	4	0	0	0	13	0
Porto	1993–94	24	0	6	1	10	1	1	0	41	2
Porto	1994–95	15	0	3	0	5	0	1	0	24	0
Porto	1995–96	22	2	5	0	2	0	2	0	31	2
Porto	1996–97	11	0	1	0	3	0	1	0	16	0
Porto	1997–98	6	0	2	0	2	0	1	0	11	0
Porto	Total	86	2	18	1	26	1	6	0	136	4
Sporting CP	1998–99	26	2	1	0	0	0	—		27	2
Sporting CP	1999–00	34	2	5	0	1	0	—		40	2
Sporting CP	2000–01	31	0	5	0	4	0	3	0	43	0
Sporting CP	2001–02	30	0	4	0	5	0	—		39	0
Sporting CP	2002–03	22	1	2	0	3	0	1	0	28	1
Sporting CP	2003–04	29	0	0	0	4	0	—		33	0
Sporting CP	2004–05	19	0	1	0	13	0	—		33	0
Sporting CP	Total	191	5	18	0	30	0	4	0	243	5
Belenenses	2005–06	15	0	0	0	—				15	0
Career total		324	9	39	1	56	1	10	0	429	11

=== International ===
Rui Jorge: International goals
No.	Date	Venue	Opponent	Score	Result	Competition
1	1 September 2001	Camp d'Esports, Lleida, Spain	Andorra	1–5	1–7	2002 World Cup qualification

== Managerial statistics ==
As of 21 June 2025

Team	From	To	Record							
Team	From	To	G	W	D	L	GF	GA	GD	Win %
Belenenses	12 May 2009	25 May 2009	2	1	0	1	2	3	−1	50.00
Portugal U21	19 November 2010	16 July 2025	127	90	19	18	325	105	+220	70.87
Portugal U23	28 March 2016	13 August 2016	5	3	1	1	9	6	+3	60.00
Career totals			134	94	20	20	336	114	+222	70.15

== Honours ==
=== Player ===
Porto

- Primeira Liga: 1992–93, 1994–95, 1995–96, 1996–97, 1997–98
- Taça de Portugal: 1993–94, 1997–98
- Supertaça Cândido de Oliveira: 1993, 1994, 1996

Sporting CP

- Primeira Liga: 1999–2000, 2001–02
- Taça de Portugal: 2001–02
- Supertaça Cândido de Oliveira: 2000, 2002
- UEFA Cup runner-up: 2004–05

=== Manager ===
Portugal

- UEFA European Under-21 Championship runner-up: 2015, 2021

=== Orders ===
- Medal of Merit, Order of the Immaculate Conception of Vila Viçosa (House of Braganza)
