= César Prates =

Brazilian footballer (born 1975)

Personal information
- Full name: César Luís Prates
- Date of birth: 8 February 1975 (age 51)
- Place of birth: Aratiba, Brazil
- Height: 1.74 m (5 ft 9 in)
- Position: Right back

Youth career
- 1993: Internacional

Senior career*
Years	Team	Apps	(Gls)
1994–1996	Internacional	20	(0)
1996–2000	Real Madrid B	15	(0)
1997–1998	→ Vasco Gama (loan)	11	(0)
1998–1999	→ Coritiba (loan)		
1999	→ Botafogo (loan)	5	(0)
1999	→ Corinthians (loan)	18	(1)
2000–2003	Sporting CP	84	(2)
2003–2004	Galatasaray	28	(3)
2004	Figueirense	16	(3)
2005	Botafogo	14	(6)
2005–2006	Livorno	33	(0)
2007	Chievo	3	(0)
2007–2008	Figueirense	17	(1)
2008	Atlético Mineiro	20	(1)
2009	Portuguesa	24	(0)
2010	Joinville		
2010	Náutico	21	(0)
Total		329	(17)

International career
1996–1997	Brazil	2	(0)
- * Club domestic league appearances and goals

César Luís Prates (born 8 February 1975) is a Brazilian retired footballer who played as a right back.

He was known for his powerful free kicks, and played for 15 clubs during his extensive professional career in five countries, his biggest spell being four years with Sporting Clube de Portugal, where he won four major titles.

== Football career ==
Born in Aratiba, Rio Grande do Sul, Prates started his career at Sport Club Internacional, where his steady performances attracted the attention of Real Madrid. He never made it, however, past its reserves, and initiated a series of loan moves in the subsequent seasons, almost always in Brazil.

In January 2000, Prates arrived (still on loan) alongside two other players to Sporting Clube de Portugal. All would be instrumental as the Lions ended an 18-year drought and conquered the Primeira Liga championship, and the move was made permanent subsequently.

Prates earned a lucrative deal in the 2003 summer with Turkey's Galatasaray SK, but could not settle at his new club, and moved after a few months to Figueirense Futebol Clube. After an impressive stint at Botafogo de Futebol e Regatas he moved overseas again, joining A.S. Livorno Calcio and being first-choice as the club finished sixth and reached the UEFA Cup.

In January 2007, Prates stayed in Italy and its Serie A, joining A.C. ChievoVerona and signing a two-year contract. Released in June he returned to his country, representing several sides until his retirement in 2010, aged 35.

== Honours ==
Internacional

- Campeonato Gaúcho: 1994

Vasco

- Campeonato Brasileiro Série A: 1997

Corinthians

- Campeonato Brasileiro Série A: 1999

Sporting

- Primeira Liga: 1999–2000, 2001–02
- Taça de Portugal: 2001–02
- Supertaça Cândido de Oliveira: 2000, 2002

Figueirense

- Campeonato Catarinense: 2008
