= Ricardo Fernandes (footballer, born April 1978) =

Portuguese footballer

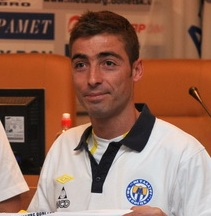

Personal information
- Full name: Ricardo Ribeiro Fernandes
- Date of birth: 21 April 1978 (age 48)
- Place of birth: Moreira de Cónegos, Portugal
- Height: 1.74 m (5 ft 9 in)
- Position: Attacking midfielder

Youth career
- 1987–1996: Aves
- 1996–1997: Moreirense

Senior career*
Years	Team	Apps	(Gls)
1997	Moreirense	2	(0)
1997–2000	Freamunde	57	(16)
2000–2003	Sporting CP	6	(1)
2000–2001	→ Santa Clara (loan)	28	(3)
2001–2002	→ Gil Vicente (loan)	32	(4)
2002–2003	Sporting B	9	(0)
2003–2004	Porto	13	(1)
2004–2005	Académica	21	(2)
2005–2008	APOEL	64	(16)
2008–2009	Metalurh Donetsk	37	(9)
2009	Anorthosis	9	(1)
2010	AEL Limassol	13	(2)
2010–2011	Hapoel Be'er Sheva	15	(0)
2011	Metalurh Donetsk	21	(5)
2012	Panetolikos	8	(1)
2012–2014	Doxa	39	(11)
2014	Omonia	13	(0)
2014–2015	Doxa	40	(8)
2016–2017	Trofense	28	(11)
2017–2018	Felgueiras 1932	25	(3)
Total		480	(94)
- * Club domestic league appearances and goals

Ricardo Ribeiro Fernandes (born 21 April 1978) is a Portuguese former professional footballer who played as an attacking midfielder for the club Moreirense.

He amassed Primeira Liga totals of 72 matches and eight goals during four seasons, representing in the competition Gil Vicente, Sporting, Porto and Académica. He also competed professionally in Cyprus, Ukraine, Israel and Greece, notably spending several years in the Cypriot First Division with five clubs and winning the national championship with APOEL in 2007.

== Career ==
=== Sporting, Porto ===
Fernandes was born in Moreira de Cónegos, Guimarães. After a number of impressive performances for Gil Vicente FC, with whom he made his Primeira Liga debuts in the 2001–02 campaign, he returned to Sporting CP who owned the player's rights; at the time, he was hailed as one of the country's brightest young prospects.

After only one season, Fernandes was signed by José Mourinho for his FC Porto side, which won the 2003–04 edition of the UEFA Champions League. He appeared sparingly for the club during his spell due to injury, playing only 19 games in all competitions as he was understudy to Portuguese international Deco, and left after another sole campaign.

=== APOEL ===
After a spell with Académica de Coimbra, Fernandes was signed onto a three-year deal to APOEL FC in Cyprus. In his first year, he became a crowd favorite with his accurate set pieces and creative passing, scoring nine times with many assists and also helping his team to the domestic cup.

In his second season, Fernandes netted five league goals as APOEL were crowned national champions.

=== Later years ===
Fernandes returned to Cyprus on 17 June 2009, signing a three-year contract with Anorthosis Famagusta FC. On 30 December 19 days after being released, he joined another team in that country, AEL Limassol.

On 4 June 2010, 32-year-old Fernandes signed a contract with Israel's Hapoel Be'er Sheva AFC, reuniting with former AEL coach Nir Klinger. In January 2011, however, he returned to former Ukrainian club FC Metalurh Donetsk.

== Career statistics ==
Appearances and goals by club, season and competition
Club	Season	League			National cup (Note: Includes Cypriot Cup, Ukrainian Cup and Greek Football Cup)		League cup		Continental (Note: Includes UEFA Super Cup, UEFA Champions League and UEFA Europa League)		Other (Note: Includes Supertaça Cândido de Oliveira and Cypriot Super Cup)		Total	
Club	Season	Division	Apps	Goals	Apps	Goals	Apps	Goals	Apps	Goals	Apps	Goals	Apps	Goals
Moreirense	1996–97	Segunda Liga	2	0	0	0	0	0	—		—		2	0
Freamunde	1997–98	Terceira Divisão	0	0	0	0	0	0	—		—		0	0
Freamunde	1998–99	Segunda Divisão	26	7	0	0	0	0	—		—		26	7
Freamunde	1999–00	Segunda Liga	31	9	1	0	0	0	—		—		32	9
Freamunde	Total		57	16	1	0	0	0	0	0	0	0	58	16
Santa Clara	2000–01	Segunda Liga	28	3	1	0	0	0	—		—		29	3
Gil Vicente	2001–02	Primeira Liga	32	4	1	0	0	0	—		—		33	4
Sporting	2002–03	Primeira Liga	6	1	3	2	0	0	2	0	—		11	3
Porto	2003–04	Primeira Liga	13	1	1	0	0	0	6	0	1	0	21	1
Académica	2004–05	Primeira Liga	21	2	0	0	0	0	—		—		21	2
APOEL	2005–06	Cypriot First Division	22	9	10	4	—		4	0	—		36	13
APOEL	2006–07	Cypriot First Division	23	5	8	1	—		4	2	1	0	36	8
APOEL	2007–08	Cypriot First Division	19	2	4	1	—		2	0	1	0	26	3
APOEL	Total		64	16	22	6	0	0	10	2	2	0	98	24
Metalurh Donetsk	2007–08	Ukrainian Premier League	10	1	0	0	0	0	—		—		10	1
Metalurh Donetsk	2008–09	Ukrainian Premier League	27	8	0	0	0	0	—		—		27	8
Metalurh Donetsk	Total		37	9	0	0	0	0	0	0	0	0	37	9
Anorthosis Famagusta	2009–10	Cypriot First Division	9	1	0	0	0	0	4	1	—		13	2
AEL Limassol	2009–10	Cypriot First Division	13	2	3	1	0	0	—		—		16	3
Hapoel Be'er Sheva	2010–11	Israeli Premier League	15	0	0	0	0	0	—		—		15	0
Metalurh Donetsk	2010–11	Ukrainian Premier League	9	4	0	0	0	0	—		—		9	4
Metalurh Donetsk	2011–12	Ukrainian Premier League	12	1	2	0	0	0	—		—		14	1
Metalurh Donetsk	Total		21	5	2	0	0	0	0	0	0	0	23	5
Panetolikos	2011–12	Super League Greece	8	1	1	0	—		—		—		9	1
Doxa Katokopias	2012–13	Cypriot First Division	25	6	3	0	—		—		—		28	6
Doxa Katokopias	2013–14	Cypriot First Division	14	5	1	0	—		—		—		15	5
Doxa Katokopias	Total		39	11	4	0	0	0	0	0	0	0	43	11
Omonia	2013–14	Cypriot First Division	13	0	2	0	—		—		—		15	0
Doxa Katokopias	2014–15	Cypriot First Division	27	6	0	0	—		—		—		27	6
Doxa Katokopias	2015–16	Cypriot First Division	13	2	0	0	—		—		—		13	2
Doxa Katokopias	Total		40	8	0	0	0	0	0	0	0	0	40	8
Trofense	2016–17	Campeonato Portugal	28	11	1	0	—		—		—		29	11
Felgueiras 1932	2017–18	Campeonato Portugal	25	3	3	1	—		—		—		28	4
Career total			467	94	45	10	0	0	22	3	3	0	537	107

== Honours ==
Freamunde

- Segunda Divisão B: 1998–99
- Terceira Divisão: 1997–98

Santa Clara

- Segunda Liga: 2000–01

Sporting

- Supertaça Cândido de Oliveira: 2002

Porto

- Primeira Liga: 2003–04
- Supertaça Cândido de Oliveira: 2003
- UEFA Champions League: 2003–04
- Taça de Portugal runner-up: 2003–04

APOEL

- Cypriot First Division: 2006–07
- Cypriot Cup: 2005–06
