= Toñito =

Spanish footballer (born 1977)

Personal information
- Full name: Antonio Jesús García González
- Date of birth: 24 February 1977 (age 49)
- Place of birth: La Orotava, Spain
- Height: 1.70 m (5 ft 7 in)
- Position: Attacking midfielder

Youth career
- Tenerife

Senior career*
| Years | Team | Apps | (Gls) |
| 1995–1997 | Tenerife B | 32 | (7) |
| 1997–1999 | Vitória Setúbal | 43 | (6) |
| 1999–2004 | Sporting CP | 86 | (9) |
| 2001–2002 | → Santa Clara (loan) | 30 | (7) |
| 2004–2005 | Boavista | 24 | (1) |
| 2005–2006 | Tenerife | 35 | (7) |
| 2006–2007 | Rijeka | 20 | (4) |
| 2007–2008 | União Leiria | 23 | (1) |
| 2008 | Ionikos | | |
| 2009 | AEK Larnaca | 4 | (1) |
| Total | | 297 | (43) |
- * Club domestic league appearances and goals

Antonio Jesús García González (born 24 February 1977), known as Toñito, is a Spanish former professional footballer who played mainly as an attacking midfielder.

He spent most of his 14-year career in Portugal where he represented five clubs (mainly Sporting CP), playing 206 games in the Primeira Liga and scoring 24 goals.

== Career ==
Toñito was born in La Orotava, Tenerife. A player with skill and teamwork approach alike, he started his senior career with hometown club CD Tenerife. Having made no appearances for the first team, he moved to Portugal ahead of the 1997–98 season and signed for Vitória de Setúbal, going on to represent in the country Sporting CP, C.D. Santa Clara – loaned, where he joined Mauricio Hanuch, also on loan– and Boavista FC.

Toñito played an important part as Sporting won the 1999–2000 national championship, their first in 18 years, making 27 appearances although 24 of those were as a substitute. On 7 October 2002, he provided the assist for Cristiano Ronaldo's first career goal, against Moreirense F.C. in the Primeira Liga (3–0 win).

In the 2005–06 campaign, Toñito returned to Spain and Tenerife, with the club now in the Segunda División, scoring seven league goals including two in a 3–2 away victory over Racing de Ferrol on 27 May 2006, before he was stretchered off. After a quick spell in Croatia with HNK Rijeka he returned to Portugal, netting a late equaliser for U.D. Leiria in a 1–1 draw at former side Sporting on 2 December 2007, although his team would eventually drop down a level.

For 2008–09, Toñito moved to Greece's Ionikos FC. However, in January 2009, he switched to the Cypriot First Division with AEK Larnaca FC, reuniting with his former Sporting teammate Elpídio Silva; he retired at the end of the season, aged 32.

== Post-retirement ==
Afterwards, Toñito opened a football academy in Santa Cruz de Tenerife called Sporting de Tenerife.

== Honours ==
Sporting CP

- Primeira Liga: 1999–2000
- Supertaça Cândido de Oliveira: 2000, 2002
