= Ismael Díaz (football manager) =

Spanish football manager

Personal information
- Full name: Ismael Jesús Díaz Galán
- Date of birth: 2 October 1965 (age 61)
- Place of birth: Avilés, Spain

Managerial career
- Years: Team
- 1995–1996: Ribadesella
- 1996–1997: Sporting B
- 1997–1998: Málaga
- 1998: Cádiz
- 2000: Farense
- 2000: Granada
- 2002: Huesca
- 2002–2004: Cacereño
- 2004–2005: Palencia
- 2007: Oviedo
- 2010–2011: Ribadesella
- 2012: FC Kairat (assistant)
- 2015: Avilés
- 2018: JS Hercules

Ismael Jesús Díaz Galán (born 2 October 1965), commonly known as Ismael Díaz, is a Spanish professional manager. He has spent most of his career in Spain managing lower and higher division clubs, such as Ribadesella CF, Sporting de Gijón B, Málaga CF, Cádiz CF, Granada CF, SD Huesca, CP Cacereño, CF Palencia and Real Oviedo; he also spent one season with Portuguese side S.C. Farense.

Later during his managerial career, Díaz also worked as an assistant to José Pérez Serer at FC Kairat of Kazakhstan.

== Managerial career ==
Díaz started his career at Spanish fourth tier club Ribadesella CF for a season, before moving to Sporting de Gijón's reserve team. In 1997, Díaz signed with Málaga CF, which at that time competed in the third division, Segunda División B. He guided the club to promotion to Segunda División after finishing the season as champions.

In summer 1998, Díaz joined Cádiz CF. His debut match was a 2–0 away win over Isla Cristina CD on 30 August 1998. However, despite this, he was sacked after only six games, having achieved two wins, one draw and three defeats – Díaz's other victory was a 2–1 away win over Granada CF in the return leg of the first round of the Copa del Rey.

After being absent from any managerial roles for approximately two years, Díaz moved to Portugal in 2000 to the newly promoted Primeira Liga side S.C. Farense. He managed to keep the club in the top division after defeating C.F. Os Belenenses at home with 2–1 on the final matchday to end in fourteenth place.

Later the same year in July, Díaz was appointed as the new manager of Granada CF. In 2002, Díaz was appointed as the new manager of SD Huesca. His first game was on 6 January 2002 against UE Figueres in the league which saw Huesca being defeated 1–2.

He then took over Cacereño, managing them for two seasons, before accepting the managerial role at CF Palencia in 2004. On 2 April 2007, Díaz was appointed as the new Real Oviedo manager. In July 2010, he returned to Ribadesella. On 6 June 2012, Díaz was announced as the assistant manager of FC Kairat of Kazakhstan under José Pérez Serer.

In March 2015, he was unveiled as the new manager of Real Avilés. He was fired after four games in charge.

Díaz was appointed as the manager of Finnish club JS Hercules on 6 April 2018. He left the club at the end of the season.

== Honours ==
Málaga CF

- Segunda División B: 1997–98
