= Pedro Barbosa =

Portuguese footballer

Personal information
- Full name: Pedro Alexandre dos Santos Barbosa
- Date of birth: 6 August 1970 (age 56)
- Place of birth: Gondomar, Portugal
- Height: 1.82 m (6 ft 0 in)
- Position: Attacking midfielder

Youth career
- 1983–1986: CA Rio Tinto
- 1986–1989: Porto

Senior career*
Years	Team	Apps	(Gls)
1989–1991	Freamunde	55	(13)
1991–1995	Vitória Guimarães	108	(20)
1995–2005	Sporting CP	259	(41)
Total		422	(74)

International career
1992–2002	Portugal	22	(5)
- * Club domestic league appearances and goals

Pedro Alexandre dos Santos Barbosa (born 6 August 1970; Portuguese pronunciation: [ˈpeðɾu βɐɾˈβɔzɐ]) is a Portuguese former professional footballer who played as an attacking midfielder.

Best known for his spell at Sporting CP, he appeared in 367 matches in the Primeira Liga and scored 61 goals, being a player with above-average skills.

Barbosa represented Portugal at the 2002 World Cup and Euro 1996.

== Club career ==
Born in Gondomar, Porto District, Barbosa unsuccessfully graduated from FC Porto's academy, making his professional debut with lowly S.C. Freamunde in the Segunda Liga.

He first came to prominence at Vitória de Guimarães, making his Primeira Liga debut at age 21, and joined Sporting CP in 1995–96, remaining at the club for the next ten seasons. Already a veteran, he contributed heavily to the Lisbon team's 2000 and 2002 league titles, appearing in respectively 31 (two goals scored) and 27 matches (three).

In the 2003–04 campaign, Barbosa netted a career-best nine goals to help his side to finish third. In the following, the 34-year-old played 13 matches as the Lions reached the UEFA Cup final on home soil, scoring all of his two goals against Middlesbrough in the round of 16.

Having made more than 300 competitive appearances for Sporting, Barbosa subsequently became its director of football. He left the post in early November 2009, after coach Paulo Bento's resignation.

== International career ==
Barbosa won 22 caps for the Portugal national team and scored five goals over ten years. He represented the nation at UEFA Euro 1996 (playing the last 30 minutes of the 3–0 group stage win against Croatia) and the 2002 FIFA World Cup (no appearances).

== Career statistics ==
Pedro Barbosa: International goals
No.	Date	Venue	Opponent	Score	Result	Competition
1	22 February 1995	Philips Stadion, Eindhoven, Netherlands	Netherlands	0–1	0–1	Friendly
2	20 August 1997	Estádio do Bonfim, Setúbal, Portugal	Armenia	3–1	3–1	1998 World Cup qualification
3	6 September 1997	Olympic Stadium (Berlin), Berlin, Germany	Germany	0–1	1–1	1998 World Cup qualification
4	6 June 2001	Estádio José Alvalade (1956), Lisbon, Portugal	Cyprus	2–0	6–0	2002 World Cup qualification
5	6 June 2001	Estádio José Alvalade (1956), Lisbon, Portugal	Cyprus	3–0	6–0	2002 World Cup qualification

== Honours ==
Sporting CP

- Primeira Liga: 1999–2000, 2001–02
- Taça de Portugal: 2001–02; runner-up: 1995–96, 1999–2000
- Supertaça Cândido de Oliveira: 1995, 2000, 2002
- UEFA Cup runner-up: 2004–05

Individual

- Primeira Liga Player of the Month: November 2003
