= Mauricio Hanuch =

Argentine footballer (1976–2020)

Personal information
- Full name: Mauricio Fabio Hanuch
- Date of birth: 16 November 1976
- Place of birth: Ciudad Evita, Argentina
- Date of death: 26 May 2020 (aged 43)
- Place of death: Buenos Aires, Argentina
- Height: 1.72 m (5 ft 8 in)
- Position: Midfielder

Senior career*
Years	Team	Apps	(Gls)
1993–1998	Platense	52	(9)
1995–1996	→ Deportivo Morón (loan)	21	(2)
1998–1999	Independiente	34	(3)
1999–2003	Sporting CP	12	(0)
2000–2001	→ Estudiantes LP (loan)	11	(0)
2001–2002	→ Santa Clara (loan)	9	(1)
2002–2003	→ Badajoz (loan)	0	(0)
2003–2004	Olimpo	26	(2)
2004	Talleres Córdoba	9	(1)
2005	Defensores Belgrano	11	(0)
2006	Rio Branco	3	(0)
2006–2007	Nueva Chicago	25	(0)
2008	Dinamo Tirana	4	(0)
2008–2009	Platense	20	(1)
Total		237	(19)
- * Club domestic league appearances and goals

Mauricio Fabio Hanuch (16 November 1976 – 26 May 2020) was an Argentine footballer who played as a midfielder.

He amassed Argentine Primera División totals of 137 games and 14 goals over the course of eight seasons, representing five clubs in the competition. He also played professionally in three other countries.

== Career ==
Born in Ciudad Evita, Greater Buenos Aires, Hanuch started playing professionally with Club Atlético Platense, joining Club Atlético Independiente after five years. He was then bought by Portugal's Sporting CP, where he was used during the first year, serving consecutive loans as early as the second season and being ultimately released in July 2003. In his only season with the "Lions", he totalled 418 minutes of action as the Lisbon side ended an 18-year drought and won the Primeira Liga championship.

Subsequently, Hanuch returned to Argentina, playing for Club Olimpo, Talleres de Córdoba, Defensores de Belgrano and Club Atlético Nueva Chicago, with a Brazilian spell (Rio Branco Esporte Clube) in between. After six months in Albania, he returned to his first club Platense for the 2008–09 campaign, retiring at the age of 32 and becoming a sports agent.

== Death ==
Hanuch died on 26 May 2020 aged 43 in Buenos Aires, due to stomach cancer. The previous decade he had been forced to undergo a kidney transplant, with the organ being donated by his sister.
