= Vitali Kutuzov =

Belarusian footballer (born 1980)

Personal information
- Full name: Vitali Vladimirovich Kutuzov
- Date of birth: 20 March 1980 (age 46)
- Place of birth: Pinsk, Soviet Union
- Height: 1.83 m (6 ft 0 in)
- Position: Striker

Youth career
- 1995–1997: RUOR Minsk

Senior career*
Years	Team	Apps	(Gls)
1996–1997	RUOR Minsk	52	(29)
1998–2001	BATE Borisov	99	(55)
2001–2004	Milan	2	(0)
2002–2003	→ Sporting CP (loan)	23	(3)
2003–2004	→ Avellino (loan)	42	(15)
2004–2006	Sampdoria	62	(7)
2006–2009	Parma	20	(0)
2007–2008	→ Pisa (loan)	37	(10)
2009–2012	Bari	51	(7)
Total		388	(126)

International career
1995	Belarus U16	3	(0)
1997–1998	Belarus U18	5	(0)
1998–2001	Belarus U21	24	(9)
2002–2011	Belarus	53	(13)
- * Club domestic league appearances and goals

Vitali Vladimirovich Kutuzov (Belarusian: Віталь Уладзіміравіч Кутузаў; born 20 March 1980) is a Belarusian former professional footballer who played as a striker.

== Club career ==
Kutuzov was born in Pinsk. He signed with BATE Borisov as an 18-year old in 1998, and established himself as a major player and top scorer for the team.

In 2001, Kutuzov joined the Serie A side AC Milan from BATE Borisov, becoming the club's third Russian-speaking player after Andriy Shevchenko and Kakha Kaladze. However, unlike his former USSR compatriots, he failed to establish himself as an important part of the team, getting to play only 37 minutes in four games throughout the entire season.

In 2002–03 football season, he was loaned out to Primeira Liga side Sporting CP. He played 30 games for them and scored 7 goals, including games in UEFA Cup and the domestic cup.

For the following, 2003–04 season he was again loaned, this time to the Italian Serie B side Avellino. Kutuzov established himself as one of the most important players of the side and a fan-favorite. He played 43 games, scoring 15 goals. Despite his efforts, the team was relegated to Serie C1.

After his successful season in Serie B, he was noticed by the Serie A side U.C. Sampdoria. The club bought half of the rights for the footballer from A.C. Milan in 2004 for €1.5 million and signed him until 2008. In the 2004–05 season he played in 32 games (14 times in starting line-up, totaling 1,604 minutes) and scored 4 goals.

On 20 June 2006, F.C. Parma bought the full rights on Kutuzov from Sampdoria (and in earlier Sampdoria bought Milan's half for €1 million). He signed a three-year contract with them. He was loaned to newly promoted Serie B side Pisa in July 2007. He returned to Parma during the summer of 2008.

In January 2009, he left for A.S. Bari where he finished his career.

== International career ==
Kutuzov earned over 50 caps for the Belarus national team. On 17 April 2002, he made his debut, contributing two goals in a 5–2 away win over Hungary in a friendly.

== Career statistics ==
Scores and results list Belarus' goal tally first, score column indicates score after each Kutuzov goal.

List of international goals scored by Vitali Kutuzov
No.	Date	Venue	Opponent	Score	Result	Competition
1	17 April 2002	Stadion Oláh Gábor Út, Debrecen, Hungary	Hungary	2–1	5–2	Friendly
2	17 April 2002	Stadion Oláh Gábor Út, Debrecen, Hungary	Hungary	3–1	5–2	Friendly
3	21 August 2002	Skonto Stadium, Riga, Latvia	Latvia	1–0	4–2	Friendly
4	29 March 2003	Dinamo Stadium, Minsk, Belarus	Moldova	1–1	2–1	UEFA Euro 2004 qualifying
5	30 April 2003	Pakhtakor Markaziy Stadium, Tashkent, Uzbekistan	Uzbekistan	2–1	2–1	Friendly
6	8 September 2004	Ullevaal Stadion, Oslo, Norway	Norway	1–1	1–1	2006 FIFA World Cup qualification
7	9 October 2004	Dinamo Stadium, Minsk, Belarus	Moldova	2–0	4–0	2006 FIFA World Cup qualification
8	7 September 2005	Dinamo Stadium, Minsk, Belarus	Italy	1–0	1–4	2006 FIFA World Cup qualification
9	8 October 2005	Hampden Park, Glasgow, Scotland	Scotland	1–0	1–0	2006 FIFA World Cup qualification
10	24 March 2007	Stade Josy Barthel, Luxembourg City, Luxembourg	Luxembourg	2–0	2–1	UEFA Euro 2008 qualifying
11	17 November 2007	Qemal Stafa Stadium, Tirana, Albania	Albania	2–2	4–2	UEFA Euro 2008 qualifying
12	17 November 2007	Qemal Stafa Stadium, Tirana, Albania	Albania	3–2	4–2	UEFA Euro 2008 qualifying
13	26 March 2008	Dinamo Stadium, Minsk, Belarus	Turkey	1–0	2–2	Friendly

== Honours ==
BATE Borisov

- Belarusian Premier League: 1999

Sporting CP

- Supertaça Cândido de Oliveira: 2002
