= Augusto Inácio =

Portuguese football manager and former player (born 1955)

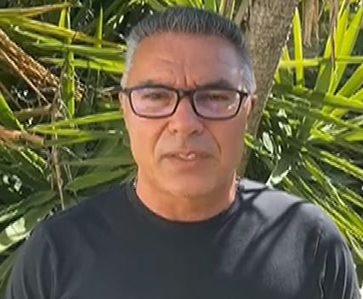
- Inácio in 2020

Personal information
- Full name: Augusto Soares Inácio
- Date of birth: 30 January 1955 (age 71)
- Place of birth: Lisbon, Portugal
- Height: 1.79 m (5 ft 10 1/2 in)
- Position: Left back

Youth career
- Sporting CP

Senior career*
Years	Team	Apps	(Gls)
1974–1982	Sporting CP	157	(5)
1982–1989	Porto	142	(4)
Total		299	(9)

International career
1976–1986	Portugal	25	(0)

Managerial career
- 1990–1991: Rio Ave
- 1994–1996: Porto (assistant)
- 1995: Porto (interim)
- 1996: Marítimo
- 1996–1997: Felgueiras
- 1997–1999: Marítimo
- 1999: Chaves
- 1999–2001: Sporting CP
- 2001–2003: Vitória Guimarães
- 2004: Belenenses
- 2004: Al-Ahli
- 2005–2006: Beira-Mar
- 2006–2007: Ionikos
- 2007–2008: Foolad
- 2008–2009: Interclube
- 2009–2010: Naval
- 2010–2011: Leixões
- 2012: Vaslui
- 2013: Moreirense
- 2016–2017: Moreirense
- 2017: Zamalek
- 2019: Aves
- 2020: Avaí
- * Club domestic league appearances and goals

Augusto Soares Inácio (born 30 January 1955) is a Portuguese retired footballer who played as a left back, and a manager.

Having represented both Sporting and Porto as a professional player, he went on to have a lengthy managerial career that would last more than 30 years in eight countries including his own (in this capacity, he also worked with both clubs).

A Portugal international for one full decade, Inácio represented the country at the 1986 World Cup.

== Playing career ==
Born in Lisbon, Inácio started playing for Sporting CP, signing at the age of 27 for Porto and winning several Primeira Liga championships and domestic cups with both clubs. With the latter, he started in both European competition finals played in the 80s, the 1–2 against Juventus in the 1983–84 European Cup Winners' Cup and the 1986–87 European Cup, won at the expense of Bayern Munich.

Inácio earned 25 caps for Portugal, mainly for Porto. His debut came on 5 December 1976 in a 2–1 win over Cyprus in the 1978 FIFA World Cup qualifiers, and he represented the nation at UEFA Euro 1984 and the 1986 World Cup, playing his last international in the latter, a 1–3 group stage loss to Morocco on 11 July.

== Coaching career ==
After ending his career, Inácio became a manager. One of his first stops was at former side Porto as part of the Bobby Robson-led coaching staff, helping the northerners to back-to-back league conquests; his first head coach assignment arrived with another former club, as he led Sporting to its first title in 18 years, in 1999–2000; subsequently, he managed Chaves, Marítimo, Vitória Guimarães and Beira-Mar.

In the 2005–06 season, the Aveiro team won the second level, thus achieving promotion. However, Inácio would be sacked just nine matches into the following campaign, leaving them with only six points; he then went on to manage Ionikos in the Super League Greece, but resigned on 15 January 2007 after a heavy defeat against Panathinaikos.

Inácio moved to Iran just ten days later with Foolad, signing until June. Despite suffering relegation to the second division he signed a contract extension for the next season; in May 2008, he took the reins of Interclube in Luanda, Angola.

Inácio was sacked in the summer of 2009 and, on 13 September, he reached an agreement with Associação Naval for a return to Portugal, in a one-year deal. At this time in the season, Naval had just one point from four games and dismissed Ulisses Morais, but ultimately easily retained their top division status, finishing in eighth position.

In late January 2012, Inácio signed a contract with Romanian Liga I team Vaslui. After three months at the helm of Moreirense late into the 2012–13 campaign (four wins in 14 matches, team relegation), he returned to Sporting as director of football; in June 2015, still with the latter club, he was appointed director of international relations.

Inácio returned to head coaching duties in late November 2016, when he replaced fired Pepa at the helm of former side Moreirense. The following month he led the team to their first ever major trophy, conquering the Taça da Liga after the 1–0 win over Braga at the Estádio Algarve; previously, they disposed of Porto in the group stage of the competition and Benfica in the semi-finals.

Inácio was however fired on 20 March 2017, due to a poor string of league results. On 7 April, he succeeded Mohamed Helmy at the helm of Egyptian Premier League side Zamalek; he terminated his one-and-a-half-year contract in late July, being subsequently held in the club's facilities and requesting help from the Portuguese embassy in the African country until the situation was eventually solved.

On 16 January 2019, Inácio was appointed at Aves. He was relieved of his duties seven months later, after only collecting one league win in eight matches and being ousted from the Taça de Portugal by Farense (5–2 loss).

Inácio became manager of Avaí at the Campeonato Brasileiro Série B on 18 December 2019. The following February, after four losses in seven games, he was dismissed.

== Honours ==
=== Player ===
Sporting

- Primeira Liga: 1979–80, 1981–82
- Taça de Portugal: 1977–78, 1981–82

Porto

- Primeira Liga: 1984–85, 1985–86, 1987–88
- Taça de Portugal: 1983–84, 1987–88
- Supertaça Cândido de Oliveira: 1984, 1985, 1987
- UEFA Champions League: 1986–87
- UEFA Super Cup: 1987
- Intercontinental Cup: 1987
- UEFA Cup Winners' Cup runner-up: 1983–84

=== Manager ===
Sporting

- Primeira Liga: 1999–2000

Beira-Mar

- Segunda Liga: 2005–06

Moreirense

- Taça da Liga: 2016–17
