= 1999–2000 Primeira Liga =

66th season of top-tier Portuguese football

Primeira Liga
- Season: 1999–2000
- Dates: 20 August 1999 – 14 May 2000
- Champions: Sporting CP; 17th title
- Relegated: Vitória de Setúbal; Rio Ave; Santa Clara
- UEFA Champions League: Sporting CP (first group stage); Porto (third qualifying round)
- UEFA Cup: Benfica (first round); Boavista (qualifying round)
- Matches: 306
- Goals: 739 (2.42 per match)
- Top goalscorer: Mário Jardel (37 goals)
- Biggest home win: Porto 5–0 Farense (20 December 1999)
- Biggest away win: Rio Ave 0–5 Santa Clara (26 September 1999)
- Highest scoring: Benfica 6–2 Farense (20 February 2000)
- Longest winning run: 4 games Boavista; Sporting CP
- Longest unbeaten run: 12 games Sporting CP
- Longest winless run: 8 games Rio Ave; Vitória de Guimarães
- Longest losing run: 5 games Campomaiorense

The 1999–2000 Primeira Liga was the 66th season of top-tier football in Portugal. The competition was renamed Campeonato Nacional da Primeira Liga (National Championship of the First League), Primeira Liga for short, after the Portuguese League for Professional Football took control of the two top nationwide leagues in 1999. It started on 20 August 1999 and ended on 14 May 2000. The league was contested by 18 clubs with Porto as the defending champions.

Sporting won their first Championship in 18 years (since 1981–82) and qualified for the 2000–01 UEFA Champions League first group stage, along with Porto, who qualified for the third qualifying round. Benfica, Boavista, qualified for the UEFA Cup; in opposite, Vitória de Setúbal, Rio Ave and Santa Clara were relegated to the Segunda Liga. Mário Jardel was the top scorer with 37 goals.

== Promotion and relegation ==
=== Teams relegated to Segunda Liga ===
- Beira-Mar
- Chaves
- Académica

Beira-Mar, Chaves and Académica, were consigned to the Liga de Honra following their final classification in 1998–99 season.

=== Teams promoted from Liga de Honra ===
- Gil Vicente
- Belenenses
- Santa Clara

The other three teams were replaced by Gil Vicente, Belenenses and Santa Clara from the Liga de Honra.

== Teams ==
Location of teams in the 1999–2000 Primeira Liga
Location of teams in Madeira in the 1999–2000 Primeira Liga
Location of teams in Azores in the 1999–2000 Primeira Liga

=== Personnel and kits ===
Team	Manager	Captain	Kit manufacturer	Shirt sponsor
Alverca	(Portugal) António Veloso	(Portugal) Hugo Costa	Saillev	Somague
Belenenses	(Portugal) Vítor Oliveira	(Angola) Wilson	Umbro	Montepio Geral
Benfica	(Germany) Jupp Heynckes	(Portugal) João Pinto	Adidas	Telecel
Boavista	(Portugal) Jaime Pacheco	(Portugal) Paulo Sousa	Diadora	Montepio Geral
Braga	(Portugal) Manuel Cajuda	(Portugal) José Barroso	Umbro	Recheio
Campomaiorense	(Portugal) Carlos Manuel	(Portugal) Paulo Sérgio	Reebok	Delta Cafés
Estrela da Amadora	(Portugal) Jorge Jesus	(Portugal) Joaquim Rebelo	Lotto	Gelpeixe
Farense	(Spain) Ismael Díaz	(Morocco) Hajry Redouane	Saillev	Pingo Doce
Gil Vicente	(Portugal) Álvaro Magalhães	(Portugal) Jorge Casquilha	Patrick	Grupo FM Magalhães
Leiria	(Portugal) Manuel José	(Portugal) Luís Bilro	Sporito	Armazéns Madiver
Marítimo	(Portugal) Nelo Vingada	(Portugal) Carlos Jorge	Saillev	Hiper Sá
Porto	(Portugal) Fernando Santos	(Portugal) Jorge Costa	Kappa	Revigrés
Rio Ave	(Portugal) Carlos Brito	(Portugal) Augusto Gama	Fila	Vila do Conde
Salgueiros	(Portugal) Vítor Manuel	(Portugal) Jorge Silva	Umbro	Nuelmos
Santa Clara	(Portugal) Manuel Fernandes	(Angola) Paulo Figueiredo	Umbro	Sol-Mar
Sporting CP	(Portugal) Augusto Inácio	(Portugal) Pedro Barbosa	Reebok	Telecel
Vitória de Guimarães	(Portugal) António Valença	(Portugal) Fernando Meira	Adidas	Bayer Milraz
Vitória de Setúbal	(Portugal) Rui Águas	(Portugal) Hélio Sousa	Saillev	None

=== Managerial changes ===
Team	Outgoing manager	Manner of departure	Date of vacancy	Position in table	Incoming manager	Date of appointment
Sporting CP	(Croatia) Mirko Jozić	Resigned	7 June 1999	Pre-season	(Italy) Giuseppe Materazzi	16 June 1999
Sporting CP	(Italy) Giuseppe Materazzi	Sacked	27 September 1999	4th	(Portugal) Augusto Inácio	4 October 1999
Salgueiros	(Portugal) Dito		7 November 1999	13th	(Portugal) Vítor Manuel	10 November 1999
Farense	(Portugal) João Alves		5 December 1999	16th	(Portugal) Nicolau Vaqueiro	12 December 1999
Farense	(Portugal) Nicolau Vaqueiro		8 January 2000	16th	(Portugal) Jorge Portela	16 January 2000
Vitória de Setúbal	(Portugal) Carlos Cardoso		8 January 2000	17th	(Portugal) Rui Águas	16 January 2000
Farense	(Portugal) Jorge Portela		29 January 2000	15th	(Spain) Ismael Díaz	6 February 2000
Vitória de Guimarães	(Portugal) Quinito		24 April 2000	6th	(Portugal) António Valença	30 April 2000

== League table ==
Pos	Team	Pld	W	D	L	GF	GA	GD	Pts	Qualification or relegation
1	Sporting CP (C)	34	23	8	3	57	22	+35	77	Qualification to Champions League group stage
2	Porto	34	22	7	5	66	26	+40	73	Qualification to Champions League third qualifying round
3	Benfica	34	21	6	7	58	33	+25	69	Qualification to UEFA Cup first round
4	Boavista	34	16	7	11	40	31	+9	55	Qualification to UEFA Cup qualifying round
5	Gil Vicente	34	14	11	9	48	34	+14	53	
6	Marítimo	34	13	11	10	42	36	+6	50	
7	Vitória de Guimarães	34	14	6	14	48	43	+5	48	
8	Estrela da Amadora	34	10	15	9	40	35	+5	45	
9	Braga	34	12	7	15	44	45	−1	43	
10	Leiria	34	10	12	12	31	35	−4	42	
11	Alverca	34	11	8	15	39	48	−9	41	
12	Belenenses	34	9	13	12	36	38	−2	40	
13	Campomaiorense	34	10	6	18	31	51	−20	36	
14	Farense	34	8	11	15	35	60	−25	35	
15	Salgueiros	34	9	7	18	30	49	−19	34	
16	Vitória de Setúbal (R)	34	9	6	19	25	49	−24	33 (Note: Vitória de Setúbal: 4 points)	Relegation to Segunda Liga
17	Rio Ave (R)	34	8	9	17	34	54	−20	33 (Note: Rio Ave: 1 point)	Relegation to Segunda Liga
18	Santa Clara (R)	34	7	10	17	35	50	−15	31	Relegation to Segunda Liga

Source: Infordesporto
Rules for classification: 1) points; 2) head-to-head points; 3) head-to-head goal difference; 4) goal difference; 5) number of goals scored
(C) Champions; (R) Relegated

== Results ==
Home \ Away	ALV	BEL	BEN	BOA	BRA	CPM	EST	FAR	GVI	MAR	POR	RAV	SAL	STC	SCP	ULE	VGU	VSE
Alverca		1–1	3–1	1–0	3–2	1–0	0–1	0–1	4–2	1–1	1–1	3–1	2–0	0–1	2–1	0–0	2–1	0–1
Belenenses	4–2		0–0	1–1	0–3	2–2	1–1	1–1	1–1	1–1	0–0	2–1	2–1	3–1	0–1	1–0	2–0	0–1
Benfica	3–2	2–3		1–1	2–1	2–0	2–0	6–2	3–0	2–1	1–0	1–0	1–0	1–0	0–0	3–2	3–0	3–0
Boavista	2–0	1–0	1–1		2–2	2–1	1–2	2–1	2–0	0–2	1–1	2–0	2–1	2–1	0–1	0–1	2–0	1–0
Braga	3–1	0–0	3–2	1–0		4–1	0–1	1–0	0–0	1–2	0–1	0–1	2–0	3–1	0–2	0–2	2–4	3–0
Campomaiorense	0–0	2–1	2–4	0–1	2–4		2–1	1–0	0–0	1–0	1–0	1–1	0–1	1–0	0–2	2–0	2–1	0–1
Estrela da Amadora	3–0	0–3	3–0	1–2	3–3	3–0		1–1	0–1	1–1	0–2	1–0	1–0	0–0	0–0	1–1	2–2	3–0
Farense	1–2	2–1	0–1	0–2	1–1	2–2	1–1		0–3	1–0	3–3	4–0	3–2	2–2	0–3	2–1	2–1	0–0
Gil Vicente	2–2	1–1	0–2	1–3	0–0	3–0	2–2	4–0		5–1	2–1	4–0	2–0	3–1	1–1	2–0	1–0	2–0
Marítimo	3–0	0–0	0–0	1–1	1–0	1–0	2–2	3–0	1–0		2–1	5–2	0–1	0–0	0–2	0–0	1–1	1–0
Porto	0–0	2–1	2–0	1–0	3–0	2–0	2–1	5–0	2–0	3–2		4–1	2–0	1–0	3–0	4–2	2–1	4–1
Rio Ave	2–0	3–0	1–1	2–1	2–0	1–0	0–1	1–1	3–1	0–2	2–2		4–1	0–5	1–2	0–0	1–1	1–1
Salgueiros	0–2	0–0	1–2	1–3	1–1	2–1	1–1	0–0	1–2	1–0	0–4	1–1		2–0	0–4	3–0	0–1	1–0
Santa Clara	4–3	1–0	0–3	0–1	1–2	2–2	1–1	1–2	0–0	0–0	0–2	1–0	0–0		2–2	1–1	3–2	2–1
Sporting CP	1–1	1–0	0–1	2–0	2–0	1–0	1–1	3–1	1–1	4–2	2–0	2–1	2–0	4–1		2–0	1–0	2–1
União de Leiria	3–0	1–0	2–1	0–0	3–0	1–2	1–1	2–0	1–1	0–1	0–1	0–0	1–4	3–2	1–1		1–0	0–0
Vitória de Guimarães	1–0	4–2	2–1	2–0	1–0	4–1	1–0	3–0	1–0	1–3	1–1	2–1	2–2	2–1	1–2	0–1		4–0
Vitória de Setúbal	1–0	0–2	1–2	2–1	0–2	1–2	1–0	1–1	0–1	4–2	1–4	2–0	1–2	1–0	1–2	0–0	1–1	

Source: Foradejogo (in Portuguese)
Legend: Blue = home team win; Yellow = draw; Red = away team win.

== Top goalscorers ==
Rank	Player	Club	Goals
1	(Brazil) Mário Jardel	Porto	37
2	(Argentina) Alberto Acosta	Sporting CP	22
3	(Brazil) Gaúcho	Estrela da Amadora	21
4	(Portugal) Nuno Gomes	Benfica	18
5	(Brazil) Brandão	Vitória de Guimarães	16
6	(Argentina) Mariano Toedtli	Marítimo	13
7	(Brazil) Hugo Henrique	Rio Ave	12
8	(Romania) Lucian Marinescu	Farense	11
8	(Brazil) Whelliton	Boavista	11
10	(Brazil) Edmilson	Vitória de Guimarães	10
10	(Portugal) Maniche	Benfica	10
10	(Brazil) Odair	Braga	10

== Attendances ==
#	Club	Average
1	Sporting	28,824
2	Benfica	27,706
3	Porto	22,029
4	Vitória SC	8,635
5	Braga	8,059
6	Marítimo	7,412
7	Boavista	7,235
8	Santa Clara	5,588
9	União de Leiria	5,235
10	Vitória FC	5,235
11	Rio Ave	4,941
12	Farense	4,000
13	Os Belenenses	3,941
14	Campomaiorense	3,794
15	Salgueiros	3,706
16	Gil Vicente	3,500
17	Estrela da Amadora	3,235
18	Alverca	2,394
