= 2001–02 Primeira Liga =

68th season of top-tier Portuguese football

Primeira Liga
- Season: 2001–02
- Dates: 10 August 2001 – 5 May 2002
- Champions: Sporting CP; 18th title
- Relegated: Salgueiros; Farense; Alverca
- Champions League: Sporting CP (third qualifying round); Boavista (second qualifying round)
- UEFA Cup: Porto (first round); Leixões (first round)
- Intertoto Cup: Belenenses (second round); União de Leiria (first round); Santa Clara (first round)
- Matches: 306
- Goals: 818 (2.67 per match)
- Top goalscorer: Mário Jardel (42 goals)
- Biggest home win: União de Leiria 7–0 Salgueiros (9 December 2001)
- Biggest away win: Paços de Ferreira 0–6 Sporting CP (27 October 2001)
- Highest scoring: 5–3 (2 times); 6-2 (1 time)

The 2001–02 Primeira Liga was the 68th edition of top flight of Portuguese football. It started on 11 August 2001 with a match between Varzim and Benfica, and ended on 6 May 2002. The league was contested by 18 clubs with Boavista as the defending champions.

Sporting CP won the league and qualified for the 2002–03 UEFA Champions League third qualifying round, along with Boavista, who qualified for the second round. Porto, Benfica and Leixões from the third division qualified for the 2002–03 UEFA Cup, while Salgueiros, Farense and Alverca were relegated to the Segunda Liga. Mário Jardel was the top scorer with 42 goals. Until 2021, this remained the last season where Sporting CP won the title and where neither Porto nor Benfica won before Sporting CP won the 2020–21 season ending their 19-year drought and the 19-year reign of Porto and Benfica.

== Promotion and relegation ==
=== Teams relegated to Segunda Liga ===
- Campomaiorense
- Desportivo das Aves
- Estrela da Amadora

Campomaiorense, Desportivo das Aves and Estrela da Amadora were consigned to the Segunda Liga following their final classification in the 2000–01 season.

=== Teams promoted from Segunda Liga ===
- Santa Clara
- Varzim
- Vitória de Setúbal

The other three teams were replaced by Santa Clara, Varzim and Vitória de Setúbal from the Segunda Liga.

== Teams ==
=== Stadia and locations ===
Location of teams in Primeira Liga 2001-02 (Mainland)
Location of teams in Madeira 2001-2002 Liga
Location of teams in Azores 2001-2002 Liga

Team	Head coach	City	Stadium	2000–01 finish
Alverca	(Portugal) Carlos Pereira	Alverca	Complexo do Alverca	12th
Beira-Mar	(Portugal) António Sousa	Aveiro	Estádio Mário Duarte	8th
Belenenses	(Brazil) Marinho Peres	Lisbon	Estádio do Restelo	7th
Benfica	(Portugal) Toni	Lisbon	Estádio da Luz	6th
Boavista	(Portugal) Jaime Pacheco	Porto	Estádio do Bessa	1st
Braga	(Portugal) Manuel Cajuda	Braga	Estádio Primeiro de Maio	4th
Farense	(Spain) Alberto Pazos	Faro	Estádio de São Luís	13th
Marítimo	(Portugal) Nelo Vingada	Funchal	Estádio dos Barreiros	11th
Paços de Ferreira	(Portugal) José Mota	Paços de Ferreira	Estádio da Mata Real	9th
Porto	(Portugal) Octávio Machado	Porto	Estádio das Antas	2nd
Salgueiros	(Portugal) Vítor Manuel	Porto	Estádio Engenheiro Vidal Pinheiro	10th
Santa Clara	(Portugal) Carlos Manuel	Ponta Delgada	Estádio de São Miguel	1st in Segunda Liga
Sporting CP	(Romania) László Bölöni	Lisbon	Estádio José Alvalade	3rd
União de Leiria	(Portugal) José Mourinho	Leiria	Estádio Dr. Magalhães Pessoa	5th
Varzim	(Portugal) Rogério Gonçalves	Póvoa de Varzim	Estádio do Varzim Sport Club	2nd in Segunda Liga
Vitória de Guimarães	(Brazil) Augusto Inácio	Guimarães	Estádio D. Afonso Henriques	15th
Vitória de Setúbal	(Portugal) Jorge Jesus	Setúbal	Estádio do Bonfim	3rd in Segunda Liga

=== Managerial changes ===
Team	Outgoing manager	Date of vacancy	Position in table	Incoming manager	Date of appointment
Santa Clara	(Portugal) Carlos Manuel	30 September 2001	15th	(Portugal) Manuel Fernandes	1 October 2001
Salgueiros	(Portugal) Vítor Manuel	5 November 2001	16th	(Portugal) Carlos Manuel	6 November 2001
Farense	(Spain) Alberto Pazos	25 November 2001	13th	(Portugal) Jorge Castelo	26 November 2001
Varzim	(Portugal) Rogério Gonçalves	25 November 2001	18th	(Portugal) José Alberto Costa	26 November 2001
Benfica	(Portugal) Toni	23 December 2001	4th	(Portugal) Jesualdo Ferreira	28 December 2001
Alverca	(Portugal) Carlos Pereira	8 January 2002	16th	(Portugal) Vítor Manuel	9 January 2002
União de Leiria	(Portugal) José Mourinho	20 January 2002	4th	(Portugal) Mário Reis	21 January 2002
Porto	(Portugal) Octávio Machado	20 January 2002	5th	(Portugal) José Mourinho	21 January 2002
Vitória de Setúbal	(Portugal) Jorge Jesus	20 January 2002	17th	(Portugal) Luís Campos	21 January 2002
Farense	(Portugal) Jorge Castelo	23 February 2002	16th	(Spain) Paco Fortes	24 February 2002
União de Leiria	(Portugal) Mário Reis	24 February 2002	4th	(Portugal) Vítor Pontes	25 February 2002

== League table ==
Pos	Team	Pld	W	D	L	GF	GA	GD	Pts	Qualification or relegation
1	Sporting CP (C)	34	22	9	3	74	25	+49	75	Qualification to Champions League third qualifying round
2	Boavista	34	21	7	6	53	20	+33	70	Qualification to Champions League second qualifying round
3	Porto	34	21	5	8	66	34	+32	68	Qualification to UEFA Cup first round
4	Benfica	34	17	12	5	66	37	+29	63	
5	Belenenses	34	17	6	11	54	44	+10	57	Qualification to Intertoto Cup second round
6	Marítimo	34	17	5	12	48	35	+13	56	
7	União de Leiria	34	15	10	9	52	35	+17	55	Qualification to Intertoto Cup first round
8	Paços de Ferreira	34	12	10	12	41	44	−3	46	
9	Vitória de Guimarães	34	11	9	14	35	41	−6	42	
10	Braga	34	10	12	12	43	43	0	42	
11	Beira-Mar	34	10	9	15	48	56	−8	39	
12	Gil Vicente	34	10	8	16	42	56	−14	38	
13	Vitória de Setúbal	34	9	11	14	40	46	−6	38	
14	Santa Clara	34	9	10	15	32	46	−14	37	Qualification to Intertoto Cup first round
15	Varzim	34	8	8	18	27	55	−28	32	
16	Salgueiros (R)	34	8	6	20	29	71	−42	30	Relegation to Segunda Liga
17	Farense (R)	34	7	7	20	29	63	−34	28	Relegation to Segunda Liga
18	Alverca (R)	34	7	6	21	39	67	−28	27	Relegation to Segunda Liga

Source: Primeira Divisão
Rules for classification: 1) points; 2) head-to-head points; 3) head-to-head goal difference; 4) goal difference; 5) number of goals scored
(C) Champions; (R) Relegated

== Results ==
Home \ Away	ALV	BEM	BEL	BEN	BOA	BRA	FAR	GVI	MAR	PAÇ	POR	SAL	STC	SCP	ULE	VAR	VGU	VSE
Alverca		2–0	0–1	1–3	1–2	0–3	1–0	1–4	0–2	1–0	0–1	1–2	3–1	1–3	1–1	4–2	3–2	1–1
Beira-Mar	6–2		0–3	3–3	0–3	4–2	2–1	2–2	2–0	0–2	2–0	1–1	0–1	1–2	2–1	4–0	0–0	1–0
Belenenses	1–1	1–5		1–1	0–2	1–1	4–0	1–0	0–1	1–2	3–0	1–0	1–1	3–0	1–0	3–2	2–1	1–1
Benfica	3–2	4–1	2–1		2–1	1–1	5–0	2–0	1–1	4–0	0–0	2–0	2–1	2–2	0–2	3–2	0–0	3–2
Boavista	2–0	3–0	2–0	1–0		3–0	1–1	0–0	0–1	5–0	2–0	2–1	2–0	0–0	1–0	1–2	0–0	4–1
Braga	5–3	3–2	2–3	0–1	0–2		4–0	1–0	1–0	1–0	0–4	0–0	6–0	2–1	0–0	2–0	0–0	1–1
Farense	2–1	1–0	2–2	0–2	1–2	2–2		3–2	2–1	1–1	0–3	2–1	1–0	1–3	0–1	1–1	0–1	2–2
Gil Vicente	2–2	2–1	3–2	0–2	0–3	2–1	3–1		1–1	1–1	2–5	3–2	1–3	1–1	0–0	1–0	2–1	2–1
Marítimo	5–0	3–1	0–2	3–2	0–0	4–1	1–0	2–1		0–1	1–3	4–0	1–0	0–2	3–0	1–1	2–0	3–1
Paços de Ferreira	2–2	0–0	3–1	2–1	0–1	0–0	1–1	2–0	2–1		1–2	6–0	2–1	0–6	1–2	0–0	0–0	1–0
Porto	0–0	2–3	1–2	3–2	4–1	0–0	2–0	2–1	2–1	1–0		3–0	5–3	2–2	2–1	3–0	3–0	3–0
Salgueiros	2–1	1–1	1–2	1–4	1–1	1–0	0–2	3–0	2–1	3–2	0–3		2–1	1–5	0–1	2–1	1–3	0–2
Santa Clara	2–1	0–0	2–3	0–0	0–2	1–0	2–0	0–0	0–0	1–1	2–1	1–1		0–3	1–1	1–0	2–0	1–0
Sporting CP	0–1	2–1	2–0	1–1	2–0	2–2	1–0	3–1	4–0	3–0	1–0	2–0	0–0		4–1	4–0	5–0	1–0
União de Leiria	2–1	4–1	3–0	1–1	0–1	3–1	4–1	2–1	2–0	2–1	1–1	7–0	2–2	1–1		0–1	2–1	0–0
Varzim	1–0	1–1	1–5	2–2	0–2	0–0	2–0	2–0	0–1	0–3	0–1	0–0	1–0	1–3	2–0		0–0	2–1
Vitória de Guimarães	2–0	0–0	2–1	1–4	2–0	2–1	3–1	0–2	1–3	1–1	2–0	3–0	1–0	0–1	2–4	4–0		0–0
Vitória de Setúbal	2–1	4–1	0–1	1–1	1–1	0–0	2–0	3–2	0–1	1–3	1–4	3–0	3–2	2–2	1–1	2–0	1–0	

Source: Foradejogo (in Portuguese)
Legend: Blue = home team win; Yellow = draw; Red = away team win.

== Top goalscorers ==
Rank	Player	Club	Goals
1	(Brazil) Mário Jardel	Sporting CP	42
2	(Brazil) Derlei	União de Leiria	21
3	(Senegal) Fary Faye	Beira-Mar	18
4	(Brazil) Hugo Henrique	Vitória de Setúbal	16
5	(Brazil) Gaúcho	Marítimo	15
5	(Brazil) Barata	Braga	15
7	(Brazil) Leonardo	Paços de Ferreira	14
8	(Brazil) Deco	Porto	13
8	(Angola) Mantorras	Benfica	13
10	(South Africa) Benni McCarthy	Porto	12
10	(Portugal) João Pedro	Salgueiros	12

== Attendances ==
#	Club	Average
1	Benfica	29,924
2	Sporting	25,660
3	Porto	21,159
4	Vitória SC	8,138
5	Boavista	7,500
6	Santa Clara	7,000
7	Braga	6,086
8	Vitória FC	5,147
9	Marítimo	4,559
10	Varzim	4,441
11	Farense	4,012
12	Beira-Mar	3,882
13	Paços de Ferreira	3,529
14	Os Belenenses	3,265
15	Salgueiros	3,088
16	União de Leiria	2,971
17	Alverca	2,729
18	Gil Vicente	2,677
