= 1995 Taça de Portugal final =

- Event: 1994–95 Taça de Portugal
| Marítimo | Sporting CP |
| 0 | 2 |
- Date: 10 June 1995
- Venue: Estádio Nacional, Oeiras
- Man of the Match: Ivaylo Yordanov (Sporting CP)
- Referee: Bento Marques (Lisbon)

The 1995 Taça de Portugal final was the final match of the 1994–95 Taça de Portugal, the 55th season of the Taça de Portugal, the premier Portuguese football cup competition organized by the Portuguese Football Federation (FPF). It was played on 10 June 1995 at the Estádio Nacional in Oeiras, and opposed two Primeira Liga sides: Marítimo and Sporting CP. Sporting CP defeated Marítimo 2–0 to claim the Taça de Portugal for a twelfth time.

In Portugal, it was televised live on RTP. As a result of Sporting CP winning the Taça de Portugal, the Leões qualified for the 1995 Supertaça Cândido de Oliveira where they took on 1994–95 Primeira Divisão winners Porto.

== Match ==
=== Details ===
10 June 1995
17:00 CEST

| Marítimo | 0–2 | Sporting CP |
|---|---|---|
| | | Yordanov 10', 86' |

Estádio Nacional, Oeiras
Referee: Bento Marques (Lisbon)

| Marítimo | Sporting CP |

| GK | 1 | (Brazil) Everton |
| RB | 6 | (Brazil) Humberto |
| CB | 2 | (Brazil) Heitor | | (substituted off) 72' |
| CB | 3 | (Brazil) Robson | | (substituted off) 57' |
| LB | 4 | (Portugal) Carlos Jorge (c) |
| DM | 5 | (Portugal) Soeiro |
| CM | 8 | (Portugal) Zeca |
| CM | 7 | (Brazil) Luís Gustavo |
| AM | 10 | (Brazil) Edmilson |
| CF | 11 | (Portugal) Paulo Alves | (yellow card) 11' |
| CF | 9 | (Canada) Alex Bunbury |
Substitutes:
| GK | 12 | (Portugal) José Bizarro | (red card) 82' |
| DF | 13 | (Portugal) João Luís |
| MF | 14 | (Portugal) José Pedro | | (substituted on) 72' |
| MF | 15 | (Portugal) Vado | | (substituted on) 57' |
| FW | 16 | (Portugal) António Rebelo |
Manager:
(Brazil) Paulo Autuori

| GK | 1 | (Portugal) Costinha | | (substituted off) 87' |
| RB | 2 | (Portugal) Fernando Nélson |
| CB | 6 | (Morocco) Noureddine Naybet |
| CB | 3 | (Brazil) Marco Aurélio |
| LB | 5 | (Federal Republic of Yugoslavia) Budimir Vujačić | (yellow card) 50' |
| RM | 7 | (Portugal) Luís Figo | (yellow card) 42' |
| CM | 4 | (Portugal) Oceano (c) | (yellow card) 71' |
| CM | 8 | (Portugal) Carlos Xavier | (yellow card) 52' | (substituted off) 75' |
| LM | 10 | (Bulgaria) Krasimir Balakov | | (substituted off) 79' |
| CF | 9 | (Bulgaria) Ivaylo Yordanov | (yellow card) 75' |
| CF | 11 | (Nigeria) Emmanuel Amunike |
Substitutes:
| GK | 12 | (Federal Republic of Yugoslavia) Zoran Lemajić | | (substituted on) 90' |
| DF | 13 | (Portugal) Nuno Valente |
| MF | 14 | (Portugal) Filipe Ramos | | (substituted on) 76' |
| FW | 15 | (Portugal) Ricardo Sá Pinto | | (substituted on) 79' |
| FW | 16 | (Portugal) Dani |
Manager:
(Portugal) Carlos Queiroz

1994–95 Taça de Portugal Winners
Sporting CP
12th Title

Man of the match

- (Bulgaria) Ivaylo Yordanov (Sporting CP)

Match officials

- Assistant referees:
- Fourth official:

Match rules

- 90 minutes.
- Maximum of three substitutions
