= 1996 Taça de Portugal final =

- Event: 1995–96 Taça de Portugal
Benfica	Sporting CP
3	1
- Date: 18 May 1996
- Venue: Estádio Nacional, Oeiras
- Referee: Vítor Pereira (Lisbon)

The 1996 Taça de Portugal final was the final match of the 1995–96 Taça de Portugal, the 56th season of the Taça de Portugal, the premier Portuguese football cup competition organized by the Portuguese Football Federation (FPF). The match was played on 18 May 1996 at the Estádio Nacional in Oeiras, and opposed two Primeira Liga sides Benfica and Sporting CP. Benfica defeated Sporting CP 3–1 to claim the Taça de Portugal for a twenty third time in their history.

In Portugal, the final was televised live on RTP. As a result of winning the Taça de Portugal, Benfica qualified for the 1996 Supertaça Cândido de Oliveira, where they faced 1995–96 Primeira Divisão winners Porto.

== Match ==
=== Details ===
18 May 1996
17:00 WEST

Benfica	3–1	Sporting CP
Airez 9'; João Pinto 39', 67'		Xavier 83' (pen.)

Estádio Nacional, Oeiras
Referee: Vítor Pereira (Lisbon)

Benfica	Sporting CP

GK	1	(Belgium) Michel Preud'homme
RB	22	(Portugal) Daniel Kenedy		(substituted off) 85'
CB	4	(Portugal) Hélder
CB	3	(Brazil) Ricardo Gomes	(yellow card) 83' (red card) 83'
LB	13	(Portugal) Dimas
DM	6	(Portugal) Paulo Bento
CM	7	(Portugal) José Calado
CM	19	(Portugal) Bruno Caires		(substituted off) 89'
RM	10	(Brazil) Valdo
LM	8	(Portugal) João Pinto (c)
CF	18	(Argentina) Mauro Airez	(yellow card) 28'	(substituted off) 83'
Substitutes:
DF	5	(Brazil) Emerson Thome		(substituted on) 83'
MF	20	(Bulgaria) Ilian Iliev		(substituted on) 85'
FW	25	(Brazil) Marcelo		(substituted on) 89'
Manager:
(Portugal) Mário Wilson

GK	1	(Portugal) Costinha
RB	2	(Portugal) Fernando Nélson
CB	3	(Morocco) Noureddine Naybet
CB	5	(Brazil) Marco Aurélio
LB	17	(Angola) Luís Miguel
DM	8	(Portugal) Pedro Martins		(substituted off) 65'
CM	13	(Portugal) Luís Vidigal
RM	25	(Portugal) Emílio Peixe (c)	(yellow card) 21'	(substituted off) 34'
AM	21	(Portugal) Afonso Martins
LM	9	(Bulgaria) Ivaylo Yordanov		(substituted off) 45'
CF	7	(Portugal) Ricardo Sá Pinto
Substitutes:
MF	10	(Portugal) Carlos Xavier		(substituted on) 65'
MF	22	(Portugal) José Dominguez		(substituted on) 45'
FW	19	(Portugal) Paulo Alves		(substituted on) 34'
Manager:
(Portugal) Octávio Machado

1995–96 Taça de Portugal Winners
Benfica
23rd Title

Match officials

- Assistant referees:
- Fourth official:

Match rules

- 90 minutes.
- Maximum of three substitutions

== The very light incident ==
During this derby match, Rui Mendes (a supporter of Sporting) died on site after he was hit inside the stadium by a very light thrown by Hugo Inácio (a member of the No Name Boys). The death happened just after the first goal of the match, when Benfica's Mauro Airez scored 9 minutes into the game, during the subsequent celebrations of Benfica fans in the stadium. Despite the incident in the stands, the match continued.

Following the death, Sporting paid for Mendes' funeral, and the Portuguese Football Federation, showing solidarity with Mendes' family, gave them a subsidy of around 1,650 escudos, 10 per cent of the gross revenue from the match between the Portugal and the Ukraine national football teams, which took place on 5 October 1996.

Mendes was 36 years old and father of two children. Inácio was sentenced to four years in prison in 1998. After escaping from prison in 2000, he was captured in 2011. According to witnesses, including a former member of No Name Boys, the fatal injuries resulted from a deliberate action to cause bodily harm to members of Juventude Leonina (supporters of Sporting), who were at the opposite end of the stadium. The Portuguese Football Federation was ordered to pay 235,000 euros, instead of the €150,000 initially planned to the relatives of Mendes.

== See also ==
- Derby de Lisboa
- 1995–96 S.L. Benfica season
