= 1995–96 Taça de Portugal =

Tournament details
- Country: Portugal
- Dates: September 1995 – 18 May 1996

Final positions
- Champions: Benfica (23rd title)
- Runners-up: Sporting CP

Tournament statistics
- Top goal scorer(s): Marcelo (5 goals)

The 1995–96 Taça de Portugal was the 57th edition of the Taça de Portugal, a Portuguese football knockout tournament organized by the Portuguese Football Federation. It began in September 1995 and concluded with the final at the Estádio Nacional on 18 May 1996.

Sporting CP were the previous holders, having defeated Marítimo 2–0 in the previous season's final. Benfica defeated Sporting 3–1 in the final to win their 23rd Taça de Portugal. As a result of them winning the domestic cup competition, Benfica faced 1995–96 Primeira Divisão winners Porto in the 1996 Supertaça Cândido de Oliveira.

== Sixth round ==
Ties were played on the 31 January, whilst replays were played between the 7–14 February. Due to the odd number of teams involved at this stage of the competition, Olhanense qualified for the quarter-finals due to having no opponent to face at this stage of the competition.

31 January 1996	Farense (I)	1–1 (a.e.t.)	Benfica (I)	Estádio de São Luís, Faro
			Marcelo 71'	Referee: Veiga Trigo

31 January 1996	Felgueiras (I)	1–2	Penafiel (II)	Estádio Doutor Machado de Matos, Felgueiras

31 January 1996	Marítimo (I)	2–0	Vila Real (III)	Estádio dos Barreiros, Funchal

31 January 1996	Portimonense (III)	0–1	União de Leiria (I)	Estádio Municipal de Portimão, Portimão

31 January 1996	Sporting CP (I)	4–1	Campomaiorense (I)	Estádio José Alvalade, Lisbon
	Yordanov 1'; Barbosa 37'; Amuneke 43', 67'		Silvério 72'

31 January 1996	Sporting de Lamego (III)	1–1 (a.e.t.)	Porto (I)	Estádio dos Remédios, Lamego
	Lapa 119'		Domingos 108'

31 January 1996	Vitória de Guimarães (I)	1–0	Belenenses (I)	Estádio D. Afonso Henriques, Guimarães
	Ricardo Lopes 66'

7 February 1996 Replay	Porto (I)	1–0	Sporting de Lamego (III)	Estádio das Antas, Porto
	Drulović 88'

14 February 1996 Replay	Benfica (I)	1–0	Farense (I)	Estádio da Luz, Lisbon
	Airez 60', 68'; Marcelo 81'			Referee: José Leirós

== Quarter-finals ==
Ties were played on the 25 February.

25 February 1996	Benfica (I)	1–0 (a.e.t.)	Vitória de Guimarães (I)	Estádio da Luz, Lisbon
	Marcelo 98'			Referee: Martins dos Santos

25 February 1996	Olhanense (III)	1–2	Sporting CP (I)	Estádio José Arcanjo, Olhão
	Xabregas 18'		Alves 10'; Sá Pinto 90'

25 February 1996	Porto (I)	2–0	Penafiel (II)	Estádio das Antas, Porto
	João Manuel Pinto 50', 76'

25 February 1996	União de Leiria (I)	2–1	Marítimo (I)	Estádio Municipal da Marinha Grande, Marinha Grande

== Semi-finals ==
Ties were played between the 10–24 April.

10 April 1996	Benfica (I)	2–0 (a.e.t.)	União de Leiria (I)	Estádio da Luz, Lisbon
	Marcelo 113', 119'		Crespo (yellow card) 61' (yellow-red card) 81'; Hugo (yellow card) 66' (yellow-red card) 84'	Referee: Lucílio Batista

10 April 1996	Porto (I)	1–1 (a.e.t.)	Sporting CP (I)	Estádio das Antas, Porto
	J. Costa 90'		Barbosa 30'	Referee: António Rola

24 April 1996 Replay	Sporting CP (I)	1–0 (a.e.t.)	Porto (I)	Estádio José Alvalade, Lisbon
	Martins 117'			Referee: Bento Marques

== Final ==
18 May 1996
17:00 WEST

Benfica	3–1	Sporting CP
Airez 9'; João Pinto 39', 67'		Xavier 83' (pen.)

Estádio Nacional, Oeiras
Referee: Vítor Pereira (Lisbon)
