= 1994 Taça de Portugal final =

- Event: 1993–94 Taça de Portugal
Porto	Sporting CP
Porto	Sporting CP
0	0
- Date: 5 June 1994
- Venue: Estádio Nacional, Oeiras
- Referee: Fortunato Azevedo (Braga)

Replay
Porto	Sporting CP
2	1
- Date: 10 June 1994
- Venue: Estádio Nacional, Oeiras
- Referee: José Pratas (Évora)

The 1994 Taça de Portugal final was the final match of the 1993–94 Taça de Portugal, the 54th season of the Taça de Portugal, the premier Portuguese football cup competition organized by the Portuguese Football Federation (FPF). The final was played at the Estádio Nacional in Oeiras, and opposed two Primeira Liga sides Porto and Sporting CP. As the inaugural final match finished goalless, the final was replayed five days later at the same venue with the Dragões defeating the Leões 2–1 to claim their eighth Taça de Portugal.

In Portugal, the final was televised live on RTP. As a result of Porto winning the Taça de Portugal, the Dragões qualified for the 1994 Supertaça Cândido de Oliveira where they took on 1993–94 Primeira Divisão winners Benfica.

== Match ==
=== Details ===
5 June 1994
17:00 CEST

Porto	0–0 (a.e.t.)	Sporting CP

Estádio Nacional, Oeiras
Referee: Fortunato Azevedo (Braga)

Porto	Sporting CP

GK	1	(Portugal) Vítor Baía
RB	2	(Portugal) João Pinto (c)
CB	4	(Brazil) Aloísio	Booked
CB	5	(Portugal) Fernando Couto
LB	3	(Portugal) Rui Jorge
CM	11	(Portugal) Carlos Secretário
CM	10	(Portugal) Paulinho Santos
RM	7	(Federal Republic of Yugoslavia) Ljubinko Drulović
AM	6	(Portugal) António André	Booked	(substituted off) 87'
LM	8	(Portugal) António Folha
CF	9	(Romania) Ion Timofte		(substituted off) 87'
Substitutes:
MF	14	(Portugal) Jorge Couto		(substituted on) 87'
MF	15	(Portugal) Rui Filipe		(substituted on) 87'
Manager:
(England) Bobby Robson

GK	1	(Federal Republic of Yugoslavia) Zoran Lemajić
RB	2	(Portugal) Fernando Nélson
CB	4	(Federal Republic of Yugoslavia) Budimir Vujačić
CB	5	(Netherlands) Stan Valckx (c)
LB	3	(Portugal) Paulo Torres
RM	7	(Portugal) Luís Figo
CM	10	(Portugal) Emílio Peixe	(substituted off) 78'
CM	6	(Portugal) Paulo Sousa
LM	8	(Portugal) António Pacheco	(substituted off) 87'
AM	11	(Portugal) Capucho
CF	9	(Poland) Andrzej Juskowiak
Substitutes:
DF		(Portugal) Marinho	(substituted on) 78'
MF	16	(Portugal) Poejo	(substituted on) 87'
Manager:
(Portugal) Carlos Queiroz

Match officials

- Assistant referees:
- Fourth official:

Match rules

- 90 minutes.
- 30 minutes of extra time if necessary.
- Maximum of two substitutions

== Replay ==
=== Details ===
10 June 1994
17:00 CEST

Porto	2–1 (a.e.t.)	Sporting CP
Rui Jorge 35'; Aloísio 91'		Vujačić 55'

Estádio Nacional, Oeiras
Referee: José Pratas (Évora)

Porto	Sporting CP

GK	1	(Portugal) Vítor Baía
RB	2	(Portugal) João Pinto (c)
CB	4	(Brazil) Aloísio
CB	5	(Portugal) Fernando Couto	Booked
LB	3	(Portugal) Rui Jorge
CM	11	(Portugal) Carlos Secretário
CM	10	(Portugal) Paulinho Santos
RM	7	(Serbia and Montenegro) Ljubinko Drulović
AM	6	(Portugal) António André		(substituted off) 82'
LM	8	(Portugal) António Folha
CF	9	(Romania) Ion Timofte		(substituted off) 67'
Substitutes:
MF	14	(Portugal) Jorge Couto		(substituted on) 67'
MF		(Cape Verde) Vinha		(substituted on) 82'
Manager:
(England) Bobby Robson

GK	1	(Serbia and Montenegro) Zoran Lemajić
RB	2	(Portugal) Fernando Nélson
CB	4	(Serbia and Montenegro) Budimir Vujačić		(substituted off) 67'
CB	5	(Portugal) Emílio Peixe (c)	(yellow card) (red card) 91'
LB	3	(Portugal) Paulo Torres		(substituted off) 65'
CM	6	(Portugal) Paulo Sousa
CM	10	(Portugal) Poejo
RM	7	(Portugal) Luís Figo
AM	9	(Portugal) Capucho
LM	8	(Portugal) António Pacheco	(yellow card) 103' (red card)
CF	11	(Portugal) Jorge Cadete
Substitutes:
DF		(Portugal) Carlos Jorge		(substituted on) 67'
DF	13	(Portugal) Marinho		(substituted on) 65'
Manager:
(Portugal) Carlos Queiroz

1993–94 Taça de Portugal Winners
Porto
8th Title

Match officials

- Assistant referees:
- Fourth official:

Match rules

- 90 minutes.
- 30 minutes of extra time if necessary.
- Maximum of two substitutions

== See also ==
- FC Porto–Sporting CP rivalry
