= 1995 Supertaça Cândido de Oliveira =

- Event: Supertaça Cândido de Oliveira (Portuguese Super Cup)
Sporting CP	Porto
3	0
- Sporting CP won the replay 3–0, after 2–2 aggregate score over the two legs.

First leg
Sporting CP	Porto
0	0
- Date: 6 August 1995
- Venue: Estádio José Alvalade, Lisbon
- Referee: Lourenço Ferreira (Leiria)

Second leg
Porto	Sporting CP
2	2
- Date: 23 August 1995
- Venue: Estádio das Antas, Porto
- Referee: António Rola (Santarém)

The 1995 Supertaça Cândido de Oliveira was the 17th edition of the Supertaça Cândido de Oliveira, the annual Portuguese football season-opening match contested by the winners of the previous season's top league and cup competitions (or cup runner-up in case the league- and cup-winning club is the same). The 1995 Supertaça Cândido de Oliveira was contested over two legs, and opposed Porto and Sporting CP of the Primeira Liga. Porto qualified for the SuperCup by winning the 1994–95 Primeira Divisão, whilst Sporting CP qualified for the Supertaça by winning the 1994–95 Taça de Portugal.

The first leg which took place at the Estádio José Alvalade, saw a goalless score. The second leg which took place at the Estádio das Antas finished tied at two goals a piece (2–2 on aggregate), which led to the Supertaça being replayed in April 1996. The replay which took place at Paris Saint-Germain's Parc des Princes in France, saw the Leões defeat the Dragões 3–0 which would claim the Leões a third Supertaça.

== First leg ==
=== Details ===
6 August 1995

Sporting CP	0–0	Porto

Estádio José Alvalade, Lisbon
Referee: Lourenço Ferreira (Leiria)

Sporting CP	Porto

GK	1	(Portugal) Luís Vasco
RB	2	(Portugal) Fernando Nélson
CB	3	(Morocco) Noureddine Naybet	(yellow card) 23'
CB	5	(Brazil) Marco Aurélio
LB	6	(Federal Republic of Yugoslavia) Budimir Vujacic
CM	4	(Portugal) Oceano (c)	(yellow card) 4'	(substituted off) 57'
CM	8	(Portugal) Pedro Martins	(yellow card) 15' (yellow-red card) 85'
AM	16	(Brazil) Roberto Assis	(yellow card) 28'
RW	7	(Portugal) Ricardo Sá Pinto	(red card) 34'
LW	11	(Portugal) Jorge Cadete	(yellow card) 4'	(substituted off) 67'
CF	14	(Nigeria) Emmanuel Amunike	(yellow card) 52'
Substitutes:
GK	24	(Portugal) Tiago
MF	13	(Portugal) Luís Vidigal
MF	22	(Portugal) José Dominguez
MF	23	(Portugal) Pedro Barbosa		(substituted on) 57'
FW	28	(Ivory Coast) Ahmed Ouattara		(substituted on) 67'
Manager:
(Portugal) Carlos Queiroz

GK	12	(Portugal) Silvino
RB	7	(Portugal) Carlos Secretário
CB	4	(Brazil) Aloísio
CB	22	(Portugal) Jorge Costa	(yellow card) 4'
LB	3	(Portugal) Rui Jorge	(yellow card) 58'
CM	20	(Portugal) Paulinho Santos
CM	23	(Brazil) Emerson	(yellow card) 15' (yellow-red card) 24'
AM	6	(Hungary) Péter Lipcsei
RW	21	(Brazil) Edmilson		(substituted off) 79'
LW	30	(Portugal) António Folha
CF	9	(Portugal) Domingos (c)		(substituted off) 66'
Substitutes:
GK	24	(Portugal) Vítor Nóvoa
DF	2	(Portugal) João Pinto
DF	5	(Brazil) Zé Carlos
MF	8	(Portugal) Rui Barros		(substituted on) 79'
FW	24	(Poland) Grzegorz Mielcarski	(red card) 82'	(substituted on) 66'
Manager:
(Portugal) Augusto Inácio

Match officials

- Assistant referees:
- Fourth official:

Match rules

- 90 minutes.
- Maximum of three substitutions

== Second leg ==
=== Details ===
23 August 1995

Porto	2–2	Sporting CP
Domingos 19', 53'		Naybet 42'; Ahmed Ouattara 74'

Estádio das Antas, Porto
Referee: António Rola (Santarém)

Porto	Sporting CP

GK	1	(Portugal) Vítor Baía
CB	4	(Brazil) Aloísio (c)
CB	5	(Brazil) Zé Carlos	(yellow card) 46'
CB	7	(Portugal) Carlos Secretário	(yellow card) 55'
CM	20	(Portugal) Paulinho Santos	(yellow card) 29'
CM	23	(Brazil) Emerson	(yellow card) 76'
RM	8	(Portugal) Rui Barros
AM	13	(Portugal) José Semedo		(substituted off) 57'
LM	21	(Brazil) Edmilson
CF	9	(Portugal) Domingos
CF	11	(Federal Republic of Yugoslavia) Ljubinko Drulovic		(substituted off) 57'
Substitutes:
GK	12	(Portugal) Silvino
DF	2	(Portugal) João Pinto
DF	22	(Portugal) Jorge Costa
MF	10	(Trinidad and Tobago) Russell Latapy		(substituted on) 57'
FW	30	(Portugal) António Folha	(yellow card) 85'	(substituted on) 57'
Manager:
(Portugal) Augusto Inácio

GK	1	(Portugal) Costinha	(red card) 82'
RB	2	(Portugal) Fernando Nélson
CB	3	(Morocco) Noureddine Naybet
CB	5	(Brazil) Marco Aurélio
LB	23	(Portugal) Pedro Barbosa	(yellow card) 10'	(substituted off) 55'
DM	13	(Portugal) Luís Vidigal		(substituted off) 25'
CM	4	(Portugal) Oceano (c)	(yellow card) 52'
CM	8	(Portugal) Pedro Martins	(yellow card) 11'
AM	16	(Brazil) Roberto Assis		(substituted off) 45'
CF	14	(Nigeria) Emmanuel Amunike
CF	28	(Ivory Coast) Ahmed Ouattara
Substitutes:
GK	12	(Portugal) Luís Vasco
MF	21	(Portugal) Afonso Martins		(substituted on) 45'
MF	22	(Portugal) José Dominguez	(yellow card) 39'	(substituted on) 25'
FW	15	(Mozambique) Chiquinho Conde
FW	19	(Portugal) Paulo Alves		(substituted on) 55'
Manager:
(Portugal) Carlos Queiroz

Match officials

- Assistant referees:
- Fourth official:

Match rules

- 90 minutes.
- Maximum of three substitutions

== Replay ==
=== Details ===
30 April 1996

Porto	0–3	Sporting CP
		Sá Pinto 9', 38'; Xavier 86' (pen.)

Parc des Princes, Paris
Referee: Juvenal Silvestre (Setúbal)

Porto	Sporting CP

GK	12	(Portugal) Silvino	(yellow card) 86'
RB	7	(Portugal) Carlos Secretário
CB	4	(Brazil) Aloísio (c)	(yellow card) 52'
CB	19	(Portugal) João Manuel Pinto
LB	3	(Portugal) Rui Jorge
RM	8	(Portugal) Rui Barros		(substituted off) 64'
CM	20	(Portugal) Paulinho Santos
CM	23	(Brazil) Emerson	(yellow card) 29'
LM	11	(Federal Republic of Yugoslavia) Ljubinko Drulović
SS	21	(Brazil) Edmilson		(substituted off) 70'
CF	9	(Portugal) Domingos	(yellow card) 46'
Substitutes:
GK	35	(Portugal) Vítor Baía
DF	2	(Portugal) João Pinto
DF	25	(Portugal) Manuel Matias	(yellow card) 86'	(substituted on) 70'
MF	18	(Portugal) Bino
FW	30	(Portugal) António Folha		(substituted on) 64'
Manager:
(England) Bobby Robson

GK	1	(Portugal) Costinha
RB	2	(Portugal) Fernando Nélson
CB	3	(Morocco) Noureddine Naybet
CB	5	(Brazil) Marco Aurélio (c)
LB	26	(Angola) Luís Miguel
DM	13	(Portugal) Luís Vidigal
RM	21	(Portugal) Afonso Martins		(substituted off) 88'
CM	25	(Portugal) Emílio Peixe		(substituted off) 70'
LM	23	(Portugal) Pedro Barbosa	(yellow card) 33'	(substituted off) 37'
CF	7	(Portugal) Ricardo Sá Pinto
CF	14	(Nigeria) Emmanuel Amunike	(red card) 89'
Substitutes:
GK	24	(Portugal) Tiago
MF	9	(Bulgaria) Ivaylo Yordanov		(substituted on) 70'
MF	10	(Portugal) Carlos Xavier		(substituted on) 37'
FW	19	(Portugal) Paulo Alves		(substituted on) 88'
FW	28	(Ivory Coast) Ahmed Ouattara
Manager:
(Portugal) Octávio Machado

Match officials

- Assistant referees:
- Fourth official:

Match rules

- 90 minutes.
- 30 minutes of extra time if necessary.
- Penalty shoot-out if scores still level.
- Maximum of three substitutions

1995 Supertaça Cândido de Oliveira Winners
Sporting CP
3rd Title

== See also ==
- FC Porto–Sporting CP rivalry
- 1995–96 Primeira Liga
- 1995–96 Taça de Portugal
