= Bino (footballer, born 1972) =

Portuguese footballer

Personal information
- Full name: Manuel Albino Morim Maçães
- Date of birth: 19 December 1972 (age 53)
- Place of birth: Póvoa de Varzim, Portugal
- Height: 1.76 m (5 ft 9 in)
- Position: Midfielder

Team information
- Current team: Portugal U17 (manager)

Youth career
- 1983–1987: Varzim
- 1987–1991: Porto

Senior career*
Years	Team	Apps	(Gls)
1991–1998	Porto	16	(4)
1991–1992	→ Rio Ave (loan)	32	(11)
1993–1994	→ Salgueiros (loan)	32	(1)
1994–1995	→ Belenenses (loan)	26	(2)
1997–1998	→ Marítimo (loan)	42	(4)
1998–2001	Sporting CP	41	(2)
2001–2003	Tenerife	50	(2)
2003–2005	Marítimo	21	(1)
2005–2009	Moreirense	69	(0)
Total		329	(27)

International career
2000–2002	Portugal	3	(0)

Managerial career
- 2012–2013: Padroense (U17)
- 2013: Porto (U17 assistant)
- 2014–2017: Porto (U17)
- 2019–2021: Vitória Guimarães B
- 2021: Vitória Guimarães
- 2021–2022: União Leiria
- 2022–2023: Portugal U20
- 2023–2024: Portugal U16
- 2024–: Portugal U17
Medal record
Men's football
Representing Portugal
UEFA European Under-21 Championship
Runner-up	1994 France
FIFA U-17 World Cup
Third place	1989 Scotland
UEFA European Under-17 Championship
Winner	1989 Denmark
Representing Portugal (as manager)
FIFA U-17 World Cup
Winner	2025 Qatar
UEFA European Under-17 Championship
Winner	2025 Albania
- * Club domestic league appearances and goals

Manuel Albino Morim Maçães (born 19 December 1972), known as Bino, is a Portuguese former professional footballer who played as a central midfielder, currently manager of the Portugal national under-17 team.

He appeared in 178 Primeira Liga games over 12 seasons, scoring a total of 14 goals for Porto, Salgueiros, Belenenses, Marítimo and Sporting CP. He won the championship with the first and last clubs, and also spent one year in La Liga with Tenerife.

== Club career ==
Born in Póvoa de Varzim, Bino joined FC Porto's academy at the age of 14. He made his Primeira Liga debut with the first team on 30 March 1991, playing the second half of the 2–0 home win against S.C. Braga.

Bino spent the better part of the following seven seasons on loan, representing top-division sides S.C. Salgueiros, C.F. Os Belenenses and C.S. Marítimo and Rio Ave F.C. of the Segunda Liga. Of the three national championships he won while with Porto, he only contributed significantly in 1995–96, starting four times in 12 matches and scoring two goals.

In the summer of 1998, Bino signed with Sporting CP alongside teammate Rui Jorge, as Paulo Costinha and Emílio Peixe moved in the opposite direction. He made 12 appearances in the 1999–2000 campaign, helping the club win the domestic league for the first time in 18 years.

In July 2001, Bino moved abroad after agreeing to a contract at CD Tenerife. His first game in the Spanish La Liga took place on 9 September, in a 3–0 away loss to RC Celta de Vigo. He scored his only goal of the relegation-ending season in the return fixture the following January, a 1–1 draw at the Estadio Heliodoro Rodríguez López where he also played 90 minutes.

Bino returned to Marítimo and the Portuguese top flight on 16 July 2003, but featured sparingly during his two-year spell in Madeira. He retired at the age of 36 after four years with Moreirense FC, one in the second tier and three in the third.

== International career ==
Bino won his first cap for Portugal on 11 October 2000, starting and finishing a 2–0 away victory over the Netherlands for the 2002 FIFA World Cup qualifiers.

== Coaching career ==
In 2010, Bino returned to Sporting as a scout. He subsequently rejoined Porto, as youth manager of Padroense F.C. who acted as the farm team.

In early 2014, following an assistant stint, Bino was appointed head coach of Porto's under-17s. He left the position in June 2017, being replaced by Mário Silva.

Bino signed a two-and-a-half-year deal at Vitória de Guimarães' reserves on 10 December 2019. On 5 April 2021 he became the third coach of the season at the helm of the first team, after the dismissal of João Henriques. Four days later on his professional management debut, the side lost 3–0 at Portimonense SC. He resigned on 13 May with two wins from seven, leaving Moreno to end the campaign as the club's fourth manager.

On 26 October 2021, Bino replaced B-SAD-bound Filipe Cândido in charge of U.D. Leiria. Having been eliminated from the play-offs by F.C. Alverca in his one season in charge of the Liga 3 team, his contract was not renewed in May.

In 2025, Bino led the Portugal under-17 side to victory in both the UEFA European Championship and the subsequent FIFA World Cup.

== Managerial statistics ==
As of 15 May 2022

Managerial record by team and tenure
Team	Nat	From	To	Record								Ref
Team	Nat	From	To	G	W	D	L	GF	GA	GD	Win %	Ref
Vitória Guimarães B	(Portugal)	10 December 2019	5 April 2021	29	14	12	3	61	29	+32	48.28	
Vitória Guimarães	(Portugal)	5 April 2021	13 May 2021	7	2	1	4	6	9	−3	28.57	
União Leiria	(Portugal)	25 October 2021	17 May 2022	24	13	7	4	38	21	+17	54.17	
Total				60	29	20	11	105	59	+46	48.33	—

== Honours ==
=== Player ===
Porto

- Primeira Liga: 1992–93, 1995–96, 1996–97
- Supertaça Cândido de Oliveira: 1996

Sporting CP

- Primeira Liga: 1999–2000
- Supertaça Cândido de Oliveira: 2000

=== Manager ===
Portugal U17

- FIFA U-17 World Cup: 2025
- UEFA European Under-17 Championship: 2025
