= Nuno Valente =

Portuguese footballer

Personal information
- Full name: Nuno Jorge Pereira da Silva Valente
- Date of birth: 12 September 1974 (age 52)
- Place of birth: Lisbon, Portugal
- Height: 1.81 m (5 ft 11 in)
- Positions: Left-back; winger

Youth career
- 1985–1989: Sporting CP
- 1989–1990: Vitória Lisboa
- 1990–1993: Sporting CP

Senior career*
Years	Team	Apps	(Gls)
1993–1999	Sporting CP	36	(1)
1993–1994	→ Portimonense (loan)	26	(1)
1996–1997	→ Marítimo (loan)	30	(0)
1999–2002	União Leiria	87	(2)
2002–2005	Porto	56	(0)
2005–2009	Everton	45	(0)
Total		280	(4)

International career
1993	Portugal U18	1	(0)
1995	Portugal U21	1	(0)
2002–2008	Portugal	33	(1)

Managerial career
- 2017: Trofense
Medal record
Men's football
Representing Portugal
UEFA European Championship
Runner-up	2004 Portugal
- * Club domestic league appearances and goals

Nuno Jorge Pereira da Silva Valente OIH (Portuguese pronunciation: [ˈnunu vɐˈlẽtɨ]; born 12 September 1974) is a former Portuguese professional footballer who played as a left-back or a winger. He later became a manager.

He played professionally in Portugal and England for Sporting, Portimonense, Marítimo, União Leiria, Porto and Everton.

Valente represented Portugal at international level, participating at Euro 2004 (where Portugal became runners-up) and the 2006 World Cup.

== Playing career ==
=== Club ===
Born in Lisbon, Valente began his career at second division club Portimonense on loan from Sporting CP. However, he found first-team chances limited at the former side and despite success in helping win the Portuguese Cup in 1995, he was loaned again in the 1996–97 season to Marítimo, also in the Primeira Liga.

Valente signed with União Leiria in the summer of 1999, where he spent three years as an undisputed starter. In 2002, former Leiria's manager José Mourinho recognized Valente's talent and picked him, alongside teammate Derlei, as his first signings for Porto. The former repaid the coach's faith with some good displays as Porto romped to victory in the national championship and defeated Celtic 3–2 in the UEFA Cup.

The following campaign, Valente helped his club to Portuguese and Champions League wins, with the defender appearing in 11 games during the latter competition's run, ten of those complete. At the season's closure, he renewed his contract until 2007.

After Mourinho signed for Chelsea, Valente picked up a succession of injuries. He only played eight matches in the entire domestic league, but returned in time to face Inter Milan in the Champions League round of 16, not being able to prevent his team losing 2–4 on aggregate.

After another poor year, which included an ultimatum by Porto president Jorge Nuno Pinto da Costa that ordered him to choose between club or national team, eventually leading to a suspension, on 28 August 2005 Valente moved to Everton on a three-year deal worth €2.2 million, under recommendation of mentor Mourinho, after the English had lost regular left-back Alessandro Pistone to injury. He took a while to adapt to the hectic pace of the Premier League, but became a regular from then on – in 2005–06 and 2006–07 he was considered first-choice, but faced stiff competition from Gary Naysmith; in February 2007, the Merseyside club took the option of a one-year extension to his contract, tying him until June of the following year.

In early May 2008, Valente signed another one-year link, but he eventually fell down the pecking order at the Toffees, usually backing Leighton Baines. Furthermore, with centre back Joleon Lescott also being able to play the position and with Valente also suffering from injury problems, he received little playing time during 2008–09, being released on 12 June 2009 and choosing to retire from playing after appearing in 60 competitive games in four seasons.

=== International ===
A full Portugal international since after the 2002 FIFA World Cup, Valente was first-choice for the national side during the runner-up campaign at UEFA Euro 2004, played in home soil. During 2005 he suffered a thigh strain, but recovered in time to play in the 2006 World Cup, again playing a key part in their eventual fourth-place finish; in the quarter-final match against England he appeared to handball a David Beckham cross, but Horacio Elizondo did not award a penalty and his team eventually advanced after a shootout.

After playing only once during the Euro 2008 qualifiers, Valente retired from international football in September 2008.

== Coaching career ==
Upon his retirement, Valente was appointed Everton's official scout in Portugal. After one year, he returned to main club Sporting and joined Paulo Sérgio's coaching staff.

Valente kickstarted his coaching career on 11 October 2017, replacing Fernando Mira at the helm of C.D. Trofense in the Portuguese third division. Less than two months later, after six official matches and five losses, he was fired.

== Career statistics ==
=== Club ===
Appearances and goals by club, season and competition
Club	Season	League			National Cup		League Cup		Continental		Total	
Club	Season	Division	Apps	Goals	Apps	Goals	Apps	Goals	Apps	Goals	Apps	Goals
Portimonense (loan)	1993–94	Segunda Liga	26	1								
Sporting	1994–95	Primeira Liga	9	0								
Sporting	1995–96	Primeira Liga	9	0								
Sporting	1997–98	Primeira Liga	6	0								
Sporting	1998–99	Primeira Liga	12	1								
Sporting	Total		36	1								
Marítimo (loan)	1996–97	Primeira Liga	30	0								
União Leiria	1999–00	Primeira Liga	28	0								
União Leiria	2000–01	Primeira Liga	31	2								
União Leiria	2001–02	Primeira Liga	28	0								
União Leiria	Total		87	2								
Porto	2002–03	Primeira Liga	21	0								
Porto	2003–04	Primeira Liga	27	0								
Porto	2004–05	Primeira Liga	8	0								
Porto	Total		56	0								
Everton	2005–06	Premier League	20	0								
Everton	2006–07	Premier League	14	0								
Everton	2007–08	Premier League	9	0								
Everton	2008–09	Premier League	2	0								
Everton	Total		45	0								
Career total			280	4								

=== International goals ===
Nuno Valente: International goals
No.	Date	Venue	Opponent	Score	Result	Competition
1	31 March 2004	Estádio Municipal de Braga, Braga, Portugal	Italy	1–0	1–2	Friendly

== Honours ==
Sporting

- Taça de Portugal: 1994–95
- Supertaça Cândido de Oliveira: 1995

Porto

- Primeira Liga: 2002–03, 2003–04
- Taça de Portugal: 2002–03
- Supertaça Cândido de Oliveira: 2003, 2004
- UEFA Champions League: 2003–04
- UEFA Cup: 2002–03
- Intercontinental Cup: 2004

Portugal

- UEFA European Championship runner-up: 2004

Orders

- Medal of Merit, Order of the Immaculate Conception of Vila Viçosa (House of Braganza)
