= Oceano Cruz =

Portuguese former footballer (born 1962)

Oceano
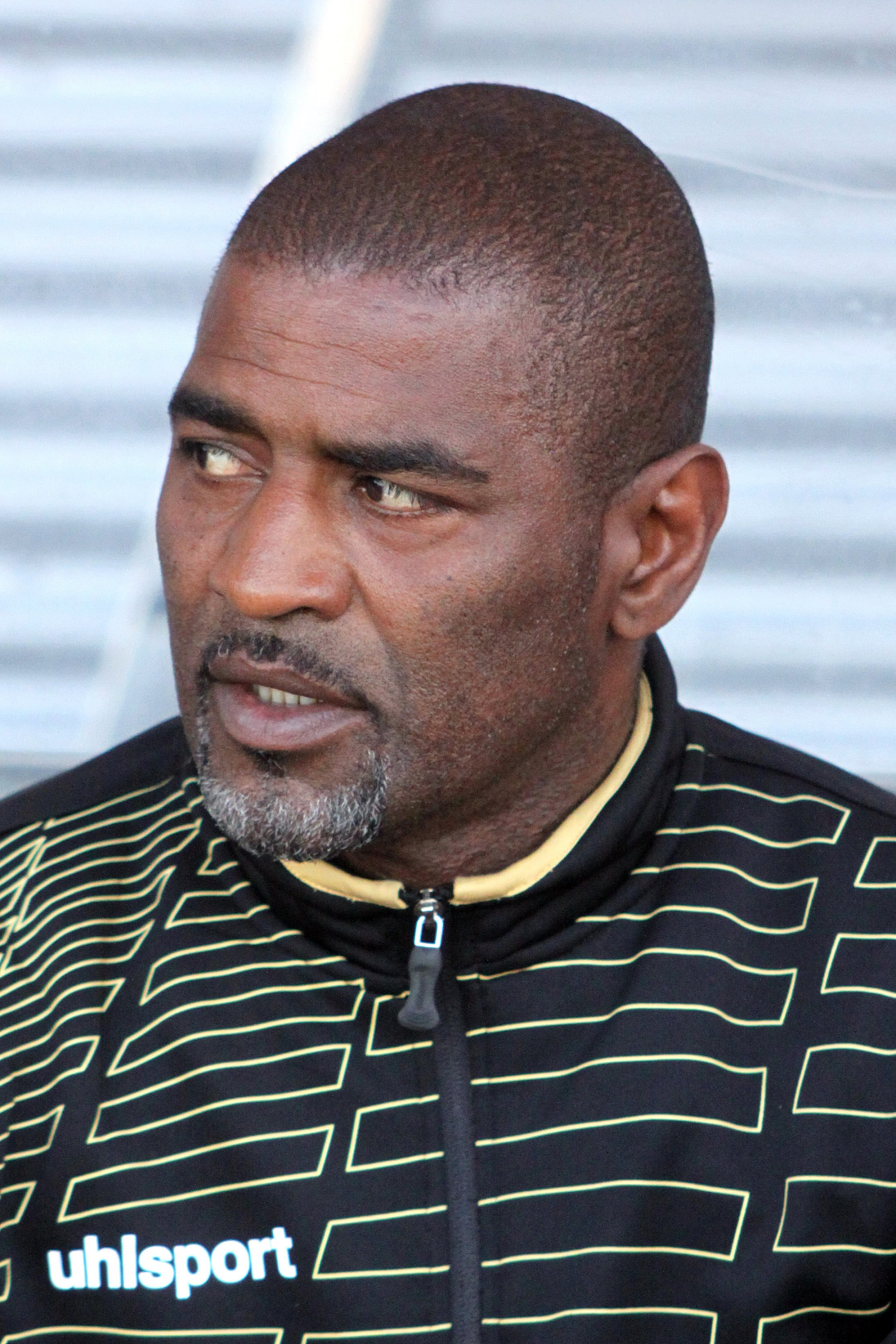
- Oceano with Iran in 2014

Personal information
- Full name: Oceano Andrade da Cruz
- Date of birth: 29 July 1962 (age 64)
- Place of birth: São Vicente, Cape Verde
- Height: 1.75 m (5 ft 9 in)
- Position: Defensive midfielder

Youth career
- 1976–1980: Almada

Senior career*
Years	Team	Apps	(Gls)
1980–1982	Almada		
1982–1983	Odivelas		
1983–1984	Nacional	22	(3)
1984–1991	Sporting CP	202	(17)
1991–1994	Real Sociedad	96	(17)
1994–1998	Sporting CP	106	(22)
1998–1999	Toulouse	30	(6)
Total		456+	(65+)

International career
1985–1998	Portugal	54	(8)

Managerial career
- 2009–2010: Portugal U21
- 2012: Sporting CP B
- 2012: Sporting CP (caretaker)
- 2014–2019: Iran (assistant)
- 2019–2020: Colombia (assistant)
- * Club domestic league appearances and goals

Oceano Andrade da Cruz (born 29 July 1962), known simply as Oceano, is a Portuguese former professional footballer.

A defensive midfielder with tremendous physical strength and leadership skills as his main assets, he was widely regarded as the best footballer ever hailing from Cape Verde, and represented most notably Sporting CP, appearing in more than 400 official matches for the club over 11 seasons (two separate spells).

Having earned more than 50 caps for Portugal, Oceano played with his adopted nation at Euro 1996. He later worked briefly as a manager.

== Club career ==
Born in São Vicente, Cape Verde, Oceano's family immigrated to Portugal when he was a child. He started his career at Almada in the lower leagues and, after spells in the Segunda Liga with Odivelas and Nacional, signed with Sporting CP for the 1984–85 season.

Oceano was an undisputed starter for the Lisbon side during his stay, which consisted at first of seven seasons. In 1991, he moved alongside compatriot and teammate Carlos Xavier to Spain's Real Sociedad, where the pair was equally influential, having been reunited with former Sporting boss John Toshack.

Both Oceano and Xavier returned to the Lions in the summer of 1994, and the former continued to perform at a consistent level until the end of the 1997–98 campaign, when he was 36; his Sporting trophies consisted, however, of a single Taça de Portugal, in 1995. He wrapped up his career in 1999, following a stint in France with Toulouse that ended in relegation to Ligue 2.

After retiring, Oceano worked as a color commentator for several TV networks. In early March 2011, he returned to his main club Sporting, joining newly appointed José Couceiro's coaching staff; exactly one year after, he moved in the same capacity to União de Leiria under another old Sporting acquaintance, José Dominguez.

Oceano started the 2012–13 season in charge of Sporting's reserves in the second division. On 4 October 2012, however, following Ricardo Sá Pinto's dismissal, he was named as caretaker manager of the first team.

Oceano's tenure as head coach of Sporting first consisted of three away games and losses – against Porto in the league (2–0), against Moreirense in the domestic cup (3–2) and at Genk in the group stage of the UEFA Europa League (2–1)– and his spell ended on 29 October 2012 with a 0–0 home draw with Académica de Coimbra in the Primeira Liga.

== International career ==
Oceano played 54 times for Portugal, scoring eight goals. His debut came on 30 January 1985 in a 3–2 friendly defeat to Romania, and his last game occurred thirteen years later in a 3–0 loss against England on 22 April 1998. He was a leading presence in the national team throughout the 1990s, notably at UEFA Euro 1996 where he helped them to the quarter-finals.

Following the Portuguese Football Federation's appointment of Carlos Queiroz in July 2008, Oceano took up a position within the scouting department. He worked alongside former Porto's José Alberto Costa and former IFA Premiership player Julian Ward.

In August 2009, Oceano was appointed head coach of Portugal under-21s, succeeding Rui Caçador. His first match was on the 11th, a 2–1 win over Northern Ireland.

After failing to qualify for the 2011 European Championship, Oceano was dismissed from his position. He again reunited with Queiroz in late March 2014, joining his coaching staff at the Iranian national side prior to the 2014 FIFA World Cup tournament. On 20 February 2019, the pair started working with Colombia.

Oceano da Cruz: International goals
Goal	Date	Venue	Opponent	Score	Result	Competition
1	16 January 1991	Nou Estadi Castalia, Castellón de la Plana, Spain	Spain	0–1	1–1	Friendly
2	12 February 1992	Estádio de São Luís, Faro, Portugal	Netherlands	1–0	2–0	Friendly
3	11 November 1992	Stade de Paris, Paris, France	Bulgaria	2–1	2–1	Friendly
4	10 February 1993	Estádio de São Luís, Faro, Portugal	Norway	1–0	1–1	Friendly
5	10 November 1993	Estádio da Luz (1954), Lisbon, Portugal	Estonia	2–0	3–0	1994 World Cup qualification
6	19 January 1994	Balaídos, Vigo, Spain	Spain	2–2	2–2	Friendly
7	18 December 1994	Estádio da Luz (1954), Lisbon, Portugal	Liechtenstein	3–0	8–0	Euro 1996 qualifying
8	27 March 1996	Estádio do Restelo, Lisbon, Portugal	Greece	1–0	1–0	Friendly

== Managerial statistics ==
Nat	Team	From	To	Record							
Nat	Team	From	To	G	W	D	L	Win %	GF	GA	+/-
(Portugal)	Portugal U21	August 2009	September 2010	10	6	1	3	60.0%	15	9	+6
(Portugal)	Sporting CP B	August 2012	October 2012	9	7	1	1	77.7%	16	7	+9
(Portugal)	Sporting CP	October 2012	October 2012	4	0	1	3	00.0%	2	8	–6
Total				23	13	3	7	56.5%	33	24	+9

== Honours ==
Sporting CP

- Taça de Portugal: 1994–95
- Supertaça Cândido de Oliveira: 1987, 1995
