= Vujačić =

Vujačić (Serbian: Bуjaчић, Slovene: Vujačič) is a Serbian and Montenegrin surname. Notable people with the surname include:

- Budimir Vujačić (born 1964), Montenegrin footballer
- Igor Vujačić (born 1994), Montenegrin footballer
- Aleksander "Sasha" Vujačić (born 1984), Slovenian basketball player of Serbian and Montenegrin descent
