= Mauro Airez =

Argentine footballer (born 1968)

Personal information
- Full name: Mauro Gabriel Airez
- Date of birth: 26 October 1968 (age 58)
- Place of birth: Verónica, Argentina
- Height: 1.75 m (5 ft 9 in)
- Position: Striker

Youth career
- 1986–1987: Gimnasia La Plata

Senior career*
Years	Team	Apps	(Gls)
1987–1989	Gimnasia La Plata	54	(8)
1989–1990	Argentinos Juniors	27	(7)
1990–1991	Independiente	14	(1)
1991	Bari		
1992–1995	Belenenses	118	(32)
1996–1997	Benfica	27	(0)
1997–1998	Estrela da Amadora	14	(1)
1998–1999	Estoril-Praia	9	(0)
Total		263	(49)

International career
1988	Argentina Olympic	4	(0)
1989–1990	Argentina	3	(1)
- * Club domestic league appearances and goals

Mauro Gabriel Airez (born 26 October 1968) is an Argentine retired footballer who played as a striker.

He participated in the 1988 Summer Olympics, and later appeared for the Argentina national team.

== Club career ==
Airez was born in Buenos Aires, and arrived at Gimnasia La Plata at age 18, competing briefly for the youth ranks, before debuting for the main team, helping the achieve a fifth place in the 1987–88 season and adding over 50 league games in two seasons, reaching the national olympic team.

In 1989, he moved to Argentinos Juniors, staying just one season, reaching the Argentina national team, playing alongside Maradona, Simeone or Redondo. In 1991, he had a short stint at Independiente, before moving to Italian side, Bari, a year later.

Without competing in the Biancorossi, Bari intended to ship him Portugal, so he asked Héctor Yazalde for advice, and he promptly told him he should do it. His first season in the Belém side was in the second tier, scoring a career best eleven goals.

Following six seasons, the 27-year-old joined Benfica in December 1995, debuting on 12 January 1996, appearing sporadically in the 18 months he spent there, acting as second choice to players like Donizete or Valdir; his biggest achievement arrived in the 1996 Taça de Portugal Final, with Benfica defeating Sporting CP by 3–1, and Aírez scoring the opener.

In 1997, he moved to Estrela da Amadora, helping the side finish eight place in 1997–98 season, ending his career a year later, at Estoril-Praia, aged 31.

== Honours ==
Benfica

- Taça de Portugal: 1995–96
