= Campo de Jogos do Pragal =

Coordinates: 38.6769°N 9.1693°W

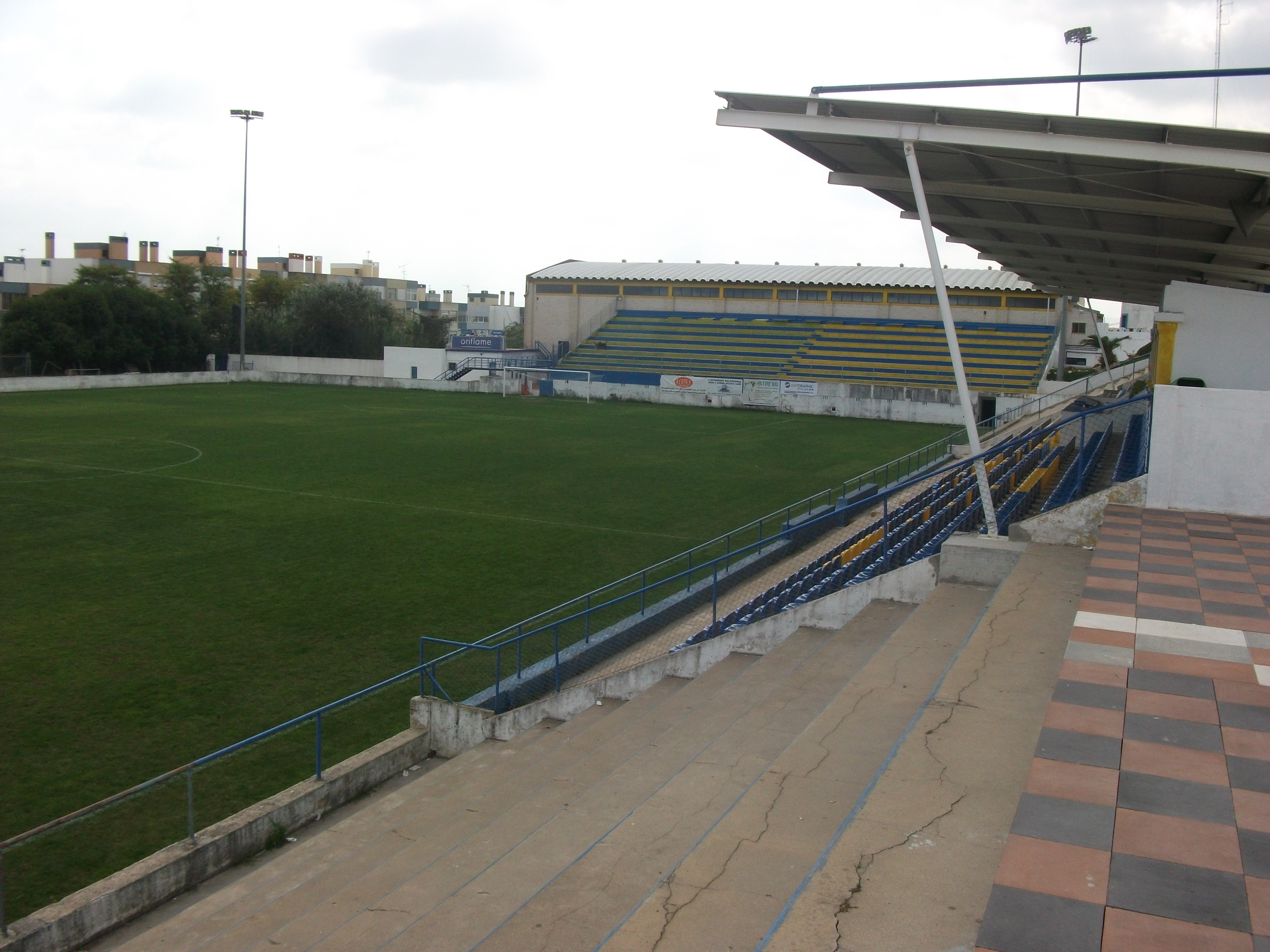
- View from the main stand
- Interactive map of Campo de Jogos do Pragal
- Full name: Campo de Jogos do Pragal
- Capacity: 3,000

Tenant
- Almada Atlético Clube

Campo de Jogos do Pragal is the home soccer stadium of Almada Atlético Clube, a Portuguese sports club based in Almada, Portugal.

The stadium is overlooked by and adjacent to the surrounding area of the Cristo Rei monument.
