= Afonso Martins =

Portuguese footballer

Personal information
- Full name: Afonso Paulo Martins da Agra
- Date of birth: 11 April 1973 (age 53)
- Place of birth: Póvoa de Varzim, Portugal
- Height: 1.70 m (5 ft 7 in)
- Position: Midfielder

Senior career*
Years	Team	Apps	(Gls)
1990–1995	Nancy B	83	(21)
1992–1995	Nancy	55	(2)
1995–2002	Sporting CP	66	(5)
2001–2002	Sporting CP B	28	(12)
2002–2003	Moreirense	26	(7)
2003–2004	Vitória Guimarães	12	(0)
2004–2005	Moreirense	24	(2)
2006–2007	Lixa	16	(2)
Total		310	(51)

International career
1995–1996	Portugal U21	9	(2)
1996	Portugal U23	6	(2)
- * Club domestic league appearances and goals

Afonso Paulo Martins da Agra (born 11 April 1973), known as Martins, is a Portuguese former professional footballer who played as a midfielder.

== Club career ==
Born in Póvoa de Varzim, Martins family emigrated to France when he was very young, and he first played professionally with AS Nancy Lorraine, spending four seasons at the club while making 60 competitive appearances. In 1995–96 he returned to Portugal, signing for Sporting CP.

Martins' tenure at the Primeira Liga side was an inconsistent one: he was a starter initially but, towards the end, was often demoted to the reserves and participated very little in the league victories of 2000 and 2002 (no games whatsoever in the latter, as he was left without a place in the squad and only trained separately).

Martins finished his career in June 2007 at the age of 34, after spells with Moreirense FC, Vitória de Guimarães and lowly F.C. Lixa. He did not have a club in the 2005–06 campaign.

== International career ==
Martins played for the Portugal national team at under-21 level, also appearing at the 1996 Olympic Games in Atlanta where he scored both goals in the 2–0 win over Tunisia in the first match, as the country eventually finished fourth.

== Honours ==
Sporting CP

- Primeira Liga: 1999–2000
- Taça de Portugal: 2001–02
- Supertaça Cândido de Oliveira: 1995
