= Zoran Lemajić =

Montenegrin footballer

Personal information
- Full name: Zoran Lemajić
- Date of birth: 8 November 1960 (age 65)
- Place of birth: Nikšić, SFR Yugoslavia
- Height: 1.96 m (6 ft 5 in)
- Position: Goalkeeper

Team information
- Current team: Stade Lausanne Ouchy (goalkeeping coach)

Youth career
- Sutjeska Nikšić
- –1987: Bokelj

Senior career*
Years	Team	Apps	(Gls)
1987–1989	Priština	42	(0)
1989–1992	Farense	69	(0)
1992–1993	Boavista	20	(0)
1993–1995	Sporting	24	(0)
1995–1996	Marítimo	27	(0)
1996–1998	Dunfermline	3	(0)

Managerial career
- 2006–2007: Grbalj
- 2008–2010: Serbia (goalkeeping coach)
- 2010–2011: Al-Ahly Doha (goalkeeping coach)
- 2010–2014: Montenegro (goalkeeping coach)
- 2014: Bharat FC (goalkeeping coach)
- 2019–2020: Arsenal Tivat
- 2020–: Stade Lausanne Ouchy (goalkeeping coach)
- * Club domestic league appearances and goals

Zoran Lemajić (Cyrillic: Зоран Лeмajић, born 8 November 1960) is a Montenegrin retired association footballer who is a goalkeeping coach of Stade Lausanne Ouchy.

== Playing career ==
=== Club ===
Born in Nikšić, Lemajić first played with FK Sutjeska Nikšić and FK Bokelj, before signing for FK Priština. Then he will spend six seasons in the Portuguese Liga with S.C. Farense, Boavista F.C., Sporting Clube de Portugal and C.S. Marítimo. Between 1996 and 1998 he played in Scotland with Dunfermline Athletic F.C.

== Coaching career ==
After retiring he became goalkeeping coach of FK Mogren, OFK Grbalj, national teams of FR Yugoslavia, Serbia and Montenegro, and Montenegro.

He is member of the direction board of the Montenegrin Football Association since 2001.

== Honours ==
Sporting CP

- Taça de Portugal: 1995
