= Luís Miguel (footballer, born 1971) =

Angolan/Portuguese footballer

Personal information
- Full name: Luís Miguel da Fonseca Silva Costa
- Date of birth: 22 July 1971 (age 55)
- Place of birth: Luanda, Portuguese Angola
- Height: 1.75 m (5 ft 9 in)
- Position: Right back

Youth career
- 1983–1984: Lixa
- 1986–1989: Amarante

Senior career*
Years	Team	Apps	(Gls)
1989–1992	Amarante	15	(5)
1992–1995	Aves	87	(13)
1995–1998	Sporting CP	41	(0)
1998–2002	Braga	81	(1)
1999–2002	Braga B	20	(4)
2002–2004	Paços Ferreira	37	(0)
2004–2005	Felgueiras	30	(0)
Total		311	(23)

International career
1998	Angola	4	(0)

Managerial career
- 2006–2007: Lixa
- 2008: Lousada
- 2008: Ribeirão
- 2009: Lousada
- 2010–2011: Chaves
- 2011: Tirsense
- 2012–2013: Santa Clara
- 2013–2014: Al-Ahli (assistant)
- 2015–2016: Fenerbahçe (assistant)
- 2017: 1860 Munich (assistant)
- 2017–2020: Shanghai Port (assistant)
- 2021: Fenerbahçe (assistant)
- 2021–2022: Corinthians (assistant)
- 2023: Flamengo (assistant)
- 2024: Al-Shabab (assistant)
- 2024–2025: Wolverhampton Wanderers (assistant)
- 2026: Nottingham Forest (assistant)
- * Club domestic league appearances and goals

Luís Miguel da Fonseca Silva Costa (born 22 July 1971), known as Luís Miguel, is an Angolan football coach and former player. He also held Portuguese citizenship.

== Club career ==
Born in Luanda, Portuguese Angola to Portuguese parents, Luís Miguel played nine seasons in the Portuguese Primeira Liga. He totalled 159 games and one goal in the competition, at the service of Sporting CP, Braga and Paços Ferreira.

In the Segunda Liga, Luís Miguel appeared for Aves and Felgueiras, retiring in 2005 after 16 seasons as a professional at the age of 34. During his spell at the Estádio José Alvalade, he took part in 52 competitive matches, his only goal arriving on 26 November 1997 in a 2–3 away loss against Monaco for the group stage of the UEFA Champions League.

In 2006, Luís Miguel started working as a manager, working solely in the Portuguese lower leagues.

== International career ==
Luís Miguel represented Angola internationally. He was part of the squad that competed in the 1998 African Cup of Nations, starting as the tournament ended in group phase elimination.

== Honours ==
Sporting

- Supertaça Cândido de Oliveira: 1995
