= Fernando Festas =

Portuguese footballer and coach

Personal information
- Full name: Fernando António de Carvalho Festas
- Date of birth: 12 June 1956 (age 70)
- Place of birth: Vila do Conde, Portugal
- Position: Centre-back

Youth career
- 1971–1973: Leça
- 1973–1974: Académica
- 1974–1975: Leça

Senior career*
Years	Team	Apps	(Gls)
1975–1979	Varzim	65	(0)
1979–1982	Vitória Guimarães	56	(4)
1982–1984	Sporting CP	26	(0)
1984–1985	Braga	3	(0)
1985–1987	Salgueiros	42	(1)
Total		192	(5)

International career
1983	Portugal	4	(0)

Managerial career
- 1987: Salgueiros
- 1988: Leça
- 1988–1989: Marialvas
- 1989–1990: Freamunde
- 1990–1993: Leça
- 1993–1994: Amora
- 1994: Penafiel
- 1995: Leça
- 1996–1997: Gil Vicente
- 1997–1998: União Madeira
- 1998–1999: União Madeira
- 1999: Leça
- 2000–2001: Vilanovense
- 2001: Tirsense
- 2001–2002: Leça
- * Club domestic league appearances and goals

Fernando António de Carvalho Festas (born 12 June 1956 in Vila do Conde) is a Portuguese retired football central defender and manager.
