= Almada A.C. =

Portuguese sports club

| Home colours | Away colours |

Almada Atlético Clube is a Portuguese sports club based in Almada. They were founded in 1944 and currently play at Campo de Jogos do Pragal.

As of the 2011–12 season they play in I Divisao of the Associação de Futebol de Setúbal regional leagues.

Almada has won three Setúbal District titles and two Terceira Divisão titles. Their best classification overall was a runner-up finish in the Second Division South Zone in 1966.

== Notable players ==
- (Portugal) António Simões (youth)

== Honours ==
- Terceira Divisão: 1948–49, 1955–56
- Setúbal District Championship: 1948–49, 1996–97, 2003–04
