= Carlos Jorge (footballer) =

Portuguese football manager and former player

Personal information
- Full name: Carlos Jorge Camacho Dantas
- Date of birth: 8 November 1966 (age 59)
- Place of birth: Funchal, Portugal
- Height: 1.84 m (6 ft 0 in)
- Position: Centre-back

Youth career
- 1981–1982: Académico Funchal
- 1982–1983: Barreirense Funchal
- 1983–1985: Marítimo

Senior career*
Years	Team	Apps	(Gls)
1985–1992	Marítimo	134	(9)
1987–1988	→ União Madeira (loan)		
1992–1994	Sporting CP	22	(2)
1994–2001	Marítimo	160	(10)
Total		316	(21)

International career
1989	Portugal U21	4	(2)

Managerial career
- 2009–2010: Marítimo B (assistant)
- 2010–2014: Marítimo (assistant)
- * Club domestic league appearances and goals

Carlos Jorge Camacho Dantas (born 8 November 1966), known as Carlos Jorge, is a Portuguese former professional footballer who played as a central defender.

Over 15 seasons, he amassed Primeira Liga totals of 316 games and 21 goals for Marítimo and Sporting CP.

== Club career ==
Born in Funchal, Madeira, Carlos Jorge arrived in C.S. Marítimo's youth system at the age of 16, making his first-team and Primeira Liga debut two years later. After a one-year loan to C.F. União in the Segunda Liga, also in the island, he returned to become an essential defensive unit, making 120 league appearances in four seasons (with nine goals); in the 1990–91 campaign, as his side finished tenth – the top flight in Portugal then comprising 20 teams – he played all 38 games and minutes, scoring a career-best five goals.

In 1992, Carlos Jorge signed with Sporting CP, but featured sparingly over the course of two seasons. He then returned to the Verde-rubros, spending a further seven years always in the top tier; in 1997–98, the everpresent captain scored four times in 30 matches as Marítimo qualified for the UEFA Cup, where they would exit in the first round against Leeds United on penalties.

Carlos Jorge began his managerial career in 2009, acting as assistant coach to both the first and second teams of his main club.
