= Paulo Costinha =

Portuguese footballer (born 1973)

Personal information
- Full name: Paulo Rebelo Costinha Castro
- Date of birth: 22 September 1973 (age 53)
- Place of birth: Braga, Portugal
- Height: 1.84 m (6 ft 1/2 in)
- Position: Goalkeeper

Youth career
- 1984–1988: Braga
- 1988–1992: Boavista

Senior career*
Years	Team	Apps	(Gls)
1992–1993	Boavista	0	(0)
1993–1997	Sporting CP	76	(0)
1997–1999	Porto	2	(0)
1999–2000	Tenerife	9	(0)
2000–2006	União Leiria	118	(0)
2006–2009	Belenenses	33	(0)
Total		238	(0)

International career
1993	Portugal U20	5	(0)
1993–1995	Portugal U21	15	(0)
1996	Portugal U23	4	(0)
Medal record
Men's football
Representing Portugal
UEFA European Under-21 Championship
Runner-up	1994 France
- * Club domestic league appearances and goals

Paulo Rebelo Costinha Castro (born 22 September 1973), known as Costinha, is a Portuguese former professional footballer who played as a goalkeeper.

He appeared in 229 Primeira Liga matches in 16 seasons, mainly with União de Leiria (six years) and Sporting CP (four).

== Club career ==
Costinha was born in Braga. A product of Boavista FC's youth system, he went on to represent Primeira Liga clubs FC Porto and Sporting CP – being mostly a backup– as well as U.D. Leiria, where he established himself in the top flight.

After a short abroad stint with Spain's CD Tenerife, appearing rarely for the Segunda División team, Costinha joined C.F. Os Belenenses from Leiria for the 2006–07 season. He only was a starter in his first year as he lost his position after the January 2007 arrival of Brazilian Júlio César, being definitely released in the summer of 2009 without any further league appearances and retiring shortly after, aged 35.

== International career ==
Costinha represented Portugal at the 1996 Summer Olympics, playing three matches out of six as the national side finished in fourth place. Previously, he appeared in all the games at the 1993 FIFA World Youth Championship in Australia, with the under-20s losing all three group-stage fixtures (five goals conceded).

== Post-retirement ==
After retiring, Costinha settled in Leiria where he opened a tobacco shop. He also worked as a player agent and in a football academy.

== Honours ==
Sporting CP

- Taça de Portugal: 1994–95
- Supertaça Cândido de Oliveira: 1995

Porto

- Primeira Liga: 1997–98, 1998–99
