= 1995–96 Primeira Divisão =

62nd season of top-tier Portuguese football

Primeira Divisão
- Season: 1995–96
- Champions: Porto; 15th title
- Relegated: Felgueiras; Campomaiorense; Tirsense
- Champions League: Porto (group stage)
- Cup Winners' Cup: Benfica (first round)
- UEFA Cup: Sporting CP (first round); Boavista (first round); V. Guimarães (first round)
- Matches: 306
- Goals: 797 (2.6 per match)
- Top goalscorer: Domingos (25 goals)
- Biggest home win: Sporting CP 7–1 Campomaiorense (18 September 1995)
- Biggest away win: Leça 0–5 Belenenses (30 December 1995)
- Highest scoring: Porto 6–3 Braga (3 March 1996)

The 1995–96 Primeira Divisão was the 62nd edition of top flight of Portuguese football. It started on 19 August 1995 with a match between União de Leiria and Marítimo, and ended on 12 May 1996. Starting from this season, Portugal implemented the three points for a win rule, after FIFA formally adopted the system. The league was contested by 18 clubs with Porto as the defending champions.

Porto won the league and qualified for the 1996–97 UEFA Champions League group stage, Benfica qualified for the 1996–97 UEFA Cup Winners' Cup first round, and Sporting CP, Boavista and V. Guimarães qualified for the 1996–97 UEFA Cup; in opposite, União da Madeira, Beira-Mar and Vitória de Setúbal were relegated to the Liga de Honra. Domingos was the top scorer with 25 goals.

== Promotion and relegation ==
=== Teams relegated to Liga de Honra ===
- União da Madeira
- Beira-Mar
- Vitória de Setúbal

União da Madeira, Beira-Mar and Vitória de Setúbal, were consigned to the Liga de Honra following their final classification in 1994–95 season.

=== Teams promoted from Liga de Honra ===
- Leça
- Campomaiorense
- Felgueiras

The other three teams were replaced by Leça, Campomaiorense and Felgueiras from the Liga de Honra.

== Teams ==
=== Stadia and locations ===
Location of teams in Primeira Divisão 1995-96 (Mainland)
Location of teams in Primeira Divisão 1995-96 (Madeira)

| Team | Head coach | City | Stadium | 1994–95 finish |
|---|---|---|---|---|
| Belenenses | (Portugal) João Alves | Lisbon | Estádio do Restelo | 12th |
| Benfica | (Portugal) Artur Jorge | Lisbon | Estádio da Luz | 3rd |
| Boavista | (Portugal) Manuel José | Porto | Estádio do Bessa | 9th |
| Braga | (Portugal) Manuel Cajuda | Braga | Estádio Primeiro de Maio | 10th |
| Campomaiorense | (Portugal) Manuel Fernandes | Campo Maior | Estádio Capitão Cesar Correia | 2nd in Divisão de Honra |
| Chaves | (Portugal) Vítor Urbano | Chaves | Estádio Municipal de Chaves | 14th |
| Estrela da Amadora | (Portugal) Fernando Santos | Amadora | Estádio José Gomes | 15th |
| Farense | (Spain) Paco Fortes | Faro | Estádio de São Luís | 5th |
| Felgueiras | (Portugal) Jorge Jesus | Felgueiras | Estádio Dr. Machado de Matos | 3rd in Divisão de Honra |
| Gil Vicente | (Portugal) Bernardino Pedroto | Barcelos | Estádio Adelino Ribeiro Novo | 13th |
| Leça | (Portugal) Fernando Festas | Leça da Palmeira | Estádio do Leça FC | 1st in Divisão de Honra |
| Marítimo | (Portugal) Raul Águas | Funchal | Estádio dos Barreiros | 7th |
| Porto | (England) Bobby Robson | Porto | Estádio das Antas | 1st |
| Salgueiros | (Portugal) Mário Reis | Porto | Estádio Engenheiro Vidal Pinheiro | 11th |
| Sporting | (Portugal) Carlos Queiroz | Lisbon | Estádio José Alvalade | 2nd |
| Tirsense | (Portugal) José Romão | Santo Tirso | Estádio Abel Alves de Figueiredo | 8th |
| União de Leiria | (Portugal) Vítor Manuel | Leiria | Estádio Dr. Magalhães Pessoa | 6th |
| Vitória de Guimarães | (Portugal) Vítor Oliveira | Guimarães | Estádio D. Afonso Henriques | 4th |

=== Managerial changes ===
| Team | Outgoing manager | Date of vacancy | Position in table | Incoming manager | Date of appointment |
|---|---|---|---|---|---|
| Benfica | (Portugal) Artur Jorge | 9 September 1995 | 6th | (Mozambique) Mário Wilson | 10 September 1995 |
| Leça | (Portugal) Fernando Festas | 1 October 1995 | 17th | (Portugal) António Pinto | 2 October 1995 |
| Chaves | (Portugal) Vítor Urbano | 5 November 1995 | 17th | (Portugal) Joaquim Teixeira | 6 November 1995 |
| Campomaiorense | (Portugal) Manuel Fernandes | 19 November 1995 | 18th | (Portugal) Diamantino Miranda | 20 November 1995 |
| Vitória de Guimarães | (Portugal) Vítor Oliveira | 17 December 1995 | 6th | (Portugal) Manuel Machado | 23 December 1995 |
| Tirsense | (Portugal) José Romão | 23 December 1995 | 18th | (Portugal) Eurico Gomes | 30 December 1995 |
| Vitória de Guimarães | (Portugal) Manuel Machado | 13 January 1996 | 8th | (Portugal) Jaime Pacheco | 14 January 1996 |
| Sporting | (Portugal) Carlos Queiroz | 17 February 1996 | 3rd | (Portugal) Fernando Mendes | 18 February 1996 |
| Marítimo | (Portugal) Raul Águas | 10 March 1996 | 7th | (Portugal) Rui Vieira | 10 March 1996 |
| Chaves | (Portugal) Joaquim Teixeira | 17 March 1996 | 17th | (Portugal) José Romão | 18 March 1996 |
| Sporting | (Portugal) Fernando Mendes | 31 March 1996 | 4th | (Portugal) Octávio Machado | 1 April 1996 |

== League table ==
| Pos | Team | Pld | W | D | L | GF | GA | GD | Pts | Qualification or relegation |
|---|---|---|---|---|---|---|---|---|---|---|
| 1 | Porto (C) | 34 | 26 | 6 | 2 | 84 | 20 | +64 | 84 | Qualification to Champions League group stage |
| 2 | Benfica | 34 | 22 | 7 | 5 | 56 | 25 | +31 | 73 | Qualification to Cup Winners' Cup first round (Note: Benfica qualified for the Cup Winners' Cup as Portuguese Cup winners) |
| 3 | Sporting CP | 34 | 19 | 10 | 5 | 69 | 27 | +42 | 67 | Qualification to UEFA Cup first round |
| 4 | Boavista | 34 | 19 | 8 | 7 | 59 | 28 | +31 | 65 | Qualification to UEFA Cup first round |
| 5 | Vitória de Guimarães | 34 | 19 | 5 | 10 | 55 | 39 | +16 | 62 | Qualification to UEFA Cup first round |
| 6 | Belenenses | 34 | 14 | 9 | 11 | 53 | 33 | +20 | 51 | |
| 7 | União de Leiria | 34 | 14 | 5 | 15 | 38 | 50 | −12 | 47 | |
| 8 | Braga | 34 | 12 | 9 | 13 | 44 | 47 | −3 | 45 | |
| 9 | Marítimo | 34 | 12 | 7 | 15 | 39 | 53 | −14 | 43 | |
| 10 | Farense | 34 | 10 | 6 | 18 | 36 | 45 | −9 | 36 | |
| 11 | Gil Vicente | 34 | 9 | 9 | 16 | 31 | 49 | −18 | 36 | |
| 12 | Salgueiros | 34 | 7 | 15 | 12 | 39 | 49 | −10 | 36 | |
| 13 | Estrela da Amadora | 34 | 7 | 14 | 13 | 35 | 50 | −15 | 35 | |
| 14 | Leça | 34 | 9 | 7 | 18 | 29 | 55 | −26 | 34 | |
| 15 | Chaves | 34 | 9 | 7 | 18 | 38 | 56 | −18 | 34 | |
| 16 | Felgueiras (R) | 34 | 8 | 9 | 17 | 29 | 47 | −18 | 33 | Relegation to Segunda Divisão de Honra |
| 17 | Campomaiorense (R) | 34 | 10 | 3 | 21 | 32 | 69 | −37 | 33 | Relegation to Segunda Divisão de Honra |
| 18 | Tirsense (R) | 34 | 7 | 10 | 17 | 30 | 53 | −23 | 31 | Relegation to Segunda Divisão de Honra |

Rules for classification: 1st points, 2nd head-to-head, 3rd goals average
(C) Champions; (R) Relegated

== Results ==
| Home \ Away | BEL | BEN | BOA | BRA | CPM | CHA | EST | FAR | FEL | GVI | LEÇ | MAR | POR | SAL | SCP | TIR | ULE | VGU |
|---|---|---|---|---|---|---|---|---|---|---|---|---|---|---|---|---|---|---|
| Belenenses | | 1–0 | 1–2 | 1–1 | 3–1 | 4–1 | 4–1 | 2–1 | 0–1 | 2–2 | 5–0 | 4–1 | 1–1 | 0–1 | 0–1 | 1–1 | 3–1 | 1–0 |
| Benfica | 1–0 | | 1–1 | 3–0 | 2–0 | 2–0 | 1–0 | 0–1 | 1–0 | 3–0 | 4–1 | 5–1 | 2–1 | 0–0 | 0–0 | 2–1 | 4–0 | 1–1 |
| Boavista | 1–0 | 1–3 | | 5–2 | 4–0 | 2–0 | 1–1 | 3–0 | 4–0 | 3–0 | 2–0 | 1–0 | 1–1 | 1–1 | 2–1 | 1–1 | 5–0 | 2–1 |
| Braga | 1–1 | 1–2 | 2–0 | | 1–0 | 1–0 | 2–1 | 3–2 | 2–0 | 1–1 | 3–0 | 1–1 | 0–3 | 2–2 | 1–3 | 4–0 | 0–0 | 4–0 |
| Campomaiorense | 2–3 | 0–0 | 0–2 | 2–0 | | 2–1 | 2–1 | 1–0 | 2–0 | 2–0 | 1–1 | 3–1 | 0–1 | 0–0 | 0–1 | 3–1 | 4–2 | 0–1 |
| Chaves | 1–0 | 1–2 | 2–3 | 1–0 | 4–1 | | 0–0 | 2–1 | 1–0 | 1–0 | 2–2 | 0–2 | 2–3 | 1–1 | 1–1 | 2–0 | 0–1 | 1–2 |
| Estrela da Amadora | 2–2 | 0–1 | 0–0 | 4–2 | 2–0 | 2–3 | | 1–1 | 2–1 | 3–1 | 1–0 | 1–1 | 1–1 | 1–1 | 1–1 | 0–0 | 2–4 | 0–0 |
| Farense | 1–3 | 1–3 | 2–0 | 1–0 | 3–1 | 0–0 | 1–0 | | 0–0 | 5–0 | 2–0 | 2–0 | 0–2 | 4–1 | 0–1 | 2–1 | 1–1 | 0–1 |
| Felgueiras | 0–0 | 1–2 | 2–0 | 1–1 | 3–0 | 2–2 | 2–1 | 3–1 | | 2–2 | 1–2 | 0–3 | 1–1 | 2–0 | 0–1 | 0–1 | 3–0 | 0–3 |
| Gil Vicente | 0–0 | 1–2 | 1–1 | 1–2 | 3–1 | 2–0 | 0–1 | 2–2 | 2–0 | | 0–0 | 1–0 | 0–1 | 1–1 | 0–2 | 1–0 | 1–0 | 2–0 |
| Leça | 0–5 | 0–0 | 0–2 | 0–1 | 4–1 | 4–1 | 0–2 | 2–1 | 1–0 | 0–2 | | 0–0 | 0–2 | 1–1 | 1–1 | 3–1 | 0–1 | 1–0 |
| Marítimo | 1–2 | 2–2 | 2–0 | 2–1 | 3–0 | 0–2 | 1–1 | 0–0 | 0–2 | 1–0 | 2–0 | | 1–1 | 3–1 | 0–5 | 1–0 | 1–0 | 4–0 |
| Porto | 1–0 | 3–0 | 1–0 | 6–3 | 5–0 | 2–0 | 6–0 | 2–0 | 6–2 | 2–0 | 2–0 | 6–0 | | 2–0 | 2–1 | 5–0 | 1–0 | 2–3 |
| Salgueiros | 1–3 | 4–2 | 0–2 | 0–0 | 0–2 | 2–2 | 0–0 | 1–0 | 0–0 | 2–3 | 3–0 | 2–0 | 0–4 | | 2–2 | 1–1 | 4–0 | 1–2 |
| Sporting CP | 3–1 | 2–0 | 0–0 | 0–1 | 7–1 | 4–1 | 6–2 | 5–0 | 4–0 | 4–1 | 2–0 | 2–0 | 0–2 | 2–2 | | 1–0 | 0–0 | 2–3 |
| Tirsense | 0–0 | 0–1 | 1–3 | 2–0 | 2–0 | 2–1 | 0–0 | 2–1 | 0–0 | 1–1 | 1–3 | 2–1 | 2–4 | 2–0 | 1–1 | | 0–1 | 2–2 |
| União de Leiria | 1–0 | 0–2 | 1–0 | 1–0 | 4–0 | 4–1 | 2–1 | 1–0 | 0–0 | 2–0 | 1–3 | 0–4 | 0–0 | 3–2 | 1–2 | 5–1 | | 1–2 |
| Vitória de Guimarães | 1–0 | 2–4 | 1–3 | 1–1 | 4–0 | 2–1 | 3–0 | 1–0 | 2–0 | 2–0 | 2–0 | 6–0 | 0–2 | 1–2 | 1–1 | 2–1 | 3–0 | |

Source: Foradejogo (in Portuguese)
Legend: Blue = home team win; Yellow = draw; Red = away team win.

== Top goalscorers ==
| Rank | Player | Club | Goals |
|---|---|---|---|
| 1 | (Portugal) Domingos | Porto | 25 |
| 2 | (Portugal) João Pinto | Benfica | 18 |
| 3 | (Brazil) Edinho | Guimarães | 15 |
| 3 | (Portugal) Constantino Jardim | Leça | 15 |
| 3 | (Trinidad and Tobago) Leonson Lewis | Felgueiras | 15 |
| 6 | (Brazil) Artur | Boavista | 14 |
| 7 | (Brazil) Maurício Cabedelo | Leiria | 13 |
| 7 | (Brazil) Edmilson | Porto | 13 |
| 9 | (Netherlands) Jimmy Floyd Hasselbaink | Campomaiorense | 12 |
| 10 | (Portugal) Paulo Alves | Sporting | 10 |
| 10 | (Canada) Alex Bunbury | Marítimo | 10 |

== Attendances ==
| # | Club | Average |
|---|---|---|
| 1 | Porto | 24,882 |
| 2 | Sporting | 15,029 |
| 3 | Benfica | 8,706 |
| 4 | Marítimo | 8,176 |
| 5 | Vitória SC | 7,412 |
| 6 | Braga | 6,676 |
| 7 | Farense | 6,412 |
| 8 | Boavista | 5,941 |
| 9 | Felgueiras | 5,588 |
| 10 | Chaves | 5,324 |
| 11 | Os Belenenses | 4,412 |
| 12 | União de Leiria | 4,088 |
| 13 | Salgueiros | 3,824 |
| 14 | Gil Vicente | 3,765 |
| 15 | Campomaiorense | 3,618 |
| 16 | Tirsense | 3,471 |
| 17 | Leça | 3,459 |
| 18 | Estrela da Amadora | 2,724 |
