= Carlos Xavier =

Portuguese footballer (born 1962)

Personal information
- Full name: Carlos Jorge Marques Caldas Xavier
- Date of birth: 26 January 1962 (age 64)
- Place of birth: Lourenço Marques, Mozambique
- Height: 1.76 m (5 ft 9 in)
- Position: Midfielder

Youth career
- 1976–1978: Casa Pia
- 1978–1980: Sporting CP

Senior career*
Years	Team	Apps	(Gls)
1980–1991	Sporting CP	212	(8)
1986–1987	→ Académica (loan)	26	(1)
1991–1994	Real Sociedad	96	(13)
1994–1996	Sporting CP	36	(6)
Total		370	(28)

International career
1980	Portugal U18	6	(0)
1981–1985	Portugal U21	16	(1)
1981–1993	Portugal	10	(0)

Managerial career
- 2004–2005: Estoril (assistant)
- * Club domestic league appearances and goals

Carlos Jorge Marques Caldas Xavier (born 26 January 1962) is a Portuguese former professional footballer who played as a midfielder.

== Club career ==
Born in Lourenço Marques, Portuguese Mozambique, Xavier began his professional career with Lisbon-based Sporting CP, already being a regular first-team fixture at age 19. He played 23 Primeira Liga games as the Lions won the title in the 1981–82 season, which would be the last until 2000.

In 1991, after more than 250 competitive appearances, Xavier moved, alongside compatriot and teammate Oceano, to Spain's Real Sociedad, where the pair was equally influential, having been reunited with former Sporting boss John Toshack at the La Liga side.

Both Xavier and Oceano returned to Sporting in the summer of 1994, and the former played two more years before retiring at the age of 34. In the 2004–05 campaign he had a brief spell at coaching, assisting at another club from the capital and the top division, Estoril.

== International career ==
Xavier won ten caps for Portugal, then switched successfully to its beach soccer team.

== Personal life ==
Xavier's twin brother, Pedro, was also a footballer. A forward, he represented several teams in the country (coinciding with Carlos at Académica de Coimbra) in an 18-year professional career.

Xavier lived in Quinta da Beloura, a gated community in Sintra on the Portuguese Riviera. On 8 September 2023, while speaking to Sporting TV, he referred to Porto Iranian forward Mehdi Taremi as "a Muslim who, when he came to Portugal, didn’t know how to swim and now he knows how to dive"; as a result, the club was fined €15,300 by the Portuguese Football Federation.

== Honours ==
Sporting CP

- Primeira Liga: 1981–82
- Taça de Portugal: 1994–95
- Supertaça Cândido de Oliveira: 1987, 1995
