= Emílio Peixe =

Portuguese football manager and former player (born 1973)

Personal information
- Full name: Emílio Manuel Delgado Peixe
- Date of birth: 16 January 1973 (age 53)
- Place of birth: Nazaré, Portugal
- Height: 1.77 m (5 ft 10 in)
- Position: Defensive midfielder

Youth career
- 1983–1986: Nazarenos
- 1986–1991: Sporting CP

Senior career*
Years	Team	Apps	(Gls)
1991–1995	Sporting CP	104	(2)
1995	Sevilla	5	(0)
1996–1997	Sporting CP	20	(1)
1997–2002	Porto	37	(1)
2002	→ Alverca (loan)	7	(0)
2002–2004	Benfica	2	(0)
2003–2004	→ União Leiria (loan)	2	(0)
Total		177	(4)

International career
1988–1989	Portugal U16	16	(1)
1989	Portugal U17	6	(0)
1988–1990	Portugal U18	18	(0)
1990–1991	Portugal U20	11	(0)
1991–1994	Portugal U21	15	(0)
1996	Portugal U23	6	(0)
1991–1993	Portugal	12	(0)

Managerial career
- 2008–2022: Portugal (youth)
- 2022–2024: Kuwait U23
Medal record
Men's football
Representing Portugal
FIFA U-20 World Cup
Winner	1991 Portugal
FIFA U-17 World Cup
Third place	1989 Scotland
UEFA European Under-17 Championship
Winner	1989 Denmark
Runner-up	1988 Spain
- * Club domestic league appearances and goals

Emílio Manuel Delgado Peixe (born 16 January 1973) is a Portuguese former professional footballer who played mainly as a defensive midfielder. He is currently a manager.

A member of the dubbed Golden Generation who hailed from the Portugal youth teams, he was one of the few to have represented all three major clubs in the country, Sporting CP, Porto and Benfica.

Over the course of 14 seasons, Peixe amassed Primeira Liga totals of 172 games and four goals. In 2008, he started working as a manager.

== Playing career ==
Born in Nazaré, Peixe emerged from Sporting CP's prolific youth ranks, making his first-team debut shortly after another club great, Luís Figo. In the summer of 1991, already firmly established in the starting XI, he was essential in helping the Portuguese under-20s to win the FIFA World Cup in Lisbon, where he also received the Golden Ball.

After helping Sporting, with Figo, to claim the 1995 Taça de Portugal, Peixe moved abroad to Sevilla, accompanying coach Toni. However, grossly unsettled, he left in the next winter transfer window, returning to the Lions but never regaining his previous form.

Peixe then played five seasons at Porto, with a six-month loan spell with Alverca in between. He retired in June 2004, following unassuming one-season stints with Benfica and União de Leiria.

Also internationally, Peixe earned 12 caps with the full side, all between 18 and 20 years old. He also helped Portugal to a fourth-place finish at the 1996 Summer Olympics.

== Coaching career ==
Peixe returned to the national team in 2008, being put in charge of the under-16s. In the following years, he worked with several of its youth sides as both head coach and assistant manager.

Both Peixe and Rui Bento left the Portuguese Football Federation set-up in August 2022 to take the helm at Kuwait's Olympic and senior teams, respectively.

== Honours ==
Sporting CP

- Taça de Portugal: 1994–95
- Supertaça Cândido de Oliveira: 1995

Porto

- Primeira Liga: 1997–98, 1998–99
- Taça de Portugal: 1999–00, 2000–01
- Supertaça Cândido de Oliveira: 1999

Portugal

- FIFA U-20 World Cup: 1991
- UEFA European Under-16 Championship: 1989
- FIFA U-16 World Cup third place: 1989
- UEFA Under-18 Championship runner-up: 1990

Individual

- FIFA U-20 World Cup Golden Ball: 1991
