= Fernando Nélson =

Portuguese footballer

Personal information
- Full name: Fernando Nélson Jesus Vieira Alves
- Date of birth: 5 November 1971 (age 54)
- Place of birth: Porto, Portugal
- Height: 1.79 m (5 ft 10 in)
- Position: Right-back

Youth career
- 1983–1986: Porto
- 1987: Rio Tinto
- 1987–1990: Salgueiros

Senior career*
Years	Team	Apps	(Gls)
1990–1991	Salgueiros	23	(0)
1991–1996	Sporting CP	115	(2)
1996–1998	Aston Villa	60	(0)
1998–2002	Porto	32	(0)
1999–2002	Porto B	13	(1)
2002–2004	Vitória Setúbal	32	(1)
2004–2006	Rio Tinto		
Total		275	(4)

International career
1991	Portugal U20	4	(0)
1992–1994	Portugal U21	22	(0)
1995–2001	Portugal	10	(0)
Medal record
Men's football
Representing Portugal
FIFA U-20 World Cup
Winner	1991 Portugal
UEFA European Under-21 Championship
Runner-up	1994 France
- * Club domestic league appearances and goals

Fernando Nélson Jesus Vieira Alves (born 5 November 1971), known as Nélson, is a Portuguese former professional footballer who played as a right-back.

Best known for his spell at Sporting CP, he also played for Porto in his country, having a two-year stint at Aston Villa in England as well.

Nélson achieved Primeira Liga figures of 202 games and three goals over ten seasons.

== Club career ==
Nélson was born in Porto. After starting professionally at local S.C. Salgueiros, he signed for fellow Primeira Liga club Sporting CP immediately after having helped the Portugal under-20s to win the 1991 FIFA World Youth Championship, played in the country.

At the Lisbon-based side, Nélson won the 1995 Taça de Portugal. After three final solid seasons, where he made nearly 100 league appearances and scored two goals, he joined Aston Villa in summer 1996, under manager Brian Little.

After two Premier League campaigns in the Midlands and 75 games in all competitions, in July 1998 Nélson moved to FC Porto – his first youth club – winning his only national championship in his debut season. He would be irregularly used the following three years (playing as much as 20 matches and as little as none), and in 2002 agreed to a three-year contract with Vitória F.C. also in the top division.

Nélson retired after two seasons with amateurs S.C. Rio Tinto, later becoming their president.

== International career ==
Nélson won ten full caps for Portugal, making his debut on 3 June 1995 in a 3–2 home win against Latvia for the UEFA Euro 1996 qualifiers.

== Personal life ==
Nélson's twin brother, Albertino, was also a footballer and a defender. He too started his career – which spanned more than two decades, with teams in all levels of Portuguese football – with Porto (youth) and Salgueiros, and amassed top-tier totals of 204 games and one goal, mainly with C.S. Marítimo.

Nélson was a member of Opus Dei.

== Honours ==
Sporting CP

- Taça de Portugal: 1994–95
- Supertaça Cândido de Oliveira: 1995

Porto

- Primeira Liga: 1998–99
- Taça de Portugal: 1999–2000, 2000–01

Portugal U-20

- FIFA U-20 World Cup: 1991
