= Budimir Vujačić =

Montenegrin footballer

Personal information
- Date of birth: 4 January 1964 (age 62)
- Place of birth: Titograd, SFR Yugoslavia
- Height: 1.90 m (6 ft 3 in)
- Position: Defender

Senior career*
Years	Team	Apps	(Gls)
1982–1983	Petrovac		
1983–1985	Obilić		
1985–1987	SC Freiburg	76	(4)
1988–1989	Vojvodina	41	(8)
1989–1993	Partizan	115	(10)
1993–1997	Sporting CP	62	(7)
1997–1998	Vissel Kobe	14	(0)

International career
1989–1996	FR Yugoslavia (Note: Including 8 caps for SFR Yugoslavia.)	12	(0)
- * Club domestic league appearances and goals

Budimir Vujačić (born 4 January 1964) is a Montenegrin former professional footballer. Mainly a left-back, he could also operate as a centre-back.

== Club career ==
Born in Titograd, Montenegro, Socialist Federal Republic of Yugoslavia, Vujačić grew up in Petrovac na Moru, and began his football career with local outfit OFK Petrovac. In 1985, aged 21, he moved abroad, playing three solid seasons for SC Freiburg in the 2. Bundesliga.

In January 1988, Vujačić returned home and signed with FK Vojvodina. He was a member of the team that won the Yugoslav First League in 1989. In June 1989. he joined FK Partizan. At the Belgrade outfit, he was an everpresent defensive figure (also contributing with ten league goals during his spell), as the team won one cup and the first edition of the championship after the creation of Serbia and Montenegro, with Partizan leading second-placed neighbours Red Star by 14 points, whilst only conceding 20 goals in 36 matches.

Vujačić then joined Sporting CP, winning the Portuguese Cup in the only season in which he was a regular starter (29 matches, two goals). He retired from football in 1998 at the age of 34, after a short spell in Japan with Vissel Kobe.

== International career ==
Vujačić made his senior national team debut for SFR Yugoslavia on 27 May 1989, in a friendly match against Belgium (1–0 loss in Brussels) – he played the entire second half. He was later included to UEFA Euro 1992, but the nation would be suspended due to the Yugoslav Wars. In total, he gained a total of 12 caps (eight plus four for the newly created FR Yugoslavia), but did not attend any major international tournament. His final international was a December 1996 friendly match away against Argentina.

== Post-playing career ==
Following his retirement, Vujačić served as scout for Manchester United, and was responsible for bringing Nemanja Vidić, Zoran Tošić and Adem Ljajić to the club's attention.

== Career statistics ==
=== Club ===
Appearances and goals by club, season and competition
Club	Season	League		
Club	Season	Division	Apps	Goals
SC Freiburg	1985–86	2. Bundesliga	33	1
SC Freiburg	1986–87	2. Bundesliga	24	1
SC Freiburg	1987–88	2. Bundesliga	19	2
SC Freiburg	Total		76	4
Vojvodina	1987–88	Yugoslav First League	10	1
Vojvodina	1988–89	Yugoslav First League	31	7
Vojvodina	Total		41	8
Partizan	1989–90	Yugoslav First League	27	2
Partizan	1990–91	Yugoslav First League	33	3
Partizan	1991–92	Yugoslav First League	29	1
Partizan	1992–93	Serbian SuperLiga	26	4
Partizan	Total		115	10
Sporting CP	1993–94	Primeira Liga	16	2
Sporting CP	1994–95	Primeira Liga	28	2
Sporting CP	1995–96	Primeira Liga	17	3
Sporting CP	1996–97	Primeira Liga	1	0
Sporting CP	Total		62	7
Vissel Kobe	1997	J1 League	14	0
Vissel Kobe	1998	J1 League	0	0
Vissel Kobe	Total		14	0
Career total			308	29

=== International ===
Appearances and goals by national team and year
National team	Year	Apps	Goals
SFR Yugoslavia	1989	4	0
SFR Yugoslavia	1990	0	0
SFR Yugoslavia	1991	3	0
SFR Yugoslavia	1992	1	0
FR Yugoslavia	1993	0	0
FR Yugoslavia	1994	0	0
FR Yugoslavia	1995	2	0
FR Yugoslavia	1996	2	0
Total		12	0

== Honours ==
Sporting CP

- Taça de Portugal: 1995
- Supertaça Cândido de Oliveira: 1995
