= Ricardo Sá Pinto =

Portuguese football manager and former player (born 1972)

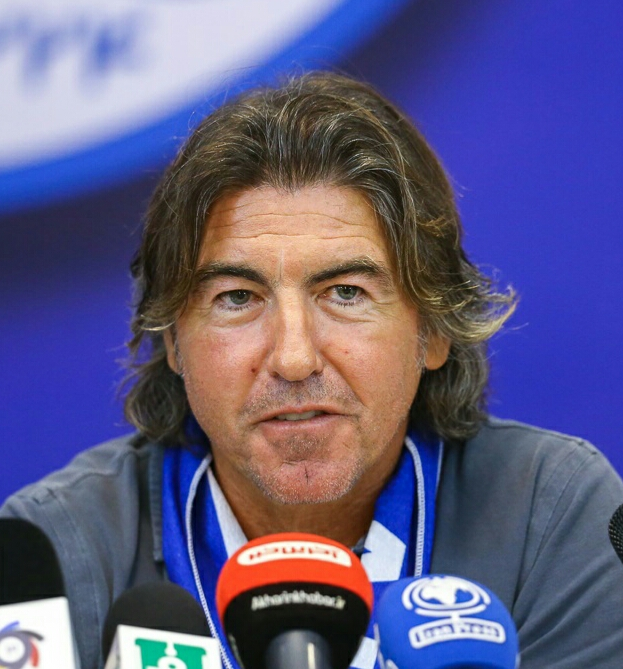
- Sá Pinto with Esteghlal in 2022

Personal information
- Full name: Ricardo Manuel Andrade da Silva Sá Pinto
- Date of birth: 10 October 1972 (age 54)
- Place of birth: Porto, Portugal
- Height: 1.78 m (5 ft 10 in)
- Position: Forward

Team information
- Current team: Pafos (manager)

Youth career
- 1982–1987: Porto
- 1987–1991: Salgueiros

Senior career*
Years	Team	Apps	(Gls)
1991–1994	Salgueiros	57	(17)
1994–1997	Sporting CP	77	(20)
1997–2000	Real Sociedad	70	(6)
2000–2006	Sporting CP	97	(14)
2006–2007	Standard Liège	21	(2)
Total		322	(59)

International career
1992–1994	Portugal U21	10	(0)
1994–2001	Portugal	45	(10)

Managerial career
- 2010–2011: União Leiria (assistant)
- 2012: Sporting CP
- 2013: Red Star
- 2013–2014: OFI
- 2014–2015: Atromitos
- 2015: Belenenses
- 2016: Al Fateh
- 2017: Atromitos
- 2017–2018: Standard Liège
- 2018–2019: Legia Warsaw
- 2019: Braga
- 2020: Vasco da Gama
- 2021: Gaziantep
- 2022: Moreirense
- 2022–2023: Esteghlal
- 2023–2024: APOEL
- 2024: Raja Casablanca
- 2025–2026: Esteghlal
- 2026–: Pafos
Medal record
Men's football
Representing Portugal
UEFA European Championship
Bronze medal – third place	2000 Belgium-Netherlands
UEFA European Under-21 Championship
Runner-up	1994 France
- * Club domestic league appearances and goals

Ricardo Manuel Andrade da Silva Sá Pinto (born 10 October 1972) is a Portuguese former professional footballer who played as a forward. He is the manager of Cypriot First Division club Pafos.

He was known for his fighting spirit, best displayed in his stints at Sporting CP, where he was dubbed "Ricardo Lionheart" by the club's fans. In a career cut short by injury and suspension, he appeared in 230 Primeira Liga games (scoring 51 goals), also playing for Real Sociedad in Spain for two years.

Sá Pinto represented the Portugal national team in two European Championships, reaching the semi-finals at Euro 2000. He started working as a manager with Sporting in 2012, and also worked in ten foreign countries.

== Club career ==
Born in Porto, Sá Pinto made his professional debut with local Salgueiros and soon represented the Portuguese under-21s, helping the side reach the 1994 UEFA European Championship final. He first appeared in the Primeira Liga with the former on 30 August 1992, coming on as a second-half substitute in a 2–0 away loss against Farense.

In the 1994–95 season, Sá Pinto joined Sporting CP. After some solid performances he attracted the attention of La Liga's Real Sociedad, signing a four-year contract in July 1997 for a fee of 400 million pesetas, but was issued with a year-long worldwide suspension before making his debut. He scored in his first official game for his new club, a 3–3 home draw with Real Oviedo on 30 August 1998.

After 70 matches and six goals in Spain, Sá Pinto returned to Sporting where he played six further years, troubled by many injuries, although he eventually gained team captaincy. In the 2006–07 campaign he joined fellow Portuguese international Sérgio Conceição at Standard Liège – with Jorge Costa having retired at the club in the summer – in the Belgian Pro League, and retired aged 34.

== International career ==
Sá Pinto received 45 caps for Portugal, 25 with Sporting and 20 for Real Sociedad, scoring ten times. His first game was on 7 September 1994 in a 2–1 win over Northern Ireland in Belfast, in which he netted the second goal. He played at UEFA Euro 1996, equalising against Denmark (1–1) in the group stage opener, and Euro 2000; he scored six times in qualification for the latter tournament, including a hat-trick in an 8–0 demolition of Liechtenstein in Coimbra on 9 June 1999.

On 26 March 1997, Sá Pinto assaulted national team coach Artur Jorge upon hearing the news of not having been picked up for a match. The player travelled to the Estádio Nacional in Lisbon where the team was practicing, and punched the manager in the face, being banned for one year from all national and international competitions.

Sá Pinto's last appearance was in the 6–0 victory over Cyprus for the 2002 FIFA World Cup qualifiers, on 6 June 2001. An injury prevented him from being present at the finals.

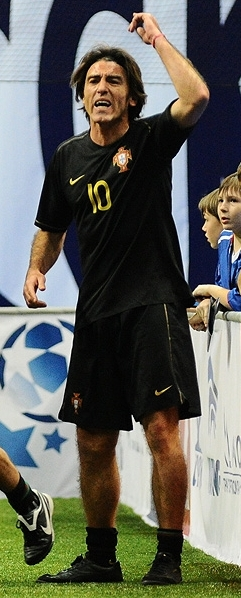
Sá Pinto with Portugal in the 2011 Legends Cup

== Coaching career ==
=== Early years (2009–2012) ===
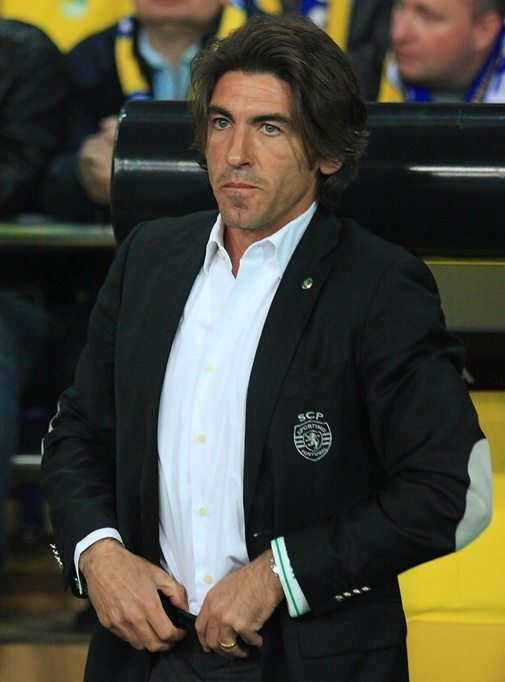
Sá Pinto as manager of Sporting CP in April 2012

In early November 2009, Sá Pinto returned to Sporting, replacing former teammate Pedro Barbosa as director of football as coach Paulo Bento was sacked following a string of poor performances/results. On 21 January 2010, following a physical confrontation with club player Liédson in the team's locker room after the 4–3 home win against Mafra in the Taça de Portugal, he immediately presented his resignation.

Sá Pinto had his first coaching experience in 2010, being named assistant at União de Leiria under Pedro Caixinha. On 13 February 2012, after a spell with Sporting under-19s, he was appointed first-team manager, replacing the fired Domingos Paciência.

On 25 May 2012, even though Sporting could only rank fourth in the league and lost the domestic cup final, Sá Pinto signed a new two-year contract with the Lions. On 4 October, however, following a 3–0 away loss to Videoton – led by former national teammate Paulo Sousa – in that season's UEFA Europa League, he was relieved of his duties.

=== Stints abroad (2013–2019) ===
Sá Pinto was appointed at Serbian giants Red Star Belgrade on 18 March 2013, winning the first eight SuperLiga matches in charge of the club but resigning his post on 19 June, in disagreement with its board of directors. From October 2013 to February 2015, he worked in the Super League Greece with OFI and Atromitos.

Sá Pinto returned to Portugal and its capital in June 2015, after agreeing to become Belenenses manager in replacement of Lito Vidigal, signing a two-year contract. On 15 December, however, after a 4–3 away defeat against Académica de Coimbra and failure to qualify from the Europa League group stage, he resigned from his position.

On 29 May 2016, Sá Pinto was appointed manager of Al Fateh. On 11 June 2017, after a second spell with Atromitos and even though he had agreed to a new deal after an eighth-place finish, he left for Standard Liège; in spite of initially underperforming in the Belgian League, he led his team to victory in the domestic cup in his first year as well as a final runner-up league position, but left on 20 May 2018.

In August 2018, Sá Pinto was announced as the new manager of Legia Warsaw after signing a three-year contract with the Ekstraklasa club. He was sacked the following April with the team in second, five points off Lechia Gdańsk with three games remaining.

=== Return to Portugal (2019–2022) ===
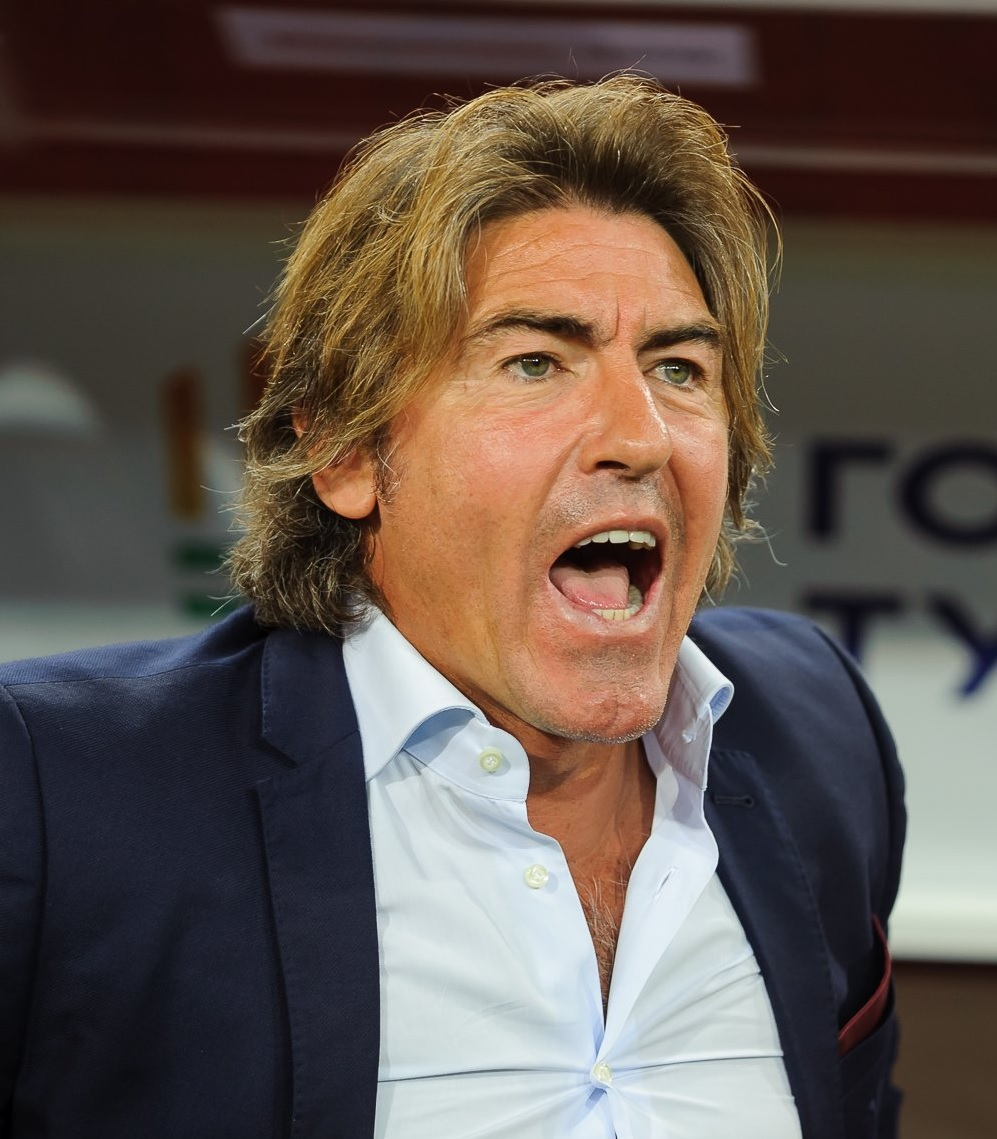
Sá Pinto with Braga in 2019

On 3 July 2019, Sá Pinto returned to his country for the first time in four years, taking over Braga on a two-year deal. He was dismissed on 23 December with the team eighth in the league, despite winning their Europa League group.

Sá Pinto was appointed at Campeonato Brasileiro Série A side Vasco da Gama on 13 October 2020, signing a contract until the end of the season. He was relieved of his duties on 29 December, with the side in the relegation zone.

On 20 January 2021, Sá Pinto agreed to a two-and-a-half-year deal at Gaziantep of the Turkish Süper Lig. He left in May at the end of his first campaign, criticising his players, the club president and his predecessor Marius Șumudică.

Sá Pinto became Moreirense's third coach of the season on 7 January 2022, following the dismissals of João Henriques and Vidigal. He led the team to 16th place after a 4–1 win over Vizela on the final day sent Tondela down instead, but was relegated in the promotion/relegation play-offs after a 2–1 aggregate loss to Chaves. He missed the play-offs after being issued with a 15-day suspension and €2,805 fine for provoking opposing fans after the Vizela game, and then called for his club's supporters to revolt against the local National Republican Guard captain; the force initiated criminal proceedings against him for this declaration. Days later, his contract was allowed to expire.

=== Esteghlal ===
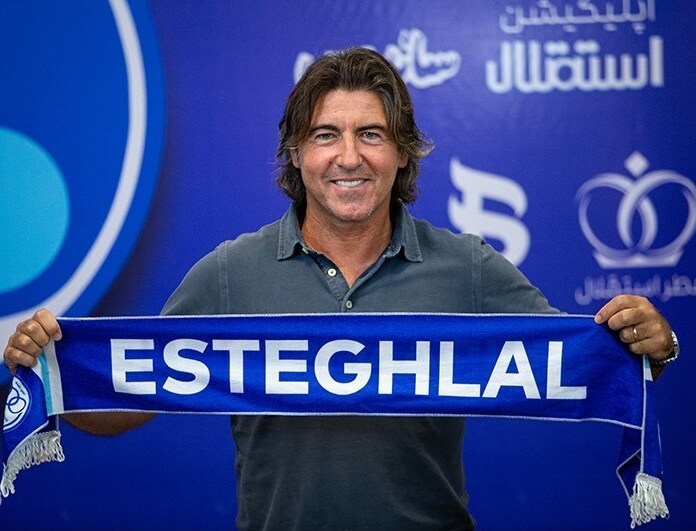
Sá Pinto in his introductory press conference as Esteghlal manager in June 2022

On 21 June 2022, Sá Pinto was appointed coach of Iranian club Esteghlal, signing a two-year contract. He won the domestic Supercup on 2 November after beating Nassaji Mazandaran 1–0, and dedicated the conquest to the "country's women and men who are suffering".

Sá Pinto eventually finished third in the Persian Gulf Pro League, and also reached the final of the Iranian Hazfi Cup where his side lost 2–1 to Persepolis and he was sent off. He was elected Manager of the Year with 54% of the votes.

=== APOEL ===
On 8 June 2023, Sá Pinto was confirmed as manager of APOEL in the Cypriot First Division; his assistants were José Dominguez (who worked with him at Gaziantep) and Nuno Morais (who played for over a decade at the Nicosia club). He won the national championship in his only season, with his team recording the best attack at 63 goals scored and defence at 24 conceded.

=== Raja CA ===
On 10 October 2024, Sá Pinto signed a one-year contract at Botola side Raja Casablanca. He was sacked two months later due to poor results.

=== Return to Esteghlal ===
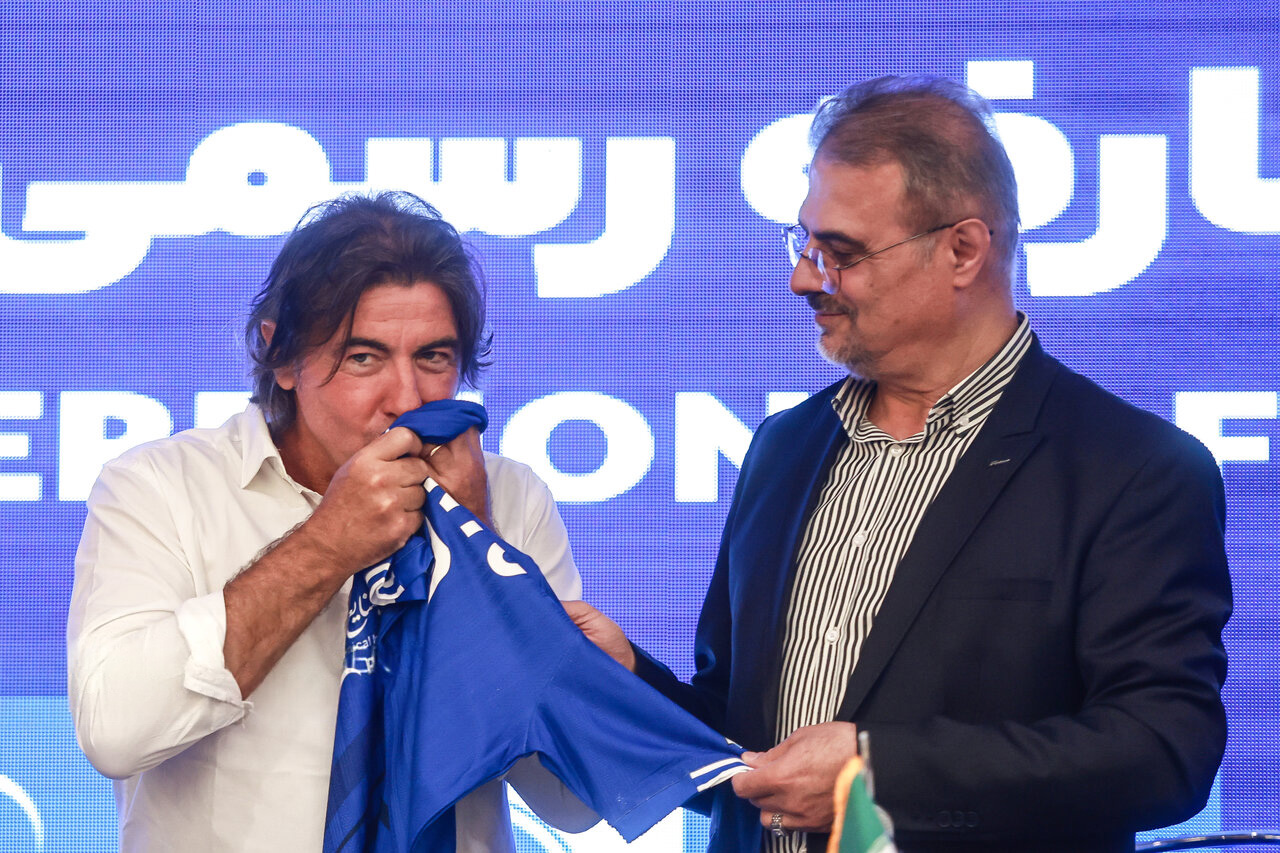
Sá Pinto on his return to Esteghlal, alongside the club's CEO Ali Nazari Juybari

On 23 June 2025, Sá Pinto returned to Esteghlal on a one-year contract. The following 20 February, even though his side was one point from first place with two games less, also having reached the round of 16 of the AFC Champions League Two, he was approached by the board of directors to negotiate an eventual departure, and chose to leave.

=== Pafos ===
Sá Pinto went back to Cyprus on 28 April 2026, being appointed at Pafos after Albert Celades was released. Shortly after arriving, he won the domestic cup after beating Apollon Limassol 2–0; thus, on 7 June, he agreed to a one-year extension.

== Career statistics ==
Sá Pinto: International goals
No.	Date	Venue	Opponent	Score	Result	Competition
1	9 June 1996	Hillsborough Stadium, Sheffield, England	Denmark	1–1	1–1	UEFA Euro 1996
2	6 September 1998	Puskás Ferenc Stadium, Budapest, Hungary	Hungary	1–1	1–3	Euro 2000 qualifying
3	6 September 1998	Puskás Ferenc Stadium, Budapest, Hungary	Hungary	1–2	1–3	Euro 2000 qualifying
4	26 March 1999	Estádio D. Afonso Henriques, Guimarães, Portugal	Azerbaijan	1–0	7–0	Euro 2000 qualifying
5	9 June 1999	Estádio Cidade de Coimbra, Coimbra, Portugal	Liechtenstein	1–0	8–0	Euro 2000 qualifying
6	9 June 1999	Estádio Cidade de Coimbra, Coimbra, Portugal	Liechtenstein	3–0	8–0	Euro 2000 qualifying
7	9 June 1999	Estádio Cidade de Coimbra, Coimbra, Portugal	Liechtenstein	4–0	8–0	Euro 2000 qualifying
8	23 February 2000	Stade du Pays de Charleroi, Charleroi, Belgium	Belgium	1–1	1–1	Friendly
9	2 June 2000	Estádio Municipal de Chaves, Chaves, Portugal	Wales	2–0	3–0	Friendly
10	3 September 2000	Kadrioru Stadium, Tallinn, Estonia	Estonia	0–3	1–3	2002 World Cup qualification

== Managerial statistics ==
As of match played 21 November 2026

Managerial record by team and tenure
Team	Nat	From	To	Record							
Team	Nat	From	To	G	W	D	L	GF	GA	GD	Win %
Sporting CP	(Portugal)	13 February 2012	4 October 2012	30	15	7	8	41	31	+10	50.00
Red Star	(Serbia)	19 March 2013	19 June 2013	11	8	0	3	17	9	+8	72.73
OFI	(Greece)	16 October 2013	25 May 2014	34	15	7	12	35	39	−4	44.12
Atromitos	(Greece)	25 September 2014	5 February 2015	19	5	9	5	20	20	+0	26.32
Belenenses	(Portugal)	9 June 2015	15 December 2015	26	8	8	10	25	42	−17	30.77
Al Fateh	(Saudi Arabia)	29 May 2016	23 September 2016	5	1	1	3	5	9	−4	20.00
Atromitos	(Greece)	5 February 2017	11 June 2017	13	5	2	6	11	12	−1	38.46
Standard Liège	(Belgium)	11 June 2017	20 May 2018	46	22	14	10	78	56	+22	47.83
Legia Warsaw	(Poland)	13 August 2018	1 April 2019	28	15	7	6	42	29	+13	53.57
Braga	(Portugal)	3 July 2019	23 December 2019	30	18	5	7	55	36	+19	60.00
Vasco da Gama	(Brazil)	14 October 2020	29 December 2020	15	3	6	6	10	19	−9	20.00
Gaziantep	(Turkey)	20 January 2021	17 May 2021	21	6	6	9	26	28	−2	28.57
Moreirense	(Portugal)	6 January 2022	1 June 2022	20	6	2	12	18	27	−9	30.00
Esteghlal	(Iran)	21 June 2022	7 June 2023	36	23	8	5	63	25	+38	63.89
APOEL	(Cyprus)	8 June 2023	14 May 2024	43	27	7	9	73	30	+43	62.79
Raja Casablanca	(Morocco)	10 October 2024	20 December 2024	11	2	6	3	8	9	−1	18.18
Esteghlal	(Iran)	23 June 2025	20 February 2026	31	12	11	8	39	33	+6	38.71
Pafos	(Cyprus)	29 April 2026	Present	26	11	8	7	40	30	+10	42.31
Total				445	202	114	129	606	484	+122	45.39

== Honours ==
=== Player ===
Sporting CP

- Primeira Liga: 2001–02
- Taça de Portugal: 1994–95, 2001–02
- Supertaça Cândido de Oliveira: 1995, 2000
- UEFA Cup runner-up: 2004–05

Portugal U-21

- UEFA European Under-21 Championship runner-up: 1994

=== Manager ===
Sporting CP

- Taça de Portugal runner-up: 2011–12

Standard Liège

- Belgian Cup: 2017–18

Esteghlal

- Iranian Super Cup: 2022
- Iranian Hazfi Cup runner-up: 2022–23

APOEL

- Cypriot First Division: 2023–24

Pafos

- Cypriot Cup: 2025–26
- Cypriot Super Cup: 2026
