= Marco Aurélio (footballer, born 1967) =

Brazilian footballer

Personal information
- Full name: Marco Aurélio Cunha dos Santos
- Date of birth: 18 February 1967 (age 59)
- Place of birth: Rio de Janeiro, Brazil
- Height: 1.86 m (6 ft 1 in)
- Position: Central defender

Senior career*
Years	Team	Apps	(Gls)
1984–1987	America-RJ		
1988–1990	Vasco da Gama	25	(0)
1990–1994	União da Madeira	127	(11)
1994–1999	Sporting CP	134	(3)
1999–2001	Vicenza	53	(1)
2001–2002	Palermo	32	(2)
2002–2003	Cosenza	28	(0)
2003–2004	SPAL	16	(0)
2004–2005	Teramo	39	(2)
2005–2006	SPAL	28	(1)
Total		482	(20)
- * Club domestic league appearances and goals

Marco Aurélio Cunha dos Santos (born 18 February 1967), known as Marco Aurélio or just M. Aurélio, is a Brazilian former footballer who played as a defender. He also holds Portuguese nationality after played over 8 seasons at Portugal.

He is known for his moustache and his performance at Sporting, nicknamed him "O Imperador".

== Career ==
Born in Rio de Janeiro, Marco Aurélio started his career at hometown club América. He then played two Campeonato Brasileiro Série A season for Vasco da Gama, also located at Rio de Janeiro. Before the start of 1990 Campeonato Brasileiro Série A and during the 1990 Campeonato Carioca, he left for União da Madeira of Portuguese Liga. Except 1992–93 season at Liga de Honra, he made 94 appearances at Portuguese top division. In 1994, he left for Sporting Clube de Portugal, which he won the cup and the super cup in 1995, under Carlos Queiroz. He partnered with Noureddine Naybet, and then Beto at the lion. In 1998–99 season, he had some argument with Mirko Jozić and partially the reason he left the club.

In January 1999, he left for Italian Serie A side Vicenza, made his league debut on 24 January, against Parma AC as starting XI. The match ended in 0–0 draw. He followed Vicenza relegated to Serie B in 1999, and in 2001 joined Serie B newcomer Palermo. He then left for Serie B struggler Cosenza, which went bankrupt at the end of 2002–03 Serie B season. He then left for Serie C1 side SPAL and in mid-season for Teramo, also at Serie C1 but in Group B.

In 2005, Marco Aurélio returned to SPAL, which newly re-found as SPAL 1907 at Serie C2 after the predecessor went bankrupt.

== Honours ==
Vasco da Gama

- Campeonato Brasileiro Série A: 1989

Sporting

- Supertaça Cândido de Oliveira: 1995 (rematch at April 1996)
- Taça de Portugal: 1995

Vicenza

- Serie B: 2000
