= Paulo Alves (footballer, born 1969) =

Portuguese football coach and former player

Personal information
- Full name: Paulo Lourenço Martins Alves
- Date of birth: 10 December 1969 (age 56)
- Place of birth: Vila Real, Portugal
- Height: 1.86 m (6 ft 1 in)
- Position: Centre-forward

Youth career
- 1982–1985: Abambres
- 1985–1986: Vila Real
- 1986–1988: Porto

Senior career*
Years	Team	Apps	(Gls)
1988–1991	Gil Vicente	68	(16)
1991–1992	Tirsense	33	(8)
1992–1993	Marítimo	22	(4)
1993	Braga	4	(0)
1993–1995	Marítimo	50	(16)
1995–1998	Sporting CP	68	(22)
1997–1998	→ West Ham United (loan)	4	(0)
1998–1999	Bastia	19	(3)
1999–2001	União Leiria	46	(8)
2001–2005	Gil Vicente	87	(26)
Total		401	(103)

International career
1989	Portugal U20	4	(1)
1989–1991	Portugal U21	9	(6)
1996	Portugal Olympic (O.P.)	6	(1)
1994–1996	Portugal	13	(7)

Managerial career
- 2006–2008: Gil Vicente
- 2008: União Leiria
- 2008–2009: Vizela
- 2009–2010: Portugal U20
- 2010–2013: Gil Vicente
- 2013–2014: Olhanense
- 2014–2015: Beira-Mar
- 2015: Nassaji Mazandaran
- 2015–2017: Penafiel
- 2017: União Madeira
- 2017–2018: Gil Vicente
- 2018–2019: Ohod
- 2019–2020: Varzim
- 2022–2023: Moreirense
- 2023–2024: Lugo
- 2025: Mafra
- 2025–2026: Al Batin
Medal record
Men's football
Representing Portugal
FIFA U-20 World Cup
Winner	1989 Saudi Arabia
- * Club domestic league appearances and goals

Paulo Lourenço Martins Alves CvIH (born 10 December 1969) is a Portuguese former professional footballer who played as a centre-forward, currently a manager.

He amassed Primeira Liga totals of 301 matches and 78 goals over 13 seasons, mainly with Gil Vicente (five years). He also represented in the competition Marítimo, Sporting CP (three apiece) União de Leiria (two) and Braga. Internationally, he won the FIFA World Youth Championship in 1989 and was part of the Olympic team that came fourth in 1996, also being a senior international in the mid-1990s.

Alves started coaching in 2005, and went on to be in charge of several clubs, including Gil (in several spells). He managed them and Olhanense in the top-flight, and nine teams in the second tier, winning the latter with Gil and Moreirense.

== Club career ==
Born in Vila Real, Alves moved from local club S.C. Vila Real to FC Porto's youth ranks at 17, but was unsuccessful there, moving to Gil Vicente FC. After spells with F.C. Tirsense, C.S. Marítimo (twice) and S.C. Braga, Alves joined Primeira Liga giants Sporting CP, being relatively used during his three-year stay. He also played in England with West Ham United on loan, but managed just four substitute appearances in a three-month spell. Upon his return to Lisbon, he notably scored a hat-trick in a 5–3 win at S.C. Campomaiorense.

In the summer of 1998, Alves signed a three-year deal at SC Bastia in the French Ligue 1, for a fee of €400,000. He scored on his debut as a late replacement in a 3–0 home victory over FC Metz, but added only two more goals in his one year in Corsica. He then spent two seasons with U.D. Leiria, netting six times in 27 matches in 2000–01 to help the club to its best-ever finish in the top flight, a fifth position. His second stint at Gil Vicente saw him finish as team top scorer for the 2001–02 campaign, with 11 goals from 27 appearances.

Alves retired in June 2005, at the age of 35.

== International career ==
Alves helped Portugal win the 1989 FIFA World Youth Championship in Saudi Arabia – in the group stage opener against Czechoslovakia, he scored a last-minute header (his strongest asset) for the game's only goal. Later in his career he also managed 13 caps for the full side, scoring seven times, mostly during the UEFA Euro 1996 qualifying stage and friendlies within that period. His first goals came as a brace as a substitute on 18 December 1994 in an 8–0 qualifying win over Liechtenstein, and three more the following 15 August in a 7–0 victory in the reverse fixture, again off the bench.

At the 1996 Summer Olympics in the United States, Alves helped his team finish fourth in the football event. He scored to open a 1–1 draw with the hosts in the final group game at the Robert F. Kennedy Memorial Stadium.

== Coaching career ==
Alves took up coaching immediately after retiring, precisely with the Barcelos club. In 2008 he joined another team he played for, Leiria, also in the Segunda Liga.

Due to poor results in the 2008–09 season, Alves was sacked by União de Leiria, but stayed in that league by moving to F.C. Vizela. In the following summer he rejoined former Sporting teammate Oceano's coaching staff at the Portugal under-21 side, while also being charged with the under-20s; after a handful of games he resigned and returned to Gil Vicente, winning the 2011 second-division championship with the subsequent promotion.

After three years, which also brought a runner-up place in the Taça da Liga, Alves replaced former national teammate Abel Xavier at the helm of S.C. Olhanense early into the 2013–14 campaign, being dismissed after less than three months in charge and with only one point won in six league matches.

Alves returned to management in December 2014, taking the helm at S.C. Beira-Mar, 14th in the second tier. The team suffered with serious financial problems over the season, and were sent to the Aveiro Football Association's second division as a punishment.

On 3 December 2015, Alves was appointed at F.C. Penafiel until the end of the division two season, having been working in Iran for F.C. Nassaji Mazandaran. He remained in the job until being hired by C.F. União for 2017–18, being relieved of his duties on 2 October with the side placed 12th. He returned to Gil Vicente halfway through the campaign, and left on 23 February 2018 by mutual agreement having not won any of his seven fixtures.

After a few months back in the Middle East with Ohod Club of Saudi Arabia, Alves returned to the Portuguese second tier in June 2019, at Varzim SC. He was dismissed on 18 October 2020, after three consecutive defeats in a five-game winless run.

On 8 June 2022, Alves was hired by newly relegated Moreirense FC. He helped the club through their League Cup group, at the expense of national leaders S.L. Benfica on goals scored. He also won the second tier, confirming it with a 4–2 away victory over second-placed C.F. Estrela da Amadora. After achieving this, he left the Parque de Jogos Comendador Joaquim de Almeida Freitas.

On 22 December 2023, Alves was appointed as manager of Primera Federación club CD Lugo. He was sacked less than two months later, continuing his career at C.D. Mafra (Portuguese second division) and Al Batin FC (Saudi First Division League).

== Career statistics ==
=== International goals ===
Paulo Alves: International goals
No.	Date	Venue	Opponent	Score	Result	Competition
1	18 December 1994	Estádio da Luz (1954), Lisboa, Portugal	Liechtenstein	7–0	8–0	Euro 1996 qualifying
2	18 December 1994	Estádio da Luz (1954), Lisboa, Portugal	Liechtenstein	8–0	8–0	Euro 1996 qualifying
3	29 January 1995	Rogers Centre, Toronto, Canada	Denmark	1–0	1–0	SkyDome Cup
4	15 August 1995	Sportpark Eschen-Mauren, Eschen, Liechtenstein	Liechtenstein	0–4	0–7	Euro 1996 qualifying
5	15 August 1995	Sportpark Eschen-Mauren, Eschen, Liechtenstein	Liechtenstein	0–5	0–7	Euro 1996 qualifying
6	15 August 1995	Sportpark Eschen-Mauren, Eschen, Liechtenstein	Liechtenstein	0–7	0–7	Euro 1996 qualifying
7	12 December 1995	Wembley Stadium (1923), London, England	England	1–1	1–1	Friendly

== Managerial statistics ==
As of 15 May 2025

Managerial record by team and tenure
Team	Nat	From	To	Record								Ref
Team	Nat	From	To	G	W	D	L	GF	GA	GD	Win %	Ref
Gil Vicente	(Portugal)	8 March 2006	20 May 2008	75	32	25	18	91	75	+16	42.67	
União Leiria	(Portugal)	20 May 2008	9 November 2008	13	4	5	4	11	10	+1	30.77	
Vizela	(Portugal)	2 December 2008	25 May 2009	21	4	14	3	20	20	+0	19.05	
Portugal U20	(Portugal)	24 June 2009	4 March 2010	2	0	1	1	3	4	−1	0.00	
Gil Vicente	(Portugal)	4 March 2010	21 May 2013	123	42	38	43	165	175	−10	34.15	
Olhanense	(Portugal)	29 October 2013	7 January 2014	8	0	2	6	6	18	−12	0.00	
Beira-Mar	(Portugal)	27 December 2014	30 June 2015	26	8	11	7	25	21	+4	30.77	
Nassaji Mazandaran	(Iran)	1 July 2015	11 September 2015	5	1	2	2	3	5	−2	20.00	
Penafiel	(Portugal)	4 December 2015	30 June 2017	77	29	27	21	95	83	+12	37.66	
União Madeira	(Portugal)	1 July 2017	2 October 2017	12	4	5	3	15	11	+4	33.33	
Gil Vicente	(Portugal)	28 December 2017	23 February 2018	7	0	3	4	0	8	−8	0.00	
Ohod	(Saudi Arabia)	27 November 2018	19 January 2019	8	1	0	7	4	16	−12	12.50	
Varzim	(Portugal)	8 June 2019	18 October 2020	36	15	10	11	41	40	+1	41.67	
Moreirense	(Portugal)	8 June 2022	28 May 2023	41	28	8	5	92	47	+45	68.29	
Lugo	(Spain)	22 December 2023	19 February 2024	8	2	2	4	5	9	−4	25.00	
Mafra	(Portugal)	4 February 2025	19 May 2025	14	3	2	9	12	26	−14	21.43	
Total				476	173	155	148	588	568	+20	36.34	—

== Honours ==
=== Player ===
Sporting CP

- Supertaça Cândido de Oliveira: 1995

Portugal

- FIFA U-20 World Cup: 1989

=== Manager ===
Gil Vicente

- Liga de Honra: 2010–11
- Taça da Liga runner-up: 2011–12

Moreirense

- Liga Portugal 2: 2022–23

Individual

- Liga Portugal 2 Manager of the Season: 2022–23
- Liga Portugal 2 Manager of the Month: August 2022, September 2022, March 2023
