= Octávio Machado =

Portuguese football coach and former player

Personal information
- Full name: Octávio Joaquim Coelho Machado
- Date of birth: 6 May 1949 (age 77)
- Place of birth: Palmela, Portugal
- Height: 1.75 m (5 ft 9 in)
- Position: Defensive midfielder

Youth career
- 1963–1968: Palmelense

Senior career*
Years	Team	Apps	(Gls)
1968–1975	Vitória Setúbal	146	(16)
1975–1980	Porto	84	(8)
1980–1983	Vitória Setúbal	77	(1)
Total		307	(25)

International career
1971–1977	Portugal	20	(1)

Managerial career
- 1983–1984: Salgueiros
- 1984–1992: Porto (assistant)
- 1996–1997: Sporting CP
- 2001–2002: Porto
- * Club domestic league appearances and goals

Octávio Joaquim Coelho Machado (born 6 May 1949) is a Portuguese former football defensive midfielder and manager.

== Club career ==
Born in Palmela, Setúbal District, Machado was a leading player for Vitória de Setúbal and FC Porto during the 1970s, winning two Primeira Liga titles with the latter even though he missed the entire 1978–79 due to injury. Over the course of 15 top-division seasons, he achieved totals of 307 games and 25 goals; with the latter side, he was also involved in an internal dispute which resulted in the departure of 15 players, along with manager José Maria Pedroto and director of football Jorge Nuno Pinto da Costa.

After retiring at the age of 34 with his first club, Machado went on to become an assistant manager to Artur Jorge, joining his Porto staff for the 1984–85 campaign. There, he won two leagues in a row and the 1987 European Cup, remaining alongside Jorge into the 1990s when he finally became a head coach, managing both Porto and Sporting CP.

== International career ==
Machado earned 20 caps for the Portugal national team, scoring once. His first appearance was on 21 November 1971, in a 1–1 draw with Belgium for the UEFA Euro 1972 qualifiers.

Machado's last international was against Poland on 29 October 1977 in the 1978 FIFA World Cup qualifying campaign, a 1–1 draw.

Octávio Machado: International goals
No.	Date	Venue	Opponent	Score	Result	Competition
1	9 October 1977	Idrætsparken, Copenhagen, Denmark	Denmark	1–4	2–4	1978 World Cup qualification

== Post-retirement ==
After retiring from football, Machado started a private business activity in agriculture, and was involved in local politics in his hometown of Palmela.

== Honours ==
=== Player ===
Vitória Setúbal

- Taça de Portugal runner-up: 1972–73

Porto

- Primeira Liga: 1977–78
- Taça de Portugal: 1976–77; runner-up: 1977–78, 1979–80

=== Manager ===
Sporting CP

- Supertaça Cândido de Oliveira: 1995
- Taça de Portugal runner-up: 1995–96

Porto

- Supertaça Cândido de Oliveira: 2001
