= Ivaylo Yordanov =

Bulgarian footballer

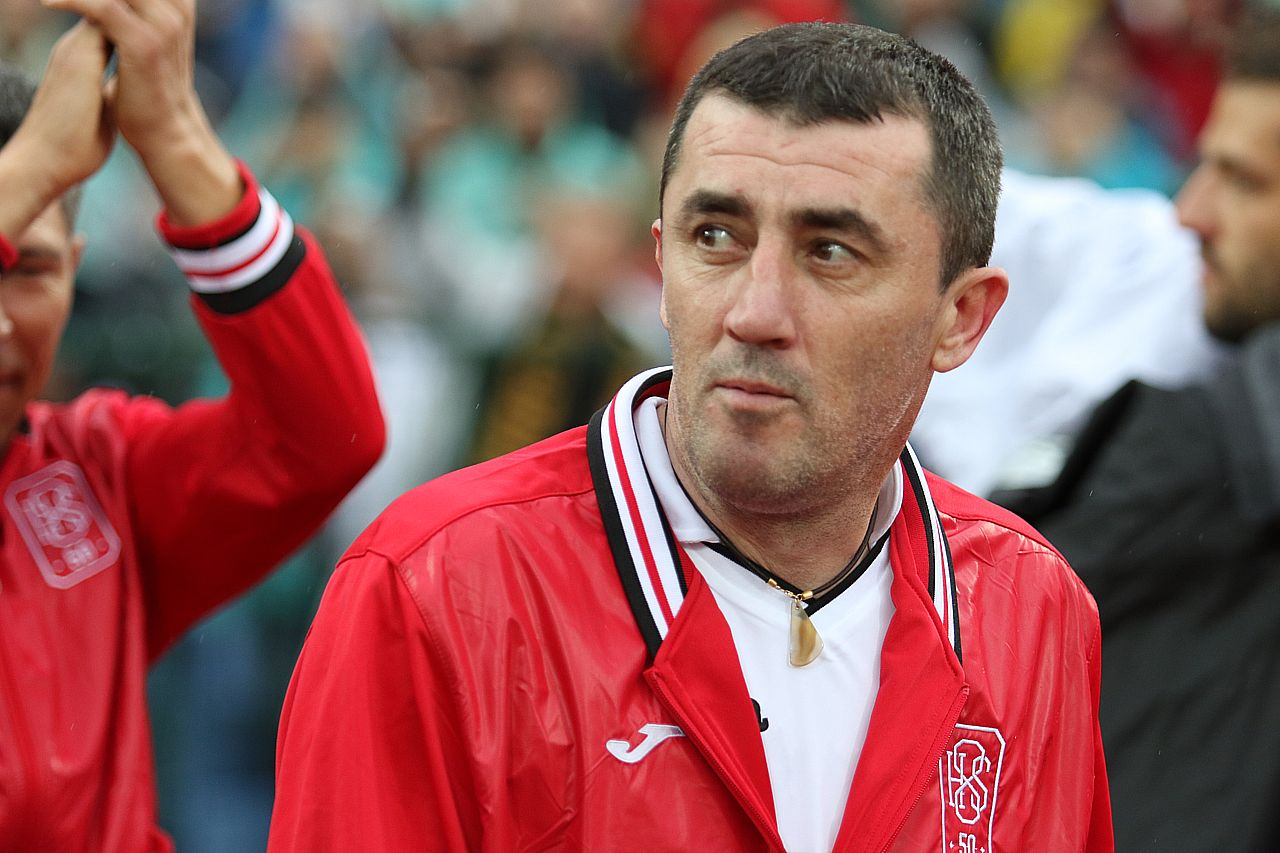
- Yordanov in 2016

Personal information
- Full name: Ivaylo Stoimenov Yordanov
- Date of birth: 22 April 1968 (age 58)
- Place of birth: Samokov, Bulgaria
- Height: 1.80 m (5 ft 11 in)
- Positions: Striker; midfielder

Senior career*
Years	Team	Apps	(Gls)
1982–1989	Rilski Sportist	199	(23)
1989–1991	Lokomotiv Gorna Oryahovitsa	51	(23)
1991–2001	Sporting CP	184	(56)
Total		434	(102)

International career
1991–2000	Bulgaria	51	(4)

Managerial career
- 2001–2002: Sporting B (assistant)
- 2004–2005: Bulgaria (assistant)
- 2010: Litex Lovech (assistant)
- 2016: Beroe (assistant)
- 2019–2025: Bulgaria U21 (assistant)
- 2025–2026: Bulgaria (assistant)
- * Club domestic league appearances and goals

Ivaylo Stoimenov Yordanov (Bulgarian: Ивайло Стоименов Йорданов; born 22 April 1968) is a Bulgarian retired professional footballer who played mainly as a striker.

During his career, he represented mainly Sporting in Portugal, appearing in more than 250 official games in one full decade and winning two major titles.

A Bulgaria international for nine years, Yordanov represented the nation in two World Cups and Euro 1996.

== Club career ==
Born in Samokov, Yordanov began his career at local Rilski Sportist, where he first appeared professionally at not yet 15, moving to Lokomotiv Gorna Oryahovitsa in 1989. In the last of his two seasons, he topped the First Professional Football League scoring charts, at 21 goals, helping lowly Lokomotiv to a comfortable ninth place.

In 1991–92, Yordanov joined Sporting CP, signing alongside compatriot Boncho Genchev – who had been his predecessor at Lokomotiv GO – where he would play in a variety of positions (including central defender, due to injuries to teammates).

Persistent injury problems and the 1997 diagnosis of multiple sclerosis led to a 2001 retirement, still with the Lisbon club (he contributed with 11 matches and one goal in the team's Primeira Liga conquest the previous year).

== International career ==
Yordanov made his debut for the Bulgaria national team on 28 May 1991 in a friendly against Brazil. He went on to make 51 appearances and score 4 goals for the national team through 2000. At the FIFA World Cup, he participated in the 1994 FIFA World Cup and 1998 FIFA World Cup, making a total of seven appearances.

At the 1994 FIFA World Cup, he made five appearances and contributed to Bulgaria's run to the semi-finals. In particular, he played as a centre-back in the round-of-16 match against Mexico, as Trifon Ivanov was suspended due to accumulated yellow cards and Nikolay Iliev was absent through injury. The use of Yordanov, a forward, as a defender demonstrated his versatility, as he was capable of playing in several positions. In the match, he assisted Hristo Stoichkov's equaliser. The match ended 1–1 before Bulgaria won on penalties.

Bulgaria subsequently advanced to the semi-finals after defeating Germany 2–1 in the quarter-finals. Yordanov also played in the quarter-final against Germany, the semi-final against Italy, and the third-place play-off against Sweden. Bulgaria lost 2–1 to Italy and subsequently lost the third-place play-off to Sweden, finishing fourth in the tournament.

Yordanov also represented Bulgaria at UEFA Euro 1996. He played in all three of Bulgaria's group-stage matches against Spain, Romania, and France, completing the full 90 minutes in two of them. Bulgaria defeated Romania 1–0, but drew with Spain and lost to France, finishing third in the group.

At the 1998 FIFA World Cup, he played in two matches. He played the full 90 minutes in Bulgaria's opening group-stage match against Paraguay, while he remained on the substitutes' bench and did not play against Nigeria. He then started and played the full match against Spain. Bulgaria drew 0–0 with Paraguay before losing to Nigeria and Spain and being eliminated in the group stage. Yordanov made a total of seven appearances across the two World Cups, experiencing a fourth-place finish with Bulgaria at the 1994 tournament and a group-stage elimination in 1998.

== Post-playing career ==
Upon retiring, Yordanov stayed connected with Sporting CP, in its youth teams. On 7 June 2010, he joined Angel Chervenkov's staff at Litex Lovech, as part of the scouting departments.

In 2017, Yordanov took up the role of director of football at his former club Lokomotiv Gorna Oryahovitsa.

== Career statistics ==
Scores and results list Bulgaria's goal tally first, score column indicates score after each Yordanov goal.

List of international goals scored by Ivaylo Yordanov
No.	Date	Venue	Opponent	Score	Result	Competition
1	2 June 1996	Vasil Levski National Stadium, Sofia, Bulgaria	United Arab Emirates	1–0	4–1	Friendly match
2	2 April 1997	Vasil Levski National Stadium, Sofia, Bulgaria	Cyprus	4–1	4–1	1998 World Cup qualifier
3	5 June 1998	Vasil Levski National Stadium, Sofia, Bulgaria	Algeria	2–0	2–0	Friendly match
4	31 March 1999	Stade Josy Barthel, Luxembourg City, Luxembourg	Luxembourg	2–0	2–0	Euro 2000 qualifier

== Honours ==
Sporting

- Primeira Liga: 1999–2000
- Taça de Portugal: 1994–95
- Supertaça Cândido de Oliveira: 1995
