= 1994–95 Taça de Portugal =

Tournament details
- Country: Portugal
- Dates: September 1994 – 10 June 1995

Final positions
- Champions: Sporting CP (23rd title)
- Runners-up: Marítimo

Tournament statistics
- Top goal scorer(s): Domingos; Ivaylo Yordanov; Luís Figo (4 goals)

The 1994–95 Taça de Portugal was the 56th edition of the Portuguese football knockout tournament, organized by the Portuguese Football Federation (FPF). The 1994–95 Taça de Portugal began in September 1994. The final was played on 10 June 1995 at the Estádio Nacional.

Porto were the previous holders, having defeated Sporting CP 2–1 in a replay in the previous season's final. Sporting CP defeated Marítimo, 2–0 in the final to win their twelfth Taça de Portugal. As a result of Sporting CP winning the domestic cup competition, the Leões faced 1994–95 Primeira Divisão winners Porto in the 1995 Supertaça Cândido de Oliveira.

== Fifth Round ==
Ties were played between the 22–23 December.

Farense (I)	3–1	Felgueiras (II)	Estádio de São Luís, Faro

Vitória de Setúbal (I)	4–0	Torres Novas (III)	Estádio do Bonfim, Setúbal

Maia (III)	1–2	Leça (II)	Estádio Municipal Dr. José Vieira de Carvalho, Maia

Vitória de Guimarães (I)	1–2	Louletano (III)	Estádio D. Afonso Henriques, Guimarães
Tlemçani		Paulo Jorge

União de Lamas (II)	1–1 (a.e.t.)	Famalicão (II)	Comendador Henrique Amorim, Santa Maria de Lamas

Amora (II)	2–1	Torreense (II)	Estádio da Medideira, Amora

Feirense (II)	1–3	Braga (I)	Estádio Marcolino de Castro, Santa Maria da Feira

Olivais e Moscavide (III)	4–1	Freamunde (III)	Estádio Alfredo Marques Augusto, Lisbon

Ovarense (II)	1–0	Salgueiros (I)	Estádio Marques da Silva, Ovar

O Elvas (III)	1–1 (a.e.t.)	Rio Ave (II)	Campo Domingos Carrilho Patalino, Portalegre

22 December 1994	Benfica (I)	3–0	Tirsense (I)	Estádio da Luz, Lisbon
	Caniggia 7', 84'; Edílson 25'			Referee: Juvenal Silvestre

23 December 1994	Académico de Viseu (III)	1–0	Académica de Coimbra (II)	Estádio do Fontelo, Viseu
15:00 WET

23 December 1994	Boavista (I)	0–0 (a.e.t.)	Sporting CP (I)	Estádio do Bessa, Porto
				Referee: Bento Marques

23 December 1994	Porto (I)	5–0	União de Leiria (I)	Estádio das Antas, Porto
	Zé Carlos 20'; Barros 49', 60'; P. Santos 52'; Domingos 82'			Referee: Augusto Duarte

Replay	Famalicão (II)	2–1	União de Lamas (II)	Estádio Municipal 22 de Junho, Vila Nova de Famalicão

Replay	Rio Ave (II)	2–0	O Elvas (III)	Estádio dos Arcos, Vila do Conde

11 January 1995 Replay	Sporting CP (I)	5–0	Boavista (I)	Estádio José Alvalade, Lisbon
	Juskowiak 4', 16', 38'; Yordanov 68', 87'			Referee: Carlos Calheiros

== Sixth Round ==
Ties were played on the 15 February. Due to the odd number of teams involved at this stage of the competition, Sporting CP qualified for the quarter-finals due to having no opponent to face at this stage of the competition.

15 February 1995	Académico de Viseu (III)	0–1	Vitória de Setúbal (I)	Estádio do Fontelo, Viseu

15 February 1995	Benfica (I)	3–1	Famalicão (II)	Estádio da Luz, Lisbon
	Edílson 4', 74'; Tavares 5'		Honi 78'	Referee: Adrelino Pena

15 February 1995	Leça (II)	1–0	Farense (I)	Estádio do Leça FC, Leça da Palmeira

15 February 1995	Marítimo (I)	2–1	Amora (II)	Estádio dos Barreiros, Funchal

15 February 1995	Olivais e Moscavide (III)	1–0	Braga (I)	Estádio Alfredo Marques Augusto, Lisbon

15 February 1995	Ovarense (II)	2–0	Rio Ave (II)	Estádio Marques da Silva, Ovar

15 February 1995	Porto (I)	3–0	Louletano (III)	Estádio das Antas, Porto
	Baroni 10', 50'; J. Costa 39'			Referee: Manuel Sineiro

== Quarter-finals ==
Ties were played on the 29 March, whilst replays were played on the 12 April.

29 March 1995	Benfica (I)	0–0 (a.e.t.)	Vitória de Setúbal (I)	Estádio da Luz, Lisbon
				Referee: José Rufino

29 March 1995	Leça (II)	0–4	Porto (I)	Estádio do Leça FC, Leça da Palmeira
			Barros 32'; Domingos 41', 55'; Latapy 50'	Referee: Lourenço Ferreira

29 March 1995	Marítimo (I)	2–1	Ovarense (II)	Estádio dos Barreiros, Funchal

29 March 1995	Olivais e Moscavide (III)	1–6	Sporting CP (I)	Estádio Alfredo Marques Augusto, Lisbon
	Sequeira 51'		Vujačić 11'; Capucho 42', 50', 88'; Figo 82', 86'	Referee: António Marçal

12 April 1995 Replay	Vitória de Setúbal (I)	2–0	Benfica (I)	Estádio do Bonfim, Setúbal
	Araújo 67', 89'			Referee: Lourenço Ferreira

== Semi-finals ==
Ties were played on 9 May.

9 May 1995	Marítimo (I)	1–0	Porto (I)	Estádio dos Barreiros, Funchal
	Bunbury 21'

9 May 1995	Sporting CP (I)	3–0	Vitória de Setúbal (I)	Estádio José Alvalade, Lisbon
	Figo 4', 53'; Amuneke 48'

== Final ==
10 June 1995
17:00 CEST

Marítimo	0–2	Sporting CP
		Yordanov 10', 86'

Estádio Nacional, Oeiras
Referee: Bento Marques (Lisbon)
