= 1999–2000 FC Porto season =

FC Porto
1999–2000 season
- Head coach: Fernando Santos
- Stadium: Estádio das Antas
- Primeira Liga: 2nd
- Taça de Portugal: Winners
- Supertaça Cândido de Oliveira: Winners
- UEFA Champions League: Quarter-finals
- Top goalscorer: League: Mário Jardel (37); All: Mário Jardel (55)
Home colours	Away colours

This article shows the statistics of FC Porto in the competitions and matches played during the 1999–2000 season.

== Season summary ==
FC Porto reached the UEFA Champions League quarter-final.

== Kit ==
Porto's kit was manufactured by Italian kit manufacturer Kappa and sponsored by Portuguese ceramics producer Revigrés.

== First team squad ==
Note: Flags indicate national team as defined under FIFA eligibility rules; some limited exceptions apply. Players may hold more than one non-FIFA nationality.

No.	Pos.	Nation	Player
1	GK	POR	Rui Correia
2	DF	POR	Jorge Costa (captain)
3	DF	BRA	Rubens Júnior
4	DF	BRA	Aloísio
5	DF	BRA	Argel
6	MF	POR	Emílio Peixe
7	DF	POR	Carlos Secretário
8	MF	POR	Rui Barros
9	FW	POR	Domingos
10	MF	POR	Ricardo Sousa
11	MF	YUG	Ljubinko Drulović
14	MF	POR	Rodolfo
15	FW	HUN	Miklós Fehér
16	FW	BRA	Mário Jardel
17	FW	BRA	Alessandro Cambalhota

No.	Pos.	Nation	Player
18	MF	POR	Carlos Chaínho
20	MF	POR	Paulinho Santos
21	MF	POR	Capucho
24	GK	POR	Hilário
26	FW	BRA	Duda
27	FW	POR	Romeu Almeida
28	FW	BRA	Clayton
29	MF	BRA	Deco
30	DF	BRA	Esquerdinha
32	MF	POR	António Folha
33	DF	POR	Ricardo Silva
45	DF	POR	Tonel
59	DF	POR	Fernando Nélson
99	GK	POR	Vítor Baía

== Results ==
=== Supertaça Cândido de Oliveira ===
7 August 1999 First leg	Beira-Mar	1–2	Porto	Estádio Mário Duarte, Aveiro
	Faye 65'		Domingos 66'; Esquerdinha 73'	Referee: Jorge Coroado (Lisbon)

15 August 1999 Second leg	Porto	3–1	Beira-Mar	Estádio das Antas, Porto
	Jardel 6', 81'; Lobão 86' (o.g.)		Óscar 28'	Referee: Isidoro Rodrigues (Viseu)

=== Primeira Liga ===
==== League table ====
Pos	Team	Pld	W	D	L	GF	GA	GD	Pts	Qualification or relegation
1	Sporting CP (C)	34	23	8	3	57	22	+35	77	Qualification to Champions League group stage
2	Porto	34	22	7	5	66	26	+40	73	Qualification to Champions League third qualifying round
3	Benfica	34	21	6	7	58	33	+25	69	Qualification to UEFA Cup first round
4	Boavista	34	16	7	11	40	31	+9	55	Qualification to UEFA Cup qualifying round
5	Gil Vicente	34	14	11	9	48	34	+14	53	

Source: Infordesporto
Rules for classification: 1) points; 2) head-to-head points; 3) head-to-head goal difference; 4) goal difference; 5) number of goals scored
(C) Champions

=== Taça de Portugal ===
==== Knockout stage ====
14 November 1999 Fourth round	Ribeira Brava	0–4	Porto	Centro Desportivo da Madeira, Ribeira Brava
			Deco 26', 58'; Duda 35'; António Folha 68'

12 January 2000 Fifth round	Porto	4–1	Braga	Estádio das Antas, Porto
	Chaínho 29'; Jardel 39'; Clayton 82', 88'		Barroso 45'	Referee: Francisco Ferreira

9 February 2000 Quarter-finals	Porto	3–0	Fafe	Estádio das Antas, Porto
	Jardel 21', 44' (pen.), 78' (pen.)			Referee: Duarte Gomes

12 April 2000 Semi-finals	Porto	3–0	Rio Ave	Estádio das Antas, Porto
	Domingos 19'; Jardel 28'; R. Silva 30'			Referee: Jorge Coroado

==== Final ====
21 May 2000 Final	Porto	1–1 (a.e.t.)	Sporting CP	Estádio Nacional, Oeiras
17:00 WEST	Jardel 4'		Barbosa 56'	Referee: António Costa (Porto)

25 May 2000 Final Replay	Porto	2–0	Sporting CP	Estádio Nacional, Oeiras
20:30 WEST	Clayton 47'; Deco 74'			Referee: Lucílio Batista (Lisbon)

=== UEFA Champions League ===
==== First group stage ====
Pos	Team	Pld	W	D	L	GF	GA	GD	Pts	Qualification
1	(Spain) Real Madrid	6	4	1	1	15	7	+8	13	Advance to second group stage
2	(Portugal) Porto	6	4	0	2	9	6	+3	12	Advance to second group stage
3	(Greece) Olympiacos	6	2	1	3	9	12	−3	7	Transfer to UEFA Cup
4	(Norway) Molde	6	1	0	5	6	14	−8	3	

Source: UEFA

15 September 1999 1	Molde (Norway)	0–1	(Portugal) Porto	Molde Stadium, Molde
20:45		Report	Deco 89'	Attendance: 8,739; Referee: Alain Hamer (Luxembourg)

21 September 1999 2	Porto (Portugal)	2–0	(Greece) Olympiacos	Estádio das Antas, Porto
19:45	Esquerdinha 6'; Jardel 47'	Report		Attendance: 21,500; Referee: David Elleray (England)

28 September 1999 3	Real Madrid (Spain)	3–1	(Portugal) Porto	Santiago Bernabéu Stadium, Madrid
20:45	Morientes 23'; Helguera 37'; Hierro 68' (pen.)	Report	Jardel 24'	Attendance: 41,000; Referee: Pierluigi Collina (Italy)

20 October 1999 4	Porto (Portugal)	2–1	(Spain) Real Madrid	Estádio das Antas, Porto
19:45	Jardel 13', 35'	Report	Peixe 68' (o.g.)	Attendance: 46,550; Referee: Bernd Heynemann (Germany)

26 October 1999 5	Porto (Portugal)	3–1	(Norway) Molde	Estádio das Antas, Porto
19:45	Deco 1', 28'; Jardel 58'	Report	Hestad 82'	Attendance: 26,000; Referee: Graham Barber (England)

3 November 1999 6	Olympiacos (Greece)	1–0	(Portugal) Porto	Olympic Stadium, Athens
21:45	Giannakopoulos 56'	Report		Attendance: 24,131; Referee: Kim Milton Nielsen (Denmark)

==== Second group stage ====
Pos	Team	Pld	W	D	L	GF	GA	GD	Pts	Qualification
1	(Spain) Barcelona	6	5	1	0	17	5	+12	16	Advance to knockout stage
2	(Portugal) Porto	6	3	1	2	8	8	0	10	Advance to knockout stage
3	(Czech Republic) Sparta Prague	6	1	2	3	5	12	−7	5	
4	(Germany) Hertha BSC	6	0	2	4	3	8	−5	2	

Source: UEFA

23 November 1999 1	Sparta Prague (Czech Republic)	0–2	(Portugal) Porto	Letná Stadium, Prague
20:45		Report	Drulović 77'; Jardel 84'	Attendance: 14,625; Referee: Gilles Veissière (France)

8 December 1999 2	Porto (Portugal)	1–0	(Germany) Hertha BSC	Estádio das Antas, Porto
19:45	Drulović 79'	Report		Attendance: 24,300; Referee: Ryszard Wójcik (Poland)

1 March 2000 3	Barcelona (Spain)	4–2	(Portugal) Porto	Camp Nou, Barcelona
20:45	Rivaldo 16', 89'; F. de Boer 22'; Kluivert 45'	Report	Jardel 5', 79'	Attendance: 75,000; Referee: Paul Durkin (England)

7 March 2000 4	Porto (Portugal)	0–2	(Spain) Barcelona	Estádio das Antas, Porto
19:45		Report	Abelardo 37'; Rivaldo 59'	Attendance: 45,492; Referee: Stefano Braschi (Italy)

15 March 2000 5	Porto (Portugal)	2–2	(Czech Republic) Sparta Prague	Estádio das Antas, Porto
19:45	Jorge Costa 16'; Capucho 64'	Report	Lokvenc 74'; Fukal 90'	Attendance: 27,200; Referee: Günter Benkö (Austria)

21 March 2000 6	Hertha BSC (Germany)	0–1	(Portugal) Porto	Olympiastadion, Berlin
20:45		Report	Clayton 69'	Attendance: 30,506; Referee: Pierluigi Collina (Italy)

==== Knockout stage ====
Quarter-finals

4 April 2000 First leg	Porto (Portugal)	1–1	(Germany) Bayern Munich	Estádio das Antas, Porto
19:45	Jardel 47'	Report	Paulo Sérgio 80'	Attendance: 20,125; Referee: Nikolai Levnikov (Russia)

19 April 2000 Second leg	Bayern Munich (Germany)	2–1 (3–2 agg.)	(Portugal) Porto	Olympiastadion, Munich
20:45	Paulo Sérgio 15'; Linke 90+3'	Report	Jardel 90'	Attendance: 47,000; Referee: Hugh Dallas (Scotland)
