= 2000 Taça de Portugal final =

2000 Taça de Portugal Final
- Event: 1999–2000 Taça de Portugal
Porto	Sporting CP
Porto	Sporting CP
1	1
- Date: 21 May 2000
- Venue: Estádio Nacional, Oeiras
- Referee: António Costa (Porto)

Replay
Porto	Sporting CP
2	0
- Date: 25 May 2000
- Venue: Estádio Nacional, Oeiras
- Referee: Lucílio Batista (Lisbon)

The 2000 Taça de Portugal Final was the final match of the 1999–2000 Taça de Portugal, the 59th season of the Taça de Portugal, the premier Portuguese football cup competition organized by the Portuguese Football Federation (FPF). The final was played at the Estádio Nacional in Oeiras, and opposed two Primeira Liga sides Porto and Sporting CP. As the inaugural final match finished 1–1, the final was replayed four days later at the same venue with the Dragões defeating the Leões 2–0 to claim their tenth Taça de Portugal.

In Portugal, the final was televised live on TVI. As a result of Porto winning the Taça de Portugal, the Dragões qualified for the 2000 Supertaça Cândido de Oliveira where they took on their cup opponents who won the 1999–2000 Primeira Liga.

== Match ==
=== Details ===
21 May 2000
17:00 WEST

Porto	1–1 (a.e.t.)	Sporting CP
Jardel 4'		Barbosa 56'

Estádio Nacional, Oeiras
Referee: António Costa (Porto)

Porto	Sporting CP

GK	24	(Portugal) Hilário
RB	7	(Portugal) Carlos Secretário
CB	33	(Portugal) Ricardo Silva	(yellow card) 88'
CB	4	(Brazil) Aloísio (c)
LB	30	(Brazil) Esquerdinha
DM	20	(Portugal) Paulinho Santos	(yellow card) 15'	(substituted off) 36'
CM	18	(Portugal) Carlos Chaínho
CM	3	(Brazil) Rubens Júnior		(substituted off) 46'
RM	21	(Portugal) Capucho
LM	11	(Federal Republic of Yugoslavia) Ljubinko Drulović
CF	16	(Brazil) Mário Jardel	(yellow card) 85'	(substituted off) 105'
Substitutes:
MF	8	(Portugal) Rui Barros	(yellow card) 81'	(substituted on) 36'
FW	17	(Brazil) Alessandro Cambalhota		(substituted on) 105'
FW	28	(Brazil) Clayton	(yellow card) 60'	(substituted on) 46'
Manager:
(Portugal) Fernando Santos

GK	1	(Denmark) Peter Schmeichel
RB	20	(Morocco) Abdelilah Saber	(yellow card) 41'
CB	22	(Portugal) Beto
CB	50	(Brazil) André Cruz	(yellow card) 29'
LB	23	(Portugal) Rui Jorge	(yellow card) 48'	(substituted off) 67'
RM	8	(Portugal) Pedro Barbosa (c)		(substituted off) 68'
CM	17	(Portugal) Luís Vidigal
CM	5	(Argentina) Aldo Duscher
LM	25	(Italy) Ivone De Franceschi		(substituted off) 88'
CF	19	(Ghana) Kwame Ayew
CF	11	(Argentina) Beto Acosta	(yellow card) 51'
Substitutes:
GK	12	(Portugal) Nélson
DF	6	(Argentina) Facundo Quiroga		(substituted on) 67'
MF	18	(Portugal) Bino
FW	14	(Spain) Toñito		(substituted on) 88'
FW	48	(Belgium) Mbo Mpenza		(substituted on) 68'
Manager:
(Portugal) Augusto Inácio

Match officials

- Assistant referees:
- Fourth official:

Match rules

- 90 minutes.
- 30 minutes of extra time if necessary.
- Maximum of three substitutions

== Replay ==
=== Details ===
25 May 2000
20:30 WEST

Porto	2–0	Sporting CP
Clayton 47'; Deco 74'

Estádio Nacional, Oeiras
Referee: Lucílio Batista (Lisbon)

Porto	Sporting CP

GK	99	(Portugal) Vítor Baía
RB	7	(Portugal) Carlos Secretário	(yellow card) 66'
CB	2	(Portugal) Jorge Costa (c)	(yellow card) 25'
CB	4	(Brazil) Aloísio	(yellow card) 68'
LB	30	(Brazil) Esquerdinha
DM	18	(Portugal) Carlos Chaínho
CM	29	(Brazil) Deco	(yellow card) 75'	(substituted off) 90'
CM	28	(Brazil) Clayton		(substituted off) 77'
RM	21	(Portugal) Capucho		(substituted off) 90'
LM	11	(Serbia and Montenegro) Ljubinko Drulović	(yellow card) 83'
CF	16	(Brazil) Mário Jardel
Substitutes:
MF	8	(Portugal) Rui Barros		(substituted on) 77'
FW	9	(Portugal) Domingos Paciência		(substituted on) 90'
FW	17	(Brazil) Alessandro Cambalhota		(substituted on) 90'
Manager:
(Portugal) Fernando Santos

GK	1	(Denmark) Peter Schmeichel	(yellow card) 35'
RB	20	(Morocco) Abdelilah Saber	(yellow card) 31'
CB	22	(Portugal) Beto
CB	50	(Brazil) André Cruz		(substituted off) 42'
LB	23	(Portugal) Rui Jorge
RM	48	(Belgium) Mbo Mpenza
CM	5	(Argentina) Aldo Duscher
CM	17	(Portugal) Luís Vidigal	(yellow card) 45'
LM	8	(Portugal) Pedro Barbosa (c)		(substituted off) 67'
CF	10	(Brazil) Edmilson		(substituted off) 69'
CF	19	(Ghana) Kwame Ayew
Substitutes:
GK	12	(Portugal) Nélson
DF	6	(Argentina) Facundo Quiroga		(substituted on) 42'
MF	18	(Portugal) Bino
MF	25	(Italy) Ivone De Franceschi		(substituted on) 69'
FW	14	(Spain) Toñito	(yellow card) 83' (red card) 85'	(substituted on) 67'
Manager:
(Portugal) Augusto Inácio

1999–2000 Taça de Portugal Winners
Porto
10th Title

Match officials

- Assistant referees:
- Fourth official:

Match rules

- 90 minutes.
- 30 minutes of extra time if necessary.
- Maximum of three substitutions

== See also ==
- FC Porto–Sporting CP rivalry
- 1999–2000 FC Porto season
- 1999–2000 Sporting CP season
