= 1999 Supertaça Cândido de Oliveira =

- Event: Supertaça Cândido de Oliveira (Portuguese Super Cup)
Beira-Mar	Porto
2	5
- 2–5 on aggregate.

First leg
Beira-Mar	Porto
1	2
- Date: 7 August 1999
- Venue: Estádio Mário Duarte, Aveiro
- Man of the Match: Esquerdinha (Porto)
- Referee: Jorge Coroado (Lisbon)

Second leg
Porto	Beira-Mar
3	1
- Date: 15 August 1999
- Venue: Estádio das Antas, Porto
- Man of the Match: Mário Jardel (Porto)
- Referee: Isidoro Rodrigues (Viseu)

The 1999 Supertaça Cândido de Oliveira was the 21st edition of the Supertaça Cândido de Oliveira, the annual Portuguese football season-opening match contested by the winners of the previous season's top league and cup competitions (or cup runner-up in case the league- and cup-winning club is the same). The 1999 Supertaça Cândido de Oliveira was contested over two legs, and opposed Porto of the Primeira Liga and Beira-Mar of the Liga de Honra. Porto qualified for the SuperCup by winning the 1998–99 Primeira Divisão, whilst Beira-Mar qualified for their first Supertaça by winning the 1998–99 Taça de Portugal.

The first leg was televised on RTP, whilst the second leg was televised on TVI. The first leg which took place at the Estádio Mário Duarte, saw Porto defeat the Auri-negros 2–1 thanks to late strike from Esquerdinha. The second leg which took place at the Estádio das Antas, saw the Dragões defeat the Aveiro side and thus claim an eleventh Supertaça.

== First leg ==
=== Details ===
7 August 1999

Beira-Mar	1–2	Porto
Faye 65'		Domingos 66'; Esquerdinha 73'

Estádio Mário Duarte, Aveiro
Referee: Jorge Coroado (Lisbon)

Beira-Mar	Porto

GK	1	(France) Jérôme Palatsi
RB	25	(Portugal) Pedro Ribeiro
CB	23	(Portugal) Vítor Silva
CB	3	(Portugal) Gila	(red card) 48'
CB	4	(Brazil) Lobão
LB	5	(Brazil) Cristiano Roland
RM	16	(Portugal) Paulo Sérgio (substituted off) 80'
CM	6	(Canada) Fernando Aguiar
CM	15	(Portugal) Fusco (c)
LM	10	(Portugal) Óscar (substituted off) 27'
CF	26	(Ghana) Maxwell Konadu (substituted off) 27'
Substitutes:
MF	21	(Portugal) Eduardo		Substituted on
FW	9	(Senegal) Fary Faye		Substituted on
FW	11	(Portugal) Rui Dolores		Substituted on
Manager:
(Portugal) António Sousa

GK	99	(Portugal) Vítor Baía
RB	7	(Portugal) Carlos Secretário
CB	2	(Portugal) Jorge Costa (c)
CB	4	(Brazil) Aloísio
LB	30	(Brazil) Esquerdinha
CM	6	(Portugal) Emílio Peixe	(substituted off) 82'
RM	11	(Federal Republic of Yugoslavia) Ljubinko Drulović
AM	8	(Portugal) Rui Barros	(substituted off) 59'
AM	10	(Portugal) Ricardo Sousa	(substituted off) 45'
LM	21	(Portugal) Capucho
CF	9	(Portugal) Domingos
Substitutes:
MF	14	(Portugal) Rodolfo	(substituted on) 82'
FW	15	(Hungary) Miklós Fehér	(substituted on) 65'
FW	27	(Portugal) Romeu	(substituted on) 56'
Manager:
(Portugal) Fernando Santos

Man of the Match

- (Brazil) Esquerdinha (Porto)

Match officials

- Assistant referees:
- Fourth official:

Match rules

- 90 minutes.
- Maximum of three substitutions

== Second leg ==
=== Details ===
15 August 1999

Porto	3–1	Beira-Mar
Jardel 6', 81'; Lobão 86' (o.g.)		Óscar 28'

Estádio das Antas, Porto
Referee: Isidoro Rodrigues (Viseu)

Porto	Beira-Mar

GK	99	(Portugal) Vítor Baía
RB	7	(Portugal) Carlos Secretário
CB	2	(Portugal) Jorge Costa (c)
CB	4	(Brazil) Aloísio
LB	30	(Brazil) Esquerdinha
RM	17	(Brazil) Alessandro Cambalhota	(substituted off) 85'
CM	6	(Portugal) Emílio Peixe
CM	8	(Portugal) Carlos Chaínho	(substituted off) 45'
LM	21	(Portugal) Capucho
CF	9	(Portugal) Domingos	(substituted off) 45'
CF	21	(Brazil) Mário Jardel
Substitutes:
DF	3	(Brazil) Rubens Júnior	(substituted on) 45'
MF	10	(Portugal) Ricardo Sousa	(substituted on) 45'
FW	27	(Portugal) Romeu	(substituted on) 85'
Manager:
(Portugal) Fernando Santos

GK	1	(France) Jérôme Palatsi
RB	25	(Portugal) Pedro Ribeiro		(substituted off) 79'
CB	5	(Brazil) Lobão
CB	5	(Brazil) Cristiano Roland
LB	23	(Portugal) Vítor Silva
RM	16	(Portugal) Paulo Sérgio
CM	6	(Canada) Fernando Aguiar		(substituted off) 87'
CM	15	(Portugal) Fusco (c)
LM	10	(Portugal) Óscar
CF	26	(Ghana) Maxwell Konadu	(red card) 73'
CF	11	(Portugal) Rui Dolores
Substitutes:
DF		(Portugal) Pedro Marques		(substituted on) 87'
FW	8	(Portugal) João Paulo		(substituted on) 79'
Manager:
(Portugal) António Sousa

1999 Supertaça Cândido de Oliveira Winners
Porto
11th Title

Man of the Match

- (Brazil) Mário Jardel (Porto)

Match officials

- Assistant referees:
- Fourth official:

Match rules

- 90 minutes.
- Maximum of three substitutions

== See also ==
- 1999–2000 Primeira Liga
- 1999–2000 Taça de Portugal
- 1999–2000 FC Porto season
