= Luís Miguel (footballer, born 1972) =

Portuguese footballer

Personal information
- Full name: Luís Miguel Fontes Martins
- Date of birth: 24 July 1972 (age 54)
- Place of birth: Santa Maria da Feira, Portugal
- Height: 1.74 m (5 ft 9 in)
- Position: Midfielder

Youth career
- 1982–1983: União Lamas
- 1985–1986: Feirense
- 1986–1990: Porto

Senior career*
Years	Team	Apps	(Gls)
1990–1992	Gil Vicente	4	(0)
1990–1991	→ Rio Ave (loan)	26	(4)
1992–1993	União Lamas	17	(4)
1993–1994	Felgueiras	0	(0)
1994–1998	União Lamas	102	(14)
1998–1999	Cucujães	23	(9)
1999	União Lamas	5	(0)
2000–2002	Cucujães	30	(7)
2003–2004	Ginásio Tavira		
Total		207	(38)

International career
1991	Portugal U20	5	(0)
1992	Portugal U21	3	(0)
Medal record
Men's football
Representing Portugal
FIFA U-20 World Cup
Winner	1991 Portugal
- * Club domestic league appearances and goals

Luís Miguel Fontes Martins (born 24 July 1972 in Santa Maria da Feira, Aveiro District), known as Luís Miguel, is a Portuguese former professional footballer who played as a midfielder.
