= Mário Jardel =

Brazilian footballer

Mario Jardel
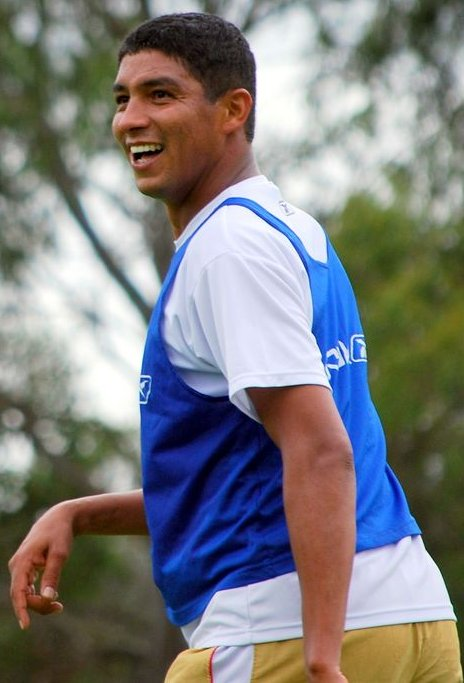
- Jardel training with Newcastle Jets

Personal information
- Full name: Mário Jardel de Almeida Ribeiro
- Date of birth: 18 September 1973 (age 53)
- Place of birth: Fortaleza, Brazil
- Height: 1.88 m (6 ft 2 in)
- Position: Forward

Senior career*
Years	Team	Apps	(Gls)
1991–1996	Vasco da Gama	15	(3)
1995–1996	→ Grêmio (loan)	84	(65)
1996–2000	Porto	125	(129)
2000–2001	Galatasaray	24	(22)
2001–2003	Sporting CP	49	(53)
2003–2004	Bolton Wanderers	7	(0)
2004	→ Ancona (loan)	3	(0)
2004–2005	Newell's Old Boys	3	(3)
2005–2006	Goiás	4	(1)
2006–2007	Beira-Mar	12	(3)
2007	Anorthosis Famagusta	7	(2)
2007–2008	Newcastle Jets	11	(0)
2008	Criciúma	17	(6)
2009	Ferroviário	6	(5)
2009	América (CE)	11	(8)
2010	Flamengo (PI)	0	(0)
2010	Cherno More	8	(1)
2011	Rio Negro	0	(0)
Total		328	(254)

International career
1993	Brazil U20	1	(0)
1996–2001	Brazil	10	(1)
Medal record
Representing Brazil
Men's football
FIFA World Youth Championship
Winner	1993 Australia
- * Club domestic league appearances and goals

Mário Jardel de Almeida Ribeiro (Brazilian Portuguese: [ˈmaɾiu ʒaʁˈdɛw]; born 18 September 1973) is a Brazilian former professional footballer who played as a forward. He was most noted for his positioning on the field and his heading ability. In spite of only representing Grêmio on loan for a single season, he is highly regarded by the club's fanbase for playing a major part in the squad that won the 1995 Copa Libertadores. With his exceptional positioning ability, he was able to become one of Europe's most prolific strikers during his time at Porto, Galatasaray, and Sporting CP, scoring 270 goals in 280 matches for those clubs. He won two European Golden Shoes, remaining the only Brazilian to do so.

After leaving Sporting CP in 2003 at age 29, Jardel had a succession of brief and unsuccessful stints at clubs in England, Italy, Cyprus, Bulgaria, Argentina and Australia. He then played for several smaller clubs in Brazil before retiring in 2011.

Jardel made his debut for the Brazil national team in 1996, making a total of 10 appearances and being selected for the 2001 Copa América.

== Club career ==
=== Brazil ===
Jardel played first for Vasco da Gama, but moved in 1995 to Grêmio, where he played a major role in the squad that won the 1995 Copa Libertadores, scoring 12 goals to be crowned the tournament's top goal scorer, including a hat-trick in the quarter-finals against Roberto Carlos' Palmeiras, and a goal in the final against Atlético Nacional.

=== Porto ===
In 1996, Jardel was linked to several teams, and after failing to transfer to Benfica and Rangers (due to the strict British rules involving non-EU players), he signed with Portuguese side Porto, where with help from players such as Zlatko Zahovič, Sérgio Conceição and Ljubinko Drulović, he was the top goalscorer in Europe for three years (1998–99, 1999–00, 2001–02), with a goal average of slightly over one goal per match (129 goals in 125 matches for an average of 1.03 per match). Although he was top scorer three times, due to the use of coefficients based on each European league's standards, he only won twice, the 1998–99 and 2001–02 European Golden Boots. He lost out to Kevin Phillips in 1999–2000 despite Phillips having scored six fewer goals than Jardel.

In a 2014 interview, Jardel revealed that, during his spell at Porto, he consumed cocaine with the knowledge of both the club's doctor and physiotherapist.

=== Galatasaray ===
Mário Jardel joined Galatasaray in July 2000 from Porto for a reported fee of €17 million, brought in to replace legendary striker Hakan Şükür, who had transferred to Inter Milan that same summer. Expectations were high, and Jardel quickly lived up to them with a prolific scoring record during his lone season at the club. He made his official debut for Galatasaray on 19 August 2000, in a Süper Lig home match against Erzurumspor. Jardel delivered a stunning performance, scoring five goals in a 7–0 victory. Just six days later, on 25 August 2000, he starred in the 2000 UEFA Super Cup against Real Madrid, scoring twice—including the golden goal in extra time—to lead Galatasaray to a historic 2–1 victory and the club’s first UEFA Super Cup title.

Over the course of the 2000–01 season, Jardel scored 34 goals in 43 appearances across all competitions. In the Süper Lig, he netted 22 goals in 24 matches, finishing as one of the league’s top scorers and helping Galatasaray secure a second-place finish. Jardel also impressed in European competition. He scored 11 goals in 17 appearances during Galatasaray’s UEFA Champions League campaign, including a key goal in the 3–2 comeback win against Real Madrid in the quarter-final first leg on 3 April 2001. Despite his success, Jardel left the club after just one season, transferring to Portuguese club Sporting CP in July 2001, where he continued his prolific scoring career in Portugal.

=== Sporting CP ===
In 2001–02, Jardel returned to Portugal; Sporting CP signed him on the last day of transfer window and offered a contract worth €11 million over three seasons. Sporting transferred Galatasaray three players: Mbo Mpenza, Robert Spehar and Pavel Horváth (valued €3.4 million), as well as US$5 million in cash.

The 2001–02 season proved hugely successful for Jardel, as he scored 42 goals in 30 matches (17 via penalties) as Sporting CP won both the Primeira Liga and the Taça de Portugal. He also won Portuguese Footballer of the Year by Record newspaper, the first foreign player to achieve this.

=== Decline ===
While the 2001–02 season was arguably the best of Jardel's career, the following 2002–03 season proved to be the beginning of the end. Again omitted from the Brazil national team squad, this time for the 2002 FIFA World Cup (despite his tremendous goal-scoring abilities he was rarely called up), and unfit at the start of the season, he spent the year on the injury list.

During the Christmas break, Jardel returned to his native Fortaleza, where he injured his knee in a swimming pool fall. He scored only nine goals that season. He was granted, alongside Deco, Portuguese citizenship in February 2003.

In August 2003, Jardel moved to English club Bolton Wanderers, with Sporting CP to receive a transfer fee up to €1.5 million based on his performances in the 2003–04 and 2004–05 seasons. However, Jardel failed to score a single league goal for the club, though he scored three goals in the League Cup, where Bolton were eventually losing finalists. These goals came in matches against Walsall, where Jardel scored twice, and Liverpool at Anfield. Sam Allardyce, Bolton's head coach that season, named Jardel the worst player he had ever managed due to his lack of dedication.

During the winter break, Jardel went on loan to Italian side Ancona, but could not convince the staff of his physical capabilities. Ancona supporters called him "lardel" (a pun on the Italian "lardo", meaning lard) due to him being overweight. Regarding his debut against Milan, an Italian journalist also said, "We stretch a veil of silence in respect of what he has been."

In August 2004, Jardel signed a contract with Argentine club Newell's Old Boys, for which Bolton did not receive any transfer fee.

In September 2005, Jardel signed a contract with Brazilian first-division side Goiás until 31 December 2006.

Jardel returned to Portugal to sign for Beira Mar for the 2006–07 season, for an undisclosed fee. Despite arriving at the club overweight, he worked hard and trained specifically to lose weight and gain physical form and scored one goal on his debut for Beira-Mar in a 2–2 draw against Aves. In the winter transfer season, Jardel signed for the Cypriot team Anorthosis Famagusta.

On 14 July 2007, Jardel played for Scottish Premier League club St Mirren, as a trialist in a 3–0 win over first division side Stirling Albion.

=== Newcastle Jets ===
On 14 August 2007, Australian A-League side Newcastle United Jets officially announced at a press conference in Newcastle they had signed Jardel on a one-year contract as their marquee player. Jardel was rumoured to join the club for weeks before the official announcement was made. He arrived in Australia on 12 August 2007 and traveled to Newcastle on 13 August.

Jardel worked hard on his fitness before arriving in Newcastle. He was unable to play for the Jets in the first three rounds as he was in Australia on a tourist visa. He eventually had his sport visa approved before the start of Round 4. He made his debut as a substitute in the 70th minute at the EnergyAustralia Stadium against Adelaide United in Round 4. Newcastle won the match 1–0 with a strike from Mark Bridge in the 81st minute.

After joining the Jets, Jardel saw little game time, usually making an appearance as a late substitute. The owner of Newcastle Jets, Con Constantine, who brought Jardel to Newcastle, expressed his desire for Jardel to stay on the field for longer. However, Newcastle head coach Gary van Egmond was reluctant to give the Brazilian a larger role.

On 3 November 2007, Jardel played nearly 20 minutes against Sydney FC. He showed some positive signs, nearly equalising for Newcastle with a trademark header from a Joel Griffiths corner kick. Sydney goalkeeper Clint Bolton saved the initial header before Jardel's follow-up was cleared off the line.

However, after showing glimpses of class, manager van Egmond perceived Jardel to be surplus to requirements and was told he could leave the club halfway through the season. He was reportedly being paid $3,000 per week by club owner Con Constantine. He left the club on 24 January 2008 to be with his sick mother in Brazil. The Jets went on to win the 2008 A-League Grand Final.

=== Brazil lower divisions (2008–10) ===
On 29 June 2008, Jardel joined Campeonato Brasileiro Série B club Criciúma. He scored four goals in the Brazilian Serie B season 2008. Unfortunately for Jardel his club, was relegated from Serie B; finishing 18th with 41 points from 38 games.

Jardel joined to Ferroviário on 4 February 2009. On 11 March 2009, Jardel made his Ferroviário debut with a very classy goal, a reminder of his past years of glory as one of the best finishers ever to play on the Portuguese Liga. In August 2009 he signed a 6-month contract with América de Fortaleza, but released on 30 October 2009.

On 20 January 2010, Jardel signed a contract until the end of 2010 Campeonato Piauiense with Flamengo. He became a free agent on 10 June 2010.

=== Cherno More ===
On 27 June 2010, Jardel arrived in Varna, Bulgaria in order to negotiate terms with Bulgarian club Cherno More Varna. A day later, on 28 June 2010, Jardel signed a one-year contract with the Sailors and was officially presented as a new signing of the club. Jardel was welcomed by 300 fans at his presentation at the Ticha Stadium. He made his new club debut on 17 July, in a friendly match against Romanian side Victoria Brăneşti, with the match ending in a 2–2 draw.

Jardel made his competitive debut for the Sailors during the 2010–11 season on 7 August 2010 in a 0–2 away loss against Lokomotiv Plovdiv, coming on as a substitute for compatriot Marco Tiago. In the next round of A PFG Mário played 26 minutes as a substitute for a 1–0 home win against Akademik Sofia. On 31 October 2010, he scored his first goal for the Bulgarian team, scoring the only goal in a 1–0 victory over Lokomotiv Sofia. On 28 November 2010, it was reported that Jardel had left Cherno More, in part due to concerns pertaining to the cold weather conditions in Bulgaria.

=== Atlético Rio Negro Clube ===
On 21 December 2010, it was reported that Jardel signed a one-year deal with Rio Negro from Manaus, Amazonas.

== International career ==
Jardel was capped for the national team first when he was 19 years old. In March 1993, Jardel capped one time for the Brazil national under-20 football team during the FIFA U-20 World Cup in Australia. Brazil became champions of the tournament.

Jardel's debut for the Seleção was as a substitute replacing Ronaldo during a friendly game against Russia in August 1996. He was also a part of the national team squad during the Copa América tournament in 2001.

== Political career ==
In the 2014 general election, Jardel was elected to the Chamber of Deputies on the Brazilian Social Democratic Party ticket, with 41,000 votes.

According to Brazil's Public Prosecutor's Office, Jardel and 10 other people have extorted staff, nominated fake members and diverted funds for their own benefit. The Prosecutor's Office finished the accusation in February 2016 as a result of the investigation started in 2015 (Operação Gol Contra), triggering the process to terminate Jardel's term in the Chamber of Deputies. Fellow politician Marlon Santos stated at the time that Jardel was involved in activities "which are not compatible with parliamentary ethics". Jardel was also accused by Santos of being involved in drug trafficking, with Santos stating "There is clear proof that the car allocated by the parliament has been used to drive drug dealers around".

On 8 June 2016, the Parliament Ethics commission approved the request to terminate Jardel's term. The case was transferred to the Constitution and Justice Commission, who approved the case in December 2016. A final vote was held in the Parliament in December 2016 where it was unanimously decided to terminate Jardel's term.

== Career statistics ==
=== Club ===
Appearances and goals by club, season and competition
Club	Season	League			Cup		Continental		Other (Note: Includes Campeonato Carioca, Campeonato Gaúcho, Supertaça Cândido de Oliveira, Intercontinental Cup and UEFA Super Cup)		Total	
Club	Season	Division	Apps	Goals	Apps	Goals	Apps	Goals	Apps	Goals	Apps	Goals
Vasco da Gama	1992	Série A	0	0	0	0	0	0	2	1	2	1
Vasco da Gama	1993	Série A	2	0	3	0	0	0	18	9	23	9
Vasco da Gama	1994	Série A	13	3	7	3	0	0	14	4	34	10
Vasco da Gama	Total		15	3	10	3	0	0	34	14	59	20
Grêmio (loan)	1995	Série A	13	10	13	6	14	12	24	14	64	42
Grêmio (loan)	1996	Série A	0	0	5	1	7	5	17	8	29	14
Grêmio (loan)	Total		13	10	18	7	21	17	41	22	93	55
Porto	1996–97	Primeira Liga	31	30	6	3	8	4	1	0	46	37
Porto	1997–98	Primeira Liga	30	26	3	10	5	3	2	0	40	39
Porto	1998–99	Primeira Liga	32	36	0	0	6	2	1	0	39	38
Porto	1999–2000	Primeira Liga	32	37 (Note: Does not include the second goal scored in 3–0 win against Braga on 5 February 2000; some sites such as worldfootball and BeSoccer attribute it to Carlos Chaínho, while others attribute it to Jardel.)	4	6	13	10	1	2	50	55
Porto	Total		125	129	13	19	32	19	5	2	175	169
Galatasaray	2000–01	Süper Lig	24	22	2	1	16	9	1	2	43	34
Sporting CP	2001–02	Primeira Liga	30	42	6	7	6	6	0	0	42	55
Sporting CP	2002–03	Primeira Liga	19	11	1	1	0	0	0	0	20	12
Sporting CP	Total		49	53	7	8	6	6	0	0	62	67
Bolton Wanderers	2003–04	Premier League	7	0	5	3	0	0	0	0	12	3
Ancona (loan)	2003–04	Serie A	3	0	0	0	0	0	0	0	3	0
Newell's Old Boys	2004–05	Argentine Primera División	3	3	0	0	0	0	0	0	3	3
Goiás	2006	Série A	4	1	0	0	0	0	0	0	4	1
Beira-Mar	2006–07	Primeira Liga	12	3	1	1	0	0	0	0	13	4
Anorthosis Famagusta	2006–07	Cypriot First Division	7	2	0	0	0	0	0	0	7	2
Newcastle Jets	2007–08	A-League	11	0	0	0	0	0	0	0	11	0
Criciúma	2008	Série B	16	4	0	0	0	0	0	0	16	4
Ferroviário	2009	Série D	6	5	0	0	0	0	0	0	6	5
América	2009	Série C (CE)	11	8	0	0	0	0	0	0	11	8
Flamengo (PI)	2010	Série D	16	12	0	0	0	0	0	0	16	12
Cherno More	2010–11	Bulgarian First League	8	1	0	0	0	0	0	0	8	1
Rio Negro	2011	Amazonense	0	0	0	0	0	0	0	0	0	0
Career total			343	264	56	42	75	51	81	40	542	389

=== International ===
Appearances and goals by national team and year
National team	Year	Apps	Goals
Brazil	1996	2	0
Brazil	1997	1	0
Brazil	1998	0	0
Brazil	1999	2	0
Brazil	2000	2	1
Brazil	2001	3	0

List of international goals scored by Mário Jardel
No.	Date	Venue	Opponent	Score	Result	Competition
1	23 February 2000	Rajamangala Stadium, Bangkok, Thailand	Thailand	6-0	7-0	2000 King's Cup

== Honours ==
Vasco da Gama

- Campeonato Carioca: 1992, 1993, 1994

Grêmio

- Copa Libertadores: 1995
- Recopa Sudamericana: 1996
- Campeonato Gaúcho: 1995, 1996

Porto

- Primeira Liga: 1996–97, 1997–98, 1998–99
- Taça de Portugal: 1997–98, 1999–2000
- Supertaça Cândido de Oliveira: 1996, 1998, 1999

Galatasaray

- UEFA Super Cup: 2000

Sporting CP

- Primeira Liga: 2001–02
- Taça de Portugal: 2001–02

Newell's Old Boys

- Argentine Primera División: 2004

Goiás

- Campeonato Goiano: 2006

Anorthosis

- Cypriot Cup: 2006–07

Newcastle Jets

- A-League: 2007–08

Brazil U20

- FIFA World Youth Championship: 1993

Individual

- Copa Libertadores top goalscorer: 1995
- Primeira Liga top goalscorer: 1996–97, 1997–98, 1998–99, 1999–2000, 2001–02
- Taça de Portugal top goalscorer: 1997–98, 1999–00, 2001–02
- European Golden Shoe: 1998–99, 2001–02
- UEFA Champions League top goalscorer: 1999–2000
- Portuguese Golden Ball: 1997, 1998, 2002
