= Palatsi =

Palatsi may refer to:

- Jérôme Palatsi, French footballer
- Jorge Palatsí, Spanish footballer
- Palatsi (opera), opera composed by Aulis Sallinen
