= Fernando Pires =

Fernando Pires may refer to:

- Fernando Pires (footballer, born 1951), Brazilian football player and coach known as Fernando
- Fernando Pires (footballer, born 1969), Portuguese football player and coach
- Fanã (born 1960), Portuguese football manager born Fernando Marques de Sousa Pires
