= Jorge Costa =

Portuguese footballer (1971–2025)

- Costa with Standard Liège in 2005

Personal information
- Full name: Jorge Paulo Costa Almeida
- Date of birth: 14 October 1971
- Place of birth: Porto, Portugal
- Date of death: 5 August 2025 (aged 53)
- Place of death: Porto, Portugal
- Height: 1.88 m (6 ft 2 in)
- Position: Centre-back

Youth career
- 1986–1987: Foz
- 1987–1990: Porto

Senior career*
Years	Team	Apps	(Gls)
1990–2005	Porto	251	(16)
1990–1991	→ Penafiel (loan)	23	(3)
1991–1992	→ Marítimo (loan)	31	(1)
2001–2002	→ Charlton Athletic (loan)	24	(0)
2005–2006	Standard Liège	13	(0)
Total		342	(20)

International career
1990–1991	Portugal U20	10	(1)
1991–1994	Portugal U21	21	(2)
1992–2002	Portugal	50	(2)

Managerial career
- 2006–2007: Braga (assistant)
- 2007: Braga
- 2008–2010: Olhanense
- 2010: Académica
- 2011–2012: CFR Cluj
- 2012–2013: AEL Limassol
- 2013–2014: Anorthosis
- 2014: Paços Ferreira
- 2014–2016: Gabon
- 2017: Sfaxien
- 2017: Arouca
- 2017–2018: Tours
- 2018–2020: Mumbai City
- 2020–2021: Gaz Metan Mediaș
- 2021: Farense
- 2022: Sfaxien
- 2022–2023: Académico Viseu
- 2023–2024: AVS
Medal record
Men's football
Representing Portugal
UEFA European Championship
Bronze medal – third place	2000 Belgium-Netherlands
FIFA U-20 World Cup
Winner	1991 Portugal
UEFA European Under-21 Championship
Runner-up	1994 France
UEFA European Under-17 Championship
Runner-up	1988 Spain
- * Club domestic league appearances and goals

Jorge Paulo Costa Almeida (14 October 1971 – 5 August 2025) was a Portuguese professional football player and manager.

Nicknamed Bicho (animal) and Tanque (tank) by his colleagues and fans for his aggressive and physical playing style as a central defender, he spent most of his career with Porto, being captain for several seasons and winning a total of 24 major titles, notably eight Primeira Liga championships and the 2004 Champions League. He also had brief spells in England with Charlton Athletic and in Belgium with Standard Liège.

Having earned 50 caps for Portugal, Costa represented the nation at one World Cup and one European Championship. He also won the 1991 FIFA World Youth Championship with the under-20 team.

After retiring, he worked as a manager for several clubs as well as the Gabon national team. From June 2024 until his death, he was director of football at Porto.

== Club career ==
Born in Porto, Costa made his professional debut in 1990–91 with Penafiel, on loan from hometown club Porto. The following season he was also loaned, to fellow Primeira Liga side Marítimo, appearing in 31 games including a controversial one in the Estádio das Antas where he scored an own goal; despite it being clearly unintentional, the accusations of scoring for his parent team continued, forcing Porto's president Jorge Nuno Pinto da Costa to forbid further loaned players to play against them, a decision that stood for several decades.

Costa finally joined Porto in the 1992–93 campaign, eventually becoming a starter. Five seasons later he switched to jersey No. 2, previously worn by João Pinto, also being named team captain as the veteran retired. His career there only met four black spots: three serious knee injuries (one of them ruled him out of UEFA Euro 1996) and a feud with coach Octávio Machado early in 2001–02, which forced him into "exile" at Charlton Athletic. However, the image of Costa as the captain went untouched, and Porto fans turned against Machado with massive criticism of his team management and coaching, eventually forcing him outside the club; during his time in South London, he played in defence alongside Luke Young, Mark Fish and Jonathan Fortune, in a back-line remembered for its pun name of "Young Fish Costa Fortune".

Additionally, in 1996–97's UEFA Champions League, Costa was involved in an incident with AC Milan's George Weah on 20 November 1996, with the Liberian breaking his nose, alleging that he had been racially abused. Costa strenuously denied the accusations of racism and was not charged by UEFA as no witnesses could verify Weah's allegations, not even his Milan teammates. Weah, on the other hand, was suspended for six matches, and later attempted to apologise to Costa but this was rebuffed by the Portuguese, who considered the charges of racist insults levelled against him to be defamatory and took the Liberian to court; the incident resulted in the latter being sidelined for three weeks, also having to undergo facial surgery.

Costa returned to Porto in the summer of 2002 as José Mourinho was now in charge, and was unanimously chosen as captain of a side that went on to win a treble of championship, Taça de Portugal and UEFA Cup, making him the third Porto skipper in a row to lift cups at international level (following Pinto and Fernando Gomes). The player's winning streak continued as the next season he lifted the Champions League and the Intercontinental Cup.

In January 2006, after having been deemed surplus to requirements by new coach Co Adriaanse, Costa signed for Standard Liège from Belgium, reuniting with former Porto teammate Sérgio Conceição and helping his new team to a runner-up finish in the league. He decided to retire in June for personal reasons, despite having a contract running until 2007.

Costa made 383 competitive appearances and scored 25 goals for his main club, winning eight leagues, five Portuguese cups and as many Supertaça Cândido de Oliveira.

== International career ==
In 1991, Costa was first-choice as Portugal won the FIFA U-20 World Cup. In the final against Brazil, he converted his team's first attempt in the 4–2 penalty shoot-out victory at the Estádio da Luz.

Costa made his full international debut for Carlos Queiroz' Portugal on 11 November 1992 in a 2–1 friendly win over Bulgaria in Saint-Ouen-sur-Seine, France. He played alongside Fernando Couto as the team reached the semi-finals of UEFA Euro 2000 in Belgium and the Netherlands.

Costa scored the first of two goals on 15 November 2000, in a 2–1 exhibition defeat of Israel at the Estádio 1º de Maio in Braga. He retired from international football following group-stage elimination at the 2002 FIFA World Cup in South Korea and Japan, having played 50 games; in that competition, he scored an own goal in the 3–2 loss to the United States.

== Coaching career ==
=== 2000s ===
In the 2006–07 season, Costa began his coaching career with Braga, first as assistant to Rogério Gonçalves, whom he replaced in February 2007. In his first season he led the Minho side to the fourth place and the semi-finals of the domestic cup, also reaching the round of 16 in the UEFA Cup, being ousted by Tottenham Hotspur 6–4 on aggregate.

After again guiding Braga to the UEFA Cup group stage, Costa was fired midway through his second year. He moved to Segunda Liga club Olhanense ahead of 2008–09, eventually finishing as champion and returning the Algarveans to the first division after 34 years. After helping them to 13th place the following campaign – thus safe from relegation – he left, joining fellow top-division Académica de Coimbra.

Costa announced his departure from Académica and his retirement from coaching on 21 December 2010, citing personal reasons. The team was placed ninth after the 14th round, eventually narrowly escaping relegation.

=== 2010s ===
In May 2011, Costa reneged on his retirement and signed a contract with Romania's CFR Cluj. He was dismissed the following 8 April with the team five points clear in first place with nine games to go in Liga I, following a 5–0 home loss to nearest challengers Dinamo București.

On 24 October 2012, AEL Limassol appointed Costa as their new manager, on the eve of a Europa League group stage tie against Fenerbahçe. He stayed in Cyprus the following summer, agreeing to a 1+1 deal with Anorthosis.

Costa coached the Gabon national team from 2014 until November 2016, being ousted from the 2015 Africa Cup of Nations group stage after one win and two losses. He returned to club duties on 15 May 2017, being appointed at Sfaxien. He moved back to his homeland in the following off-season, signing at Segunda Liga side Arouca and leaving by mutual consent less than three months later due to a poor string of results.

On 22 November 2017, Costa was hired at Tours, last-placed in France's Ligue 2. At the end of the season, with the club relegated in the same position, he resigned with a year remaining on his contract.

In August 2018, Costa signed for Mumbai City for the upcoming campaign of the Indian Super League. After a third-place finish, the team lost 5–2 on aggregate to Goa in the play-off semi-finals, conceding all of those goals in the first leg at home. On 5 March 2020, after finishing one place off qualification for the post-season, he was allowed to leave.

=== 2020s ===
On 23 September 2020, Gustavo Ndong Edu, president of the Equatoguinean Football Federation, announced that Costa would be the new coach of the national team. Six days later, however, he decided to join Romania's Gaz Metan Mediaș instead.

Costa returned to the Portuguese top tier on 4 February 2021, replacing the dismissed Sérgio Vieira at Farense on a four-month contract. In spite of relegation to the second division, he signed a new deal; on 30 August, however, he left by mutual consent after only one point in four matches to start the new campaign.

On 3 February 2022, Costa returned to Sfaxien for the remainder of the season. He was dismissed on 7 April after a six-game winless run, concluding with a 1–1 draw at home to Hammam-Sousse.

Costa went back to his country's second tier on 7 September 2022, being hired by Académico de Viseu in place of Pedro Ribeiro. On 20 December, he led the team to a 2–1 home win over top-flight club Boavista to make the semi-finals of the Taça da Liga for the first time; they were eliminated there by Porto, as in the quarter-finals of the national cup. Despite collecting 20 victories in 34 matches, and with his side placed fourth (17th at the time of his arrival), he left by mutual consent on 20 April 2023.

On 10 June 2023, Costa was confirmed as the manager of AVS of the same league; he was the first manager of the club after Vilafranquense relocated to Vila das Aves due to poor infrastructure. On 7 December, he received a 17-day suspension and a fine for, five days prior, having insulted and threatened the referee in a match against Benfica B. He eventually achieved top-division promotion in the play-offs, beating Portimonense 4–2 on aggregate.

Costa returned to Porto in June 2024, as director of football.

== Personal life and death ==
Costa was married to Isabel for 18 years. They divorced in 2012, with national media outlets at the time reporting he had assaulted her while he was manager of Cluj; however, she later clarified this had never happened.

While working in Gabon, Costa met Estela Rito, who would stay with him for the rest of his life. They married in September 2017 in Ponte de Lima.

In May 2022, Costa was admitted to the Santa Cruz Hospital in Oeiras with a heart condition. For this, he had to undergo surgery.

On 5 August 2025, Costa suffered a heart attack at a pre-season training session of the Porto first team. He died shortly afterwards at the University Hospital of São João; he was 53, and was survived by his three children with Isabel: 31-year-old David, a football analyst at AVS, 23-year-old Guilherme, who worked in the hotel industry, and 18-year-old Salvador who played for Leça. Just two days before the 2022 heart problems, he had become a grandfather.

== Career statistics ==
=== Club ===
Appearances and goals by club, season and competition
Club	Season	League			Cup		Europe		Other		Total	
Club	Season	Division	Apps	Goals	Apps	Goals	Apps	Goals	Apps	Goals	Apps	Goals
Porto	1992–93	Primeira Divisão	8	1	1	0	6	1	–		15	2
Porto	1993–94	Primeira Divisão	13	0	3	1	6	0	–		22	1
Porto	1994–95	Primeira Divisão	13	1	3	1	4	1	–		20	3
Porto	1995–96	Primeira Divisão	21	1	3	1	3	0	1	0	28	2
Porto	1996–97	Primeira Divisão	26	4	4	0	7	0	2	1	39	5
Porto	1997–98	Primeira Divisão	13	0	4	0	0	0	–		17	0
Porto	1998–99	Primeira Divisão	33	2	1	0	5	0	2	0	41	2
Porto	1999–2000	Primeira Liga	31	1	4	0	12	1	2	0	49	2
Porto	2000–01	Primeira Liga	20	1	3	0	10	0	2	0	35	1
Porto	2001–02	Primeira Liga	6	1	0	0	6	0	1	0	13	1
Porto	2002–03	Primeira Liga	26	2	3	1	12	0	–		41	3
Porto	2003–04	Primeira Liga	19	1	2	0	10	0	1	0	32	1
Porto	2004–05	Primeira Liga	22	1	0	0	7	1	2	0	31	2
Porto	Total		251	16	31	4	88	4	13	1	383	25
Penafiel (loan)	1990–91	Primeira Divisão	23	3	0	0	–		–		23	3
Marítimo (loan)	1991–92	Primeira Divisão	31	1	0	0	–		–		31	1
Charlton Athletic (loan)	2001–02	Premier League	24	0	2	0	–		–		26	0
Standard Liège	2005–06	Belgian Pro League	13	0	0	0	–		–		13	0
Career Total			342	20	33	4	88	4	13	1	476	29

=== International ===
Appearances and goals by national team and year
National team	Year	Apps	Goals
Portugal	1992	1	0
Portugal	1993	4	0
Portugal	1995	9	0
Portugal	1996	2	0
Portugal	1997	3	0
Portugal	1998	3	0
Portugal	1999	2	0
Portugal	2000	13	1
Portugal	2001	6	0
Portugal	2002	7	1
Total		50	2

Scores and results list Portugal's goal tally first, score column indicates score after each Costa goal.

List of international goals scored by Jorge Costa
No.	Date	Venue	Opponent	Score	Result	Competition
1	15 November 2000	Estádio Primeiro de Maio, Braga, Portugal	Israel	2–0	2–1	Friendly
2	13 February 2002	Estadi Olímpic Lluís Companys, Barcelona, Spain	Spain	1–0	1–1	Friendly

== Managerial statistics ==
As of match played 2 June 2024

Managerial record by team and tenure
Team	Nat	From	To	Record							
Team	Nat	From	To	G	W	D	L	GF	GA	GD	Win %
Braga	(Portugal)	19 February 2007	30 October 2007	29	12	7	10	33	28	+5	41.38
Olhanense	(Portugal)	16 June 2008	9 May 2010	72	26	21	25	95	95	+0	36.11
Académica	(Portugal)	8 June 2010	21 December 2010	18	7	4	7	29	33	−4	38.89
CFR Cluj	(Romania)	1 June 2011	9 April 2012	26	15	6	5	45	23	+22	57.69
AEL Limassol	(Cyprus)	24 October 2012	22 May 2013	37	20	8	9	65	38	+27	54.05
Anorthosis	(Cyprus)	18 August 2013	5 February 2014	23	11	6	6	46	28	+18	47.83
Paços Ferreira	(Portugal)	26 February 2014	22 May 2014	12	4	3	5	15	20	−5	33.33
Gabon	(Gabon)	11 July 2014	4 November 2016	33	11	9	13	37	36	+1	33.33
Sfaxien	(Tunisia)	14 May 2017	14 June 2017	3	2	0	1	6	2	+4	66.67
Arouca	(Portugal)	29 June 2017	14 September 2017	8	1	4	3	4	9	−5	12.50
Tours	(France)	22 November 2017	25 May 2018	27	6	7	14	33	44	−11	22.22
Mumbai City	(India)	14 August 2018	5 March 2020	39	17	8	14	52	56	−4	43.59
Gaz Metan Mediaș	(Romania)	30 September 2020	2 February 2021	15	6	2	7	23	22	+1	40.00
Farense	(Portugal)	4 February 2021	30 August 2021	25	5	9	11	21	35	−14	20.00
Sfaxien	(Tunisia)	3 February 2022	7 April 2022	11	2	4	5	6	9	−3	18.18
Académico Viseu	(Portugal)	7 September 2022	20 April 2023	34	20	9	5	61	35	+26	58.82
AVS	(Portugal)	10 June 2023	3 June 2024	42	24	5	13	59	44	+15	57.14
Total				454	189	112	153	630	557	+73	41.63

== Honours ==
=== Player ===
Porto

- Primeira Liga: 1992–93, 1994–95, 1995–96, 1996–97, 1997–98, 1998–99, 2002–03, 2003–04
- Taça de Portugal: 1993–94, 1997–98, 1999–2000, 2000–01, 2002–03
- Supertaça Cândido de Oliveira: 1994, 1996, 1998, 1999, 2001
- UEFA Champions League: 2003–04
- UEFA Cup: 2002–03
- Intercontinental Cup: 2004

Portugal

- FIFA U-20 World Cup: 1991

Individual

- Portuguese Golden Ball: 2000

=== Manager ===
Olhanense

- Segunda Liga: 2008–09

CFR Cluj

- Liga I: 2011–12

Individual

- CNID Breakthrough Coach: 2008–09
