= Romeu Almeida =

Portuguese footballer

Romeu
Personal information
- Full name: Romeu António Soares de Almeida
- Date of birth: 8 October 1974 (age 52)
- Place of birth: Feira, Portugal
- Height: 1.83 m (6 ft 0 in)
- Position: Striker

Youth career
- 1992–1993: Porto

Senior career*
Years	Team	Apps	(Gls)
1993–1996	Infesta	75	(7)
1996–2001	Porto	15	(0)
1996–1997	→ Felgueiras (loan)	29	(2)
1997–1998	→ Marítimo (loan)	40	(8)
1999	→ Leça (loan)	8	(3)
2001–2005	Vitória Guimarães	108	(21)
2005–2006	Belenenses	21	(2)
Total		296	(43)

International career
2002	Portugal	2	(1)
- * Club domestic league appearances and goals

Romeu António Soares de Almeida (born 8 October 1974), known simply as Romeu, is a Portuguese former footballer who played as a striker.

== Club career ==
Romeu was born in Feira (Santa Maria da Feira). Over the course of nine seasons, he amassed Primeira Liga totals of 184 games and 31 goals, mainly with C.S. Marítimo (two years) and Vitória de Guimarães (four). In 2002–03, he scored a career-best ten goals in 29 matches as the latter team finished fourth and nearly qualified to the UEFA Cup.

Romeu, who also unsuccessfully represented FC Porto for two seasons, retired in June 2006 at the age of 31 after a poor campaign with C.F. Os Belenenses, both individually (two goals) and collectively (15th place for the Lisbon club).

== International career ==
Romeu earned two caps for Portugal in October 2002: on the 16th, in his last appearance, he helped the national team come from behind 0–2 in Sweden to win it 3–2, netting the equaliser in the 53rd minute.

Romeu Almeida: International goals
No.	Date	Venue	Opponent	Score	Result	Competition
1	16 October 2002	Ullevi, Gothenburg, Sweden	Sweden	2–2	2–3	Friendly

== Honours ==
Porto

- Taça de Portugal: 1999–2000, 2000–01
- Supertaça Cândido de Oliveira: 1999
