= Rodolfo Miguens =

Portuguese football manager (born 1976)

Personal information
- Full name: Rodolfo Luís Costa Miguens Correia
- Date of birth: 6 November 1976 (age 49)
- Place of birth: Lisbon, Portugal
- Height: 1.72 m (5 ft 7 1/2 in)
- Position: Midfielder

Youth career
- 1986–1995: Estrela da Amadora

Senior career*
Years	Team	Apps	(Gls)
1995–1999	Estrela da Amadora	103	(1)
1999–2002	Porto	3	(0)
2000–2001	→ Beira-Mar (loan)	13	(0)
2001–2002	→ Varzim (loan)	26	(0)
2002–2003	Varzim	31	(1)
2003–2005	Académica de Coimbra	18	(0)
2005–2006	Clermont		
2007–2008	Igreja Nova		
2008–2009	Linda-a-Velha		

Managerial career
- 2006–2007: Damaiense (U11)
- 2007–2008: Pêro Pinheiro (U19)
- 2008–2010: CIF (U15)
- 2010–2012: Casa Pia (U11)
- 2012–2013: Panathinaikos (assistant)
- 2014: Paraná (assistant)
- 2014: CD Belas (U19)
- 2015: Zawisza Bydgoszcz (assistant)
- 2015: Olhanense (assistant)
- 2015: Tractor Sazi (assistant)
- 2016–2017: Machine Sazi (assistant)
- 2017: Harrisburg City Islanders (assistant)
- 2017–2018: Iran (assistant)
- 2018: Al Hilal B (Head Coach)
- 2018–2019: Sporting CP (assistant)
- 2020–2021: Bahrain U23 (Head Coach)
- 2021–2023: Al Hilal U23 (Head Coach)
- 2023: Qatar (assistant)
- 2024: Al-Ula (Head Coach)
- 2025: Neom SC U21 (Head Coach)
- * Club domestic league appearances and goals

Rodolfo Luís Costa Miguens Correia, known as Rodolfo (born 6 November 1976) is a Portuguese professional football manager and former player.

He played 11 seasons and 194 games in the Primeira Liga for Estrela da Amadora, Varzim, Académica de Coimbra, Beira-Mar and Porto.

== Playing career ==
He made his Primeira Liga debut for Estrela da Amadora on 30 April 1995 in a game against Porto.

== Managerial career ==
In January 2024, Rodolfo took over as manager of Saudi Third Division club Al-Ula, leading them to promotion to the Saudi Second Division League in his first two months. On 30 October 2024, Rodolfo left the club by mutual consent. Since August 2025 he is leading Neom SC U21.

== Honours ==
Player

Porto

- Taça de Portugal: 1999–2000
- Supertaça Cândido de Oliveira: 1999.

Manager

Zawisza

- Polish Super Cup: 2014

Sporting

- Taça da Liga: 2018–2019
- Taça de Portugal: 2018–2019

Al-Hilal

- U20 Saudi Premier League: 2021–2022

Al-Ula

- Saudi Third Division: 2023–2024
