= Pedro Ribeiro (footballer, born 1979) =

Portuguese footballer

Personal information
- Full name: Pedro Júlio Marques Ribeiro
- Date of birth: 8 February 1979 (age 47)
- Place of birth: Aveiro, Portugal
- Height: 1.82 m (6 ft 0 in)
- Position: Right back

Youth career
- 1988–1998: Beira-Mar

Senior career*
Years	Team	Apps	(Gls)
1998–2007	Beira-Mar	118	(1)
1998–1999	→ Cucujães (loan)	18	(1)
2007–2008	Rio Ave	8	(0)
2009	Beira-Mar	6	(0)
2009–2011	Boavista	43	(2)
2011–2013	Alba	40	(2)
Total		233	(6)

International career
1998	Portugal U20	3	(0)
- * Club domestic league appearances and goals

Pedro Júlio Marques Ribeiro (born 8 February 1979 in Aveiro) is a Portuguese retired footballer who played as a right back.
