= Paulo Sérgio (footballer, born 1971) =

Portuguese footballer

Personal information
- Full name: Paulo Sérgio Soares Marinheiro
- Date of birth: 14 December 1971 (age 54)
- Place of birth: Cortegaça, Portugal
- Height: 1.81 m (5 ft 11 1/2 in)
- Position: Forward

Youth career
- 1983–1987: Cortegaça
- 1987–1989: Porto
- 1989–1990: Sporting Espinho

Senior career*
Years	Team	Apps	(Gls)
1990–1991	Cortegaça		
1991–1994	Feirense	32	(0)
1994–1997	Cucujães		
1997–2000	Beira-Mar	76	(6)
2000–2001	Leixões	30	(4)
2001–2003	Marco	51	(1)
2003–2004	São João de Ver		
2004–2005	Recreio de Águeda		
2005–2006	Pampilhosa	7	(0)
2006–2007	Sanjoanense		
2007–2011	União de Lamas		
- * Club domestic league appearances and goals

Paulo Sérgio Soares Marinheiro, known as Paulo Sérgio (born 14 December 1971) is a former Portuguese football player.

== Club career ==
He made his Primeira Liga debut for Beira-Mar on 15 November 1998 in a game against Farense.

== Honours ==
Beira-Mar

- Taça de Portugal: 1998–99
