= 1995–96 Segunda Divisão B =

Segunda Divisão
- Season: 1995–96
- Champions: Varzim SC
- Promoted: SC Covilhã; Varzim SC; CD Beja
- Relegated: 13 teams

The 1995–96 Segunda Divisão season was the 62nd season of the competition and the 49th season of recognised third-tier football in Portugal.

== Overview ==
The league was contested by 54 teams in 3 divisions with SC Covilhã, Varzim SC and CD Beja winning the respective divisional competitions and gaining promotion to the Liga de Honra. The overall championship was won by Varzim SC.

== League standings ==
=== Segunda Divisão - Zona Norte ===
Pos	Team	Pld	W	D	L	GF	GA	GD	Pts	Promotion or relegation
1	Varzim SC	34	20	10	4	55	25	+30	70	Promotion to Liga de Honra
2	Infesta FC	34	16	7	11	82	59	+23	55	
3	Lixa FC	34	15	10	9	48	35	+13	55	
4	AD Esposende	34	15	8	11	55	42	+13	53	
5	SC Vila Real	34	15	8	11	45	34	+11	53	
6	FC Maia	34	14	10	10	47	34	+13	52	
7	FC Vizela	34	13	12	9	48	35	+13	51	
8	Lusitânia Lourosa	34	14	8	12	38	42	−4	50	
9	SC Vianense	34	15	4	15	46	41	+5	49	
10	Leixões SC	34	14	6	14	47	42	+5	48	
11	FC Marco	34	14	5	15	38	39	−1	47	
12	SC Lamego	34	12	9	13	36	31	+5	45	
13	SC Freamunde	34	12	9	13	40	44	−4	45	
14	AD Sanjoanense	34	11	8	15	39	52	−13	41	
15	Amarante FC	34	10	10	14	42	51	−9	40	Relegation to Terceira Divisão
16	Os Sandinenses	34	8	15	11	29	43	−14	39	Relegation to Terceira Divisão
17	AD Limianos	34	7	9	18	37	66	−29	30	Relegation to Terceira Divisão
18	Santa Maria FC	34	4	6	24	23	80	−57	18	Relegation to Terceira Divisão

=== Segunda Divisão - Zona Centro ===
Pos	Team	Pld	W	D	L	GF	GA	GD	Pts	Promotion or relegation
1	SC Covilhã	34	22	7	5	53	24	+29	73	Promotion to Liga de Honra
2	Naval 1º Maio	34	22	6	6	65	30	+35	72	
3	UD Oliveirense	34	19	9	6	49	21	+28	66	
4	AC Cucujães	34	18	7	9	65	36	+29	61	
5	CD Alcains	34	18	4	12	55	42	+13	58	
6	Beneditense CD	34	15	8	11	45	39	+6	53	
7	Caldas SC	34	14	9	11	53	43	+10	51	
8	SL Fanhões	34	13	8	13	50	47	+3	47	
9	SCU Torreense	34	11	11	12	40	33	+7	44	
10	CD Tondela	34	11	9	14	38	46	−8	42	
11	União Coimbra	34	11	8	15	29	39	−10	41	
12	CD Torres Novas	34	9	13	12	41	44	−3	40	
13	Benfica Castelo Branco	34	9	13	12	37	46	−9	40	
14	SC Lourinhanense	34	11	7	16	34	58	−24	40	Relegation to Terceira Divisão
15	UD Vilafranquense	34	10	8	16	40	55	−15	38	Relegation to Terceira Divisão
16	GD Peniche	34	7	10	17	33	53	−20	31	Relegation to Terceira Divisão
17	Oliveira do Hospital	34	5	14	15	36	49	−13	29	Relegation to Terceira Divisão
18	CD Mafra	34	3	5	26	15	73	−58	14	Relegation to Terceira Divisão

=== Segunda Divisão - Zona Sul ===
Pos	Team	Pld	W	D	L	GF	GA	GD	Pts	Promotion or relegation
1	CD Beja	34	22	8	4	62	31	+31	74	Promotion to Liga de Honra
2	AD Machico	34	19	10	5	60	21	+39	67	
3	AD Camacha	34	18	7	9	64	34	+30	61	
4	CD Olivais e Moscavide	34	13	9	12	30	28	+2	48	
5	FC Barreirense	34	13	9	12	39	39	0	48	
6	Portimonense SC	34	12	10	12	34	42	−8	46	
7	CD Montijo	34	13	6	15	44	43	+1	45	
8	Atlético CP	34	13	6	15	44	47	−3	45	
9	Odivelas FC	34	11	11	12	37	46	−9	44	
10	União Montemor	34	10	14	10	43	46	−3	44	
11	Casa Pia AC	34	11	11	12	37	44	−7	44	
12	Oriental Lisboa	34	11	11	12	41	36	+5	44	
13	SC Olhanense	34	11	10	13	37	35	+2	43	
14	Louletano DC	34	11	10	13	33	42	−9	43	
15	CDR Quarteirense	34	10	11	13	38	39	−1	41	Relegation to Terceira Divisão
16	Silves FC	34	11	7	16	30	42	−12	40	Relegation to Terceira Divisão
17	Praiense SC	34	8	11	15	30	46	−16	35	Relegation to Terceira Divisão
18	Amora FC	34	2	13	19	22	64	−42	19	Relegation to Terceira Divisão
