= Rui Dolores =

Portuguese footballer (born 1978)

Personal information
- Full name: Rui Filipe Dolores Azevedo
- Date of birth: 2 May 1978 (age 48)
- Place of birth: São João de Ver, Portugal
- Height: 1.71 m (5 ft 7 in)
- Position: Winger

Youth career
- 1988–1996: Feirense

Senior career*
Years	Team	Apps	(Gls)
1995–1999	Feirense	46	(3)
1999–2004	Beira-Mar	137	(12)
2004–2006	Paços Ferreira	68	(8)
2006	Créteil	10	(1)
2007	Vitória Setúbal	12	(0)
2007–2008	Nea Salamis	23	(1)
2008–2009	Beira-Mar	19	(0)
2009	Arouca	6	(1)
2010	São João Ver	15	(4)
2010–2011	Boavista	13	(0)
2011–2012	Académico Viseu	9	(0)
2012–2013	Mansores	27	(1)
2015–2016	Beira-Mar	8	(2)
Total		393	(33)

International career
1995	Portugal U17	4	(0)
2001	Portugal B	1	(0)
- * Club domestic league appearances and goals

Rui Filipe Dolores Azevedo (born 2 May 1978), known as Dolores, is a Portuguese former footballer who played as a left winger.

He amassed Primeira Liga totals of 152 games and ten goals over the course of six seasons, representing three clubs, mainly Beira-Mar.

== Club career ==
Dolores was born in São João de Ver, Santa Maria da Feira. During his professional career he represented local club C.D. Feirense, S.C. Beira-Mar (two spells, the first ending in January 2004), F.C. Paços de Ferreira, US Créteil-Lusitanos (France, until December 2006), Vitória de Setúbal and Cyprus' Nea Salamis Famagusta FC.

In 2009, Dolores moved to the lower leagues with F.C. Arouca, then signed with amateurs SC São João de Ver at age 31. The following year he joined Boavista FC, with the 2001 Primeira Liga champions in the third division.
