= Pedro Pinheiro =

Portuguese footballer

Personal information
- Full name: Pedro Miguel da Câmara Pinheiro
- Date of birth: 17 February 1977 (age 49)
- Place of birth: Vila Nova de Gaia, Portugal
- Height: 1.80 m (5 ft 11 in)
- Position: Midfielder

Youth career
- 1986–1991: Porto
- 1991–1996: Candal

Senior career*
Years	Team	Apps	(Gls)
1996–1997	Candal		
1997–2000	Dragões Sandinenses		
2000–2001	Gil Vicente	15	(2)
2001–2002	Ovarense	31	(6)
2002–2005	Estoril	99	(24)
2005–2007	Belenenses	34	(1)
2007–2009	Trofense	52	(9)
2009–2011	Feirense	33	(0)
2011–2014	Salgueiros 08	85	(24)
2014–2015	Coimbrões	17	(6)
Total		356	(72)
- * Club domestic league appearances and goals

Pedro Miguel da Câmara Pinheiro (born 17 February 1977) is a Portuguese retired footballer who played as a midfielder.

== Football career ==
Pinheiro was born in Vila Nova de Gaia, Porto District. After beginning professionally with local S.C. Dragões Sandinenses, he made his Primeira Liga debuts with Barcelos-based Gil Vicente FC, spending the following campaign with A.D. Ovarense in the second division.

After three seasons with G.D. Estoril Praia, Pinheiro moved to C.F. Os Belenenses: regularly used in his first year, he only appeared in 11 games in the second. Subsequently, he would be essential in C.D. Trofense's first ever top level promotion, scoring six goals while playing in all 30 matches.

In June 2009, utility player Pinheiro returned to division two, signing with C.D. Feirense. Regularly used in his debut season, he only featured in seven contests in the following as the Santa Maria da Feira club returned to the top flight after a 23-year absence, being released shortly after at the age of 34 and resuming his career in the regional leagues.
