= Ricardo Sousa =

Portuguese football manager and former player

Personal information
- Full name: Ricardo André de Pinho Sousa
- Date of birth: 11 January 1979 (age 47)
- Place of birth: São João da Madeira, Portugal
- Height: 1.75 m (5 ft 9 in)
- Position: Attacking midfielder

Team information
- Current team: Petrolul Ploiești (head coach)

Youth career
- 1988–1997: Sanjoanense
- 1997–1998: Porto

Senior career*
Years	Team	Apps	(Gls)
1998–2002	Porto	1	(0)
1999	→ Beira-Mar (loan)	14	(5)
1999–2002	Porto B	6	(1)
1999–2000	→ Santa Clara (loan)	17	(2)
2000–2001	→ Beira-Mar (loan)	27	(11)
2001	→ Belenenses (loan)	14	(2)
2002–2003	Beira-Mar	33	(11)
2003–2004	Boavista	32	(14)
2004–2007	Hannover 96	18	(1)
2005	→ De Graafschap (loan)	10	(0)
2006–2007	→ Boavista (loan)	16	(2)
2007	Omonia	4	(0)
2008	Kickers Offenbach	16	(1)
2008	Beira-Mar	6	(0)
2009	União Leiria	4	(0)
2009–2010	Drava Ptuj	6	(1)
2010–2011	Oliveirense	15	(2)
2012–2013	São João Ver	4	(1)
2013–2015	Gafanha	34	(8)
Total		277	(62)

International career
1995	Portugal U16	3	(0)
1997	Portugal U17	5	(0)
1997–1998	Portugal U18	14	(3)
1998–1999	Portugal U20	11	(3)
2000–2002	Portugal U21	4	(2)
2003	Portugal B	2	(0)

Managerial career
- 2015: Sanjoanense
- 2016–2017: Lusitano VRSA
- 2017: Anadia
- 2018–2019: Felgueiras 1932
- 2019–2021: Beira-Mar
- 2021–2023: Mafra
- 2023–2024: Feirense
- 2024: Al-Ain
- 2025: Vizela
- 2026–: Petrolul Ploiești
- * Club domestic league appearances and goals

Ricardo André de Pinho Sousa (born 11 January 1979) is a Portuguese former professional footballer who played as an attacking midfielder. He is currently manager of Liga I club Petrolul Ploiești.

He scored 47 goals in 154 matches in the Primeira Liga over seven seasons, representing Porto, Beira-Mar, Santa Clara, Belenenses and Boavista. He scored the only goal of the 1999 Taça de Portugal final for Beira-Mar, and also played in Germany, the Netherlands, Cyprus and Slovenia.

Sousa began coaching in 2015, managing clubs including Beira-Mar and taking Mafra to the cup semi-finals in 2022.

== Club career ==
Sousa was born in São João da Madeira. Growing up as a footballer in FC Porto, he would play only three games for its first team – a 0–0 Primeira Liga draw against C.D. Santa Clara and two UEFA Champions League appearances, twice as a substitute – and went on to represent S.C. Beira-Mar, where he made his top-division debut in the second part of the 1998–99 season, Santa Clara and C.F. Os Belenenses in consecutive loans; on 16 June 1999, he scored arguably the most important goal of his career as the Aveiro club defeated S.C. Campomaiorense 1–0 to win the Taça de Portugal.

Sousa was finally released by Porto in July 2002, returning to Beira-Mar and representing Boavista F.C. in the following campaign. He netted 14 times for a team that only achieved 32, one of the worst records in that year's top flight.

Subsequently, Sousa left Boavista, signing for three years with German club Hannover 96. He spent the second half of 2004–05 on loan to De Graafschap of the Dutch Eredivisie and the whole of the 2006–07 season in the Portuguese top tier with Boavista, also on loan.

In summer 2007, Sousa joined Cypriot First Division's AC Omonia. The following January, he returned to Germany and joined 2. Bundesliga side Kickers Offenbach, starting in all 16 appearances he made and providing five assists in an eventual relegation.

Sousa split the 2008–09 campaign in Segunda Liga, starting with Beira-Mar and signing for U.D. Leiria in January 2009. After contributing only four matches and 138 minutes to the latter's return to the division, he moved abroad again, now with NK Drava Ptuj in Slovenia. In July 2010, he returned to Portugal's division two with U.D. Oliveirense, before ending his playing career in the lower leagues with SC São João de Ver and G.D. Gafanha.

== International career ==
Sousa represented Portugal at the 1999 FIFA World Youth Championship, scoring once against South Korea and playing all four matches.

== Coaching career ==
Sousa began coaching in the third tier with A.D. Sanjoanense in 2015; he had left his hometown club as a teenager 18 years earlier. In August 2016, he was hired for one season at Lusitano F.C. in the same league. During his year in Vila Real de Santo António, they won the Algarve Football Association Cup with a 2–1 victory over C.D.R. Quarteirense.

In June 2017, Sousa returned to his home district by joining Anadia FC, leaving at the turn of the year due to a "new project"; this turned out to be at F.C. Felgueiras 1932, where he succeeded Horácio Gonçalves at the fifth-placed side. After play-off elimination by S.C. Farense, he signed a new contract in May.

Sousa returned to Beira-Mar in June 2019, with the team having just been promoted from the Aveiro Football Association's district leagues. He left by mutual accord 18 months later, as they eventually went back down.

On 16 April 2021, Sousa was hired in his first professional managerial post, taking over at tenth-placed C.D. Mafra in the second division after the resignation of Filipe Cândido. He debuted two days later in a goalless draw at Oliveirense. In his first full season, he guided his side to the quarter-finals of the national cup for the first time, with a 3–1 home defeat of top-flight Moreirense F.C. with one man fewer. In the next round, they ousted Portimonense S.C. of the same tier with a 4–2 away win.

Sousa took over second-tier club C.D. Feirense on 23 June 2023. The following 3 April, he left by mutual consent as they stood 15th, seriously threatened with relegation.

On 14 August 2024, Sousa was appointed as manager of Saudi First Division League's Al-Ain FC. He resigned in October, due to the club's severe economic problems.

== Personal life ==
Sousa was the son of another footballer – and midfielder – António Sousa, who played club football in the 1980s for Porto and Sporting CP, also being a mainstay with the national team during that decade. After retiring, he went on to have a lengthy spell in management, coaching Ricardo at Beira-Mar in four different stints (1998–99, 2000–01, 2002–03 and 2008).

His son Afonso was also involved in the sport, and they were also related to fellow footballer José Sousa.

== Managerial statistics ==
As of 21 November 2026

Managerial record by team and tenure
Team	From	To	Record							
Team	From	To	G	W	D	L	GF	GA	GD	Win %
Sanjoanense	1 July 2015	11 November 2015	12	6	3	3	23	21	+2	50.00
Lusitano VRSA	10 August 2016	30 May 2017	40	21	8	11	67	45	+22	52.50
Anadia	7 June 2017	18 December 2017	17	8	5	4	28	14	+14	47.06
Felgueiras 1932	10 January 2018	10 June 2019	54	33	8	13	104	54	+50	61.11
Beira-Mar	10 June 2019	22 February 2021	48	20	13	15	72	47	+25	41.67
Mafra	16 April 2021	7 February 2023	74	25	22	27	90	100	−10	33.78
Feirense	23 June 2023	3 April 2024	30	8	5	17	27	42	−15	26.67
Al-Ain	15 August 2024	28 October 2024	8	1	3	4	5	10	−5	12.50
Vizela	6 June 2025	9 December 2025	14	5	5	4	19	16	+3	35.71
Petrolul Ploiești	7 June 2026	Present	19	11	3	5	30	21	+9	57.89
Career totals			316	138	75	103	465	370	+95	43.67

== Honours ==
Beira-Mar

- Taça de Portugal: 1989–99

Porto

- Supertaça Cândido de Oliveira: 1999
