= Capucho (footballer) =

Portuguese footballer and manager

Personal information
- Full name: Nuno Fernando Gonçalves da Rocha
- Date of birth: 21 February 1972 (age 54)
- Place of birth: Barcelos, Portugal
- Height: 1.80 m (5 ft 11 in)
- Position: Winger

Youth career
- 1984–1990: Gil Vicente

Senior career*
Years	Team	Apps	(Gls)
1989–1992	Gil Vicente	51	(2)
1992–1995	Sporting CP	65	(10)
1995–1997	Vitória Guimarães	65	(15)
1997–2003	Porto	188	(32)
2003–2004	Rangers	22	(5)
2004–2005	Celta	19	(0)
Total		410	(64)

International career
1991	Portugal U20	8	(1)
1992–1994	Portugal U21	20	(2)
1996	Portugal Olympic (O.P.)	5	(1)
1996–2002	Portugal	34	(4)

Managerial career
- 2010–2014: Porto (youth)
- 2014–2015: Porto B (assistant)
- 2015–2016: Varzim
- 2016: Rio Ave
- 2017–2018: Varzim
- 2019: Mafra
- 2020–2021: Covilhã
- 2022–2024: Porto (youth)
- 2025–2026: Varzim
Medal record
Men's football
Representing Portugal
UEFA European Championship
Bronze medal – third place	2000 Belgium-Netherlands
FIFA U-20 World Cup
Winner	1991 Portugal
UEFA European Under-21 Championship
Runner-up	1994 France
- * Club domestic league appearances and goals

Nuno Fernando Gonçalves da Rocha (born 21 February 1972), known as Capucho (Portuguese pronunciation: [kɐˈpuʃu]), is a Portuguese former professional footballer who played as a winger. He is currently a manager.

Blessed with both scoring and dribbling ability alike, he also displayed good defensive and tackling skills. His 15-year career was mainly associated with Porto (although he also represented Sporting CP), with which he won a total of 13 major titles, having appeared in 368 Primeira Liga games over 13 seasons, scoring 59 goals.

For Portugal, Capucho appeared in one World Cup and one European Championship, both in the early 2000s.

== Club career ==
Capucho was born in Barcelos. After starting with his hometown's Gil Vicente he moved to Sporting CP, where he would be relatively used during his three-year spell, helping the Lisbon team to the 1995 Taça de Portugal.

After two seasons with Guimarães' Vitória, Capucho joined Porto, being a major part of a side that won three Primeira Liga titles and the 2002–03 UEFA Cup, starting in the final against Celtic. His worst domestic output came precisely that season, scoring four goals in 27 matches as the northerners won the treble.

Capucho would leave Porto prior to the conquest of the UEFA Champions League, having appeared in nearly 250 official games with the club. He retired in 2005 at the age of 32, following one-year spells with Scotland's Rangers and Celta de Vigo of the Spanish Segunda División.

== International career ==
With 34 caps for Portugal, Capucho played more defensively for the nation than while at Porto, appearing at UEFA Euro 2000 (two late substitute appearances and a start against Germany, when Portugal were already qualified) and the 2002 FIFA World Cup (replacing Sérgio Conceição in the 4–0 thrashing of Poland). After Luiz Felipe Scolari took over as national team boss in early 2003, he was never called up again.

In 1991, Capucho only missed one game as the under-20s (which also included Rui Costa, Luís Figo and João Pinto) won the FIFA World Cup, played on home soil.

== Coaching career ==
Capucho returned to Porto in the summer of 2007, being charged with training its junior sides for several years. His first job at the professional level occurred in 2015–16, when he led newly promoted Varzim to the ninth place (from 24 teams) in the Segunda Liga. He subsequently moved to the top flight with neighbours Rio Ave, being fired on 10 November 2016 due to poor results.

In October 2017, Capucho returned to Varzim. He left in December of the following year, by mutual consent.

On 8 April 2019, Capucho was appointed at Mafra who were eighth in the second division following a run of nine games without a win that cost the job of Filipe Pedro. He won one and drew two of their five remaining matches, then chose to part ways.

Capucho succeeded Daúto Faquirá at Covilhã on 25 September 2020, after they lost their first three games of the new season. He left the following 9 February, with the team three points above the relegation zone despite a fixture backlog; he had started with a seven-game unbeaten run and concluded with an eight-game winless streak.

Capucho returned to Porto in July 2022, being in charge of the under-19 squad for two seasons. On 29 December 2025, he began a third spell at the helm of Varzim, with the club now competing in Liga 3.

== Career statistics ==
=== Club ===
Appearances and goals by club, season and competition
Club	Season	League		Cup		Europe		Other (Note: Includes Scottish League Cup and Supertaça Cândido de Oliveira)		Total	
Club	Season	Apps	Goals	Apps	Goals	Apps	Goals	Apps	Goals	Apps	Goals
Gil Vicente	1990–91	20	0			—		—		20	0
Gil Vicente	1991–92	30	2			—		—		30	2
Gil Vicente	Total	50	2			0	0	0	0	50	2
Sporting CP	1992–93	27	3	4	0	2	0	—		33	3
Sporting CP	1993–94	25	6	6	2	5	0	—		36	8
Sporting CP	1994–95	13	1	2	3	1	0	—		16	4
Sporting CP	Total	65	10	12	5	8	0	0	0	85	15
Vitória Guimarães	1995–96	33	8	4	0	4	0	—		41	8
Vitória Guimarães	1996–97	32	7	1	0	4	0	—		37	7
Vitória Guimarães	Total	65	15	5	0	8	0	0	0	78	15
Porto	1997–98	32	5	5	1	5	0	2	0	44	6
Porto	1998–99	33	6	1	0	5	0	2	1	41	7
Porto	1999–00	32	6	4	0	13	1	2	0	51	7
Porto	2000–01	33	6	3	3	11	0	2	0	49	9
Porto	2001–02	31	5	2	1	15	2	1	0	49	8
Porto	2002–03	27	4	4	1	7	1	—		38	6
Porto	Total	188	32	19	6	56	4	9	1	272	43
Rangers	2003–04	22	5	2	0	6	0	3	1	33	6
Celta	2004–05	19	0	0	0	—		—		19	0
Career total		409	64	38	11	78	4	12	2	537	81

Capucho: International goals
No.	Date	Venue	Opponent	Score	Result	Competition
1	5 June 1999	Estádio José Alvalade (1956), Lisbon, Portugal	Slovakia	1–0	1–0	Euro 2000 qualifying
2	2 June 2000	Estádio Municipal de Chaves, Chaves, Portugal	Wales	3–0	3–0	Friendly

== Honours ==
Sporting CP

- Taça de Portugal: 1994–95

Porto

- Primeira Liga: 1997–98, 1998–99, 2002–03
- Taça de Portugal: 1997–98, 1999–2000, 2000–01, 2002–03
- Supertaça Cândido de Oliveira: 1998, 1999, 2001
- UEFA Cup: 2002–03

Portugal U20

- FIFA U-20 World Cup: 1991
