= Rubens Júnior =

Brazilian footballer

Personal information
- Full name: Rubens Rodrigues dos Santos Júnior
- Date of birth: January 8, 1975 (age 51)
- Place of birth: Taubaté, Brazil
- Height: 1.78 m (5 ft 10 in)
- Position: Left-back

Youth career
- 1994–1995: Taubaté

Senior career*
Years	Team	Apps	(Gls)
1995	Taubaté		
1995	Palmeiras		
1996	→ Bragantino (loan)		
1997	→ Guarani (loan)		
1998	→ Coritiba (loan)		
1999	Palmeiras		
1999–2000	Porto		
2000	→ Atlético Paranaense (loan)		
2001	Porto		
2002	→ Botafogo (loan)		
2002–2004	→ Vitória de Guimarães (loan)		
2005	Coritiba		
2006	Corinthians		
2007	Vasco da Gama		
- * Club domestic league appearances and goals

Rubens Rodrigues dos Santos Júnior or simply Rubens Júnior (born January 8, 1975) is a Brazilian former professional footballer who played as a left-back. On 25 January 2004, whilst playing for Vitória de Guimarães, he played in a 1–0 home loss against Benfica, a game overshadowed by the death of Benfica's Miklós Fehér.

== Honours ==
Palmeiras

- Copa Libertadores: 1999

Atlético Paranaense

- Paraná State League: 2000

Porto

- Portuguese Cup: 1999–2000, 2000–01
- Portuguese SuperCup: 1999, 2001
