= Carlos Chaínho =

Angolan-born Portuguese footballer

Personal information
- Full name: Carlos Narciso Chaínho
- Date of birth: 10 July 1974 (age 52)
- Place of birth: Luanda, Angola
- Height: 1.80 m (5 ft 11 in)
- Position: Defensive midfielder

Youth career
- 1987–1990: Carcavelos
- 1990–1993: Casa Pia

Senior career*
Years	Team	Apps	(Gls)
1993–1994	Casa Pia		
1994–1998	Estrela Amadora	109	(5)
1998–2001	Porto	73	(5)
2001–2002	Zaragoza	20	(1)
2002–2003	Panathinaikos	6	(0)
2003–2005	Marítimo	62	(2)
2005–2007	Nacional	55	(2)
2007–2008	Alki Larnaca	30	(2)
2009	Shahin Bushehr		
Total		355	(17)

International career
1994–1995	Portugal U21	4	(0)
- * Club domestic league appearances and goals

Carlos Narciso Chaínho (born 10 July 1974) is a Portuguese former professional footballer who played as a defensive midfielder.

== Club career ==
Chaínho was born in Luanda, Portuguese Angola. After having played for modest clubs in the Lisbon area while growing up, Chaínho started professionally at C.F. Estrela da Amadora, moving in 1998 to the Primeira Liga with FC Porto. His best individual season at the latter side was in 1999–2000 when he started in 25 of the 28 league matches he appeared in and scored twice, but they lost the championship to Sporting CP.

In 2001, Chaínho had his first overseas experience, in Spain with Real Zaragoza, travelling to Greece in summer 2002 to work with Fernando Santos (a coach he knew well from his Estrela and Porto days) at Panathinaikos FC. After a very poor season overall – the team failed to win any silverware and he only appeared six times in the Super League – he returned to Portugal in 2003, playing four years in Madeira, two with C.S. Marítimo and two more with C.D. Nacional; the latter released him in July 2007, and the 33-year-old subsequently signed for Alki Larnaca FC of Cyprus.

Chaínho spent the first half of the 2008–09 campaign as a free agent, joining Iran's Shahin Bushehr F.C. in February 2009. He retired shortly after, having amassed Portuguese top-flight totals of 299 games and 14 goals.

== International career ==
Chaínho appeared for Portugal at under-21 level. In 2006, he received a call-up from the Angola national team, but FIFA confirmed that he was not eligible to represent countries other than the former, due to the regulation at that time.

== Honours ==
Porto

- Primeira Liga: 1998–99
- Taça de Portugal: 1999–2000, 2000–01
- Supertaça Cândido de Oliveira: 1998, 1999; runner-up: 2000
