= Fernando Pires (footballer, born 1969) =

Portuguese footballer (born 1969)

Personal information
- Full name: Fernando Jorge Ferreira Pires
- Date of birth: 18 January 1969 (age 57)
- Place of birth: N'zeto, Portuguese Angola
- Height: 1.72 m (5 ft 8 in)
- Positions: Attacking midfielder; central midfielder

Youth career
- 1982–1987: Braga

Senior career*
Years	Team	Apps	(Gls)
1986–1987	Braga	5	(0)
1987–1988	Felgueiras		
1988–1995	Braga	179	(24)
1995–1996	Marítimo	20	(3)
1996–1997	Vitória de Setúbal	13	(1)
1997–2000	Moreirense	71	(8)
2000–2001	Vizela	24	(3)

Managerial career
- 2014–2015: EF Fernando Pires (U-17)
- 2015–2016: Lomarense (U-19)
- 2017–2018: GDC Salto
- 2018–2019: Merelinense (U-15)
- 2019–2021: Merelinense (U-17)
- 2021–2022: Maximinense (U-19)
- 2022–2023: S.Paio D'Arcos
- Condor SC
- * Club domestic league appearances and goals

Fernando Jorge Ferreira Pires (born 18 January 1969) is a football manager and former player, most notably with Braga. Born in Angola, he represented Portugal internationally.

== Club career ==
Pires spent the years 1986 to 1995 with Braga, except for the 1987–88 season in Felgueiras. Playing over 200 games across all competitions, he also captained the team.

Pires made his professional debut in the Primeira Liga for Braga on 5 October 1986 as a starter in a 1–0 loss to Belenenses. Over his career, he played 217 games on the top level of Portuguese club football.

== International ==
He represented Portugal at the 1986 UEFA European Under-16 Championship.
