= Fernando Santos (footballer, born 1954) =

Portuguese football manager

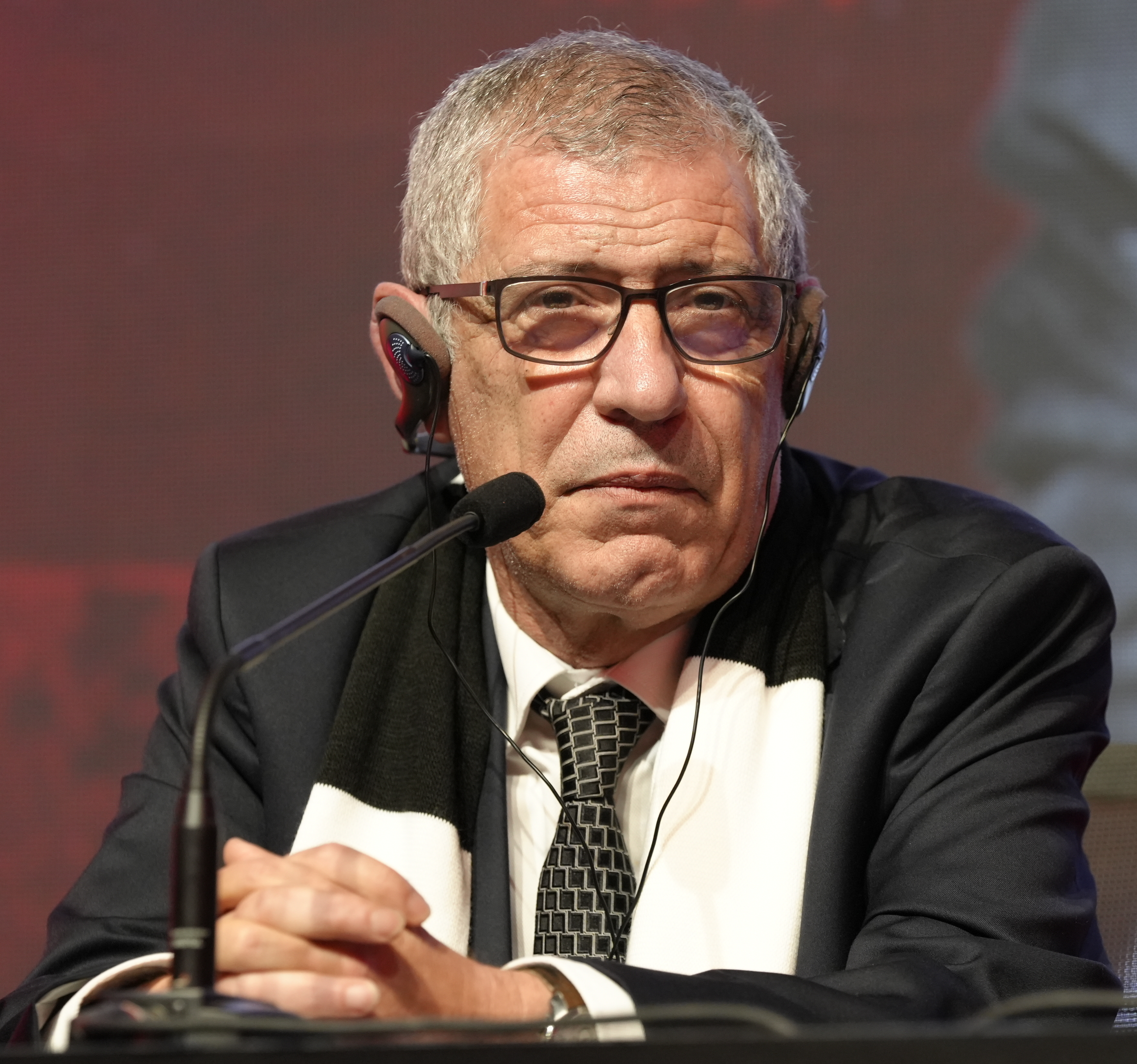
- Santos as Beşiktaş manager in 2024

Personal information
- Full name: Fernando Manuel Fernandes da Costa Santos
- Date of birth: 10 October 1954 (age 72)
- Place of birth: Lisbon, Portugal
- Height: 1.82 m (6 ft 0 in)
- Position: Left-back

Youth career
- 1970–1971: Operário Lisboa
- 1971–1973: Benfica

Senior career*
Years	Team	Apps	(Gls)
1973–1979	Estoril	91	(2)
1979–1980	Marítimo	26	(0)
1980–1987	Estoril	125	(2)
Total		242	(4)

Managerial career
- 1987–1988: Estoril (assistant)
- 1988–1994: Estoril
- 1994–1998: Estrela Amadora
- 1998–2001: Porto
- 2001–2002: AEK Athens
- 2002: Panathinaikos
- 2003–2004: Sporting CP
- 2004–2006: AEK Athens
- 2006–2007: Benfica
- 2007–2010: PAOK
- 2010–2014: Greece
- 2014–2022: Portugal
- 2023: Poland
- 2024: Beşiktaş
- 2024–2025: Azerbaijan
Medal record
Men's football
Representing Portugal (manager)
UEFA European Championship
Winner	2016 France
UEFA Nations League
Winner	2019 Portugal
FIFA Confederations Cup
Bronze medal – third place	2017 Russia
- * Club domestic league appearances and goals

Fernando Manuel Fernandes da Costa Santos GOM (born 10 October 1954) is a Portuguese professional football manager and former player who played as a left-back.

He amassed Primeira Liga totals of 161 games and two goals over eight seasons, almost always with Estoril. After retiring, he worked as a coach for several decades, starting out at his main club in 1988.

Santos managed Portugal's Big Three, winning five major titles with Porto. For the better part of the 2000s he worked in Greece, mainly with AEK Athens and PAOK. In 2010, he was appointed at the helm of the Greece national team, coaching them in a World Cup and one European Championship. Subsequently, he led Portugal to victory in the Euro 2016 and the 2019 Nations League, which were the first two major titles in the nation's history, before leaving in 2022. The following year, he took over as manager of Poland, being dismissed in September.

Following a brief spell back in club management with Besiktas, Santos became Azerbaijan's coach in June 2024.

== Playing career ==
Born in Lisbon, Santos finished his development with Benfica, having joined its youth system at the age of 16. His senior debut was made with Estoril, which he went on to represent in the two major levels of Portuguese football.

Santos made his Primeira Liga debut on 7 September 1975, playing the full 90 minutes in a 2–0 home win against Farense. He finished his first season with a further 12 appearances, helping his team to the eighth position.

Santos scored his first goals in the top division in the 1978–79 campaign, only missing one league game in an eventual 11th-place finish. For 1979–80, he moved to Marítimo, where he was also first choice. Having returned to his previous club, he played with them a further eight years (five being spent in the Segunda Liga) before retiring at the age of 33.

== Coaching career ==
=== Estoril and Porto ===
Santos started working as a manager immediately after retiring. He helped Estoril return to the top tier in 1991 and, in the following ten years, only worked in that competition, being in charge of Estrela da Amadora and Porto.

Having signed for the latter side in summer 1998, Santos won the national championship and the Portuguese Supercup in his first season. He finished second in the following to Sporting CP, and led the team to the quarter-finals of the UEFA Champions League.

=== Greece and Sporting CP ===
In 2001, Santos was appointed at AEK Athens in the Super League Greece, winning the domestic cup and losing the league to Olympiacos on goal difference. Staying in the country, he then joined Panathinaikos, leaving by mutual consent after only four months.

Santos returned to his country for the 2003–04 campaign, replacing László Bölöni at the helm of Sporting. He was relieved of his duties on 2 June 2004, after his team was only able to rank third.

From 2004 to 2006, Santos again managed AEK. He led them to consecutive top-three finishes during his tenure, being voted Manager of the Year in 2005.

=== Benfica ===
On 20 May 2006, Santos joined former youth club Benfica. He was responsible for the signing of former AEK player Kostas Katsouranis the following month.

After a third place in his debut season, only two points behind champions Porto, Santos witnessed the departure of captain and top scorer Simão Sabrosa to Atlético Madrid during pre-season. On 20 August 2007, after a 1–1 away draw against Leixões, he was sacked and replaced with José Antonio Camacho.

=== PAOK ===
Santos returned to Greece and its top flight in early September 2007, signing a three-year contract with PAOK. There, he joined forces with director of football – and former international – Theodoros Zagorakis, leading the team to the second position in 2009–10.

On 19 May 2010, despite a chance of competing again in the Champions League, Santos announced his decision of leaving the Thessaloniki-based side in a press conference.

=== Greece national team ===
On 1 July 2010, Santos was named the new coach of the Greece national team, succeeding longtime incumbent Otto Rehhagel on a two-year deal. Having been named the country's Coach of the Year all sports included, he subsequently qualified for the UEFA Euro 2012 tournament, reaching the last-eight stage.

Santos was also in charge during the 2014 FIFA World Cup in Brazil, as Greece reached the knockout stage for the first time ever. Shortly before the start of the penalty shootout against Costa Rica, eventually lost 5–3, he was sent off by referee Ben Williams for apparent dissent. He watched the decision unfold on a television from inside the stadium, and the defeat marked the end of his tenure as his contract expired the very next day; he was initially banned for eight matches for the incident, reduced to six upon appeal.

=== Portugal national team ===
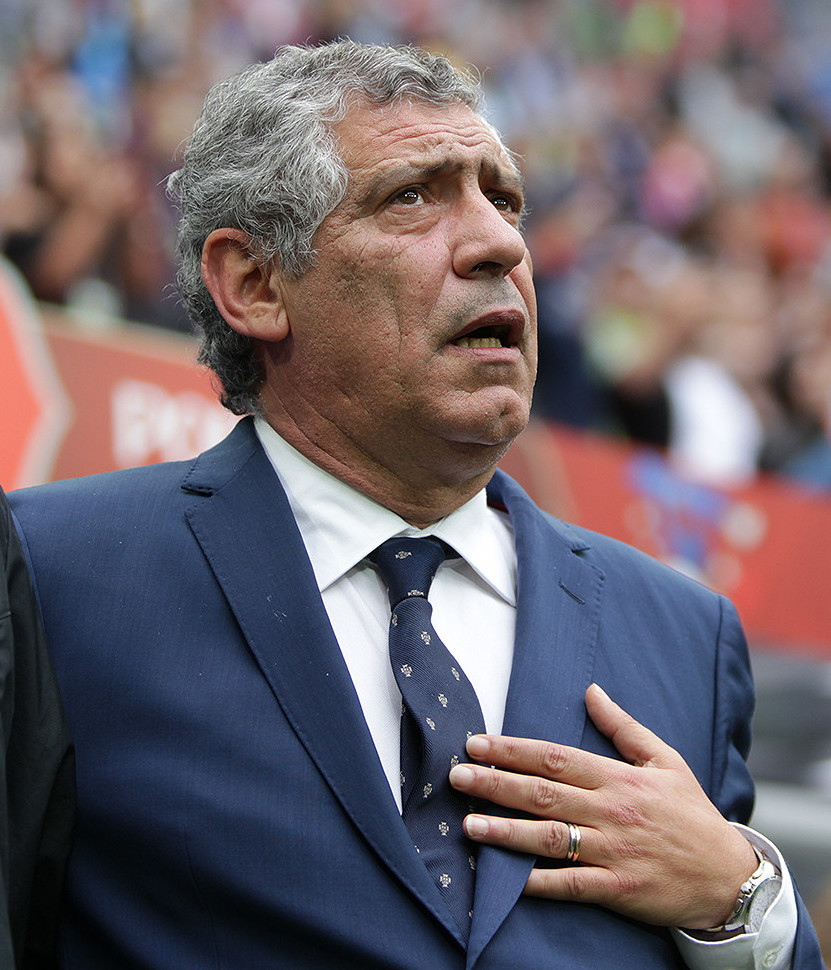
Santos with Portugal at the 2017 FIFA Confederations Cup

On 23 September 2014, Santos was chosen as the new manager of Portugal, after Paulo Bento was fired due to poor results. His first game in charge took place on 14 October in a 1–0 win in Denmark for the Euro 2016 qualifiers, and the side went on to reach the finals in France; during his suspension, it was Ilídio Vale that sat on the bench.

On 10 July 2016, after three group stage draws that enabled group stage qualification as third, Santos coached Portugal to its first-ever major international conquest, after a 1–0 extra time defeat of the hosts. The only win in 90 minutes occurred in the semi-finals, against Wales.

On 10 October 2017, the day of his 63rd birthday, Santos coached Portugal to a 2–0 win over Switzerland at the Estádio da Luz, which enabled them to finish the 2018 World Cup qualifying campaign with nine wins in ten games. In the finals in Russia, the tournament ended at the round-of-16 stage after a 2–1 loss against Uruguay.

After conquering the 2018–19 UEFA Nations League, Santos led the national team to the round of 16 at Euro 2020, where they lost 1–0 to Belgium. In the 2022 World Cup, after being disrespected by star forward Cristiano Ronaldo in the last group fixture against South Korea as he was replaced (2–1 loss), he decided to bench him for the knockout phase, beating Switzerland 6–1 in the last 16, their highest tally in a World Cup at that stage since 1966, with Ronaldo's replacement Gonçalo Ramos scoring a hat-trick, but being ousted by Morocco in the next round; on 15 December, following constant criticism over his defensive tactics and style of play, he was dismissed.

=== Poland national team ===
On 24 January 2023, Santos was unveiled as the new manager of Poland, succeeding Czesław Michniewicz who left the team shortly after the 2022 World Cup. Criticised for his style, his choice of players and his lack of appearances at Polish league and cup matches, defeats to Moldova and Albania in the Euro 2024 qualifying phase led to fans starting to demand his dismissal, which took place on 13 September.

=== Beşiktaş ===
Santos returned to club duties on 7 January 2024, signing for Beşiktaş in the Turkish Süper Lig. He was fired on 13 April, following a six-game winless streak.

=== Azerbaijan national team ===
On 12 June 2024, Santos was officially appointed at the Azerbaijan national side, having been assigned the task of helping to qualify for Euro 2028. On 8 September 2025, having collected nine losses in 11 matches, he was relieved of his duties.

== Personal life ==
Santos earned a degree in electrical and telecommunications engineering, awarded in 1977 by the Instituto Superior de Engenharia de Lisboa. As he was in charge when Porto won its fifth consecutive championship in 1999, he was nicknamed Engenheiro do Penta (Penta's engineer).

In addition to his native Portuguese, Santos also speaks English and Greek.

== Managerial statistics ==
As of match played 5 September 2025

Managerial record by team and tenure
Team	Nat	From	To	Record				
Team	Nat	From	To	G	W	D	L	Win %
Estoril	(Portugal)	19 January 1988	7 March 1994	230	81	72	77	35.22
Estrela da Amadora	(Portugal)	22 November 1994	4 June 1998	133	39	45	49	29.32
Porto	(Portugal)	4 June 1998	8 June 2001	156	98	31	27	62.82
AEK Athens	(Greece)	17 June 2001	9 May 2002	51	38	5	8	74.51
Panathinaikos	(Greece)	18 May 2002	16 October 2002	9	6	0	3	66.67
Sporting CP	(Portugal)	3 June 2003	2 June 2004	40	26	5	9	65.00
AEK Athens	(Greece)	16 July 2004	14 May 2006	86	47	23	16	54.65
Benfica	(Portugal)	20 May 2006	20 August 2007	49	29	11	9	59.18
PAOK	(Greece)	4 September 2007	18 May 2010	114	58	24	32	50.88
Greece	(Greece)	1 July 2010	1 July 2014	49	26	17	6	53.06
Portugal	(Portugal)	24 September 2014	15 December 2022	109	67	23	19	61.47
Poland	(Poland)	24 January 2023	13 September 2023	6	3	0	3	50.00
Beşiktaş	(Turkey)	7 January 2024	13 April 2024	16	7	4	5	43.75
Azerbaijan	(Azerbaijan)	12 June 2024	8 September 2025	11	0	2	9	0.00
Career totals				1,075	532	266	277	49.49

== Honours ==
=== Manager ===
Porto

- Primeira Liga: 1998–99
- Taça de Portugal: 1999–2000, 2000–01
- Supertaça Cândido de Oliveira: 1998, 1999

AEK Athens

- Greek Football Cup: 2001–02

Portugal

- UEFA European Championship: 2016
- UEFA Nations League: 2018–19
- FIFA Confederations Cup third place: 2017

Individual

- Super League Greece Manager of the Season: 2001–02, 2004–05, 2008–09, 2009–10
- Super League Greece Manager of the Decade: 2000–10
- Best Sports Coach in Greece: 2011, 2013
- IFFHS World's Best National Coach: 2016, 2019
- The Best FIFA Men's Coach: 2016 (Third place)
- Globos de Ouro – Best Male Coach: 2017
- PFA Platinum Quinas: 2019

=== Orders ===
- Grand Officer of the Order of Merit (10 July 2016)

== See also ==
- National team managers with 100 or more matches
- List of football managers with the most matches
