= Lobão (footballer) =

Brazilian footballer (born 1972)

Personal information
- Full name: Fabrício Almeida Carvalho
- Date of birth: 21 June 1972 (age 54)
- Place of birth: Teófilo Otoni, Brazil
- Height: 1.82 m (5 ft 11 1/2 in)
- Position: Defender

Senior career*
Years	Team	Apps	(Gls)
1993–1995	Democrata-GV		
1996	Linhares		
1996–2002	Beira-Mar	180	(10)
2003	Caxias		
2003–2004	Aves	27	(0)
2004	Democrata-GV		
2005–2007	Cerezo Osaka		
2008–2009	Operário-MS		
- * Club domestic league appearances and goals

Fabrício Almeida Carvalho, known as Lobão (born 21 June 1972) is a former Brazilian football player. He also holds Portuguese citizenship.

== Club career ==
He made his Primeira Liga debut for Beira-Mar on 21 August 1998 in a game against Braga.

== Honours ==
Beira-Mar

- Taça de Portugal: 1998–99
