= Jérôme Palatsi =

French footballer (born 1969)

Personal information
- Date of birth: 10 December 1969 (age 56)
- Place of birth: Béziers, France
- Height: 1.80 m (5 ft 11 in)
- Position: Goalkeeper

Youth career
- 1986–1989: Montpellier

Senior career*
Years	Team	Apps	(Gls)
1989–1994	Montpellier	3	(0)
1990–1991	→ Alès (loan)	23	(0)
1993–1994	→ Rouen (loan)	36	(0)
1994–1995	Pau	1	(0)
1995–1996	Le Grau-du-Roi		
1996–2001	Beira-Mar	102	(3)
2001–2005	Vitória Guimarães	126	(1)
2005–2006	Moreirense	17	(0)
2006–2008	Penafiel	36	(0)
2008–2009	Beira-Mar	28	(0)
2010	Avanca	4	(0)
Total		376+	(4+)
- * Club domestic league appearances and goals

Jérôme Palatsi (born 10 December 1969) is a French former professional footballer who played as a goalkeeper.

Having had no impact in his country of birth, he spent the bulk of his senior career in Portugal, appearing in 180 Primeira Liga matches mainly at the service of Vitória de Guimarães and retiring in his 40s.

== Club career ==
Palatsi was born in Béziers, Hérault. After only three matches as a professional at Montpellier HSC over the course of five seasons (although two were spent on loan), he moved to the lower leagues in the country.

In 1996, Palatsi started a Portuguese adventure that would last nearly 15 years, starting at S.C. Beira-Mar. At the Aveiro club and his second, Vitória de Guimarães, he was sometimes charged with penalty-taking, scoring a total of four goals in the Primeira Liga.

From 2005 onwards, Palatsi played mostly in the country's Segunda Liga, first signing with Moreirense F.C. then moving to F.C. Penafiel. Aged almost 39, he returned to Beira-Mar also in that level, and retired two years later after a brief stint with amateurs A.A. Avanca.

With Beira-Mar again in the top flight, Palatsi returned to the club as goalkeeper coach. He also worked in that role with S.C. Freamunde and F.C. Felgueiras 1932. He was both head and assistant manager – as well as player – at Vitória de Guimarães's beach soccer team and acted as scout for Montpellier.

== Honours ==
Le Grau-du-Roi

- Division d'Honneur Languedoc-Roussillon: 1995–96

Beira-Mar

- Taça de Portugal: 1998–99
- Segunda Liga: 2009–10
