= Deco =

Brazilian-born Portuguese footballer (born 1977)

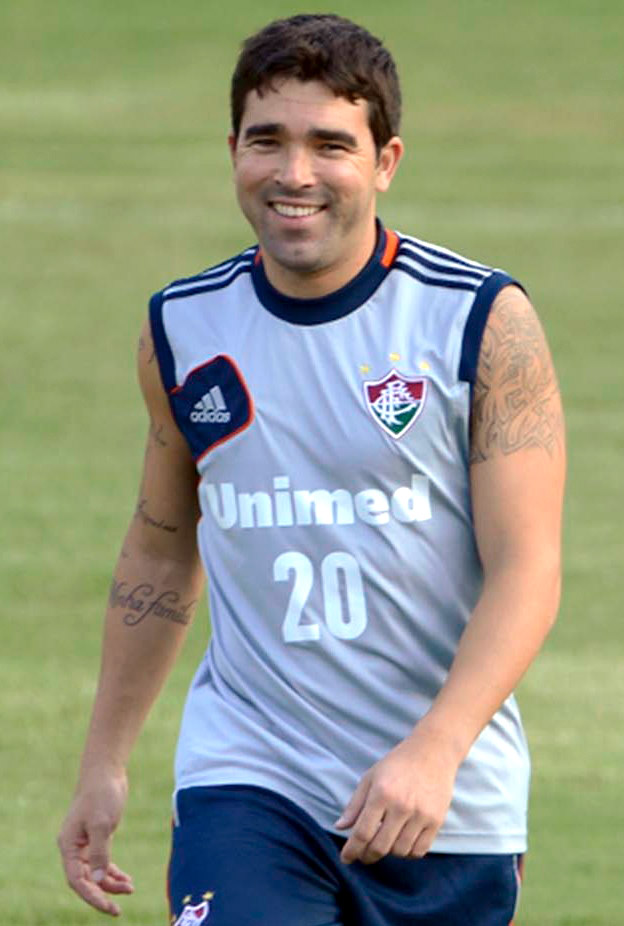
- Deco playing for Fluminense in 2013

Personal information
- Full name: Anderson Luís de Souza
- Date of birth: 27 August 1977 (age 49)
- Place of birth: São Bernardo do Campo, Brazil
- Height: 1.74 m (5 ft 9 in)
- Position: Central midfielder

Youth career
- 1995–1996: Nacional (SP)
- 1996–1997: Corinthians

Senior career*
Years	Team	Apps	(Gls)
1996–1997	Corinthians	2	(1)
1997	CSA	0	(0)
1997–1998	Benfica	0	(0)
1997–1998	→ Alverca (loan)	32	(12)
1998–1999	Salgueiros	12	(2)
1999–2004	Porto	148	(32)
2004–2008	Barcelona	113	(11)
2008–2010	Chelsea	43	(5)
2010–2013	Fluminense	56	(2)
Total		406	(65)

International career
2003–2010	Portugal	75	(5)
Medal record
Men's football
Representing Portugal
UEFA European Championship
Runner-up	2004 Portugal
- * Club domestic league appearances and goals

Anderson Luís de Souza OIH (born 27 August 1977), also known as Deco (Portuguese pronunciation: [ˈdɛku]), is a former professional footballer who primarily played as an attacking or central midfielder. Born and raised in Brazil, he played for the Portugal national team. He currently works as sporting director for Barcelona.

Deco is one of the few players to have won the UEFA Champions League with two clubs, with Porto in 2004 and Barcelona in 2006. He also won the La Liga title with Barcelona during the 2005–06 season, playing in an attacking trio alongside Samuel Eto'o and Ronaldinho. He was named UEFA Club Footballer of the Year and UEFA Best Midfielder in Porto's Champions League-winning season and was named Man of the Match in the 2004 UEFA Champions League Final. Deco was the first player to win the UEFA Best Midfielder Award with two clubs, Porto and Barcelona. He was awarded the 2006 FIFA Club World Cup Golden Ball and the Man of the Match award in the final despite losing to Internacional.

Deco received Portuguese citizenship in 2002 having completed five years of Portuguese residence, and subsequently opted to play internationally for the Portugal national team. He earned 75 caps for them, playing at two UEFA European Championships and two FIFA World Cups, reaching the final of Euro 2004, and achieving a fourth-place finish at the 2006 World Cup.

== Club career ==
=== Early career ===
Born in São Bernardo do Campo, Deco spent time at Corinthians as a youngster, competing in the Copa São Paulo de Futebol Júnior for them. In the 1997 edition, Benfica sent Toni to scout the tournament, and he soon noticed Deco, recommending his signing. In June 1997, Benfica purchased his rights from CSA and immediately sent him on loan (along with fellow Brazilian Caju) to their farm team, Alverca. After helping them win promotion to the top tier in 1997–98 season by scoring 13 goals in 32 appearances, he returned to Benfica in July 1998. However, he left for Salgueiros in exchange for Nandinho, who went in the opposite direction. When asked by Nuno Gomes in an interview for FourFourTwo why he did not stay and become a legend at Benfica, Deco said, "Benfica decided, it wasn't my decision. They didn't want me. The coach was Graeme Souness at the time. I was young and Benfica needed some players."

At Salgueiros, Deco was plagued by injuries and only made a few appearances, until Porto purchased him in March 1999, in time to win the league title. His release from Benfica and subsequent success with Porto was considered by António Simões as an "historical mistake", while Toni stated he saw in Deco, a successor for Rui Costa the club needed since his departure.

=== Porto ===
In his first season with Porto, Deco scored a goal after just 30.08 seconds in a 1–0 away win against Molde in the 1999–2000 UEFA Champions League.

Under the guidance of manager José Mourinho in the 2002–03 season, Deco scored 10 goals in 30 matches and received 17 yellow cards and 1 red card. He was one of the key players in Porto's UEFA Cup final 3–2 win over Celtic that year. In the 2003–04 season, Deco helped Porto recapture the national title and led the team to the 2004 UEFA Champions League Final, in which Porto won 3–0 over Monaco, scoring the second goal of the match. He was the UEFA Champions League's top assist provider and also suffered the most fouls in the Champions League that season. That season, Deco also won the UEFA Club Footballer of the Year as well as the award for the best midfielder in the competition.

=== Barcelona ===
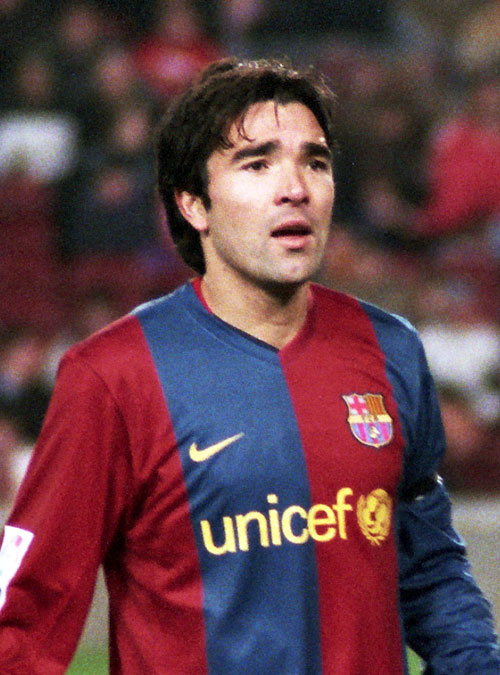
Deco playing for Barcelona in the 2006–07 season

A deal was achieved between Porto and Barcelona the day after the Euro 2004 final. Barcelona agreed on a €15 million fee in cash, plus the complete rights of Ricardo Quaresma to Porto, which tagged Quaresma for €6 million.

On 14 May 2005, Deco played in the draw against Levante, which gave Barcelona their 17th La Liga title. He also was named Barcelona's player of the season in the 2005–06 season.

Deco scored twice in the 2006 Supercopa de España, which Barça won. Deco won the UEFA Best Midfielder Award yet again for his performance in Barça's UEFA Champions League-winning season, enabling him to join the exclusive group of players that have won the same award more than once with different teams, having won the Champions League previously with Porto. He was also awarded the Golden Ball at the FIFA Club World Cup and the Man of the Match award, despite losing the final to Internacional.

=== Chelsea ===
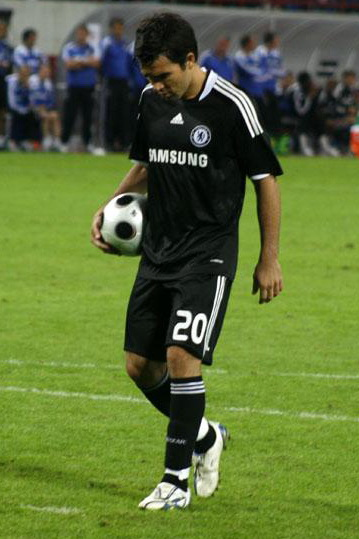
Deco taking a penalty kick for Chelsea in 2008

On 30 June 2008, Premier League team Chelsea signed Deco from Barcelona on a three-year contract for €10 million (£8 million). He was the first signing of new Chelsea coach Luiz Felipe Scolari, who was formerly the head coach of the Portugal national team.

Deco scored on his debut with a 30-yard goal in a 4–0 league victory over Portsmouth. Deco followed up his performance by scoring in his second game for Chelsea, a curling free-kick against Wigan Athletic. These performances led to him winning the Premier League Player of the Month award for August. Deco made his Champions League debut for Chelsea on 16 September. Deco injured himself during a training session, but he returned from the thigh injury on 19 October and came on as a substitute against Middlesbrough. He was sent off in the 3–1 defeat by Roma on 4 November 2008. He then scored a bicycle kick against Bolton Wanderers on 6 December.

Deco eventually lost his place in the 2008–09 starting line up, due in part to some poor performances, but also to the sacking of Scolari. In a June interview, Deco said, "I do not want to stay. I have not liked my experience at Chelsea." This was soon followed by Inter Milan, managed by former Chelsea manager José Mourinho, declaring Inter was attempting to sign Deco along with fellow countryman Ricardo Carvalho, who had also declared his desire to leave and, like Deco, desired to link-up with Mourinho again. Both players previously played under Mourinho at Porto. However, Inter club president Massimo Moratti ruled out signing either of the Portuguese internationals on the basis of their age, telling Gazzetta dello Sport, "Deco and Carvalho? They are two champions but at this time I don't feel there's a need to buy them."

=== Fluminense ===
On 6 August 2010, Deco signed a two-year contract with Brazilian club Fluminense on a free transfer, joining former Chelsea and Barcelona teammate Juliano Belletti. Playing for Fluminense, Deco won the Campeonato Brasileiro in 2010 and 2012.

On 26 August 2013, Deco retired, ending a 17-year career. The decision came on the day before his 36th birthday. His final match was four days prior, against Goiás.

== International career ==
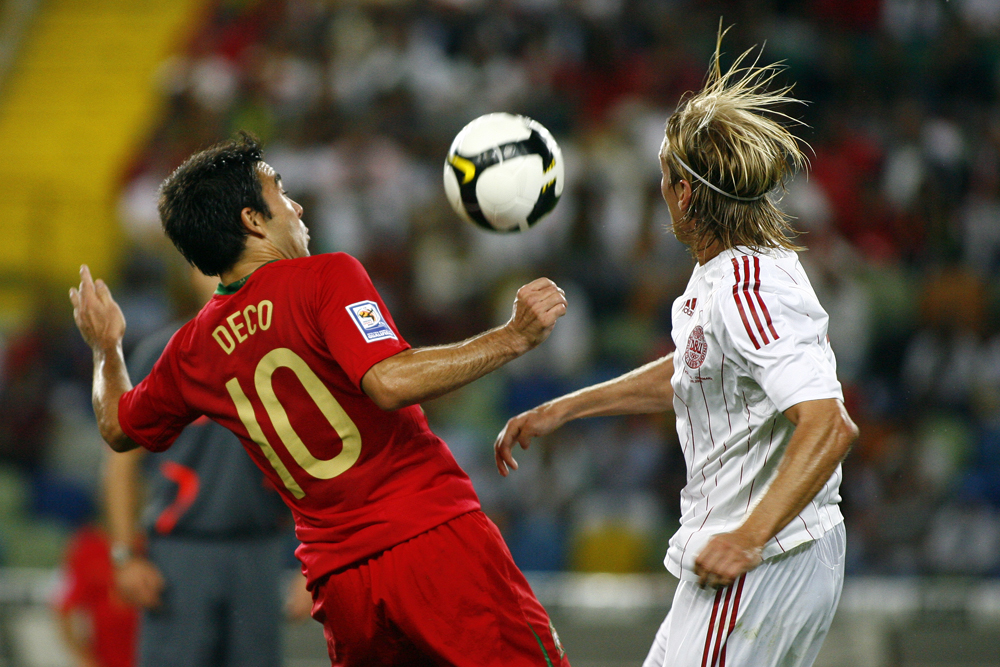
Deco playing for Portugal against Denmark in 2008

Deco was never called up to the Brazil national team, as the Brazil squad for the 2002 FIFA World Cup included other attacking midfielders such as Ronaldinho, Rivaldo and Juninho. After completing six years of residence in Portugal, he was able to gain Portuguese citizenship and play for their national team. As none of his great-grandparents, grandparents or parents were Portuguese, under FIFA's player eligibility rules his citizenship was the only factor to allow him to play for Portugal. He was subsequently mentioned several times in the media as an option for the Portugal national team.

After many months of public discussion which split Portuguese public opinion, and despite the opposition of a large number of Porto rivals' supporters, he was called up for his first international, coincidentally against Brazil. He came on as a substitute for Sérgio Conceição and scored the free-kick which won the match 2–1. This was Portugal's first win over Brazil since the 1966 FIFA World Cup. Since that match, he became a regular in the national team. Before UEFA Euro 2004, Luís Figo criticised Deco's inclusion and said, "Se você nasceu chinês, bem, você tem que jogar pela China." (English: "If you're born Chinese, well, you have to play for China.") Deco responded, "Eu nasci no Brasil e seria uma mentira dizer que sou português agora e não brasileiro. Mas amo Portugal e adoro jogar pela seleção." (English:"I was born in Brazil and it would be a lie to say that I'm Portuguese now and not Brazilian. But I love Portugal and I love playing for the national team.")

Despite the early criticism, Deco was one of the highlights of the Portugal national team. He scored 5 goals in 75 caps for Portugal by June 2010, when his international career ended after the second-round defeat to Spain at the 2010 World Cup.

=== 2006 World Cup ===
In the 2006 World Cup, Deco scored the first goal in Portugal's second Group D match against Iran in the 63rd minute prior to Cristiano Ronaldo's 80th-minute penalty. During the first knockout stage of the competition, Deco received two yellow cards in the match against the Netherlands with the first given for a rash tackle on John Heitinga, suspending him from the quarter-final win against England, as he had already picked up a caution in the match with Iran. The win against England in the quarter-final stage led to Portugal's defeat in the semi-final, which Deco was able to participate in.

=== Euro 2008 ===
On 11 June, Deco scored the opening goal in Portugal's second match of Euro 2008, a Group A clash with the Czech Republic. The match ended 3–1 to Portugal, with Deco aiding his team in their passage to the quarter-finals where Portugal's campaign came to an end against Germany, the eventual runners-up of the tournament.

In February 2010, Deco announced he would be retiring from international football after the 2010 World Cup.

=== 2010 World Cup ===
Deco played for Portugal in their opening game against the Ivory Coast. During the match, he was injured and was ruled out of the remaining two group matches, against North Korea and Brazil. He was fit again for the round of 16 match against Spain, but Portugal head coach Carlos Queiroz chose Tiago over him.

Deco retired from international football with 75 caps and 5 goals.

== Style of play ==
As a player, Deco was considered a versatile, tactically intelligent and creative midfielder with good vision and technical ability. He was initially used as a central midfielder under manager José Mourinho during his time with Porto, although he was also capable of playing as an attacking midfielder, as a deep-lying playmaker, or as a winger on either flank. While Deco lacked in pace as well as physical, defensive, and athletic attributes, he had stamina, as well as excellent ball control, dribbling skills, passing range, and crossing ability, which allowed him to beat players, find space and create chances for teammates.

A diminutive midfielder, in later years, as he lost his acceleration, agility and mobility, he also went through a physical development, which, along with his balance, allowed him to protect the ball against larger opponents. He also contributed offensively with occasional goals due to his accurate mid-range shooting ability, and his adeptness at free-kicks. Despite his talent, Deco was also known to be injury-prone and inconsistent at times, and was also accused of drifting in and out of matches. Furthermore, his work-rate and fitness were often brought into question in his later career. Deco was also well known for his tendency to commit tactical fouls, and he was accused of diving throughout his career.

== Post-retirement ==
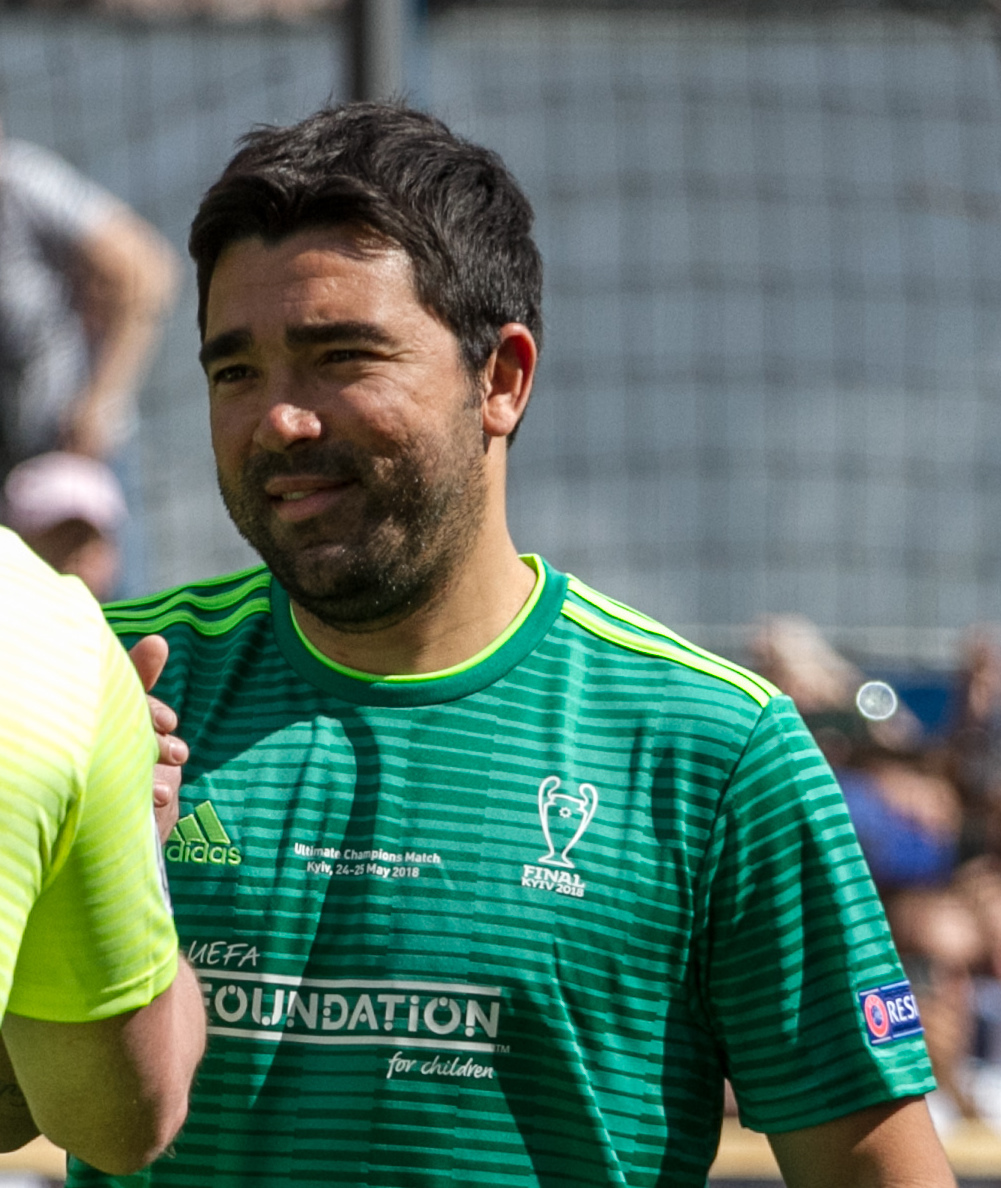
Deco in 2018

On 16 August 2023, it was announced that Deco would become the sporting director of his former club Barcelona by signing a three-year contract.

== Personal life ==
Deco is the brother-in-law of fellow former footballers Alecsandro and Richarlyson. Deco is an ambassador for the Laureus Sport for Good Foundation. He also has a charitable organisation, the Deco Institute, based in the Brazilian city of Indaiatuba, near São Paulo, where he grew up.

After retiring, Deco set up D20 Sports Management, a sports agency registered in Dublin, Ireland. The agency, whose clients include Brazil international Fabinho and Burkina Faso international Edmond Tapsoba, recorded €300,000 profit in 2017.

== Media ==
Deco features in EA Sports' FIFA football video game series. He was included in the Ultimate Team Legends in FIFA 16.

== Career statistics ==
=== Club ===
Appearances and goals by club, season and competition.

Club	Season	League			National Cup (Note: Includes the Copa do Brasil, Taça de Portugal, Copa del Rey and FA Cup)		League Cup (Note: Includes the Football League Cup)		Continental		Other		Total	
Club	Season	Division	Apps	Goals	Apps	Goals	Apps	Goals	Apps	Goals	Apps	Goals	Apps	Goals
Corinthians	1996	Série A	2	0	0	0	—		—		—		2	0
CSA	1997	Série C	0	0	1	0	—		—		—		1	0
Alverca (loan)	1997–98	Segunda Divisão	32	12	1	1	—		—		—		33	13
Salgueiros	1998–99	Primeira Divisão	12	2	1	0	—		—		—		13	2
Porto	1998–99	Primeira Divisão	6	0	0	0	—		—		—		6	0
Porto	1999–2000	Primeira Liga	23	1	4	3	—		11 (Note: Appearances in UEFA Champions League)	3	—		38	7
Porto	2000–01	Primeira Liga	31	6	4	0	—		10 (Note: Appearances in UEFA Cup)	0	2 (Note: Appearance(s) in Supertaça Cândido de Oliveira)	0	47	6
Porto	2001–02	Primeira Liga	30	13	2	0	—		15	6	1	0	48	19
Porto	2002–03	Primeira Liga	30	10	3	1	—		12	1	—		45	12
Porto	2003–04	Primeira Liga	28	2	3	0	—		12	2	2 (Note: One appearance in Supertaça Cândido de Oliveira and one appearance in UEFA Super Cup)	0	45	4
Porto	Total		148	32	16	4	—		60	12	5	0	229	48
Barcelona	2004–05	La Liga	35	7	0	0	—		7	2	—		42	9
Barcelona	2005–06	La Liga	29	2	1	0	—		11	2	2 (Note: Appearances in Supercopa de España)	0	43	4
Barcelona	2006–07	La Liga	31	1	3	0	—		8	2	5 (Note: Two appearances and one goal in FIFA Club World Cup, one appearance in UEFA Super Cup, two appearances and two goals in Supercopa de España)	3	47	6
Barcelona	2007–08	La Liga	18	1	5	0	—		6	0	—		29	1
Barcelona	Total		113	11	9	0	—		32	6	7	3	161	20
Chelsea	2008–09	Premier League	24	3	1	0	1	0	4	0	—		30	3
Chelsea	2009–10	Premier League	19	2	2	0	2	1	4	0	1 (Note: Appearance in FA Community Shield)	0	28	3
Chelsea	Total		43	5	3	0	3	1	8	0	1	0	58	6
Fluminense	2010	Série A	16	1	—		—		—		—		16	1
Fluminense	2011	Série A	18	0	0	0	—		2 (Note: Appearances in Copa Libertadores)	1	5 (Note: Appearances in Campeonato Carioca)	0	25	1
Fluminense	2012	Série A	17	1	0	0	—		8	1	11	3	36	5
Fluminense	2013	Série A	5	0	1	0	—		3	0	5	0	14	0
Fluminense	Total		56	2	1	0	—		13	2	21	3	91	7
Career total			406	64	32	5	3	1	113	20	33	6	588	96

=== International ===
Appearances and goals by national team and year

National team	Year	Apps	Goals
Portugal	2003	9	1
Portugal	2004	15	1
Portugal	2005	8	0
Portugal	2006	11	1
Portugal	2007	8	0
Portugal	2008	9	2
Portugal	2009	11	0
Portugal	2010	4	0
Total		75	5

International goals

Scores and results list Portugal's goal tally first.

#	Date	Venue	Opponent	Score	Result	Competition
1.	29 March 2003	Estádio das Antas, Porto, Portugal	Brazil	2–1	2–1	Friendly
2.	13 October 2004	Estádio José Alvalade, Lisbon, Portugal	Russia	3–0	7–1	2006 FIFA World Cup qualifying
3.	17 June 2006	Commerzbank-Arena, Frankfurt, Germany	Iran	1–0	2–0	2006 FIFA World Cup
4.	11 June 2008	Stade de Genève, Geneva, Switzerland	Czech Republic	1–0	3–1	UEFA Euro 2008
5.	10 September 2008	Estádio José Alvalade, Lisbon, Portugal	Denmark	2–1	2–3	2010 FIFA World Cup qualifying

== Honours ==
Porto

- Primeira Divisão/Liga: 1998–99, 2002–03, 2003–04
- Taça de Portugal: 1999–2000, 2000–01, 2002–03
- Supertaça Cândido de Oliveira: 2001, 2003
- UEFA Champions League: 2003–04
- UEFA Cup: 2002–03

Barcelona

- La Liga: 2004–05, 2005–06
- Supercopa de España: 2005, 2006
- UEFA Champions League: 2005–06
- FIFA Club World Cup runner-up: 2006

Chelsea

- Premier League: 2009–10
- FA Cup: 2008–09, 2009–10
- FA Community Shield: 2009

Fluminense

- Campeonato Brasileiro Série A: 2010, 2012
- Campeonato Carioca: 2012

Portugal

- UEFA European Championship runner-up: 2004

Individual

- Ballon d'Or runner-up: 2004
- UEFA Club Footballer of the Year: 2003–04
- UEFA Club Midfielder of the Year: 2003–04, 2005–06
- 2004 UEFA Champions League Final: Man of the Match
- ESM Team of the Year: 2004–05
- FIFA Club World Cup Golden Ball: 2006
- Portuguese League Footballer of the Year: 2003–04
- CNID Best Portuguese Athlete Abroad: 2006
- Premier League Player of the Month: August 2008
- Campeonato Carioca Best Player: 2012
- Campeonato Carioca Best Midfielder: 2012
- Globe Soccer Awards Player Career Award: 2013
- Golden Foot: 2016, as football legend

Orders

- Medal of Merit, Order of the Immaculate Conception of Vila Viçosa (House of Braganza)
