= Esquerdinha (footballer, born 1972) =

Brazilian footballer (1972–2018)

Personal information
- Full name: José Marcelo Januário de Araújo
- Date of birth: 6 May 1972
- Place of birth: Caiçara, Paraíba, Brazil
- Date of death: 31 October 2018 (aged 46)
- Place of death: João Pessoa, Paraíba, Brazil
- Height: 1.75 m (5 ft 9 in)
- Position: Left-back

Senior career*
Years	Team	Apps	(Gls)
1990–1991	Santos-PB		
1992–1993	Botafogo-PB		
1994	Corinthians Alagoano		
1994	Paraguaçuense		
1995	Bahia	8	(0)
1996	Fluminense		
1996–1998	Vitória	43	(3)
1999–2001	Porto	58	(6)
2001–2002	Real Zaragoza	22	(1)
2002–2003	Académica	4	(0)
2003	Goiás	18	(0)
2007	Botafogo-PB		
- * Club domestic league appearances and goals

José Marcelo Januário de Araújo (6 May 1972 – 31 October 2018), commonly known as Esquerdinha, was a Brazilian professional footballer who played as a left-back.

Esquerdinha scored in the first leg of the 1999 Supertaça Cândido de Oliveira which Porto would go on to win 5–2 on aggregate.

He died on 31 October 2018, in Cruz das Armas, a neighborhood in João Pessoa, Paraíba, Brazil from a heart attack after playing football with friends.
