= AC Cucujães =

Portuguese sports club

A.C. Cucujães
- Full name: Atlético Clube Cucujães
- Founded: 1922
- Ground: Estádio de Cucujães, Vila de Cucujães
- Capacity: 2500
- League: I Norte AF Aveiro
- 2020–21: 8th

Atlético Clube Cucujães is a Portuguese sports club from Vila de Cucujães, Oliveira de Azeméis.

The men's football team plays in the I Norte league of AF Aveiro. The team was promoted to the third tier in 1995, remaining in the Segunda Divisão B from 1995 to 2002, with an immediate relegation from the 2001–02 Terceira Divisão following thereafter.
