= 1999–2000 Taça de Portugal =

Tournament details
- Country: Portugal
- Dates: September 1999 – 25 May 2000

Final positions
- Champions: Porto (10th title)
- Runners-up: Sporting CP

Tournament statistics
- Top goal scorer(s): Mário Jardel (6 goals)

The 1999–2000 Taça de Portugal was the 60th edition of the Portuguese football knockout tournament, organized by the Portuguese Football Federation (FPF). The 1999–2000 Taça de Portugal began in September 1999. The final was played on 21 May and replayed four days later as the inaugural match ended tied at the Estádio Nacional.

Beira-Mar were the previous holders, having defeated Campomaiorense 1–0 in the previous season's final. The Auri-negros were eliminated in the fourth round by second division side Imortal. Porto defeated Sporting CP, 2–0 in the cup final replay to win their tenth Taça de Portugal. As a result of Porto winning the domestic cup competition, the Dragões faced 1999–2000 Primeira Liga winners Porto in the 2000 Supertaça Cândido de Oliveira.

== Fifth Round ==
Ties were played on the 9–12 January. Replays were played on the 19 January. Gil Vicente took a bye to the next round.

9 January 2000	Dragões Sandinenses (IV)	2–0	Vilanovense (III)	Estádio do Tourão, Vila Nova de Gaia
	P. Gomes 56'; Pinheiro 76'			Referee: José Mesquita

9 January 2000	Vizela (III)	2–2 (a.e.t.)	Fafe (III)	Estádio do Futebol Clube de Vizela, Vizela
	Mateus 32'; Damon 105'		Castro 89'; Lima 92'	Referee: João Vilas Boas

11 January 2000	Farense (I)	2–3	Estrela da Amadora (I)	Estádio de São Luís, Faro
	Nader 24'; Marinescu 87' (pen.)		R. Oliveira 11'; Neves 26'; Simões 61'	Referee: José Pratas

12 January 2000	Académica de Coimbra (II)	2–1	Vitória de Setúbal (I)	Estádio Municipal de Coimbra, Coimbra
	Tomás 25'; Dário 47'		Makinwa 14'	Referee: Paulo Costa

12 January 2000	Benfica (I)	7–0	Amora (III)	Estádio da Luz, Lisbon
	Maniche 27'; Uribe 29' (pen.), 86' (pen.); Tote 58', 60'; Porfírio 82'; N. Gomes 87'			Referee: Elmano Santos

12 January 2000	Boavista (I)	8–2	Paredes (IV)	Estádio do Bessa, Porto
	Sánchez 13', 67'; Emanuel 15'; Gilmar 32', 88'; M. Silva 37'; Rogério 44'; Timofte 76'		Pinto 74'; J. Martins 89'	Referee: Augusto Duarte

12 January 2000	Imortal (II)	0–0 (a.e.t.)	Felgueiras (II)	Estádio Municipal de Albufeira, Albufeira
				Referee: António Costa

12 January 2000	Infesta (III)	1–1 (a.e.t.)	Naval (II)	Campo Moreira Marques, São Mamede de Infesta
	Reis 54'		Fernando 90'	Referee: Cunha Antunes

12 January 2000	Moreirense (II)	3–2	Santa Clara (I)	Parque de Jogos Comendador Joaquim de Almeida Freitas, Moreira de Cónegos
	Pires 30', 67'; Artur 89'		Gamboa 29'; Abreu 82'	Referee: José Leirós

12 January 2000	Porto (I)	4–1	Braga (I)	Estádio das Antas, Porto
	Chaínho 29'; Jardel 39'; Clayton 82', 88'		Barroso 45'	Referee: Francisco Ferreira

12 January 2000	Salgueiros (I)	2–0	Campomaiorense (I)	Estádio Engenheiro Vidal Pinheiro, Porto
	Pedrosa 28'; Fehér 70'			Referee: Mário Santos

12 January 2000	Sporting CP (I)	1–0	União de Leiria (I)	Estádio José Alvalade, Lisbon
	Prates 45'			Referee: Paulo Baptista

12 January 2000	Sporting da Covilhã (II)	0–2	Rio Ave (I)	Estádio Municipal José Santos Pinto, Covilhã
			Vicente 69'; Henrique 89'	Referee: Antônio Pereira

12 January 2000	Vitória de Guimarães (I)	3–0	Casa Pia (IV)	Estádio D. Afonso Henriques, Guimarães
	Brandão 14', 58'; Nandinho 84'			Referee: Rui Mendes

19 January 2000 Replay	Fafe (III)	2–2 (a.e.t.) (5–4 p)	Vizela (III)	Parque Municipal dos Desportos de Fafe, Fafe
	Penalties
	Penalty scored		Penalty scored Penalty missed

19 January 2000 Replay	Felgueiras (II)	3–0	Imortal (II)	Estádio Doutor Machado de Matos, Felgueiras
	Eliseu 14'; Jorjão 25'; Paulo Gomes 44' (pen.)	(Report)		Referee: Isidoro Rodrigues

19 January 2000 Replay	Naval (II)	2–1	Infesta (III)	Estádio Municipal José Bento Pessoa, Figueira da Foz
	Rui Oliveira 43'; Jean Pierre 82'

== Sixth Round ==
Ties were played on the 25–26 January. Replays were played on the 2 February. Porto took a bye to the next round.

25 January 2000	Vitória de Guimarães (I)	3–0	Gil Vicente (I)	Estádio D. Afonso Henriques, Guimarães
15:00	Brandão 17', 67'; Edmilson 27'			Referee: José Leirós

26 January 2000	Académica de Coimbra (II)	0–1 (a.e.t.)	Moreirense (II)	Estádio Municipal de Coimbra, Coimbra
15:00			Rocha 95' (o.g.)	Referee: Paulo Paraty

26 January 2000	Benfica (I)	1–3	Sporting CP (I)	Estádio da Luz, Lisbon
15:00	Uribe 33'		Acosta 11', 74' (pen.); Cruz 36'	Referee: Vítor Pereira

26 January 2000	Boavista (I)	2–1	Felgueiras (II)	Estádio do Bessa, Porto
15:00	Rogério 21'; Sánchez 90'		Marafona 12'	Referee: Olegário Benquerença

26 January 2000	Estrela da Amadora (I)	1–2	Dragões Sandinenses (IV)	Estádio José Gomes, Amadora
15:00	Elísio 1' (o.g.)		Pinheiro 23', 90'	Referee: António Costa

26 January 2000	Rio Ave (I)	0–0 (a.e.t.)	Naval (II)	Estádio dos Arcos, Vila do Conde
15:00				Referee: Francisco Ferreira

26 January 2000	Salgueiros (I)	1–2 (a.e.t.)	Fafe (III)	Estádio Engenheiro Vidal Pinheiro, Porto
15:00	Fehér 84'		Armando Silva 50', 115'	Referee: Jacinto Paixão

2 February 2000 Replay	Naval (II)	2–3	Rio Ave (I)	Estádio Municipal José Bento Pessoa, Figueira da Foz
	Rui Oliveira 2', 74'		Henrique 13'; Vicente 36'; Jacaré 58'	Referee: Paulo Baptista

== Quarter-finals ==
Ties were played on the 9 February.

9 February 2000	Porto (I)	3–0	Fafe (III)	Estádio das Antas, Porto
	Jardel 21', 44' (pen.), 78' (pen.)			Referee: Duarte Gomes

9 February 2000	Rio Ave (I)	1–0	Boavista (I)	Estádio do Rio Ave FC, Vila do Conde
	Niquinha 46'			Referee: José Leirós

9 February 2000	Sporting CP (I)	3–0	Dragões Sandinenses (IV)	Estádio José Alvalade, Lisbon
	Toñito 77'; Marcos 83'; A. Martins 89'			Referee: Olegário Benquerença

9 February 2000	Vitória de Guimarães (I)	0–1	Moreirense (II)	Estádio D. Afonso Henriques, Guimarães
			Pires 28' (pen.)	Referee: Martins dos Santos

== Semi-finals ==
Ties were played on the 12 April.

12 April 2000	Porto (I)	3–0	Rio Ave (I)	Estádio das Antas, Porto
	Domingos 19'; Jardel 28'; R. Silva 30'			Referee: Jorge Coroado

12 April 2000	Moreirense (II)	0–1	Sporting CP (I)	Parque de Jogos Comendador Joaquim de Almeida Freitas, Moreira de Cónegos
			Ayew 54'

== Final ==
21 May 2000
17:00 WEST

Porto	1–1 (a.e.t.)	Sporting CP
Jardel 4'		Barbosa 56'

Estádio Nacional, Oeiras
Referee: António Costa (Porto)

=== Replay ===
25 May 2000
20:30 WEST

Porto	2–0	Sporting CP
Clayton 47'; Deco 74'

Estádio Nacional, Oeiras
Referee: Lucílio Batista (Lisbon)
