= List of Portugal international footballers =

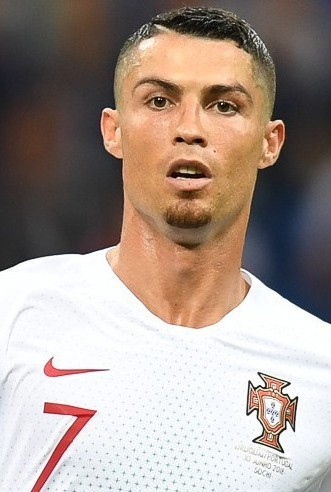
Cristiano Ronaldo is Portugal's most capped player.

This is a list of players who earned 25 or more caps for the Portugal national football team. For all players who have played for Portugal, see Category:Portugal men's international footballers.

As of June 2026, 128 players have reached this milestone for Portugal. The record for the most caps is held by Cristiano Ronaldo, with 234 caps since 2003; he overtook Luís Figo's record of 127 caps in June 2016. The only other players with a century of caps are Fernando Couto, Nani, João Moutinho, Pepe, Rui Patrício and Bernardo Silva; Patrício is also the most capped Portuguese goalkeeper, with 108 international matches played between 2010 and 2024.

The first player to reach 25 caps was Xico, in his final appearance on 17 June 1951. The most recent player to gain their 25th cap was João Neves, on 27 June 2026.

== Players ==
Appearances and goals are composed of FIFA World Cup and UEFA European Championship matches and each competition's required qualification matches, as well as UEFA Nations League matches, FIFA Confederations Cup matches, and numerous international friendly tournaments and matches. Players are listed by number of caps, then number of goals scored. If number of goals are equal, the players are then listed alphabetically. Statistics correct as of 1 October 2026.

Key
§	Named to the national team in the past year
GK	Goalkeeper
DF	Defender
MF	Midfielder
FW	Forward
Bold	Still playing competitive football

Portugal national football team players with at least 25 appearances
Rank	Player	Position	Caps	Goals	Date of debut	Debut against	Date of final match	Final match against	Ref.
1	**Cristiano Ronaldo** ^{§}	FW	234	146	20 August 2003	Kazakhstan	24 September 2026	Wales	
2	**João Moutinho**	MF	146	7	17 August 2005	Egypt	9 June 2022	Czech Republic	
3	Pepe	DF	141	8	21 November 2007	Finland	5 July 2024	France	
4	Luís Figo	MF	127	32	12 October 1991	Luxembourg	8 July 2006	Germany	
5	**Bernardo Silva** ^{§}	MF	114	14	31 March 2015	Cape Verde	—	—	
6	Nani	MF	112	24	1 September 2006	Denmark	2 July 2017	Mexico	
7	Fernando Couto	DF	110	8	19 December 1990	United States	30 June 2004	Netherlands	
8	Rui Patrício	GK	108	0	17 November 2010	Spain	21 March 2024	Sweden	
9	Bruno Alves	DF	96	11	5 June 2007	Kuwait	7 June 2018	Algeria	
9	**Bruno Fernandes** ^{§}	MF	96	9	10 November 2017	Saudi Arabia	—	—	
11	Rui Costa	MF	94	26	31 March 1993	Switzerland	4 July 2004	Greece	
12	Ricardo Carvalho	DF	89	5	11 October 2003	Albania	22 June 2016	Hungary	
13	Pauleta	FW	88	47	20 August 1997	Armenia	8 July 2006	Germany	
14	Simão	MF	85	22	18 November 1998	Israel	29 June 2010	Spain	
15	**Rúben Dias** ^{§}	DF	83	3	28 May 2018	Tunisia	—	—	
16	João Pinto	FW	81	23	12 October 1991	Luxembourg	14 June 2002	South Korea	
17	Ricardo Quaresma	MF	80	10	10 June 2003	Bolivia	30 June 2018	Uruguay	
17	**William Carvalho**	MF	80	5	19 November 2013	Sweden	6 December 2022	Switzerland	
17	Vítor Baía	GK	80	0	19 December 1990	United States	7 September 2002	England	
20	Nuno Gomes	FW	79	29	24 January 1996	France	11 October 2011	Denmark	
20	Ricardo	GK	79	0	2 June 2001	Republic of Ireland	19 June 2008	Germany	
22	**João Cancelo** ^{§}	DF	76	13	1 September 2016	Gibraltar	—	—	
22	Raul Meireles	MF	76	10	15 November 2006	Kazakhstan	22 June 2014	United States	
24	Deco	MF	75	5	29 March 2003	Brazil	15 June 2010	Ivory Coast	
25	**Danilo Pereira**	MF	74	2	31 March 2015	Cape Verde	26 June 2024	Georgia	
26	**Rúben Neves** ^{§}	MF	72	1	14 November 2015	Russia	—	—	
27	Hélder Postiga	FW	71	27	12 February 2003	Italy	14 November 2014	Armenia	
28	João Pinto	DF	70	1	16 February 1983	France	9 November 1996	Ukraine	
29	Nené	FW	66	22	21 April 1971	Scotland	23 June 1984	France	
29	Tiago	MF	66	3	20 November 2002	Scotland	8 October 2015	Denmark	
31	**Raphaël Guerreiro**	DF	65	4	14 November 2014	Armenia	19 November 2023	Iceland	
32	Eusébio	FW	64	41	8 October 1961	Luxembourg	13 October 1973	Bulgaria	
32	Humberto Coelho	DF	64	6	27 October 1968	Romania	27 April 1983	Soviet Union	
34	Manuel Bento	GK	63	0	16 October 1976	Poland	3 June 1986	England	
35	Paulo Ferreira	DF	62	0	7 September 2002	England	15 June 2010	Ivory Coast	
36	**João Félix** ^{§}	FW	60	15	5 June 2019	Switzerland	—	—	
37	Miguel	DF	59	1	12 February 2003	Italy	3 September 2010	Cyprus	
38	Hugo Almeida	FW	57	19	18 February 2004	England	31 March 2015	Cape Verde	
38	Mário Coluna	MF	57	8	4 May 1955	Scotland	11 December 1968	Greece	
38	Petit	MF	57	4	2 June 2001	Republic of Ireland	19 June 2008	Germany	
39	Sérgio Conceição	MF	56	12	9 November 1996	Ukraine	6 June 2003	Spain	
39	**João Mário**	MF	56	3	11 October 2014	France	23 March 2023	Liechtenstein	
39	Miguel Veloso	MF	56	3	13 October 2007	Azerbaijan	11 October 2015	Serbia	
44	Oceano	MF	54	8	30 January 1985	Romania	22 April 1998	England	
44	Fernando Meira	DF	54	2	11 October 2000	Netherlands	11 October 2008	Sweden	
44	**Nélson Semedo** ^{§}	DF	54	0	11 October 2015	Serbia	—	—	
47	**André Silva**	FW	53	19	1 September 2016	Gibraltar	2 December 2022	South Korea	
47	Costinha	MF	53	2	14 October 1998	Slovakia	11 October 2006	Poland	
49	Maniche	MF	52	7	29 March 2003	Brazil	31 March 2009	South Africa	
49	Fábio Coentrão	DF	52	5	14 November 2009	Bosnia and Herzegovina	3 September 2017	Hungary	
49	**Nuno Mendes** ^{§}	DF	52	2	24 March 2021	Azerbaijan	—	—	
52	**Rafael Leão** ^{§}	FW	51	6	9 October 2021	Qatar	—	—	
52	Jorge Andrade	DF	51	3	25 April 2001	France	22 August 2007	Armenia	
52	Paulo Sousa	MF	51	0	16 January 1991	Spain	25 May 2002	China	
52	**Diogo Costa** ^{§}	GK	51	0	9 October 2021	Qatar	—	—	
56	Jorge Costa	DF	50	2	11 November 1992	Bulgaria	14 June 2002	South Korea	
56	José Fonte	DF	50	1	18 November 2014	Argentina	24 March 2022	Turkey	
58	Diogo Jota	FW	49	14	14 November 2019	Lithuania	8 June 2025	Spain	
59	Fernando Gomes	FW	48	13	9 March 1975	(Brazil) Goiás	16 November 1988	Luxembourg	
60	António Simões	MF	46	3	6 May 1962	Brazil	13 October 1973	Bulgaria	
60	**Vitinha** ^{§}	MF	46	1	29 March 2022	North Macedonia	—	—	
62	José Augusto	MF	45	9	7 May 1958	England	11 December 1968	Greece	
62	Ricardo Sá Pinto	FW	45	9	7 September 1994	Northern Ireland	6 June 2001	Cyprus	
62	Rui Jorge	DF	45	1	20 April 1994	Norway	8 September 2004	Estonia	
65	Vítor Paneira	MF	44	4	12 October 1988	Sweden	29 May 1996	Republic of Ireland	
65	Dimas	DF	44	0	15 August 1995	Liechtenstein	13 February 2002	Spain	
67	Rui Jordão	FW	43	15	29 March 1972	Cyprus	25 January 1989	Greece	
68	Carlos Manuel	MF	42	8	26 March 1980	Scotland	11 June 1986	Morocco	
69	Paulo Futre	MF	41	6	21 September 1983	Finland	3 June 1995	Latvia	
70	Hilário	DF	40	0	11 November 1959	France	17 February 1971	Belgium	
70	João Pereira	DF	40	0	8 October 2010	Denmark	7 September 2014	Albania	
70	António Veloso	DF	40	0	18 November 1981	Scotland	19 January 1984	Scotland	
73	**Diogo Dalot** ^{§}	DF	39	3	23 June 2021	France	—	—	
73	**João Palhinha** ^{§}	MF	39	2	24 March 2021	Azerbaijan	—	—	
73	Virgílio	DF	39	0	27 February 1949	Italy	22 May 1960	Yugoslavia	
76	Danny	MF	38	4	20 August 2008	Faroe Islands	29 March 2016	Belgium	
76	Eurico	DF	38	3	20 September 1978	Italy	3 April 1985	Italy	
78	Rui Barros	MF	36	4	29 March 1987	Malta	14 December 1996	Germany	
78	Jaime Graça	MF	36	4	24 January 1965	Turkey	9 July 1972	Brazil	
78	João Alves	MF	36	3	13 November 1974	Switzerland	27 April 1983	Soviet Union	
78	Eduardo	GK	36	0	11 February 2009	Finland	1 September 2016	Gibraltar	
78	José Carlos	DF	36	0	12 March 1961	Luxembourg	12 May 1971	Denmark	
83	José Travassos	FW	35	6	5 January 1947	Switzerland	7 May 1958	England	
83	Eder	FW	35	5	11 September 2012	Azerbaijan	20 November 2018	Poland	
83	Hélder Cristóvão	DF	35	3	12 February 1992	Netherlands	25 April 2001	France	
83	Artur Correia	DF	35	1	10 May 1972	Cyprus	21 November 1979	Austria	
83	Carlos Secretário	DF	35	1	18 December 1994	Liechtenstein	28 March 2001	Netherlands	
83	Paulo Bento	DF	35	0	15 January 1992	Spain	14 June 2002	South Korea	
89	Domingos	FW	34	9	29 March 1989	Angola	19 August 1998	Mozambique	
89	**Gonçalo Guedes** ^{§}	FW	34	8	14 November 2015	Russia	—	—	
89	Capucho	MF	34	2	21 February 1996	Germany	16 October 2002	Sweden	
89	**Cédric Soares**	DF	34	1	11 October 2014	France	27 March 2021	Serbia	
93	José Torres	FW	33	14	23 January 1963	Bulgaria	13 October 1973	Bulgaria	
93	Jorge Cadete	FW	33	5	29 August 1990	West Germany	22 April 1998	England	
93	**Pedro Neto** ^{§}	FW	33	3	11 November 2020	Andorra	—	—	
93	Toni	MF	33	1	12 October 1969	Romania	8 March 1978	France	
93	Nuno Valente	DF	33	1	7 September 2002	England	11 October 2006	Poland	
98	**Renato Sanches**	MF	32	3	25 March 2016	Bulgaria	14 November 2021	Serbia	
98	Quim	GK	32	0	18 August 1999	Andorra	19 November 2008	Brazil	
100	Rui Águas	FW	31	10	3 April 1985	Italy	17 November 1993	Italy	
100	Manuel Fernandes	FW	31	7	9 March 1975	(Brazil) Goiás	29 March 1987	Malta	
100	Beto	DF	31	2	6 September 1997	Germany	5 June 2004	Lithuania	
103	**Gonçalo Ramos** ^{§}	FW	30	13	17 November 2022	Nigeria	—	—	
103	**João Neves** ^{§}	MF	30	4	16 October 2023	Bosnia and Herzegovina	—	—	
103	Paulinho Santos	MF	30	2	19 January 1994	Spain	10 February 1999	Netherlands	
106	Eliseu	MF	29	1	10 June 2009	Estonia	10 October 2017	Switzerland	
106	Hugo Viana	MF	29	1	14 November 2001	Angola	14 November 2012	Gabon	
106	Damas	GK	29	0	6 April 1969	Mexico	11 June 1986	Morocco	
106	**André Gomes**	MF	29	0	7 September 2014	Albania	26 March 2018	Netherlands	
110	Hernâni	MF	28	5	21 November 1953	South Africa	7 June 1964	Brazil	
110	Luís Boa Morte	MF	28	1	25 April 2001	France	10 June 2009	Estonia	
112	Matateu	MF	27	13	23 November 1952	Austria	22 May 1960	Yugoslavia	
112	Silvestre Varela	MF	27	5	3 March 2010	China	16 June 2015	Italy	
112	Fernando Peres	MF	27	4	4 June 1964	England	9 July 1972	Brazil	
112	Fernando Chalana	MF	27	2	17 November 1976	Denmark	12 October 1988	Sweden	
112	Minervino Pietra	DF	27	1	14 November 1973	Northern Ireland	21 September 1983	Finland	
112	António Sousa	MF	27	1	15 April 1981	Bulgaria	15 November 1989	Czechoslovakia	
112	José Bosingwa	DF	27	0	2 June 2007	Belgium	29 March 2015	Serbia	
119	Manuel Vasques	FW	26	8	21 March 1948	Spain	16 June 1957	Brazil	
119	António Folha	MF	26	5	5 September 1993	Estonia	9 November 1996	Ukraine	
119	Adrien Silva	MF	26	1	18 November 2014	Argentina	30 June 2018	Uruguay	
122	José Águas	FW	25	11	23 November 1952	Austria	17 May 1962	Belgium	
122	Vieirinha	DF	25	1	22 March 2013	Israel	22 June 2016	Hungary	
122	Marco Caneira	DF	25	0	27 March 2002	Finland	26 March 2008	Greece	
122	Francisco Ferreira	MF	25	0	28 January 1940	France	17 June 1951	Belgium	
122	Augusto Inácio	DF	25	0	5 December 1976	Cyprus	11 June 1986	Morocco	
122	Jaime Pacheco	MF	25	0	23 February 1983	West Germany	12 September 1990	Finland	
122	**Rafa Silva**	FW	25	0	5 March 2014	Cameroon	4 September 2021	Qatar	
