= UEFA Euro 2016 final =

European football match

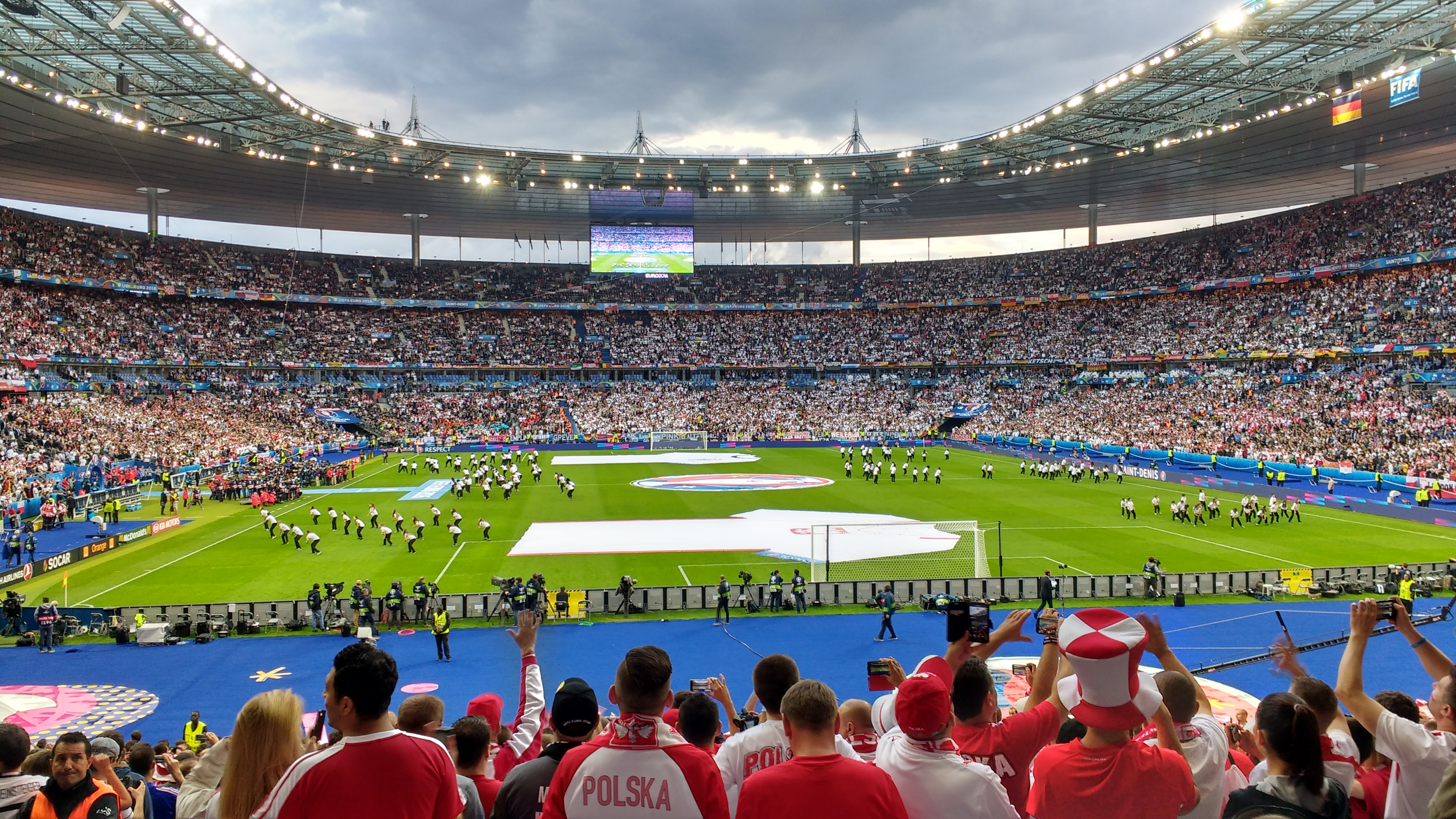
- The Stade de France in Saint-Denis hosted the final
- Event: UEFA Euro 2016
Portugal	France
1	0
- After extra time
- Date: 10 July 2016
- Venue: Stade de France, Saint-Denis
- Man of the Match: Pepe (Portugal)
- Referee: Mark Clattenburg (England)
- Attendance: 75,868
- Weather: Sunny; 28 °C (82 °F); 38% humidity

The UEFA Euro 2016 final was the final match of UEFA Euro 2016, the fifteenth edition of the European Championship, UEFA's quadrennial competition for national association football teams. The match was played at the Stade de France in Paris, France, on 10 July 2016, and was contested between Portugal and hosts France.

The 24-team tournament began with a group stage, from which 16 teams qualified for the knockout stage. En route to the final, Portugal finished third in Group F, with draws against Iceland, Austria and Hungary. Portugal then defeated Croatia in the last 16, Poland in the quarter-finals after a penalty shoot-out, and progressed to the final after beating Wales 2–0 in the semi-finals. Meanwhile, France finished as winners of Group A, beating Romania and Albania before drawing with Switzerland. In the knockout stage, France defeated the Republic of Ireland in the last 16, Iceland in the quarter-finals, and progressed to the final after beating Germany 2–0 in the semi-finals.

The final took place in front of 75,868 spectators, and was refereed by English official Mark Clattenburg. Following a goalless 90 minutes which saw Portugal captain Cristiano Ronaldo depart the match through injury, Portugal then took the lead in the 108th minute through substitute Eder, after his low shot from 25 yards (23 m) beat France goalkeeper Hugo Lloris. This would prove to be the contest's only goal, as Portugal won 1–0 to claim their first major tournament title.

In winning the final, Portugal became the tenth different nation to win the European Championship, twelve years after losing their first final, at home in the 2004 tournament. France became the second host team to lose the final, after Portugal, and suffered their first defeat at a major tournament hosted in the country since the 1960 European Nations' Cup third-place play-off against Czechoslovakia. This was the fifth European Championship final to end in a draw after 90 minutes of play, and the second whose winners were decided by extra time, after the inaugural final in 1960. As the winners, Portugal gained entry into their first FIFA Confederations Cup, which was played in Russia in 2017.

== Background ==
UEFA Euro 2016 was the fifteenth edition of the European Football Championship, UEFA's football competition for national teams, held between 10 June and 10 July 2016 in France. Qualifying rounds were held between September 2014 and November 2015, in which 53 teams were divided into nine groups of five or six, playing each other on a home-and-away round-robin tournament basis. The top two teams in each group, along with France, the host team, qualified for the finals, as did Turkey who had the best third-place record. The remaining four places were determined via two-legged play-offs involving the other eight third-placed teams. In the final tournament, the 24 teams were divided into six groups of four with each team playing each other once within the group. The two top teams from each group along with the four best third-placed sides advanced to a knock-out phase.

France had previously played in two European Championship finals, winning as tournament hosts against Spain in 1984, and now via a golden goal against Italy in the Netherlands in 2000. Portugal had played in one prior final, losing to Greece in their own country in 2004. The two teams had previously met 24 times, their first encounter taking place in 1926 when France won 4–2 in Toulouse. Before the final, France had won eighteen of those meetings, Portugal five, with one draw. Portugal's last victory was in a 1975 friendly in France, after which France won all ten of the subsequent meetings. All three of their previous competitive meetings – in the semi-finals of Euro 1984, Euro 2000, and the 2006 FIFA World Cup – had been French victories. At the start of the tournament, Portugal were listed in eighth place in the FIFA World Rankings, while France were seventeenth.

The final was held at the Stade de France in Saint-Denis, a suburb of Paris. The announcement of the venue was made by UEFA, along with the full tournament schedule, on 25 April 2014, following a meeting held in Paris. The French capital had hosted the finals of two previous European Championships, in 1960 and 1984, both at the Parc des Princes. A UEFA Category Four stadium, the Stade de France is the sixth-largest stadium in Europe and was the largest venue of Euro 2016, with a maximum capacity for the tournament of 80,000. The final was the seventh match played in the stadium at Euro 2016, which included the tournament's opening game between France and Romania.

== Route to the final ==
=== Portugal ===
Portugal's route to the final
	Opponent	Result
1	Iceland	1–1
2	Austria	0–0
3	Hungary	3–3
R16	Croatia	1–0 (a.e.t.)
QF	Poland	1–1 (a.e.t.) (5–3 p)
SF	Wales	2–0

After qualifying for Euro 2016 as winners of Group I with seven wins and a defeat in their eight matches, Portugal were drawn in Group F for the finals tournament. Their first group game was against Iceland at the Stade Geoffroy-Guichard in Saint-Étienne on 14 June. Gylfi Sigurðsson had two early chances to put Iceland ahead but both shots were saved by Portugal goalkeeper Rui Patrício, before Nani gave Portugal the lead in the 31st minute after a cross from André Gomes. Five minutes into the second half, Iceland equalised when Birkir Bjarnason scored from a Jóhann Berg Guðmundsson cross that had been missed by Portugal's Vieirinha. Despite having the majority of the possession and more shots throughout the match, Portugal were unable to retake the lead and the game ended 1–1. Portugal's second opponents were Austria at the Parc des Princes four days later. The first half ended goalless, but late in the second half, Portugal were awarded a penalty kick. Cristiano Ronaldo, who became his country's most-capped player in that game, was fouled in Austria's penalty area by defender Martin Hinteregger but missed the penalty, striking the foot of the goalpost. He also had a header disallowed for offside and the match ended 0–0.

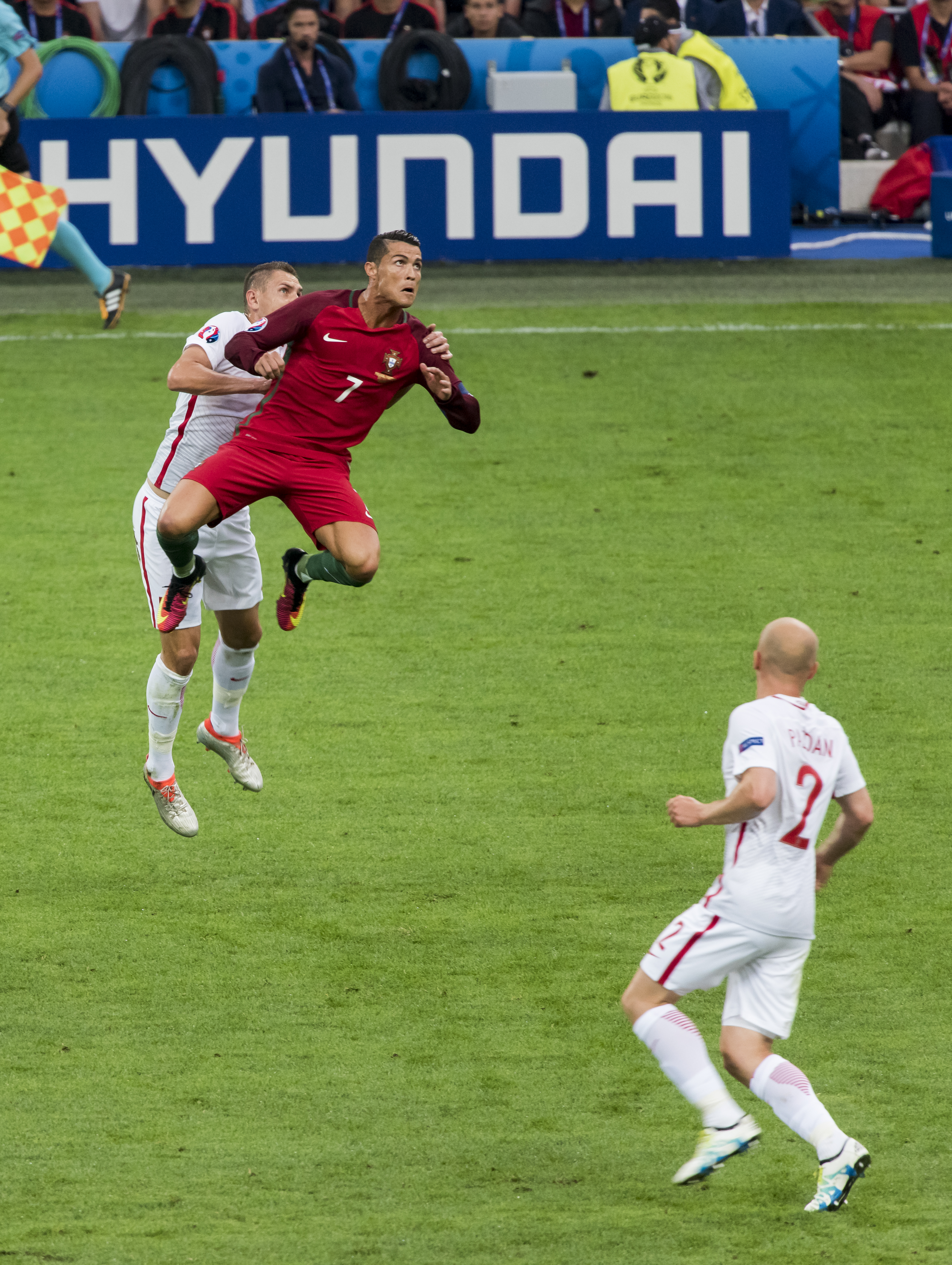
Cristiano Ronaldo (pictured playing against Poland in the quarter-finals) became his country's most capped player during the tournament.

In their final group match, Portugal faced Hungary at the Parc Olympique Lyonnais in Décines-Charpieu on 22 June. Zoltán Gera gave Hungary the lead in the 19th minute with a volley, before Nani struck a low shot past Gábor Király in the Hungary goal following a pass from Ronaldo to level the scores. Balázs Dzsudzsák restored Hungary's lead two minutes after half-time with a deflected shot, only for Ronaldo to make it 2–2 three minutes later. Dzsudzsák scored his second deflected strike in the 55th minute, but Ronaldo equalised once again, this time with a header in the 60th minute. The match ended 3–3, and with a late winning goal from Iceland against Austria, Portugal ended the group stage in third place. Only four of the six third-placed teams qualified; Portugal were ranked third of the six and progressed along with Slovakia, the Republic of Ireland and Northern Ireland.

In the round of 16, Portugal faced Group D winners Croatia at the Stade Bollaert-Delelis in Lens on 25 June. The match was described by BBC Sport's Saj Chowdhury as "a turgid affair", and noted as a game that "won't live long in anyone's memory" by Barry Glendenning in The Guardian. Regular time ended goalless without a single shot in the first 24 minutes, a European Championship record. With three minutes of extra time remaining, Ronaldo's shot was kept out by Danijel Subašić, the Croatia goalkeeper, but Ricardo Quaresma headed in the rebound from close range to give Portugal a 1–0 victory.

Portugal's quarter-final opponents, at the Stade Vélodrome in Marseille on 30 June, were Poland, who took an early lead when Kamil Grosicki's cross was struck into the Portugal goal by Robert Lewandowski within the opening two minutes, the second-fastest goal scored in the history of the tournament at the time. With 17 minutes of the first half remaining, Renato Sanches played a one-two with Nani and struck a shot that deflected off Grzegorz Krychowiak into the Poland goal to level the scores at 1–1. The second half of the match was goalless, as were the two halves of extra time, so the game went to a penalty shoot-out. Ronaldo, Sanches and João Moutinho scored their penalties for Portugal, while Lewandowski, Arkadiusz Milik and Kamil Glik replied for Poland to make it 3–3. Nani then put Portugal ahead before Jakub Błaszczykowski's strike was saved by Rui Patrício. Quaresma scored Portugal's fifth penalty to seal the win and progression to the semi-finals.

Portugal returned to the Parc Olympique Lyonnais on 6 July to face Wales, who were participating in their first major tournament since the 1958 FIFA World Cup. After a goalless first half, Portugal took the lead five minutes after the interval, when Ronaldo headed past Wayne Hennessey, the Wales goalkeeper, following a short corner. Three minutes later, Nani diverted a long-range shot from Ronaldo past Hennessey to give Portugal a 2–0 victory and progression to the UEFA European Championship final.

=== France ===
France's route to the final
	Opponent	Result
1	Romania	2–1
2	Albania	2–0
3	Switzerland	0–0
R16	Republic of Ireland	2–1
QF	Iceland	5–2
SF	Germany	2–0

Having qualified for Euro 2016 automatically as hosts, France were placed in Group A for the finals. In their first group match, they faced Romania at the Stade de France on 10 June. Antoine Griezmann came closest to scoring in a goalless first half when he struck the Romania goalpost with a header. Thirteen minutes into the second half, France took the lead when Olivier Giroud headed in Dimitri Payet's cross. Seven minutes later, Patrice Evra fouled Romania's Nicolae Stanciu in the France penalty area and Bogdan Stancu levelled the scores from the resulting penalty kick. With a minute of the match remaining, Payet scored from 20 yards (18 m) to give France a 2–1 victory.

France's next opponents were Albania, against whom they played five days later at the Stade Vélodrome. Albania defended well and came close to taking the lead when Ledian Memushaj's shot hit the post. France scored in the last minute of normal time with the game's first shot on target when Griezmann headed in Adil Rami's cross. Six minutes into stoppage time and with the final kick of the match, Payet scored and France won 2–0. In their final group match, France played Switzerland at the Stade Pierre-Mauroy in Villeneuve-d'Ascq on 19 June. Paul Pogba hit the frame of Switzerland's goal twice, while Payet also hit the crossbar. Bacary Sagna pulled the shirt of Switzerland's Blerim Džemaili in stoppage time in France's penalty area but no penalty was awarded, and the match ended 0–0. France ended as Group A winners and progressed to the round of 16.

France faced the third-placed team from Group E, the Republic of Ireland, at the Parc Olympique Lyonnais on 26 June. In the second minute, Pogba fouled Shane Long in the France penalty area and Robbie Brady scored the resulting penalty to give Ireland a 1–0 lead. Griezmann scored the equaliser with a header for France twelve minutes after half-time, before scoring his second four minutes later to make it 2–1. Shane Duffy was shown a red card in the 66th minute for a professional foul on Griezmann and although France won the match 2–1, both Rami and N'Golo Kanté were unavailable in the next round, having picked up two bookings in the tournament.

France's quarter-final opponents were Iceland, who had knocked out England in the previous round. Giroud put France into the lead after 12 minutes with a low shot before Pogba doubled his side's advantage with a header eight minutes later. Payet scored in the 43rd minute with a low shot from around 30 yards (27 m), before Griezmann increased the lead further with a lob over Hannes Þór Halldórsson, the Iceland goalkeeper, to make it 4–0 just before half-time. Kolbeinn Sigþórsson scored for Iceland eleven minutes after the interval, before Giroud restored France's four-goal lead with a header from a Payet free kick. Bjarnason scored a headed goal with six minutes of the match remaining, but that proved to be the final goal as the game ended 5–2.

In the semi-finals, France faced Germany, the 2014 FIFA World Cup winners, at the Stade Vélodrome on 7 July in a rematch of the 2014 World Cup quarter-final (won 1–0 by Germany). Two minutes into first-half stoppage time, Bastian Schweinsteiger was adjudged to have handled the ball when he challenged Evra in the penalty area, and Griezmann scored the resulting penalty to give France a 1–0 lead at half-time. With 18 minutes of the match remaining, Griezmann scored from close range after Manuel Neuer had failed to clear a cross from Pogba. Joshua Kimmich almost pulled a goal back for Germany, but his shot hit the frame of the France goal and his header on the rebound was saved by Hugo Lloris. The match ended 2–0 to give France their first victory over Germany in a major tournament since the 1958 FIFA World Cup.

== Pre-match ==
The official match ball for the knockout phase and final was the Adidas Fracas, provided by German sports equipment company Adidas. Announced during the tournament, the ball was officially launched on 20 June. This was the first time a match ball was not used exclusively for the final, and the first time multiple ball designs were used throughout the tournament (excluding the final).

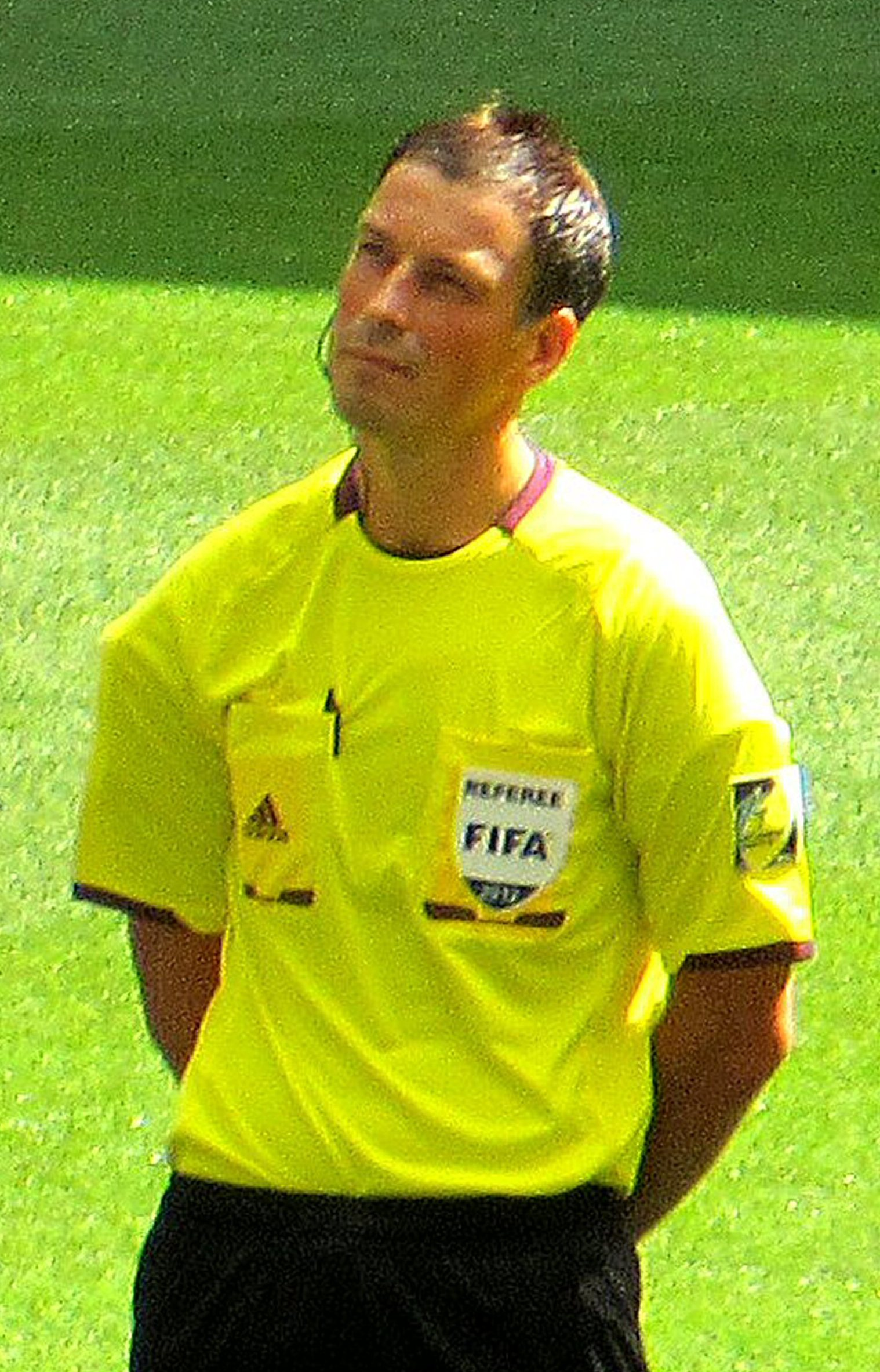
Mark Clattenburg was the final's referee.

On 8 July 2016, the UEFA Referees Committee announced the officiating team, led by English referee Mark Clattenburg of The Football Association. His compatriots Simon Beck and Jake Collin were chosen as assistant referees, and fellow Englishmen Anthony Taylor and Andre Marriner the additional assistants. Hungarian Viktor Kassai was chosen as the fourth official, and his fellow countryman György Ring as the reserve assistant. Clattenburg became the second official to referee both a UEFA Champions League final and European Championship final in the same season, after Pedro Proença in 2012. This made it a hat-trick of cup finals for Clattenburg, after the 2016 FA Cup Final and the 2016 UEFA Champions League Final, all within a seven-week span. Clattenburg, FIFA-listed since 2007 and a UEFA Elite referee, also officiated the 2012 Olympics gold medal match and the 2014 UEFA Super Cup. He became the first English European Championship final referee since Arthur Holland in 1964. The match was Clattenburg's fourth appointment at Euro 2016.

In the hours leading up to the final, there were clashes between fans trying to access the Eiffel Tower fan zone and police attempting to prevent overcrowding. Police carried out a controlled explosion on a package left near the stadium complex, while fans set litter bins alight. The disruption was under control by the second half, but after the match, fights broke out between fans outside the stadium. Police advised people not to travel to the Eiffel Tower or the Champs-Élysées as the area was not safe.

Before the start of the match, the closing ceremony was held at 8:45 p.m. It featured 600 dancers and a live rendition of "Seven Nation Army" by various musicians including members of the Paris Fire Brigade, the French Republican Guard, and the Choir of Radio France, before French DJ David Guetta and Swedish singer Zara Larsson performed the official tournament song "This One's for You". Before the match started, the stadium was invaded by silver Y moths, which caused some irritation to the players, staff and coaches. Workers at the stadium had left the lights switched on the day before the match, which attracted huge swaths of insects. The players and coaches of each team during the warm-up tried swatting the moths, and ground staff used brushes to clean moths from the walls, ground and other areas.

France's starting line-up was unchanged from the semi-final, while Portugal brought back Pepe and William Carvalho, who missed the semi-final through injury and suspension respectively, for Bruno Alves and Danilo. France adopted a 4–2–3–1 formation while Portugal played as a 4–1–3–2. Before the match, Portugal's manager, Fernando Santos, reacted to the criticism his side had received during the tournament, stating "I want it to continue ... I want us to win [the final] without deserving it!"

== Match ==
=== Summary ===
==== First half ====
Portugal kicked off the final at around 9:00 p.m. CEST on 10 July 2016 in front of an attendance of 75,868, in sunny conditions with a temperature of 28 °C (82 °F) and 38% humidity. After early mistakes from both José Fonte and Carvalho, in the fourth minute, Cédric Soares sent a long pass to Nani whose shot went over the France crossbar from 15 yards (14 m). Two minutes later, a header out from Fonte fell to France's Moussa Sissoko whose volley was off-target before Griezmann struck a half-volley wide of the Portugal goal. In the eighth minute, Payet put in a strong tackle on Ronaldo who subsequently appeared to be in pain. In the 10th minute, a mistake from Pepe allowed Payet to cross for Griezmann whose header was saved by Rui Patrício. Giroud's attempt to score from the subsequent corner was also saved by the Portugal goalkeeper. In the 18th minute, Ronaldo left the pitch for medical attention and returned after a period of Portugal possession with a strapped knee before Sissoko struck a shot that was deflected just over the crossbar. Midway through the half João Mário volleyed wide of the France goal before Ronaldo, taken off the pitch on a stretcher, was substituted for Quaresma, and Portugal changed to a 4–1–4–1 formation with Nani playing alone upfront. In the 34th minute, Sissoko nutmegged Adrien Silva before striking a shot which was kept out by Rui Patrício. Cédric was then shown a yellow card for a foul on Payet. Three minutes later, Nani passed to Adrien Silva who was tackled in the France penalty area. From the resulting corner, Fonte headed over the crossbar. With four minutes of the half remaining, Payet's shot was blocked by Pepe. Two minutes into stoppage time, João Mário's cross towards Nani passed wide of the far post and the half ended goalless.

==== Second half ====
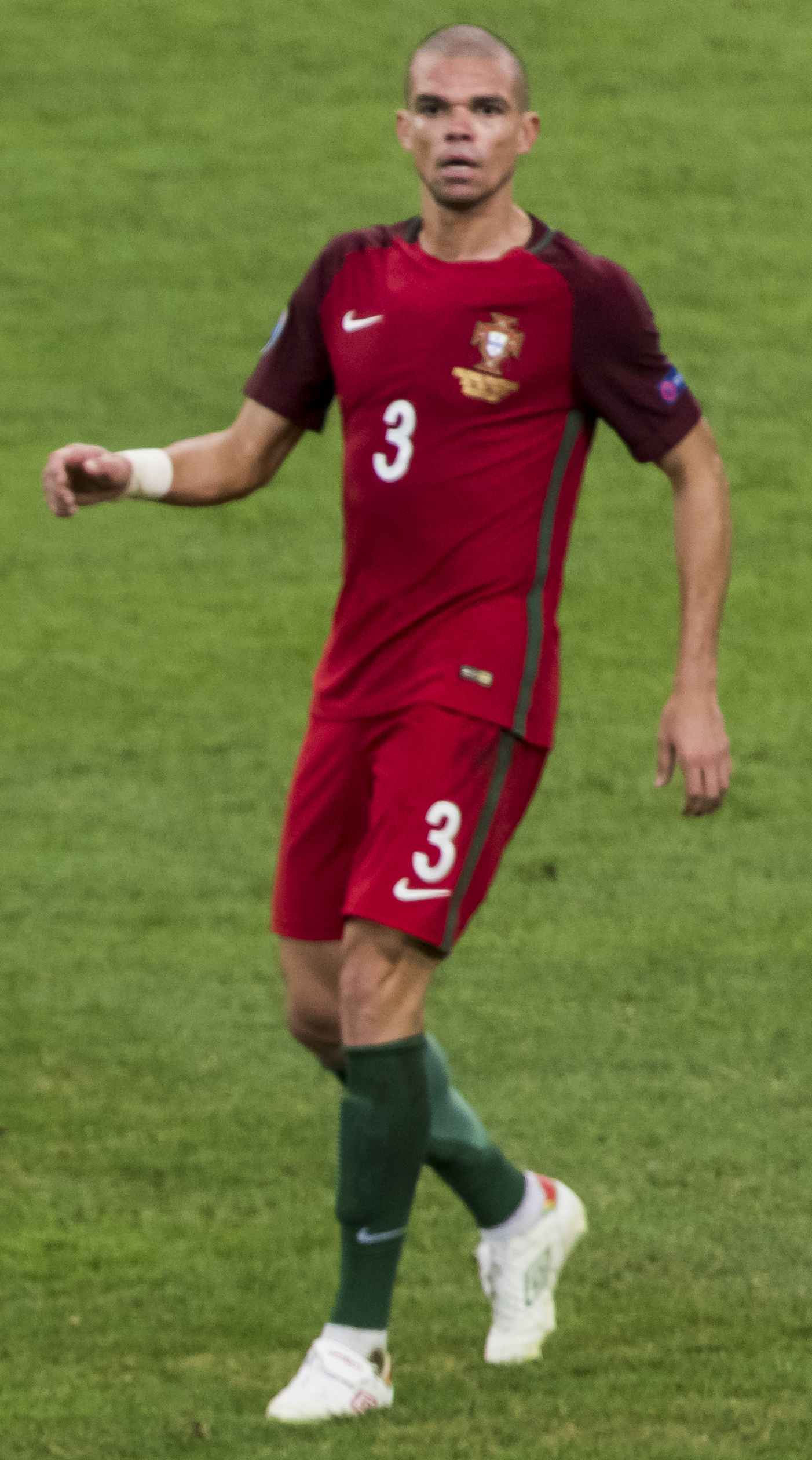
Pepe (pictured in the quarter-final against Poland) was named man of the match.

Neither side made any changes to their playing personnel during the interval and France kicked off the second half. Four minutes in, Sissoko fouled Pepe, who then dispossessed Payet before he could shoot. In the 53rd minute, France won a corner after a clearance from Pepe which Rui Patrício caught on the second attempt. Pogba then struck a shot high over the Portugal crossbar from around 30 yards (27 m). There was a brief delay to the match while a pitch invader was removed by security. In the 56th minute, João Mário's cross was headed behind by Samuel Umtiti and Quaresma's subsequent corner was headed clear by Evra. Three minutes later, France made their first substitution of the game with Kingsley Coman coming on to replace Payet. Coman's first significant contribution was to pass to Griezmann whose shot was caught by Rui Patrício. In the 62nd minute, João Mário was shown the yellow card for tripping Giroud and four minutes later Pogba's pass found Coman who sent in a cross which Griezmann headed wide from 6 yards (5.5 m).

Portugal then made their second substitution, with João Moutinho replacing Adrien Silva. With 17 minutes remaining, Coman played a one-two with Giroud but Coman's cross into the Portugal penalty area failed to find any of his teammates. Two minutes later, Coman passed the ball to Giroud in the Portugal box who struck it low, but his shot was saved by Rui Patrício. In the 78th minute, both sides made their third substitutions, André-Pierre Gignac coming on for Giroud, and Eder replacing Renato Sanches. Nani's mis-hit cross was pushed away by Lloris before he caught Quaresma's subsequent overhead kick. Umtiti was then booked and Nani's 25-yard (23 m) left-footed strike went over the France crossbar. In the 84th minute, Sissoko ran with the ball, shooting from around 25 yards (23 m), but his strike was kept out by Rui Patrício. Two minutes into stoppage time, Evra played in a low cross to Gignac, who beat Pepe and struck the ball against the inside of the Portugal goalpost. Regular time ended with the score still 0–0 and the match proceeded into extra time.

==== Extra time ====
France kicked off the first half of extra time, and four minutes in, Eder won a free-kick after being fouled by Umtiti. Quaresma sent in a curling pass from around 35 yards (32 m) and Pepe headed it wide although he was offside. Raphaël Guerreiro was then booked for a foul on Sissoko before Blaise Matuidi was shown the yellow card for fouling Eder. Carvalho was booked a minute later for a professional foul on Coman. A minute before half-time, Portugal won a corner which was taken by Quaresma. Eder headed the ball goalwards and Lloris pushed it away before his defence cleared it. Three minutes into the second half, Laurent Koscielny was shown the yellow card for handball (although television replays appeared to show the ball had actually struck Eder's hand) and Guerreiro's subsequent free kick from around 25 yards (23 m) struck the underside of the France crossbar. A minute later, Portugal took the lead through Eder: he received the ball, held off Koscielny before running infield, and struck it from 25 yards (23 m) with a low shot that beat Lloris to his right. France immediately brought on Anthony Martial to replace Sissoko. Rui Patrício then caught a cross from Evra before Nani shot high after Portugal had made a break from a France corner. In the 114th minute, Pogba was booked for pushing João Mário. With four minutes remaining, Nani's cross was cleared by Sagna, who also made a tackle on João Mário in the final minute of extra time. After two minutes of stoppage time, the final whistle was blown and Portugal won the match 1–0.

=== Details ===
10 July 2016
21:00 CEST

Portugal	1–0 (a.e.t.)	France
Eder 109'	Report

Stade de France, Saint-Denis
Attendance: 75,868
Referee: Mark Clattenburg (England)

Portugal	France

GK	1	Rui Patrício	(yellow card) 120+3'
RB	21	Cédric	(yellow card) 34'
CB	3	Pepe
CB	4	José Fonte	(yellow card) 119'
LB	5	Raphaël Guerreiro	(yellow card) 95'
DM	14	William Carvalho	(yellow card) 98'
RW	16	Renato Sanches		(substituted off) 79'
AM	23	Adrien Silva		(substituted off) 66'
LW	10	João Mário	(yellow card) 62'
CF	17	Nani
CF	7	Cristiano Ronaldo (c)		(substituted off) 25'
Substitutions:
FW	20	Ricardo Quaresma		(substituted on) 25'
MF	8	João Moutinho		(substituted on) 66'
FW	9	Eder		(substituted on) 79'
Manager:
Fernando Santos

GK	1	Hugo Lloris (c)
RB	19	Bacary Sagna
CB	21	Laurent Koscielny	(yellow card) 107'
CB	22	Samuel Umtiti	(yellow card) 80'
LB	3	Patrice Evra
RM	18	Moussa Sissoko		(substituted off) 110'
CM	15	Paul Pogba	(yellow card) 115'
CM	14	Blaise Matuidi	(yellow card) 97'
LM	8	Dimitri Payet		(substituted off) 58'
SS	7	Antoine Griezmann
CF	9	Olivier Giroud		(substituted off) 78'
Substitutions:
MF	20	Kingsley Coman		(substituted on) 58'
FW	10	André-Pierre Gignac		(substituted on) 78'
FW	11	Anthony Martial		(substituted on) 110'
Manager:
Didier Deschamps

Man of the Match:
Pepe (Portugal)

Assistant referees:
Simon Beck (England)
Jake Collin (England)
Fourth official:
Viktor Kassai (Hungary)
Additional assistant referees:
Anthony Taylor (England)
Andre Marriner (England)
Reserve assistant referee:
György Ring (Hungary)

Match rules

- 90 minutes
- 30 minutes of extra time if necessary
- Penalty shoot-out if scores still level
- Maximum of three substitutions

=== Statistics ===
First half
Statistic	Portugal	France
Goals scored	0	0
Total shots	4	7
Shots on target	0	3
Saves	3	0
Ball possession	45%	55%
Corner kicks	2	3
Fouls committed	2	2
Offsides	0	0
Yellow cards	1	0
Red cards	0	0

Second half
Statistic	Portugal	France
Goals scored	0	0
Total shots	2	10
Shots on target	1	4
Saves	4	2
Ball possession	48%	52%
Corner kicks	1	3
Fouls committed	7	4
Offsides	0	1
Yellow cards	1	1
Red cards	0	0

Extra time
Statistic	Portugal	France
Goals scored	1	0
Total shots	3	1
Shots on target	2	0
Saves	0	1
Ball possession	48%	52%
Corner kicks	2	3
Fouls committed	3	7
Offsides	1	1
Yellow cards	4	3
Red cards	0	0

Overall
Statistic	Portugal	France
Goals scored	1	0
Total shots	9	18
Shots on target	3	7
Saves	7	3
Ball possession	47%	53%
Corner kicks	5	9
Fouls committed	12	13
Offsides	1	2
Yellow cards	6	4
Red cards	0	0

== Post-match ==
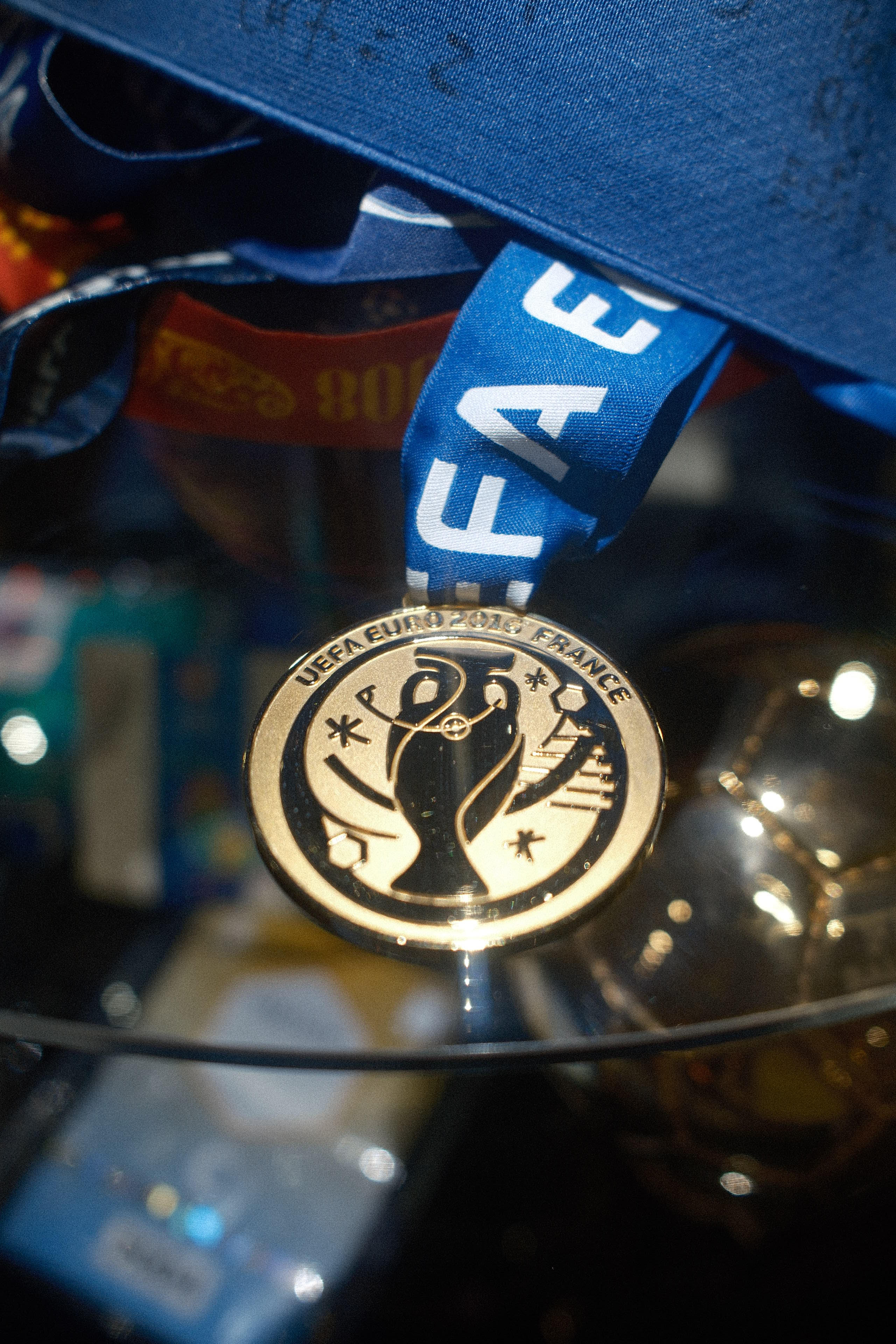
2016 UEFA Euro winner's medal on display in the Museu CR7

Portugal's Pepe was named man of the match. ESPN said that the winning strike was "brilliantly taken" and "one that deserved to win any final". Griezmann was given the player of the tournament award, and six players, four from Portugal and two from France, were named in the UEFA team of the tournament. The match was Portugal's first competitive win against France and first overall win against France since 1975, and gave Portugal their first major trophy. The win also qualified Portugal for the 2017 FIFA Confederations Cup in Russia, marking their first appearance in the competition, and the first time that three countries from the same confederation participated in the competition (hosts Russia, world champions Germany, and European champions Portugal).

In winning the final, Portugal became the tenth different nation to win the European Championship, twelve years after losing their first final at home in the 2004 tournament. France became the second host team to lose the final, after Portugal in 2004. This was the fifth European Championship final to end in a draw after 90 minutes of play and the first to finish goalless. It was also the second whose winners were decided by extra time, after the inaugural final in 1960.

Signed from Benfica a few weeks before the tournament, Bayern Munich's Renato Sanches became the youngest player to win the European Championship at 18 years and 328 days. Sanches was later named the Young Player of the Tournament by UEFA. Ronaldo described the victory as "one of the happiest moments of my career ... This is a unique moment for me. It's unforgettable." Portugal manager Santos praised the Portugal supporters, suggesting they had "lifted our souls", and reflected on Eder: "The ugly duckling scored! Now he's the beautiful swan!" He remarked that his team were "as simple as doves, and as wise as serpents." His counterpart, Didier Deschamps, was downcast, noting "the overriding emotion is huge disappointment. It's cruel to lose the final like that." He remarked that "we've missed a unique opportunity to win a Euros in our own country. There are no words." His captain, Lloris, explained that his side had not made the best of their opportunities but was magnanimous in defeat, praising his opposition: "We need to congratulate Portugal as they were very strong mentally throughout the tournament."

Portuguese newspaper Jornal de Notícias suggested the victory was "the greatest moment in the history of Portuguese football", and A Bola announced every Portugal player to be a "hero". France's L'Équipe declared that they were "devastated" and viewed the future of the side with pessimism, suggesting "it's far from certain that they will bounce back quickly". Le Parisien took solace from the fact that Griezmann ended the tournament as top scorer, with the highest total since Michel Platini in Euro 1984. Diario AS in Spain criticised Portugal's approach, suggesting they "certainly didn't play football to go down in the annals of the beautiful game" while Italy's Corriere della Sera reported that "they fully deserved this triumph". Le Monde later reported that the tournament had generated €1.22 billion in revenue to the country in contrast to the cost of hosting it, estimated at less than €200 million. The same publication listed the 2016 final as 10th in its top 30 Euro matches.

In the next international tournament, the 2018 FIFA World Cup, Portugal were eliminated in the first knockout round by Uruguay, after finishing the group stage in second place behind Spain. France, led once again by Deschamps, won the tournament, beating Croatia 4–2 in the final. Portugal failed to defend their European Championship title at UEFA Euro 2020, losing to Belgium in the round of 16, and France were also eliminated at that stage, suffering defeat to Switzerland in a penalty shoot-out.

== See also ==
- France at the UEFA European Championship
- Portugal at the UEFA European Championship
