= List of international goals scored by Cristiano Ronaldo =

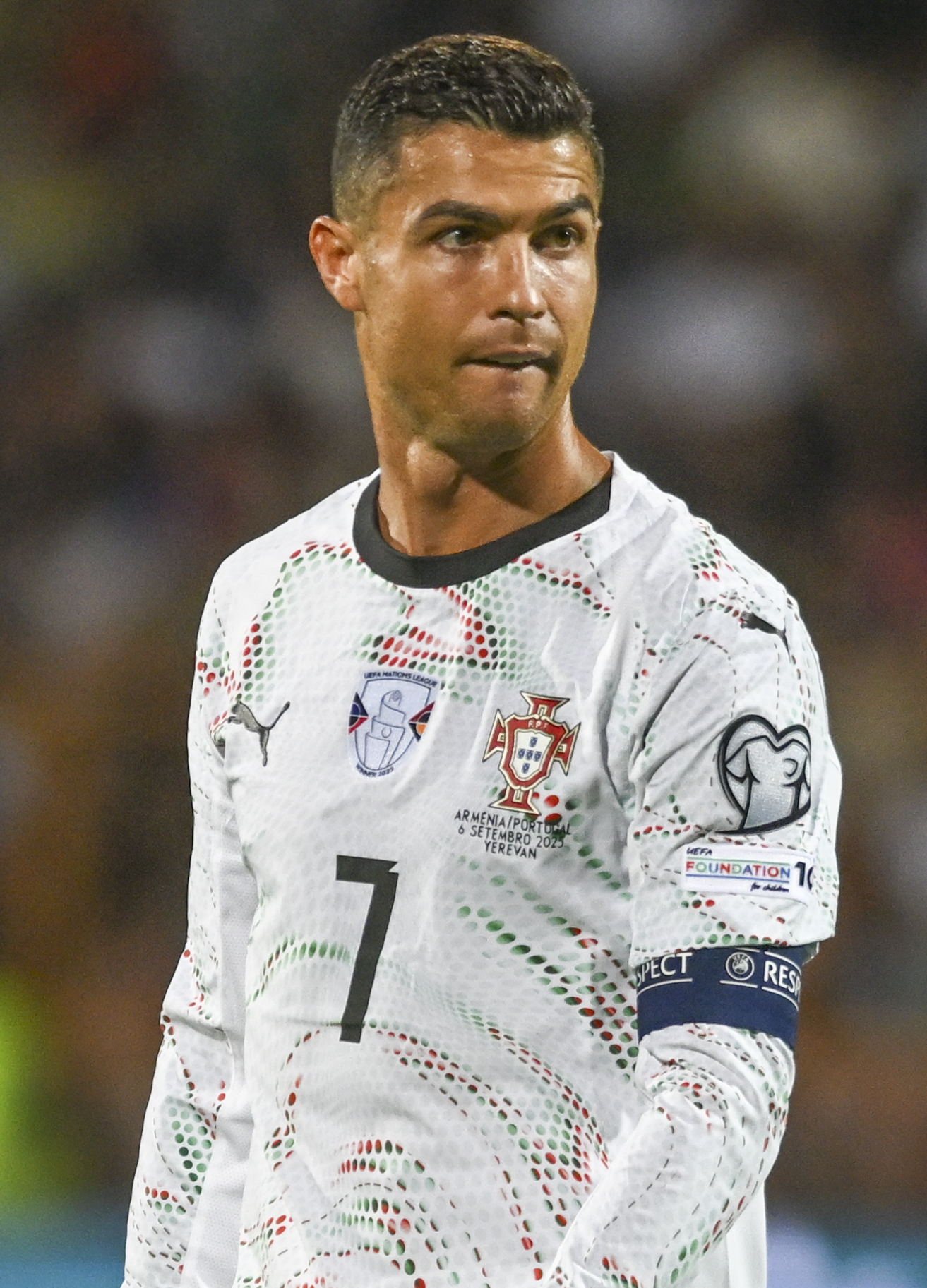
Cristiano Ronaldo (pictured in 2025) scored 146 international goals in his career for Portugal.

Cristiano Ronaldo Dos Santos Aveiro is a Portuguese professional footballer who represented the Portugal national team from his debut on 20 August 2003 in a friendly against Kazakhstan until announcing his retirement on 5 November 2026. He scored his first international goal on 12 June 2004, during a UEFA Euro 2004 group stage match against Greece. In his international career, he became the all-time record goalscorer for the Portugal national team, and the highest overall men's international goalscorer in history, having scored 146 goals in 234 appearances. His 146th and final international goal came on 2 July 2026, when he converted a penalty in Portugal's 2–1 FIFA World Cup round of 32 victory against Croatia.

On 6 September 2013, Ronaldo scored his first ever international hat-trick against Northern Ireland during a 2014 FIFA World Cup qualifier. In total, he scored ten international hat-tricks, and on two occasions, four international goals in a single match. On 5 March 2014, Ronaldo scored twice in Portugal's 5–1 friendly win over Cameroon to take his tally to 49 goals, thus becoming his country's all-time leading goalscorer, surpassing the 47 set by Pauleta. He scored the only goal in a UEFA Euro 2016 qualifying match against Armenia on 14 November 2014, his 23rd goal in UEFA European Championship qualifying and finals matches, surpassing the record previously held by Turkey's Hakan Şükür and Denmark's Jon Dahl Tomasson. On 20 June 2018, Ronaldo scored his 85th goal for Portugal in a 1–0 win over Morocco at the 2018 World Cup, surpassing Hungary's Ferenc Puskás as the all-time top scorer for a European national team. On 8 September 2020, he scored his 100th and 101st goals for Portugal in a 2–0 win against Sweden in the 2020–21 UEFA Nations League, to become the first European player to reach this milestone. Ronaldo scored his 108th and 109th international goals in a UEFA Euro 2020 draw against France on 23 June 2021, surpassing Iran's Ali Daei as the outright leading scorer in men's international football.

Ronaldo participated in fifteen major international tournaments: six UEFA European Championships in 2004, 2008, 2012, 2016, 2020 (played in 2021) and 2024, six FIFA World Cups in 2006, 2010, 2014, 2018, 2022 and 2026, one FIFA Confederations Cup in 2017, and two UEFA Nations League Finals in 2019 and 2025, scoring in all of them but Euro 2024. Following Portugal's win at UEFA Euro 2016, Ronaldo lifted the trophy as his team's captain, and was also awarded the Silver Boot as the joint second-highest goalscorer of the tournament, with three goals and three assists; he was also named to the team of the tournament for the third time in his career. He scored a record 14 goals at the European Championships, 11 at the World Cup, 15 in the UEFA Nations League and two at the Confederations Cup. Ronaldo scored 41 goals in FIFA World Cup qualifiers and 41 goals in UEFA Euro qualifiers, hence becoming the first player to score more than fifty goals in European qualification matches. His other 22 goals came from friendly matches. The opponent against whom he scored most was Luxembourg, with eleven goals. He scored 16 international goals at Estádio Algarve, his most at a single ground. On 12 October 2021, Ronaldo scored his tenth international hat-trick, surpassing the record that was set by Sven Rydell with Sweden.

== Youth goals ==
Ronaldo represented the under-15, under-17, under-20, under-21, and under-23 national sides. Ronaldo made his international youth team debut for Portugal on 24 February 2001 against South Africa in a friendly in Torres Novas, Portugal, under the management of Carlos Dinis. He made 34 youth caps, scoring 18 goals overall. Ronaldo participated in numerous youth competitions, including the 2001 European Youth Summer Olympic Festival, 2002 UEFA European Under-17 Championship, 2003 Toulon Tournament and the 2004 Summer Olympics.

Scores and results list Cristiano Ronaldo's team's goal tally first.

All youth international goals scored by Cristiano Ronaldo
No.	Team	Cap	Date	Venue	Opponent	Score	Result	Competition	Ref.
1	Portugal U15	1	24 February 2001	Estádio Municipal Dr. Alves Pereira, Torres Novas, Portugal	South Africa U15	2–0	2–1	Friendly	
2	Portugal U15	2	25 February 2001	Estádio Municipal Dr. Alves Pereira, Torres Novas, Portugal	Sweden U15	2–1	2–1	Friendly	
3	Portugal U15	4	11 April 2001	France	France U15	1–0	2–2	Tournoi de Montaigu 2001 (France)	
4	Portugal U15	6	14 April 2001	France	Japan U15	1–0	7–0	Tournoi de Montaigu 2001 (France)	
5	Portugal U15	6	14 April 2001	France	Japan U15	3–0	7–0	Tournoi de Montaigu 2001 (France)	
6	Portugal U15	6	14 April 2001	France	Japan U15	5–0	7–0	Tournoi de Montaigu 2001 (France)	
7	Portugal U15	9	25 July 2001	Estadio de La Condomina, Murcia, Spain	Finland U15	1–0	1–3	2001 European Youth Summer Olympic Festival	
8	Portugal U17	1	10 October 2001	Estádio Municipal José dos Santos Pinto, Covilhã, Portugal	Netherlands U17	2–0	3–0	Friendly	
9	Portugal U17	3	13 December 2001	Estádio Municipal Miróbriga, Santiago do Cacém, Portugal	England U17	1–1	1–1	Friendly	
10	Portugal U17	4	6 March 2002	Estadi Nacional, Andorra la Vella, Andorra	San Marino U17	2–0	2–0	2002 UEFA European Under-17 Championship qualifying	
11	Portugal U17	5	8 March 2002	Estadi Nacional, Andorra la Vella, Andorra	Andorra U17	1–0	4–0	2002 UEFA European Under-17 Championship qualifying	
12	Portugal U17	5	8 March 2002	Estadi Nacional, Andorra la Vella, Andorra	Andorra U17	3–0	4–0	2002 UEFA European Under-17 Championship qualifying	
13	Portugal U21	1	19 November 2002	Estádio Adelino Ribeiro Novo, Barcelos, Portugal	Greece U21	2–0	2–0	Friendly	
14	Portugal U21	3	28 March 2003	Estádio Municipal de Rio Maior, Rio Maior, Portugal	England U21	4–2	4–2	2004 UEFA European Under-21 Championship qualification	
15	Portugal U20	1	11 June 2003	Stade des Costières, Nîmes, France	England U20	3–0	3–0	2003 Toulon Tournament	
16	Portugal U21	10	18 November 2003	Stade Gabriel-Montpied, Clermont-Ferrand, France	France U21	1–0	2–1	2004 UEFA European Under-21 Championship qualification play-offs	
17	Portugal U23	1	4 August 2004	Estádio Algarve, Algarve, Portugal	Paraguay U23	2–0	5–0	Friendly	
18	Portugal U23	3	15 August 2004	Pankritio Stadium, Heraklion, Greece	Morocco U23	2–0	2–1	2004 Summer Olympics	

== Goals ==
Portugal score listed first, score column indicates score after each Ronaldo goal

Table key
‡	Indicates goal was scored from a penalty kick
	Indicates Portugal won the match
	Indicates the match ended in a draw (a penalty shoot-out is statistically a draw regardless of shoot-out results)
	Indicates Portugal lost the match

No.	Cap	Date	Venue	Opponent	Score	Result	Competition	Ref.
1	8	12 June 2004	Estádio do Dragão, Porto, Portugal	Greece	1–2	1–2	UEFA Euro 2004	
2	12	30 June 2004	Estádio José Alvalade, Lisbon, Portugal	Netherlands	1–0	2–1	UEFA Euro 2004	
3	14	4 September 2004	Skonto Stadium, Riga, Latvia	Latvia	1–0	2–0	2006 FIFA World Cup qualification	
4	15	8 September 2004	Estádio Dr. Magalhães Pessoa, Leiria, Portugal	Estonia	1–0	4–0	2006 FIFA World Cup qualification	
5	17	13 October 2004	Estádio José Alvalade, Lisbon, Portugal	Russia	2–0	7–1	2006 FIFA World Cup qualification	
6	17	13 October 2004	Estádio José Alvalade, Lisbon, Portugal	Russia	4–0	7–1	2006 FIFA World Cup qualification	
7	18	17 November 2004	Stade Josy Barthel, Luxembourg City, Luxembourg	Luxembourg	2–0	5–0	2006 FIFA World Cup qualification	
8	22	4 June 2005	Estádio da Luz, Lisbon, Portugal	Slovakia	2–0	2–0	2006 FIFA World Cup qualification	
9	23	8 June 2005	A. Le Coq Arena, Tallinn, Estonia	Estonia	1–0	1–0	2006 FIFA World Cup qualification	
10	30	1 March 2006	LTU Arena, Düsseldorf, Germany	Saudi Arabia	1–0	3–0	Friendly	
11	30	1 March 2006	LTU Arena, Düsseldorf, Germany	Saudi Arabia	3–0	3–0	Friendly	
12	34	17 June 2006	Waldstadion, Frankfurt, Germany	Iran	2–0‡	2–0	2006 FIFA World Cup	
13	41	7 October 2006	Estádio do Bessa, Porto, Portugal	Azerbaijan	1–0	3–0	UEFA Euro 2008 qualifying	
14	41	7 October 2006	Estádio do Bessa, Porto, Portugal	Azerbaijan	3–0	3–0	UEFA Euro 2008 qualifying	
15	43	15 November 2006	Estádio Cidade de Coimbra, Coimbra, Portugal	Kazakhstan	2–0	3–0	UEFA Euro 2008 qualifying	
16	45	24 March 2007	Estádio José Alvalade, Lisbon, Portugal	Belgium	2–0	4–0	UEFA Euro 2008 qualifying	
17	45	24 March 2007	Estádio José Alvalade, Lisbon, Portugal	Belgium	4–0	4–0	UEFA Euro 2008 qualifying	
18	47	22 August 2007	Hanrapetakan Stadium, Yerevan, Armenia	Armenia	1–1	1–1	UEFA Euro 2008 qualifying	
19	48	8 September 2007	Estádio da Luz, Lisbon, Portugal	Poland	2–1	2–2	UEFA Euro 2008 qualifying	
20	51	17 October 2007	Almaty Central Stadium, Almaty, Kazakhstan	Kazakhstan	2–0	2–1	UEFA Euro 2008 qualifying	
21	57	11 June 2008	Stade de Genève, Geneva, Switzerland	Czech Republic	2–1	3–1	UEFA Euro 2008	
22	62	11 February 2009	Estádio Algarve, Faro, Portugal	Finland	1–0‡	1–0	Friendly	
23	74	21 June 2010	Cape Town Stadium, Cape Town, South Africa	North Korea	6–0	7–0	2010 FIFA World Cup	
24	77	8 October 2010	Estádio do Dragão, Porto, Portugal	Denmark	3–1	3–1	UEFA Euro 2012 qualifying	
25	78	12 October 2010	Laugardalsvöllur, Reykjavík, Iceland	Iceland	1–0	3–1	UEFA Euro 2012 qualifying	
26	80	9 February 2011	Stade de Genève, Geneva, Switzerland	Argentina	1–1	1–2	Friendly	
27	82	10 August 2011	Estádio Algarve, Faro, Portugal	Luxembourg	2–0	5–0	Friendly	
28	83	2 September 2011	GSP Stadium, Nicosia, Cyprus	Cyprus	1–0‡	4–0	UEFA Euro 2012 qualifying	
29	83	2 September 2011	GSP Stadium, Nicosia, Cyprus	Cyprus	2–0	4–0	UEFA Euro 2012 qualifying	
30	85	11 October 2011	Parken Stadium, Copenhagen, Denmark	Denmark	1–2	1–2	UEFA Euro 2012 qualifying	
31	87	15 November 2011	Estádio da Luz, Lisbon, Portugal	Bosnia and Herzegovina	1–0	6–2	UEFA Euro 2012 qualifying	
32	87	15 November 2011	Estádio da Luz, Lisbon, Portugal	Bosnia and Herzegovina	3–1	6–2	UEFA Euro 2012 qualifying	
33	93	17 June 2012	Metalist Stadium, Kharkiv, Ukraine	Netherlands	1–1	2–1	UEFA Euro 2012	
34	93	17 June 2012	Metalist Stadium, Kharkiv, Ukraine	Netherlands	2–1	2–1	UEFA Euro 2012	
35	94	21 June 2012	National Stadium, Warsaw, Poland	Czech Republic	1–0	1–0	UEFA Euro 2012	
36	96	15 August 2012	Estádio Algarve, Faro, Portugal	Panama	2–0	2–0	Friendly	
37	97	7 September 2012	Stade Josy Barthel, Luxembourg City, Luxembourg	Luxembourg	1–1	2–1	2014 FIFA World Cup qualification	
38	101	6 February 2013	Estádio D. Afonso Henriques, Guimarães, Portugal	Ecuador	1–1	2–3	Friendly	
39	104	10 June 2013	Stade de Genève, Geneva, Switzerland	Croatia	1–0	1–0	Friendly	
40	105	14 August 2013	Estádio Algarve, Faro, Portugal	Netherlands	1–1	1–1	Friendly	
41	106	6 September 2013	Windsor Park, Belfast, Northern Ireland	Northern Ireland	2–2	4–2	2014 FIFA World Cup qualification	
42	106	6 September 2013	Windsor Park, Belfast, Northern Ireland	Northern Ireland	3–2	4–2	2014 FIFA World Cup qualification	
43	106	6 September 2013	Windsor Park, Belfast, Northern Ireland	Northern Ireland	4–2	4–2	2014 FIFA World Cup qualification	
44	108	15 November 2013	Estádio da Luz, Lisbon, Portugal	Sweden	1–0	1–0	2014 FIFA World Cup qualification	
45	109	19 November 2013	Friends Arena, Solna, Sweden	Sweden	1–0	3–2	2014 FIFA World Cup qualification	
46	109	19 November 2013	Friends Arena, Solna, Sweden	Sweden	2–2	3–2	2014 FIFA World Cup qualification	
47	109	19 November 2013	Friends Arena, Solna, Sweden	Sweden	3–2	3–2	2014 FIFA World Cup qualification	
48	110	5 March 2014	Estádio Dr. Magalhães Pessoa, Leiria, Portugal	Cameroon	1–0	5–1	Friendly	
49	110	5 March 2014	Estádio Dr. Magalhães Pessoa, Leiria, Portugal	Cameroon	5–1	5–1	Friendly	
50	114	26 June 2014	Estádio Nacional Mané Garrincha, Brasília, Brazil	Ghana	2–1	2–1	2014 FIFA World Cup	
51	116	14 October 2014	Parken Stadium, Copenhagen, Denmark	Denmark	1–0	1–0	UEFA Euro 2016 qualifying	
52	117	14 November 2014	Estádio Algarve, Faro, Portugal	Armenia	1–0	1–0	UEFA Euro 2016 qualifying	
53	120	13 June 2015	Vazgen Sargsyan Republican Stadium, Yerevan, Armenia	Armenia	1–1	3–2	UEFA Euro 2016 qualifying	
54	120	13 June 2015	Vazgen Sargsyan Republican Stadium, Yerevan, Armenia	Armenia	2–1	3–2	UEFA Euro 2016 qualifying	
55	120	13 June 2015	Vazgen Sargsyan Republican Stadium, Yerevan, Armenia	Armenia	3–1	3–2	UEFA Euro 2016 qualifying	
56	125	29 March 2016	Estádio Dr. Magalhães Pessoa, Leiria, Portugal	Belgium	2–0	2–1	Friendly	
57	126	8 June 2016	Estádio da Luz, Lisbon, Portugal	Estonia	1–0	7–0	Friendly	
58	126	8 June 2016	Estádio da Luz, Lisbon, Portugal	Estonia	3–0	7–0	Friendly	
59	129	22 June 2016	Parc Olympique Lyonnais, Lyon, France	Hungary	2–2	3–3	UEFA Euro 2016	
60	129	22 June 2016	Parc Olympique Lyonnais, Lyon, France	Hungary	3–3	3–3	UEFA Euro 2016	
61	132	6 July 2016	Parc Olympique Lyonnais, Lyon, France	Wales	1–0	2–0	UEFA Euro 2016	
62	134	7 October 2016	Estádio Municipal de Aveiro, Aveiro, Portugal	Andorra	1–0	6–0	2018 FIFA World Cup qualification	
63	134	7 October 2016	Estádio Municipal de Aveiro, Aveiro, Portugal	Andorra	2–0	6–0	2018 FIFA World Cup qualification	
64	134	7 October 2016	Estádio Municipal de Aveiro, Aveiro, Portugal	Andorra	4–0	6–0	2018 FIFA World Cup qualification	
65	134	7 October 2016	Estádio Municipal de Aveiro, Aveiro, Portugal	Andorra	5–0	6–0	2018 FIFA World Cup qualification	
66	135	10 October 2016	Tórsvøllur, Tórshavn, Faroe Islands	Faroe Islands	4–0	6–0	2018 FIFA World Cup qualification	
67	136	13 November 2016	Estádio Algarve, Faro, Portugal	Latvia	1–0‡	4–1	2018 FIFA World Cup qualification	
68	136	13 November 2016	Estádio Algarve, Faro, Portugal	Latvia	3–1	4–1	2018 FIFA World Cup qualification	
69	137	25 March 2017	Estádio da Luz, Lisbon, Portugal	Hungary	2–0	3–0	2018 FIFA World Cup qualification	
70	137	25 March 2017	Estádio da Luz, Lisbon, Portugal	Hungary	3–0	3–0	2018 FIFA World Cup qualification	
71	138	28 March 2017	Estádio do Marítimo, Funchal, Portugal	Sweden	1–0	2–3	Friendly	
72	139	9 June 2017	Skonto Stadium, Riga, Latvia	Latvia	1–0	3–0	2018 FIFA World Cup qualification	
73	139	9 June 2017	Skonto Stadium, Riga, Latvia	Latvia	2–0	3–0	2018 FIFA World Cup qualification	
74	141	21 June 2017	Spartak Stadium, Moscow, Russia	Russia	1–0	1–0	2017 FIFA Confederations Cup	
75	142	24 June 2017	Krestovsky Stadium, Saint Petersburg, Russia	New Zealand	1–0‡	4–0	2017 FIFA Confederations Cup	
76	144	31 August 2017	Estádio do Bessa, Porto, Portugal	Faroe Islands	1–0	5–1	2018 FIFA World Cup qualification	
77	144	31 August 2017	Estádio do Bessa, Porto, Portugal	Faroe Islands	2–0‡	5–1	2018 FIFA World Cup qualification	
78	144	31 August 2017	Estádio do Bessa, Porto, Portugal	Faroe Islands	4–1	5–1	2018 FIFA World Cup qualification	
79	146	7 October 2017	Estadi Nacional, Andorra la Vella, Andorra	Andorra	1–0	2–0	2018 FIFA World Cup qualification	
80	148	23 March 2018	Letzigrund, Zürich, Switzerland	Egypt	1–1	2–1	Friendly	
81	148	23 March 2018	Letzigrund, Zürich, Switzerland	Egypt	2–1	2–1	Friendly	
82	151	15 June 2018	Fisht Olympic Stadium, Sochi, Russia	Spain	1–0‡	3–3	2018 FIFA World Cup	
83	151	15 June 2018	Fisht Olympic Stadium, Sochi, Russia	Spain	2–1	3–3	2018 FIFA World Cup	
84	151	15 June 2018	Fisht Olympic Stadium, Sochi, Russia	Spain	3–3	3–3	2018 FIFA World Cup	
85	152	20 June 2018	Luzhniki Stadium, Moscow, Russia	Morocco	1–0	1–0	2018 FIFA World Cup	
86	157	5 June 2019	Estádio do Dragão, Porto, Portugal	Switzerland	1–0	3–1	2019 UEFA Nations League Finals	
87	157	5 June 2019	Estádio do Dragão, Porto, Portugal	Switzerland	2–1	3–1	2019 UEFA Nations League Finals	
88	157	5 June 2019	Estádio do Dragão, Porto, Portugal	Switzerland	3–1	3–1	2019 UEFA Nations League Finals	
89	159	7 September 2019	Red Star Stadium, Belgrade, Serbia	Serbia	3–1	4–2	UEFA Euro 2020 qualifying	
90	160	10 September 2019	LFF Stadium, Vilnius, Lithuania	Lithuania	1–0‡	5–1	UEFA Euro 2020 qualifying	
91	160	10 September 2019	LFF Stadium, Vilnius, Lithuania	Lithuania	2–1	5–1	UEFA Euro 2020 qualifying	
92	160	10 September 2019	LFF Stadium, Vilnius, Lithuania	Lithuania	3–1	5–1	UEFA Euro 2020 qualifying	
93	160	10 September 2019	LFF Stadium, Vilnius, Lithuania	Lithuania	4–1	5–1	UEFA Euro 2020 qualifying	
94	161	11 October 2019	Estádio José Alvalade, Lisbon, Portugal	Luxembourg	2–0	3–0	UEFA Euro 2020 qualifying	
95	162	14 October 2019	Olimpiyskiy National Sports Complex, Kyiv, Ukraine	Ukraine	1–2‡	1–2	UEFA Euro 2020 qualifying	
96	163	14 November 2019	Estádio Algarve, Faro, Portugal	Lithuania	1–0‡	6–0	UEFA Euro 2020 qualifying	
97	163	14 November 2019	Estádio Algarve, Faro, Portugal	Lithuania	2–0	6–0	UEFA Euro 2020 qualifying	
98	163	14 November 2019	Estádio Algarve, Faro, Portugal	Lithuania	6–0	6–0	UEFA Euro 2020 qualifying	
99	164	17 November 2019	Stade Josy Barthel, Luxembourg City, Luxembourg	Luxembourg	2–0	2–0	UEFA Euro 2020 qualifying	
100	165	8 September 2020	Friends Arena, Solna, Sweden	Sweden	1–0	2–0	2020–21 UEFA Nations League A	
101	165	8 September 2020	Friends Arena, Solna, Sweden	Sweden	2–0	2–0	2020–21 UEFA Nations League A	
102	168	11 November 2020	Estádio da Luz, Lisbon, Portugal	Andorra	6–0	7–0	Friendly	
103	173	30 March 2021	Stade Josy Barthel, Luxembourg City, Luxembourg	Luxembourg	2–1	3–1	2022 FIFA World Cup qualification	
104	175	9 June 2021	Estádio José Alvalade, Lisbon, Portugal	Israel	2–0	4–0	Friendly	
105	176	15 June 2021	Puskás Aréna, Budapest, Hungary	Hungary	2–0‡	3–0	UEFA Euro 2020	
106	176	15 June 2021	Puskás Aréna, Budapest, Hungary	Hungary	3–0	3–0	UEFA Euro 2020	
107	177	19 June 2021	Allianz Arena, Munich, Germany	Germany	1–0	2–4	UEFA Euro 2020	
108	178	23 June 2021	Puskás Aréna, Budapest, Hungary	France	1–0‡	2–2	UEFA Euro 2020	
109	178	23 June 2021	Puskás Aréna, Budapest, Hungary	France	2–2‡	2–2	UEFA Euro 2020	
110	180	1 September 2021	Estádio Algarve, Faro, Portugal	Republic of Ireland	1–1	2–1	2022 FIFA World Cup qualification	
111	180	1 September 2021	Estádio Algarve, Faro, Portugal	Republic of Ireland	2–1	2–1	2022 FIFA World Cup qualification	
112	181	9 October 2021	Estádio Algarve, Faro, Portugal	Qatar	1–0	3–0	Friendly	
113	182	12 October 2021	Estádio Algarve, Faro, Portugal	Luxembourg	1–0‡	5–0	2022 FIFA World Cup qualification	
114	182	12 October 2021	Estádio Algarve, Faro, Portugal	Luxembourg	2–0	5–0	2022 FIFA World Cup qualification	
115	182	12 October 2021	Estádio Algarve, Faro, Portugal	Luxembourg	5–0	5–0	2022 FIFA World Cup qualification	
116	188	5 June 2022	Estádio José Alvalade, Lisbon, Portugal	Switzerland	2–0‡	4–0	2022–23 UEFA Nations League A	
117	188	5 June 2022	Estádio José Alvalade, Lisbon, Portugal	Switzerland	3–0	4–0	2022–23 UEFA Nations League A	
118	192	24 November 2022	Stadium 974, Doha, Qatar	Ghana	1–0‡	3–2	2022 FIFA World Cup	
119	197	23 March 2023	Estádio José Alvalade, Lisbon, Portugal	Liechtenstein	3–0‡	4–0	UEFA Euro 2024 qualifying	
120	197	23 March 2023	Estádio José Alvalade, Lisbon, Portugal	Liechtenstein	4–0	4–0	UEFA Euro 2024 qualifying	
121	198	26 March 2023	Stade de Luxembourg, Luxembourg City, Luxembourg	Luxembourg	1–0	6–0	UEFA Euro 2024 qualifying	
122	198	26 March 2023	Stade de Luxembourg, Luxembourg City, Luxembourg	Luxembourg	4–0	6–0	UEFA Euro 2024 qualifying	
123	200	20 June 2023	Laugardalsvöllur, Reykjavík, Iceland	Iceland	1–0	1–0	UEFA Euro 2024 qualifying	
124	202	13 October 2023	Estádio do Dragão, Porto, Portugal	Slovakia	2–0‡	3–2	UEFA Euro 2024 qualifying	
125	202	13 October 2023	Estádio do Dragão, Porto, Portugal	Slovakia	3–1	3–2	UEFA Euro 2024 qualifying	
126	203	16 October 2023	Bilino Polje Stadium, Zenica, Bosnia and Herzegovina	Bosnia and Herzegovina	1–0‡	5–0	UEFA Euro 2024 qualifying	
127	203	16 October 2023	Bilino Polje Stadium, Zenica, Bosnia and Herzegovina	Bosnia and Herzegovina	2–0	5–0	UEFA Euro 2024 qualifying	
128	204	16 November 2023	Rheinpark Stadion, Vaduz, Liechtenstein	Liechtenstein	1–0	2–0	UEFA Euro 2024 qualifying	
129	207	11 June 2024	Estádio Municipal de Aveiro, Aveiro, Portugal	Republic of Ireland	2–0	3–0	Friendly	
130	207	11 June 2024	Estádio Municipal de Aveiro, Aveiro, Portugal	Republic of Ireland	3–0	3–0	Friendly	
131	213	5 September 2024	Estádio da Luz, Lisbon, Portugal	Croatia	2–0	2–1	2024–25 UEFA Nations League A	
132	214	8 September 2024	Estádio da Luz, Lisbon, Portugal	Scotland	2–1	2–1	2024–25 UEFA Nations League A	
133	215	12 October 2024	Kazimierz Górski National Stadium, Warsaw, Poland	Poland	2–0	3–1	2024–25 UEFA Nations League A	
134	217	15 November 2024	Estádio do Dragão, Porto, Portugal	Poland	2–0‡	5–1	2024–25 UEFA Nations League A	
135	217	15 November 2024	Estádio do Dragão, Porto, Portugal	Poland	5–0	5–1	2024–25 UEFA Nations League A	
136	219	23 March 2025	Estádio José Alvalade, Lisbon, Portugal	Denmark	2–1	5–2 (a.e.t.)	2024–25 UEFA Nations League A	
137	220	4 June 2025	Allianz Arena, Munich, Germany	Germany	2–1	2–1	2025 UEFA Nations League Finals	
138	221	8 June 2025	Allianz Arena, Munich, Germany	Spain	2–2	2–2 (a.e.t.) (5–3 p)	2025 UEFA Nations League Finals	
139	222	6 September 2025	Vazgen Sargsyan Republican Stadium, Yerevan, Armenia	Armenia	2–0	5–0	2026 FIFA World Cup qualification	
140	222	6 September 2025	Vazgen Sargsyan Republican Stadium, Yerevan, Armenia	Armenia	4–0	5–0	2026 FIFA World Cup qualification	
141	223	9 September 2025	Puskás Aréna, Budapest, Hungary	Hungary	2–1‡	3–2	2026 FIFA World Cup qualification	
142	225	14 October 2025	Estádio José Alvalade, Lisbon, Portugal	Hungary	1–1	2–2	2026 FIFA World Cup qualification	
143	225	14 October 2025	Estádio José Alvalade, Lisbon, Portugal	Hungary	2–1	2–2	2026 FIFA World Cup qualification	
144	230	23 June 2026	NRG Stadium, Houston, United States	Uzbekistan	1–0	5–0	2026 FIFA World Cup	
145	230	23 June 2026	NRG Stadium, Houston, United States	Uzbekistan	3–0	5–0	2026 FIFA World Cup	
146	232	2 July 2026	BMO Field, Toronto, Canada	Croatia	1–1‡	2–1	2026 FIFA World Cup	

== Hat-tricks ==
No.	Date	Venue	Opponent	Goals	Result	Competition	Ref.
1	6 September 2013	Windsor Park, Belfast, Northern Ireland	Northern Ireland	3 – (68', 77', 83')	4–2	2014 FIFA World Cup qualification	
2	19 November 2013	Friends Arena, Solna, Sweden	Sweden	3 – (50', 77', 79')	3–2	2014 FIFA World Cup qualification	
3	13 June 2015	Republican Stadium, Yerevan, Armenia	Armenia	3 – (29' pen., 55', 58')	3–2	UEFA Euro 2016 qualifying	
4	7 October 2016	Estádio Municipal de Aveiro, Aveiro, Portugal	Andorra	4 – (2', 4', 47', 68')	6–0	2018 FIFA World Cup qualification	
5	31 August 2017	Estádio do Bessa, Porto, Portugal	Faroe Islands	3 – (3', 29' pen., 65')	5–1	2018 FIFA World Cup qualification	
6	15 June 2018	Fisht Olympic Stadium, Sochi, Russia	Spain	3 – (4' pen., 44', 88')	3–3	2018 FIFA World Cup	
7	5 June 2019	Estádio do Dragão, Porto, Portugal	Switzerland	3 – (25', 88', 90')	3–1	2019 UEFA Nations League Finals	
8	10 September 2019	LFF Stadium, Vilnius, Lithuania	Lithuania	4 – (7' pen., 62', 65', 76')	5–1	UEFA Euro 2020 qualifying	
9	14 November 2019	Estádio Algarve, Faro/Loulé, Portugal	Lithuania	3 – (7' pen., 22', 65')	6–0	UEFA Euro 2020 qualifying	
10	12 October 2021	Estádio Algarve, Faro/Loulé, Portugal	Luxembourg	3 – (8' pen., 13' pen., 87')	5–0	2022 FIFA World Cup qualification	

== Statistics ==
Appearances and goals by year
Year	Competitive		Friendly		Total	
Year	Apps	Goals	Apps	Goals	Apps	Goals
2003	—		2	0	2	0
2004	11 (Note: Six appearances and two goals in UEFA Euro 2004, five appearances and five goals in the 2006 FIFA World Cup qualification.)	7	5	0	16	7
2005	7 (Note: Appearances in the 2006 FIFA World Cup qualification.)	2	4	0	11	2
2006	10 (Note: Six appearances and one goal in the 2006 FIFA World Cup, four appearances and three goals in the UEFA Euro 2008 qualifying.)	4	4	2	14	6
2007	9 (Note: Appearances in the UEFA Euro 2008 qualifying.)	5	1	0	10	5
2008	5 (Note: Three appearances and one goal in UEFA Euro 2008, two appearances in the 2010 FIFA World Cup qualification.)	1	3	0	8	1
2009	5 (Note: Appearances in the 2010 FIFA World Cup qualification.)	0	2	1	7	1
2010	6 (Note: Four appearances and one goal in the 2010 FIFA World Cup, two appearances and two goals in the UEFA Euro 2012 qualifying.)	3	5	0	11	3
2011	6 (Note: Appearances in the UEFA Euro 2012 qualifying.)	5	2	2	8	7
2012	9 (Note: Five appearances and three goals in UEFA Euro 2012, four appearances and one goal in the 2014 FIFA World Cup qualification.)	4	4	1	13	5
2013	6 (Note: Appearances in the 2014 FIFA World Cup qualification.)	7	3	3	9	10
2014	5 (Note: Three appearances and one goal in the 2014 FIFA World Cup, two appearances and two goals in the UEFA Euro 2016 qualifying.)	3	4	2	9	5
2015	4 (Note: Appearances in the UEFA Euro 2016 qualifying.)	3	1	0	5	3
2016	10 (Note: Seven appearances and three goals in UEFA Euro 2016, three appearances and seven goals in the 2018 FIFA World Cup qualification.)	10	3	3	13	13
2017	10 (Note: Six appearances and eight goals in the 2018 FIFA World Cup qualification, four appearances and two goals in the 2017 FIFA Confederations Cup.)	10	1	1	11	11
2018	4 (Note: Appearances in the 2018 FIFA World Cup.)	4	3	2	7	6
2019	10 (Note: Eight appearances and eleven goals in the UEFA Euro 2020 qualifying, two appearances and three goals in the 2019 UEFA Nations League Finals.)	14	—		10	14
2020	4 (Note: Appearances in the 2020–21 UEFA Nations League.)	2	2	1	6	3
2021	11 (Note: Seven appearances and six goals in the 2022 FIFA World Cup qualification, four appearances and five goals in UEFA Euro 2020.)	11	3	2	14	13
2022	12 (Note: Two appearances in the 2022 FIFA World Cup qualification, five appearances and two goals in the 2022–23 UEFA Nations League, five appearances and one goal in the 2022 FIFA World Cup.)	3	—		12	3
2023	9 (Note: Appearances in the UEFA Euro 2024 qualifying.)	10	—		9	10
2024	10 (Note: Five appearances in the UEFA Euro 2024, five appearances and five goals in the 2024–25 UEFA Nations League.)	5	2	2	12	7
2025	9 (Note: Four appearances and three goals in the 2024–25 UEFA Nations League, five appearances and five goals in the 2026 FIFA World Cup qualification.)	8	0	0	9	8
2026	6 (Note: Five appearances and three goals in the 2026 FIFA World Cup, one appearance in the 2026–27 UEFA Nations League.)	3	2	0	8	3
Total	178	124	56	22	234	146

Caps and goals by competition
Competition	Caps	Goals
UEFA European Championship qualifying	44	41
FIFA World Cup qualification	52	41
Friendlies	56	22
UEFA European Championship	30	14
UEFA Nations League	21	15
FIFA World Cup	27	11
FIFA Confederations Cup	4	2
Total	234	146

Goals by confederation
Confederation	Teams	Goals
UEFA	36	128
CAF	4	7
AFC	5	7
CONMEBOL	2	2
CONCACAF	1	1
OFC	1	1
Total	49	146

Goals by opponent
Opponent	Goals
Luxembourg	11
Hungary	9
Armenia	7
Lithuania	7
Sweden	7
Andorra	6
Latvia	5
Switzerland	5
Bosnia and Herzegovina	4
Denmark	4
Estonia	4
Faroe Islands	4
Netherlands	4
Poland	4
Republic of Ireland	4
Spain	4
Belgium	3
Croatia	3
Liechtenstein	3
Northern Ireland	3
Russia	3
Slovakia	3
Azerbaijan	2
Cameroon	2
Cyprus	2
Czech Republic	2
Egypt	2
France	2
Germany	2
Ghana	2
Iceland	2
Kazakhstan	2
Saudi Arabia	2
Uzbekistan	2
Argentina	1
Ecuador	1
Finland	1
Greece	1
Iran	1
Israel	1
Morocco	1
New Zealand	1
North Korea	1
Panama	1
Qatar	1
Scotland	1
Serbia	1
Ukraine	1
Wales	1
Total	146

== See also ==
- List of top international men's football goalscorers by country
- List of men's footballers with 100 or more international caps
- List of men's footballers with 50 or more international goals
- List of men's footballers with 1,000 or more official appearances
- List of most expensive association football transfers
- List of career achievements by Cristiano Ronaldo
- List of men's footballers with 500 or more goals
- List of international goals scored by Eusébio
- List of international goals scored by Pauleta
- List of Portugal captains
- List of hat-tricks
