= List of international goals scored by Eusébio =

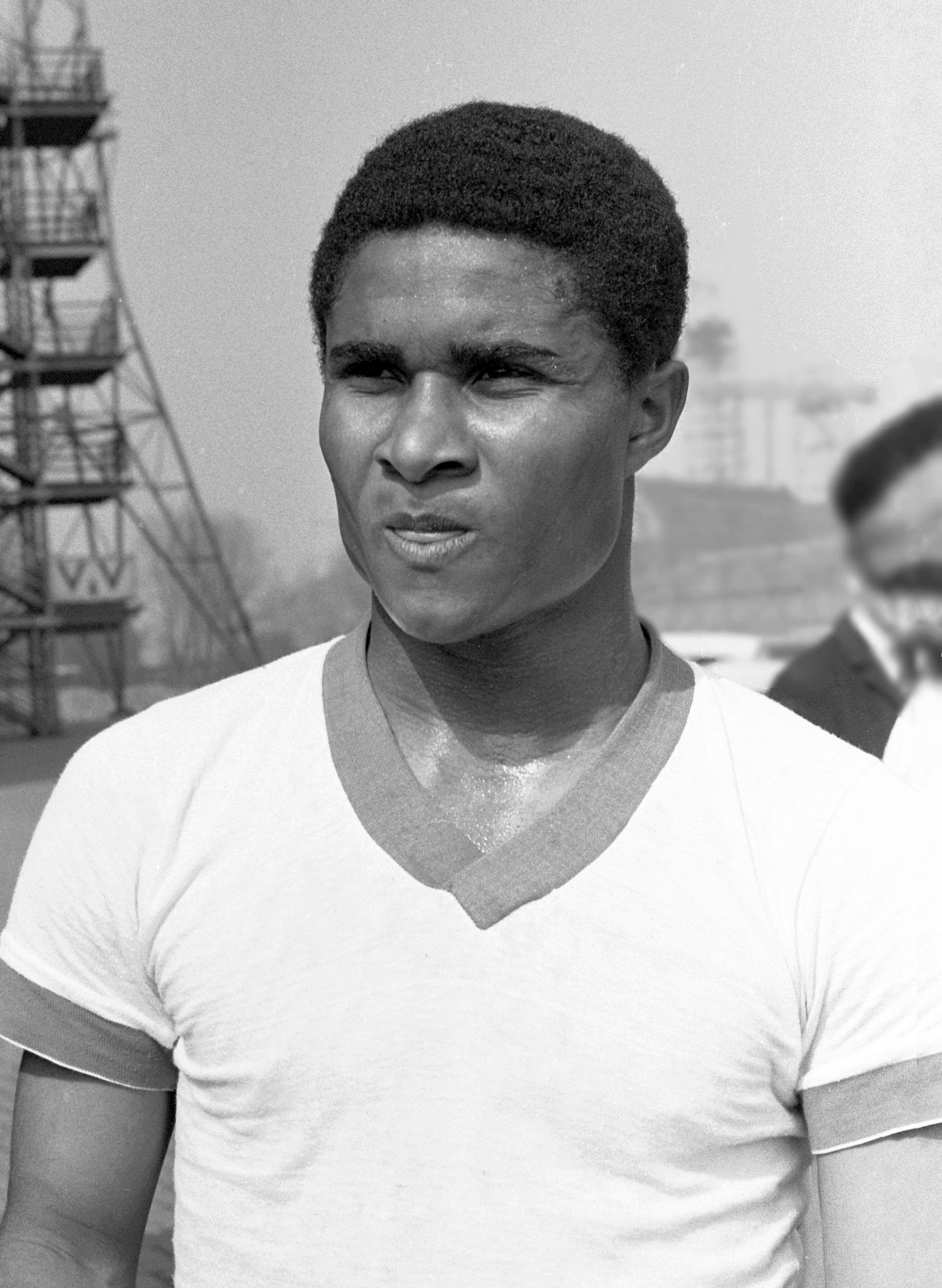
Eusébio

Eusébio was a Portuguese professional footballer who scored 41 goals in 64 matches for the Portugal national football team between 1961 and 1973.

He remained the national team's top scorer of all time until his record was broken by Pauleta in 2005; he is now third with the record being held by Cristiano Ronaldo.

Eusébio was the top scorer at the 1966 FIFA World Cup with nine goals, including four in the quarter-final against North Korea. He scored two international hat-tricks: his haul against North Korea, and three goals in a victory over Turkey in qualification for the tournament.

== Goals ==
#	Date	Venue	Opponent	Score	Result	Competition
1.	8 October 1961	Stade Josy Barthel, Luxembourg City, Luxembourg	Luxembourg	4–1	4–2	1962 World Cup Qualification
2.	17 May 1962	Estádio José Alvalade (1956), Lisbon, Portugal	Belgium	1–2	1–2	Friendly
3.	7 November 1962	Vasil Levski National Stadium, Sofia, Bulgaria	Bulgaria	0–1	3–1	Euro 1964 Preliminary round
4.	3 May 1964	King Baudouin Stadium, Brussels, Belgium	Belgium	0–1	1–2	Friendly
5.	17 May 1964	Estádio Nacional, Lisbon, Portugal	England	3–2	3–4	Friendly
6.	15 November 1964	Estádio das Antas, Porto, Portugal	Spain	1–1	2–1	Friendly
7.	15 November 1964	Estádio das Antas, Porto, Portugal	Spain	2–1	2–1	Friendly
8.	24 January 1965	Estádio Nacional, Lisbon, Portugal	Turkey	2–0	5–1	1966 World Cup Qualification
9.	24 January 1965	Estádio Nacional, Lisbon, Portugal	Turkey	4–1	5–1	1966 World Cup Qualification
10.	24 January 1965	Estádio Nacional, Lisbon, Portugal	Turkey	5–1	5–1	1966 World Cup Qualification
11.	19 April 1965	Ankara 19 Mayıs Stadium, Ankara, Turkey	Turkey	0–1	0–1	1966 World Cup Qualification
12.	25 April 1965	Tehelné pole, Bratislava, Czechoslovakia	Czechoslovakia	0–1	0–1	1966 World Cup Qualification
13.	13 June 1965	Estádio Nacional, Lisbon, Portugal	Romania	1–0	2–1	1966 World Cup Qualification
14.	13 June 1965	Estádio Nacional, Lisbon, Portugal	Romania	2–0	2–1	1966 World Cup Qualification
15.	12 June 1966	Estádio Nacional, Lisbon, Portugal	Norway	1–0	4–0	Friendly
16.	12 June 1966	Estádio Nacional, Lisbon, Portugal	Norway	3–0	4–0	Friendly
17.	21 June 1966	Idrætsparken, Copenhagen, Denmark	Denmark	0–1	1–3	Friendly
18.	16 July 1966	Old Trafford, Manchester, England	Bulgaria	2–0	3–0	1966 FIFA World Cup
19.	19 July 1966	Goodison Park, Liverpool, England	Brazil	2–0	3–1	1966 FIFA World Cup
20.	19 July 1966	Goodison Park, Liverpool, England	Brazil	3–1	3–1	1966 FIFA World Cup
21.	23 July 1966	Goodison Park, Liverpool, England	North Korea	1–3	5–3	1966 FIFA World Cup
22.	23 July 1966	Goodison Park, Liverpool, England	North Korea	2–3	5–3	1966 FIFA World Cup
23.	23 July 1966	Goodison Park, Liverpool, England	North Korea	3–3	5–3	1966 FIFA World Cup
24.	23 July 1966	Goodison Park, Liverpool, England	North Korea	4–3	5–3	1966 FIFA World Cup
25.	26 July 1966	Wembley Stadium (1923), London, England	England	2–1	2–1	1966 FIFA World Cup
26.	28 July 1966	Wembley Stadium (1923), London, England	Soviet Union	1–0	2–1	1966 FIFA World Cup
27.	27 March 1967	Stadio Olimpico, Rome, Italy	Italy	0–1	1–1	Friendly
28.	8 June 1967	Ullevaal Stadion, Oslo, Norway	Norway	0–1	1–2	Euro 1968 Qualifying
29.	8 June 1967	Ullevaal Stadion, Oslo, Norway	Norway	1–2	1–2	Euro 1968 Qualifying
30.	11 December 1968	Karaiskakis Stadium, Athens, Greece	Greece	4–2	4–2	1970 World Cup Qualification
31.	4 May 1969	Estádio das Antas, Porto, Portugal	Greece	1–2	2–2	1970 World Cup Qualification
32.	2 November 1969	Wankdorf Stadium, Bern, Switzerland	Switzerland	0–1	1–1	1970 World Cup Qualification
33.	21 April 1971	Estádio da Luz (1954), Lisbon, Portugal	Scotland	2–0	2–0	Euro 1972 Qualifying
34.	12 May 1971	Estádio das Antas, Porto, Portugal	Denmark	2–0	5–0	Euro 1972 Qualifying
35.	11 June 1972	Machadão, Natal, Brazil	Ecuador	0–1	0–3	Brazilian Independence Cup
36.	14 June 1972	Estádio do Arruda, Recife, Brazil	Iran	0–1	0–3	Brazilian Independence Cup
37.	18 June 1972	Estádio do Arruda, Recife, Brazil	Chile	1–4	1–4	Brazilian Independence Cup
38.	29 June 1972	Estádio do Maracanã, Rio de Janeiro, Brazil	Argentina	1–2	1–3	Brazilian Independence Cup
39.	3 March 1973	Parc des Princes, Paris, France	France	1–1	1–2	Friendly
40.	3 March 1973	Parc des Princes, Paris, France	France	1–2	1–2	Friendly
41.	28 March 1973	Highfield Road, Coventry, England	Northern Ireland	1–1	1–1	1974 World Cup Qualification

== Hat-tricks ==
No.	Opponent	Goals	Score	Venue	Competition	Date
1	Turkey	3 – (2–0', 4–1', 5–1')	5–1	Estádio Nacional, Lisbon, Portugal	1966 FIFA World Cup qualification	24 January 1965
2	North Korea	4 – (1–3', 2–3', 3–3', 4–3')	5–3	Goodison Park, Liverpool, England	1966 FIFA World Cup	23 July 1966

== See also ==
- List of FIFA World Cup hat-tricks
