= List of international goals scored by Pauleta =

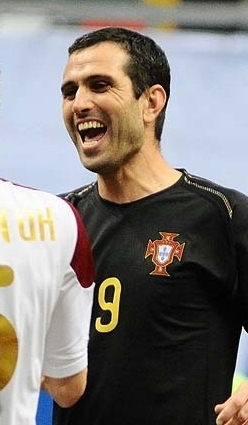
Pauleta in 2011

Pauleta had scored 47 goals in 88 appearances for the Portugal national football team between 1997 and 2006.

On 12 October 2005, he scored twice in a 3–0 win over Latvia at the Estádio do Dragão in Porto in the 2006 FIFA World Cup qualification phase. This took him to 42 goals for Portugal in 77 games, making him the nation's all-time top scorer, surpassing Eusébio, who netted 41 in 64 games between 1961 and 1973. However, he was overtaken by Cristiano Ronaldo in 2014.

Pauleta scored three international hat-tricks against Poland at the 2002 FIFA World Cup, a four-goal haul against Kuwait in 2003 and three goals against Cape Verde in 2006.

== International goals ==
Scores and results list Portugal's goal tally first, score column indicates score after each Pauleta goal.

List of international goals scored by Pauleta
No.	Cap	Date	Venue	Opponent	Score	Result	Competition	Ref.
1	6	26 March 1999	Estádio D. Afonso Henriques, Guimarães, Portugal	Azerbaijan	6–0	7–0	UEFA Euro 2000 qualifying	
2	6	26 March 1999	Estádio D. Afonso Henriques, Guimarães, Portugal	Azerbaijan	7–0	7–0	UEFA Euro 2000 qualifying	
3	8	18 August 1999	Estádio Nacional, Oeiras, Portugal	Andorra	4–0	4–0	Friendly	
4	16	16 August 2000	Estádio do Fontelo, Viseu, Portugal	Lithuania	5–1	5–1	Friendly	
5	19	11 October 2000	De Kuip, Rotterdam, Netherlands	Netherlands	2–0	2–0	2002 FIFA World Cup qualification	
6	21	28 February 2001	Estádio do Marítimo, Funchal, Portugal	Andorra	2–0	3–0	2002 FIFA World Cup qualification	
7	22	28 March 2001	Estádio das Antas, Porto, Portugal	Netherlands	1–2	2–2	2002 FIFA World Cup qualification	
8	25	6 June 2001	Estádio José Alvalade, Lisbon, Portugal	Cyprus	1–0	6–0	2002 FIFA World Cup qualification	
9	25	6 June 2001	Estádio José Alvalade, Lisbon, Portugal	Cyprus	4–0	6–0	2002 FIFA World Cup qualification	
10	27	1 September 2001	Camp d'Esports, Lleida, Spain	Andorra	2–0	7–1	2002 FIFA World Cup qualification	
11	28	5 September 2001	Antonis Papadopoulos Stadium, Larnaca, Cyprus	Cyprus	2–1	3–1	2002 FIFA World Cup qualification	
12	29	6 October 2001	Estádio da Luz, Lisbon, Portugal	Estonia	3–0	5–0	2002 FIFA World Cup qualification	
13	34	25 May 2002	Estádio Campo Desportivo, Taipa, Macau	China	2–0	2–0	Friendly	
14	36	10 June 2002	Jeonju World Cup Stadium, Jeonju, South Korea	Poland	1–0	4–0	2002 FIFA World Cup	
15	36	10 June 2002	Jeonju World Cup Stadium, Jeonju, South Korea	Poland	2–0	4–0	2002 FIFA World Cup	
16	36	10 June 2002	Jeonju World Cup Stadium, Jeonju, South Korea	Poland	3–0	4–0	2002 FIFA World Cup	
17	39	12 October 2002	Estádio do Restelo, Lisbon, Portugal	Tunisia	1–0	1–1	Friendly	
18	41	20 November 2002	Estádio 1º de Maio, Braga, Portugal	Scotland	1–0	2–0	Friendly	
19	41	20 November 2002	Estádio 1º de Maio, Braga, Portugal	Scotland	2–0	2–0	Friendly	
20	43	29 March 2003	Estádio das Antas, Porto, Portugal	Brazil	1–0	2–1	Friendly	
21	50	10 September 2003	Ullevaal Stadion, Oslo, Norway	Norway	1–0	1–0	Friendly	
22	51	11 October 2003	Estádio do Restelo, Lisbon, Portugal	Albania	4–2	5–3	Friendly	
23	52	15 November 2003	Estádio Municipal de Aveiro, Aveiro, Portugal	Greece	1–1	1–1	Friendly	
24	53	19 November 2003	Estádio Dr. Magalhães Pessoa, Leiria, Portugal	Kuwait	1–0	8–0	Friendly	
25	53	19 November 2003	Estádio Dr. Magalhães Pessoa, Leiria, Portugal	Kuwait	2–0	8–0	Friendly	
26	53	19 November 2003	Estádio Dr. Magalhães Pessoa, Leiria, Portugal	Kuwait	4–0	8–0	Friendly	
27	53	19 November 2003	Estádio Dr. Magalhães Pessoa, Leiria, Portugal	Kuwait	5–0	8–0	Friendly	
28	54	18 February 2004	Estádio Algarve, Faro-Loulé, Portugal	England	1–1	1–1	Friendly	
29	56	28 April 2004	Estádio Cidade de Coimbra, Coimbra, Portugal	Sweden	1–1	2–2	Friendly	
30	57	5 June 2004	Estádio do Bonfim, Setúbal, Portugal	Lithuania	2–0	4–1	Friendly	
31	63	4 September 2004	Skonto Stadium, Riga, Latvia	Latvia	2–0	2–0	2006 FIFA World Cup qualification	
32	64	8 September 2004	Estádio Dr. Magalhães Pessoa, Leiria, Portugal	Estonia	3–0	4–0	2006 FIFA World Cup qualification	
33	65	9 October 2004	Rheinpark Stadion, Vaduz, Liechtenstein	Liechtenstein	1–0	2–2	2006 FIFA World Cup qualification	
34	66	13 October 2004	Estádio José Alvalade, Lisbon, Portugal	Russia	1–0	7–1	2006 FIFA World Cup qualification	
35	67	17 November 2004	Stade Josy Barthel, Luxembourg City, Luxembourg	Luxembourg	4–0	5–0	2006 FIFA World Cup qualification	
36	67	17 November 2004	Stade Josy Barthel, Luxembourg City, Luxembourg	Luxembourg	5–0	5–0	2006 FIFA World Cup qualification	
37	69	26 March 2005	Estádio Cidade de Barcelos, Barcelos, Portugal	Canada	2–0	4–1	Friendly	
38	74	3 September 2005	Estádio Algarve, Faro-Loulé, Portugal	Luxembourg	3–0	6–0	2006 FIFA World Cup qualification	
39	74	3 September 2005	Estádio Algarve, Faro-Loulé, Portugal	Luxembourg	4–0	6–0	2006 FIFA World Cup qualification	
40	76	8 October 2005	Estádio Municipal de Aveiro, Aveiro, Portugal	Liechtenstein	1–1	2–1	2006 FIFA World Cup qualification	
41	77	12 October 2005	Estádio do Dragão, Porto, Portugal	Latvia	1–0	3–0	2006 FIFA World Cup qualification	
42	77	12 October 2005	Estádio do Dragão, Porto, Portugal	Latvia	2–0	3–0	2006 FIFA World Cup qualification	
43	78	12 November 2005	Estádio Cidade de Coimbra, Coimbra, Portugal	Croatia	2–0	2–0	Friendly	
44	81	27 May 2006	Évora, Portugal	Cape Verde	1–0	4–1	Friendly	
45	81	27 May 2006	Évora, Portugal	Cape Verde	2–1	4–1	Friendly	
46	81	27 May 2006	Évora, Portugal	Cape Verde	4–1	4–1	Friendly	
47	83	11 June 2006	RheinEnergieStadion, Cologne, Germany	Angola	1–0	1–0	2006 FIFA World Cup	

== Hat-tricks ==
No.	Date	Venue	Opponent	Goals	Result	Competition	Ref.
1	10 June 2002	Jeonju World Cup Stadium, Jeonju, South Korea	Poland	3 – (14', 65', 77')	4–0	2002 FIFA World Cup	
2	19 November 2003	Estádio Dr. Magalhães Pessoa, Leiria, Portugal	Kuwait	4 – (11', 21', 46', 53')	8–0	Friendly	
3	27 May 2006	Évora, Portugal	Cape Verde	3 – (1', 38', 83')	4–1	Friendly	

== Statistics ==
Appearances and goals by year
Year	Apps	Goals
1997	3	0
1998	1	0
1999	7	3
2000	9	2
2001	10	7
2002	11	7
2003	12	8
2004	14	9
2005	12	7
2006	9	4
Total	88	47

Goals by competition
Competition	Goals
FIFA World Cup qualification	19
UEFA Euro qualification	2
Friendlies	22
FIFA World Cup	4
Total	47

Goals by opponent
Opponent	Goals
Kuwait	4
Luxembourg	4
Andorra	3
Cape Verde	3
Cyprus	3
Latvia	3
Poland	3
Azerbaijan	2
England	2
Estonia	2
Liechtenstein	2
Lithuania	2
Netherlands	2
Scotland	2
Albania	1
Angola	1
Brazil	1
Canada	1
China	1
Croatia	1
Greece	1
Norway	1
Russia	1
Sweden	1
Tunisia	1
Total	47

== See also ==
- List of FIFA World Cup hat-tricks
