= List of Portugal national football team hat-tricks =

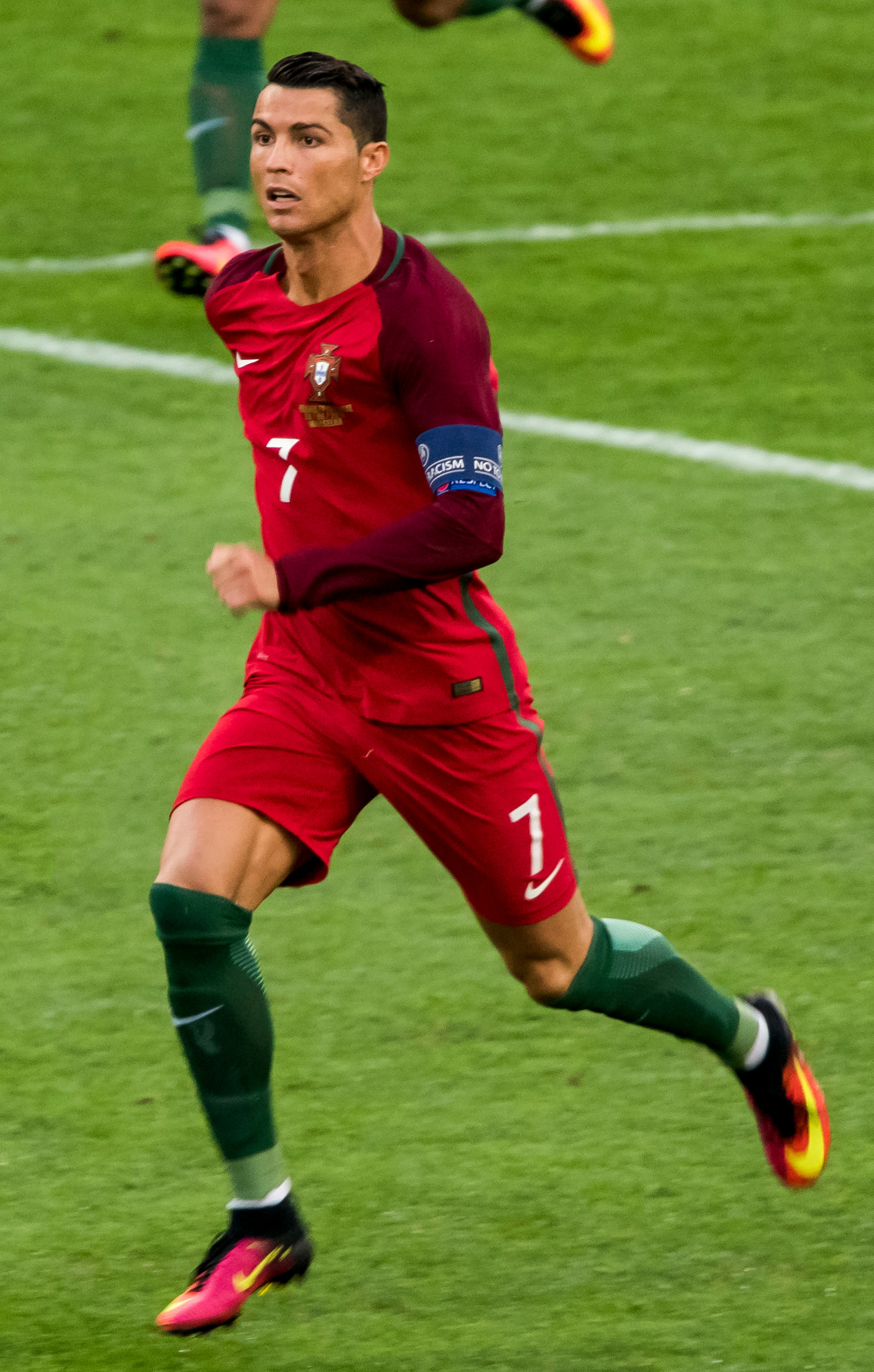
Cristiano Ronaldo holds the record for the most hat-tricks scored by a Portuguese player, with ten

Since Portugal's first international association football match in 1921 against Spain, there have been 30 occasions when a Portuguese player has scored three or more goals (a hat-trick) in a game. The first hat-trick was scored by Valdemar Mota against Italy in 1928. The record for the most goals scored in an international game by a Portuguese player is four, which has been achieved on five occasions: by Eusébio against North Korea at the 1966 World Cup, by Nuno Gomes against Andorra in 2002, by Pauleta against Kuwait in 2003, and the other two by Cristiano Ronaldo, the first against Andorra in 2016 and the second against Lithuania in 2019.

In addition to Eusébio, three other players have scored a hat-trick at the World Cup finals for Portugal; Pauleta in 2002 against Poland, Ronaldo in 2018 against Spain, and Gonçalo Ramos in 2022 against Switzerland. Sérgio Conceição is the only Portuguese player to have scored a hat-trick at the European Championship finals, doing so when he scored all three goals against Germany at Euro 2000.

Ronaldo holds the record for the most hat-tricks scored by a Portuguese player, scoring ten between 2013 and 2021, with the next closest to him being Pauleta with three. André Silva was the youngest Portuguese player to score a hat-trick, at the age of 20 years, 11 months and 4 days against the Faroe Islands. On two occasions, two players have scored a hat-trick for Portugal in the same match; the first occurred UEFA Euro 1996 qualifying, when Ricardo Sá Pinto and João Vieira Pinto both scored three against Liechtenstein, the second during a friendly against Kuwait, when Pauleta and Nuno Gomes achieved the feat, and the third during 2026 FIFA World Cup Qualifiers against the Armenia national football team when Bruno Fernandes and Joao Neves scored three.

== Hat-tricks for Portugal ==
No.	Player	Opponent	Goals (Note: Goals column is sorted by the time elapsed between the first and third goal.)	Score (Note: Portugal's score is shown first. Scores are sorted by goal difference and number of goals in the match.)	Venue	Competition	Date	Ref(s)
1	Valdemar Mota	Italy	3 – (20', 27', 77')	4–1	Campo do Ameal, Porto	Friendly match	14 April 1928	
2	Francisco Palmeiro	Spain	3 – (5', 26', 43')	3–1	Estádio Nacional, Lisbon	Friendly match	3 June 1956	
3	Yaúca	Luxembourg	3 – (53', 66', 83')	6–0	Estádio Nacional, Lisbon	1962 FIFA World Cup qualification	19 March 1961	
4	Eusébio	Turkey	3 – (21', 63', 77')	5–1	Estádio Nacional, Lisbon	1966 FIFA World Cup qualification	24 January 1965	
5	José Torres	Uruguay	3 – (7, 57, 64)	3–0	Estádio Nacional, Lisbon	Friendly match	26 June 1966	
6	Eusébio (2)	North Korea	4 – (27' pen., 43', 56', 59' pen.)	5–3	Goodison Park, Liverpool	1966 FIFA World Cup quarter-final	23 July 1966	
7	Paulo Alves	Liechtenstein	3 – (67', 73', 90')	7–0	Sportpark Eschen-Mauren, Eschen	UEFA Euro 1996 qualifying	15 August 1995	
8	Ricardo Sá Pinto	Liechtenstein	3 – (29', 45', 52')	8–0	Estádio Municipal, Coimbra	UEFA Euro 2000 qualifying	9 June 1999	
9	João Vieira Pinto	Liechtenstein	3 – (40', 59', 67')	8–0	Estádio Municipal, Coimbra	UEFA Euro 2000 qualifying	9 June 1999	
10	Sérgio Conceição	Germany	3 – (35', 54', 71')	3–0	Feijenoord Stadion, Rotterdam	UEFA Euro 2000 group stage	20 June 2000	
11	Luís Figo	Moldova	3 – (43' pen., 61' pen., 89')	3–0	Estádio de São Luís, Faro	Friendly match	15 August 2001	
12	Nuno Gomes	Andorra	4 – (36', 40', 45', 90')	7–1	Camp d'Esports, Lleida	2002 FIFA World Cup qualification	1 September 2001	
13	Pauleta	Poland	3 – (14', 65', 77')	4–0	Jeonju Stadium, Jeonju	2002 FIFA World Cup group stage	10 June 2002	
14	Pauleta (2)	Kuwait	4 – (11', 20', 45', 53')	8–0	Estádio Municipal, Leiria	Friendly match	19 November 2003	
15	Nuno Gomes (2)	Kuwait	3 – (70', 75', 87')	8–0	Estádio Municipal, Leiria	Friendly match	19 November 2003	
16	Pauleta (3)	Cape Verde	3 – (1', 38', 83')	4–1	Complexo Desportivo, Évora	Friendly match	27 May 2006	
17	Cristiano Ronaldo	Northern Ireland	3 – (68', 77', 83')	4–2	Windsor Park, Belfast	2014 FIFA World Cup qualification	6 September 2013	
18	Cristiano Ronaldo (2)	Sweden	3 – (50', 77', 79')	3–2	Friends Arena, Solna	2014 FIFA World Cup qualification	19 November 2013	
19	Cristiano Ronaldo (3)	Armenia	3 – (29' pen., 55', 58')	3–2	Republican Stadium, Yerevan	UEFA Euro 2016 qualifying	13 June 2015	
20	Cristiano Ronaldo (4)	Andorra	4 – (2', 4', 47', 68')	6–0	Estádio Municipal de Aveiro, Aveiro	2018 FIFA World Cup qualification	7 October 2016	
21	André Silva	Faroe Islands	3 – (12', 22', 37')	6–0	Tórsvøllur, Tórshavn	2018 FIFA World Cup qualification	10 October 2016	
22	Cristiano Ronaldo (5)	Faroe Islands	3 – (3', 29' pen., 65')	5–1	Estádio do Bessa, Porto	2018 FIFA World Cup qualification	31 August 2017	
23	Cristiano Ronaldo (6)	Spain	3 – (4' pen., 44', 88')	3–3	Fisht Olympic Stadium, Sochi	2018 FIFA World Cup group stage	15 June 2018	
24	Cristiano Ronaldo (7)	Switzerland	3 – (25', 88', 90')	3–1	Estádio do Dragão, Porto	2019 UEFA Nations League Finals	5 June 2019	
25	Cristiano Ronaldo (8)	Lithuania	4 – (7' pen., 62', 65', 76')	5–1	LFF Stadium, Vilnius	UEFA Euro 2020 qualifying	10 September 2019	
26	Cristiano Ronaldo (9)	Lithuania	3 – (7' pen., 22', 65')	6–0	Estádio Algarve, Faro/Loulé	UEFA Euro 2020 qualifying	14 November 2019	
27	Cristiano Ronaldo (10)	Luxembourg	3 – (8' pen., 13' pen., 87')	5–0	Estádio Algarve, Faro/Loulé	2022 FIFA World Cup qualification	12 October 2021	
28	Gonçalo Ramos	Switzerland	3 – (17', 51', 67')	6–1	Lusail Iconic Stadium, Lusail	2022 FIFA World Cup knockout stage	6 December 2022	
29	Bruno Fernandes	Armenia	3 – (45+3' pen., 51', 72' pen.)	9–1	Estádio do Dragão, Porto	2026 FIFA World Cup qualification	16 November 2025	
30	João Neves	Armenia	3 – (30', 41', 81')	9–1	Estádio do Dragão, Porto	2026 FIFA World Cup qualification	16 November 2025	

== Hat-tricks conceded by Portugal ==
No.	Player	Opponent	Goals	Score	Venue	Competition	Date	Ref(s)
1	José Zabala	Spain	3 – (14', 57', 70')	0–3	Campo de la Reina Victoria, Seville	Friendly match	16 December 1923	
2	Gaspar Rubio	Spain	3 – (2', 9', 20')	0–5	Estadio de la Exposición, Seville	Friendly match	17 March 1929	
3	Isidro Lángara	Spain	5 – (10', 12' pen., 46', 77', 86')	0–9	Estadio Chamartín, Madrid	1934 FIFA World Cup qualification	11 March 1934	
4	Tommy Lawton	England	4 – (2', 11', 38', 61')	0–10	Estádio Nacional, Lisbon	Friendly match	25 May 1947	
5	Stanley Mortensen	England	4 – (1', 59', 71', 77')	0–10	Estádio Nacional, Lisbon	Friendly match	25 May 1947	
6	Ernest Vaast	France	3 – (47', 51', 77')	2–4	Estádio Nacional, Lisbon	Friendly match	23 November 1947	
7	Tom Finney	England	4 – (4' pen., 28', 55', 75' pen.)	3–5	Estádio Nacional, Lisbon	Friendly match	14 May 1950	
8	Erich Probst	Austria	5 – (14', 19', 31', 59', 70')	1–9	Praterstadion, Vienna	1954 FIFA World Cup qualification	27 September 1953	
9	Just Fontaine	France	3 – (3', 54', 58')	3–5	Stade Olympique Yves-du-Manoir, Colombes	Friendly match	11 November 1959	
10	Ady Schmit	Luxembourg	3 – (27', 53', 56')	2–4	Stade Municipal, Luxembourg City	1962 FIFA World Cup qualification	8 October 1961	
11	Johnny Byrne	England	3 – (21', 57', 88')	3–4	Estádio Nacional, Lisbon	Friendly match	17 May 1964	
12	Benny Tabak	Israel	3 – (6', 18', 30')	1–4	Ramat Gan Stadium, Ramat Gan	1982 FIFA World Cup qualification	28 October 1981	
13	Radoslav Zdravkov	Bulgaria	3 – (15' pen., 20', 73')	2–5	Haskovo Stadium, Haskovo	Friendly match	16 December 1981	
14	Luís Fabiano	Brazil	3 – (9', 25', 58')	2–6	Bezerrão, Gama	Friendly match	19 November 2008	
15	Thomas Müller	Germany	3 – (12' pen., 45+1', 78')	0–4	Itaipava Arena Fonte Nova, Salvador	2014 FIFA World Cup group stage	16 June 2014	
