= 2006–07 S.L. Benfica season =

Benfica
2006–07 season
- President: Luís Filipe Vieira
- Head coach: Fernando Santos
- Stadium: Estádio da Luz
- Primeira Liga: 3rd
- Taça de Portugal: Sixth round
- UEFA Champions League: Group stage
- UEFA Cup: Quarter-finals
- Top goalscorer: League: Simão (11); All: Simão (16)
- Highest home attendance: 62,756 v Porto (1 April 2007)
- Lowest home attendance: 22,227 v União de Leiria (21 January 2007)
- Average home league attendance: 33,323
- Biggest win: Benfica 5–0 Oliveira do Bairro (6 January 2007)
- Biggest defeat: Celtic 3–0 Benfica (17 October 2006)
Home colours	Away colours

The 2006–07 European football season was the 103rd season of Sport Lisboa e Benfica's existence and the club's 73rd consecutive season in the top flight of Portuguese football. The season ran from 1 July 2006 to 30 June 2007; Benfica competed domestically in the Primeira Liga and the Taça de Portugal. The club also participated in the UEFA Champions League as a result of finishing third in the Primeira Liga in the previous season.

After manager Ronald Koeman's departure, Benfica immediately searched for a replacement. Media speculated the club would sign Sven-Göran Eriksson and later Carlos Queiroz, but Benfica signed the former Porto and Sporting CP manager Fernando Santos. Santos was the first manager since Fernando Riera to manage all of Portugal's Big Three clubs. In the transfer market, Benfica brought back Rui Costa and recruited other notable players including Katsouranis and David Luiz. Fabrizio Miccoli had his loan renewed for a second year, while Geovanni, Manuel Fernandes and Ricardo Rocha left the club during the season.

Because of their league finish, Benfica had to pass Austria Wien to enter the group stage of the season's Champions League. Domestically, Benfica's season started erratically, losing 11 points from three losses and a draw before December. In Europe, the situation was similar; Benfica never recovered a five-point deficit to Celtic by day three, ending with seven points and demotion to the UEFA Cup. From December until April, Benfica regained lost ground in the Primeira Liga, climbing to second place—a point away from Porto, which was also advancing until the quarter-finals of UEFA Cup

In April, Benfica had the opportunity to reach the league's top place if they won the Clássico with Porto; however, they only managed a 1–1 draw. It was the first of five winless games that caused them to drop to third place and be eliminated from Europe by Espanyol. Despite an improvement in form, Benfica wasted a chance to retake second place after another home draw against arch-rival club Sporting. Benfica ended the season in third place, with two fewer points than Porto, ensuring a place in the Champions League.

== Season summary ==
=== Pre-season ===
In the aftermath of Ronald Koeman's departure, Portuguese media began to speculate about Benfica's next manager. They initially focused on Sven-Göran Eriksson, who had previously managed the club and was in Algarve preparing for the World Cup with England's national squad. On 17 May, Eriksson said he had not been approached to join Benfica. José Antonio Camacho's agent dismissed speculation about his return. On 19 May, SIC Notícias announced Carlos Queiroz had signed a two-year deal with Benfica. Both parties immediately denied any agreement; Queiroz said he did not intend to leave Manchester United. The following day, Benfica presented Fernando Santos as the club's new manager on a two-year contract. Santos had last managed in Portugal in 2003–04, when he led Sporting to a third-place finish, and previously spent three years at Porto, winning five major titles. He became the third manager—the first Portuguese—to manage all of the country's Big Three football clubs, after Otto Glória and Fernando Riera. He would be assisted by Fernando Chalana, who remained connected with the club's management; Jorge Rosário as his long-term technical assistant; Bruno Moura as physiotherapist and Ricardo Santos as scout of the opponents.

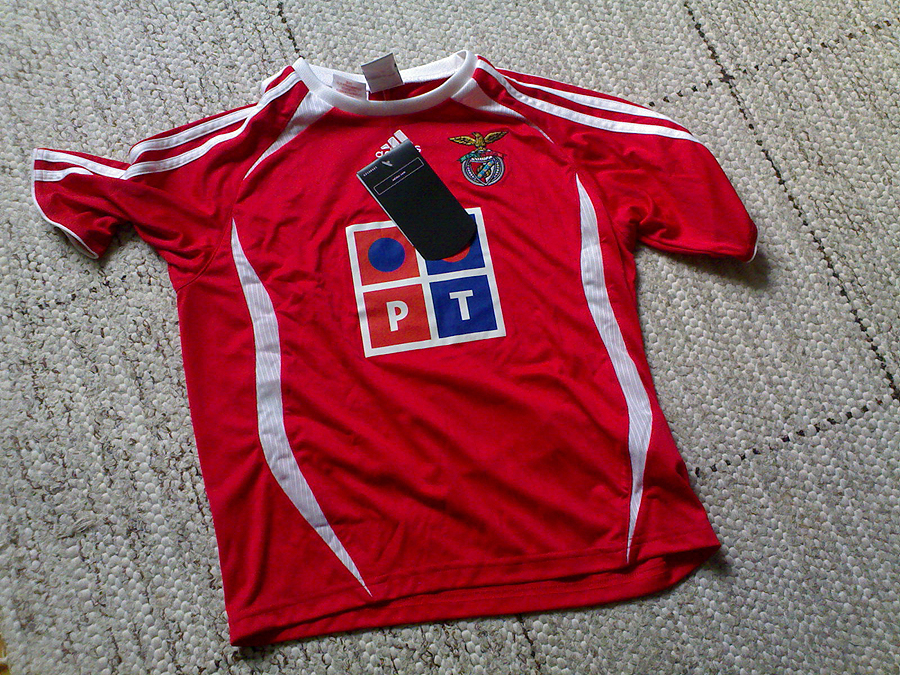
Benfica's home shirt for the season, with the standard Adidas three stripes on the shoulders, plus two horizontal lines near the side; Portugal Telecom remained the shirt sponsor.

Benfica's first signing of the season was Rui Costa nicknamed "The Maestro", who arrived for free and was well received by 3,000 supporters. He reportedly took a large pay cut to join Benfica. After Costa, Benfica selected Kostas Katsouranis as their top target in the search for another central midfielder. They negotiated with AEK Athens for over two weeks and agreed a transfer on 22 June. Benfica was also interested in signing Andrés D'Alessandro, but the deal fell through. In the offence, Fabrizio Miccoli had his loan deal renewed for a further season, and Benfica signed another option, Mexican striker, Francisco Fonseca. The biggest losses for Santos were the release of Geovanni—a regular starter for three-and-a-half seasons— and Manuel Fernandes, who joined Portsmouth on a loan deal.

The pre-season began on 3 July with medical exams during the morning and an afternoon visit to Nyon, where Benfica were camped during their pre-season tour of Switzerland. Santos implemented a new tactical formation based on the 4–4–2 diamond. Benfica played their first game against Swiss second-tier side Stade Nyonnais, beating them by a comfortable margin. They followed this with a win against Shakhtar Donetsk in Yverdon-les-Bains, and a loss against FC Sion at the Stade Tourbillon on 15 July. Benfica returned to Portugal on 16 July; they played a presentation match against Bordeaux on 22 July. They then competed in the 2006 Guadiana Trophy alongside their arch-rivals Sporting CP and Deportivo La Coruña, losing both matches. On 28 July, Benfica took part in the draw for the third qualifying round of the UEFA Champions League; they were paired with Austria Wien. Santos dismissed accusations of favouritism with the Austrians, saying, "It is a question of honour to be present in the Champions League, for me and for Benfica." Benfica's next preparation match was at AEK Athens on 1 August, where they lost for the third time in a row. The result caused concern to Santos because Benfica "showed a lot of tactical problems, both offensively and defensively." Benfica played their final preparation match on 15 August, where they defeated Estrela da Amadora 2–1.

=== August–September ===
Benfica first competitive game of the season was the third qualifying round of the Champions League. Before the match, Santos expressed the importance of reaching the group stage: "More important than the formation used is to fulfil our purpose: take part in the group stage of the competition." On 8 August, Benfica visited the Ernst-Happel-Stadion to play Austria Wien. Benfica scored first with a back-heeled goal from Nuno Gomes in the 16th minute, while Austria equalized through Jocelyn Blanchard in the 36th minute. The match resulted in a draw and Benfica gained a decisive advantage for the second leg. On 22 August, Benfica hosted Austria Wien for the second leg. The opening goal came from Rui Costa, with further Benfica goals scored by Nuno Gomes and Petit. Benfica had joined their rivals Porto and Sporting in the 2006–07 Champions League, marking the first time three Portuguese teams were present in the group stage. On 24 August, Benfica took part in the Champions League draw; they were drawn with Manchester United, Celtic and F.C. Copenhagen. It was second time in a row Benfica played with Manchester United in the group stage after eliminating them in 2005–06. Three days later, Benfica were due to meet Belenenses for the opening game of the Primeira Liga. However, because of the "Mateus Affair," the game was uncertain to occur; Santos expressed hopes for the quick resolution of the case, adding that it was bad for Portuguese football and that the uncertainty caused his players to lose focus. Two days before the match, the Portuguese Professional Football League announced that the game was postponed until the Portuguese Football Federation decided the outcome of the affair.

Benfica's next match was scheduled for 10 September, meaning they would go nearly 20 days without competing in the opening stage of the season. After the international break in early September, their first match in the Primeira Liga was set for 9 September, one day earlier because of their European match against Copeganhen on 13 September. In an away visit to Estádio do Bessa, where Santos had never won in his career, Benfica were defeated 3–0 by Boavista. Santos said the defeat was "heavy and out of context" and blamed the ejection of Nuno Gomes for emotionally destabilizing the team. On the following Wednesday, Benfica played Copenhagen at Parken Stadium. Neither team could break the deadlock and the game ended in goalless draw.

On 17 September, Benfica received Nacional at home. With Simão making his league debut, Benfica scored the only goal of the match when Simão assisted Luisão in the 29th minute. On the following Friday, Benfica played Paços de Ferreira on the road. Katsouranis scored the first goal for Benfica but Paços equalized in the 92nd minute. In Santos' analysis, Benfica controlled the match, but after "an inexplicable ejection from Léo, the home team got back into the game." Four days later, Benfica received Manchester United for the second matchday of the group stage. A single goal from Louis Saha in the 61st minute won United the match and the lead in the group standings. It was Benfica's 12th loss in 20 matches against English teams in Europe and the fifth loss in six matches against United. Santos said Benfica played "60 minutes of great quality," but was disappointed with loss and expressed a desire to improve the situation.

=== October–November ===
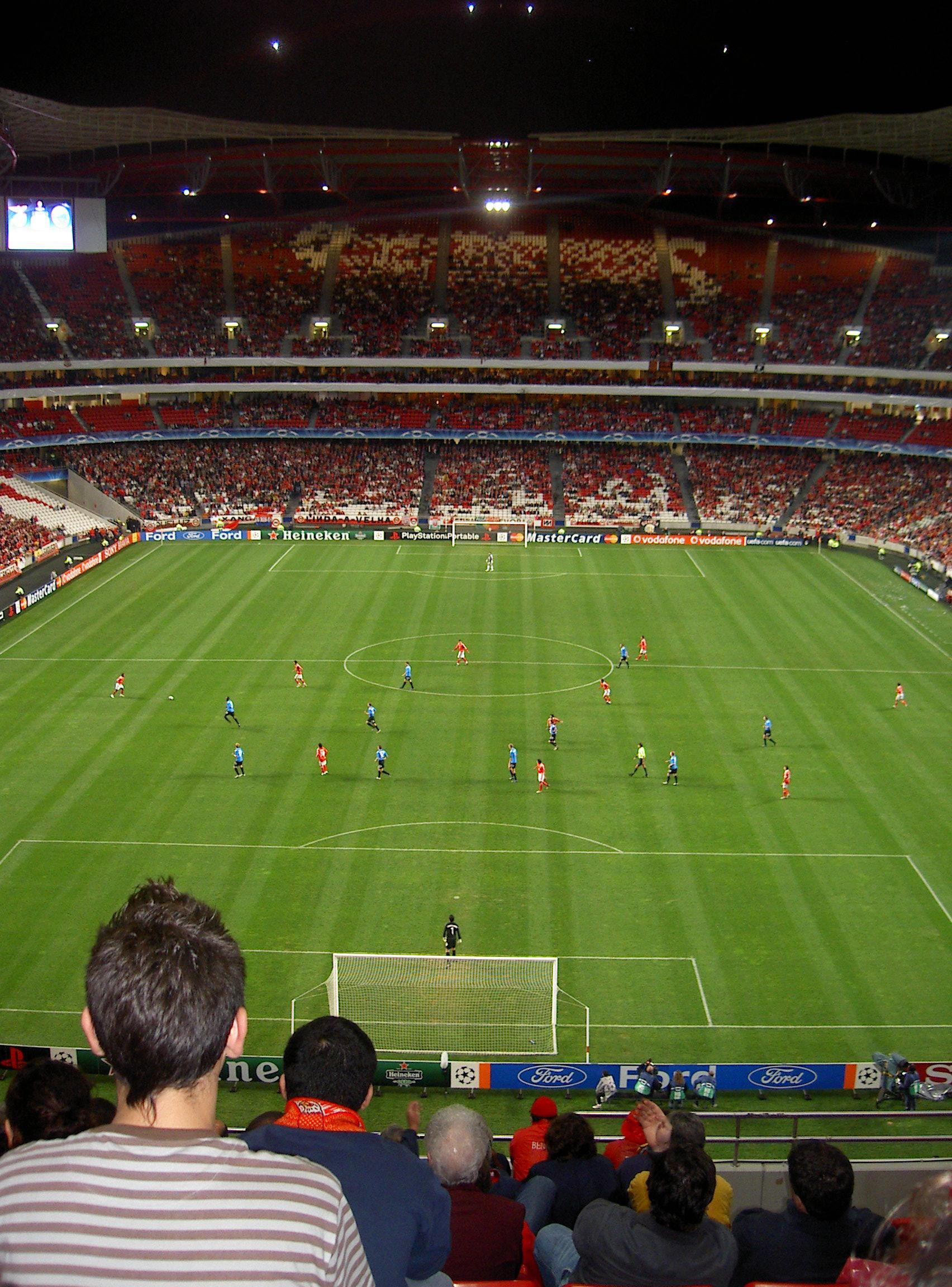
Benfica's reception to FC Copenhagen on 21 November 2006 had an attendance of 37,199.

October began with a home-match against Desportivo das Aves. Benfica scored first through Paulo Jorge, but Aves equalized with a goal by Filipe Anunciação. In the second half, Benfica scored three more goals from Simão, Nuno Gomes and Katsouranis to win the match. Nuno Gomes said, "I hope this win is a turning point for us." After another international break, Benfica played União de Leiria at the Dr. Magalhães Pessoa on 14 September. They continued with their good momentum and won 4–0, with Miccoli bagging a double. Santos was happy with his team's display, saying, "It was a great game and my team was focused, organized and dynamic, building a result that translated what happened on the pitch." On the next Tuesday, Benfica visited Celtic Park for the first of a double-header against Celtic. Benfica had the upper hand in the first half, but Celtic scored two second-half goals in a ten-minute window and finished the game with a third. The win gave Celtic with a five-point lead over Benfica with three matchdays to go. Santos blamed the loss on the team's lack of composure after conceding the first goal. He said he believed Benfica could still qualify for the next round.

On 22 October, Benfica hosted Estrela da Amadora. The visitors scored first though Dário, but Benfica equalized in the first half and scored two more goals in the second, winning the match 3–1. Santos was highly critical of the referee Carlos Xistra, who issued 18 yellow cards and three red cards, one of them to Miccoli, who would therefore miss the next match, a visit to Porto. Five days later, Benfica played Porto in the first Clássico of the season. In a high-tension match, Benfica conceded two goals in the first half but equalized in the second half, drawing the game in the 82nd minute. However, in injury time, Bruno Moraes scored, bringing the score to 3–2 to Porto. Santos said the result was unfair, adding, "After he got back into the game and managed to level it, 'that' happened in the end."

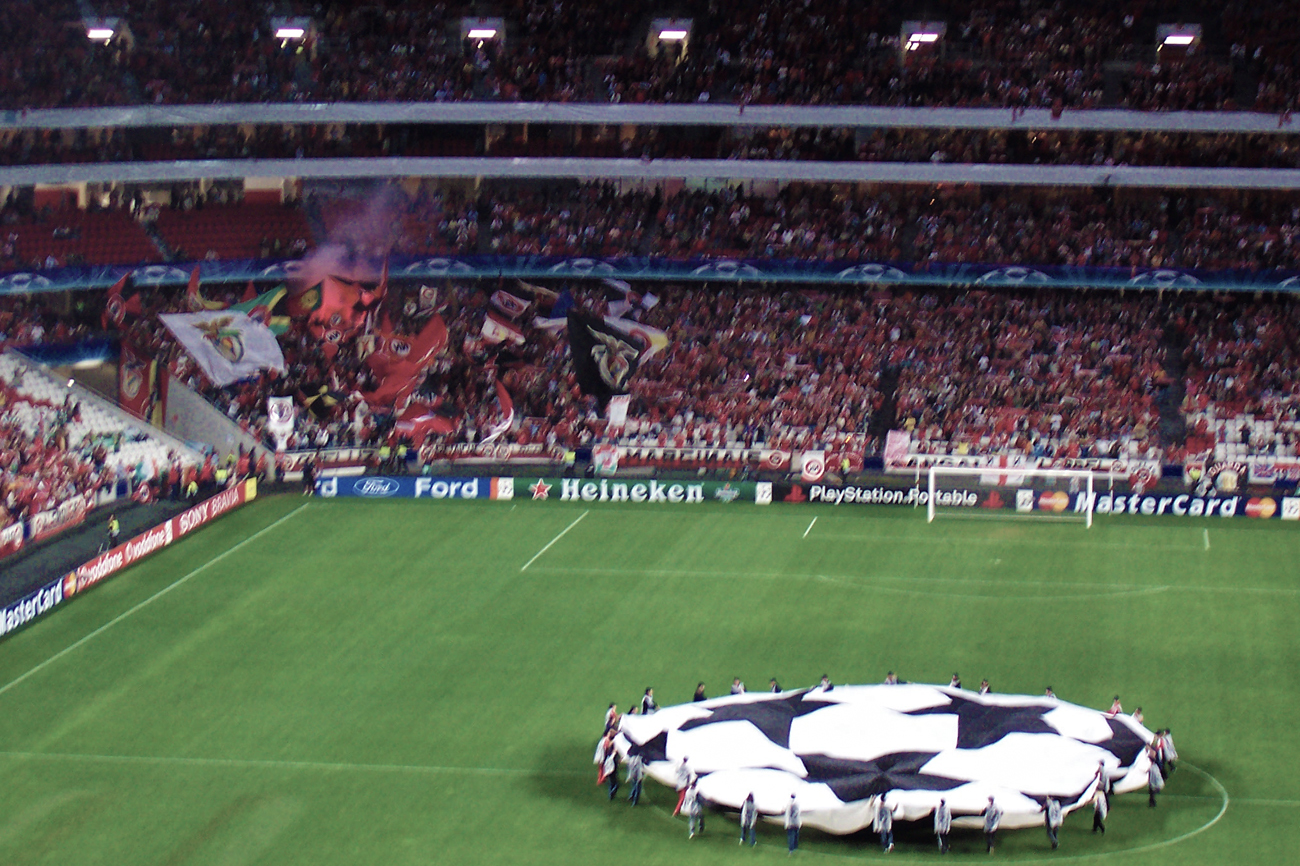
Benfica beat Celtic by 3–0 on 1 November 2006; here is the pre-match presentation with the giant UEFA Champions League logo.

On 1 November, Benfica hosted Celtic; they scored two goals in the first 25 minutes and a third through Andrei Karyaka in the 90th minute, winning by the same margin they had lost in Glasgow. Santos was happy with the win, saying, "We knew he had three 'finals' and now we have two. We are better now, with four points and closing in on Celtic." Four days later, Benfica hosted Beira-Mar for a Primeira Liga match. Benfica did not score until the second half, when in the 51st minute, Katsouranis headed in the match's first goal. Three minutes later, Petit scored the second and an own-goal from Beira-Mar made the score 3–0.

After the third international break, Benfica returned on 18 November with a match on the road against Braga. Quim had a particularly unfortunate game, making costly mistakes in two goals, and Benfica lost the match 3–1. Santos acknowledged his team's disappointing performance, saying, "We never controlled the game, despite having opportunities to even up. We had some reasonable moments but far away from our best." On the following Tuesday, Benfica played Copenhagen in Estádio da Luz for the fifth match-day of the group stage. Benfica scored three goals in the first half, two of them spaced by two minutes and winning the match 3–1. After news of Celtic's win against United, Benfica would only progress to the last 16 if they won at Old Trafford, which Santos believed to be possible. On the 25th, Benfica hosted Marítimo. Benfica scored first with an own-goal from Alex von Schwedler, but Marítimo levelled the score before half time through Marcinho. In the second half, Katsouranis scored the second Benfica goal, establishing the final result at 2–1 to Benfica. Santos criticized his players for "excessive individualism".

=== December–January ===
Benfica started December with the Lisbon derby against Sporting CP. The match was preponed by a day because of the European commitments of both clubs. Benfica started the game in the second minute with a goal from Ricardo Rocha; Simão increased it to 2–0 in the 35th minute, with Benfica holding onto the advantage until the end. Santos was pleased with his team's performance at Alvalade, saying, "Benfica could have scored three goals". On 6 December, Benfica visited Old Trafford for their decisive group stage match against Manchester United. They surprised United with an opening goal from Nélson near the half-hour, but conceded an equalizer from Nemanja Vidić just before half time. In the second half, United scored twice more and won the match. The loss, which led to Benfica's demotion to the UEFA Cup, frustrated Santos, who said, "The goal they scored at the end of the first half led to a lot of problems for us. We're disappointed, as we believed it would be possible to progress." On 10 December, Benfica played Naval on at Estádio Municipal José Bento Pessoa. The result was a goalless draw and Benfica loast two points in the title race. Simão recognized Benfica were now dependent on others to win the league.

Five days later, Benfica was paired with Dinamo București in the draw in Nyon. The next day, they received Vitória de Setúbal at home. After an opening goal in the first half, Benfica added two more in the second for a 3–0 win. Santos complemented his team, predicting they could have added three or four more goals. On 21 December, Benfica played the match against Belenenses that was postponed from August. Benfica scored the first goal through a penalty from Simão; Giorgos Karagounis scored a second after converting a free-kick. In the second half, Benfica added two more goals for a 4–0 win. Santos said "a 4–2 would more adequate for what happened on the pitch".

In January, the Taça de Portugal started for Benfica; they entered in the fourth round and played with Oliveira do Bairro from the third tier. As Rui Costa recovered from various injuries, Santos implemented a diamond formation with Costa supporting two strikers. Benfica put five goals past Oliveira do Bairro and advanced to the fifth round. Santos attributed the win to his players' attitude in the presence of an inferior opponent. Benfica's next match on 15 January was a visit to Estádio Cidade de Coimbra. Ricardo Rocha scored the opening goal for Benfica in the second minute and Léo scored the second in the 89th minute, ending the match 0–0 to Benfica. Santos called the match a great spectacle played at high-speed and where the win could have fallen for either side.

As the month progressed, Benfica made some squad adjustments, selling Francisco Fonseca back to Mexico and replacing him with Derlei on a loan from Dynamo Moscow. They then sold Ricardo Rocha to Tottenham Hotspur, and signed David Luiz, also on a loan deal, as his replacement. On 21 January, Benfica played the fifth round of the Portuguese Cup against União de Leiria. Harison scored first for Leiria, but Benfica countered with an equalizer from Nuno Gomes in the 80th minute and a winning goal from Mantorras five minutes later. Rui Costa was happy with the comeback because Benfica remained in all three fronts. Benfica's last match of January was a visit to Restelo to play Belenenses. Costa assisted Simão for the opening goal and before half time assisted Luisão for the second, with Benfica winning 2–1.

=== February–March ===
On 2 February, Benfica played host to Boavista. They had several opportunities to beat William, but Boavista prevented them all. The match ended in a goalless draw, leaving Benfica one point away from the Estádio da Luz. Santos accepted the draw, saying, "I do not like to speak about luck or misfortune. The ball just would not go in. That is it." Eight days later, Benfica travelled to Estádio do Varzim to play the sixth round of the Portuguese Cup against Segunda Liga-side Varzim. The hosts opened the score with an own goal from Nélson in the 13th minute, but Benfica equalizer with a goal from Simão at the half-hour mark. In the second half, Varzim pressed again and António Mendonça scored a match-winning 77th-minute goal. Benfica's elimination at the hands of Varzim was the third time in Santos' career he was knocked-out of the Portuguese Cup by a team from lower divisions, the other clubs being Porto and Sporting.

On 14 February, Benfica began their 2006–07 UEFA Cup campaign with a home game against Dinamo București. They struggled to convert goal chances, having hit the goalposts twice in the second half. Miccoli finally broke Dinamo's defence with a 90th-minute goal. Four days later, the Italian led Benfica to a win in Choupana against Nacional, allowing Benfica to overtake Sporting and reach second place in the Primeira Liga, four points behind Porto. On 22 February, Benfica visited the Stadionul Dinamo for the second leg with Dinamo, beating them 2–1 to reach to the round of 16. Benfica played their last match of the month against Paços de Ferreira on 25 February. They won the match by 3–1 against the Paços de Ferreira-based side due to double from Simão and another from Nuno Gomes. The win opened a three-point gap over Sporting, but Santos said, "That is not what matters. It is our three points. We have 4 points deficit from Porto and we will try to get closer."

With Benfica committed to the league race, March was a critical month for the club's aspirations. Their first game was a visit to Aves to play Desportivo de Aves. The home team had an opportunity to lead with a penalty kick in the 36th minute, but Quim stopped Hernâni Borges's shot. In the second half, Nuno Gomes scored the match's only goal when he answered a cross from Nélson. Santos said the result was better than the performance. On the next Thursday, Benfica played Paris St-Germain at the Parc des Princes. Benfica scored first with header from Simão in the tenth minute, but PSG reacted with two goals in five minutes before half-time. The score remained unchanged, giving Benfica a one-goal disadvantage. On 12 March, Benfica met União de Leiria at home for match-day 21. Benfica won 2–0 with goals from Simão and Petit, keeping up the pressure on Porto.

Three days after Leiria, Benfica received PSG for the second leg. Benfica scored their first goal in the 12th minute and another before half-time. However, the Parisians got back into the game with a goal from Pauleta. Throughout the second half, Benfica threatened Mickaël Landreau's goalposts, finally scoring near the 90th minute when Simão converted a penalty resulting from a foul on Léo. Simão told the media, "We knew we were stronger and had to take advantage of their mistakes. That is what he did." In the quarter-finals, Benfica were due to play Spanish side Espanyol, first in Barcelona and then in Lisbon. Domestically, Benfica played Estrela da Amadora on 19 March. Because Sporting had beat Porto in the match between them, Benfica could close up their distance from the top of the table to one point if they won. At the Estádio da Reboleira, Benfica defeated Estrela 1–0 with a goal from Petit in the 81st minute. The win left Benfica with 51 points, one fewer than Porto. The Clássico was the next match; Santos lowered fans' expectations by saying the league race was open for all of the Big Three and that there were still eight match-days to go before the season's end.

=== April–May ===
Benfica ended March with their objectives intact, so April became a crucial month. After a ten-day international break, Benfica resumed competition with the Clássico at home against Porto on 1 April. The visitors scored first through Pepe in the 41st minute, but Benfica equalized in the 83rd minute with an own-goal from Lucho González. Santos attributed the draw to Porto goalkeeper Helton's performance, saying, "Helton made three or four great saves. We were better in the second half and we deserved to win." On the following Thursday, Benfica visited the Olímpic de Montjuïc to face Espanyol. The Spaniards pushed hard from early on and scored first through Raúl Tamudo in the 15th minute; shortly after the half-hour mark, Albert Riera made it 2–0 and in the second half, Walter Pandiani added a third goal. Benfica reacted; Nuno Gomes scored to make the score 3–1 in the 63rd minute. Two minutes later, Simão scored Benfica's second goal and the match ended in a 3–2 loss. Santos blamed the poor first half for the loss, saying, "Like with Porto, we were lost in the first half, and let our opponent play." On 9 April, Benfica played Beira-Mar at the Estádio Municipal de Aveiro. Beira-Mar surprised Benfica and imposed on them a 2–2 draw in a match that Santos had labelled "title deciding". Santos accepted the result and commented, "We have to think in Thursday match, because our game today was bad. Beira-Mar had a lot of merit. The title is now harder but we will not renounce it." On 12 April, Benfica received Espanyol for the second leg of the quarter-finals. A slow first half contrasted with a high-pressure second, in which the woodwork and Gorka Iraizoz helped Espanyol defend the goalless draw, allowing Espanyol to proceed to the semi-finals.

Four days later, Benfica hosted Braga, who were searching for their first win of April. Benfica enjoyed a slight superiority throughout the match but could not surpass Braga's defence. Paulo Santos ended the game unbeaten. The third consecutive draw had negative consequences for the league race; Porto increased their lead to five points and Sporting climbed to second place in exchange for Benfica after recovering five points in the past three matchdays. Santos accepted the title was no longer an objective, saying, "We are not mathematically removed from it, but we are clearly very far from winning it ... Now we have to fight for second place, because it is crucial." On 21 April, Benfica travelled to Funchal to play Marítimo. Miccoli was essential in Benfica's game, scoring the first two goals in a 3–0 win, the first in April for Benfica. For their last match of April, Benfica received Sporting at home. Without Simão, who was injured, Benfica suffered an early setback when Liédson scored for Sporting in the second minute. Benfica equalized with a goal from Miccoli 20 minutes later, ending the game 1–1. Santos blamed bad luck for the draw.

In May, Benfica were chasing second place; they met Naval on 5 May. As with Marítimo, Miccoli was vital in securing the win, helping Petit score the first and then scoring the winner with two minutes to spare. Santos was satisfied, but said Benfica needed to do better, complaining of excessive individualism from his players. On 13 May, Benfica visited Estádio do Bonfim to play Vitória de Setúbal. They struggled to beat Setúbal goalkeeper Nikola Milojević until Miccoli broke the deadlock in the 79th minute. Santos commented on Benfica's chances in winning the Primeira Liga, saying, "While [it] is mathematically possible, I will believe in it." Miccoli, who scored his fifth goal in four matches, told the media he about his future, "I would like to stay. Love the club, love the team and the fans. Benfica is everything to me." A week later, on the final day of the league, Benfica received and beat Académica 2–0, with goals from Derlei and Mantorras. Because both rivals had won, Benfica finished in third place with 67 points, two behind winners Porto and one behind Sporting, missing out on direct entry to the 2007–08 UEFA Champions League. Despite the trophy-less season, Santos refused to label the season negative, saying, "Not winning titles is never good, but calling this season negative is a step I will not take." Benfica ended the season with tour of North America, playing Toronto FC and AEK Athens. During the tour, Santos predicted he would win the title in the next season, while Benfica President Luís Filipe Vieira said Benfica would invest heavily to make the team more competitive.

== Competitions ==
Win Draw Loss Postponed

=== Overall record ===
Competition	First match	Last match	Record								
Competition	First match	Last match	G	W	D	L	GF	GA	GD	Win %	Source
Primeira Liga	9 September 2006	20 May 2007	30	20	7	3	55	20	+35	66.67	
Taça de Portugal	6 January 2007	10 February 2007	3	2	0	1	8	3	+5	66.67	
UEFA Champions League	8 August 2006	6 December 2006	8	3	2	3	11	9	+2	37.50	
UEFA Cup	14 February 2007	12 April 2007	6	3	1	2	9	7	+2	50.00	
Total			47	28	10	9	83	29	+54	59.57	

=== Primeira Liga ===
==== League table ====
Pos	Team	Pld	W	D	L	GF	GA	GD	Pts	Qualification or relegation
1	Porto (C)	30	22	3	5	65	20	+45	69	Qualification to Champions League group stage
2	Sporting CP	30	20	8	2	54	15	+39	68	Qualification to Champions League group stage
3	Benfica	30	20	7	3	55	20	+35	67	Qualification to Champions League third qualifying round
4	Braga	30	14	8	8	35	30	+5	50	Qualification to UEFA Cup first round
5	Belenenses	30	15	4	11	36	29	+7	49	Qualification to UEFA Cup first round

Source: rsssf.com
Rules for classification: 1) points; 2) head-to-head points; 3) head-to-head goal difference; 4) goal difference; 5) number of goals scored
(C) Champions

==== Results by round ====
Round	1	2	3	4	5	6	7	8	9	10	11	12	13	14	15	16	17	18	19	20	21	22	23	24	25	26	27	28	29	30
Ground	H	A	H	A	H	A	H	A	H	A	H	A	A	H	A	A	H	A	H	A	H	A	H	A	H	A	H	H	A	H
Result	W	L	W	D	W	W	W	L	W	L	W	W	D	W	W	W	D	W	W	W	W	W	D	D	D	W	D	W	W	W
Position	1	6	2	3	3	3	1	3	3	3	3	3	3	3	3	2	3	2	2	2	2	2	2	2	3	3	3	3	3	3

Source: ForaDeJogo.net
A = Away; H = Home; W = Win; D = Draw; L = Loss

==== Matches ====
27 August 2007 1	Benfica	Postponed	Belenenses	Lisbon
19:30		(Note: Postponed on 24 August due to the Mateus Affair)		Stadium: Estádio da Luz

9 September 2006 2	Boavista	3–0	Benfica	Porto
21:15	Linz 36', 75'; Kaźmierczak 89'	Report	Nuno Gomes (yellow card) 40' (yellow-red card) 68'; Manú (red card) 91'; Petit (yellow card) 69' (yellow-red card) 91'	Stadium: Estádio do Bessa; Attendance: 8,000; Referee: João Ferreira

17 September 2006 3	Benfica	1–0	Nacional	Lisbon
19:15	Luisão 29'	Report	Cléber (yellow card) 28' (yellow-red card) 58'	Stadium: Estádio da Luz; Attendance: 36,590; Referee: Pedro Henriques

22 September 2006 4	Paços de Ferreira	1–1	Benfica	Paços de Ferreira
21:30	João Paulo 90+1'; Luiz Carlos (yellow card) 61' (yellow-red card) 76'	Report	Katsouranis 23'; Léo (yellow card) 54' (yellow-red card) 54'	Stadium: Estádio da Mata Real; Attendance: 3,000; Referee: Lucílio Baptista

1 October 2006 5	Benfica	4–1	Desportivo das Aves	Lisbon
19:45	Paulo Jorge 19'; Nuno Gomes 50'; Simão 64' (pen.); Katsouranis 90'	Report	Anunciação 27'	Stadium: Estádio da Luz; Attendance: 32,000; Referee: Paulo Pereira

14 October 2006 6	União de Leiria	0–4	Benfica	Leiria
21:15		Report	Miccoli 30', 43'; Nuno Gomes 62'; Simão 66' (pen.)	Stadium: Estádio Dr. Magalhães Pessoa; Attendance: 11,433; Referee: Paulo Baptista

22 October 2006 7	Benfica	3–1	Estrela da Amadora	Lisbon
19:15	Miccoli 32' (yellow card) 68' (yellow-red card) 82'; Simão 54' (pen.); Karyaka 89'	Report	Dário 13'; Pedro Simões (yellow card) 11' (yellow-red card) 53'; Duarte (yellow card) 82' (yellow-red card) 86'	Stadium: Estádio da Luz; Attendance: 26,084; Referee: Carlos Xistra

28 October 2006 8	Porto	3–2	Benfica	Porto
19:45	López 12'; Quaresma 20'; Moraes 90+1'	Report	Katsouranis 62'; Nuno Gomes 82'	Stadium: Estádio do Dragão; Attendance: 50,222; Referee: Lucílio Baptista

5 November 2006 9	Benfica	3–0	Beira-Mar	Lisbon
20:45	Katsouranis 51'; Petit 54'; Ricardo 74' (o.g.)	Report	Buba (yellow card) 34' (yellow-red card) 73'	Stadium: Estádio da Luz; Attendance: 37,069; Referee: Jorge Sousa

18 November 2006 10	Braga	3–1	Benfica	Braga
20:30	Zé Carlos 7'; Maciel 41'; Paulo Jorge 81'	Report	Rocha 31'	Stadium: Estádio Municipal de Braga; Attendance: 22,440; Referee: Olegário Benquerença

25 November 2006 11	Benfica	2–1	Marítimo	Lisbon
17:00	Von Schwedler 32' (o.g.); Katsouranis 66'	Report	Marcinho 41' (red card) 52'	Stadium: Estádio da Luz; Attendance: 34,377; Referee: João Ferreira

1 December 2006 12	Sporting	0–2	Benfica	Lisbon
20:45	Polga (yellow card) 41' (yellow-red card) 81'	Report	Rocha 2'; Simão 35'; Nuno Gomes (red card) 82'	Stadium: Estádio de Alvalade; Attendance: 44,042; Referee: Jorge Sousa

10 December 2006 13	Naval	0–0	Benfica	Figueira da Foz
21:15		Report		Stadium: Estádio Municipal José Bento Pessoa; Attendance: 5,000; Referee: Paulo Paraty

16 December 2006 14	Benfica	3–0	Vitória de Setúbal	Lisbon
20:15	Nuno Gomes 13'; Simão 63'; Assis 86'	Report		Stadium: Estádio da Luz; Attendance: 30,761; Referee: Elmano Santos

21 December 2006 1	Benfica	4–0	Belenenses	Lisbon
20:30	Simão 20' (pen.); Karagounis 43'; Fonseca 53'; Katsouranis 79'	Report		Stadium: Estádio da Luz; Attendance: 42,306; Referee: Bruno Paixão

15 January 2007 15	Académica	0–2	Benfica	Coimbra
19:45		Report	Rocha 2'; Léo 88'	Stadium: Estádio Cidade de Coimbra; Attendance: 19,464; Referee: Paulo Pereira

27 January 2007 16	Belenenses	1–2	Benfica	Lisbon
19:00	Silas 86'; José Pedro (yellow card) 90' (yellow-red card) 90+5'	Report	Simão 13'; Luisão 36'	Stadium: Estádio do Restelo; Attendance: 8,000; Referee: Pedro Proença

2 February 2007 17	Benfica	0–0	Boavista	Lisbon
20:45		Report		Stadium: Estádio da Luz; Attendance: 50,222; Referee: Pedro Henriques

18 February 2007 18	Nacional	0–2	Benfica	Funchal
18:15		Report	Miccoli 61', 71'	Stadium: Estádio da Madeira; Attendance: 3,000; Referee: Bruno Paixão

25 February 2007 19	Benfica	3–1	Paços de Ferreira	Lisbon
19:00	Simão 8', 65'; Nuno Gomes 33'	Report	Fahel 45'	Stadium: Estádio da Luz; Attendance: 35,114; Referee: Paulo Paraty

3 March 2007 20	Desportivo das Aves	0–1	Benfica	Vila das Aves
21:15		Report	Nuno Gomes 59'	Stadium: Estádio do CD das Aves; Attendance: 7,000; Referee: Jorge Sousa

12 March 2007 21	Benfica	2–0	União de Leiria	Lisbon
19:15	Simão 16'; Petit 85'	Report		Stadium: Estádio da Luz; Attendance: 34,932; Referee: Paulo Pereira

19 March 2007 22	Estrela da Amadora	0–1	Benfica	Lisbon
20:30		Report	Petit 81'	Stadium: Estádio José Gomes; Attendance: 7,650; Referee: João Vilas Boas

1 April 2007 23	Benfica	1–1	Porto	Lisbon
21:15	González 83' (o.g.)	Report	Pepe 41'	Stadium: Estádio da Luz; Attendance: 62,756; Referee: Pedro Proença

9 April 2007 24	Beira-Mar	2–2	Benfica	Aveiro, Portugal
20:15	Luciano Ratinho 23'; Delibašić 86'	Report	Mantorras 83'; Simão 90+3' (pen.)	Stadium: Estádio Municipal de Aveiro; Attendance: 29,427; Referee: Lucilio Baptista

16 April 2007 25	Benfica	0–0	Braga	Lisbon
19:45		Report		Stadium: Estádio da Luz; Attendance: 36,259; Referee: João Ferreira

21 April 2007 26	Marítimo	0–3	Benfica	Funchal
20:15		Report	Miccoli 54', 78'; Katsouranis 90+6' (pen.)	Stadium: Estádio dos Barreiros; Attendance: 10,000; Referee: Paulo Baptista

29 April 2007 27	Benfica	1–1	Sporting CP	Lisbon
20:45	Miccoli 23'	Report	Liédson 2'	Stadium: Estádio da Luz; Attendance: 54,370; Referee: Pedro Henriques

5 May 2007 28	Benfica	2–1	Naval	Lisbon
16:00	Petit 12'; Miccoli 89'	Report	Lito 77'	Stadium: Estádio da Luz; Attendance: 29,240; Referee: João Vilas Boas

13 May 2007 29	Vitória de Setúbal	0–1	Benfica	Setúbal
17:30		Report	Miccoli 79'	Stadium: Estádio do Bonfim; Attendance: 6,862; Referee: Jorge Sousa

20 May 2007 30	Benfica	2–0	Académica	Lisbon
17:00	Derlei 11'; Mantorras 82'	Report		Stadium: Estádio da Luz; Attendance: 42,994; Referee: João Ferreira

=== Taça de Portugal ===
6 January 2007 Fourth Rd	Benfica	5–0	Oliveira do Bairro	Lisbon
16:00	Katsouranis 4'; Nuno Gomes 38', 40'; Fonseca 54', 60'	Report		Stadium: Estádio da Luz; Attendance: 34,000; Referee: Nuno Almeida

21 January 2007 Fifth Rd	Benfica	2–1	União de Leiria	Lisbon
19:15	Nuno Gomes 79'; Mantorras 85'	Report	Harison 58' (red card) 87'	Stadium: Estádio da Luz; Attendance: 22,227; Referee: Lucilio Baptista

10 February 2007 Sixth Rd	Varzim	2–1	Benfica	Póvoa de Varzim
20:30	Nélson 13' (o.g.); Mendonça 77'	Report	Simão 30'	Stadium: Estádio do Varzim Sport Club

=== UEFA Champions League ===
==== Third qualifying round ====
8 August 2006 First leg	Austria Wien	1–1	(Portugal) Benfica	Vienna
19:45	Blanchard 36'	Report	Nuno Gomes 16'	Stadium: Ernst-Happel-Stadion; Attendance: 19,600; Referee: Stefano Farina (Italy)

22 August 2006 Second leg	Benfica (Portugal)	3–0 (4–1 agg.)	Austria Wien	Lisbon
19:45	Rui Costa 21'; Nuno Gomes 45+3'; Petit 57'	Report		Stadium: Estádio da Luz; Attendance: 58,110; Referee: Terje Hauge (Norway)

==== Group F ====
Pos	Team	Pld	W	D	L	GF	GA	GD	Pts	Qualification
1	(England) Manchester United	6	4	0	2	10	5	+5	12	Advance to knockout stage
2	(Scotland) Celtic	6	3	0	3	8	9	−1	9	Advance to knockout stage
3	(Portugal) Benfica	6	2	1	3	7	8	−1	7	Transfer to UEFA Cup
4	(Denmark) Copenhagen	6	2	1	3	5	8	−3	7	

Source: RSSSF

13 September 2006 1	Copenhagen (Denmark)	0–0	(Portugal) Benfica	Copenhagen
19:45		Report		Stadium: Parken Stadium; Attendance: 40,085; Referee: Yuri Baskakov (Russia)

26 September 2006 2	Benfica (Portugal)	0–1	(England) Manchester United	Lisbon
19:45		Report	Saha 60'	Stadium: Estádio da Luz; Attendance: 61,000; Referee: Frank De Bleeckere (Belgium)

17 October 2006 3	Celtic (Scotland)	3–0	(Portugal) Benfica	Glasgow
19:45	Miller 56', 66'; Pearson 90'	Report		Stadium: Celtic Park; Attendance: 58,313; Referee: Eric Braamhaar (Netherlands)

1 November 2006 4	Benfica (Portugal)	3–0	(Scotland) Celtic	Lisbon
19:45	Caldwell 10' (o.g.); Nuno Gomes 22'; Karyaka 76'	Report		Stadium: Estádio da Luz; Attendance: 40,000; Referee: Kyros Vassaras (Greece)

21 November 2006 5	Benfica (Portugal)	3–1	(Denmark) Copenhagen	Lisbon
19:45	Léo 14'; Miccoli 16', 37'	Report	Allbäck 89'	Stadium: Estádio da Luz; Attendance: 37,199; Referee: Roberto Rosetti (Italy)

6 December 2006 6	Manchester United (England)	3–1	(Portugal) Benfica	Manchester
19:45	Vidić 45+1'; Giggs 61'; Saha 75'	Report	Nélson 27'	Stadium: Old Trafford; Attendance: 74,955; Referee: Herbert Fandel (Germany)

=== UEFA Cup ===
==== Round of 32 ====
14 February 2007 First leg	Benfica (Portugal)	1–0	(Romania) Dinamo București	Lisbon
21:00	Miccoli 90'	Report		Stadium: Estádio da Luz; Attendance: 35,000; Referee: Ivan Bebek (Croatia)

22 February 2007 Second leg	Dinamo București (Romania)	1–2 (1–3 agg.)	(Portugal) Benfica	Bucharest
19:45	Munteanu 24'	Report	Anderson 50'; Katsouranis 64'	Stadium: Dinamo Stadium; Attendance: 15,000; Referee: Nicolai Vollquartz (Denmark)

==== Round of 16 ====
8 March 2007 First leg	Paris Saint-Germain (France)	2–1	(Portugal) Benfica	Paris
20:45	Pauleta 36'; Frau 41'	Report	Simão 9'	Stadium: Parc des Princes; Attendance: 43,000; Referee: Graham Poll (England)

15 March 2007 Second leg	Benfica (Portugal)	3–1 (4–3 agg.)	(France) Paris Saint-Germain	Lisbon
21:00	Simão 12', 88' (pen.); Petit 27'	Report	Pauleta 32'	Stadium: Estádio da Luz; Attendance: 58,800; Referee: Florian Meyer (Germany)

==== Quarter-finals ====
5 April 2007 First leg	Espanyol (Spain)	3–2	(Portugal) Benfica	Barcelona
20:45	Tamudo 15'; Riera 33'; Pandiani 59'	Report	Nuno Gomes 64'; Simão 66'	Stadium: Olímpic de Montjuïc; Attendance: 35,000; Referee: Eric Braamhaar (Netherlands)

12 April 2007 Second leg	Benfica (Portugal)	0–0 (2–3 agg.)	(Spain) Espanyol	Lisbon
20:45		Report		Stadium: Estádio da Luz; Attendance: 55,000; Referee: Claus Bo Larsen (Denmark)

=== Friendlies ===
8 July 2006	Stade Nyonnais	0–3	Benfica	Nyon, Switzerland
17:15 CET (UTC+01)			Marcel 10', 31'; Canales 80'	Stadium: Centre sportif de Colovray Nyon

12 July 2006	Benfica	2–0	Shakhtar Donetsk	Yverdon-les-Bains, Switzerland
19:30 CET (UTC+01)	Katsouranis 18' (pen.); Karagounis 29'			Stadium: Stade Municipal (Yverdon)

15 July 2006	Sion	3–2	Benfica	Sion, Switzerland
17:15 CET (UTC+01)	Pinto 4'; Obradović 40'; Reset 82'		Mantorras 44'; Rui Costa 83'	Stadium: Stade Tourbillon

22 July 2006	Benfica	2–0	Bordeaux	Lisbon, Portugal
19:30 CET (UTC+01)	Miccoli 15'; Marcel 67'			Stadium: Estádio da Luz

27 July 2006 Guadiana Trophy	Sporting CP	3–0	Benfica	Vila Real de Santo António, Portugal
19:30 CET (UTC+01)	Djaló 39', 51'; Katsouranis 62' (o.g.)			Stadium: Complexo Desportivo de Vila Real de Santo

28 July 2006 Guadiana Trophy	Deportivo La Coruña	1–0	Benfica	Vila Real de Santo António, Portugal
21:15 CET (UTC+01)	Sergio 16'			Stadium: Complexo Desportivo de Vila Real de Santo

1 August 2006	AEK Athens	3–1	Benfica	Athens, Greece
19:30 CET (UTC+01)	Kapetanos 18', 39'; Liberopoulos 22'		Paulo Jorge 45'	Stadium: Olympic Stadium (Athens); Referee: Giorgos Kasnaferis (Greece)

15 August 2006	Estrela da Amadora	1–2	Benfica	Lisbon, Portugal
19:30 CET (UTC+01)	Cleiton 20'		Fonseca 38'; Mantorras 63'	Stadium: Estádio da Reboleira

8 January 2007 Dubai Cup Semis	Benfica	0–0 (4–3 p)	Bayern Munich	Dubai, United Arab Emirates
19:30 CET (UTC+01)		Report		Stadium: Al-Rashid Stadium; Referee: Khalid Al Dokhi
	Penalties
	Beto (penalty missed); Luisão (penalty scored); Mantorras (penalty scored); Karagounis (penalty scored); Ferreira (penalty scored)		(penalty missed) Van Bommel; (penalty missed) Pizarro; (penalty scored) Salihamidžić; (penalty scored) Lúcio; (penalty scored) Podolski

10 January 2007 Dubai Cup final	Benfica	0–0 (5–4 p)	Lazio	Dubai, United Arab Emirates
19:30 CET (UTC+01)		Report		Stadium: Al-Rashid Stadium; Referee: Mohamed de Juwheioy
	Penalties
	Luisão (penalty scored); Mantorras (penalty missed); Katsouranis (penalty scored); Paulo Jorge (penalty scored); Ferreira (penalty scored); Léo (penalty missed); Correia (penalty scored)		(penalty scored) Foggia; (penalty missed) Tare; (penalty scored) Cribari; (penalty scored) Manfredini; (penalty scored) Ledesma; (penalty missed) Bonetto; (penalty missed) Ballotta

24 May 2007	Toronto FC	0–0	Benfica	Toronto, Ontario, Canada
19:30 Newfoundland Time Zone (UTC-03)		Report		Stadium: BMO Field; Referee: Silviu Petrescu

27 May 2007	Benfica	2–1	AEK Athens	New Jersey, United States
14:15 CET (UTC+01)	Bourbos 34' (o.g.); Rui Costa 74'	Report	Manduca 6'	Stadium: Giants Stadium; Referee: Kevin Stott

== Player statistics ==
The squad for the season consisted of the players listed in the tables below, as well as staff member Fernando Santos (manager), Jorge Rosário (assistant manager), Fernando Chalana, (assistant manager), Bruno Moura (physiotherapist), Ricardo Santos (scout).

Note 1: Note: Flags indicate national team as defined under FIFA eligibility rules. Players may hold more than one non-FIFA nationality.

Note 2: Players with squad numbers marked ‡ joined the club during the 2006–07 season via transfer, with more details in the following section.

No.	Pos	Nat	Player	Total		Primeira Liga		Taça de Portugal		Champions League		UEFA Cup	
No.	Pos	Nat	Player	Apps	Goals	Apps	Goals	Apps	Goals	Apps	Goals	Apps	Goals
1	GK	(Portugal) POR	José Moreira	1	0	1	0	0	0	0	0	0	0
2	DF	(Portugal) POR	Pedro Correia	0	0	0	0	0	0	0	0	0	0
3	DF	(Brazil) BRA	Anderson	32	1	19	0	3	0	4	0	6	1
4	DF	(Brazil) BRA	Luisão	29	2	17	2	2	0	7	0	3	0
5	DF	(Brazil) BRA	Léo	42	2	27	1	3	0	6	1	6	0
6	MF	(Portugal) POR	Petit	40	6	24	4	2	0	8	1	6	1
7	MF	(Portugal) POR	Marco Ferreira	2	0	1	0	0	0	1	0	0	0
8^{‡}	MF	(Greece) GRE	Kostas Katsouranis	44	7	29	5	3	1	8	0	4	1
9	FW	(Angola) ANG	Pedro Mantorras	25	3	17	2	3	1	4	0	1	0
10^{‡}	MF	(Portugal) POR	Rui Costa	22	5	14	4	3	0	2	1	3	0
11^{‡}	DF	(Portugal) POR	Miguelito	7	0	7	0	0	0	0	0	0	0
12	GK	(Portugal) POR	Quim	45	-38	29	-20	3	-3	8	-9	5	-6
13	DF	(Brazil) BRA	Alcides	5	0	2	0	0	0	3	0	0	0
15^{‡}	MF	(Portugal) POR	Paulo Jorge	21	1	14	1	0	0	5	0	2	0
16	MF	(Brazil) BRA	Beto	11	0	6	0	1	0	2	0	2	0
17^{‡}	FW	(Mexico) MEX	Francisco Fonseca	13	3	8	1	1	2	4	0	0	0
18^{‡}	MF	(Portugal) POR	Manú	16	0	11	0	2	0	3	0	0	0
19	MF	(Russia) RUS	Andrei Karyaka	5	2	2	1	1	0	2	1	0	0
20	MF	(Portugal) POR	Simão	39	16	24	11	3	1	6	0	6	4
21	FW	(Portugal) POR	Nuno Gomes	41	13	24	6	3	3	8	3	6	1
22	DF	(Portugal) POR	Nélson	43	1	28	0	3	0	6	1	6	0
23^{‡}	DF	(Brazil) BRA	David Luiz	14	0	10	0	0	0	0	0	4	0
25	MF	(Portugal) POR	Nuno Assis	21	1	14	1	0	0	7	0	0	0
26	MF	(Greece) GRE	Giorgos Karagounis	37	3	26	3	2	0	3	0	6	0
27^{‡}	FW	(Brazil) BRA	Derlei	18	1	12	1	0	0	0	0	6	0
28	MF	(Portugal) POR	João Coimbra	17	0	12	0	1	0	0	0	4	0
30	FW	(Italy) ITA	Fabrizio Miccoli	33	13	22	10	0	0	5	2	6	1
31	GK	(Brazil) BRA	Moretto	2	-1	1	0	0	0	0	0	1	-1
33	DF	(Portugal) POR	Ricardo Rocha	20	3	12	3	1	0	7	0	0	0
34	MF	(Brazil) BRA	Diego Souza	0	0	0	0	0	0	0	0	0	0

== Transfers ==
=== In ===
Entry date	Position	Player	From club	Fee	Ref
5 May 2006	ST	Marcel	Académica de Coimbra	Undisclosed	
25 May 2006	AM	Rui Costa	Milan	Free	
8 June 2006	LW	Manú	Estrela da Amadora	Loan return	
22 June 2006	DM	Kostas Katsouranis	AEK Athens	Undisclosed	
3 July 2006	AM	Diego de Souza	Flamengo	Loan return	
5 July 2006	RW	Paulo Jorge	Boavista	Undisclosed	
27 July 2006	FW	Francisco Fonseca	Cruz Azul	Undisclosed	
23 August 2006	LB	Miguelito	Nacional	Undisclosed	

=== In by loan ===
Entry date	Position	Player	From club	Exit date	Ref
11 July 2006	ST	Fabrizio Miccoli	Juventus	30 June 2007	
29 January 2007	ST	Derlei	Dynamo Moscow	30 June 2007	
31 January 2007	CB	David Luiz	Vitória	30 June 2007	

=== Out ===
Entry date	Position	Player	From club	Fee	Ref
6 June 2006	RW	Geovanni	Cruzeiro	Free	
6 July 2006	RB	João Pereira	Gil Vicente	Free	
11 July 2006	LW	Laurent Robert	Levante	Free	
14 August 2006	GK	Yannick Quesnel	Monaco	Free	
3 September 2006	CB	André Luís	Cruzeiro	Undisclosed	
10 January 2007	CB	Alcides	Chelsea	Loan terminated	
15 January 2007	FW	Kikin Fonseca	Tigres	Undisclosed	
22 January 2007	CB	Ricardo Rocha	Tottenham Hotspur	Undisclosed	

=== Out by loan ===
Entry date	Position	Player	From club	Return date	Ref
23 June 2006	RW/LW	Carlitos	Sion	30 June 2007	
3 August 2006	LW	Gustavo Manduca	AEK Athens	30 June 2007	
3 August 2006	LW	Hélio Roque	Olivais e Moscavide	30 June 2007	
20 August 2006	LW	José Fonte	Estrela da Amadora	30 June 2007	
23 August 2006	LB	Tiago Gomes	Estrela da Amadora	30 June 2007	
23 August 2006	CB	Eurípedes Amoreirinha	Estrela da Amadora	30 June 2007	
23 August 2006	ST	Azar Karadas	1. FC Kaiserslautern	30 June 2007	
24 August 2006	ST	Marcel	Braga	30 June 2007	
30 August 2006	CM	Manuel Fernandes	Portsmouth	30 June 2007	
26 December 2006	AM	Diego de Souza	Grêmio	30 June 2007	
24 January 2007	CM	Manuel Fernandes	Everton	30 June 2007	
28 January 2007	AM	Andrei Karyaka	Saturn Ramenskoye	30 June 2007	
10 February 2007	ST	Marcel	São Paulo	31 December 2007	

== See also ==
- 2006–07 in Portuguese football
