= 2007 Mohammed bin Rashid International Football Championship =

Dubai Cup

Tournament details
- Host country: Dubai
- Dates: 8–10 January
- Teams: 4 (from 1 confederation)

Final positions
- Champions: (Portugal) Benfica (1st title)
- Runners-up: (Italy) Lazio
- Third place: (Germany) Bayern Munich
- Fourth place: (France) Marseille

Tournament statistics
- Matches played: 4
- Goals scored: 11 (2.75 per match)
- Top scorer(s): (France) Samir Nasri (Netherlands) Roy Makaay (2 goals)

The 2007 Mohammed bin Rashid International Football Championship, also known as the 2007 Dubai Cup, was a friendly football tournament that took place in Dubai, United Arab Emirates. The 2007 edition took place from 8 till 10 January 2007.

== Participant Teams ==
The four participant teams were clubs from the countries that got to the semi-finals of the preceding year's FIFA World Cup.

- (Italy) Società Sportiva Lazio
- (France) Olympique de Marseille
- (Germany) FC Bayern Munich
- (Portugal) S.L. Benfica

== Bracket ==
Semi-finals
8 January
(Portugal) Benfica	0(4)
(Germany) FC Bayern Munich	0(3)
8 January
(France) Olympique de Marseille	1
(Italy) Lazio	3

Final
10 January
(Portugal) Benfica	0(5)
(Italy) Lazio	0(4)
Third place
10 January
(Germany) FC Bayern Munich	4
(France) Olympique de Marseille	3

== First round ==
2007-01-08

(Portugal) Benfica	0 – 0	(Germany) Bayern Munich
Penalties
Beto (penalty missed); Luisão (penalty scored); Mantorras (penalty scored); Karagounis (penalty scored); Marco Ferreira (penalty scored)	4–3	(penalty missed) van Bommel; (penalty missed) Pizarro; (penalty scored) Salihamidžić; (penalty scored) Lúcio; (penalty scored) Podolski

2007-01-08

(France) Marseille	1 – 3	(Italy) Lazio
Nasri 28'		Mauri 21'; Makinwa 76'; Foggia 86' (pen.)

== Third place play-off ==
2007-01-10

(Germany) Bayern Munich	4 – 3	(France) Marseille
van Bommel 36'; Makaay 85', 87'; Görlitz 90'		Nasri 13'; Cissé 26'; Pagis 48'

== Final ==
2007-01-10

(Portugal) Benfica	0 – 0	(Italy) Lazio
Penalties
Luisão (penalty scored); Mantorras (penalty missed); Katsouranis (penalty scored); Paulo Jorge (penalty scored); Marco Ferreira (penalty scored); Léo (penalty missed); Pedro Correia (penalty scored)	5–4	(penalty scored) Foggia; (penalty missed) Tare; (penalty scored) Cribari; (penalty scored) Manfredini; (penalty scored) Ledesma; (penalty missed) Bonetto; (penalty missed) Ballotta

Dubai Cup
2007 Winners

Benfica
First Title

=== Goalscorers ===
2 goals

- (France) Samir Nasri
- (Netherlands) Roy Makaay

1 goal

- (France) Djibril Cissé
- (France) Mickaël Pagis
- (Germany) Andreas Görlitz
- (Italy) Pasquale Foggia
- (Italy) Stefano Mauri
- (Netherlands) Mark van Bommel
- (Nigeria) Stephen Makinwa

== See also ==
- Dubai Football Challenge
