= 2004–05 S.L. Benfica season =

Benfica
2004–05 season
- President: Luís Filipe Vieira
- Head coach: Giovanni Trapattoni
- Stadium: Estádio da Luz
- Primeira Liga: 1st
- Taça de Portugal: Runners-up
- Supertaça Cândido de Oliveira: Runners-up
- UEFA Champions League: Third qualifying round
- UEFA Cup: Round of 32
- Top goalscorer: League: Simão (15); All: Simão (22)
- Highest home attendance: 64,000 v Sporting CP (14 May 2005)
- Lowest home attendance: 20,000 v Banská Bystrica (30 September 2004)
- Biggest win: Benfica 4–0 Vitória de Setúbal (7 November 2004); Benfica 4–0 Boavista (16 January 2005)
- Biggest defeat: 3 goal difference in 3 matches
Home colours	Away colours

The 2004–05 European football season was the 101st season of Sport Lisboa e Benfica's existence and the club's 71st consecutive season in the top flight of Portuguese football. The season ran from 1 July 2004 to 30 June 2005; Benfica competed domestically in the Primeira Liga and the Taça de Portugal. The club also participated in the UEFA Champions League as a result of finishing second in the Primeira Liga in the previous season.

José Antonio Camacho led Benfica to another second-place finish and broke an eight-year title drought; he attracted interest from Real Madrid, who signed him in late May. As a replacement, Benfica unsuccessfully inquired after Luiz Felipe Scolari for the position. After much speculation, Benfica announced they had recruited Giovanni Trapattoni, the Italian national team's former manager. Benfica signed more players than the year before, but only Quim, Manuel dos Santos and Azar Karadas became regular first-team fixtures. The most significant departure was that of Tiago, who had been a regular for the past two seasons. Because their second-place finish only granted a place in the third qualifying round of the UEFA Champions League, Benfica had to play Anderlecht for a place in the group stage. A 3–1 loss on aggregate led to relegation to the 2004–05 UEFA Cup. Between both legs, Benfica contested and lost the 2004 Supercup with Porto.

Domestically, Benfica started the season with consecutive wins, rising to the top of the table by early October. After a home loss in the Clássico, the team's results became poorer, with three draws and two losses that caused the team to drop to third place by New Year. Benfica continued to slip in January, losing the Lisbon derby and twice dropping to fifth place. A home win against Sporting CP for the Portuguese Cup had an apparent positive effect on the players; their best period all season came as they regained first place and opened a six-point lead over the team in second place.

The league was unusually competitive; a mistake in early April caused Benfica to lose much of their lead. Qualifying for the Portuguese Cup final did not help them to gather momentum. In early May, Benfica suffered a major blow, losing away to Penafiel and dropping to second. A crucial win against Sporting brought back their title hope, and a week later Benfica won their first league title in ten seasons. The season ended with a loss against Vitória de Setúbal in the Taça de Portugal final, preventing Benfica from winning their first double since 1987.

== Season summary ==
=== Pre-season ===
After ending an eight-season drought and ensuring qualification to the UEFA Champions League for a second year, José Antonio Camacho was linked to the open position at Real Madrid before the end of the season. On 25 May 2004, his move there was made official. Benfica looked for replacements with the same profile as Camacho; they offered the position to Luiz Felipe Scolari, according to his agent. On 9 June, Scolari said, "When people say I signed a contract with Benfica, they're lying! It's shameless and is bad will with the national team. To Benfica I won't go."

In mid-June, Benfica restricted their choices to former Espanyol manager Luis Fernández and Italian national team manager Giovanni Trapattoni. Negotiations with Fernández failed, but on 17 June, club president Luís Filipe Vieira announced that Benfica had signed a new manager but did not name him. On 5 July, a day after the end of the UEFA Euro 2004, Benfica announced Trapattoni as manager. The 65-year-old Italian started his managerial career in 1974 and came to recognition at Juventus, where he became one of Italy's greatest managers, the only one to have won all UEFA club competitions and the Intercontinental Cup. To assist him, he brought fitness coach Fausto Rossi and goalkeeping coach Adriano Barbin, while Álvaro Magalhães remained as assistant manager.

In the transfer market, the most significant signings were of 28-year-old Quim, Portugal's second-choice goalkeeper, to compete with incumbent starter José Moreira. Defender Takis Fyssas also saw the arrival of a competitor, former Marseille player Manuel dos Santos. Benfica also signed Norwegian striker Azar Karadas after his compelling performance against them in the previous season's UEFA Cup with Rosenborg. The most significant departure was Tiago, who moved to Chelsea for a fee that Record announced was around €12 million. Other than him, only Armando Sá and Hélder Cristóvão were regularly used, and both continued their careers abroad, with Villarreal and Paris Saint-Germain respectively.

The pre-season started on 5 July with four days of medical tests on Estádio da Luz. On 9 July, Benfica travelled to Nyon, Switzerland, for a two-week tour, where they played their first pre-season matches, with wins against Real Zaragoza and Marseille. On 22 July, Benfica returned to Portugal and continued their pre-season with a presentation match against Real Madrid on 25 July, and the Guadiana Trophy with Real Betis on 28 July. Due to league ranking in 2004, Benfica had to play in the third qualifying round of the Champions League, where they were drawn with Anderlecht on 30 July. The pre-season ended with matches against Braga on 1 August and Estoril on August 14.

=== August–September ===
Benfica started their season with the third qualifying round of the Champions League, attempting to make their first presence in the group stage since 1998–99. On 10 August, Benfica beat Anderlecht 1–0 after Zlatko Zahovič scored in the 13th minute. When asked why Anderlecht had more goal opportunities than Benfica, Trapattoni said, "Do you know international football? It is very balanced nowadays. I wish we had more chances but our opponent was stronger." Following the win, Benfica were due to meet Porto in the Supercup on 20 August. Ricardo Quaresma of Porto scored the only goal of the game in an individual effort. It was Benfica's tenth consecutive loss in the competition; the previous win occurred in 1989. Four days later, Benfica travelled to Belgium to play Anderlecht. The home team scored first by Aruna Dindane, who scored another on the hour-mark. Nenad Jestrović scored the last goal. Trapattoni blamed fatigue and anxiety for the defeat, saying, "I said we would try to score, but lacked composure to do so. In the first half he spent a lot of energy. On the second, we tried to fight back, until he conceded a second goal, which killed us." The fans insulted the team on their arrival in Lisbon. On 29 August, Benfica made their debut in the Primeira Liga by visiting Beira-Mar. Two goals in the first half and another within five minutes of the second, gave Benfica a lead that help them beat the locals.

On 11 September, after the international matches Benfica returned with a home match against Moreirense. Petit opened the game with a free kick, while Simão set the final score in the 83rd minute. The following Thursday, Benfica played the first round of the UEFA Cup against Slovak team Banská Bystrica. Benfica dominated the match, winning 3–0 with a double from Simão and one from João Pereira. On 19 September, Benfica travelled to Coimbra to face Académica, beating them 1–0 with a goal from Simão to reach the top of the league table. Trapattoni praised his team and said leading is important to their mentality: "I am happy with the win, but also with the character they have shown. I had the opportunity to lead in Italy and Germany and it is very important. The team starts to believe in themselves more and more." A week later, Benfica hosted Braga. Despite playing with two players upfront, Benfica was unable to score, splitting points with them. After the game, Trapattoni acknowledged the difficult game his team had played, saying, "The final score could disappoint the fans, but let's not forget we are still leaders. Our opponent was a very dangerous team. We had three good chances in the first half, but could not score." On 30 September, Benfica closed the month by hosting Banská Bystrica. Benfica wasted opportunities to build up their score, only beating the Slovaks by 2–0.

=== October–November ===
October began with an away match away in Guimarães against Vitória de Guimarães. Benfica played against ten men throughout the second half, securing a win in the 91st minute when Geovanni converted a free kick. Following a two-week international break, Benfica received Porto on 17 October. The match was notable for the controversy regarding Olegário Benquerença refereeing, with Porto winning 1–0 with a goal from Benni McCarthy. Trapattoni criticized the referee, saying, "I have witness things I had never witnessed before in all of my career." The following Thursday, Benfica opened their UEFA Cup group stage campaign with a home win against Heerenveen. Dos Santos scored the opening goal and Nuno Gomes increased the lead to 2–0. Heerenven levelled the score with a penalty in the 53rd minute, but Benfica fought back and scored twice to win the first points. On 24 October, Benfica played at home against Nacional. The opening goal was scored in the second-half by Azar Karadas, with Tomo Šokota bringing the score to 2–0 minutes later; Nacional evened it to 2–1, but Benfica held on and won the game. Three days later, Benfica started their Portuguese Cup campaign against the third tier club Oriental de Lisboa. Two goals from Šokota and another from Geovanni helped the club progress into the next round. On 31 October, Benfica visited the Estádio Cidade de Barcelos to play Gil Vicente. Benfica were surprised by the home team and conceded first with a goal from Nandinho. In the last minute of the match, Simão equalized, allowing Benfica to gain a point. Trapattoni blamed the team's naïvety for the goal conceded, but praised their character for not giving up.

Benfica opened November with a UEFA Cup match away against German side VfB Stuttgart. They conceded the first goal by Cacau in the first half and let in two more—both headers—in the second. Trapattoni attributed the defeat to the superior physical ability of the Germans. On 7 November, Benfica hosted Vitória de Setúbal and defeated them 4–0, retaining first place in the league. Six days later, Benfica dropped two points after a 1–0 loss at the Estádio dos Barreiros to Marítimo. On 21 November, Benfica hosted Rio Ave and had a chance to regain the top spot. After building a 3–1 lead at half-time, Benfica allowed the visitors to equalize the game, costing them two more points. Trapattoni criticized his team for the way it conceded the 3–3 draw after a free-kick for Benfica turned into a deadly counter-attack against them. On the following Thursday, Benfica received Dinamo Zagreb for the UEFA Cup. Two first-half goals secured the second win in the group stage for Benfica. On the last match of November, Benfica visited the Estádio Dr. Magalhães Pessoa, home of União de Leiria, where they conceded a goal in a counter-attack and were unable to equalize in over 70 minutes, losing the match. The loss was their first as visitors; the club slid to fourth place, having lost 12 points since the Clássico. Trapattoni said Benfica lacked composure in the conceded goal, a problem he had previously addressed but still occurred. He remained confident because the league was long and very balanced.

=== December–January ===
December started with the last group stage match of the UEFA Cup. Benfica visited Beveren and won 3–0 with a double from Zlatko Zahovič, ensuring qualification for the round of 32 behind Stuttgart. On 6 December, Benfica received Estoril. The visitors scored first, but Benfica responded through Simão with a double inside ten minutes, giving them the first league win in a month and returning them to first place. On 12 December, Benfica played away to Belenenses. Trapattoni's team did not perform to expectations and lost 4–1, the largest defeat there since 1947–48. Trapattoni remained optimistic, saying, "Losing a game like this is not catastrophic. Give up? No, that is not my vocabulary." In the aftermath of the defeat, José Moreira lost his starting goalkeeping place to Quim. Trapattoni, in the preview for the upcoming match with Penafiel, said, "Benfica needs to forget this humiliating defeat quickly. Four goals ... three goals in eight minutes, it is true we are in a state of emergency. We have the mentality to react and will do so." On the same day, Benfica discovered their next opponent in the UEFA Cup would be CSKA Moscow. On 18 December, Benfica beat Penafiel 1–0 with a goal from Argel. On 21 December, Benfica played the last game of the year, hosting third-tier team AD Oliveirense for the Portuguese Cup. Benfica won 4–1 but required extra time to beat the visitors after a 1–1 draw in regular time. Throughout the game, Benfica fans whistled the team for the poor game. Later, Trapattoni acknowledged the performance, saying, "For the first time, I am with the fans since the team deserved the whistles."

In January, Benfica opened the month with a visit to the Estádio José Alvalade to face Sporting CP in the Lisbon derby. Sporting's Liédson scored first in the 22nd minute and Nuno Gomes equalized four minutes later. In the second half, Liedson finalized the score at 2–1 to Sporting. Benfica dropped to fifth place, their worst league position all season. After the game, Trapattoni said he was slow to make substitutions in the second half, but acknowledged that Sporting performed better. On 16 January, Benfica received Boavista with the chance to become joint leaders. Benfica opened the game with a penalty in the 40th minute by Simão, with Nuno Gomes and Mantorras also scoring in a 4–0 win. Trapattoni praised his team, saying, "This is their best performance so far". On 22 January, Benfica played Beira-Mar at the Estádio da Luz. The Aveiro-based side gave a strong performance; Santiago Silva scored a double, beating Benfica 2–0. Trapattoni was disappointed with his players, saying he had expectations after the win with Boavista but with this performance, he needed to start again. Four days later, Benfica met Sporting at home for the sixth round of the Portuguese Cup. Benfica's Geovanni scored first but Sporting responded with two goals in three minutes and Geovanni equalized five minutes later. As the game went into extra time, Paíto and Simão both scored in individual efforts, bringing the final scoreline to 3–3. From the penalty spot, Benfica converted all of their goals, while Miguel Garcia missed one for Sporting. On 29 January, Benfica visited the Estádio D. Afonso Henriques to play Moreirense. An opening goal by Nuno Gomes was followed by a second by Nuno Assis and Benfica won the match 2–1; it was their first away win in five matches.

=== February–March ===
February began with a home game against Académica. Benfica's Geovanni scored the first goal in the 32nd minute and Simão later scored twice to win the match 3–0. Benfica returned to joint-first and won their second consecutive league game for the first time in four months. On 12 February, Benfica played away at the Estádio Municipal de Braga against Braga. The match ended in draw and a sharing of points. Trapattoni was happy with the draw, saying Benfica entered a little nervously and were lucky not to lose in some random event, like in past games. On the following Thursday, Benfica travelled to Russia to play in the Kuban Stadium against CKSA Moscow. With the Russians just recently coming out of their pre-season, Benfica dominated possession but failed to score, losing 2–0. Trapattoni blamed the pitch, saying he was confident Benfica could win in Lisbon. On 21 February, Benfica received Vitória de Guimarães; Benfica's Geovanni scored in the first half and Nuno Gomes assisted Nuno Assis to make the score 2–0. César Peixoto of Guimarães scored in the second half. Benfica held the advantage and remained joint-first with Porto. Three days later, Benfica played the second leg of the UEFA Cup. They drew 1–1 and were eliminated from the competition. After the game, Trapattoni refuted any lack of attitude from Benfica, saying, "We played well. I could not ask them anything." On 28 February, Benfica visited the Estádio do Dragão for the second Classico of the season. Porto's Benni McCarthy scored first but Geovanni equalized in the 75th minute, setting the final score at 1–1. It was the first time since 1993–94 that Benfica did not lose away to Porto.

Benfica opened March with the quarter-finals of the Portuguese Cup. They played Beira-Mar at home and won 1–0 with a goal from João Pereira in the 25th minute. Trapattoni analysed the game, saying, "Everybody knew this match was a revenge for the league defeat. In the first half we dominated, in the second we were dominated. Beira-Mar was fresher – it is not easy to play every three days. Still, we deserved to win." Three days later, on 6 March, Benfica played at Estádio da Madeira against Nacional and won 1–0 with a goal from Nuno Gomes. Near the end, Quim brought down Wendel Geraldo inside the box but failed to convert the penalty, hitting the woodwork. Trapattoni praised his team's commitment saying their victory was deserved and they were lucky with the missed penalty. On 12 March, Benfica played at home against Gil Vicente. With the chance to open a three-point lead over Porto, Benfica won 2–0 with an opening goal from Mantorras and a second from Miguel. After the game, Trapattoni argued with a fan after the second goal; he said, "I argued with a fan, not fans. I was not nice to him, but since the first game, he has not been nice to me." He added that the win was very important and that Benfica had not won anything yet. Benfica closed March with an away game against Vitória de Setúbal. Benfica's Manuel Fernandes scored first, with Geovanni doubling the lead in the second half in a 2–0 win.

=== April–May ===
On 3 April, Benfica hosted Marítimo at home. It was a high-scoring match; the teams scored five goals within the first 30 minutes, with a 3–2 score at half-time. In the second half, Mitchell van der Gaag of Marítimo equalized the game in the 48th minute. With three minutes to extra-time, Mantorras scored the fourth goal for Benfica, securing them a 4–3 win. Trapattoni said, "In the 30 years of my career, I had never had such exciting game as this one." A week later, Benfica visited the Estádio dos Arcos to play Rio Ave. Despite overwhelming support from their fans, Benfica were surprised by the home team and lost 1–0 after a 91st-minute goal.

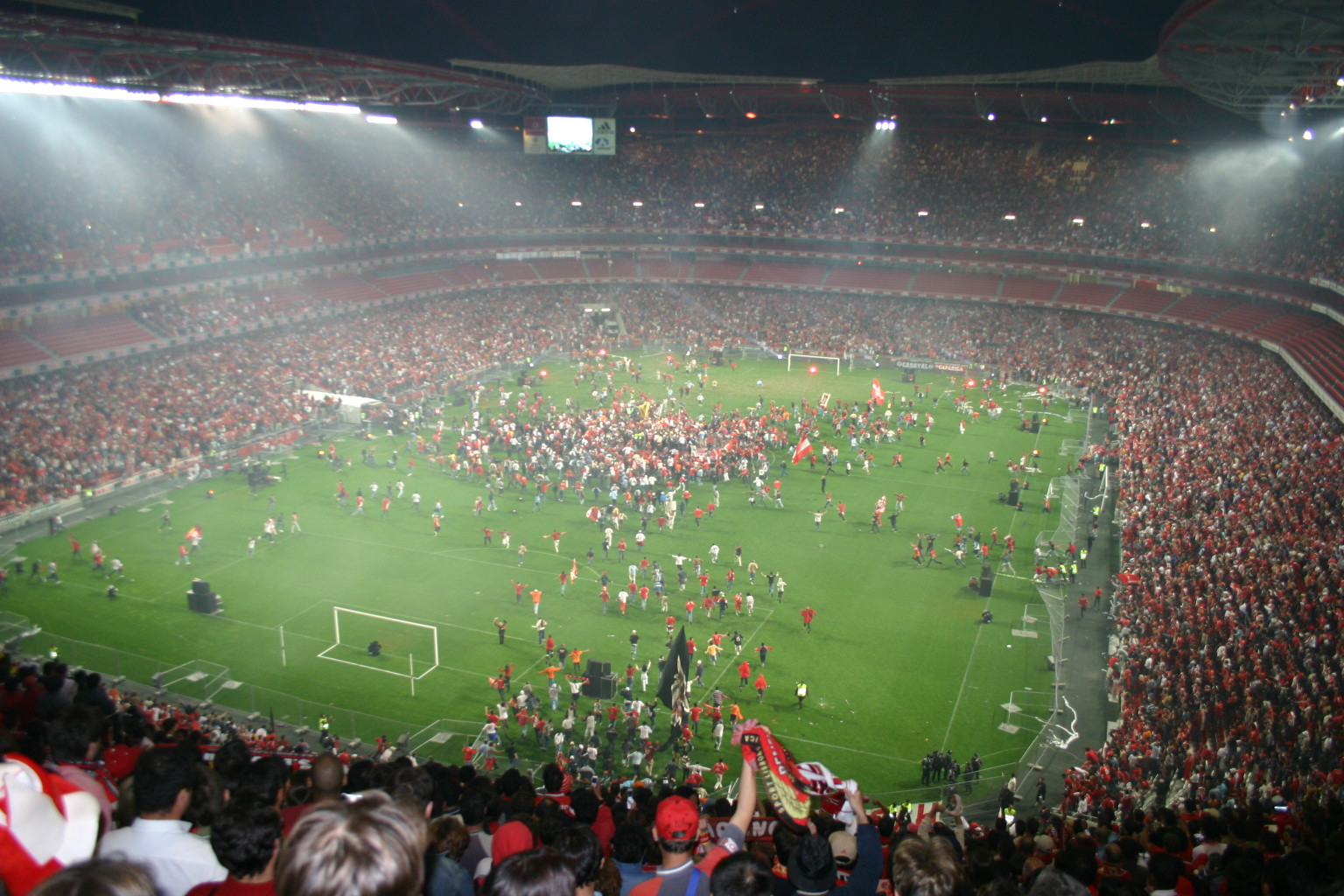
Benfica fans celebrating the league title

Trapattoni still believed Benifca could win the title, saying, "What matters is to remain confident." On 16 April, Benfica suffered another setback, nearly losing at home against União de Leiria. A goal scored by João Paulo gave the visitors the lead for over 70 minutes until Mantorras scored the equalizer in the 93rd minute. Four days later, Benfica met Estrela da Amadora for the Portuguese Cup semi-final. Benfica dominated the second tier-side and won 3–0, qualifying for the tournament's final. Trapattoni said Benfica had achieved half of their objective in the competition; the other half was winning it. On 24 April, Benfica played away to Estoril. The Estoril team played at the Estádio António Coimbra da Mota, but decided to move the game to Estádio do Algarve for financial reasons. Estoril scored the opening goal in the 12th minute and Benfica's Luisão equalized 64 minutes later. With Estoril reduced to nine players after two ejections, Mantorras scored the winning goal for Benfica in the 82nd minute. Benfica finished April by hosting Belenenses on April 30, beating them 1–0. Simão scored the only goal of the match.

Approaching the end of the season, Benfica had a three-point lead over Sporting in the league table. Their next opponent was Penafiel, whom they played at their home ground. With the stadium packed with Benfica fans, Penafiel surprised Benfica and beat them 1–0, costing them first place. After the game, Trapattoni said, "It was good game but I did not expect this outcome. We have to keep morale because Saturday we have an important game. There we will decide who is stronger."

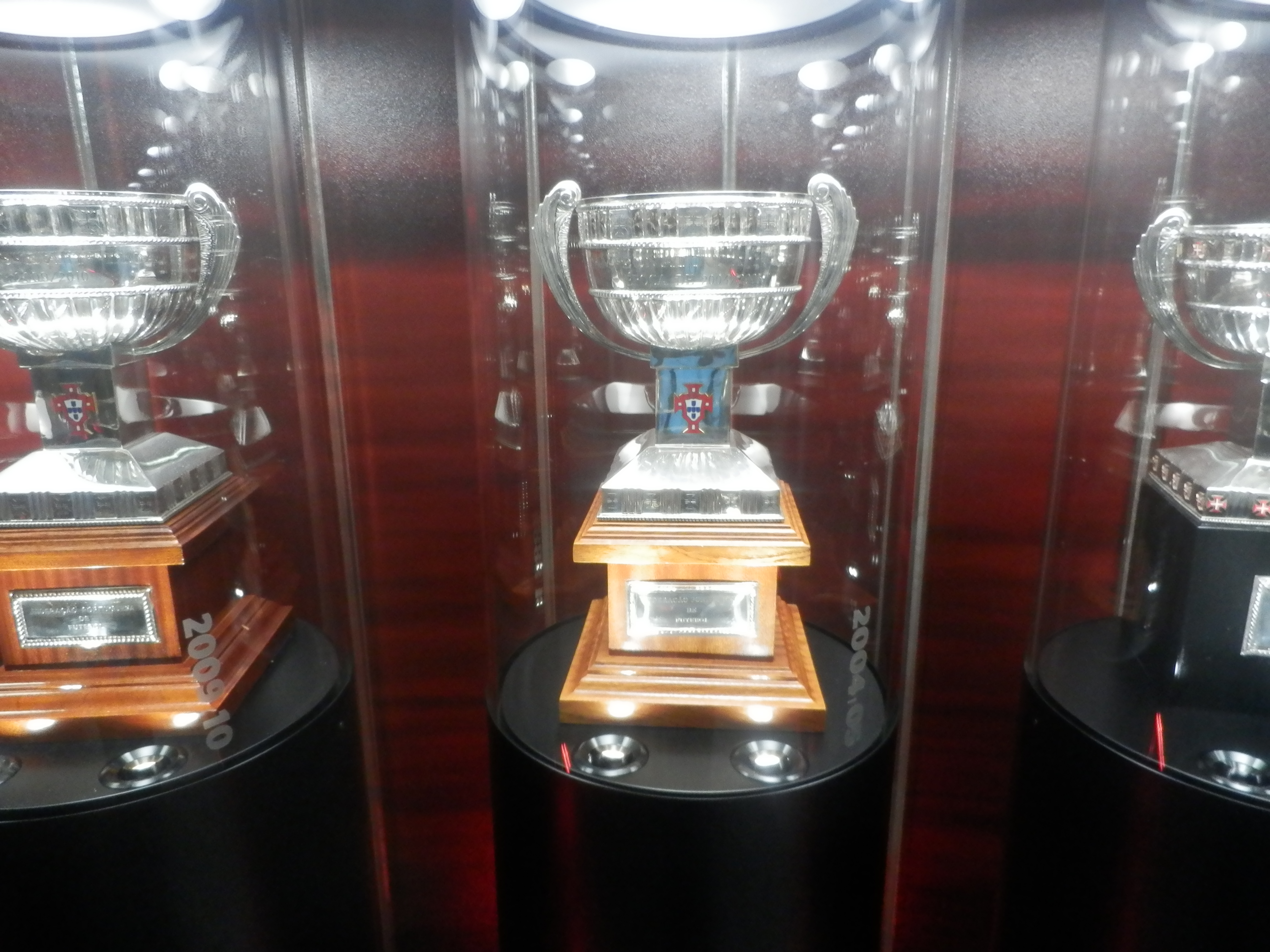
The 2004–05 Primeira Liga trophy

On 14 May, with Estádio da Luz nearly sold-out, Benfica received Sporting for a title-deciding Lisbon Derby. The high-pressure match was unlocked in the 83rd minute when Luisão jumped higher than Ricardo and headed in the winning goal. Trapattoni tried to calm excess confidence by saying Benfica still had not won the league title. Two days after the game, in an interview to Italian sports daily Gazzetta dello Sport, Trapattoni announced his intention to leave Benfica at the end of the season and return to Italy. On 22 May, Benfica visited the Estádio do Bessa to face Boavista, needing just one point to win the title. Benfica scored the opening goal with a penalty from Simão. Boavista equalized minutes later but the score remained drawn, ensuring the title for Benfica, their first in ten years and 31st overall. Trapattoni said, "Winning is always hard. This title was amazing and one of the most important of my career. It was won in a new culture for me and that makes it even better." In the last game of the season, the 2005 Taça de Portugal final, Benfica's Simão opened the scoring but allowed Vitória de Setúbal to score twice, losing Benfica their ninth tournament final. The loss also prevented a double for Benfica; it would have been their first since 1987. Two days after the defeat, Trapattoni confirmed he was leaving Benfica for personal reasons, ending his one-year tenure in Portugal.

== Competitions ==
Win Draw Loss Postponed

=== Overall record ===
Competition	First match	Last match	Record								
Competition	First match	Last match	G	W	D	L	GF	GA	GD	Win %	Source
Primeira Liga	29 August 2004	22 May 2005	34	19	8	7	51	31	+20	55.88	
Taça de Portugal	27 October 2004	29 May 2005	6	4	1	1	15	7	+8	66.67	
Supertaça Cândido de Oliveira	20 August 2004	20 August 2004	1	0	0	1	0	1	−1	0.00	
UEFA Champions League	10 August 2004	24 August 2004	2	1	0	1	1	3	−2	50.00	
UEFA Cup	16 September 2004	24 February 2005	8	5	1	2	15	8	+7	62.50	
Total			51	29	10	12	82	50	+32	56.86	

=== Supertaça Cândido de Oliveira ===
20 August 2004	Porto	1–0	Benfica	Coimbra
20:30	Quaresma 56'			Stadium: Estádio Cidade de Coimbra; Attendance: 22,023; Referee: Carlos Xistra

=== Primeira Liga ===
==== League table ====
Pos	Team	Pld	W	D	L	GF	GA	GD	Pts	Qualification or relegation
1	Benfica (C)	34	19	8	7	51	31	+20	65	Qualification to Champions League group stage
2	Porto	34	17	11	6	39	26	+13	62	Qualification to Champions League group stage
3	Sporting CP	34	18	7	9	66	36	+30	61	Qualification to Champions League third qualifying round
4	Braga	34	16	10	8	45	28	+17	58	Qualification to UEFA Cup first round
5	Vitória de Guimarães	34	15	9	10	38	29	+9	54	Qualification to UEFA Cup first round

Source: Foradejogo
Rules for classification: 1) points; 2) head-to-head points; 3) head-to-head goal difference; 4) goal difference; 5) number of goals scored
(C) Champions

==== Results by round ====
Round	1	2	3	4	5	6	7	8	9	10	11	12	13	14	15	16	17	18	19	20	21	22	23	24	25	26	27	28	29	30	31	32	33	34
Ground	A	H	A	H	A	H	H	A	H	A	H	A	H	A	H	A	H	H	A	H	A	H	A	A	H	A	H	A	H	A	H	A	H	A
Result	W	W	W	D	W	L	W	D	W	D	D	L	W	L	W	L	W	L	W	W	D	W	D	W	W	W	W	L	D	W	W	L	W	D
Position	3	2	1	1	1	1	1	1	1	2	2	3	2	4	3	5	3	5	4	1	2	1	2	1	1	1	1	1	1	1	1	2	1	1

Source: ForaDeJogo
A = Away; H = Home; W = Win; D = Draw; L = Loss

==== Matches ====
29 August 2004 1	Beira-Mar	2–3	Benfica	Aveiro
20:30	Alcaraz 63'; Beto 68'		Karadas 42', 49'; Petit 45'	Stadium: Estádio Municipal de Aveiro; Attendance: 17,052; Referee: Elmano Santos

11 September 2004 2	Benfica	2–0	Moreirense	Lisbon
21:15	Petit 24'; Simão 83'			Stadium: Estádio da Luz; Attendance: 25,011; Referee: Rui Costa

19 September 2004 3	Académica	0–1	Benfica	Coimbra
21:15			Simão 74'	Stadium: Estádio Cidade de Coimbra; Attendance: 20,128; Referee: Paulo Paraty

26 September 2004 4	Benfica	0–0	Braga	Lisbon
19:15				Stadium: Estádio da Luz; Attendance: 30,000; Referee: João Ferreira

3 October 2004 5	Vitória Guimarães	1–2	Benfica	Guimarães
21:30	Ferreira (yellow card) 15' (yellow-red card) 41'; Moreno 78'		Simão 68'; Geovanni 90+1'	Stadium: Estádio D. Afonso Henriques; Attendance: 22,829; Referee: Jorge Sousa

17 October 2004 6	Benfica	0–1	Porto	Lisbon
21:15	Nuno Gomes (red card) 60'		McCarthy 10'; Pepe (red card) 60'	Stadium: Estádio da Luz; Attendance: 60,000; Referee: Olegário Benquerença

24 October 2004 7	Benfica	2–1	Nacional	Lisbon
19:15	Karadas 61'; Šokota 80'		Goulart 87'	Stadium: Estádio da Luz; Attendance: 15,000; Referee: Mário Mendes

31 October 2004 8	Gil Vicente	1–1	Benfica	Barcelos
20:30	Nandinho 39'		Simão 90+6'; Fyssas (yellow card) 34' (yellow-red card) 84'	Stadium: Estádio Cidade de Barcelos; Attendance: 12,500; Referee: Duarte Gomes

7 November 2004 9	Benfica	4–0	Vitória Setúbal	Lisbon
19:15	Karadas 31'; Šokota 50'; Geovanni 72'; Simão 90+2'			Stadium: Estádio da Luz; Attendance: 36,048; Referee: Paulo Costa

13 November 2004 10	Marítimo	1–1	Benfica	Funchal
21:15	Pena 10'		Simão 16'	Stadium: Estádio dos Barreiros; Attendance: 7,000; Referee: Bruno Paixão

21 November 2004 11	Benfica	3–3	Rio Ave	Lisbon
19:45	Simão 3', 23'; Šokota 30'		Franco 25'; Paulo César 60'; Jacques 80'	Stadium: Estádio da Luz; Attendance: 20,000; Referee: Nuno Almeida

28 November 2004 12	União de Leiria	1–0	Benfica	Leiria
18:45	Fangueiro 13'			Stadium: Estádio Dr. Magalhães Pessoa; Attendance: 15,300; Referee: António Costa

6 December 2004 13	Benfica	2–1	Estoril	Lisbon
20:30	Simão 34', 43' (pen.); Fernandes (red card) 36'		João Paulo 5'	Stadium: Estádio da Luz; Attendance: 25,000; Referee: Paulo Pereira

12 December 2004 14	Belenenses	4–1	Benfica	Lisbon
20:00	Antchouet 24'; Lourenço 29' (pen.); José Pedro 34', 73'		Šokota 75'	Stadium: Estádio do Restelo; Attendance: 15,000; Referee: Paulo Paraty

18 December 2004 15	Benfica	1–0	Penafiel	Lisbon
21:15	Argel 23'			Stadium: Estádio da Luz; Attendance: 33,843; Referee: Lucílio Baptista

8 January 2005 16	Sporting CP	2–1	Benfica	Lisbon
20:45	Liédson 22', 68'; Rui Jorge (red card) 37'		Nuno Gomes 26'; Alcides (red card) 67'	Stadium: Estádio de Alvalade; Attendance: 46,889; Referee: Duarte Gomes

16 January 2005 17	Benfica	4–0	Boavista	Lisbon
20:45	Simão 40' (pen.); Nuno Gomes 58', 67'; Mantorras 90+4'		Zé Manel (red card) 57'	Stadium: Estádio da Luz; Attendance: 25,000; Referee: João Ferreira

22 January 2005 18	Benfica	0–2	Beira-Mar	Lisbon
21:00			S. Silva 37', 66'; R. Silva (red card) 82'	Stadium: Estádio da Luz; Attendance: 24,500; Referee: Paulo Baptista

29 January 2005 19	Moreirense	1–2	Benfica	Guimarães
21:15	Armando 75'		Nuno Gomes 9'; Nuno Assis 37'	Stadium: Estádio D. Afonso Henriques; Attendance: 8,000; Referee: Paulo Paraty

6 February 2005 20	Benfica	3–0	Académica	Lisbon
20:45	Geovanni 32'; Simão 58', 82'			Stadium: Estádio da Luz; Attendance: 25,000; Referee: João Vilas Boas

12 February 2005 21	Braga	0–0	Benfica	Braga
21:15				Stadium: Estádio Municipal de Braga; Attendance: 27,500; Referee: Paulo Costa

21 February 2005 22	Benfica	2–1	Vitória de Guimarães	Lisbon
20:30	Geovanni 12'; Nuno Assis 44'		Peixoto 46'; Rafael (red card) 84'; Silva (red card) 87'	Stadium: Estádio da Luz; Attendance: 30,000; Referee: Hélio Santos

28 February 2005 23	Porto	1–1	Benfica	Porto
21:15	McCarthy 66'		Geovanni 75'	Stadium: Estádio do Dragão; Attendance: 50,218; Referee: António Costa

6 March 2005 24	Nacional	0–1	Benfica	Funchal
20:45			Nuno Gomes 49'	Stadium: Estádio da Madeira; Attendance: 2,500; Referee: Bruno Paixão

12 March 2005 25	Benfica	2–0	Gil Vicente	Lisbon
20:45	Mantorras 52'; Miguel 89'		Rovérsio (yellow card) 45' (yellow-red card) 72'	Stadium: Estádio da Luz; Attendance: 35,000; Referee: Rui Costa

19 March 2005 26	Vitória de Setúbal	0–2	Benfica	Setúbal
21:15	Veríssimo (red card) 27'		Fernandes 43'; Geovanni 64'	Stadium: Estádio do Bonfim; Attendance: 15,000; Referee: João Vilas Boas

3 April 2005 27	Benfica	4–3	Marítimo	Lisbon
20:30	Nuno Gomes 6', 23'; Miguel 17'; Mantorras 87'		Pena 7', 48'; Van der Gaag 30'	Stadium: Estádio da Luz; Attendance: 52,000; Referee: Paulo Baptista

10 April 2005 28	Rio Ave	1–0	Benfica	Vila do Conde
19:15	Miguelito 90+1'			Stadium: Estádio do Rio Ave FC; Attendance: 12,100; Referee: António Costa

16 April 2005 29	Benfica	1–1	União Leiria	Lisbon
21:30	Mantorras 90+3'		João Paulo 17'	Stadium: Estádio da Luz; Attendance: 45,000; Referee: João Ferreira

24 April 2005 30	Estoril	1–2	Benfica	Faro
19:15	Sousa 12'; Duarte (yellow card) 1' (yellow-red card) 18'; João Paulo (red card) 78'		Luisão 76'; Mantorras 82'	Stadium: Estádio do Algarve; Attendance: 28,000; Referee: Hélio Santos

30 April 2005 31	Benfica	1–0	Belenenses	Lisbon
19:15	Simão 69' (pen.)			Stadium: Estádio da Luz; Attendance: 55,000; Referee: Mário Mendes

7 May 2005 32	Penafiel	1–0	Benfica	Penafiel
21:15	N'Doye 61'			Stadium: Estádio Municipal 25 de Abril; Attendance: 2,400; Referee: Pedro Proença

14 May 2005 33	Benfica	1–0	Sporting CP	Lisbon
19:45	Luisão 83'		Beto (red card) 87'	Stadium: Estádio da Luz; Attendance: 64,000; Referee: Paulo Paraty

22 May 2005 34	Boavista	1–1	Benfica	Porto
19:15	Éder 43'		Simão 38' (pen.)	Stadium: Estádio do Bessa; Attendance: 30,000; Referee: Pedro Henriques

=== Taça de Portugal ===
27 October 2004 Fourth Rd	Benfica	3–1	Oriental	Lisbon
18:00	Šokota 27', 71'; Geovanni 61'		Maquemba 74'	Stadium: Estádio da Luz; Referee: Pedro Proença

21 December 2004 Fifth Rd	Benfica	4–1 (a.e.t.)	AD Oliveirense	Lisbon
18:00	Simão 50' (pen.); Cristiano 96' (o.g.); Šokota 111'; Geovanni 113'		Pedro Fidalgo 25'	Stadium: Estádio da Luz; Referee: Bruno Paixão

26 January 2005 Sixth Rd	Benfica	3–3 (a.e.t.) (7–6 p)	Sporting CP	Lisbon
19:45	Geovanni 3', 22'; Simão 118'		Viana 15'; Liédson 17'; Paíto 110'	Stadium: Estádio da Luz; Referee: António Costa
	Penalties
	Petit (penalty scored); Fernandes (penalty scored); Dos Santos (penalty scored); Nuno Gomes (penalty scored); Simão (penalty scored); Carlitos (penalty scored); Alcides (penalty scored)		(penalty scored) Rochemback; (penalty scored) Tello; (penalty scored) Liédson; (penalty scored) Polga; (penalty scored) Sá Pinto; (penalty scored) Moutinho; (penalty missed) Garcia

3 March 2005 Quarter-finals	Benfica	1–0	Beira-Mar	Lisbon
20:45	Pereira 25'			Stadium: Estádio da Luz; Referee: Lucílio Baptista

20 April 2005 Semi-finals	Estrela da Amadora	0–3	Benfica	Lisbon
20:45			Nuno Gomes 37', 73'; Nuno Assis 66'	Stadium: Estádio da Reboleira; Referee: Duarte Gomes

29 May 2005 Final	Benfica	1–2	Vitória de Setúbal	Lisbon
17:00	Simão 5' (pen.)		Amoreirinha 26' (o.g.); Meyong 72'	Stadium: Estádio Nacional; Attendance: 38,000; Referee: Paulo Costa

=== UEFA Champions League ===
==== Third qualifying round ====
10 August 2004 First leg	Benfica (Portugal)	1–0	(Belgium) Anderlecht	Lisbon
20:00	Zahovič 12'	Report		Stadium: Estádio da Luz; Attendance: 60,000; Referee: Peter Fröjdfeldt

24 August 2004 Second leg	Anderlecht (Belgium)	3–0 (3–1 agg.)	(Portugal) Benfica	Brussels
19:30	Dindane 34', 60'; Ještrović 73' (pen.)	Report	Argel (red card) 74'	Stadium: Constant Vanden Stock Stadium; Attendance: 20,107; Referee: Stefano Farina

=== UEFA Cup ===
==== First round ====
16 September 2004 First leg	Banská Bystrica (Slovakia)	0–3	(Portugal) Benfica	Banská Bystrica
19:30			Simão 38', 65'; Pereira 71'	Stadium: SNP Stadium; Attendance: 10,000; Referee: Matt Messias

30 September 2004 Second leg	Benfica (Portugal)	2–0 (5–0 agg.)	(Slovakia) Banská Bystrica	Lisbon
20:00	Zahovič 13'; Nuno Gomes 18'			Stadium: Estádio da Luz; Attendance: 20,000; Referee: Philippe Leuba

==== Group G ====
Pos	Team	Pld	W	D	L	GF	GA	GD	Pts	Qualification	STU	BEN	HVN	DZ	BEV
1	(Germany) VfB Stuttgart	4	3	0	1	10	3	+7	9	Advance to knockout stage	—	3–0	—	2–1	—
2	(Portugal) Benfica	4	3	0	1	9	5	+4	9	Advance to knockout stage	—	—	4–2	2–0	—
3	(Netherlands) Heerenveen	4	2	1	1	6	6	0	7	Advance to knockout stage	1–0	—	—	—	1–0
4	(Croatia) Dinamo Zagreb	4	1	1	2	9	7	+2	4		—	—	2–2	—	6–1
5	(Belgium) Beveren	4	0	0	4	2	15	−13	0		1–5	0–3	—	—	—

Source: RSSSF

21 October 2004 1	Benfica (Portugal)	4–2	(Netherlands) Heerenveen	Lisbon
21:15	Dos Santos 14'; Nuno Gomes 31', 78'; Karadas 73'		Yıldırım 48'; Huntelaar 53' (pen.)	Stadium: Estádio da Luz; Attendance: 28,500; Referee: Jacek Granat

4 November 2004 2	VfB Stuttgart (Germany)	3–0	(Portugal) Benfica	Stuttgart
17:15	Cacau 31'; Meißner 53'; Kurányi 72'			Stadium: Gottlieb-Daimler-Stadion; Attendance: 46,000; Referee: Bertrand Layec

25 November 2004 3	Benfica (Portugal)	2–0	(Croatia) Dinamo Zagreb	Lisbon
20:00	Šokota 10'; Simão 29' (pen.)			Stadium: Estádio da Luz; Attendance: 32,000; Referee: Gianluca Paparesta

2 December 2004 4	Beveren (Belgium)	0–3	(Portugal) Benfica	Beveren
19:45	Copa (red card) 3'		Simão 6' (pen.); Zahovič 20', 59'	Stadium: Freethiel Stadion; Attendance: 10,000; Referee: Martin Hansson

==== Round of 32 ====
17 February 2005 First leg	CSKA Moscow (Russia)	2–0	(Portugal) Benfica	Krasnodar
19:00	Alcides 11' (o.g.); Vágner Love 60'			Stadium: Kuban Stadium; Attendance: 25,000; Referee: Alexandru Tudor

24 February 2005 Second leg	Benfica (Portugal)	1–1 (1–3 agg.)	(Russia) CSKA Moscow	Lisbon
19:00	Karadas 64'		Ignashevich 50'	Stadium: Estádio da Luz; Attendance: 30,000; Referee: Dougie McDonald

=== Friendlies ===
17 July 2004	Étoile Carouge	0–2	Benfica	Nyon, Switzerland
17:15 CET (UTC+01)			Šokota 12'; Amoreirinha 21'	Stadium: Centre sportif de Colovray Nyon

19 July 2004	Real Zaragoza	0–1	Benfica	Nyon, Switzerland
17:15 CET (UTC+01)			Zahovič 15'	Stadium: Centre sportif de Colovray Nyon

21 July 2004	Marseille	0–2	Benfica	Nyon, Switzerland
17:15 CET (UTC+01)			Zahovič 13', 88'	Stadium: Centre sportif de Colovray Nyon

25 July 2004	Benfica	2–2	Real Madrid	Lisbon, Portugal
19:30 CET (UTC+01)	Zahovič 2'; Geovanni 90+1'		Ronaldo 3'; Morientes 76'	Stadium: Estádio da Luz; Referee: Bruno Paixão

28 July 2004 Guadiana Trophy	Real Betis	3–0	Benfica	Ayamonte, Spain
19:30 CET (UTC+01)	Fernando 6', 51', 53'			Stadium: Estadio Blas Infante; Referee: Santana Ponce

1 August 2004	Braga	1–1	Benfica	Braga, Portugal
19:30 CET (UTC+01)	Césinha 58'		Amoreirinha 77'	Stadium: Estádio Municipal de Braga

2 August 2004	Estoril	0–2	Benfica	Estoril, Portugal
21:15 CET (UTC+01)			Zahovič 29'; Vilela 35'	Stadium: Estádio António Coimbra da Mota

1 June 2005	Odivelas	3–2	Benfica	Odivelas, Portugal
11:15 CET (UTC+01)		Report	Everson; Aguiar	Stadium: Estádio Arnaldo Dias; Referee: Hélio Santos

== Player statistics ==
The squad for the season consisted of the players listed in the tables below. Staff members included manager Trapattoni, Alvaro Magalhães (assistant manager), Fausto Rossi (fitness coach), and Adriano Barbin (goalkeeping coach).

Note 1: Note: Flags indicate national team as defined under FIFA eligibility rules. Players may hold more than one non-FIFA nationality.

Note 2: Players with squad numbers marked ‡ joined the club during the 2004–05 season via transfer, with more details in the following section.

No.	Pos	Nat	Player	Total		Primeira Liga		Taça de Portugal		Supertaça		Europe	
No.	Pos	Nat	Player	Apps	Goals	Apps	Goals	Apps	Goals	Apps	Goals	Apps	Goals
1	GK	(Portugal) POR	José Moreira	23	-24	15	-17	3	-2	0	0	5	-5
2^{‡}	DF	(Portugal) POR	Eurípedes Amoreirinha	12	0	8	0	1	0	0	0	3	0
3	DF	(Brazil) BRA	Argel	17	1	10	1	2	0	1	0	4	0
4	DF	(Brazil) BRA	Luisão	41	2	29	2	2	0	1	0	9	0
5^{‡}	MF	(Brazil) BRA	Paulo Almeida	16	0	6	0	1	0	1	0	8	0
6	MF	(Portugal) POR	Petit	43	2	29	2	5	0	1	0	8	0
7^{‡}	MF	(Portugal) POR	Carlitos	15	0	10	0	3	0	0	0	2	0
8^{‡}	MF	(Portugal) POR	Bruno Aguiar	31	0	19	0	5	0	1	0	6	0
9	FW	(Angola) ANG	Mantorras	18	5	15	5	1	0	0	0	2	0
10	MF	(Slovenia) SLO	Zlatko Zahovič	18	4	10	0	1	0	1	0	6	4
11	MF	(Brazil) BRA	Geovanni	45	10	31	6	6	4	0	0	8	0
12^{‡}	GK	(Portugal) POR	Quim	27	-26	19	-14	3	-5	1	-1	4	-6
13^{‡}	DF	(Brazil) BRA	Alcides	11	0	6	0	3	0	0	0	2	0
14	DF	(Greece) GRE	Takis Fyssas	25	0	16	0	6	0	0	0	3	0
15^{‡}	MF	(Portugal) POR	Nuno Assis	20	3	15	2	3	1	0	0	2	0
18^{‡}	DF	(France) FRA	Manuel dos Santos	34	1	21	0	4	0	1	0	8	1
19^{‡}	MF	(Brazil) BRA	Everson	5	0	1	0	1	0	1	0	2	0
20	MF	(Portugal) POR	Simão	49	22	34	15	4	3	1	0	10	4
21	FW	(Portugal) POR	Nuno Gomes	34	12	23	7	5	2	0	0	6	3
22^{‡}	FW	(Norway) NOR	Azar Karadas	36	6	27	4	1	0	1	0	7	2
23	DF	(Portugal) POR	Miguel	32	2	22	2	4	0	1	0	5	0
24^{‡}	GK	(France) FRA	Yannick Quesnel	1	-1	0	0	0	0	0	0	1	-1
25	FW	(Croatia) CRO	Tomo Šokota	19	8	11	4	2	3	1	0	5	1
30	DF	(Brazil) BRA	André Luís	2	0	1	0	1	0	0	0	0	0
33	DF	(Portugal) POR	Ricardo Rocha	37	0	25	0	5	0	0	0	7	0
34^{‡}	FW	(Serbia and Montenegro) SCG	Andrija Delibašić	5	0	3	0	2	0	0	0	0	0
36	DF	(Portugal) POR	Tiago Gomes	0	0	0	0	0	0	0	0	0	0
37	MF	(Portugal) POR	Manuel Fernandes	43	1	29	1	6	0	0	0	8	0
47	MF	(Portugal) POR	João Pereira	39	2	26	0	4	1	1	0	8	1
55	DF	(Portugal) POR	Eduardo Simões	0	0	0	0	0	0	0	0	0	0
65	MF	(Portugal) POR	Fernando Alexandre	0	0	0	0	0	0	0	0	0	0

== Transfers ==
=== In ===
Entry date	Position	Player	From club	Fee	Ref
2 June 2004	RW	Carlitos	Estoril	Undisclosed	
2 June 2004	DM	Paulo Almeida	Santos	Undisclosed	
21 June 2004	CB	Eurípedes Amoreirinha	Alverca	Undisclosed	
23 June 2004	GK	Yannick Quesnel	Alverca	Undisclosed	
6 July 2004	CM	Bruno Aguiar	Alverca	Loan Return	
7 July 2004	GK	Quim	Braga	Undisclosed	
18 July 2004	LB	Manuel dos Santos	Marseille	Undisclosed	
29 July 2004	ST	Azar Karadas	Rosenborg	Undisclosed	
31 July 2004	CM	Everson	Nice	Undisclosed	
30 January 2005	AM	Nuno Assis	Vitória de Guimarães	Undisclosed	

=== In by loan ===
Entry date	Position	Player	From club	Return date	Ref
2 June 2004	CB	Alcides	Chelsea	30 June 2006	
1 January 2005	CB	André Luís	Santos	30 June 2005	
31 January 2005	FW	Andrija Delibašić	Mallorca	30 June 2005	

=== Out ===
Exit date	Position	Player	To club	Fee	Ref
4 June 2004	GK	Carlos Bossio	Lanús	Free	
4 June 2004	GK	Zach Thornton	Chicago Fire	Free	
18 June 2004	RB	Paulo Cabral	Belenenses	Free	
18 June 2004	RB	Armando Sá	Villarreal	Undisclosed	
30 June 2003	GK	Nuno Santos	Santa Clara	Free	
5 July 2004	CB	Hélder Cristóvão	Paris Saint-Germain	Undisclosed	
5 July 2004	LB	Cristiano	Belenenses	Undisclosed	
5 July 2004	DM	Fernando Aguiar	Landskrona BoIS	Undisclosed	
15 July 2004	AM	Hélio Pinto	Sevilla B	Undisclosed	
15 July 2004	DM	Emílio Peixe	None	Released	
19 July 2004	CM	Tiago	Chelsea	Undisclosed	
17 August 2004	CB	Geraldo Alves	Paços de Ferreira	Free	
12 January 2005	AM	Zlatko Zahovič	Retired	Released	
18 January 2005	CB	Argel	Racing de Santander	Undisclosed	
19 January 2005	FW	Tomo Šokota	Benfica B	Demoted	
29 January 2005	RB	Ivan Dudić	Mons	Undisclosed	
24 February 2005	AM	Roger	Corinthians	Undisclosed	

=== Out by loan ===
Entry date	Position	Player	To club	Return date	Ref
16 June 2004	RB	Alex	Vitória de Guimarães	30 June 2005	
4 August 2004	CM	Ednilson	Gil Vicente	30 June 2005	
22 January 2005	GK	Yannick Quesnel	Estoril	30 June 2005	
31 January 2005	CB	Eurípedes Amoreirinha	Estoril	30 June 2005	

== See also ==
- 2004–05 in Portuguese football
