= Von Schwedler =

von Schwedler is a surname. Notable people with the surname include:

- Alex von Schwedler (born 1980), Chilean footballer
- Viktor von Schwedler (1885–1954), German military officer
