= Bommel =

Bommel may refer to

- Den Bommel, a village in the Netherlands
- Zaltbommel, a municipality and a city in the Netherlands
- Van Bommel, a Dutch surname
- Henning Bommel (born 1983), a German cyclist
