= Everson (footballer, born 1975) =

Brazilian footballer (born 1975)

Personal information
- Full name: Everson Pereira da Silva
- Date of birth: 10 November 1975 (age 50)
- Place of birth: Campo Grande, Brazil
- Height: 1.79 m (5 ft 10 in)
- Position: Midfielder

Youth career
- 1989–1990: Portuguesa de Desportos
- 1990–1996: Paraná

Senior career*
Years	Team	Apps	(Gls)
1997	América (SP)	18	(5)
1997	Girondins de Bordeaux	9	(16)
1997	Paris Saint-Germain	0	(0)
1997	Servette	6	(0)
1998–1999	Brussels	16	(5)
1999–2000	Eintracht Braunschweig	14	(6)
2000–2001	Arminia Bielefeld	10	(0)
2001–2002	VfL Osnabrück	22	(6)
2002–2004	Nice	61	(11)
2004–2007	Benfica	1	(0)
2005–2006	Benfica B	8	(2)
2006	→ Young Boys (loan)	9	(2)
2007–2008	Neuchâtel Xamax	26	(4)
2009	ES Sahel		
2009–2010	TuS Koblenz	19	(1)
2010–2011	Gueugnon	19	(1)
Total		238	(59)
- * Club domestic league appearances and goals

Everson Pereira da Silva (born 10 November 1975), known as just Everson, is a retired Brazilian footballer who played as a midfielder.

Developed at Paraná, Everson moved to Europe in 1997, spending time some time with Girondins de Bordeaux, Paris Saint-Germain and Servette. After three years in Germany, he signed with Nice in 2002, where he had the best period of his career, playing over 60 league games in two seasons, scoring eleven times.

In 2004, he moved to Benfica but found it difficult to break into the starting eleven, partially because of injuries. After three years there, intercalated between playing for the reserves, a loan deal with Young Boys, or not competing at all, he left for Neuchâtel Xamax in 2007. He represented three more teams before retiring in 2011.

== Career ==
Born in Campo Grande, Everson began his youth career at Portuguesa de Desportos in 1989, followed by a six-year spell at Paraná. After a few months with América (SP) in early 1997, he moved to Girondins de Bordeaux to play for their reserve team in the CFA, scoring 16 goals in 9 matches. That record attracted the interest of Paris Saint-Germain, who signed him that same year. After some training sessions with Ricardo Gomes, PSG sold him to Servette, where he stayed until the end of 1997. He then joined RWDM Brussels in the start of 1998, and stayed there for 18 months, a period he said it turned him into an adult. In the summer of 1999, Everson moved to German football and spent three years there, two of those in the regional leagues, first at Eintracht Braunschweig, then Arminia Bielefeld and finally VfL Osnabrück. In 2002, he joined the freshly promoted Nice, and became an undisputed starter, playing 60 matches over two seasons, scoring eleven goals, seven from free-kicks. His performances led to a move to Benfica, who signed him on a four-year contract in July 2004. Record wrote that Benfica paid Nice €1.2M to sign him. Everson was described by his former teammate, Lilian Laslandes as a strong, tactically disciplined player that could operate either as defensive or central midfielder; and possessed a powerful left foot.

Although, there was concerns that he was still suffering from a pubalgia brought from Nice, he was declared match-fit on 9 August, and made his debut for Benfica in the Supertaça Cândido de Oliveira against Porto. His first start happened in late October, in a home win against Oriental for the Taça de Portugal, followed by 11 minutes against Vitória de Setúbal, in his Primeira Liga debut. However, after months of light treatment to his pubalgia, it was decided that he needed surgery, so he was operated in mid December. with full recovery in a month. After overcoming the injury, Everson was called up by Giovanni Trapattoni on some occasions, but did not play again. Because of the 11 minutes played with Setúbal, he too won the league title. The following season, Everson was expected to remain with the first-team, but he was deemed surplus by Ronald Koeman, and ultimately demoted to the reserve team.

After half a season competing in the third tier, he was loaned to BSC Young Boys for the remainder of the season. At Young Boys, Everson helped them reach the Swiss Cup Final, which they lost to FC Sion on penalties. He returned to Benfica in the following season and spent the entire season without competing. In July 2007, he moved to Neuchâtel Xamax on a permanent deal, scoring his first goal on 1 September, against Grasshopper. After leaving Neuchâtel Xamax, he played briefly at Étoile du Sahel, returned to Germany to play for TuS Koblenz, and closed his career at age 34, in Gueugnon. In 2011, Everson returned to Nice to work in their media department; he regularly appears as a host and interviewer in videos on the official website.

== Personal life ==
Everson's son, Everson Junior and Everton Pereira are professional footballers in France.

== Honours ==
Benfica

- Primeira Liga: 2004–05
- Taça de Portugal: Runner-up 2004–05
- Supertaça Cândido de Oliveira: Runner-up 2004

Young Boys

- Swiss Cup: Runner-up 2005–06
