= Everton Pereira (footballer) =

French footballer (born 2007)

Personal information
- Full name: Everton Pereira da Silva
- Date of birth: 12 April 2007 (age 19)
- Place of birth: Nice, France
- Height: 1.75 m (5 ft 9 in)
- Position: Defensive midfielder

Team information
- Current team: Nice
- Number: 87

Youth career
- 2022–2026: Nice

Senior career*
Years	Team	Apps	(Gls)
2026–	Nice	6	(0)

International career^{‡}
2026–	France U20	3	(0)
- * Club domestic league appearances and goals as of 17:05, 10 October 2026 (UTC) ‡ National team caps and goals as of 3 October 2026

Everton Pereira da Silva (born 12 April 2007) is a French professional footballer who plays as a defensive midfielder for Ligue 1 club Nice

== Club career ==
Pereira is a product of the youth academy of Nice since 2022. He made his senior and professional debut with Nice in a 1–1 Coupe de France tie with Strasbourg on 3 January 2026.

== Personal life ==
Everton Pereira is the son of the Brazilian retired footballer, Everson, and brother of Everson Junior.

== Career statistics ==
As of match played 20 September 2026

Appearances and goals by club, season and competition
Club	Season	League			Cup		Europe		Total	
Club	Season	Division	Apps	Goals	Apps	Goals	Apps	Goals	Apps	Goals
Nice	2025–26	Ligue 1	3	0	1	0	2 (Note: Appearances in UEFA Europa League)	0	6	0
Nice	2026–27	Ligue 1	3	0	0	0	—		3	0
Career total			6	0	1	0	2	0	9	0
