= Pedro Correia (footballer, born 1987) =

Portuguese footballer

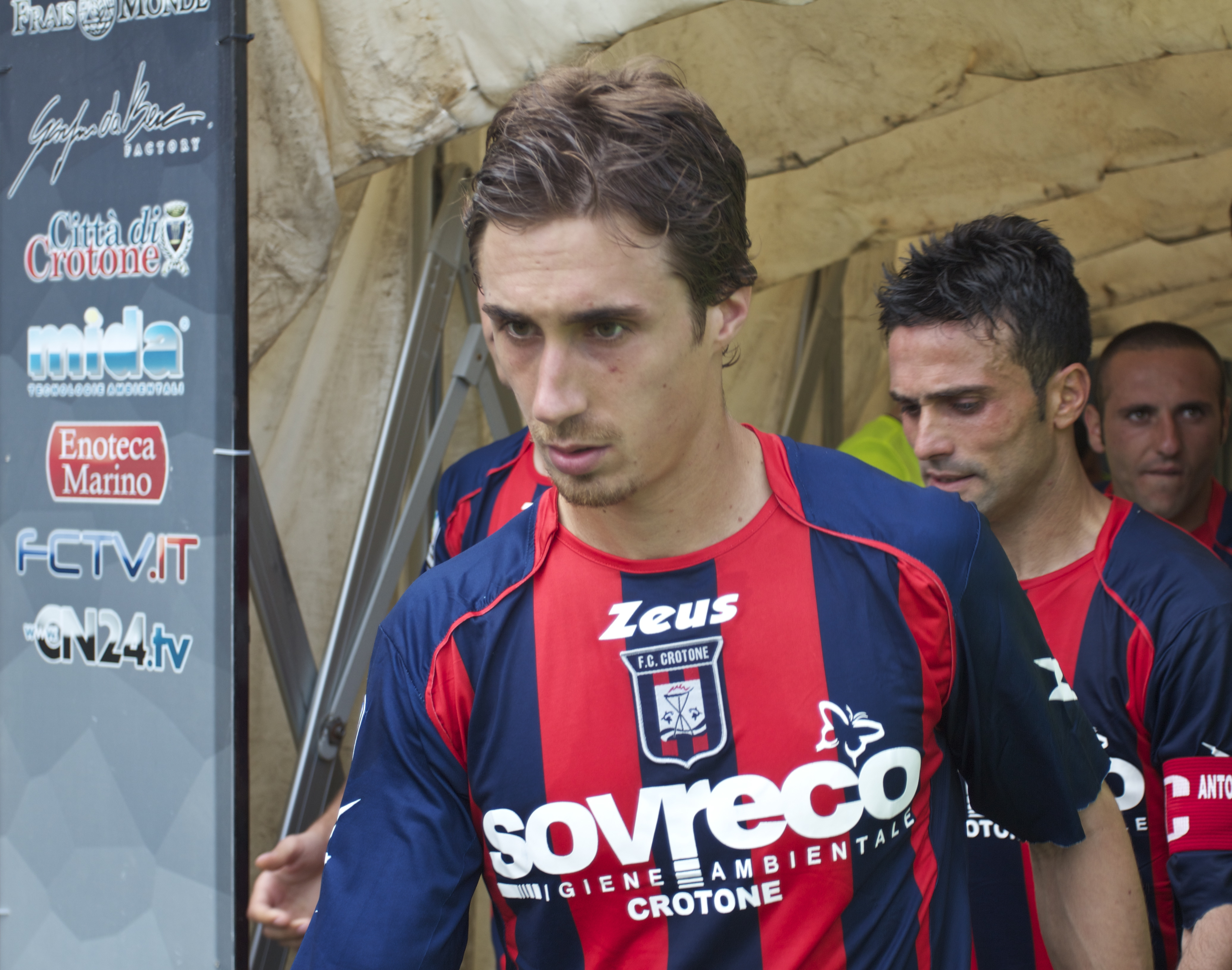
- Correia before a game with Crotone in 2011

Personal information
- Full name: Pedro Guerreiro de Jesus Correia
- Date of birth: 27 March 1987 (age 39)
- Place of birth: Lagos, Portugal
- Height: 1.78 m (5 ft 10 in)
- Position: Right-back

Youth career
- 1995–2006: Benfica

Senior career*
| Years | Team | Apps | (Gls) |
| 2006–2008 | Benfica | 0 | (0) |
| 2007–2008 | → Olhanense (loan) | 22 | (1) |
| 2008–2009 | Racing Ferrol | 28 | (0) |
| 2009–2010 | Fátima | 25 | (0) |
| 2010–2013 | Crotone | 58 | (0) |
| 2013–2016 | Vitória Guimarães | 14 | (0) |
| 2013–2016 | Vitória Guimarães B | 10 | (0) |
| 2016–2017 | Académica | 10 | (0) |
| 2017–2018 | Vilafranquense | 14 | (0) |
| Total | | 181 | (1) |

International career
| 2004 | Portugal U17 | 6 | (0) |
| 2005 | Portugal U18 | 8 | (0) |
| 2006 | Portugal U19 | 1 | (0) |
| 2006–2007 | Portugal U20 | 10 | (0) |
- * Club domestic league appearances and goals

Pedro Guerreiro de Jesus Correia (born 27 March 1987) is a Portuguese former professional footballer who played as a right-back.

== Club career ==
=== Benfica ===
Born in Lagos, Algarve, Correia joined S.L. Benfica's youth academy at age 8, eventually becoming the only player of his age to get a professional contract in 2006. During his formative years, he suffered a pubalgia and also sprained his ankle, the latter ailment sidelining him for six months.

Correia was part of Fernando Santos's senior squad in the 2006–07 season, but only started being selected after the departure of Alcides. He only managed one bench appearance during this timeframe, on 20 May 2007 against Académica de Coimbra.

In summer 2007, Correia was loaned to Segunda Liga club S.C. Olhanense. He made his professional debut on 5 August, playing the full 90 minutes in a 0–1 home loss against Gondomar S.C. in the first edition of the Taça da Liga.

Having been regularly played during his spell in his native region, Correia was called up by Benfica in May 2008 for the season ending tour in Africa. At its closure, he expressed his hope to be part of the pre-season squad for the 2008–09 campaign; however, this did not happen and, after his contract expired, he signed with Racing de Ferrol from the Spanish Segunda División B.

=== Fátima and Crotone ===
A year later, Correia returned to Portugal and reunited with former Benfica juniors coach Rui Vitória at C.D. Fátima, with the latter having already deemed the former to be best national right-back of his generation.

After starting in all his league appearances to help his team finish eighth, he joined FC Crotone of the Italian Serie B.

=== Vitória Guimarães ===
Correia moved back to his homeland and its second division in July 2013, again reuniting with Vitória but now at Vitória de Guimarães, as an intended replacement for retired Alex. In March 2014, as he was first-choice, he fractured a tibia; the initial estimated time for his recovery was six to nine months, but he ended up being only fit to compete again in May 2015.

== International career ==
Correia helped Portugal to finish third in the 2004 UEFA European Under-17 Championship, playing three games in the tournament. He also represented the nation at the 2006 European Under-19 Championship and the 2007 FIFA U-20 World Cup, totalling two appearances.

== Career statistics ==
As of 30 March 2016

| Club | Season | League | | Cup | | League Cup | | Europe | | Total | |
| Club | Season | Apps | Goals | Apps | Goals | Apps | Goals | Apps | Goals | Apps | Goals |
|---|---|---|---|---|---|---|---|---|---|---|---|
| Olhanense | 2007–08 | 22 | 1 | 2 | 0 | 1 | 0 | – | | 25 | 1 |
| Racing Ferrol | 2008–09 | 28 | 0 | 0 | 0 | – | | – | | 28 | 0 |
| Fátima | 2009–10 | 25 | 0 | 2 | 0 | 4 | 0 | – | | 31 | 0 |
| Crotone | 2010–11 | 13 | 0 | 1 | 0 | – | | – | | 14 | 0 |
| Crotone | 2011–12 | 35 | 0 | 1 | 0 | – | | – | | 36 | 0 |
| Crotone | 2012–13 | 10 | 0 | 1 | 0 | – | | – | | 11 | 0 |
| Crotone | Total | 58 | 0 | 3 | 0 | – | | – | | 61 | 0 |
| Vitória Guimarães | 2013–14 | 12 | 0 | 2 | 0 | 1 | 0 | 4 | 0 | 19 | 0 |
| Vitória Guimarães | 2015–16 | 2 | 0 | 0 | 0 | 0 | 0 | 1 | 0 | 3 | 0 |
| Vitória Guimarães | Total | 14 | 0 | 2 | 0 | 1 | 0 | 5 | 0 | 22 | 0 |
| Vitória Guimarães B | 2013–14 | 3 | 0 | – | | | | | | 3 | 0 |
| Vitória Guimarães B | 2015–16 | 6 | 0 | – | | | | | | 6 | 0 |
| Vitória Guimarães B | Total | 9 | 0 | – | | | | | | 9 | 0 |
| Career total | | 156 | 1 | 9 | 0 | 6 | 0 | 5 | 0 | 176 | 1 |

== Honours ==
Vitória Guimarães

- Supertaça Cândido de Oliveira runner-up: 2013

Portugal U17

- UEFA European Under-17 Championship third place: 2004
