= Everson Junior =

French footballer (born 2001)

Personal information
- Full name: Everson Junior Pereira da Silva
- Date of birth: 7 November 2003 (age 23)
- Place of birth: Nice, France
- Height: 1.82 m (6 ft 0 in)
- Position: Defensive midfielder

Team information
- Current team: Montpellier
- Number: 77

Youth career
- Nice
- 2018–2021: Ajaccio

Senior career*
Years	Team	Apps	(Gls)
2021–2025	Ajaccio II	41	(8)
2021–2025	Ajaccio	32	(2)
2025–	Montpellier	23	(1)
- * Club domestic league appearances and goals as of 11 May 2026

Everson Junior Pereira da Silva (born 7 November 2003) is a French professional footballer who plays as a defensive midfielder for Ligue 2 club Montpellier.

== Club career ==
A youth product of Nice, Everson Junior joined the youth academy of Ajaccio in 2018 where he finished his development. He made his senior and professional debut with Ajaccio in a 0– Ligue 2 tie with AJ Auxerre on 7 August 2021. On 8 August 2023, he signed his first professional contract with Ajaccio until 2026.

On 15 August 2025, Everson signed with Montpellier in Ligue 2.

== Personal life ==
Everson Junior is the son of the Brazilian retired footballer, also named Everson, and brother of Everton Pereira.
