= Filipe Anunciação =

Portuguese football manager and former player

Personal information
- Full name: Filipe Alexandre Dias Anunciação
- Date of birth: 27 May 1979 (age 47)
- Place of birth: Matosinhos, Portugal
- Height: 1.79 m (5 ft 10 in)
- Position: Midfielder

Youth career
- 1988–1998: Boavista

Senior career*
Years	Team	Apps	(Gls)
1998–1999	Feirense	25	(0)
1999–2001	Paços Ferreira	29	(0)
2001–2003	Aves	45	(6)
2003–2006	Boavista	34	(1)
2004–2005	→ Moreirense (loan)	22	(1)
2005–2006	→ Aves (loan)	27	(6)
2006–2007	Aves	27	(3)
2007–2014	Paços Ferreira	153	(1)
Total		362	(18)

International career
1998–1999	Portugal U20	10	(0)
2001	Portugal U21	1	(0)

Managerial career
- 2014–2018: Paços Ferreira (assistant)
- 2018–2019: Marítimo (assistant)
- 2019–2021: B-SAD (assistant)
- 2023–2024: Pyramids (assistant)
- * Club domestic league appearances and goals

Filipe Alexandre Dias Anunciação (born 27 May 1979) is a Portuguese former professional footballer who played as a midfielder.

== Club career ==
Anunciação was born in Matosinhos. During his early career he played mostly in the Segunda Liga, where he represented C.D. Feirense, F.C. Paços de Ferreira, C.D. Aves, Boavista F.C. and Moreirense FC.

In 2007, Anunciação returned to Paços for a second spell, going on to spend several seasons in the Primeira Liga, mainly as a starter. Towards the end of his career, in the 2012–13 campaign, the 33-year-old still appeared in 17 games – four starts, 464 minutes – as the team finished a best-ever third and qualified for the UEFA Champions League; he was also their undisputed captain when available.

Anunciação retired in November 2014, being immediately appointed his main club's assistant coach. He amassed top-flight totals of 244 matches and six goals over the course of 13 seasons.
