= Paulo Jorge (footballer, born 1981) =

Portuguese footballer

Personal information
- Full name: Paulo Jorge Vieira Alves
- Date of birth: 5 May 1981 (age 45)
- Place of birth: Maia, Portugal
- Height: 1.76 m (5 ft 9 1/2 in)
- Position: Midfielder

Youth career
- 1994–1995: Folgosa Maia
- 1995–1999: Maia

Senior career*
Years	Team	Apps	(Gls)
1999–2005	Maia	61	(7)
2000–2002	→ Pedrouços (loan)		
2002–2003	→ Infesta (loan)	33	(2)
2005–2006	Boavista	25	(4)
2006–2007	Benfica	14	(1)
2007–2008	→ Málaga (loan)	32	(1)
2008–2010	Marítimo	52	(1)
2010–2012	Ittihad	37	(7)
2013	Gil Vicente	8	(0)
2013–2014	Belenenses	4	(0)
Total		266	(23)
- * Club domestic league appearances and goals

Paulo Jorge Vieira Alves (born 5 May 1981), known as Paulo Jorge, is a Portuguese former professional footballer who played mainly as a right midfielder.

He amassed Primeira Liga seasons of 103 games and six goals over six seasons, representing in the competition Boavista, Benfica, Marítimo, Gil Vicente and Belenenses. He also played in Spain and Saudi Arabia.

== Club career ==
=== Early career and Boavista ===
Paulo Jorge was born in Maia, Porto District. He spent six seasons in the Segunda Liga with his hometown club F.C. Maia, including loan spells in the lower leagues with Pedrouços A.C. and F.C. Infesta, then signed a three-year contract with Boavista F.C. for 2005–06. In his one year at the Estádio do Bessa, he scored seven goals in all competitions, including the equaliser in a 1–1 home derby draw against FC Porto on the final day; the team needed a win to qualify for the UEFA Cup.

=== Benfica ===
Paulo Jorge joined S.L. Benfica in July 2006, on a four-year deal for an undisclosed fee. With the Lisbon side, he started in UEFA Champions League matches against FK Austria Wien (both legs of the third qualifying round) and F.C. Copenhagen and Manchester United (group stage). His only goal came on 1 October, opening a 4–1 home win over C.D. Aves.

However, after having appeared sparingly during the league campaign, Paulo Jorge was loaned to Málaga CF in Spain, whom achieved La Liga promotion in 2008. He shared teams with compatriots Eliseu and Hélder Rosário during his stint, scoring once for the Andalusians to open an eventual 2–1 home loss to Gimnàstic de Tarragona on 10 May 2008.

=== Later career ===
Paulo Jorge was definitely sold in mid-July 2008, and joined C.S. Marítimo on a two-year deal, alongside Manú and João Coimbra who also transferred from the Estádio da Luz. He scored his first competitive goal for the Madeirans on 4 January 2009 during a 4–1 home victory over F.C. Paços de Ferreira, and spent most of the season as a right-back.

In June 2010, Paulo Jorge and former Benfica teammate Nuno Assis joined Al-Ittihad Club (Jeddah) of the Saudi Pro League, under their compatriot manager Manuel José. At the start of 2013, he returned to his country's top flight, being signed by Paulo Alves at Gil Vicente FC.

Remaining in the same league, Paulo Jorge agreed to a one-year contract at C.F. Os Belenenses in July 2013. After seven games, he was released by mutual consent on 15 January.
