= Alex von Schwedler =

Chilean footballer (born 1980)

Personal information
- Full name: Alex Cristian von Schwedler Vásquez
- Date of birth: 17 February 1980 (age 46)
- Place of birth: Santiago, Chile
- Height: 1.86 m (6 ft 1 in)
- Position: Centre back

Youth career
- 1994–1998: Universidad de Chile

Senior career*
Years	Team	Apps	(Gls)
1998–2002	Universidad de Chile	90	(5)
2002–2005	Bari	28	(0)
2004	→ Pasching (loan)	2	(0)
2005–2006	Red Bull Salzburg	6	(0)
2006–2007	Marítimo	15	(1)
2007–2008	Alki Larnaca	23	(0)
2008–2009	Belenenses	9	(0)
2009	Colo-Colo	0	(0)
2010–2014	Everton	97	(8)
Total		270	(14)

International career
2000–2007	Chile	4	(0)
2001	Chile B	1	(0)
- * Club domestic league appearances and goals

Alex Cristian von Schwedler Vásquez (born 17 February 1980) is a Chilean former footballer who played as a centre-back. He was a four-time Chilean international.

== Club career ==
=== Early career ===
Born in Santiago, Von Schwedler started his senior career at Universidad de Chile and he debuted for the club in 1998, aged 18. In 1999, Von Schwedler won his first league title and he was confirmed as defender in the. In the 2000 season, he was a key player under the squad of the coach César Vaccia, won his second league title and one Copa Chile.

His good seasons with the Universidad de Chile made the Italian side AS Bari notice him and shortly after being linked with the Serie B club. On 31 January 2003, Von Schwedler signed for Bari, joining his countrymen Jaime Valdés and Nicolás Córdova. He was a key player in the club, being in the starting lineup in many occasions. However, he joined SV Austria Salzburg on loan, and then moved to Red Bull Salzburg.

=== Portugal ===
During the summer of 2006, it was announced that Von Schwedler had joined CS Marítimo of the Portuguese Liga. On 22 October 2006, he made his Marítimo debut against SC Beira-Mar, playing the full 90 minutes. In his second match for the club, he scored his first for the club in the 4–1 victory against SC Braga, in the same match, he received a red card. On 25 December 2006, he scored the only (own) goal in a 1–0 away loss against Benfica at the Estádio da Luz. In June 2007, Von Schwedler left the club and signed for Alki Larnaca of the Cypriot First Division.

After one season in Cyprus, Von Schwedler returned to Portugal signing for CF Os Belenenses for the 2008–09 season. He made his Belenenses debut against Sporting Lisboa on 20 September 2009. He played only a few times and he was released from the club at the end of the season.

=== Colo-Colo ===
On 14 October 2009, after passing a medical, Von Schewdler joined Colo-Colo signing a contract until the end of the Torneo de Clausura in a free transfer. He joined the club because of the injury to the defender Miguel Riffo and he wears the number 33 shirt, due to the other numbers being in use by many players.

Von Schwedler made his Colo-Colo debut against Santiago Wanderers in a friendly match at Estadio Regional Chiledeportes as a 45th-minute substitute. When he entered to the field, he was booed by the supporters of Colo-Colo, because his pass for the club's archrival Universidad de Chile. He appeared on the bench on a few occasions and he did not play any matches. However, he proclaimed champion of the Torneo de Clausura. In December 2009, he was released from the club.

=== Everton ===
After several months without playing football, von Schwedler moved to Real España of the Honduran First División on 7 July 2010. However, one day later, Von Schwedler had a deal with Everton de Viña del Mar, joining that club, announcing that will not play for Real España.

On 17 July 2010, he debuted for Everton against Audax Italiano in a 2–0 loss. On 24 July, in his second match for the club, he scored his first goal for the club against Universidad Católica in a 1–1 draw at Estadio Sausalito, in the same game also received a red card. After the departure of Nelson Acosta, unfortunately the team was relegated to the second division. On 5 March 2011, von Schwedler scored his first goal in the Primera B in a 4–0 home win to Antofagasta.

== International career ==
Alex von Schwedler played on four occasions for the Chile national football team. On 24 March 2007, he played his last game for Chile that was against Brazil in a 4–0 loss at Ullevi Stadium in Sweden. In this match, he committed a penalty on Lúcio in the 15th minute, receiving a yellow card, finally this penalty was scored by Ronaldinho, he finish being replaced by Reinaldo Navia in the 46th minute. In addition, he made an appearance for Chile B in the friendly match against Catalonia on 28 December 2001.

== Honours ==
=== Club ===
Universidad de Chile

- Primera División de Chile (2): 1999, 2000
- Copa Chile (1): 2000

Colo-Colo

- Primera División de Chile (1): 2009 Apertura
