= Van Bommel =

Van Bommel is a Dutch toponymic surname meaning "from/of Bommel", the historical name of the city of Zaltbommel. People with the surname include:

- Cornelius Richard Anton van Bommel (1790–1852), Dutch bishop of Liège
- Elias Pieter van Bommel (1819–1890), Dutch city- and landscape painter
- Harry van Bommel (born 1962), Dutch Socialist Party politician
- Maria Van Bommel, Canadian (Ontario) politician
- Mark van Bommel (born 1977), Dutch former football midfielder
- Nelly van Bommel, French choreographer
- Lambertus van Bommel, Dutch painter/aquarellist
- Floris van Bommel, Dutch shoe designer

== See also ==
- Museum van Bommel van Dam
