= Marco Ferreira (footballer) =

Portuguese footballer

Personal information
- Full name: Marco Júlio Castanheira Afonso Alves Ferreira
- Date of birth: 12 March 1978 (age 48)
- Place of birth: Vimioso, Portugal
- Height: 1.77 m (5 ft 10 in)
- Position: Winger

Youth career
- 1988–1989: GD Parada
- 1989–1992: Bragança
- 1994–1996: Águia Vimioso

Senior career*
| Years | Team | Apps | (Gls) |
| 1996–1997 | Tirsense | 17 | (2) |
| 1997 | Atlético Madrid B | 4 | (0) |
| 1998 | Yokohama Flügels | | |
| 1998–1999 | Paços Ferreira | 19 | (0) |
| 1999–2002 | Vitória Setúbal | 89 | (14) |
| 2003–2005 | Porto | 23 | (3) |
| 2004–2005 | → Vitória Guimarães (loan) | 21 | (3) |
| 2005 | → Penafiel (loan) | 7 | (1) |
| 2006–2008 | Benfica | 5 | (0) |
| 2007 | → Leicester City (loan) | 0 | (0) |
| 2008 | → Belenenses (loan) | 6 | (0) |
| 2008–2010 | Ethnikos Piraeus | 32 | (5) |
| Total | | 223 | (28) |

International career
| 2002 | Portugal | 3 | (0) |
- * Club domestic league appearances and goals

Marco Júlio Castanheira Afonso Alves Ferreira (born 12 March 1978) is a Portuguese former professional footballer who played as a winger.

He amassed Primeira Liga totals of 127 games and 15 goals over the course of eight seasons, representing mainly in the competition Vitória de Setúbal and Porto. He also played in Spain, Japan, England and Greece.

== Club career ==
Ferreira was born in Vimioso in the Bragança District, and started his career at F.C. Tirsense in the Segunda Liga. In 1998 he moved to Atlético Madrid B, but only lasted a few months in Spain, finishing the season at Yokohama Flügels in the J1 League.

Ferreira would go on to represent F.C. Paços de Ferreira – also in the Portuguese second division – spending the following three and a half seasons as a key player at Primeira Liga club Vitória de Setúbal. In January 2003 he joined FC Porto, being part of the José Mourinho-led squad that defeated Celtic in the final of the 2002–03 UEFA Cup, coming on for Capucho in the 98th minute. He also featured in several UEFA Champions League games in the following campaign but was not selected for the decisive match, and added two consecutive league championships during his tenure with the northerners.

After that, Ferreira was loaned to Vitória de Guimarães for 2004–05. He made the same move the following year, now to F.C. Penafiel, but was released in January 2006 and promptly signed for S.L. Benfica, until June 2009; while in Lisbon, he was unable to establish himself as a first-team player, and was placed on the transfer list.

On 31 August 2007, Ferreira joined English side Leicester City on loan until the end of the year, but his contract was terminated in December after he became unsettled, making no competitive appearances (he was an unused substitute in a 3–2 away win over Nottingham Forest in the second round of the League Cup on 18 September). He finished the season with C.F. Os Belenenses, where he was coached by his former Setúbal manager Jorge Jesus.

Ferreira signed with Ethnikos Piraeus F.C. in August 2008. He spent 18 months at the Greek second division club, being released and retiring at the age of 32; it was also in this country where he met his second wife, Athina.

== International career ==
Ferreira's debut for Portugal came in a 1–1 friendly draw against Tunisia on 12 October 2002, playing six minutes after taking the place of Luís Figo. He went on to earn a further two caps that year.

== Honours ==
Porto

- Primeira Liga: 2002–03, 2003–04
- Taça de Portugal: 2002–03
- Supertaça Cândido de Oliveira: 2003
- UEFA Champions League: 2003–04
- UEFA Cup: 2002–03
