= Alcides (footballer) =

Brazilian footballer (born 1985)

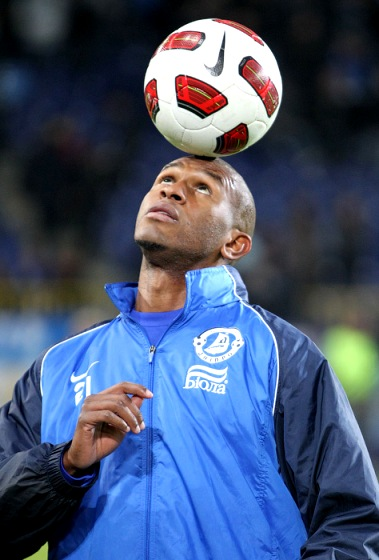
- Alcides with Dnipro in 2010

Personal information
- Full name: Alcides Eduardo Mendes de Araújo Alves
- Date of birth: 13 March 1985 (age 41)
- Place of birth: São José do Rio Preto, Brazil
- Height: 1.90 m (6 ft 3 in)
- Position: Defender

Youth career
- Vitória

Senior career*
Years	Team	Apps	(Gls)
2002–2003	Vitória	8	(0)
2003	Schalke 04	6	(0)
2004	Santos	2	(0)
2004–2008	Chelsea	0	(0)
2004–2006	→ Benfica (loan)	20	(0)
2007–2008	→ PSV (loan)	30	(2)
2008–2012	Dnipro Dnipropetrovsk	17	(0)
2013	Náutico	3	(0)
2014–2016	Ferroviária	22	(3)
2014	→ Atlético Paranaense (loan)	0	(0)
2014	→ Criciúma (loan)	2	(0)
2017	Matonense	10	(1)
Total		120	(6)

International career
2003	Brazil U20	7	(0)
- * Club domestic league appearances and goals as of 9 February 2016

Alcides Eduardo Mendes de Araújo Alves (born 13 March 1985), known simply as Alcides, is a Brazilian former professional footballer who played as either a right back or a central defender.

== Club career ==
Born in São José do Rio Preto, São Paulo, and a product of Salvador da Bahia-based Esporte Clube Vitória's youth system, Alcides had a short loan spell with FC Schalke 04 in Germany still in his teens. After a quick stint with Santos FC in his country, he returned the following season to Europe and signed with S.L. Benfica in Portugal, playing seven times as Benfica won the league after an 11-year wait; at this time, he was already owned by Chelsea, which he never represented.

In January 2007 Alcides moved to PSV Eindhoven, going on to work with former Benfica boss Ronald Koeman, who said of him: "He [Alcides] is an extra re-inforcement for the defence and he can play in several positions at the back. He is tall, very thin and extremely fast." On 3 February he played his first Eredivisie match for the club, against AZ Alkmaar. During his one half season-spell he helped the side to back-to-back national championships, appearing in 21 league games in the 2007–08 campaign (one goal) inclusively as a left back.

On 9 August 2008, Alcides signed with Ukraine's FC Dnipro Dnipropetrovsk.

== International career ==
Alcides helped Brazil win the 2003 FIFA World Youth Championship, in the United Arab Emirates, appearing in all the matches.

== Personal life ==
Alcides was kidnapped in Brazil, but was released after he convinced his abductors he was not a football player.

== See also ==
- List of kidnappings

== Honours ==
=== Club ===
Schalke 04

- UEFA Intertoto Cup: 2003

Benfica

- Primeira Liga: 2004–05
- Taça de Portugal: Runner-up 2004–05

PSV

- Eredivisie: 2006–07, 2007–08
- Johan Cruijff Shield: Runner-up 2007

Brazil U-20

- FIFA U-20 World Cup: 2003
