= Mantorras =

Angolan footballer (born 1982)

Personal information
- Full name: Pedro Manuel Torres
- Date of birth: 18 March 1982 (age 44)
- Place of birth: Huambo, Angola
- Height: 1.78 m (5 ft 10 in)
- Position: Striker

Youth career
- 1999: Progresso

Senior career*
Years	Team	Apps	(Gls)
1999–2001	Alverca	31	(9)
2001–2011	Benfica	101	(29)
Total		132	(38)

International career
2001	Angola U20	4	(1)
2001–2010	Angola	33	(5)
- * Club domestic league appearances and goals

Pedro Manuel Torres (born 18 March 1982), known as Mantorras, is an Angolan former professional footballer who played as a striker.

His nickname derives from the fact that, as a child, he suffered slight accidental burns, being then known as "Mantorras" from the Angolan expression "Mano Torras," which means "toasted brother". His professional career, mainly spent with Benfica, was blighted by constant injury problems which cause him to retire at just 30 years old.

Mantorras played for Angola in the 2000s, representing the nation at the 2006 World Cup and two Africa Cup of Nations tournaments.

== Club career ==
Born in Huambo, Mantorras started his career at Progresso Associação do Sambizanga. He quickly caught the eye of Portuguese scouts, and transferred to F.C. Alverca shortly thereafter as that club acted also as S.L. Benfica's farm team. Most notably, he scored once in a 3–1 home win over Sporting Clube de Portugal on 17 February 2001, and finished that season with nine league goals as the team managed to retain their Primeira Liga status, finishing in 12th position.

At 19, Mantorras signed with Benfica, making a particularly good impression during his first season and being subsequently sought out by FC Barcelona and Inter Milan. During his quick rise to stardom, he was frequently described as the best player to come out of Portuguese Africa since Eusébio left Mozambique for Benfica in the early 1960s; the latter himself said of the former: "He has special qualities and is set for a great future".

In 2002, Mantorras suffered a serious knee injury that almost put an end to his short career. He spent approximately two-and-a-half years recovering, during which he was subject to four surgical procedures. He returned to the pitch during the 2004–05 campaign, and managed to contribute sufficiently as Benfica ended an 11-year drought and won the national championship, with five goals in only 15 matches (four of those in the final two months).

Even though he was subsequently deemed to be fully recovered, Mantorras failed to re-establish himself as a first-team player, playing only in a few games throughout the next seasons combined. However, he remained a fan favourite, additionally stating he would like to see out his career at the club and that he would remain there even if he was not paid a salary.

Benfica won the league again in 2009–10, as well as the domestic league cup, also reaching the last eight in the UEFA Europa League, but Mantorras' output consisted of ten minutes during the pre-season, in a 2–1 loss against Atlético Madrid; in mid-February 2011, one month shy of his 29th birthday, he announced his retirement from professional football, making a short and unsuccessful comeback with C.D. Primeiro de Agosto later on.

In June 2012, Mantorras returned to Benfica as club ambassador. The following month, on the 18th, he received a testimonial match at the Estádio da Luz, facing an All-Star team which included Luís Figo, Edgar Davids, Luís Boa Morte, Teddy Sheringham, Dwight Yorke, Paulo Futre, Ronaldo, Francesco Toldo, Fabio Cannavaro, Fernando Couto, Míchel Salgado, Serginho, Pauleta, Juliano Belletti and Mateja Kežman, and netting the fourth goal in a 5–1 win; after the match he praised the club fans in an interview, and dedicated his goal to them for all the support he received during his spell. His former manager Jorge Jesus praised his efforts, as well as the money raised in the game by both teams.

== International career ==
Mantorras represented Angola at the 2001 FIFA World Youth Championship, in Argentina. He scored in a 1–1 group stage draw against Australia, helping his country eventually reach the round-of-16.

A full international since the age of 19, Mantorras was part of the national team which became the first ever African Portuguese-speaking country to qualify for the FIFA World Cup, in 2006. There, he played twice from the bench, including in the 0–1 group stage loss against Portugal.

Even though he was only fifth or sixth-choice at Benfica at the time, Mantorras was also summoned for the 2010 Africa Cup of Nations, played on home soil. As Angola reached the last-eight he only appeared once, again as a substitute, in a 2–0 win over Malawi.

== Personal life ==
Soon after joining Benfica, Mantorras promised to donate a large percentage of his wages to set up a home for street children in Luanda. He related their plight to his own experiences: "My father died when I was three months old and my mother when I was 16. I had a brother to look after and became the head of the family [when I was] very young. I had a lot of difficulties early in my life. Now that my fortunes have improved, I'm going to do what I can to help the underprivileged".

== Career statistics ==
=== Club ===
Appearances and goals by club, season and competition
Club	Season	League		National cup		League cup		Europe		Total	
Club	Season	Apps	Goals	Apps	Goals	Apps	Goals	Apps	Goals	Apps	Goals
Alverca	1999–2000	5	0	1	0	–		–		6	0
Alverca	2000–01	26	9	2	0	–		–		28	9
Alverca	Total	31	9	3	0	–		–		34	9
Benfica	2001–02	30	13	3	0	–		–		33	13
Benfica	2002–03	8	3	1	0	–		0	0	9	3
Benfica	2003–04	–									
Benfica	2004–05	15	5	1	0	–		2	0	18	5
Benfica	2005–06	17	3	2	0	–		5	0	24	3
Benfica	2006–07	17	2	3	1	–		5	0	25	3
Benfica	2007–08	9	1	2	0	1	0	2	1	14	2
Benfica	2008–09	5	2	0	0	0	0	0	0	5	2
Benfica	2009–10	0	0	1	0	0	0	0	0	1	0
Benfica	2010–11	0	0	0	0	0	0	0	0	0	0
Benfica	Total	101	29	13	1	1	0	14	1	129	31
Career total		132	38	16	1	1	0	14	1	163	40

=== International ===
Appearances and goals by national team and year
National team	Year	Apps	Goals
Angola	2001	2	0
Angola	2002	2	0
Angola	2003	0	0
Angola	2004	0	0
Angola	2005	4	2
Angola	2006	9	1
Angola	2007	3	1
Angola	2008	3	1
Angola	2009	8	0
Angola	2010	2	0
Total		33	5

Scores and results list Angola's goal tally first, score column indicates score after each Mantorras goal.

List of international goals scored by Mantorras
No.	Date	Venue	Opponent	Score	Result	Competition
1	17 August 2005	Estádio José Gomes, Amadora, Portugal	Cape Verde	1–1	2–1	Friendly
2	4 September 2005	Estádio da Cidadela, Luanda, Angola	Gabon	2–0	3–0	2006 World Cup qualification
3	17 January 2006	Prince Moulay Abdellah Stadium, Rabat, Morocco	Morocco	2–2	2–2	Friendly
4	25 March 2007	Estádio da Cidadela, Luanda, Angola	Eritrea	2–0	6–1	2008 Africa Cup of Nations qualification
5	14 June 2008	Mandela National Stadium, Kampala, Uganda	Uganda	1–3	1–3	2010 World Cup qualification

== Honours ==
Benfica

- Primeira Liga: 2004–05
- Supertaça Cândido de Oliveira: 2005; runner-up: 2004
- Taça de Portugal: 2003–04; runner-up: 2004–05

International

- African Youth Championship: 2001

'Individual

- CAF Young Player: 2001
