= 2003–04 S.L. Benfica season =

Benfica
2003–04 season
- President: Manuel Vilarinho (until 2 November 2003); Luís Filipe Vieira
- Head coach: José Antonio Camacho
- Stadium: Estádio Nacional (until 19 October 2003); Estádio da Luz
- Primeira Liga: 2nd
- Taça de Portugal: Winners
- UEFA Champions League: Third qualifying round
- UEFA Cup: Fourth round
- Top goalscorer: League: Simão (12); All: Simão (15)
- Highest home attendance: 65,000 v Sporting CP (4 January 2004)
- Lowest home attendance: 8,000 v Vitória de Guimarães (23 August 2003)
- Biggest win: 3 goal difference in 5 matches
- Biggest defeat: 2 goal difference in 3 matches
Home colours	Away colours

The 2003–04 season was Sport Lisboa e Benfica's 100th season in existence and the club's 70th consecutive season in the top flight of Portuguese football. It ran from 1 July 2003 to 30 June 2004. Benfica competed domestically in the Primeira Liga and the Taça de Portugal. The club also participated in the UEFA Champions League as a result of finishing second in the Primeira Liga in the previous season.

After José Antonio Camacho led Benfica to second place, the club offered him a new two-year contract as manager in June. As a condition to renewing the contract, Camacho requested that the club sign more established players, but budget restraints allowed for limited investment. After several unsuccessful player bids, Benfica added Luisão to the squad and re-signed Geovanni in August. Because their second-place finish only granted a berth in the third qualifying round of the UEFA Champions League, Benfica had to play Lazio for a spot in the group stage. They lost both legs and were relegated to the UEFA Cup.

Domestically, Benfica began the league campaign with five points in four games, losing ground in the league race. They improved in subsequent games, but dropped points two more times, including at the official opening of the new Estádio da Luz. January was a difficult month for Benfica as they lost the Lisbon derby with Sporting, and on 25 January witnessed the death of club player—Miklós Fehér—in the middle of a game. In February and March, the team fluctuated between winning and losing streaks, including knocking out Rosenborg and losing to Inter Milan in the UEFA Cup.

In the final two months, Benfica unexpectedly recovered six points against Sporting, overtaking them to finish second and qualify for the 2004–05 UEFA Champions League. The club also reached the Portuguese Cup final for the first time in seven years. Benfica beat Porto in extra-time to win their 24th Cup, which they dedicated to Fehér.

== Season summary ==
=== Pre-season ===
In the aftermath of their best league finish since 1997–98, Benfica negotiated a one-year extension to Camacho's contract, which had been set to expire on 30 June. As a condition to agreeing to stay, he wanted several problems related to the technical staff, training fields and signings to be solved. On 23 June, Camacho agreed to remain as manager, with Pepe Carcelén and Álvaro Magalhães assisting him. In his presentation, he confessed that the club's limited finances would make it harder to sign players; he also said that Benfica would give their best but did not expect to dethrone Porto. Benfica inquired after Helton, and Ricardo to compete with José Moreira for the goalkeeper position. Over the course of two weeks, the club negotiated unsuccessfully with the latter and ultimately chose to stay with Moreira. The club also looked into strengthen their options at centre and at left-back, negotiating unsuccessfully with Ânderson Polga, Atouba and Júnior. Despite these failed negotiations, Benfica added Luisão, and re-signed Geovanni; both would be regular starters throughout the season.

With Portugal in seventh place in the UEFA coefficient and because only the first six had their league runner-up drawn directly into the group stage of the UEFA Champions League, Benfica had to go through a qualifying round, and were paired with Lazio on the draw of 26 July. The first match was scheduled for 13 August at Stadio Olimpico and the return leg, on the 26 August, at the Estádio do Bessa, due to Estádio Nacional's inability to receive European games. The team began their season preparations on 5 July, with two days reserved for medicals. After a week and a half of training sessions on Jerez de la Frontera, they travelled to Nyon on 16 July, for a seven-day tour. In Switzerland, they played Panathinaikos and Sporting, with different results, a loss with the Greeks and a win with Sporting. Back in Portugal, Benfica competed in two tournaments, first at the Guadiana Trophy with Belenenses, and later at the Centenarian Trophy with Boavista and Leixões. The team ended their pre-season with a match against Moreirense. Although Camacho initially doubted the team's chances in the title race, in August he said that the team "was stronger than last year, due to the added time together", and that they would fight for the title.

=== August–September ===
Benfica played their first competitive game of the season against Lazio in Rome and lost 3–1. This reduced their hopes of reaching the group stage of the Champions League, as Camacho said: "Lazio were supposed to do more tonight to win this game. Benfica helped them by committing some mistakes, mainly due to our lack of experience. We have complicated our lives in view of the second-leg match.". The third goal from Lazio, scored by Mihajlović, came from a Roger's foul after touching the ball with his hands; Camacho openly criticized Roger for the incident. On the 17th, Benfica began their league campaign away to Boavista. Their last win there was on 30 March 1996, eight seasons ago. The game ended as a goalless draw, with Camacho criticizing the referee for the excessive number of interruptions. On the following Saturday, Benfica defeated Vitória de Guimarães at home, in a 2–0 win, which Camacho admitted to be flattering in comparison with the team performance. Two days later, the club announced they were postponing their third match day from 31 August to 29 October, because of Académica's desire to play that game at the newly renovated Estádio Cidade de Coimbra. On the 27th, Benfica lost one-nil to Lazio, and were knocked out of the Champions League. Because of the financial loss from the elimination, the club was unable to invest further in squad; the team closed the transfer window with only Alex and Luisão as new signings.

Benfica's first match in September was on the 14th against Belenenses. Despite leading the game with 90 minutes played, Benfica allowed the visitors to score two goals in extra time to draw the match 3–3. Camacho took responsibility for the goals in extra-time, admitting the team needed to be smarter and waste time. The next match was the Clássico away on the 21st; Porto had a five-point lead in the league table, although Benfica had played one less game. Porto won 2–0. Camacho complained of bad luck: "What happened was that one team entered the game to dominate, achieved some control, but it was the other team who scored. What matters in football is goals, and Porto scored, while we did not." Three days later, Benfica started their UEFA Cup campaign against La Louvière, a Belgian team that António Simões described as "easy". The game ended in a 1–1 draw, with Camacho dismissing the idea that it was a bad result, saying that an away draw in a European competition was still a satisfying outcome. On the 28th, Benfica closed the month with a home win against Nacional, with Tiago scoring the only goal. Despite the fans whistling the team, Camacho was pleased with the performance, noting the opportunities the team had to double the lead.

=== October–November ===
The first match in October was on the 4th; it was an away match at Parque de Jogos, Moreirense's home ground. Benfica won 4–1, which was their largest win all season. Camacho attributed the team's success to an improvement in the conversion rate of the attacking line. After a break for international matches, Benfica returned with the second leg of the UEFA Cup on the 15th. They dominated the match, and only a strong performance from Silvio Proto allowed the Belgians to leave with only a goal conceded. Two days later, Benfica announced they were rescheduling the game against Marítimo from 25 October to 12 November, due to the opening game of the new Estádio da Luz on the same day. On 19 October, Benfica ended their six-month spell at Estádio Nacional with a match against Gil Vicente. Benfica scored first but Gil Vicente equalized three minutes later, unsettling the home side. In the second half, Simão scored the winning goal for Benfica. Camacho acknowledged that Benfica struggled after conceding Gil Vicente's goal, adding that it was a normal behaviour in football. On the 25th, Benfica opened its brand new Estádio da Luz, attracting a sell-out crowd against Nacional Montevideo. Benfica won 2–1, with Nuno Gomes scoring twice. On the following Wednesday, Benfica opened the redeveloped Estádio Cidade de Coimbra, in a game transferred from August. Simão put on a man of the match performance, leading the team to a 3–1 win to Académica.

Benfica started November by hosting Beira-Mar on the 2nd in the official opening of their new stadium. Beira-Mar won 2–1, inflicting Benfica's second league defeat, which opened an 11-point gap to Porto. Camacho blamed the defeat on the lack of goal opportunities. Four days later, Benfica received Molde for the UEFA Cup, beating them 3–1 and assuring a two-goal lead for the second leg. Camacho recognized the team was struggling to defend against corner-kicks, as both Beira-Mar and Molde had scored in corners. On 9 November, the team visited Alverca and won three-nil, with two goals from Tiago and one from Geovanni. Camacho was pleased with the performance, but said that Benfica should have scored more. On 12 November, Benfica played Marítimo, in a fixture transferred from October. Weakened by injuries in some of the regular players, Benfica could not do better than a one-all draw. Camacho attributed the result to the excessive number of games in short amount of time, something most of the players were not accustomed to. After a 10-day international break, Benfica opened the Portuguese Cup campaign against Estrela da Amadora on the 22nd. They won 3–1 with all of the goals arriving late in the game. Benfica closed the month with a 2–0 win to Molde, on the second leg of the UEFA Cup, with Tiago again scoring twice.

=== December–January ===
On 1 December, Benfica won its first league match in their new stadium, beating Rio Ave by 2–0. After the match, Camacho defended his team to the press by saying "Eusébio's team is gone." A week later, the team defeated Paços de Ferreira away, with João Pereira scoring two goals. Because Porto had lost points, Benfica were now only six points from the top of the league. On the 13th, Benfica won their fifth match in a row, beating Braga at home. After the game, Camacho angrily refuted any idea that Benfica did not play accordingly to expectations: "A poor performance? That's not what I saw. In football there are two teams. Everyone knows that, against Benfica, all teams give their best, and we suffer that in the first half, because Braga played like every other team here. It is like the story of the bottle, for the optimist it is half full; for the pessimist, it is half empty." On the same day, they were drawn with Rosenborg in the upcoming round of the UEFA Cup. The following Wednesday, Benfica progressed through the fifth round of the Portuguese Cup, with Luisão scoring a single goal in an away win against Académica. The final game of the month came on the 21st, with a 3–0 win to Estrela da Amadora. Two goals within the first ten minutes allowed the team to comfortably manage the remaining time. Camacho later said that Benfica could have scored six or seven goals. This was the team's seventh win in a row, the longest streak of consecutive wins in Camacho's time at Benfica.

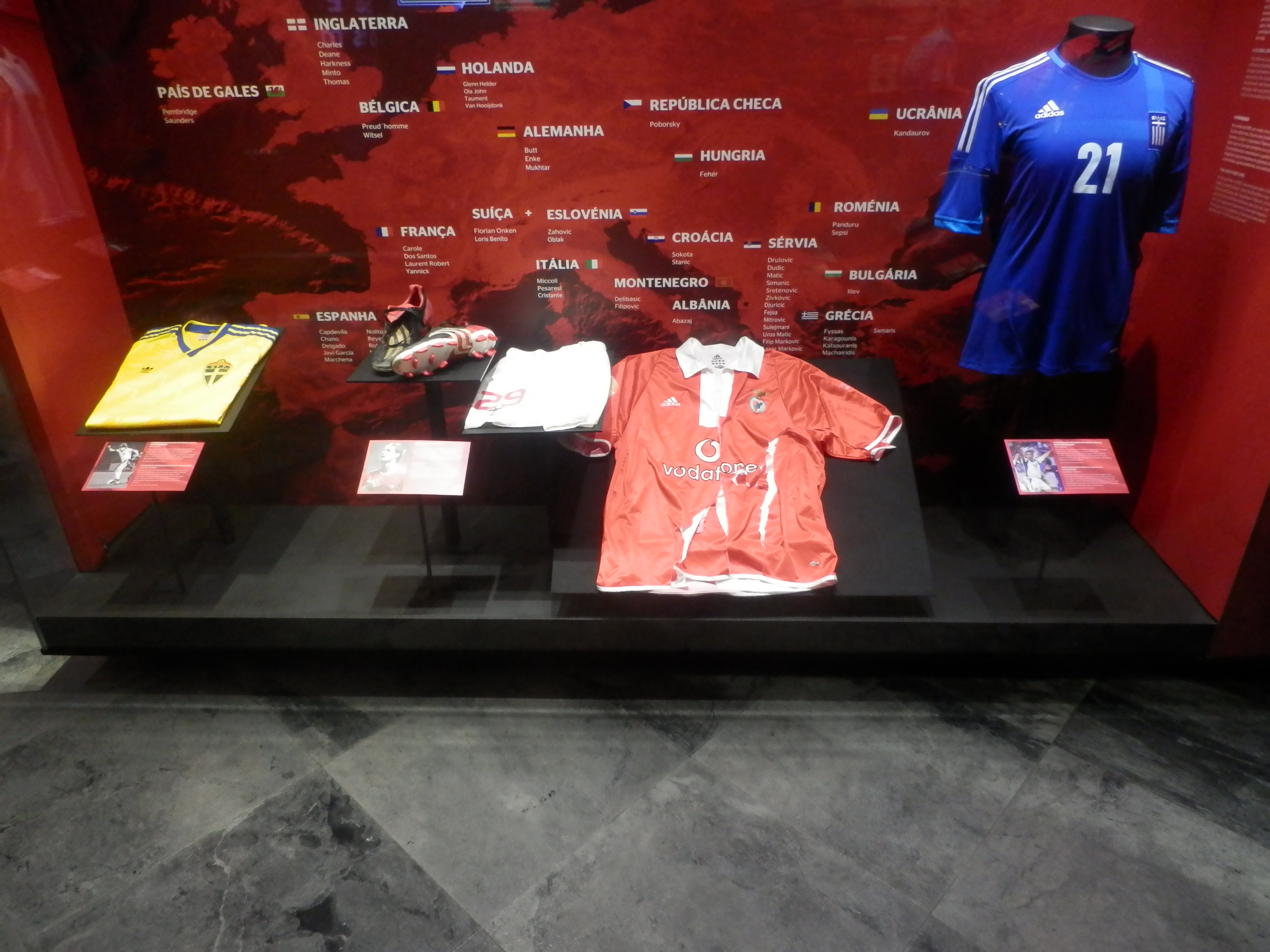
Miklós Fehér shirt showing the cuts done by the paramedics

2004 opened with a Lisbon derby against Sporting on 4 January. Benfica conceded an early goal, after Moreira fouled Silva inside the box. Sporting added a second before half-time and closed the match with another converted penalty; winning 3–1 and increasing their lead over Benfica to four points. On 11 January, Benfica visited União de Leiria at the newly developed Estádio Dr. Magalhães Pessoa. In a tightly contested match, Benfica fell behind twice and briefly led on the 80th minute. However, Leiria equalized within two minutes and the match ended in a 3–3 draw. With five points lost in two games, the distance to the top was again 11 points, with 6 to second place. The game also marked the debut of Takis Fyssas, a 30-year-old left-back hired to compete with Cristiano. A week later, Benfica beat Boavista 3–2 with two goals from Sokota. At the press conference, Camacho criticized the media's behaviour after two weeks of intense pressure due to previous results. On 25 January, Benfica closed the month with an away game at Vitória de Guimarães. They won the game with a late goal, but the match was more remembered for the collapse and later death of Miklós Fehér, who suffered a cardiac arrhythmia brought on by hypertrophic cardiomyopathy. The day after his death, Benfica announced they were permanently retiring his shirt number.

=== February–March ===
In the aftermath of Fehér's death, Benfica played at home to Académica on 3 February. Benfica scored first on the 27th minute with a goal from Zahovič, with Geovanni later making it 2–0. On the 8th, Benfica defeated Belenenses at Restelo, with two second half goals from Sokota and João Pereira. Camacho said the team had won the first of a cycle of three decisive matches. Three days later, Benfica played the quarter-finals of the Portuguese Cup against Nacional. After conceding on 22nd minute, the team spent over an hour trying to score. Tiago then scored in the 85th minute, with Sokota scoring Benfica's second a minute later. This put the team into the semi-final. On 15 February, Benfica received Porto for the second Clássico of the season. Porto scored first through Costinha, but Benfica levelled the match through Simão on the 50th minute, with the game ending in a 1–1 draw. Camacho expressed that the correct result should have been a win for Benfica, and that Porto had been lucky. A week later, Benfica met Nacional again, now on their home turf. After conceding an early goal, Benfica fought back to a 2–1 lead; only to allow Nacional to score two goals within two minutes and win the game. Because two goals had come from corner-kicks, Camacho was questioned if the centre-backs were at fault; which he answered: "We conceded three goals from set pieces, and that could not be the centre-backs' fault, because we defend them with 5 or 6 players – so they alone cannot be blamed." On the 26th, Benfica received Rosenborg in the UEFA Cup. While both teams had opportunities to open the score sheet in the first half, the winning goal arrived on the 61st minute when Zahovic released a powerful shot. The final game of February was on the 29th, with Benfica hosting Moreirense at Da Luz. Benfica scored first by Fernando Aguiar, but could not retain their lead and conceded a late goal from Demétrius. Although Sporting had a seven-point advantage, Camacho refused to admit defeat on the Champions League race, saying: "We have not lost the fight yet.".

Benfica played the second leg of the UEFA Cup third round on 3 March. At the Lerkendal Stadion, Rosenborg scored two goals inside the first 15 minutes, but Benfica regained their aggregate lead with a goal on the 19th minute. Despite playing with a man less in the second half, Moreira was not beaten again and Benfica went through to the next round on away goals. On the 7th, the team visited Gil Vicente's home stadium. Benfica scored first with Geovanni, but squandered two chances to make it 2–0. Instead Gil Vicente were able to equalize. Camacho substituted in Manuel Fernandes and the 17-year-old scored the winning-goal for Benfica. Camacho praised the players for maintaining their commitment after an exhausting European game. On the following Thursday, Benfica hosted Inter Milan in the UEFA Cup. The team had multiple chances against Toldo but could not beat him, with the match ending 0–0. On 14 March, Benfica played host to Marítimo, beating them 1–0 with a goal by Simão in the 81st minute. On the 17th, Benfica hosted Belenenses for the Portuguese Cup semi-final. With three goals scored in the first 36 minutes, Benfica managed the lead until the end. They qualified for their first final since 1997. On 21 March, Benfica visited the new Municipal de Aveiro to face the local team, Beira-Mar. With the team resting players for the game with Inter, Camacho brought in Nuno Gomes and the striker scored the winning goal with 15 minutes left to play. The win reduced the gap to Sporting to just 4 points. Four days later, Benfica and Inter Milan had an entertaining seven-goal thriller in the second leg of the UEFA Cup. At half-time, the teams were level, but in the 10 minutes between the 60th and 70th minute, Inter scored three to Benfica's one, opening a two-goal cushion. Benfica later reduced the lead to 4–3, but this was insufficient to prevent an elimination. Benfica closed March on the 28th. Two early goals allowed the team to cruise past Alverca, bringing their win tally to five wins in eight games.

=== April–May ===
Benfica opened April in Vila do Conde with an away match against Rio Ave on Sunday 4 April. The home team opened the scoring in the second half and six minutes later Benfica equalized by Tiago. The game ended with a 1–1 draw, with Camacho admitting the team showed signs of fatigue. This draw also allowed Sporting to regain a six-point lead, with just five match-days to go. On 10 April, Benfica played Paços de Ferreira at home. Nuno Gomes and Geovanni both scored in the second half to give Benfica a 2–1 win. A week later Benfica won their second game in a row, 3–0 away at Braga. Miguel scored his first of the season while Sokota and Simão made it 3–0 by the half-hour point. The win, Benfica's largest there since 1989-90, helped them reduce the gap to second place to three points, because of Sporting's loss to Boavista. Camacho attributed the easy win to his team's motivation. Benfica ended April with a home game against Estrela da Amadora. They took an early lead through Nuno Gomes and Sokota scored the second later in the first half. Davide reduced the lead on the 86th minute, but an additional goal by Miguel led to a 3–1 win that put Benfica in second place in the league table, after catching up to Sporting. Camacho liked the win but not the performance, saying: "We lacked sharpness and played on a slow pace." For the upcoming match with Sporting, Tiago commented that the Derby could go either way, but dismissed the idea that it was the most important game in the season for Benfica, saying: "The Portuguese Cup final is our most important game."

On 2 May, Benfica visited the new Estádio José Alvalade for a match that decided who would go to the 2004–05 UEFA Champions League. Sporting pressed hard from the start and dominated the first half, but Benfica managed to balance the game in the second, until they finally beat Sporting's defence with an 87th-minute goal. Rui Dias described the goal for Record: "It wasn't until the 87th minute that the game knew its man of the match: Geovanni; if the game was destined to be generic, the Brazilian added inspiration and scored a spectacular goal that decided the game and almost certainly sealed the unthinkable second place for Benfica – who could have thought of that only a month ago?." With the win, Benfica were only a point short of qualifying for the Champions League. Camacho praised the team, saying they had had a fantastic season. A week later, Benfica secured the second place in the league and the associated place in the third qualifying round of the Champions League with a 0–0 home draw against União de Leiria. Camacho later said: "We finished in second place, because we did not give up.". Benfica's last game of the season was the 2004 Taça de Portugal Final. In a highly competitive match, Porto took the lead through Derlei on the 45th minute, before Benfica equalized by Fyssas on the 58th minute. In extra-time, Simão scored the winner, sealing Benfica's 24th Portuguese Cup. It was the first trophy for the team since 1996, ending the club longest drought. Camacho complimented his team and dedicated the win to Fehér and Bruno Baião, the latter a youth team player who had died the day before, also from heart related complications. In the post-season, although Camacho said he was preparing for the following season, he chose to depart to Real Madrid on 24 May, as he signed a 2-year deal.

== Competitions ==
Win Draw Loss Postponed

=== Overall record ===
Competition	First match	Last match	Record								
Competition	First match	Last match	G	W	D	L	GF	GA	GD	Win %	Source
Primeira Liga	17 August 2003	9 May 2004	34	22	8	4	62	28	+34	64.71	
Taça de Portugal	22 November 2003	16 May 2004	5	5	0	0	11	4	+7	100.00	
UEFA Champions League	13 August 2003	27 August 2003	2	0	0	2	1	4	−3	0.00	
UEFA Cup	24 September 2003	25 March 2004	8	4	2	2	12	8	+4	50.00	
Total			49	31	10	8	86	44	+42	63.27	

=== Primeira Liga ===
==== League table ====
Pos	Team	Pld	W	D	L	GF	GA	GD	Pts	Qualification or relegation
1	Porto (C)	34	25	7	2	63	19	+44	82	Qualification to Champions League group stage
2	Benfica	34	22	8	4	62	28	+34	74	Qualification to Champions League third qualifying round
3	Sporting CP	34	23	4	7	60	33	+27	73	Qualification to UEFA Cup first round (Note: Maritimo qualified for the UEFA Cup because Benfica, the Portuguese Cup winners, qualified for the Champions League.)
4	Nacional	34	17	5	12	56	35	+21	56	Qualification to UEFA Cup first round
5	Braga	34	15	9	10	36	38	−2	54	Qualification to UEFA Cup first round

Source: Foradejogo
Rules for classification: 1) points; 2) head-to-head points; 3) head-to-head goal difference; 4) goal difference; 5) number of goals scored
(C) Champions

==== Results by round ====
Round	1	2	3	4	5	6	7	8	9	10	11	12	13	14	15	16	17	18	19	20	21	22	23	24	25	26	27	28	29	30	31	32	33	34
Ground	A	H	A	H	A	H	A	H	A	H	A	H	A	H	A	H	A	H	A	H	A	H	A	H	A	H	A	H	A	H	A	H	A	H
Result	D	W	W	D	L	W	W	W	D	L	W	W	W	W	W	L	D	W	W	W	W	D	L	D	W	W	W	W	D	W	W	W	W	D
Position	9	4	3	5	8	6	3	2	2	5	3	3	3	3	3	3	3	3	3	3	3	3	3	3	3	3	3	3	3	3	3	2	2	2

Source: ForaDeJogo.net
A = Away; H = Home; W = Win; D = Draw; L = Loss

==== Matches ====
17 August 2003 1	Boavista	0–0	Benfica	Porto
18:15		Report		Stadium: Estádio do Bessa; Referee: Carlos Xistra

23 August 2003 2	Benfica	2–0	Vitória Guimarães	Lisbon
20:00	Zahovič 44' (pen.); Fehér 80'	Report	Guga (red card) 43'	Stadium: Estádio Nacional; Attendance: 8,000; Referee: Pedro Henriques

31 August 2003 3	Académica	Postponed	Benfica	Coimbra
				Stadium: Estádio Cidade de Coimbra

14 September 2003 4	Benfica	3–3	Belenenses	Lisbon
18:15	João Pereira 27'; Fehér 54'; Luisão 87'	Report	Sané 82' (pen.), 90+1'; Leonardo 90+5'	Stadium: Estádio Nacional; Referee: Duarte Gomes

21 September 2003 5	Porto	2–0	Benfica	Porto
21:00	Derlei 30'; Argel 52' (o.g.)	Report	Ricardo Rocha (yellow card) 40' (yellow-red card) 78'	Stadium: Estádio das Antas; Attendance: 44,441; Referee: Lucílio Baptista

28 September 2003 6	Benfica	1–0	Nacional	Lisbon
19:15	Tiago 25' (yellow card) 23' (yellow-red card) 79'	Report	Goulart (red card) 40'	Stadium: Estádio Nacional; Attendance: 5,000; Referee: João Vilas Boas

4 October 2003 7	Moreirense	1–4	Benfica	Moreira de Cónegos
21:15	Vítor Pereira (red card) 55'; Armando (red card) 55'; Manoel 70'	Report	Simão 26', 55' (pen.); Fehér 45'; Roger 90+2'	Stadium: Parque Joaquim Almeida Freitas; Attendance: 5,000; Referee: João Ferreira

19 October 2003 8	Benfica	2–1	Gil Vicente	Lisbon
21:00	Šokota 28'; Simão 64'	Report	Ferreira 31'	Stadium: Estádio Nacional; Referee: 12,000

25 October 2003 9	Marítimo	Postponed	Benfica	Funchal
				Stadium: Estádio dos Barreiros

29 October 2003 3	Académica	1–3	Benfica	Coimbra
20:00	Tonel 6'	Report	Šokota 21'; Simão 27'; Roger 83'	Stadium: Estádio Cidade de Coimbra; Attendance: 22,500; Referee: Augusto Duarte

2 November 2003 10	Benfica	1–2	Beira-Mar	Lisbon
20:15	Simão 40'	Report	Sandro Gaúcho 53'; Wijnhard 64'	Stadium: Estádio da Luz; Attendance: 30,000; Referee: Carlos Xistra

9 November 2003 11	Alverca	0–3	Benfica	Lisbon
19:00		Report	Tiago 14', 82'; Geovanni 73'	Stadium: Complexo Desportivo FC Alverca; Attendance: 2,000; Referee: Paulo Paraty

12 November 2003 9	Marítimo	1–1	Benfica	Funchal
20:00	Dinda 64'	Report	Simão 82'	Stadium: Estádio dos Barreiros; Attendance: 8,000; Referee: Mário Mendes

1 December 2003 12	Benfica	2–0	Rio Ave	Lisbon
19:15	Simão 41' (pen.); Cristiano 68'	Report		Stadium: Estádio da Luz; Attendance: 26,375; Referee: Paulo Baptista

7 December 2003 13	Paços de Ferreira	0–3	Benfica	Paços de Ferreira
20:15		Report	João Pereira 27', 44'; F. Aguiar 64'	Stadium: Estádio da Mata Real; Attendance: 6,000; Referee: Olegário Benquerença

13 December 2003 14	Benfica	2–0	Braga	Lisbon
21:00	Simão 28'; Šokota 83'	Report	Artur Jorge Amorim (red card) 78'	Stadium: Estádio da Luz; Referee: Duarte Gomes

21 December 2003 15	Estrela da Amadora	0–3	Benfica	Lisbon
20:30	Rui Baião (red card) 90'	Report	Nuno Gomes 2'; Tiago 10'; Šokota 32'	Stadium: Estádio da Reboleira; Attendance: 7,000; Referee: Lucílio Baptista

4 January 2004 16	Benfica	1–3	Sporting	Lisbon
19:00	Miguel (yellow card) 47' (yellow-red card) 64'; Luisão 56'; Ricardo Rocha (yellow card) 47' (yellow-red card) 90'	Report	Rochemback 8' (pen.) (yellow card) 21' (yellow-red card) 42'; Silva 33'; Sá Pinto 90+2' (pen.)	Stadium: Estádio da Luz; Attendance: 65,000; Referee: Pedro Proença

11 January 2004 17	União de Leiria	3–3	Benfica	Leiria
19:15	Luís Filipe 19'; Douala 42', 82'	Report	Šokota 29'; Nuno Gomes 57', 79'	Stadium: Estádio Dr. Magalhães Pessoa; Attendance: 18,000; Referee: Paulo Costa

18 January 2004 18	Benfica	3–2	Boavista	Lisbon
19:45	Šokota 18', 67'; Argel 24'	Report	R. Sousa 29'; Anunciação 39'; Rui Óscar (yellow card) 11' (yellow-red card) 47'; Martelinho (yellow card) 58' (yellow-red card) 85'	Stadium: Estádio da Luz; Attendance: 26,398; Referee: Elmano Santos

25 January 2004 19	Vitória Guimarães	0–1	Benfica	Guimarães
19:45		Report	F. Aguiar 90+1'	Stadium: Estádio D. Afonso Henriques; Attendance: 13,015; Referee: Olegário Benquerença

3 February 2004 20	Benfica	2–0	Académica	Lisbon
21:15	Zahovič 27'; Geovanni 66'	Report		Stadium: Estádio da Luz; Attendance: 56,090; Referee: Martins dos Santos

8 February 2004 21	Belenenses	0–2	Benfica	Lisbon
19:45		Report	Šokota 53'; João Pereira 67'	Stadium: Estádio do Restelo; Attendance: 12,000; Referee: Pedro Henriques

15 February 2004 22	Benfica	1–1	Porto	Lisbon
20:00	Simão 50'	Report	Costinha 29'	Stadium: Estádio da Luz; Attendance: 57,000; Referee: João Ferreira

22 February 2004 23	Nacional	3–2	Benfica	Funchal
20:15	Adriano 10', 54'; Gouveia 56'	Report	Simão 31'; Nuno Gomes 51'	Stadium: Estádio da Madeira; Attendance: 3,000; Referee: Augusto Duarte

29 February 2004 24	Benfica	1–1	Moreirense	Lisbon
19:00	F. Aguiar 56'	Report	Demétrios 87' (yellow card) 78' (yellow-red card) 88'	Stadium: Estádio da Luz; Attendance: 32,171; Referee: Jacinto Paixão

7 March 2004 25	Gil Vicente	1–2	Benfica	Barcelos
19:15	Braíma 67'	Report	Geovanni 31'; Fernandes 78'	Stadium: Estádio Adelino Ribeiro Novo; Attendance: 5,000; Referee: Carlos Xistra

14 March 2004 26	Benfica	1–0	Marítimo	Lisbon
19:00	Simão 81' (pen.)	Report	Fernando (red card) 54'	Stadium: Estádio da Luz; Attendance: 18,193; Referee: João Vilas Boas

21 March 2004 27	Beira-Mar	0–1	Benfica	Aveiro
20:30		Report	Nuno Gomes 74'; João Pereira (red card) 74'	Stadium: Estádio Municipal de Aveiro; Attendance: 21,901; Referee: Pedro Proença

28 March 2004 28	Benfica	2–0	Alverca	Lisbon
21:15	Šokota 6'; Simão 16'	Report		Stadium: Estádio da Luz; Attendance: 11,767; Referee: Hélio Santos

4 April 2004 29	Rio Ave	1–1	Benfica	Vila do Conde
19:15	Evandro 50'	Report	Tiago 56'	Stadium: Estádio do Rio Ave FC; Attendance: 9,000; Referee: Paulo Paraty

10 April 2004 30	Benfica	2–1	Paços de Ferreira	Lisbon
19:15	Nuno Gomes 47'; Geovanni 87'	Report	Zé Manel 66'; Ricardo André (yellow card) 79' (yellow-red card) 89'	Stadium: Estádio da Luz; Attendance: 16,631; Referee: Paulo Paraty

17 April 2004 31	Braga	0–3	Benfica	Braga
18:45		Report	Miguel 2'; Šokota 23'; Simão 31'	Stadium: Estádio Municipal de Braga; Attendance: 23,000; Referee: António Costa

24 April 2004 32	Benfica	3–1	Estrela Amadora	Lisbon
20:00	Nuno Gomes 14' (pen.); Šokota 45'; Miguel 90+3'	Report	Davide 86'	Stadium: Estádio da Luz; Attendance: 21,227; Referee: Martins dos Santos

2 May 2004 33	Sporting	0–1	Benfica	Lisbon
19:15		Report	Geovanni 88'	Stadium: Estádio de Alvalade; Attendance: 45,280; Referee: Lucílio Baptista

9 May 2004 34	Benfica	0–0	União Leiria	Lisbon
16:00		Report		Stadium: Estádio da Luz; Attendance: 63,434; Referee: Augusto Duarte

=== Taça de Portugal ===
22 November 2003 Fourth Rd	Benfica	3–1	Estrela da Amadora	Lisbon
18:00	João Pereira 73'; Tiago 76'; Roger 81'	Report	Bernardo 85'	Stadium: Estádio da Luz; Referee: Paulo Paraty

17 December 2003 Fifth Rd	Académica	0–1	Benfica	Coimbra
21:15		Report	Luisão 21'; Simão (yellow card) 8' (yellow-red card) 92'	Stadium: Estádio Cidade de Coimbra; Referee: Paulo Costa

11 February 2004 Quarter-finals	Benfica	2–1	Nacional	Lisbon
15:00	Tiago 85'; Tomo Šokota 86'	Report	Serginho Baiano 22'; Cleomir (red card) 95'	Stadium: Estádio da Luz; Referee: Bruno Paixão

17 March 2004 Semi-finals	Benfica	3–1	Belenenses	Lisbon
21:15	Tomo Šokota 7', 9'; Tiago 36'	Report	Hélder Rosário 51'	Stadium: Estádio da Luz; Referee: João Ferreira

16 May 2004 Final	Porto	1–2 (a.e.t.)	Benfica	Lisbon
17:15	Derlei 45'; Jorge Costa (yellow card) 40' (yellow-red card) 70'	Report	Takis Fyssas 58'; Simão 104'	Stadium: Estádio Nacional; Attendance: 45,000; Referee: Lucílio Baptista

=== UEFA Champions League ===
==== Third qualifying round ====
13 August 2003 First leg	Lazio (Italy)	3–1	(Portugal) Benfica	Rome, Italy
19:45	Corradi 16'; Fiore 52'; Mihajlović 80'	Report	Simão 63'	Stadium: Stadio Olimpico; Attendance: 60,000; Referee: Herbert Fandel

27 August 2003 Second leg	Benfica (Portugal)	0–1 (1–4 agg.)	(Italy) Lazio	Porto, Portugal
19:45		Report	César 26'	Stadium: Estádio do Bessa; Attendance: 18,000; Referee: Urs Meier

=== UEFA Cup ===
==== First round ====
24 September 2003 First leg	La Louvière (Belgium)	1–1	(Portugal) Benfica	La Louvière, Belgium
20:00	Peter Odemwingie 14'	Report	Simão 52'	Stadium: Stade du Tivoli; Attendance: 16,000; Referee: Yuri Baskakov

15 October 2003 Second leg	Benfica (Portugal)	1–0 (2–1 agg.)	(Belgium) La Louvière	Porto, Portugal
20:00	Miklós Fehér 58'	Report		Stadium: Estádio do Bessa; Attendance: 12,175; Referee: Pascal Garibian

==== Second round ====
6 November 2003 First leg	Benfica (Portugal)	3–1	(Norway) Molde	Lisbon, Portugal
20:45	Nuno Gomes 18', 53'; Geovanni 51'	Report	Daniel Berg Hestad 76'	Stadium: Estádio da Luz; Attendance: 35,385; Referee: Hermann Albrecht

27 November 2003 Second leg	Molde (Norway)	0–2 (1–5 agg.)	(Portugal) Benfica	Molde, Norway
18:30		Report	Tiago 30', 42'	Stadium: Aker Stadion; Attendance: 4,184; Referee: Andy D'Urso

==== Third round ====
26 February 2004 First leg	Benfica (Portugal)	1–0	(Norway) Rosenborg	Lisbon, Portugal
20:45	Zlatko Zahovič 59'	Report		Stadium: Estádio da Luz; Attendance: 40,000; Referee: Paul Allaerts

3 March 2004 Second leg	Rosenborg (Norway)	2–1 (2–2 a agg.)	(Portugal) Benfica	Trondheim, Norway
18:30	Ørjan Berg 7'; Azar Karadas 15'	Report	Nuno Gomes 19' (yellow card) 25' (yellow-red card) 40'	Stadium: Lerkendal Stadion; Attendance: 18,200; Referee: Vladimír Hriňák

==== Fourth round ====
11 March 2004 First leg	Benfica (Portugal)	0–0	(Italy) Inter Milan	Lisbon, Portugal
21:00		Report		Stadium: Estádio da Luz; Attendance: 64,569; Referee: Jan Wegereef (Netherlands)

25 March 2004 Second leg	Inter Milan (Italy)	4–3 (4–3 agg.)	(Portugal) Benfica	Milan, Italy
18:30	Martins 45+1', 70'; Recoba 60'; Vieri 64'	Report	Nuno Gomes 36', 67'; Tiago 77'	Stadium: San Siro; Attendance: 27,638; Referee: Alain Sars

=== Friendlies ===
17 July 2003	Panathinaikos	2–1	Benfica	Nyon, Switzerland
19:30 CET (UTC+01)	Papadopoulos 54', 90'	Report	Tomo Šokota 47'	Stadium: Centre sportif de Colovray Nyon; Attendance: 3,000

19 July 2003	Sporting	0–1	Benfica	Nyon, Switzerland
19:30 CET (UTC+01)		Report	Fernando Aguiar 29'	Stadium: Centre sportif de Colovray Nyon; Attendance: 4,000

26 July 2003 Guadiana Trophy	Belenenses	2–2 (2–1 p)	Benfica	Vila Real Santo António, Portugal
19:30 CET (UTC+01)	Henri Antchouet 12'; Verona 14'		Argel 57'; Cristiano 90'	Stadium: Complexo Desportivo de Vila Real Santo António

2 August 2003	Boavista	0–2	Benfica	Porto, Portugal
19:30 CET (UTC+01)		Report	Cristiano 31'; Simão 40'	Stadium: Estádio do Bessa; Attendance: 15,000; Referee: José Mesquita

3 August 2003	Leixões	2–5	Benfica	Porto, Portugal
19:30 CET (UTC+01)	João Pedro 49'; Pedras 65'	Report	Cristiano 4'; Hélder 21'; Tomo Šokota 30', 90'; Tiago 56'	Stadium: Estádio do Bessa; Attendance: 18,000; Referee: José Mesquita

6 August 2003	Moreirense	3–1	Benfica	Moreira de Cónegos, Portugal
18:30 CET (UTC+01)	Armando 61', 68', 79'	Report	Cristiano 60'	Stadium: Parque de Jogos Comendador Joaquim de Almeida Freitas; Attendance: 6,000; Referee: José Mesquita

25 October 2003	Benfica	2–1	Nacional Montevideo	Lisbon, Portugal
18:30 CET (UTC+01)	Nuno Gomes 7', 47'	Report	Mello 11'	Stadium: Estádio da Luz; Attendance: 65,000; Referee: Pedro Proença

== Player statistics ==
The squad for the season consisted of the players listed in the tables below, as well as staff members Camacho (manager), Pepe Carcelan (assistant manager) and Alvaro Magalhães (assistant manager).

Note 1: Note: Flags indicate national team as defined under FIFA eligibility rules. Players may hold more than one non-FIFA nationality.

Note 2: Players with squad numbers marked ‡ joined the club during the 2003–04 season via transfer, with more details in the following section.

No.	Pos	Nat	Player	Total		Primeira Liga		Taça de Portugal		Champions League		UEFA Cup	
No.	Pos	Nat	Player	Apps	Goals	Apps	Goals	Apps	Goals	Apps	Goals	Apps	Goals
1	GK	(Portugal) POR	José Moreira	46	-43	33	-28	3	-3	2	-4	8	-8
2	DF	(Mozambique) MOZ	Armando Sá	27	0	19	0	3	0	0	0	5	0
3	DF	(Brazil) BRA	Argel	28	1	19	1	3	0	2	0	4	0
4^{‡}	DF	(Brazil) BRA	Luisão	22	4	15	3	3	1	0	0	4	0
5	DF	(Brazil) BRA	Cristiano Roland	17	1	10	1	2	0	2	0	3	0
6	MF	(Portugal) POR	Petit	35	0	23	0	3	0	2	0	7	0
7	MF	(Sweden) SWE	Anders Andersson	25	0	20	0	1	0	2	0	2	0
8	MF	(Brazil) BRA	Roger	17	3	11	2	2	1	2	0	2	0
9	FW	(Angola) ANG	Mantorras	0	0	0	0	0	0	0	0	0	0
10	MF	(Slovenia) SLO	Zlatko Zahovič	32	3	21	2	3	0	2	0	6	1
11	MF	(Brazil) BRA	Geovanni	32	6	21	5	3	0	2	0	6	1
12^{‡}	GK	(United States) USA	Zach Thornton	0	0	0	0	0	0	0	0	0	0
14^{‡}	DF	(Greece) GRE	Takis Fyssas	16	1	14	0	2	1	0	0	0	0
16	MF	(Canada) CAN	Fernando Aguiar	32	3	25	3	4	0	1	0	2	0
19^{‡}	DF	(Portugal) POR	Alex	18	0	14	0	3	0	0	0	1	0
20	MF	(Portugal) POR	Simão Sabrosa	45	15	31	12	4	1	2	1	8	1
21	FW	(Portugal) POR	Nuno Gomes	29	12	21	7	3	0	0	0	5	5
23	DF	(Portugal) POR	Miguel Monteiro	45	2	30	2	5	0	2	0	8	0
24	GK	(Argentina) ARG	Carlos Bossio	3	-1	1	0	2	-1	0	0	0	0
25	FW	(Croatia) CRO	Tomo Šokota	40	14	29	11	5	3	1	0	5	0
28	MF	(Portugal) POR	Carlitos	3	0	1	0	0	0	0	0	2	0
29	FW	(Hungary) HUN	Miklós Fehér	19	4	13	3	2	0	2	0	2	1
30	MF	(Portugal) POR	Tiago	43	11	29	5	5	3	1	0	8	3
32	DF	(Portugal) POR	Hélder	26	0	20	0	1	0	1	0	4	0
33	DF	(Portugal) POR	Ricardo Rocha	39	0	25	0	4	0	2	0	8	0
37	MF	(Portugal) POR	Manuel Fernandes	14	1	10	1	1	0	0	0	3	0
39	MF	(Portugal) POR	Hélio Pinto	3	0	2	0	0	0	0	0	1	0
47	MF	(Portugal) POR	João Pereira	32	3	25	3	1	0	0	0	6	0

== Transfers ==
=== In ===
Entry date	Position	Player	From club	Fee	Ref
1 July 2003	RW	Alex	Moreirense	Free	
2 August 2003	RW	Geovanni	Barcelona	Free	
22 August 2003	CB	Luisão	Cruzeiro	Undisclosed	
28 December 2003	LB	Takis Fyssas	Panathinaikos	Free	
31 January 2004	GK	Zach Thornton	Chicago Fire	Free	

=== Out ===
Entry date	Position	Player	To club	Fee	Ref
7 July 2003	RW	Ljubinko Drulović	Partizan	Free	
24 July 2003	CB	João Manuel Pinto	Ciudad de Murcia	Free	
22 August 2003	DM	Luís Andrade	Tenerife	Undisclosed	
24 January 2004	ST	André Neles	Marítimo	Free	
31 January 2004	RW	Carlitos	Poli Ejido	Undisclosed	
31 January 2004	CM	Anders Andersson	Belenenses	Undisclosed	
14 February 2004	LW	Hugo Porfírio	None	Released	

=== Out by loan ===
Entry date	Position	Player	To club	Return date	Ref
29 June 2003	CB	Geraldo Alves	Paços de Ferreira	30 June 2004	
30 June 2003	GK	Nuno Santos	Vitória Setúbal	30 June 2004	
15 July 2003	CB	Eduardo Simões	Amora	30 June 2004	
22 August 2003	DM	Peixe	Leiria	30 June 2004	
31 August 2003	CM	Ednilson	Vitória Guimarães	30 June 2004	
30 January 2004	AM	Roger	Fluminense	30 December 2004	
31 January 2004	FW	Anderson Luiz	Naval	30 June 2004	

== See also ==
- 2003–04 in Portuguese football
