= 2004 Taça de Portugal final =

- Event: 2003–04 Taça de Portugal
Benfica	Porto
2	1
- After extra time
- Date: 16 May 2004
- Venue: Estádio Nacional, Oeiras
- Man of the Match: Takis Fyssas (Benfica)
- Referee: Lucílio Batista (Setúbal)
- Attendance: 38,000

The 2004 Taça de Portugal final was the final match of the 2003–04 Taça de Portugal, the 64th season of the Taça de Portugal, the premier Portuguese football cup competition organized by the Portuguese Football Federation (FPF). The match was played on 16 May 2004 at the Estádio Nacional in Oeiras, and featured two Primeira Liga rivals: Benfica and Porto. Benfica defeated Porto 2–1, thanks to an extra-time goal from Portuguese winger Simão after the match had ended 1–1. Benfica players dedicated the trophy to Miklós Fehér.

In Portugal, the final was televised live on TVI and Sport TV. As Benfica claimed their 24th Taça de Portugal, they qualified for the 2004 Supertaça Cândido de Oliveira, where they took on the winners of the 2003–04 Primeira Liga, Porto, at the Estádio Cidade de Coimbra.

== Match ==
=== Details ===
16 May 2004
17:15 WEST

Benfica	2–1 (a.e.t.)	Porto
Fyssas 58'; Simão 104'		Derlei 45'

Estádio Nacional, Oeiras
Attendance: 38,000
Referee: Lucílio Batista (Setúbal)

Benfica	Porto

GK	1	(Portugal) José Moreira
RB	2	(Mozambique) Armando Sá		(substituted off) 55'
CB	4	(Brazil) Luisão	(yellow card) 115'
CB	33	(Portugal) Ricardo Rocha
LB	14	(Greece) Takis Fyssas	(yellow card) 80'
CM	6	(Portugal) Petit	(yellow card) 49'
CM	30	(Portugal) Tiago	(yellow card) 67'	(substituted off) 79'
RM	23	(Portugal) Miguel
LM	20	(Portugal) Simão (c)	(yellow card) 72'
CF	21	(Portugal) Nuno Gomes
CF	25	(Croatia) Tomo Šokota		(substituted off) 55'
Substitutes:
GK	24	(Argentina) Carlos Bossio
DF	3	(Brazil) Argel
DF	32	(Portugal) Hélder
DF	47	(Portugal) João Pereira
MF	10	(Slovenia) Zlatko Zahovič		(substituted on) 79'
MF	11	(Brazil) Geovanni		(substituted on) 55'
MF	16	(Canada) Fernando Aguiar		(substituted on) 55'
Manager:
(Spain) José Antonio Camacho

GK	13	(Portugal) Nuno
RB	22	(Portugal) Paulo Ferreira
CB	2	(Portugal) Jorge Costa (c)	(yellow card) 40' (red card) 70'
CB	4	(Portugal) Ricardo Carvalho
LB	8	(Portugal) Nuno Valente	(yellow card) 93'
DM	6	(Portugal) Costinha	(yellow card) 67'	(substituted off) 99'
CM	23	(Portugal) Pedro Mendes		(substituted off) 71'
CM	18	(Portugal) Maniche
AM	10	(Portugal) Deco	(yellow card) 71'
CF	11	(Brazil) Derlei	(yellow card) 74'
CF	77	(South Africa) Benni McCarthy		(substituted off) 68'
Substitutes:
GK	99	(Portugal) Vítor Baía
DF	3	(Portugal) Pedro Emanuel		(substituted on) 71'
DF	5	(Portugal) Ricardo Costa
MF	15	(Russia) Dmitri Alenichev
MF	19	(Brazil) Carlos Alberto		(substituted on) 99'
FW	9	(Lithuania) Edgaras Jankauskas
FW	21	(Brazil) Maciel		(substituted on) 68'
Manager:
(Portugal) José Mourinho

2003–04 Taça de Portugal Winners
Benfica
24th title

Man of the match

- (Greece) Takis Fyssas (Benfica)

Match officials

- Assistant referees:
  - Luís Salgado (Setúbal)
  - Venâncio Tomé (Setúbal)
- Fourth official: João Ferreira (Setúbal)

Match rules

- 90 minutes
- 30 minutes of extra time if necessary
- Penalty shoot-out if scores still level
- Seven named substitutes
- Maximum of three substitutions

== See also ==
- O Clássico
- 2003–04 S.L. Benfica season
- 2003–04 FC Porto season
