= Alex (footballer, born 1979) =

Portuguese footballer

Personal information
- Full name: Domingos Alexandre Martins da Costa
- Date of birth: 6 September 1979 (age 47)
- Place of birth: Guimarães, Portugal
- Height: 1.78 m (5 ft 10 in)
- Position: Wing-back

Team information
- Current team: Portimonense (manager)

Youth career
- 1990–1994: Vitória Guimarães
- 1994–1995: Ribeira Pena
- 1995–1998: Vitória Guimarães

Senior career*
Years	Team	Apps	(Gls)
1998–2001	Fafe	76	(16)
2001–2003	Moreirense	57	(8)
2003–2005	Benfica	14	(0)
2004–2005	→ Vitória Guimarães (loan)	31	(4)
2005–2009	VfL Wolfsburg	21	(0)
2009–2013	Vitória Guimarães	95	(0)
2013	Vitória Guimarães B	1	(0)
Total		295	(28)

International career
2005	Portugal	3	(0)

Managerial career
- 2013–2014: Felgueiras 1932
- 2014: Académico Viseu
- 2016–2018: Vitória Guimarães (youth)
- 2018–2019: Vitória Guimarães B
- 2020–2021: Zamalek (assistant)
- 2022–2024: Covilhã
- 2025–2026: Amarante
- 2026–: Portimonense
- * Club domestic league appearances and goals

Domingos Alexandre Martins da Costa (born 6 September 1979), commonly known as Alex, is a Portuguese former professional footballer who played mainly as a right-back. He is currently manager of Liga Portugal 2 club Portimonense.

Over seven seasons (15 years in total as a professional), he amassed Primeira Liga totals of 170 matches and seven goals, mainly at the service of Vitória de Guimarães as well as Moreirense and Benfica. He also spent four years in the German Bundesliga with VfL Wolfsburg.

Alex began managing in 2013, leading four teams in his country's second tier.

== Club career ==
Alex was born in Guimarães. After starting his career at AD Fafe he joined Moreirense FC, where he won promotion to the Primeira Liga as champion in 2001–02 and then contributed three goals as they came 12th in his and their first top-flight campaign; this included two on 19 January in a 2–1 away win against S.C. Beira-Mar. He then joined Benfica, where he and fellow defender Luisão were the only signings made by manager José Antonio Camacho ahead of the new season. He mainly fought for a position with the established Miguel.

For 2004–05, Alex was loaned to Vitória de Guimarães. He scored four top-flight goals that season as his hometown club came fifth and qualified for the UEFA Cup, starting on 15 November with the equaliser in a 1–1 draw at Rio Ave FC; on 18 March, his brace earned a 2–1 away victory over C.S. Marítimo.

Benfica sold Alex to VfL Wolfsburg on the final days of the summer 2005 transfer window. He had a relatively successful debut campaign, but only appeared four times in the Bundesliga over the next three (none in the last two).

In late May 2009, Alex signed with former club Vitória de Guimarães on a free transfer. During that first season he operated mostly as a right-back, going on to be fully reconverted to the position the following years and being first-choice.

== International career ==
Alex earned three caps for Portugal under Luiz Felipe Scolari in 2005. His debut was on 4 June at home to Slovakia in the 2006 FIFA World Cup qualifiers, starting the 2–0 win at the Estádio da Luz, followed four days later by a 1–0 away victory against Estonia.

== Coaching career ==
On 3 July 2013, Alex announced his retirement from professional football at the age of nearly 34, immediately starting his managerial career with F.C. Felgueiras 1932 in the third division. He first arrived at the professionals in May 2014 after leading his team to safety, being appointed at Segunda Liga side Académico de Viseu FC.

Alex won his first game at Académico, 4–1 at home to Portimonense S.C. in the first round of the Taça da Liga on 27 July 2014; they then lost 5–4 on aggregate against C.F. Os Belenenses after winning the first leg 3–1. He left by mutual consent on 12 November, being one point above the relegation zone after 16 matches.

After three years in charge of the under-19 team, Alex succeeded Vítor Campelos at Vitória de Guimarães B in June 2018. The side suffered relegation to the third tier at the end of the campaign, and he was fired on 9 December 2019 while in sixth place.

Following a spell as assistant to compatriot Jaime Pacheco at Zamalek SC of the Egyptian Premier League, Alex ran for Vitória's presidency in March 2022, losing to António Miguel Cardoso; he then replaced Leonel Pontes as manager of S.C. Covilhã on 6 October. They were relegated in last place, ending a 15-year spell in division two.

Alex was appointed at Liga 3 club Amarante F.C. on 17 October 2025, following the dismissal of Eurico Couto due to poor results. He eventually helped it achieve a second-ever promotion to the professional leagues, the first in 37 years, being voted Manager of the Month three times in the process.

On 17 July 2026, Alex became head coach of second-tier Portimonense.

== Career statistics ==
=== Club ===
Appearances and goals by club, season and competition
Club	Season	League		Cup		League Cup		Continental		Other		Total	
Club	Season	Apps	Goals	Apps	Goals	Apps	Goals	Apps	Goals	Apps	Goals	Apps	Goals
Fafe	1998–99	17	0	1	0	—		—		—		18	0
Fafe	1999–00	27	8	7	1	—		—		—		34	9
Fafe	2000–01	31	8	0	0	—		—		—		31	8
Fafe	Total	75	16	8	1	—		—		—		83	17
Moreirense	2001–02	27	5	2	0	—		—		—		29	5
Moreirense	2002–03	30	3	2	0	—		—		—		32	3
Moreirense	Total	57	8	4	0	—		—		—		61	8
Benfica	2003–04	14	0	3	0	—		2	0	—		19	0
Benfica	2005–06	0	0	—		—		—		0	0	0	0
Benfica	Total	14	0	3	0	—		2	0	0	0	19	0
Vitória Guimarães (loan)	2004–05	31	4	3	0	—		—		—		34	4
VfL Wolfsburg	2005–06	17	0	0	0	—		—		—		17	0
VfL Wolfsburg	2006–07	4	0	1	0	—		—		—		5	0
VfL Wolfsburg	2007–08	0	0	0	0	—		—		—		0	0
VfL Wolfsburg	2008–09	0	0	0	0	—		0	0	—		0	0
VfL Wolfsburg	Total	21	0	1	0	—		0	0	—		22	0
VfL Wolfsburg II	2007–08	1	0	—		—		—		—		1	0
Vitória Guimarães	2009–10	22	0	3	0	3	0	—		—		28	0
Vitória Guimarães	2010–11	28	0	6	0	1	0	—		—		35	0
Vitória Guimarães	2011–12	28	0	2	0	2	0	4	0	1	0	37	0
Vitória Guimarães	2012–13	17	0	5	0	1	0	—		—		23	0
Vitória Guimarães	Total	95	0	16	0	7	0	4	0	1	0	123	0
Vitória Guimarães B	2012–13	1	0	—		—		—		—		1	0
Career total		295	28	35	1	7	0	6	0	1	0	344	29

=== International ===
Appearances and goals by national team and year
National team	Year	Apps	Goals
Portugal	2005	3	0
Total		3	0

== Honours ==
=== Player ===
Moreirense

- Segunda Liga: 2001–02

Benfica

- Taça de Portugal: 2003–04
- Supertaça Cândido de Oliveira: 2005

Vitória Guimarães

- Taça de Portugal: 2012–13

=== Manager ===
Amarante

- Liga 3: 2025–26
