= Cristiano Roland =

Brazilian footballer

Personal information
- Full name: Cristiano Rocha Canedo Roland
- Date of birth: 4 October 1976 (age 50)
- Place of birth: Porto Alegre, Brazil
- Height: 1.82 m (6 ft 0 in)
- Position: Left-back

Team information
- Current team: Vietnam U17 (head coach)

Youth career
- 1994–1995: Grêmio

Senior career*
Years	Team	Apps	(Gls)
1996–1997	Vasco da Gama	14	(4)
1998	Grêmio	8	(5)
1998–2002	Beira-Mar	77	(7)
2002–2005	Benfica	24	(1)
2004–2005	→ Belenenses (loan)	10	(0)
2005	Benfica B	2	(1)
2006	Juventude		
2006–2007	Atromitos	9	(0)
2008	Hanoi FC		(4)
2008–2009	Beira-Mar	26	(1)
2009–2013	Hanoi FC	88	(6)
2015–2016	Beira-Mar	18	(0)
Total		276	(23)

Managerial career
- 2021–2023: Becamex Bình Dương (Assistant)
- 2023–2024: Hanoi FC Youth
- 2024–: Vietnam U17
- 2024: SHB Da Nang
- 2025–: Hanoi FC Youth
- * Club domestic league appearances and goals as of 24 January 2025 ‡ National team caps and goals as of 24 January 2025

Not to confused with Cristiano Ronaldo.

Cristiano Rocha Canedo Roland (born 4 October 1976), sometimes known simply as Cristiano, is a retired Brazilian footballer who played as a left-back. He is currently the head coach of Vietnam U17.

He started at Grêmio and moved to Vasco da Gama in 1996, where he won the Brasileirão in 1997. In 1998, he signed with Beira-Mar winning a Portuguese Cup in 1999 and transferring to Benfica in 2002, where he won another Portuguese Cup in 2004. In 2007, he moved to the V-League, playing for Hanoi T&T on two different spells, winning three major titles.

== Playing career ==
Born in Porto Alegre, Cristiano started at Grêmio in 1994, and spending two years in their youth system. In 1996, he moved to Vasco da Gama and helped them win the Brasileirão in 1997. After a short period back at Grêmio, Cristiano moved abroad and joined Beira-Mar in 1998. He was sparsely used in his first year, that ended with mixed results: relegation in the Primeira Divisão and the conquering the Portuguese Cup. His influence grew in the following three seasons and he became known as free-kick specialist. In 2001–02, Cristiano scored three league goals, two of them against Porto, and in both times, Beira-Mar won.

In June 2002, Benfica signed him on a four-year deal, with Diogo Luís and Toni going in the other direction on loan deals. From early on, Cristiano struggled with competition from Ricardo Rocha, and on occasions, Cabral. He only made his debut on 3 November 2002 against Santa Clara, but with the arrival of José Antonio Camacho, he began playing much more frequently, finishing the season with 14 appearances. The following season, Cristiano was set to reunite with Jesualdo Ferreira at Braga, but the loan deal fell through. Still, Cristiano started 8 league games in the first half of the season, until the arrival of Fyssas in January. From then on, he became a bench player and never returned to the starting eleven. In May, he added his second trophy in Portugal, after winning the 2003–04 Taça de Portugal.

In July 2004, he was loaned to Belenenses for one year. Initially, he was an undisputed starter playing six games in a row, but an injury in late October, cause him to lost his place to Cabral and José Sousa. In 2005–06, Cristiano could not find a team and was placed in Benfica B, but mutually terminated his contract on late September 2005. After Benfica, he spent some time at Juventude in the Série A, before moving to Atromitos in the Greek league. He played for Hanoi T&T in 2007 and returned to Beira-Mar in July 2008, playing 26 games in the Liga de Honra. In 2009, Cristiano moved back to Hanoi T&T and won the league in 2010 and 2013, retiring in 2013. In August 2015, he came out of retirement for a third stint at Beira-Mar, after they were relegated to the Aveiro FA's second division.

== Managerial career ==
Cristiano began his coaching career at the youth team of his former club Hanoi. He led Hanoi's U-17 side to win the 2024 Vietnamese U-17 Championship. Shortly after the triumph, he became the head coach of Vietnam U17 and led the team to qualify for the 2025 AFC U-17 Asian Cup.

On 3 December 2024, Cristiano was appointed as the head coach of V.League 1 side SHB Da Nang. This was the first professional club that he led in his managerial career. But he soon left the coaching position due to him becoming the technical director.

On 13 May 2026, Cristiano helped the Vietnam U17 qualify for the 2026 FIFA U-17 World Cup after defeating the UAE 3-2 in the group stage of the 2026 AFC U-17 Asian Cup.

== Honours ==
=== As player ===
Vasco da Gama

- Brasileirão: 1997

Beira-Mar

- Taça de Portugal: 1998–99

Benfica

- Taça de Portugal: 2003–04

Hanoi T&T

- V.League 1: 2010, 2013
- Vietnamese Super Cup: 2010

=== As manager ===
Vietnam U17

- ASEAN U-17 Boys' Championship: 2026
