= Luís Filipe (footballer, born 1979) =

Portuguese footballer (born 1979)

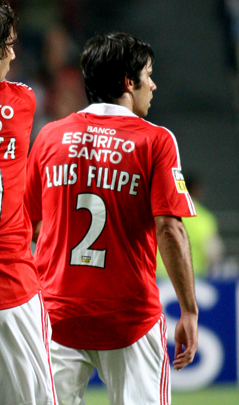
- Luís Filipe with Benfica in 2007

Personal information
- Full name: Luís Filipe Ângelo Rodrigues Fernandes
- Date of birth: 14 June 1979 (age 47)
- Place of birth: Cantanhede, Portugal
- Height: 1.77 m (5 ft 10 in)
- Position: Right-back

Team information
- Current team: Botafogo (assistant)

Youth career
- 1987–1992: Marialvas
- 1992–1993: Porto
- 1993–1995: Académica
- 1995–1996: Marialvas
- 1996–1998: Académica

Senior career*
Years	Team	Apps	(Gls)
1998–1999	Académica	19	(2)
1999	Atlético Madrid B	0	(0)
1999–2001	Braga	52	(8)
2000	Braga B	1	(0)
2001–2004	Sporting CP	18	(0)
2001–2003	Sporting CP B	10	(2)
2004	→ União Leiria (loan)	16	(2)
2004–2005	Marítimo	30	(0)
2005–2007	Braga	56	(1)
2007–2011	Benfica	23	(0)
2008–2009	→ Vitória Guimarães (loan)	16	(1)
2011–2014	Olhanense	39	(0)
Total		280	(16)

International career
1998–1999	Portugal U20	10	(0)
2000–2002	Portugal U21	9	(0)
2001–2005	Portugal B	3	(0)

Managerial career
- 2024: Estrela Amadora (assistant)
- 2025: Farense (assistant)
- 2026–: Botafogo (assistant)
- * Club domestic league appearances and goals

Luís Filipe Ângelo Rodrigues Fernandes (born 14 June 1979), known as Luís Filipe, is a Portuguese former professional footballer who played mainly as a defender but also as a midfielder, always on the right side. He is currently assistant manager of Campeonato Brasileiro Série A club Botafogo.

He amassed Primeira Liga totals of 269 games and 14 goals over 16 seasons, representing in the competition Académica, Braga (two spells), Sporting CP, União de Leiria, Marítimo, Benfica, Vitória de Guimarães and Olhanense.

== Playing career ==
Born in Cantanhede, Coimbra District, Luís Filipe started playing professionally as a right winger with Académica de Coimbra, and had a small abroad stint with Spain's Atlético Madrid, spent entirely with the reserves. Unsettled, he moved to S.C. Braga, where he blossomed as a Primeira Liga player.

Luís Filipe's development led to a 2001 transfer to Sporting CP. Opportunities were scarce, and he subsequently reconverted to right-back in the molds of Miguel, upon his loan at U.D. Leiria. On 6 August 2003, he scored the first-ever goal at the new Estádio José Alvalade in a 3–1 friendly win against Manchester United.

In the 2004–05 season, Luís Filipe represented C.S. Marítimo. Subsequently, he returned to Braga.

Luís Filipe signed a four-year deal with S.L. Benfica for a €500.000 fee in early August 2007, with also right-back João Pereira going the other way. After an unsuccessful year in Lisbon, he was deemed surplus to requirements by new coach Quique Sánchez Flores, moving alongside Nuno Assis to UEFA Champions League challenger Vitória S.C. in Guimarães, on loan (Assis permanently); the Minho club retained the option to buy the player at the end of the campaign, but it was not activated.

In 2009–10, as Benfica won the league, Luís Filipe's output consisted of 25 minutes in the 1–0 home victory over FC Porto. As the team reached the last eight in the UEFA Europa League, he added a further two appearances.

Luís Filipe played three league games in the 2010–11 season – one win, one draw and one loss– with manager Jorge Jesus resting several starters in rounds which brought a Europa League fixture the following week, as the side fared better in that competition and reached the semi-finals. In mid-May 2011, he left the club as his contract expired and was not renewed. Two months later, he signed for S.C. Olhanense in the same league.

== Coaching career ==
Luís Filipe subsequently worked as an assistant manager, at C.F. Estrela da Amadora, S.C. Farense and Campeonato Brasileiro Série A's Botafogo FR.

== Personal life ==
After retiring, Luís Filipe began working in agriculture, owning a farm in Vilamoura that specialised in the growing of raspberries.

== Honours ==
Sporting CP

- Primeira Liga: 2001–02
- Taça de Portugal: 2001–02

Benfica

- Primeira Liga: 2009–10
- Taça da Liga: 2010–11
