= Takis Fyssas =

Greek footballer (born 1973)

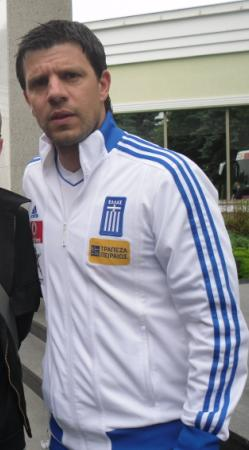
- Fyssas as a member of the Greek staff at Euro 2012

Personal information
- Full name: Panagiotis Fyssas
- Date of birth: 12 June 1973 (age 53)
- Place of birth: Athens, Greece
- Height: 6 ft 2 in (1.88 m)
- Position: Left back

Team information
- Current team: Panathinaikos (Third vice president, Strategy consultant & ambassador)

Youth career
- Panionios

Senior career*
Years	Team	Apps	(Gls)
1990–1998	Panionios	150	(9)
1998–2003	Panathinaikos	123	(6)
2003–2005	Benfica	30	(1)
2005–2007	Hearts	53	(1)
2007–2008	Panathinaikos	7	(0)
Total		363	(16)

International career
1999–2007	Greece	60	(4)
Medal record
Men's football
Representing Greece
UEFA European Championship
Winner	2004
- * Club domestic league appearances and goals

Takis Fyssas (Greek: Τάκης Φύσσας, born 12 June 1973) is a Greek former professional footballer who played as a left back. After his retirement he served as the sporting director of the Greece national team.

From 1999 to 2007, he earned 60 caps for the Greece national team. He was part of the team which won Euro 2004.

== Club career ==
=== Panionios ===
Fyssas started his career in the Panionios youth academy, achieving his senior debut in the 1990–91 season. After eight seasons in Nea Smyrni, which included a Greek Football Cup triumph.

=== Panathinaikos ===
He signed for Athens club Panathinaikos in 1998. The increased exposure Fyssas received playing at the Spiros Louis ensured a rapid elevation to the Greece national side and he made his debut against Finland in 1999. Fyssas also made his first UEFA Champions League appearance while with the Greens, in the 2000–01 season.

=== Benfica ===
In December 2003, he moved to Lisbon with Benfica, where he was to stay for a season and a half, helping Benfica claim the 2003–04 Portuguese Cup and 2004–05 Primeira Liga. On 25 January 2004, he was on the bench for a 1–0 away win against Vitória de Guimarães, a game overshadowed by the sudden death of his teammate Miklós Fehér. He scored a goal on the final of Portuguese Cup that season, that gave them the victory against FC Porto.

=== Hearts ===
After being allowed to leave Benfica in the summer of 2005, Fyssas made the surprise decision to move to Scotland with Hearts, despite reported interest from England and Germany. He collected his fourth career winners medal in his first season with the Tynecastle side, when they defeated Gretna in the 2005–06 Scottish Cup final. His first and only Hearts goal came in a league game against Motherwell on 9 December 2006. He became a popular member of the Hearts team and will always be remembered fondly for his celebrations after clinching a place in the UEFA Champions League. He left the Edinburgh club at the end of the 2006–07 season to move back to Panathinaikos.

=== Panathinaikos ===
In his second Panathinaikos term, he played just a couple of games and he silently decided to retire from football.

== International career ==
Fyssas played 60 matches for Greece national team and he scored four goals. He was one of the key players for team that won the Euro 2004 championship in Portugal, a win that shocked the footballing world as Greece were considered 100–1 outsiders before the tournament started.

== After retirement ==
Fyssas after his retirement entered into the staff of Panathinaikos Youth Departments serving as technical director. Then he was hired to the Greece national team, helping Otto Rehhagel for the 2010 FIFA World Cup and the new coach Fernando Santos after Rehhagel retired in 2010. He also served as sporting director of the Greece national team until 2024.

In May 2019 Fyssas, was nominated as a candidate for Greece's New Democracy Party at the Greek legislative election, but he failed to get elected.

== Career statistics ==
=== Club ===
Appearances and goals by club, season and competition
Club	Season	League			National Cup		League Cup		Europe		Total	
Club	Season	Division	Apps	Goals	Apps	Goals	Apps	Goals	Apps	Goals	Apps	Goals
Panionios	1990–91	Alpha Ethniki	1	0								
Panionios	1991–92	Alpha Ethniki	0	0								
Panionios	1992–93	Beta Ethniki	3	0								
Panionios	1993–94	Alpha Ethniki	18	2								
Panionios	1994–95	Alpha Ethniki	28	0								
Panionios	1995–96	Alpha Ethniki	32	3								
Panionios	1996–97	Beta Ethniki	28	0								
Panionios	1997–98	Alpha Ethniki	29	1								
Panionios	1998–99	Alpha Ethniki	11	3								
Panionios	Total		150	9								
Panathinaikos	1998–99	Alpha Ethniki	18	3								
Panathinaikos	1999–00	Alpha Ethniki	24	0								
Panathinaikos	2000–01	Alpha Ethniki	25	1								
Panathinaikos	2001–02	Alpha Ethniki	20	0								
Panathinaikos	2002–03	Alpha Ethniki	27	0								
Panathinaikos	2003–04	Alpha Ethniki	9	2								
Panathinaikos	Total		123	6								
Benfica	2003–04	Primeira Liga	14	0								
Benfica	2004–05	Primeira Liga	16	0								
Benfica	Total		30	0								
Heart of Midlothian	2005–06	Premier League	32	0								
Heart of Midlothian	2006–07	Premier League	21	1								
Heart of Midlothian	Total		53	1								
Panathinaikos	2007–08	Super League Greece	7	0								
Career total			363	16								

=== International goals ===
Scores and results list Greece's goal tally first, score column indicates score after each Fyssas goal.

List of international goals scored by Takis Fyssas
No.	Date	Venue	Opponent	Score	Result	Competition
1	13 February 2002	Kleanthis Vikelides Stadium, Thessaloniki, Greece	Sweden	1–1	2–2	Friendly
2	15 May 2002	Ethniko Stadium, Rhodes, Greece	Cyprus	1–1	3–1	Friendly
3	15 May 2002	Ethniko Stadium, Rhodes, Greece	Cyprus	2–1	3–1	Friendly
4	29 January 2003	GSZ Stadium, Larnaca, Cyprus	Cyprus	1–1	2–1	Friendly

== Honours ==
Panionios

- Greek Cup: 1997–98

Benfica

- Primeira Liga: 2004–05
- Taça de Portugal: 2003–04
- Supertaça Cândido de Oliveira: runner-up 2004

Hearts

- Scottish Cup: 2006

Greece

- UEFA European Championship: 2004
