= Braíma Injai =

Guinea-Bissauan footballer

Braíma
Personal information
- Full name: Braíma Injai
- Date of birth: 6 October 1975 (age 51)
- Place of birth: Bissau, Guinea-Bissau
- Height: 1.83 m (6 ft 0 in)
- Position: Midfielder

Youth career
- 1992–1994: Boavista

Senior career*
Years	Team	Apps	(Gls)
1994–1995	Gondomar		
1995–1996	Torres Novas	27	(5)
1996–1997	Gondomar	31	(3)
1997–1998	União Lamas	31	(3)
1998–1999	Boavista	0	(0)
1999–2001	Aves	58	(4)
2001–2002	Leça	7	(2)
2002–2006	Gil Vicente	103	(2)
2006–2007	Portimonense	13	(0)
2007–2008	Olympiakos Nicosia	13	(0)
2009	1º Maio		
2010	Vitória Pico	11	(0)
2010–2012	Melgacense	59	(5)
2012–2013	Vianense	14	(0)
Total		367	(24)

International career
1996–2007	Guinea-Bissau	26	(4)
- * Club domestic league appearances and goals

Braíma Injai (born 6 October 1975), known as Braíma, is a Guinea Bissauan retired footballer. Mainly a defensive midfielder, he also held Portuguese nationality due to the years spent playing in that country.

== Club career ==
Born in Bissau, Injai played most of his career in Portugal, mainly for modest clubs, but had a four-year Primeira Liga spell with Gil Vicente FC, being used with regularity. His worst output consisted of 22 matches in the 2002–03 season, in which he started in 18 of those appearances as the Barcelos team finished in eighth position.

In July 2007, after a brief spell in the Portuguese second division with Portimonense SC, Braíma left for Cyprus's Olympiakos Nicosia. In early 2009, he returned to Africa, joining Angolan side Estrela Clube Primeiro de Maio, but went back to Portugal shortly after and resumed his career in amateur football.

== International career ==
Braíma was a stalwart for the Guinea-Bissau national team for well over a decade, appearing in many FIFA World Cup qualification series.
