= 2003–04 in Portuguese football =

Association football-related events in Portugal during the 2003–2004 season

The 2003–04 football season in Portuguese football was dominated by FC Porto, which was later involved in the corruption scandal Apito Dourado in relation to this season. Although Porto failed to win the Portuguese Double because of losing 1–2 to Benfica in the Taça de Portugal final, the club won the UEFA Champions League, becoming the first Portuguese team to do so in the current form of the competition.

== Domestic competitions ==
=== SuperLiga ===
- Champion: FC Porto (UEFA Champions League group stage)
- UEFA Champions League third qualifying round: Benfica
- UEFA Cup: Sporting Clube de Portugal, CD Nacional, SC Braga, CS Marítimo
- UEFA Intertoto Cup: UD Leiria
- Relegation: FC Alverca, FC Paços de Ferreira, CF Estrela da Amadora

The 2003-2004 season was dominated by FC Porto. After winning the SuperLiga, the Cup of Portugal and the UEFA Cup in 2003, José Mourinho's side dominated the championship from start to finish.

Benfica maintained the second place achieved in 2002-2003.

Sporting Clube de Portugal had a disappointing season, finishing third. At the end of the season coach Fernando Santos resigned.

CD Nacional was the great surprise finishing fourth. Due to Porto's success in European competition the previous year, the third (Sporting Clube de Portugal), fourth (CD Nacional) and fifth placed (SC Braga) teams qualified for the UEFA Cup.

=== Cup of Portugal ===
- Winner: Benfica
- Runner-up: FC Porto

The 2003-2004 edition of the Cup of Portugal was won by Benfica that defeated FC Porto 2-1 in the final.

Because both teams in the final had already qualified for the UEFA Champions League, the UEFA Cup spot usually allocated to the winner of the Cup went to CS Marítimo, who finished sixth in the SuperLiga.

=== SuperCup Cândido de Oliveira ===
The 2003-2004 SuperCup Cândido de Oliveira was won by FC Porto who defeated UD Leiria in the Estádio D. Afonso Henriques, Guimarães, in August 2003.

=== Minor leagues ===
- League of Honour
  - Champion: GD Estoril-Praia
  - Promoted: GD Estoril-Praia, Vitória FC, FC Penafiel
  - Relegated: Sporting da Covilhã, União da Madeira and SC Salgueiros (due to financial problems)
- Segunda Divisão
  - Northern zone champion: Gondomar SC
  - Central zone champion: SC Espinho
  - Southern zone champion: Olhanense SC
  - Relegated: ?
- Terceira Divisão
  - Serie A champion: SC Valenciano
  - Serie B champion: GD Ribeirão
  - Serie C champion: SC Penalva do Castelo
  - Serie D champion: Benfica Castelo Branco
  - Serie E champion: Casa Pia AC
  - Serie F champion: Atlético Clube de Portugal
  - Serie Açores champion: Operário dos Açores
  - Promoted: ?
  - Relegated: ?

== International competitions ==
=== UEFA Champions League ===
Two Portuguese teams participated in the 2003-2004 edition of UEFA Champions League: FC Porto and Benfica. FC Porto won their second European trophy in two years, beating Partizan Belgrade, Marseille, Manchester United, Lyon, Deportivo La Coruña and AS Monaco on their way. The only team Porto faced and failed to beat was Real Madrid in the group stage.

=== UEFA Cup ===
The Portuguese participants in this edition of the UEFA Cup were: Benfica, Sporting and União de Leiria. Benfica entered the first round of the UEFA Cup. They were the most successful Portuguese team in the competition, reaching the fourth round, where they lost to an Italian team, Inter Milan. Prior to this, they beat La Louvière, Molde and Rosenborg. Sporting beat Malmö in the first round, but were surprised in the following round by Turkish team Gençlerbirligi, who beat Sporting in their own stadium by 3-0. União de Leiria entered in the final preliminary round, where they beat Coleraine, but they were knocked out in the first round by Molde (who were subsequently beaten by Benfica in the following round).

== National team ==
=== UEFA Euro 2004 ===
See: UEFA Euro 2004
