= Fernando Aguiar =

Portuguese-born Canadian soccer player

Personal information
- Full name: Fernando João Lobo Aguiar
- Date of birth: 18 March 1972 (age 54)
- Place of birth: Chaves, Portugal
- Height: 1.85 m (6 ft 1 in)
- Position: Defensive midfielder

Youth career
- 1981–1986: Scarborough Blizzard
- 1987: Wexford
- 1988–1989: Oshawa Turul

Senior career*
Years	Team	Apps	(Gls)
1991–1993	Toronto Blizzard	22	(9)
1994–1995	Marítimo	7	(0)
1995–1997	Nacional	39	(4)
1997–1999	Maia	54	(9)
1999–2001	Beira-Mar	75	(10)
2002–2004	Benfica	38	(3)
2002–2003	→ União Leiria (loan)	28	(4)
2004	Landskrona BoIS	1	(0)
2004–2005	Penafiel	21	(3)
2005–2009	Gondomar	93	(10)
2013–2014	Pedrouços	17	(5)
Total		395	(57)

International career
1992	Canada U23	4	(0)
1995–1999	Canada	13	(0)
- * Club domestic league appearances and goals

Fernando João Lobo Aguiar (born 18 March 1972) is a former professional soccer player who played as a defensive midfielder.

He amassed Primeira Liga totals of 138 matches and 13 goals over six seasons, appearing in the competition for Marítimo, Beira-Mar, Benfica, União de Leiria and Penafiel. He added 195 games and 25 goals in the Segunda Liga.

Born in Portugal, Aguiar represented Canada internationally.

== Club career ==
Born in Chaves, Aguiar moved to Canada at an early age, beginning his career in the Canadian Soccer League where he represented local Toronto Blizzard. Although the league disbanded in 1992, he remained with the team for their only season in the American Professional Soccer League; additionally, he played organised ice hockey at amateur level.

Dubbed RoboCop due to his powerful frame, Aguiar started competing in Europe in 1994, with Portuguese Primeira Liga club C.S. Marítimo. He had trouble making the lineups and subsequently dropped down to the Segunda Liga where he spent four of the next five years, playing for C.D. Nacional, F.C. Maia and S.C. Beira-Mar, helping the latter to achieve promotion in 2000 and subsequently stay in the top flight.

Aguiar's good form was noticed by S.L. Benfica, for whom he signed a six-month contract in December 2001, going on to play a somewhat important defensive role. On 25 January 2004, he scored the only goal in a 1–0 away win against Vitória de Guimarães (in the 90th minute), assisted by Miklós Fehér who would die in the hospital hours later. He also helped the Lisbon-based side claim the 2003–04 edition of the Taça de Portugal, featuring 65 minutes of the 2–1 extra-time victory over FC Porto in the final.

After his cup-winning exploits, Aguiar transferred to Swedish club Landskrona BoIS. However, an injury and his high wages ruined the move, and he left after only a few months for F.C. Penafiel. In August 2005 he joined second-tier Gondomar SC, representing it for four years and suffering relegation in the last, after which he was released at age 37, retiring shortly after.

On 13 November 2013, more than four years after his last match, Aguiar came out of retirement, moving to Pedrouços A.C. in the Porto regional divisions.

== International career ==
Aguiar possessed both Portuguese and Canadian citizenship but, having grown up in Canada, he eventually featured for its national team. Ironically, he made his debut in a January 1995 SkyDome Cup match against Portugal, and went on to earn a total of 13 caps scoring no goals.

Aguiar represented Canada in four FIFA World Cup qualification matches. His final international appearance was in July 1999, with Saudi Arabia.

== Honours ==
Benfica

- Taça de Portugal: 2003–04
