= Miklós Fehér =

Hungarian footballer (1979–2004)

- Fehér with Benfica in 2003

Personal information
- Full name: Miklós Fehér
- Date of birth: 20 July 1979
- Place of birth: Tatabánya, Hungary
- Date of death: 25 January 2004 (aged 24)
- Place of death: Guimarães, Portugal
- Height: 1.85 m (6 ft 1 in)
- Position: Striker

Youth career
- Győri ETO

Senior career*
Years	Team	Apps	(Gls)
1995–1998	Győri ETO	62	(23)
1998–2002	Porto	10	(1)
1999–2002	Porto B	7	(2)
2000	→ Salgueiros (loan)	14	(5)
2000–2001	→ Braga (loan)	26	(14)
2002–2004	Benfica	30	(7)
Total		149	(52)

International career
1996–1997	Hungary U18	8	(2)
1996–2000	Hungary U21	5	(1)
1998–2003	Hungary	25	(7)
- * Club domestic league appearances and goals

Miklós "Miki" Fehér (Hungarian pronunciation: [ˈmikloːʃ ˈfɛheːr]; 20 July 1979 – 25 January 2004) was a Hungarian professional footballer who played as a striker.

Fehér spent most of his nine-year career in Portugal, representing four clubs and amassing Primeira Liga totals of 80 games and 27 goals. On 25 January 2004, he suffered a cardiac arrest during a match between Vitória de Guimarães and his team, Benfica, in Guimarães, and died later that day in hospital.

Fehér represented the Hungary national team at international level, making his debut in 1998 at the age of 19.

== Club career ==
Born in Tatabánya, Fehér started his playing career at Győri ETO, where he was spotted by Porto scouts. He was signed in 1998 but never really made a breakthrough onto the first team, being loaned to gain experience from ages 20 to 21 to another two northern sides, Salgueiros and Braga.

At Braga, Fehér had his best professional season, scoring 14 Primeira Liga goals in 26 games in 2000–01. After Porto chairman Jorge Nuno Pinto da Costa quarrelled with his agent José Veiga, the player refused to part with the latter and left, joining Lisbon side Benfica and going on to net eight official goals over two seasons.

=== Death and legacy ===
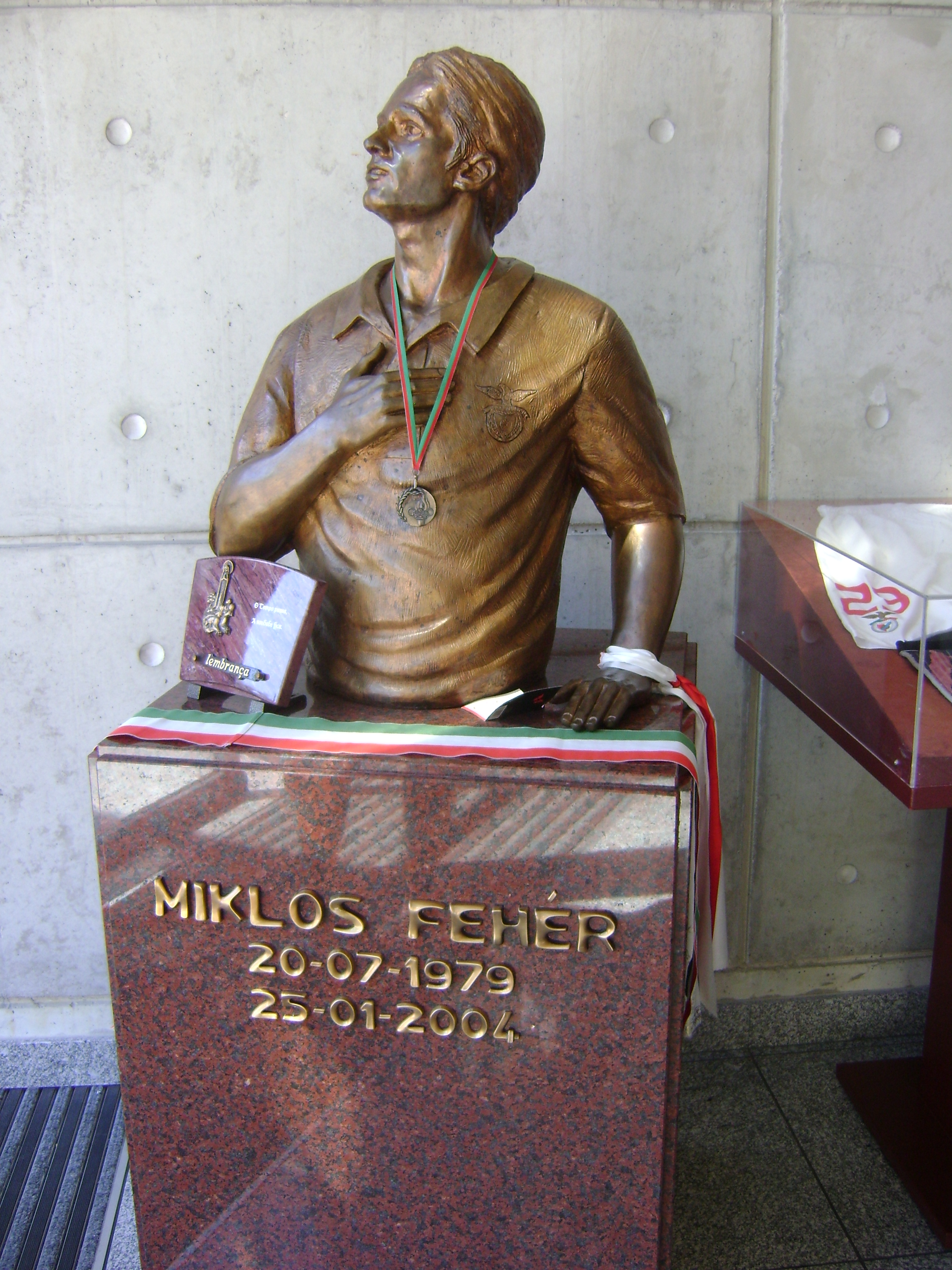
Fehér's memorial at the Estádio da Luz in Lisbon, Portugal

On 25 January 2004, Fehér was in Guimarães with Benfica to play against Vitória de Guimarães. The game was being broadcast live on television, and was goal-less when Fehér came on as a 60th minute substitute and assisted another player just off the bench, Fernando Aguiar, for the match's only goal in the first minute of additional time. Two minutes later he received a yellow card, before suddenly bending forward, seemingly in pain; he then fell backwards to the ground.

Members of both teams rushed immediately to aid Fehér before medical personnel arrived on the pitch. Cardiopulmonary resuscitation was performed, an ambulance arrived on the pitch and he was rushed to the hospital. His condition was covered by the Portuguese media throughout the day and, before midnight, his death was confirmed, the cause of death being cardiac arrhythmia brought on by hypertrophic cardiomyopathy. In his memory, Benfica retired the number 29 shirt, which he wore during his time at the club. He was remembered by many and his death caused a profound shock in Portuguese sports. Among others, Porto director of football Reinaldo Teles and manager José Mourinho paid their respects at the Estádio da Luz, where the player's body remained before his burial in his native Hungary.

Benfica's delegation, which included president Luís Filipe Vieira, coach Giovanni Trapattoni and the entire first-team squad, travelled to Hungary, presenting Fehér's parents with the 2004–05 league championship medal, in respect for the player and his time with the club. They had previously dedicated the 2003–04 Taça de Portugal trophy to him.

On 9 October 2009, the day before their 2010 FIFA World Cup qualifier against Portugal in Lisbon, the Hungary national team squad laid a wreath next to a metal bust of Fehér at Benfica's homeground, in tribute to his memory. Before a UEFA Europa Conference League game at the ground where he died, Hungarian club Puskás Akadémia FC paid tribute to him on 20 July 2022, which would have been Fehér's 43rd birthday.

He was only 24 years old when he died.

== International career ==
Fehér earned his first cap for the Hungary national team on 10 October 1998, in a UEFA Euro 2000 qualifying match against Azerbaijan. He came on as a sixth-minute substitute for Ferenc Horváth at the Tofiq Bahramov Stadium in Baku, and scored the final goal of the 4–0 win.

On 11 October 2000, Fehér netted a hat-trick in a 6–1 away rout of Lithuania for the 2002 FIFA World Cup qualifiers. In total, he scored seven goals in 25 appearances for the national team.

== Career statistics ==
=== Club ===
Appearances and goals by club, season and competition
Club	Season	League			Cup		Continental		Total	
Club	Season	Division	Apps	Goals	Apps	Goals	Apps	Goals	Apps	Goals
Győri ETO	1995–96	Nemzeti Bajnokság I	8	2			—	—	8	2
Győri ETO	1996–97	Nemzeti Bajnokság I	29	8			—	—	29	8
Győri ETO	1997–98	Nemzeti Bajnokság I	25	13			—	—	25	13
Győri ETO	Total		62	23			0	0	62	23
Porto	1998–99	Primeira Liga	5	0	2	0	1	0	8	0
Porto	1999–2000	Primeira Liga	5	1	1	0	2	0	8	1
Porto	Total		10	1	3	0	3	0	16	1
Porto B	1999–2000	Segunda Divisão	4	1	—	—	—	—	4	1
Porto B	2001–02	Segunda Divisão	3	1	—	—	—	—	3	1
Porto B	Total		7	2	0	0	0	0	7	2
Salgueiros (loan)	1999–2000	Primeira Liga	14	5	2	1	—	—	16	6
Braga (loan)	2000–01	Primeira Liga	26	14	—	—	—	—	26	14
Benfica	2002–03	Primeira Liga	17	4	1	0	—	—	18	4
Benfica	2003–04	Primeira Liga	13	3	2	0	4	1	19	4
Benfica	Total		30	7	3	0	4	1	37	8
Career total			149	52	8	1	7	1	164	54

=== International ===
Appearances and goals by national team and year
National team	Year	Apps	Goals
Hungary	1998	3	1
Hungary	1999	5	0
Hungary	2000	4	4
Hungary	2001	3	0
Hungary	2002	7	1
Hungary	2003	3	1
Total		25	7

Scores and results list Hungary's goal tally first, score column indicates score after each Fehér goal.

List of international goals scored by Miklós Fehér
No.	Date	Venue	Opponent	Score	Result	Competition
1	10 October 1998	Tofiq Bahramov, Baku, Azerbaijan	Azerbaijan	4–0	4–0	Euro 2000 qualifying
2	11 October 2000	Darius and Girėnas, Kaunas, Lithuania	Lithuania	2–0	6–1	2002 World Cup qualification
3	11 October 2000	Darius and Girėnas, Kaunas, Lithuania	Lithuania	3–0	6–1	2002 World Cup qualification
4	11 October 2000	Darius and Girėnas, Kaunas, Lithuania	Lithuania	5–1	6–1	2002 World Cup qualification
5	15 November 2000	Gradski Stadium, Skopje, Macedonia	Macedonia	1–0	1–0	Friendly
6	17 April 2002	Oláh Gábor Út, Debrecen, Hungary	Belarus	2–5	2–5	Friendly
7	20 August 2003	Fazanerija, Murska Sobota, Slovenia	Slovenia	1–2	1–2	Friendly

== Honours ==
Porto

- Primeira Liga: 1998–99
- Taça de Portugal: 1999–2000
- Supertaça Cândido de Oliveira: 1998, 1999

Benfica

- Taça de Portugal: 2003–04

Individual

- Young Hungarian Player of the Year: 1997
- Ferenc Puskás Award: 2000

== See also ==
- List of association footballers who died after on-field incidents
