= Luís Campos (football) =

Portuguese football executive (born 1964)

Personal information
- Full name: Luís Filipe Hipólito Reis Pedrosa Campos
- Date of birth: 6 September 1964 (age 62)
- Place of birth: Fão, Portugal
- Position: Right-back

Team information
- Current team: Paris Saint-Germain (Football Advisor)

Youth career
- 1980–1981: Fão
- 1981–1983: Esposende

Senior career*
Years	Team	Apps	(Gls)
1983–1984	Esposende		
1984–1985	Fão		

Managerial career
- 1992–1993: Leiria
- 1995–1996: Esposende
- 1996–1998: Aves
- 1998: Esposende
- 1998–1999: Leça
- 1999–2000: Penafiel
- 2000–2001: Gil Vicente
- 2002–2003: Vitória de Setúbal
- 2003: Varzim
- 2003–2004: Gil Vicente
- 2004–2005: Beira-Mar
- * Club domestic league appearances and goals as of 29 October 2019

Luís Filipe Hipólito Reis Pedrosa Campos (born 6 September 1964) is a Portuguese football executive and former manager who works as Football Advisor for Ligue 1 club Paris Saint-Germain.

== Career ==
As a player, Campos had a relatively short career, playing as a right-back for his local clubs Esposende and Fão.

Campos began coaching in the lower leagues of Portugal at the age of 27 with Leiria, and managed several amateur teams and eventually professional teams in the Portuguese Primeira Liga. As manager of Gil Vicente, Campos ended José Mourinho's 27-game unbeaten streak with Porto. In 2012, Campos was a scout and tactical analyst for Real Madrid under Mourinho.

Campos made his name as sporting director at Monaco from 2013 to 2016. He oversaw the transfers of Radamel Falcao, João Moutinho, James Rodríguez, Fabinho, Anthony Martial, Ricardo Carvalho, Dimitar Berbatov, Bernardo Silva, Tiémoué Bakayoko, Geoffrey Kondogbia, and Thomas Lemar amongst others. On his arrival at Monaco in 2013, Campos found academy forward Kylian Mbappé unsettled; after watching him “for 10 minutes,” he urged the player to stay, placed him with the B team and, within two months, supported his promotion to the first team. He became the sporting director of Lille in 2017. On 18 December 2020, Campos left Lille after a change of ownership at the club.

Analysts have credited Campos as the architect of the Monaco and Lille squads that won Ligue 1 in 2016–17 and 2020–21, respectively, framing his later work at PSG.

On 10 June 2022, Campos joined French champions Paris Saint-Germain (PSG) as Football Advisor. According to the club, the role of Football Advisor entails "focus on the performance, recruitment, and organisational side" of the team. Campos continued in his position as an external advisor for La Liga club Celta de Vigo. In his first transfer window at Paris Saint-Germain, he oversaw the arrivals of Vitinha, Hugo Ekitike, Nordi Mukiele, Renato Sanches, Fabián Ruiz, and Carlos Soler. On 23 December 2023, Campos ceased his duties as external advisor for Celta Vigo.

=== Scouting philosophy ===
Campos has emphasised live player evaluation—sometimes for only a few minutes—and the use of proprietary tools, including a scouting database he calls Scouting System Pro, alongside off-field profiling to understand personality and adaptation.
