= Armando Sá =

Mozambican footballer

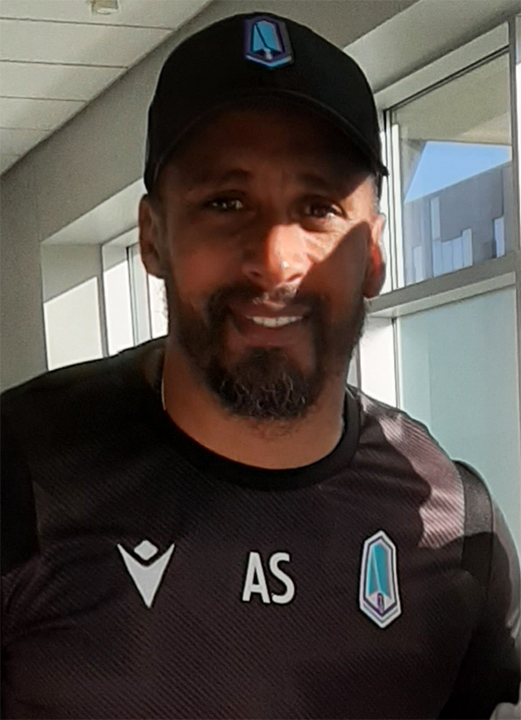
- Sá in 2022

Personal information
- Full name: Armando Miguel Correia de Sá
- Date of birth: 16 September 1975 (age 51)
- Place of birth: Maputo, Mozambique
- Height: 1.76 m (5 ft 9 in)
- Position: Right back

Youth career
- 1989–1990: São Brás
- 1990–1991: Damaiense
- 1991–1994: Belenenses

Senior career*
Years	Team	Apps	(Gls)
1994–1996	Vilafranquense	29	(1)
1996–1997	Bragança		
1997–1998	Vila Real	32	(4)
1998–2001	Rio Ave	82	(4)
2001	Braga	16	(0)
2002–2004	Benfica	48	(1)
2004–2005	Villarreal	20	(0)
2005–2007	Espanyol	20	(1)
2007	→ Leeds United (loan)	11	(0)
2007–2008	Foolad	16	(0)
2008–2009	Sepahan	35	(1)
Total		309	(12)

International career
1999–2010	Mozambique	6	(0)

Managerial career
- 2022–2026: Pacific FC (assistant)
- * Club domestic league appearances and goals

Armando Miguel Correia de Sá (born 16 September 1975) is a Mozambican football manager and former player who served as assistant coach of Canadian club Pacific FC. As a player, he played mainly as a right back.

He also held a Portuguese passport, and played professionally in four countries in a 16-year professional career: Portugal (six teams, including a two-and-a-half-year spell with Benfica), Spain, England (five months with Leeds United) and Iran.

== Club career ==
Sá was born in Maputo. After playing for most of his early career with modest Portuguese clubs he joined Rio Ave F.C. for the 1998–99 season, and his performances there attracted attention from S.C. Braga.

In December 2001, after having played with the Minho side for only four months he, alongside teammates Ricardo Rocha and Tiago, left for the Primeira Liga with S.L. Benfica. Though not an undisputed starter at the latter team, he still managed to appear in a good number of games.

Sá subsequently moved to La Liga with Villarreal CF in 2004–05, helping to a third-place finish after which he signed with fellow Spaniards RCD Espanyol. He finished 2006–07 on loan at Football League Championship's Leeds United, which eventually ranked last. He made his debut for the Yorkshire-based team as a substitute in a 1–3 away loss against West Bromwich Albion for the campaign's FA Cup, and ended up playing in several positions: right back, left back and also in midfield.

In July 2007, Sá signed for Foolad FC, who competed in Iran's second level and were led by Portuguese coach Augusto Inácio, his father-in-law. After achieving promotion in his first season he switched to another club in the country, Sepahan FC.

== International career ==
Sá was capped six times for the Mozambique national team.

== Managerial career ==
As of 2022, Sá holds UEFA A and Canada Soccer A coaching licenses. In 2019, he became the owner and technical director of PRO11 Soccer Academy in Ontario.

On 10 March 2022, Sá signed with Canadian Premier League side Pacific FC as an assistant coach.

== Honours ==
Benfica

- Taça de Portugal: 2003–04

Villarreal

- UEFA Intertoto Cup: 2004

Espanyol

- Copa del Rey: 2005–06

Sepahan

- Iran Pro League: 2009–10
