= Ricardo Rocha (footballer, born 1978) =

Portuguese footballer

Personal information
- Full name: Ricardo Sérgio Rocha Azevedo
- Date of birth: 3 October 1978 (age 48)
- Place of birth: Santo Tirso, Portugal
- Height: 1.80 m (5 ft 11 in)
- Position: Centre-back

Team information
- Current team: Benfica (assistant)

Youth career
- 1990–1995: ARC Areias
- 1995–1996: Famalicão
- 1996–1997: Vitória Guimarães

Senior career*
Years	Team	Apps	(Gls)
1997–1999	Famalicão	54	(2)
1999–2000	Braga B	35	(2)
2000–2002	Braga	44	(2)
2002–2007	Benfica	115	(3)
2007–2009	Tottenham Hotspur	14	(0)
2009–2010	Standard Liège	7	(0)
2010–2012	Portsmouth	72	(0)
2012–2013	Portsmouth	21	(0)
Total		362	(9)

International career
2001–2002	Portugal B	2	(0)
2002–2006	Portugal	6	(0)

Managerial career
- 2024–: Benfica (assistant)
- * Club domestic league appearances and goals

Ricardo Sérgio Rocha Azevedo (born 3 October 1978) is a Portuguese former professional footballer who played as a central defender.

He signed for Benfica in 2002 after starting out at Braga, going on to appear in 163 competitive matches with the former club and win three major titles, including the 2004–05 Primeira Liga. He spent the vast majority of his remaining career in England with Tottenham Hotspur and Portsmouth, for a total of three Premier League seasons.

== Club career ==
=== Portugal ===
Rocha was born in Santo Tirso, Porto District, and he started playing football as a goalkeeper. Having made a name for himself at perennial UEFA Cup qualification candidates Braga and making his Primeira Liga debut during the 1999–2000 season, he joined Benfica in January 2002 alongside teammates Armando Sá and Tiago (in Rocha's case the move was made official in June of the following year).

In his four and a half seasons in Lisbon, Rocha totalled 163 appearances and scored three goals. This included 33 games in European competitions, and he added 25 in the 2004–05 campaign to win the national championship and help put an end to an 11-year drought for the club.

On 28 March 2006, Rocha had a widely lauded performance in the UEFA Champions League quarter-finals first leg against eventual champions Barcelona, marking Ronaldinho out of the game in a 0–0 home draw and 2–0 aggregate loss.

=== Tottenham Hotspur ===
On 23 January 2007, Rocha signed a three-and-a-half-year deal with Tottenham Hotspur, for an undisclosed fee thought to be around £3.3 million. He played his first game four days later in the 3–1 win over Southend United in the fourth round of the FA Cup, in place of captain Ledley King who was injured at the time; He made his first Premier League appearance on 10 February, featuring the full 90 minutes of the 2–1 away loss against Sheffield United.

Rocha took part in just five matches in 2007–08, and none whatsoever in all competitions in the following season. He was released on 14 June 2009, after his contract expired.

=== Portsmouth ===
On 31 August 2009, Rocha moved to Belgium with Standard Liège on a one-year deal. However, his contract was terminated on 30 January 2010 and he returned to England immediately after, signing for two years with Portsmouth. He made his debut in a 5–0 defeat away to Manchester United on 6 February.

Rocha was sent off in his next two games, against Sunderland on 9 February and against Burnley. Things improved for the defender when he put in a Player of the match performance in his team's FA Cup semi-final victory over his former side Tottenham.

In summer 2010, Portsmouth offered Rocha an extension, and on 4 September he re-signed with the club, with the two-year deal being officially confirmed six days later. He was sent off in two consecutive fixtures, against Reading (2–0 loss) and Cardiff City (3–0 defeat), finishing the season with 29 league appearances as his team ranked 16th.

In 2011–12, both Rocha and Dave Kitson fell out of favor with Steve Cotterill, but the manager left for Nottingham Forest in mid-October 2011. He was awarded the team's Player of the Season award, but they were relegated to Football League One; at the end of the campaign, and upon the expiry of his contract, he was released.

In September 2012, Rocha went on trial at Ipswich Town, but nothing came of it. On 6 October, Leeds United announced that the 34-year-old had been trialling with them for ten days. On 19 November, however, he returned to Portsmouth on an initial one-month deal, extending his link for another month in January.

Rocha's future with Pompey appeared to be in doubt, after he claimed that he had received no offers for a new deal. Additionally, head coach Guy Whittingham stated that he refused to rule out retaining the player.

Rocha left Fratton Park in July 2013 after both parties were unable to reach an agreement. Chairman Iain McInnes explained his return had scuppered, due to wanting a role for "off-the-field role on top of a playing deal by becoming the club's director of football."

== International career ==
After making his debut for Portugal on 20 November 2002 against Scotland, Rocha returned for a friendly with Denmark and a UEFA Euro 2008 qualifier against Finland after a three-year absence, as he was not a regular starter at Benfica then; he won the third of his six caps in the former match, a 4–2 loss in Copenhagen.

== Coaching career ==
Rocha returned to Benfica in summer 2024, being appointed assistant manager in Roger Schmidt's staff. The German was dismissed shortly after, but Rocha kept his role under new coach Bruno Lage.

== Career statistics ==
=== Club ===
Appearances and goals by club, season and competition
Club	Season	League		National cup (Note: Includes FA Cup)		League cup (Note: Includes Football League Cup)		Other (Note: Includes Football League Trophy, Supertaça Cândido de Oliveira, UEFA Champions League and UEFA Cup)		Total	
Club	Season	Apps	Goals	Apps	Goals	Apps	Goals	Apps	Goals	Apps	Goals
Braga	2000–01	19	0	0	0	0	0	–		19	0
Braga	2001–02	25	2	0	0	0	0	–		25	2
Braga	Total	44	2	0	0	0	0	0	0	44	2
Benfica	2002–03	27	0	0	0	0	0	–		27	0
Benfica	2003–04	25	0	4	0	0	0	10	0	39	0
Benfica	2004–05	25	0	5	0	0	0	7	0	37	0
Benfica	2005–06	26	0	4	0	0	0	10	0	40	0
Benfica	2006–07	12	3	1	0	0	0	7	0	20	3
Benfica	Total	115	3	14	0	0	0	34	0	163	3
Tottenham Hotspur	2006–07	9	0	3	0	1	0	0	0	13	0
Tottenham Hotspur	2007–08	5	0	0	0	0	0	0	0	5	0
Tottenham Hotspur	2008–09	0	0	0	0	0	0	0	0	0	0
Tottenham Hotspur	Total	14	0	3	0	1	0	0	0	18	0
Standard Liège	2009–10	7	0	2	0	–		4	0	13	0
Portsmouth	2009–10	10	0	2	0	0	0	–		12	0
Portsmouth	2010–11	29	0	0	0	0	0	–		29	0
Portsmouth	2011–12	33	0	1	0	1	0	–		35	0
Portsmouth	2012–13	21	0	0	0	0	0	–		21	0
Portsmouth	Total	93	0	3	0	1	0	0	0	97	0
Career total		273	5	22	0	2	0	38	0	335	5

=== International ===
Appearances and goals by national team and year
National team	Year	Apps	Goals
Portugal	2002	1	0
Portugal	2003	1	0
Portugal	2006	4	0
Total		6	0

== Honours ==
Benfica

- Primeira Liga: 2004–05
- Taça de Portugal: 2003–04
- Supertaça Cândido de Oliveira: 2005

Portsmouth

- FA Cup runner-up: 2009–10

Individual

- Portsmouth Player of The Season: 2011–12
