= Miguel Monteiro =

Portuguese footballer (born 1980)

Miguel
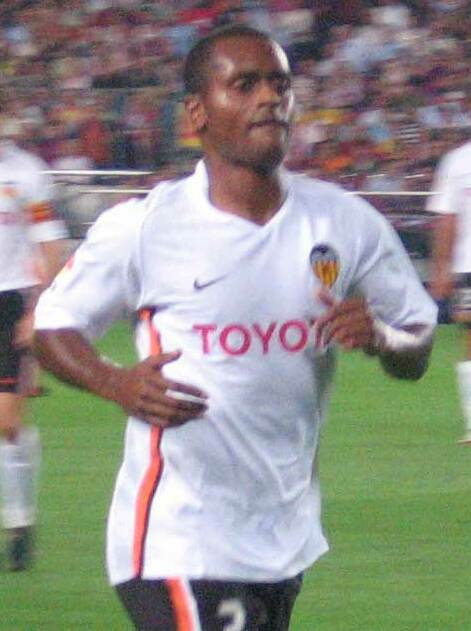
- Miguel with Valencia in 2006

Personal information
- Full name: Luís Miguel Brito Garcia Monteiro
- Date of birth: 4 January 1980 (age 46)
- Place of birth: Lisbon, Portugal
- Height: 1.75 m (5 ft 9 in)
- Positions: Right-back; winger

Youth career
- 1989–1994: Sporting CP
- 1994: Alverca
- 1995: Loures
- 1995–1996: Olhanense
- 1996–1999: Estrela Amadora

Senior career*
Years	Team	Apps	(Gls)
1999–2000	Estrela Amadora	32	(0)
2000–2005	Benfica	131	(12)
2002	Benfica B	2	(2)
2005–2012	Valencia	175	(2)
Total		340	(16)

International career
2000–2002	Portugal U21	22	(5)
2003–2010	Portugal	59	(1)
Medal record
Men's football
Representing Portugal
UEFA European Championship
Runner-up	2004 Portugal
- * Club domestic league appearances and goals

Luís Miguel Brito Garcia Monteiro OIH (born 4 January 1980), known simply as Miguel (Portuguese pronunciation: [miˈɣɛl]), is a Portuguese former professional footballer who played as a right-back or a winger.

He spent the vast majority of his career with Benfica (five seasons) and Valencia (seven), appearing in 161 official matches for the first club and 239 for the second while winning four major titles.

Miguel earned 59 caps for Portugal in the 2000s and represented the country at two World Cups and as many European Championships.

== Club career ==
=== Early years and Benfica ===
Born in Lisbon of Bissau-Guinean and Cape Verdean descent, Miguel started his senior career with local C.F. Estrela da Amadora as a winger, having previously spent five years at Sporting CP's youth system and being released for being too short. On 30 April 1999, he made his first-team debut by playing 17 minutes in a 2–1 away loss against Boavista FC, then added 28 Primeira Liga appearances in his only full season as the capital club retained its top-division status.

Miguel moved to S.L. Benfica in summer 2000, making the transition to right midfielder and then right-back (by the hand of former Benfica player Fernando Chalana, in his only game as a transition coach) – the position that ultimately brought him international recognition. In the 2004–05 campaign, he contributed 22 matches and two goals to a national championship conquest after an 11-year wait.

=== Valencia ===
Miguel joined Valencia CF in August 2005, for a €7.5 million fee. Fully established as first choice, he signed a new five-year deal in September 2007, and helped the Che to win the Copa del Rey the following year, playing in the final 3–1 win against Getafe CF.

In 2009–10, Miguel was challenged by new signing Bruno. He still appeared in 25 matches as Valencia finished third and returned to the UEFA Champions League.

In May 2012, following several occasions where he displayed unprofessional behaviour, Miguel's contract expired and he was released. In 2014, he started practising with the SJPF (syndicate of professional football players) alongside other unemployed players to regain fitness.

== International career ==
A Portugal international since making his debut against Italy on 12 February 2003, Miguel was a member of the squad when the country hosted UEFA Euro 2004. Initially a backup to Paulo Ferreira, coach Luiz Felipe Scolari made him the starting right-back in a reorganised defence after a 2–1 loss to Greece in the opening game; he withdrew injured in the first half of the final, a 1–0 defeat to the same team.

Miguel started every match at the 2006 FIFA World Cup before going off with an injury in the 1–0 semi-final loss against France. He backed up José Bosingwa in Euro 2008, and only appeared in the 2–0 group stage defeat to co-hosts Switzerland.

Picked for the 2010 World Cup in South Africa – in spite of an irregular season at Valencia – Miguel was one of three right-backs used during Portugal's four games in the competition, appearing in the group stage 7–0 win over North Korea. In September 2010, the 30-year-old announced his retirement from international duty.

== Career statistics ==
=== Club ===
Appearances and goals by club, season and competition
Club	League	Season	League		Cup		Europe		Other		Total	
Club	League	Season	Apps	Goals	Apps	Goals	Apps	Goals	Apps	Goals	Apps	Goals
Estrela Amadora	Primeira Liga	1998–99	4	0	0	0	–		–		4	0
Estrela Amadora	Primeira Liga	1999–00	28	0	2	0	–		–		30	0
Estrela Amadora	Total		32	0	2	0	0	0	0	0	34	0
Benfica	Primeira Liga	2000–01	23	1	2	0	1	1	–		26	2
Benfica	Primeira Liga	2001–02	27	6	2	0	–		–		29	6
Benfica	Primeira Liga	2002–03	29	1	0	0	–		–		29	1
Benfica	Primeira Liga	2003–04	30	2	5	0	10	0	–		45	2
Benfica	Primeira Liga	2004–05	22	2	4	0	5	0	1	0	32	2
Benfica	Total		131	12	13	0	16	1	1	0	161	13
Valencia	La Liga	2005–06	31	1	4	1	0	0	–		35	2
Valencia	La Liga	2006–07	30	0	3	0	9	0	–		42	0
Valencia	La Liga	2007–08	26	1	4	0	6	0	–		36	1
Valencia	La Liga	2008–09	28	0	3	0	4	0	2	0	37	0
Valencia	La Liga	2009–10	25	0	3	0	10	0	–		38	0
Valencia	La Liga	2010–11	24	0	2	0	4	0	–		30	0
Valencia	La Liga	2011–12	11	0	5	0	6	0	–		22	0
Valencia	Total		175	2	24	0	38	1	2	0	239	3
Career total			338	14	39	0	54	2	3	0	434	16

=== International goal ===
International goal scored by Miguel Monteiro
Goal	Date	Venue	Opponent	Score	Result	Competition
1	11 October 2003	Estádio do Restelo, Lisbon, Portugal	Albania	5–3	5–3	Friendly

== Honours ==
Benfica

- Primeira Liga: 2004–05
- Taça de Portugal: 2003–04
- Supertaça Cândido de Oliveira: 2005

Valencia

- Copa del Rey: 2007–08

Portugal

- UEFA European Championship runner-up: 2004

Portugal Under-18

- UEFA European Under-19 Championship: 1999

=== Orders ===
- Medal of Merit, Order of the Immaculate Conception of Vila Viçosa (House of Braganza)
