= 2004–05 Primeira Liga =

71st season of top-tier Portuguese football

Primeira Liga
- Season: 2004–05
- Dates: 28 August 2004 – 22 May 2005
- Champions: Benfica; 31st title
- Relegated: Moreirense; Estoril; Beira-Mar
- Champions League: Benfica; Porto; Sporting CP
- UEFA Cup: Braga; Vitória de Guimarães; Vitória de Setúbal
- Matches: 306
- Goals: 711 (2.32 per match)
- Top goalscorer: Liédson (25 goals)
- Biggest home win: Sporting CP 6–1 Boavista (13 November 2004)
- Biggest away win: 0–4 (3 times)
- Highest scoring: Sporting CP 6–1 Boavista (13 November 2004)

The 2004–05 Primeira Liga was the 71st edition of top flight of Portuguese football. It started on 28 August 2004 with a match between Belenenses and Marítimo, and ended on 22 May 2005.

Benfica won their 31st league title, with 65 points, three points ahead of the defending champions Porto. The league was contested by 18 clubs, and was considered one of the most competitive seasons in recent years.

The first goal of the season was scored by Belenenses centre-back Rolando. The first red card of the season was given to Vitória de Setúbal's Bruno Ribeiro, and the first yellow was given to Belenenses' Juninho Petrolina in the opening match of the season. Benfica and Porto were both qualified for the 2005–06 UEFA Champions League group stage, and Sporting CP qualified for the UEFA Champions League qualifying round. At the bottom of the table, Moreirense, Estoril and Beira-Mar were relegated to the Liga de Honra. Liédson was the top scorer with 25 goals.

== Promotion and relegation ==
=== Teams relegated to Liga de Honra ===
- Alverca
- Paços de Ferreira
- Estrela da Amadora

Alverca, Paços de Ferreira, and Estrela da Amadora were consigned to the Liga de Honra following their final classification in 2003–04 season.

=== Teams promoted from Liga de Honra ===
- Estoril
- Vitória de Setúbal
- Penafiel

The other three teams were replaced by Estoril, Vitória de Setúbal, and Penafiel from the Liga de Honra.

== Teams ==
=== Team summaries ===
Location of teams in the 2004-05 Liga
Location of teams in the '2004-05 Liga

Club	Head coach	City	Stadium	2003–2004 season
Académica de Coimbra	(Portugal) João Carlos Pereira	Coimbra	Estádio Cidade de Coimbra	13th
Belenenses	(Portugal) Carlos Carvalhal	Lisbon	Estádio do Restelo	15th
Benfica	(Italy) Giovanni Trapattoni	Lisbon	Estádio da Luz	2nd
Boavista	(Portugal) Jaime Pacheco	Porto	Estádio do Bessa – Século XXI	8th
Braga	(Portugal) Jesualdo Ferreira	Braga	Estádio Municipal de Braga - AXA	5th
Estoril	(Portugal) Litos	Estoril	Estádio António Coimbra da Mota	1st in the Liga de Honra
Gil Vicente	(Portugal) Luís Campos	Barcelos	Estádio Cidade de Barcelos	12th
União de Leiria	(Portugal) Vítor Pontes	Leiria	Estádio Dr. Magalhães Pessoa	10th
Penafiel	(Portugal) Manuel Fernandes	Penafiel	Estádio Municipal 25 de Abril	3rd in the Liga de Honra
Marítimo	(Portugal) Manuel Cajuda	Funchal	Estádio dos Barreiros	6th
Nacional	(Brazil) Casemiro Mior	Funchal	Estádio da Madeira	4th
Beira-Mar	(England) Mick Wadsworth	Aveiro	Estádio Municipal de Aveiro	11th
Moreirense	(Portugal) Vítor Oliveira	Guimarães	Estádio do Moreirense	9th
Porto	(Italy) Luigi Delneri	Porto	Estádio do Dragão	1st
Sporting CP	(Portugal) José Peseiro	Lisbon	Estádio José Alvalade – Século XXI	3rd
Rio Ave	(Portugal) Carlos Brito	Vila do Conde	Estádio dos Arcos	7th
Vitória de Guimarães	(Portugal) Manuel Machado	Guimarães	Estádio D. Afonso Henriques	14th
Vitória de Setúbal	(Portugal) José Couceiro	Setúbal	Estádio do Bonfim	2nd in the Liga de Honra

=== Managerial changes ===
Team	Outgoing manage	Manner	Date of vacancy	Incoming manager	Date of appointment
Porto	(Italy) Luigi Delneri	Sacked	7 August 2004	(Spain) Víctor Fernández	11 August 2004
Porto	(Spain) Víctor Fernández	Sacked	1 February 2005	(Portugal) José Couceiro	1 February 2005
Boavista	(Portugal) Jaime Pacheco	Resigned	1 May 2005	(Portugal) Pedro Barny	1 May 2005

Team	Outgoing manager	Replaced by
Marítimo	(Portugal) Manuel Cajuda	(Portugal) Mariano Barreto
Vitória de Setúbal	(Portugal) José Couceiro	(Portugal) José Rachão
Penafiel	(Portugal) Manuel Fernandes	(Portugal) Luís Castro
Nacional	(Brazil) Casemiro Mior	(Portugal) João Carlos Pereira
Gil Vicente	(Portugal) Luís Campos	(Portugal) Ulisses Morais
Académica de Coimbra	(Portugal) João Carlos Pereira	(Portugal) Nelo Vingada
Moreirense	(Portugal) Vítor Oliveira	(Portugal) Jorge Jesus
Beira-Mar	(England) Mick Wadsworth	(Portugal) Luís Campos
Beira-Mar	(Portugal) Luís Campos	(Portugal) Augusto Inácio

== League table ==
Pos	Team	Pld	W	D	L	GF	GA	GD	Pts	Qualification or relegation
1	Benfica (C)	34	19	8	7	51	31	+20	65	Qualification to Champions League group stage
2	Porto	34	17	11	6	39	26	+13	62	Qualification to Champions League group stage
3	Sporting CP	34	18	7	9	66	36	+30	61	Qualification to Champions League third qualifying round
4	Braga	34	16	10	8	45	28	+17	58	Qualification to UEFA Cup first round
5	Vitória de Guimarães	34	15	9	10	38	29	+9	54	Qualification to UEFA Cup first round
6	Boavista	34	13	11	10	39	43	−4	50	
7	Marítimo	34	12	13	9	39	32	+7	49	
8	Rio Ave	34	10	17	7	35	35	0	47	
9	Belenenses	34	13	7	14	38	34	+4	46	
10	Vitória de Setúbal	34	11	11	12	46	45	+1	44	Qualification to UEFA Cup first round (Note: Vitória de Setúbal qualified for the UEFA Cup as Portuguese Cup winners)
11	Penafiel	34	13	4	17	39	53	−14	43	
12	Nacional	34	12	5	17	46	48	−2	41	
13	Gil Vicente	34	11	7	16	34	40	−6	40	
14	Académica	34	9	11	14	29	41	−12	38	
15	União de Leiria	34	8	14	12	29	36	−7	38	Qualification to Intertoto Cup third round
16	Moreirense (R)	34	7	13	14	30	43	−13	34	Relegation to Liga de Honra
17	Estoril (R)	34	8	6	20	38	55	−17	30	Relegation to Liga de Honra
18	Beira-Mar (R)	34	6	12	16	30	56	−26	30	Relegation to Liga de Honra

Source: Foradejogo
Rules for classification: 1) points; 2) head-to-head points; 3) head-to-head goal difference; 4) goal difference; 5) number of goals scored
(C) Champions; (R) Relegated

== Results ==
Home \ Away	ACA	BEM	BEL	BEN	BOA	BRA	ESP	GVI	MAR	MOR	NAC	PEN	POR	RAV	SCP	ULE	VGU	VSE
Académica		1–1	1–1	0–1	1–0	2–2	1–0	2–1	1–0	0–4	1–0	4–1	0–0	0–0	2–3	0–1	0–2	3–3
Beira-Mar	0–0		3–3	2–3	1–0	1–4	2–1	1–0	2–2	1–3	0–3	1–3	0–1	0–0	2–2	0–1	2–2	1–1
Belenenses	0–0	2–0		4–1	1–2	1–2	3–0	0–1	3–0	5–0	1–0	4–1	0–1	2–1	1–0	2–1	1–0	0–0
Benfica	3–0	0–2	1–0		4–0	0–0	2–1	2–0	4–3	2–0	2–1	1–0	0–1	3–3	1–0	1–1	2–1	4–0
Boavista	1–0	3–0	2–0	1–1		1–2	0–0	2–2	3–2	1–1	1–0	2–1	1–0	0–1	0–4	0–0	2–1	1–1
Braga	2–0	1–1	2–0	0–0	3–0		2–0	2–1	1–1	0–0	3–2	0–1	1–1	3–0	0–3	1–0	1–0	2–3
Estoril Praia	0–1	5–0	1–0	1–2	3–3	0–1		2–0	0–1	2–0	2–0	3–2	1–2	0–0	1–4	1–1	0–1	2–1
Gil Vicente	0–1	2–0	1–0	1–1	0–1	0–1	2–0		1–0	3–1	3–2	0–1	0–2	3–1	0–3	1–1	1–3	2–1
Marítimo	1–1	0–0	0–0	1–1	2–1	2–0	2–1	1–1		1–0	2–1	3–0	1–1	1–1	3–0	2–0	1–2	3–1
Moreirense	1–0	0–0	0–1	1–2	1–1	2–1	1–2	1–0	1–0		3–2	2–2	1–1	0–0	1–3	0–0	0–0	2–2
Nacional	2–1	2–1	2–0	0–1	0–2	1–0	4–1	0–0	1–1	4–1		1–3	2–2	0–0	3–2	0–3	1–0	1–3
Penafiel	3–1	2–1	0–0	1–0	1–1	1–0	2–1	1–3	0–1	1–0	0–1		1–2	1–1	0–3	3–0	1–3	1–4
Porto	1–1	0–1	3–0	1–1	0–1	1–3	2–2	1–0	1–0	1–0	0–4	2–0		1–1	3–0	1–1	0–0	2–1
Rio Ave	3–1	1–1	3–3	1–0	2–2	1–1	2–1	0–1	0–0	1–0	4–1	1–0	0–2		0–0	2–0	1–1	1–0
Sporting CP	0–0	1–0	2–0	2–1	6–1	0–0	4–0	3–2	0–1	4–1	2–4	0–2	2–0	5–0		2–2	1–0	1–1
União de Leiria	1–2	5–1	1–0	1–0	0–3	0–0	4–2	1–1	0–0	0–0	1–0	1–2	0–1	0–3	0–0		0–1	0–2
Vitória de Guimarães	2–1	1–0	1–0	1–2	2–0	1–0	1–0	2–1	1–1	0–0	1–1	2–1	0–1	0–0	2–4	1–1		3–1
Vitória de Setúbal	1–0	1–2	1–2	0–2	0–0	1–4	2–2	0–0	2–0	2–2	1–0	4–0	0–1	2–0	2–0	1–1	1–0	

Source: Foradejogo (in Portuguese)
Legend: Blue = home team win; Yellow = draw; Red = away team win.

== Top goal scorers ==
Rank	Scorer	Goals	Team
1	(Brazil) Liédson	25	Sporting CP
2	(Portugal) João Tomás	15	Braga
2	(Portugal) Simão	15	Benfica
4	(Brazil) Wesley	14	Penafiel
5	(Gabon) Henry Antchouet	12	Belenenses
6	(South Africa) Benni McCarthy	11	Porto
6	(Cameroon) Albert Meyong	11	Vitória de Setúbal
8	(Portugal) Zé Manel	10	Boavista
9	(Brazil) Pena	9	Maritimo
9	(Brazil) Roberto	9	Penafiel

== Awards ==
=== Footballer of the Year ===
The Footballer of the Year award was won by the Portuguese Ricardo Quaresma of Porto.

=== Portuguese Golden Shoe ===
The Portuguese Golden Shoe award was won by the Brazilian Liédson of Sporting CP, scoring 25 goals.

== Attendances ==
#	Club	Average
1	Porto	36,038
2	Benfica	35,053
3	Sporting	29,887
4	Vitória SC	15,199
5	Braga	11,303
6	Académica	9,357
7	Boavista	9,137
8	Beira-Mar	6,317
9	Vitória FC	5,412
10	União de Leiria	5,061
11	Gil Vicente	4,431
12	Penafiel	4,118
13	Os Belenenses	4,029
14	Marítimo	3,882
15	Rio Ave	3,618
16	Estoril	3,312
17	Moreirense	3,218
18	CD Nacional	1,859
