= 2005–06 S.L. Benfica season =

Benfica
2005–06 season
- President: Luís Filipe Vieira
- Head coach: Ronald Koeman
- Stadium: Estádio da Luz
- Primeira Liga: 3rd
- Taça de Portugal: Quarter-finals
- Supertaça Cândido de Oliveira: Winners
- UEFA Champions League: Quarter-finals
- Top goalscorer: League: Nuno Gomes (15); All: Nuno Gomes (17)
- Highest home attendance: 65,000 v Barcelona (28 March 2006)
- Lowest home attendance: 18,000 v Nacional (8 February 2006)
- Biggest win: Benfica 4–0 União de Leiria (18 September 2005)
- Biggest defeat: 2 goal difference in 6 matches
Home colours	Away colours

The 2005–06 European football season was the 102nd season of Sport Lisboa e Benfica's existence and the club's 72nd consecutive season in the top flight of Portuguese football. The season ran from 1 July 2005 to 30 June 2006; Benfica competed domestically in the Primeira Liga and the Taça de Portugal and also participated in the UEFA Champions League as a result of finishing first in the Primeira Liga the previous season.

After Giovanni Trapattoni led Benfica to their first league title in 11 years, he resigned for personal reasons. To replace him, the club hired Ronald Koeman, who was assisted by Bruins Slot and Fernando Chalana. Benfica remained highly active in the transfer market, signing and releasing over twelve players. Noticeable additions were Anderson, Léo and Nélson to the back four; Karagounis and Miccoli to the offence. The departures included Miguel, the biggest loss.

Benfica started the domestic season by winning their fourth Supertaça Cândido de Oliveira, beating Vitória de Setúbal one-nil. In the Primeira Liga, Benfica struggled initially, making their worst entry ever. Results improved following a European win against Lille, with Benfica climbing several places and defeating Porto in the Clássico. In late October, the team experienced a drop in form, going a month without a win. In December, Benfica's results improved in December, qualifying for the knockout stages of the UEFA Champions League for the first time in eleven years and winning nearly ten matches in a row, allowing them to get within three points of the top of the league.

In the final match of January, Benfica lost to Sporting CP and underwent another erratic period, losing two more league matches in February. A home win against Liverpool motivated them; they beat Porto and eliminated the reigning title-holders from the Champions League. This success was not replicated domestically; in mid-March, Benfica lost further ground in the Primeira Liga and were eliminated from the Portuguese Cup. Koeman's side recovered, but they were eliminated by Barcelona from the Champions League and failed to overtake Sporting when they dropped seven points in three match-days. At the end of the season, Koeman left the club by mutual consent.

== Season summary ==
=== Pre-season ===
After leading Benfica to their first league title in ten seasons, Giovanni Trapattoni departed the club for personal reasons. Faced with the task of finding a new manager for a second year in a row, Luís Filipe Vieira was quick to choose Trapattoni's successor; on the 5 June 2005, he said, "I already know who's the next manager". From the list of available managers, the press speculated on Paul Le Guen, Ronald Koeman and Javier Irureta. After a failed approach to Le Guen, Benfica selected Koeman as the next manager on 8 June 2005. His assistant would be Tonny Bruins Slot, replacing Álvaro Magalhães, who left the club after two seasons. Later in the month, Fernando Chalana returned to Benfica on a 2-year contract to serve on Koeman's technical staff.

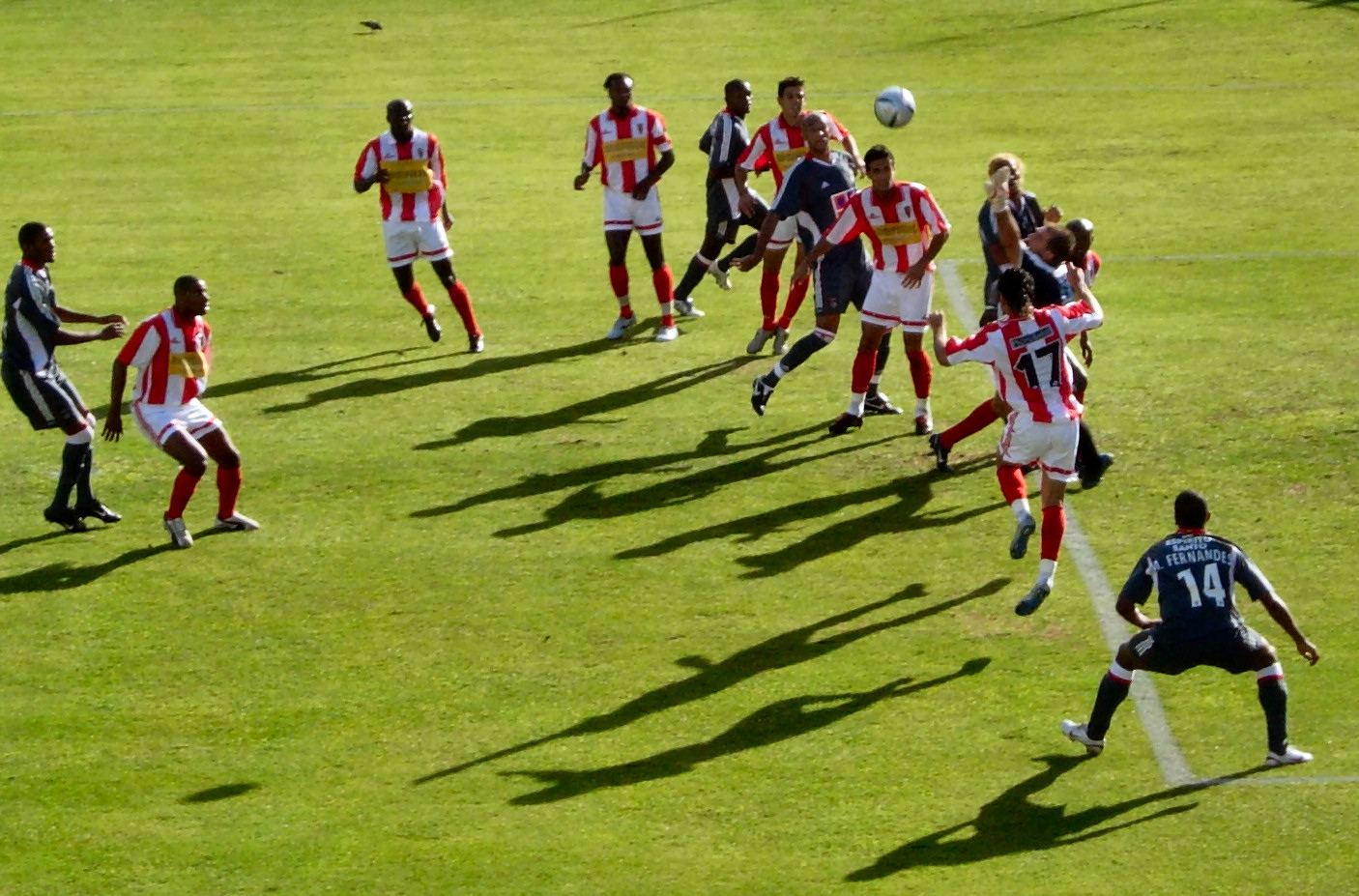
Benfica playing a pre-season match with Barreirense on 27 July

To replace the "Italian" style of Trapattoni, Koeman wanted Benfica to have a "Dutch" approach; he said, "A team like Benfica always has to play to win. In what I know of this team, we can perfectly play in a 4–3–3," and that finding the right balance between offence and defence in the playing style mattered. Vital to his new formation, Koeman asked for more wingers, such as Andy van der Meyde, and Boudewijn Zenden, but Benfica did not sign them. Instead, he received attacking midfielders Diego Souza, Andrei Karyaka and Giorgos Karagounis. To improve Koeman's options up-front, composed of Nuno Gomes and Mantorras, Benfica tried but failed to sign Jon Dahl Tomasson. Koeman instead received Italian international Fabrizio Miccoli on loan from Juventus. In defence, Benfica added Brazilians Anderson, Léo, with Nélson replacing Miguel, who moved to Valencia.

The pre-season began on 4 July 2005 with medical exams, followed by the first training session on the next day, with two thousand supporters present at the Estádio da Luz. On 6 July, Benfica travelled to Nyon for a pre-season tour until 14 July. During the eight days in Switzerland, Benfica defeated Sion and Étoile Carouge. Back in Portugal, Benfica faced two Premier League opponents, losing to Chelsea, and defeating West Bromwich. Afterwards, Benfica played three Portuguese teams, winning against Barreirense and Estoril Praia, and drawing with Vitória de Guimarães. They ended their pre-season with a presentation match against Juventus on 6 August, losing 2–0.

=== August–September ===
Benfica began their season with the 2005 Super Cup, trying to win the trophy for the fourth time. On the 13 August, Benfica faced Vitória de Setúbal at the Estádio Algarve, winning 1–0 with a goal from Nuno Gomes. It was the first win in 15 years since 1989, breaking a five-time losing streak, all against Porto. Koeman praised his players, saying, "We played very well. I am happy with the work I have done with my players". On 20 August, Benfica began their title defence with an away game at the Estádio Cidade de Coimbra. The home team, Académica, held the score to 0–0 and won a point against Benfica. After the match, Koeman said Benfica had struggled in Coimbra. On 26 August, Benfica took part in the draw for the group stage of the 2005–06 UEFA Champions League; their first in the new century because they failed to qualify in the past two seasons. In 2005 the club ranked 57th in the UEFA coefficient, thus placing them on pot 4. They were drawn in Group D with Manchester United, Villarreal and Lille. The following day, Benfica hosted Gil Vicente for their final match in August. An unusual 3–4–3 formation did not work as planned; Benfica lost 2–0 and posted their worst league start since 1976–77. Koeman blamed anxiety in the players after Simão missed a penalty.

After an international break of nearly two weeks, Benfica returned to competition on 10 September with a Lisbon derby against Sporting CP. Koeman played the same 3–4–3 as before, selecting Carlitos for the starting 11 in place of Nuno Gomes. Sporting scored first through Luís Loureiro in the first half, but Simão equalized with a free-kick in the second half. In the 75th minute, Liédson made the score 2–1 against a ten-man Benfica, ultimately winning the match for Sporting. With two losses and a draw in three match-days, Koeman broke a club record for the worst season start in history, already eight points from the top of the league. Four days later, Benfica made their seasonal European debut in the Champions League against Lille. The match was well fought between both teams, with Fabrizio Miccoli scoring a winning goal for Benfica in the 92nd minute. Koeman later said in the post-match interview, "We deserved this win because we search for it". On 18 September, Benfica hosted União de Leiria; Koeman reverted to the 4–2–3–1 formation that Giovanni Trapattoni regularly used. Benfica won 4–0 in the largest win all season, with Nuno Gomes netting a hat-trick. Koeman classified the formation as "ideal," and sid he wanted to use it more often in the future. The following Saturday, Benfica played on the road against Penafiel. A strong start put Benfica in the lead by 2–0 in the first 15 minutes, and despite conceding a goal, they won the match 3–1. Koeman attributed the win to the good momentum that Fabrizio Miccoli–Nuno Gomes were passing. On 27 September, Benfica travelled to Old Trafford to play Manchester United on the second match-day of the Champions League. United scored first through a Ryan Giggs free-kick that deflected off the wall; Simão levelled the score in the second half—also on a free kick—but United responded with a winning goal in the 85th minute through Ruud van Nistelrooy.

=== October–November ===
October began with a home match against Vitória de Guimarães. Miccoli opened the scoring for Benfica in the 20th minute, but Tiago Targino equalized a few minutes later. Simão put Benfica back in front with a deflected shot that beat Márcio Paiva, ensuring a third consecutive win that reduced the distance to the league leader to four points. After another interruption for international football, Benfica returned to competition with a Clássico against Porto. Despite Porto being the favourite to win, Benfica won 2–0 with two goals from Nuno Gomes. It was Benfica's first away win at Porto since 1990–91, when César Brito also scored a double. On the following Thursday, Benfica visited El Madrigal to play Villarreal. On the half-hour mark, Benfica lost their goalkeeper Quim to injury and replaced him with the 19-year-old Rui Nereu. In the second half, Villarreal scored from the penalty spot. Five minutes later, Manuel Fernandes levelled the score again. The draw allowed Benfica to remain in second place in Group D; Koeman was confident he could beat the Spaniards at home. On 22 October, Benfica hosted Estrela da Amadora for the Primeira Liga. Two second-half goals by Karyaka and then Nuno Gomes, gave Benfica their fifth consecutive win in the competition. Four days later, Benfica made their Portuguese Cup debut in the fourth round. Playing in Estádio do Bessa against Leixões, Simão's decisive performance opened the scoring in the 11th minute and scored Benfica's second goal that made the score 2–1. The month ended with an away match against Naval. Benfica were surprised by the home side and dropped two points in a 1–1 draw, costing them the chance to reach second place. Koeman was unhappy with the result, saying Benfica played better and deserved to win.

Benfica began November with a home match against to Villarreal. Benfica were hoping to win and take the lead in Group D but were defeated 1–0 with a winning goal for Villarreal in the 81st minute through a 30 m (98 ft) strike from Marcos Senna. Despite the loss, Koeman remained confident in the qualification for the knockout stage; he said, "It is a very balanced group. We are missing four points to progress." On 6 November, Benfica played Rio Ave at home. The match was unusually competitive, with Benfica trailing twice and avoiding defeat with two free kicks from Petit. Koeman took the blame but criticized the referee's assistant for making several mistakes against Benfica. After a third international break, Benfica visited the Municipal de Braga on 19 November to play Braga. Benfica scored first through Anderson but could not prevent the comeback of Braga, first through Césinha and then Julio Bevacqua. Benfica responded with a Nuno Gomes goal in the 92nd minute, but Bevacqua gave the win to Braga three minutes later. It was Benfica's fourth consecutive winless game, the worst spell of the season. Three days later, Benfica played Lille on the road for match-day five of the group stage. Koeman surprised with a highly defensive team composed of four centre-backs in the back-four, two defensive midfielders, two fullbacks playing in the midfield and only two offensive players, Miccoli and Nuno Gomes. The match ended 0–0, achieving Koeman's goal of securing a point. For the final game of the month, Benfica received Belenenses on 27 November. They were unable to beat Belenenses' keeper, dropping two points in a 0–0 draw and extending their winless run to six matches, the longest dry spell since 2001–02.

=== December–January ===
On 3 December, Benfica travelled to Barreiros to play Marítimo. Under pressure from the run of poor results, Koeman asked his players to give it all to beat Maritímo. Benfica fended off Marítimo attacks, responding with a goal through Mantorras in the 86th minute and winning for the first time since 26 October. Four days later, Benfica hosted Manchester United for the last match of the group stage. United's Paul Scholes scored first but ten minutes later, Geovanni equalized 1–1 and in the 34th minute, Beto fired a shot from outside the box to make it 2–1. The result was unchanged and Benfica qualified in second for the knockout stages for the first time since 1994–95. On 11 December, Benfica played Boavista at home. Anderson scored for Benfica off a corner-kick from Petit; the only goal of the game. Koeman was happy with the win, saying, "We played well, as did the fans, who supported us. Like this, it is very difficult to beat us." On 17 December, Benfica continued their winning run, beating Nacional 1–0 with a goal from Nuno Gomes. The goal was controversial because of an alleged infraction of Luisão over Diego Benaglio prior to the goal. Koeman said, "I agree that it should have been signalled, like it should have been in many other instances". Benfica ended 2005 with an away visit to the Estádio do Bonfim. They struggled to beat Vitória de Setúbal's goalkeeper Marcelo Moretto throughout the game, only securing the win in the 90th minute through Nuno Gomes. The win was Benfica's fifth in December; enough to place them third in the league table just before the Christmas break.

Competition resumed on 8 January with a home game against Paços de Ferreira. New signing Moretto made his first appearance for Benfica. Nélson scored early, putting Benfica in the lead, with Geovanni setting the final score in the second half. With the win, Benfica climbed to second place, four points ahead of Sporting but ten behind leaders Porto. On 11 January, Benfica played Tourizense for the 2005–06 Portuguese Cup. Recently signed Laurent Robert scored the opening goal in the second half, while Nuno Gomes scored a second, letting Benfica progress to the sixth round. Four days later, Benfica hosted Académica at home. Early in the match, Roberto Brum touched the ball with his hand inside the box, giving Simão the opportunity to score the first goal; two more goals in the second half secured a comfortable 3–0 win for Benfica. The following day, Benfica signed Académica striker Marcel on a six-month loan. On 20 January, Benfica played away to Gil Vicente. A 10th-minute goal from Nandinho meant Benfica trailed for the first time in the season at the quarter-hour mark. The Lisbon-side responded with two first-half goals from Simão and Geovanni, while an own-goal in the second half confirmed the win for Benfica. It was their seventh consecutive league win, a feat not seen in 11 years since the 1994–95 season. On 28 January, Benfica played the Lisbon derby against Sporting CP. Benfica scored first through Simão but they could not stop Paulo Bento's team from winning the match 3–1 at the Luz. Koeman said, "Sporting was much better on the pitch, before the 1–0 and especially after".

=== February–March ===
Entering the decisive part of the season, and still present in all competitions, Benfica's first game of February was a visit to Estádio Dr. Magalhães Pessoa to face União de Leiria. The home side startled Benfica, beating them 3–1. The loss, which Koeman called a small setback, granted Sporting the chance to catch Benfica in second place. On 8 February, Benfica met Nacional at home for the sixth round of the Portuguese Cup; the match ended in a goalless draw, even after extra time. Benfica won the match after a penalty shoot-out. Four days later, Benfica returned to the winning path in the Primeira Liga after beating Penafiel 4–0. Geovanni opened the scoring in the first half, after which Nuno Gomes, Simão and an own goal from Roberto set the final result. On 18 February, Benfica played on the road against Vitória de Guimarães. They did not play as expected and conceded two goals—one in each half—losing 2–0. The loss severely hampered their title defence after being overtaken by Sporting and Braga and allowing leaders Porto—their next league opponent—to gain an eight-point advantage. Three days after Guimarães, Benfica hosted Liverpool for the first leg of the Champions League round of 16. According to Adrian Harte, the match was "largely disappointing", but Benfica secured a vital win against Liverpool when Luisão scored with an 84th-minute header. The final match of February was a home to Porto, the second Clássico of the season. The high-tension match was decided with a 40 m (130 ft) free kick from Laurent Robert that Vítor Baía could not stop. The win relaunched Benfica's title race and Porto's lead was reduced to five points. It was the first time in 29 years since 1976–77 Benfica had beaten Porto twice in the league and was also their first home win over Porto since 2000–01.

Benfica began March with a visit to Estádio José Gomes, home of Estrela da Amadora. The local team scored first through Paulo Machado in the first half, but Benfica scored two goals in the second half; the latter in the 91st minute. On 8 March, Benfica played the return trip of the Champions League against Liverpool. The Rafael Benítez-led side needed to recoup a 1–0 disadvantage but Benfica won the match. A long-range shot from Simão in the 36th minute and a volley from Miccoli in the 89th minute put Benfica into the quarter-finals for the first time in 11 years, eliminating the reigning Champions League title holders in the process. Koeman was thrilled with the win, saying, "This is why football is so nice—you can win against a bigger team, and anything is possible if you work for it". Four days later, on the same day they were drawn with Barcelona in the Champions League, Benfica hosted Naval at home. They failed to break Naval's resistance despite several attempts from Simão and dropped two points in a 0–0 draw. The draw threatened the hopes for a title renewal, as Porto and Sporting had distance themselves in the first two spots. On 15 March, Benfica suffered another setback at home. In the quarter-finals of the Taça de Portugal against Vitória de Guimarães, Benfica was surprised by the visitors and lost 1–0; the match's only goal was scored by Dário Monteiro. On 19 March, Benfica visited the Estádio dos Arcos to play Rio Ave. As with Estrela da Amadora, Benfica only secured the win in overtime, when Mantorras beat Mora with a 93rd-minute goal. Simão later told the press Benfica were still in the title race. Almost a week later, on the 25 March, Benfica hosted the fourth-place team Braga. The home team scored in their second attempt through Nuno Gomes and retained their slim lead until the end. Koeman was happy Benfica resolved the game so early, because in three days they met Barcelona. In the final game of March, Benfica faced Barcelona for the Champions League. Both goalkeepers were instrumental in securing a goalless draw; Moretto had the most work. Koeman was satisfied with the stalemate, predicting the second leg would be similar.

=== April–May ===
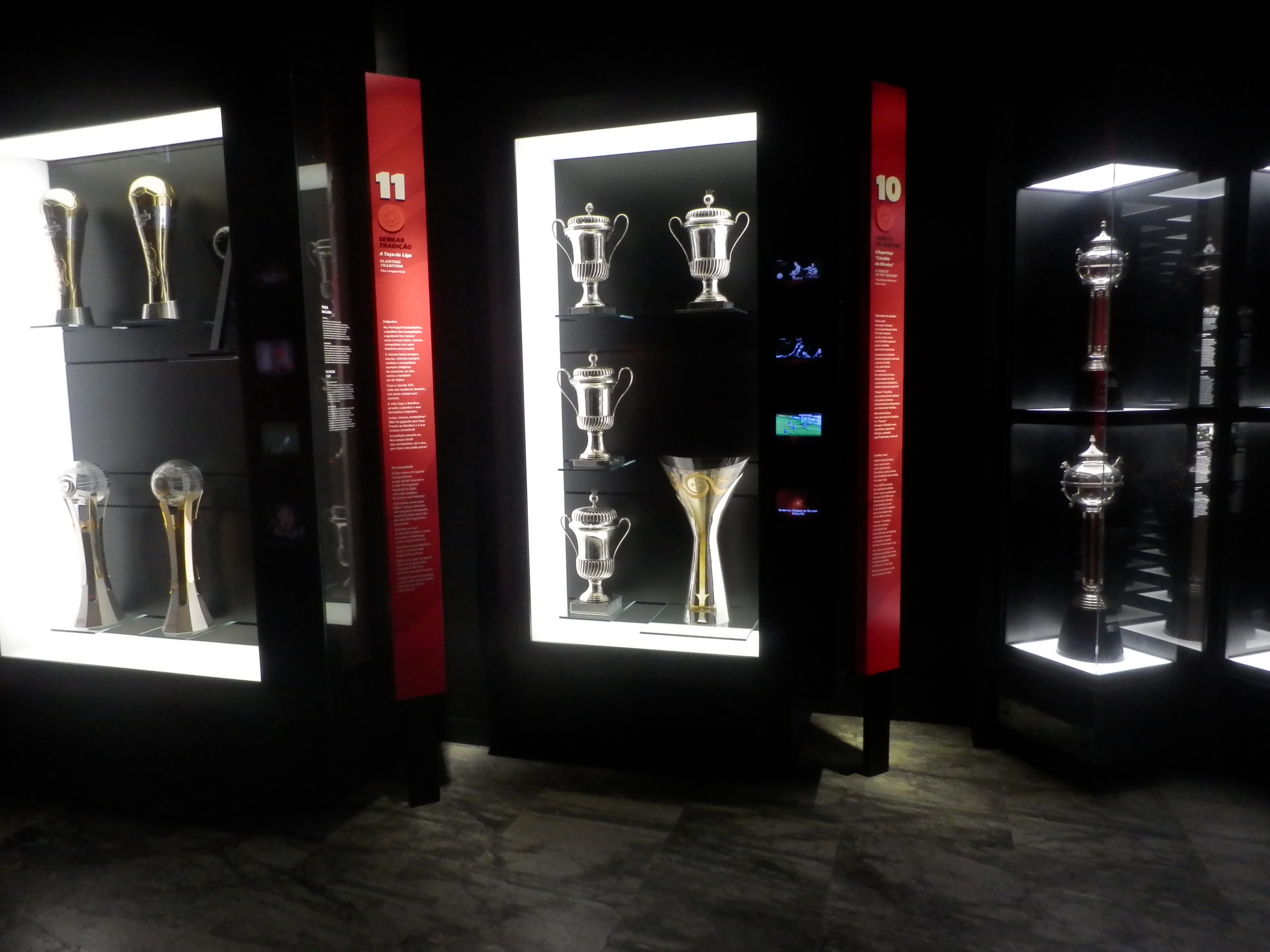
The 2005 Supertaça (centre cabinet, bottom left) was the third honour conquered in 14 months. Benfica would only win another trophy in March 2009.

In April, Benfica were still battling for a Champions League semi-final spot while chasing Porto and Sporting in the domestic title race. On the first day of the month, Benfica played away to Belenenses. José Pedro scored first for the home team in the 9th minute, but Benfica's Miccoli equalized and seven minutes later, Karagounis scored again. Benfica won 2–1. Assistant manager Bruins Slot said, "The win allows us to keep pressure on our opponents and give us morale for Barcelona". The following Wednesday, Benfica visited the Nou Camp in the second leg of the quarter-finals. Barcelona pressured hard and almost scored in the first five minutes with a penalty kick, with Moretto defending Ronaldinho's shot. A few minutes later, the Brazilian scored to make it 1–0 for Barça from open play. Benfica had the best chance to level in the 61st minute, but Simão missed an opportunity. Samuel Eto'o scored a late goal for Barcelona, putting Barça into the semi-finals. President Luís Filipe Vieira said, "We were hoping to reach the final. We were awakened from the dream—every supporter was".

On 9 April, Benfica hosted Marítimo at home. They were caught off guard and briefly trailed by 2–0. Petit and a 96th-minute penalty from Simão equalized for Benfica. Nonetheless, the draw granted Porto the chance to increase their lead to nine points with four games left, making the title renewal "impossible," as Koeman described it. Six days later, on 15 April, Benfica played visitor to Boavista. Hoping to take advantage of Sporting's slip hours earlier and only battling for a direct qualification for the next Champions League campaign, Benfica beat the home side 2–0, with goals from Tiago and Mantorras. The win also broke a ten-year winless streak at the Estádio do Bessa, the last win being on 30 March 1996. On 23 April, Benfica played Nacional on Estádio da Madeira. Benfica led the game most of time, but conceded a late goal from Ricardo Fernandes and lost the chance to overtake Sporting. On 30 April, Benfica hosted and defeated Vitória de Setúbal 1–0 with a first half goal from Anderson. The win meant Koeman had surpass Giovanni Trapattoni's previous points total (67–65), but without the same glory; Porto had already won the league and Sporting was in good position to finish second.

On 7 May, Benfica played their final match of the season at Estádio da Mata Real. Benfica's Manuel Fernandes scored first but could not prevent Paços de Ferreira scoring three second-half goals, thus losing the game. Benfica ended the season in third place, missing out on the title and an automatic place in the 2006–07 UEFA Champions League. Despite winning both games against Porto, the closest Benfica had come from them was on the 18 and 19 match-days, with only three points. Benfica closed the season 12 points behind the leader and five from Sporting. Of the Big Three, Benfica conceded the most goals (29) and scored the second-highest number of goals (51), with the worst goal-average (+22). Koeman wanted to fulfil his contract with Benfica, but after negotiations with the management and sudden interest from PSV, Benfica opted to release him on mutual terms. Koeman thanked Luís Filipe Vieira and José Veiga for their support in face of repeated criticism, and said, "This is very big club, but you cannot win all the time, although I admit, that in the Primeira Liga, he did not do everything he could. We could have done better. But I say, It was a pleasure being here, now my career will continue elsewhere."

== Competitions ==
Win Draw Loss Postponed

=== Overall record ===
Competition	First match	Last match	Record								
Competition	First match	Last match	G	W	D	L	GF	GA	GD	Win %	Source
Primeira Liga	20 August 2005	7 May 2006	34	20	7	7	51	29	+22	58.82	
Taça de Portugal	26 October 2005	15 March 2006	4	2	1	1	4	2	+2	50.00	
Supertaça Cândido de Oliveira	13 August 2005	13 August 2005	1	1	0	0	1	0	+1	100.00	
UEFA Champions League	14 September 2005	5 April 2006	10	4	3	3	8	7	+1	40.00	
Total			49	27	11	11	64	38	+26	55.10	

=== Supertaça Cândido de Oliveira ===
13 August 2005	Benfica	1–0	Vitória de Setúbal	Faro
21:15	Nuno Gomes 51'	Report		Stadium: Estádio do Algarve; Referee: Olegário Benquerença

=== Primeira Liga ===
==== League table ====
Pos	Team	Pld	W	D	L	GF	GA	GD	Pts	Qualification or relegation
1	Porto (C)	34	24	7	3	54	16	+38	79	Qualification to Champions League group stage
2	Sporting CP	34	22	6	6	50	24	+26	72	Qualification to Champions League group stage
3	Benfica	34	20	7	7	51	29	+22	67	Qualification to Champions League third qualifying round
4	Braga	34	17	7	10	38	22	+16	58	Qualification to UEFA Cup first round
5	Nacional	34	14	10	10	40	32	+8	52	Qualification to UEFA Cup first round

Source: Foradejogo
Rules for classification: 1) points; 2) head-to-head points; 3) head-to-head goal difference; 4) goal difference; 5) number of goals scored
(C) Champions

==== Results by round ====
Round	1	2	3	4	5	6	7	8	9	10	11	12	13	14	15	16	17	18	19	20	21	22	23	24	25	26	27	28	29	30	31	32	33	34
Ground	A	H	A	H	A	H	A	H	A	H	A	H	A	H	H	A	H	H	A	H	A	H	A	H	A	H	A	H	A	H	A	A	H	A
Result	D	L	L	W	W	W	W	W	D	D	L	D	W	W	W	W	W	W	W	L	L	W	L	W	W	D	W	W	W	D	W	D	W	L
Position	9	14	16	11	9	5	4	3	4	4	6	6	6	5	5	3	2	2	2	2	3	3	4	4	3	3	3	3	3	3	3	3	3	3

Source: ForaDeJogo.net
A = Away; H = Home; W = Win; D = Draw; L = Loss

==== Matches ====
20 August 2005 1	Académica	0–0	Benfica	Coimbra
21:30		Report	Pereira (yellow card) 70' (yellow-red card) 90'	Stadium: Estádio Cidade de Coimbra; Attendance: 25,084; Referee: Bruno Paixão

27 August 2005 2	Benfica	0–2	Gil Vicente	Lisbon
21:15		Report	Marcos António 66'; Anderson 84' (o.g.)	Stadium: Estádio da Luz; Attendance: 20,000; Referee: Rui Costa

10 September 2005 3	Sporting CP	2–1	Benfica	Lisbon
21:30	Loureiro 38'; Liédson 75'	Report	Rocha (red card) 51'; Simão 65'	Stadium: Estádio José Alvalade; Attendance: 43,162; Referee: Paulo Costa

18 September 2005 4	Benfica	4–0	União de Leiria	Lisbon
19:15	Anderson 4'; Nuno Gomes 42', 62', 86'	Report		Stadium: Estádio da Luz; Attendance: 31,776; Referee: Elmano Santos

23 September 2005 5	Penafiel	1–3	Benfica	Penafiel
20:30	M. Ferreira 80'; Bruno Amaro (yellow card) 78' (yellow-red card) 93'	Report	Nuno Gomes 5', 84'; Simão 12'	Stadium: Estádio Municipal 25 de Abril; Attendance: 5,000; Referee: Olegário Benquerença

3 October 2005 6	Benfica	2–1	Vitória de Guimarães	Lisbon
20:15	Miccoli 20'; Simão 68'	Report	Targino 31'	Stadium: Estádio da Luz; Attendance: 33,344; Referee: Nuno Almeida

15 October 2005 7	Porto	0–2	Benfica	Porto
20:15	Bruno Alves (red card) 81'	Report	Nuno Gomes 56', 64'; Léo (yellow card) 72' (yellow-red card) 86'	Stadium: Estádio do Dragão; Attendance: 50,109; Referee: Lucílio Baptista

22 October 2005 8	Benfica	2–0	Estrela da Amadora	Lisbon
21:00	Karyaka 50'; Nuno Gomes 63'	Report		Stadium: Estádio da Luz; Attendance: 37,645; Referee: João Vilas Boas

29 October 2005 9	Naval	1–1	Benfica	Figueira da Foz
21:15	Bruno 72'	Report	Nuno Gomes 81'	Stadium: Estádio Municipal José Bento Pessoa; Attendance: 6,000; Referee: António Costa

6 November 2005 10	Benfica	2–2	Rio Ave	Lisbon
19:15	Petit 32', 86'	Report	Cleiton 25'; Onyemah 56'	Stadium: Estádio da Luz; Attendance: 35,246; Referee: Paulo Pereira

19 November 2005 11	Braga	3–2	Benfica	Braga
17:00	Césinha 68'; Bevacqua 87', 90+5'	Report	Anderson 20'; Nuno Gomes 90+4' (pen.)	Stadium: Estádio Municipal de Braga; Attendance: 25,000; Referee: João Ferreira

27 November 2005 12	Benfica	0–0	Belenenses	Lisbon
21:15		Report		Stadium: Estádio da Luz; Attendance: 27,323; Referee: Pedro Proença

3 December 2005 13	Marítimo	0–1	Benfica	Funchal
21:15		Report	Mantorras 66'	Stadium: Estádio dos Barreiros; Attendance: 6,000; Referee: Paulo Paraty

11 December 2005 14	Benfica	1–0	Boavista	Lisbon
20:30	Anderson 45'	Report		Stadium: Estádio da Luz; Attendance: 50,741; Referee: Lucílio Baptista

17 December 2005 15	Benfica	1–0	Nacional	Lisbon
19:15	Nuno Gomes 72'; Alcides (yellow card) 35' (yellow-red card) 88'	Report		Stadium: Estádio da Luz; Attendance: 52,089; Referee: Jorge Sousa

21 December 2005 16	Vitória de Setúbal	0–1	Benfica	Setúbal
21:30		Report	Nuno Gomes 90'	Stadium: Estádio do Bonfim; Attendance: 6,500; Referee: Carlos Xistra

8 January 2006 17	Benfica	2–0	Paços de Ferreira	Lisbon
18:30	Nélson 10'; Geovanni 66'	Report		Stadium: Estádio da Luz; Attendance: 53,145; Referee: Elmano Santos

15 January 2006 18	Benfica	3–0	Académica	Lisbon
18:45	Simão 4' (pen.); Luisão 78'; Nuno Gomes 90+3'	Report		Stadium: Estádio da Luz; Attendance: 37,044; Referee: Artur Soares Dias

20 January 2006 19	Gil Vicente	1–3	Benfica	Barcelos
21:30	Nandinho 10' (pen.)	Report	Simão 17' (pen.); Geovanni 34'; Marcos António 56' (o.g.)	Stadium: Estádio Cidade de Barcelos; Attendance: 8,621; Referee: Paulo Baptista

28 January 2006 20	Benfica	1–3	Sporting CP	Lisbon
19:45	Simão 28' (pen.)	Report	Sá Pinto 65' (pen.); Liédson 74', 83'	Stadium: Estádio da Luz; Attendance: 63,489; Referee: Pedro Henriques

4 February 2006 21	União de Leiria	3–1	Benfica	Leiria
21:30	João Paulo 33'; Felício 57'; Maciel 88'	Report	Manduca 81'	Stadium: Estádio Dr. Magalhães Pessoa; Attendance: 16,796; Referee: António Costa

12 February 2006 22	Benfica	4–0	Penafiel	Lisbon
21:30	Geovanni 37'; Roberto 63' (o.g.); Nuno Gomes 77'; Simão 90+3'	Report		Stadium: Estádio da Luz; Attendance: 37,097; Referee: Nuno Almeida

18 February 2006 23	Vitória de Guimarães	2–0	Benfica	Guimarães
18:00	Svärd 22'; Neca 70'	Report		Stadium: Estádio D. Afonso Henriques; Attendance: 18,410; Referee: Lucílio Baptista

26 February 2006 24	Benfica	1–0	Porto	Lisbon
19:45	Robert 40'	Report		Stadium: Estádio da Luz; Attendance: 57,787; Referee: João Ferreira

4 March 2006 25	Estrela da Amadora	1–2	Benfica	Lisbon
21:30	Machado 31'	Report	Robert 51'; Miccoli 90+1'	Stadium: Estádio da Reboleira; Attendance: 3,000; Referee: Paulo Costa

12 March 2006 26	Benfica	0–0	Naval	Lisbon
19:45		Report	Franco (red card) 56'	Stadium: Estádio da Luz; Attendance: 49,193; Referee: Carlos Xistra

19 March 2006 27	Rio Ave	0–1	Benfica	Vila do Conde
18:30		Report	Mantorras 90+3'	Stadium: Estádio do Rio Ave FC; Attendance: 4,000; Referee: Paulo Paraty

25 March 2006 28	Benfica	1–0	Braga	Lisbon
19:00	Nuno Gomes 2'	Report	Luís Filipe (yellow card) 54' (yellow-red card) 71'	Stadium: Estádio da Luz; Attendance: 49,628; Referee: Paulo Baptista

1 April 2006 29	Belenenses	1–2	Benfica	Lisbon
21:15	José Pedro 9'	Report	Miccoli 23'; Karagounis 30'	Stadium: Estádio do Restelo; Attendance: 12,000; Referee: Pedro Henriques

9 April 2006 30	Benfica	2–2	Marítimo	Lisbon
18:30	Petit 79'; Simão 90+6' (pen.)	Report	Valnei 37'; Zé Carlos 72'	Stadium: Estádio da Luz; Attendance: 45,054; Referee: Augusto Duarte

15 April 2006 31	Boavista	0–2	Benfica	Porto
21:15	Rosário (yellow card) 83' (yellow-red card) 83'	Report	Tiago 51' (o.g.); Mantorras 82'	Stadium: Estádio do Bessa; Attendance: 9,500; Referee: Bruno Paixão

23 April 2006 32	Nacional	1–1	Benfica	Funchal
18:30	R. Fernandes 88'	Report	Miccoli 47'	Stadium: Estádio da Madeira; Attendance: 3,000; Referee: Olegário Benquerença

30 April 2006 33	Benfica	1–0	Vitória de Setúbal	Lisbon
18:30	Anderson 25'	Report		Stadium: Estádio da Luz; Attendance: 51,448; Referee: Artur Soares Dias

7 May 2006 34	Paços de Ferreira	3–1	Benfica	Paços de Ferreira
18:30	Édson 48'; Júnior 67', 90+2'	Report	Fernandes 36'	Stadium: Estádio da Mata Real; Attendance: 4,500; Referee: Lucílio Baptista

=== Taça de Portugal ===
26 October 2005 Fourth round	Leixões	1–2	Benfica	Porto
19:45	Nuno Amaro 38'	Report	Simão 11', 85'	Stadium: Estádio do Bessa; Attendance: 17,000; Referee: Carlos Xistra

11 January 2006 Fifth round	Tourizense	0–2	Benfica	Tábua
17:45	Fernando (yellow card) 60' (yellow-red card) 84'; Simões (yellow card) 78' (yellow-red card) 86'	Report	Robert 66'; Nuno Gomes 79'	Stadium: Estádio Municipal de Tábua; Attendance: 8,000; Referee: Carlos Xistra

8 February 2006 Sixth round	Benfica	0–0 (a.e.t.) (5–3 p)	Nacional	Lisbon
20:45		Report		Stadium: Estádio da Luz; Attendance: 18,000; Referee: João Ferreira
	Penalties
	Robert (penalty scored); Luisão (penalty scored); Karagounis (penalty scored); Marcel (penalty scored); Simão (penalty scored)		Bruno (penalty scored); Juliano (penalty scored); Alonso (penalty scored); Patacas (penalty missed)

15 March 2006 Quarter-finals	Benfica	0–1	Vitória Guimarães	Lisbon
20:45		Report	Monteiro 23'	Stadium: Estádio da Luz; Attendance: 22,727; Referee: Jorge Sousa

=== UEFA Champions League ===
==== Group D ====
Pos	Team	Pld	W	D	L	GF	GA	GD	Pts	Qualification
1	(Spain) Villarreal	6	2	4	0	3	1	+2	10	Advance to knockout stage
2	(Portugal) Benfica	6	2	2	2	5	5	0	8	Advance to knockout stage
3	(France) Lille	6	1	3	2	1	2	−1	6	Transfer to UEFA Cup
4	(England) Manchester United	6	1	3	2	3	4	−1	6	

Source: RSSSF

14 September 2005 1	Benfica (Portugal)	1–0	(France) Lille	Estádio da Luz, Lisbon
20:45	Miccoli 90+2'	Report		Attendance: 38,000; Referee: Rene Temmink (Netherlands)

27 September 2005 2	Manchester United (England)	2–1	(Portugal) Benfica	Old Trafford, Manchester
20:45	Giggs 35'; Van Nistelrooy 85'	Report	Simão 59'	Attendance: 66,100; Referee: Ľuboš Micheľ (Slovakia)

18 October 2005 3	Villarreal (Spain)	1–1	(Portugal) Benfica	Estadio El Madrigal, Villarreal
20:45	Riquelme 72' (pen.)	Report	Fernandes 77'	Attendance: 20,000; Referee: Florian Meyer (Germany)

2 November 2005 4	Benfica (Portugal)	0–1	(Spain) Villarreal	Estádio da Luz, Lisbon
20:45		Report	Senna 81'	Attendance: 30,000; Referee: Frank De Bleeckere (Belgium)

22 November 2005 5	Lille (France)	0–0	(Portugal) Benfica	Stade de France, Paris
20:45		Report		Attendance: 76,200; Referee: Massimo Busacca (Switzerland)

7 December 2005 6	Benfica (Portugal)	2–1	(England) Manchester United	Estádio da Luz, Lisbon
20:45	Geovanni 16'; Beto 34'	Report	Scholes 6'	Attendance: 64,000; Referee: Kyros Vassaras (Greece)

==== Round of 16 ====
21 February 2006 First leg	Benfica (Portugal)	1–0	(England) Liverpool	Estádio da Luz, Lisbon
19:45	Luisão 84'	Report		Attendance: 63,000; Referee: Konrad Plautz (Austria)

8 March 2006 Second leg	Liverpool (England)	0–2 (3–0 agg.)	(Portugal) Benfica	Anfield, Liverpool
19:45		Report	Simão 36'; Miccoli 89'	Attendance: 42,750; Referee: Massimo De Santis (Italy)

==== Quarter-finals ====
28 March 2006 First leg	Benfica (Portugal)	0–0	(Spain) Barcelona	Estádio da Luz, Lisbon
19:45		Report		Attendance: 65,000; Referee: Steve Bennett (England)

5 April 2006 Second leg	Barcelona (Spain)	2–0 (2–0 agg.)	(Portugal) Benfica	Camp Nou, Barcelona
19:45	Ronaldinho 19'; Eto'o 89'	Report		Attendance: 89,875; Referee: Ľuboš Micheľ (Slovakia)

=== Friendlies ===
10 July 2005	FC Sion	1–2	Benfica	Sion, Switzerland
17:15 CET (UTC+01)	Thurre 61'		Karadas 49'; Geovanni 70'	Stadium: Stade Tourbillon

13 July 2005	Étoile Carouge	0–3	Benfica	Carouge, Switzerland
17:15 CET (UTC+01)			Mantorras 25'; Nuno Gomes 59' (pen.), 80'	Stadium: Stade de la Fontenette

17 July 2005	Benfica	0–1	Chelsea	Lisbon, Portugal
19:30 CET (UTC+01)			Rocha 43' (o.g.)	Stadium: Estádio da Luz

22 July 2005	Benfica	5–0	West Bromwich	Albufeira, Portugal
19:30 CET (UTC+01)	Geovanni 5', 25', 64'; Roque 58'; Simão 65'			Stadium: Estádio Municipal de Albufeira

27 July 2005	Barreirense	0–1	Benfica	Barreiro, Portugal
19:30 CET (UTC+01)			Petit 78'	Stadium: Estádio Dr. Manuel de Mello

30 July 2005	Vitória Guimarães	1–1	Benfica	Guimarães, Portugal
19:30 CET (UTC+01)	Saganowski 77'		Beto 50'	Stadium: Estádio D. Afonso Henriques; Referee: Paulo Costa

2 August 2005	Estoril Praia	0–1	Benfica	Estoril, Portugal
21:15 CET (UTC+01)			Yohanna 83' (o.g.)	Stadium: Estádio António Coimbra da Mota

6 August 2005	Benfica	0–2	Juventus	Lisbon, Portugal
19:30 CET (UTC+01)			Ibrahimović 5'; Trezeguet 22'	Stadium: Estádio da Luz

== Player statistics ==
The squad for the season consisted of the players listed in the tables below and staff members Ronald Koeman (manager), Bruins Slot (assistant manager) and Fernando Chalana (assistant manager).

Note 1: Note: Flags indicate national team as defined under FIFA eligibility rules. Players may hold more than one non-FIFA nationality.

Note 2: Players with squad numbers marked ‡ joined the club during the 2005-2006 season via transfer, with more details in the following section.

No.	Pos	Nat	Player	Total		Primeira Liga		Taça de Portugal		Champions League		Supertaça	
No.	Pos	Nat	Player	Apps	Goals	Apps	Goals	Apps	Goals	Apps	Goals	Apps	Goals
1	GK	(Portugal) POR	José Moreira	9	-6	6	-4	0	0	2	-2	1	0
3^{‡}	DF	(Brazil) BRA	Anderson	41	4	29	4	2	0	9	0	1	0
4	DF	(Brazil) BRA	Luisão	45	2	31	1	3	0	10	1	1	0
5^{‡}	DF	(Brazil) BRA	Léo	38	0	26	0	3	0	9	0	0	0
6	MF	(Portugal) POR	Petit	42	3	30	3	2	0	9	0	1	0
7	MF	(Portugal) POR	Carlitos	1	0	1	0	0	0	0	0	0	0
8	MF	(Portugal) POR	Bruno Aguiar	0	0	0	0	0	0	0	0	0	0
9	FW	(Angola) ANG	Mantorras	24	3	17	3	2	0	5	0	0	0
10^{‡}	MF	(Greece) GRE	Georgios Karagounis	29	1	19	1	4	0	6	0	0	0
11	MF	(Brazil) BRA	Geovanni	36	4	24	3	3	0	8	1	1	0
12	GK	(Portugal) POR	Quim	12	-6	7	-3	2	-1	3	-2	0	0
13	DF	(Brazil) BRA	Alcides	18	0	12	0	2	0	4	0	0	0
14	MF	(Portugal) POR	Manuel Fernandes	40	2	28	1	3	0	8	1	1	0
15	MF	(Portugal) POR	Nuno Assis	12	0	10	0	0	0	2	0	0	0
16^{‡}	MF	(Brazil) BRA	Beto	37	1	24	0	4	0	8	1	1	0
17^{‡}	MF	(Russia) RUS	Andrey Karyaka	12	1	9	1	1	0	1	0	1	0
18	DF	(France) FRA	Manuel dos Santos	4	0	3	0	0	0	0	0	1	0
19	MF	(Brazil) BRA	Everson	0	0	0	0	0	0	0	0	0	0
19^{‡}	FW	(Brazil) BRA	Marcel	9	0	7	0	1	0	1	0	0	0
20	MF	(Portugal) POR	Simão	36	12	24	8	3	2	8	2	1	0
21	FW	(Portugal) POR	Nuno Gomes	42	17	29	15	4	1	8	0	1	1
22^{‡}	DF	(Portugal) POR	Nélson	33	0	24	0	2	0	7	0	0	0
23^{‡}	FW	(Brazil) BRA	Gustavo Manduca	19	1	16	1	3	0	0	0	0	0
27	DF	(Portugal) POR	João Pereira	11	0	6	0	1	0	3	0	1	0
28	MF	(Portugal) POR	Hélio Roque	4	0	3	0	0	0	0	0	1	0
30^{‡}	FW	(Italy) ITA	Fabrizio Miccoli	23	6	17	4	0	0	6	2	0	0
31^{‡}	GK	(Brazil) BRA	Marcelo Moretto	23	-19	18	-17	1	0	4	-2	0	0
32^{‡}	MF	(Portugal) POR	Marco Ferreira	6	0	5	0	1	0	0	0	0	0
33	DF	(Portugal) POR	Ricardo Rocha	40	0	26	0	4	0	9	0	1	0
34^{‡}	MF	(France) FRA	Laurent Robert	19	3	13	2	3	1	3	0	0	0
39	MF	(Portugal) POR	João Coimbra	1	0	1	0	0	0	0	0	0	0
43	GK	(Portugal) POR	Rui Nereu	7	-6	4	-3	1	-1	2	-2	0	0

== Transfers ==
=== In ===
Entry date	Position	Player	From club	Fee	Ref
3 June 2005	DM	Beto	Beira-Mar	Undisclosed	
21 June 2005	AM	Diego Souza	Fluminense	Undisclosed	
2 July 2005	AM	Karyaka	Krylia Sovetov	Undisclosed	
3 July 2005	CB	Anderson	Corinthians	Undisclosed	
12 July 2005	LB	Léo	Santos	Undisclosed	
24 August 2005	RB	Nélson	Boavista	Undisclosed	
30 August 2005	AM	Karagounis	Internazionale	Undisclosed	
28 December 2005	LW	Gustavo Manduca	Marítimo	Undisclosed	
2 January 2006	GK	Marcelo Moretto	Vitória Setúbal	Undisclosed	
2 January 2006	RW	Marco Ferreira	Penafiel	Undisclosed	
4 January 2006	LW	Laurent Robert	Newcastle United	Undisclosed	

=== In by loan ===
Entry date	Position	Player	From club	Exit date	Ref
1 July 2005	CB	Alcides	Chelsea	30 June 2006	
31 August 2005	FW	Fabrizio Miccoli	Juventus	30 June 2006	
17 January 2006	ST	Marcel	Académica	30 June 2006	

=== Out ===
Entry date	Position	Player	From club	Fee	Ref
1 June 2005	FW	Šokota	Porto	Free	
1 June 2005	ST	Andrija Delibašić	Mallorca	Loan end	
5 August 2005	LB	Takis Fyssas	Hearts	Undisclosed	
17 August 2005	CM	Ednilson	OFI	Free	
18 August 2005	RB	Miguel	Valencia	Undisclosed	
20 August 2005	LB	Alex	Wolfsburg	Undisclosed	
16 January 2006	LB	Manuel dos Santos	Monaco	Free	
10 January 2006	CM	Bruno Aguiar	Hearts	Free	
24 April 2006	DM	Paulo Almeida	Corinthians	Free	

=== Out by loan ===
Entry date	Position	Player	From club	Exit date	Ref
29 June 2005	CB	Eurípedes Amoreirinha	Estrela da Amadora	30 June 2006	
29 June 2005	RW	Manú	Estrela da Amadora	30 June 2006	
11 July 2005	CB	André Luís	Marseille	30 June 2006	
21 July 2005	GK	Yannick Quesnel	Marseille	30 June 2006	
21 July 2005	ST	Azar Karadas	Portsmouth	30 June 2006	
28 July 2005	AM	Diego Souza	Flamengo	30 June 2006	
3 January 2006	LW	Hélio Roque	Vitória Setúbal	30 June 2006	
9 January 2006	RW	Carlitos	Vitória Setúbal	30 June 2006	
16 January 2006	CM	Everson	Young Boys	30 June 2006	

== See also ==
- 2005–06 in Portuguese football
