= 2004–05 Sporting CP season =

Sporting CP
2004–05 season
- Chairman: António Dias da Cunha
- Manager: José Peseiro
- Stadium: Estádio José Alvalade
- Primeira Liga: 3rd
- Taça de Portugal: Sixth round
- UEFA Cup: Runners-up
- Top goalscorer: League: Liédson (25); All: Liédson (35)
- Highest home attendance: 49,032 vs Benfica (8 January 2005)
- Lowest home attendance: 19,000 vs Estoril (28 February 2005)
Home colours	Away colours

The 2004–05 season was Sporting Clube de Portugal's 97th competitive season, 71st consecutive season in the top flight of Portuguese football, and 98th year in existence as a football club.

Sporting CP's season began on 29 August 2004 with the first game of the Primeira Liga campaign, with a 3–2 home victory over Gil Vicente. Despite being top of the league at the half way mark of the season, and claiming home victories over rivals Benfica and Porto, the Leões finished in third place, four points behind league champions Benfica.

Aside from the Primeira Liga, Sporting CP also competed in the Taça de Portugal, where they entered the fourth round courtesy of their league position. After claiming straightforward victories over Naval 1º de Maio and Pampilhosa, Sporting CP were eliminated by Lisbon rivals Benfica in the sixth round. In a highly entertaining 3–3 game, the tie went to penalties which saw the Encarnados defeat the Leões 7–6 on penalties.

Given their third-place finish in the 2003–04 season, the Leões secured a place in the first round of the 2004–05 UEFA Cup. After progressing through the group stages, Sporting CP defeated Dutch side Feyenoord, and English sides Middlesbrough and Newcastle United to set up a semi-final tie against AZ. Despite taking a 2–1 lead into the second leg, the Cheese Farmers equaled the first leg result which led to extra time. After Kew Jaliens's 109th-minute strike which gave AZ the aggregate lead, Miguel Garcia scored a stoppage time goal to see Sporting CP progress to the final on the away goals rule. In the final taking place at the Estádio José Alvalade, Sporting CP met Russian side CSKA Moscow. Despite taking a first half lead, Sporting CP lost their advantage and conceded three second half goals to lose the final 3–1.

== First team squad ==
Stats as of the end of the 2004–05 season. Games played and goals scored only refers to appearances and goals in domestic league campaigns.

No.	Name	Nationality	Position(s)	Since	Date of Birth (Age)	Signed from	Games	Goals
Goalkeepers
1	Nélson	(Portugal)	GK	1997	20 October 1975 (aged 29)	(Portugal) Torreense	56	0
12	Tiago	(Portugal)	GK	1995	16 April 1975 (aged 30)	(Portugal) Estrela da Amadora	78	0
13	Mário Felgueiras	(Portugal)	GK	2005	12 December 1986 (aged 18)	(Portugal) Youth System	0	0
76	Ricardo	(Portugal)	GK	2003	11 February 1976 (aged 29)	(Portugal) Boavista	67	0
Defenders
4	Ânderson Polga	(Brazil)	CB	2003	9 February 1979 (aged 26)	(Brazil) Grêmio	55	0
6	Hugo	(Portugal)	CB	2000	11 August 1976 (aged 28)	(Italy) Sampdoria	59	3
14	Joseph Enakarhire	(Nigeria)	CB	2004	6 November 1982 (aged 22)	(Belgium) Standard Liège	19	0
15	Miguel Garcia	(Portugal)	RB	2003	4 February 1983 (aged 22)	(Portugal) Youth System	40	0
18	Mário Sérgio	(Portugal)	RB	2003	28 July 1981 (aged 23)	(Portugal) Paços de Ferreira	12	0
21	Paíto	(Portugal)	LB	2003	5 July 1982 (aged 22)	(Portugal) Youth System	22	0
22	Beto	(Portugal)	CB	1994	3 May 1976 (aged 29)	(Portugal) Youth System	235	20
23	Rui Jorge	(Portugal)	LB	1998	27 March 1973 (aged 32)	(Portugal) Porto	191	5
Midfielders
5	Carlos Martins	(Portugal)	AM / CM	2000	29 April 1982 (aged 23)	(Portugal) Youth System	43	7
8	Pedro Barbosa (C)	(Portugal)	AM / CM	1995	6 August 1970 (aged 34)	(Portugal) Vitória de Guimarães	259	39
11	Rodrigo Tello	(Chile)	LB / LM	2001	14 October 1979 (aged 25)	Universidad de Chile	65	4
24	Miguel Veloso	(Portugal)	LB / CM	2005	11 May 1986 (aged 19)	(Portugal) Youth System	0	0
26	Fábio Rochemback	(Brazil)	AM / CM / DM	2003	10 December 1981 (aged 23)	(Spain) Barcelona	44	9
27	Custódio	(Portugal)	DM	2002	25 May 1983 (aged 21)	(Portugal) Youth System	52	4
28	João Moutinho	(Portugal)	AM / CM	2005	8 September 1986 (aged 18)	(Portugal) Youth System	15	0
37	Rogério	(Brazil)	RWB / RM	2004	28 February 1976 (aged 29)	(Brazil) Corinthians	29	2
45	Hugo Viana	(Portugal)	CM / LM	2004	15 January 1983 (aged 22)	(England) Newcastle United	59	7
77	Tinga	(Brazil)	DM	2004	13 January 1978 (aged 27)	(Brazil) Grêmio	20	0
Forwards
9	Marius Niculae	(Romania)	CF	2001	16 May 1981 (aged 24)	(Romania) Dinamo București	59	14
10	Ricardo Sá Pinto	(Portugal)	AM / CF / RW	2000	10 October 1972 (aged 32)	(Spain) Real Sociedad	146	32
17	Roudolphe Douala	(Cameroon)	LW / CF / RW	2004	25 September 1978 (aged 26)	(Portugal) Boavista	22	4
20	Danny	(Portugal)	AM / LW	2002	7 August 1983 (aged 21)	(Portugal) Marítimo	10	0
25	Paulo Sérgio	(Portugal)	LW / RW	2003	24 January 1984 (aged 21)	(Portugal) Youth System	0	0
31	Liédson	(Brazil)	CF	2003	17 December 1977 (aged 27)	(Brazil) Corinthians	61	40
36	Carlos Saleiro	(Portugal)	CF	2005	25 February 1986 (aged 19)	(Portugal) Youth System	0	0
87	Mauricio Pinilla	(Chile)	CF	2004	4 February 1984 (aged 21)	(Italy) Inter Milan	16	5
99	João Mota	(Brazil)	CF	2005	21 November 1980 (aged 24)	(South Korea) Jeonnam Dragons	5	0

== Club ==
=== Coaching staff ===
Position	Staff
Manager	(Portugal) José Peseiro
Assistant Manager	(Portugal) Eduardinho
Assistant Manager	(Portugal) Luís Martins
Assistant Manager	(Portugal) Pedro Caixinha
Goalkeeper Coach	(Portugal) Fernando Justino
Training Coach	(Portugal) Flávio Baia dos Santos
Scout	(Portugal) João Ruas
Doctor	(Portugal) Gomes Pereira
Kit man	(Portugal) Paulinho

=== Other information ===
Chairman	(Portugal) António Dias da Cunha
Sporting Director	(Portugal) Carlos Freitas
Ground (capacity and dimensions)	Estádio José Alvalade (50,095 / 105 x 68 metres)
Training Ground	Academia Sporting

== Pre-season and Post-season friendlies ==
=== Legend ===
Win Draw Loss

=== Matches ===
21 July 2004 Friendly	Sporting CP	1 – 2	(England) Bolton Wanderers	Lisbon
20:00 WEST	Martins 43'		Fadiga; Pedersen	Stadium: Academia Sporting

28 July 2004 Friendly	Crystal Palace (England)	1 – 0	Sporting CP	London
19:45 WEST	Popovic 72'			Stadium: Selhurst Park

31 July 2004 Gateshead Cup	Sporting CP	1 – 1 (4–3 p)	(Netherlands) Feyenoord	Newcastle upon Tyne
12:30 WEST	Hugo 40'		Kuyt 56'	Stadium: St James' Park
	Penalties
	(penalty missed); Rogério (penalty scored); Polga (penalty scored); Niculae (penalty scored); Beto (penalty scored)		Penalty missed Penalty scored

1 August 2004 Gateshead Cup	Newcastle United (England)	0 – 1	Sporting CP	Newcastle upon Tyne
15:00 WEST			Tello 33'	Stadium: St James' Park; Attendance: 23,446; Referee: Neale Barry

4 August 2004 Friendly	Blackburn Rovers (England)	0 – 1	Sporting CP	Blackburn
19:30 WEST			Niculae 46'	Stadium: Ewood Park

8 August 2004 Friendly	Penafiel	0 – 1	Sporting CP	Penafiel
21:00 WEST			Garcia 43'	Stadium: Estádio Municipal 25 de Abril

13 August 2004 Teresa Herrera Trophy	Deportivo La Coruña (Spain)	2 – 0	Sporting CP	A Coruña
20:00 WEST	Amo; Acuña			Stadium: Estadio Riazor

15 August 2004 Teresa Herrera Trophy	Sporting CP	0 – 2	(Spain) Real Zaragoza	A Coruña
18:00 WEST			Soriano 19'; Sávio 37'	Stadium: Estadio Riazor

18 August 2004 Friendly	Boavista	1 – 1	Sporting CP	Porto
21:15 WEST	Rosário 63'		Rogério 51' (pen.)	Stadium: Estádio do Bessa

21 August 2004 Friendly	Sporting CP	1 – 0	(Italy) Chievo Verona	Lisbon
21:00 WEST	Liédson 46'			Stadium: Estádio José Alvalade

27 May 2005 Friendly	Sporting CP	2 – 2 (5–4 p)	(Germany) Hertha Berlin	Paris
20:15 WEST	Sá Pinto 55' (pen.); Paíto 69'		Wichniarek 13'; Mansız 41'
	Penalties
	Penalty scored		Penalty missed Penalty scored

== Competitions ==
=== Primeira Liga ===
==== Standings ====
Pos	Team	Pld	W	D	L	GF	GA	GD	Pts	Qualification or relegation
1	Benfica (C)	34	19	8	7	51	31	+20	65	Qualification to Champions League group stage
2	Porto	34	17	11	6	39	26	+13	62	Qualification to Champions League group stage
3	Sporting CP	34	18	7	9	66	36	+30	61	Qualification to Champions League third qualifying round
4	Braga	34	16	10	8	45	28	+17	58	Qualification to UEFA Cup first round
5	Vitória de Guimarães	34	15	9	10	38	29	+9	54	Qualification to UEFA Cup first round

Source: Foradejogo
Rules for classification: 1) points; 2) head-to-head points; 3) head-to-head goal difference; 4) goal difference; 5) number of goals scored
(C) Champions

==== Matches ====
- Sporting-Gil Vicente 3-2
- 1-0 Marcos António 18' (o.g.)
- 2-0 Liédson 26'
- 2-1 Marcos António 74'
- 3-1 Liédson 76'
- 3-2 Fábio 80'
- Vitória Setúbal-Sporting 2-0
- 1-0 Jorginho 51' (pen.)
- 2-0 Albert Meyong 69'
- Sporting-Marítimo 0-1
- 0-1 Gustavo Manduca 12'
- Rio Ave-Sporting 0-0
- Sporting-União Leiria 2-2
- 1-0 Rogério 25'
- 1-1 João Paulo 36'
- 1-2 Fábio Felício 73'
- 2-2 Beto 90+3'
- Estoril-Sporting 1-4
- 0-1 Liédson 6'
- 0-2 Liédson 19'
- 1-2 João Paulo 51'
- 1-3 Hugo Viana 62'
- 1-4 Hugo Viana 84'
- Sporting-Belenenses 2-0
- 1-0 Liédson 85'
- 2-0 Roudolphe Douala 86'
- Penafiel-Sporting 0-3
- 0-1 Liédson 48'
- 0-2 Custódio 72'
- 0-3 Liédson 88'
- Porto-Sporting 3-0
- 1-0 Benni McCarthy 57'
- 2-0 Diego 81'
- 3-0 Carlos Alberto 87'
- Sporting-Boavista 6-1
- 1-0 Roudolphe Douala 15'
- 2-0 Hugo Viana 43'
- 3-0 Hugo Viana 44'
- 4-0 Custódio 49'
- 4-1 Felipe Flores 78'
- 5-1 Liédson 81'
- 6-1 Mauricio Pinilla 90+2'
- Beira-Mar-Sporting 2-2
- 1-0 Sunny Ekeh Kingsley 34'
- 1-1 Roudolphe Douala 39'
- 1-2 Bruno Ribeiro 54' (o.g.)
- 2-2 Heitor 90+2'
