= 2005 Supertaça Cândido de Oliveira =

- Event: Supertaça Cândido de Oliveira (Portuguese Super Cup)
Benfica	Vitória de Setúbal
1	0
- Date: 13 August 2005
- Venue: Estádio Algarve, Faro
- Man of the Match: Nuno Gomes (Benfica)
- Referee: Olegário Benquerença (Leiria)
- Attendance: 26,009

The 2005 Supertaça Cândido de Oliveira was the twenty seventh edition of the Supertaça Cândido de Oliveira, the annual Portuguese football season-opening match contested by the winners of the previous season's top league and cup competitions (or cup runner-up in case the league- and cup-winning club is the same). The match was contested between the 2004–05 Primeira Liga winners, Benfica and the 2004–05 Taça de Portugal winners, Vitória de Setúbal.

The match took place at Estádio Cidade de Coimbra in Coimbra on the 13 August 2005. Benfica were making their fourteenth Supertaça appearance. Benfica had previously won three and lost on ten occasions. Vitória de Setúbal were making their first Supertaça appearance. In Portugal, the final was televised live on RTP1. Benfica defeated Vitória 1–0 with a goal in the 51st minute from Nuno Gomes, and collected their fourth Supertaça.

== Background ==
Benfica were appearing in their 14th Supertaça Cândido de Oliveira. Benfica went into the match as three-time winners of the Supertaça (1980, 1985, 1989). Of their thirteen SuperCup appearances, Benfica had lost on ten occasions (1981, 1983, 1984, 1986, 1987, 1991, 1993, 1994, 1996, 2004). Their most recent appearance in the competition saw them lose to Porto in the previous edition of the Supertaça. Setúbal were appearing in their very first Supertaça Cândido de Oliveira.

In Benfica's and Vitória de Setúbal's entire history, both sides had met on 148 occasions. Of their 148 encounters, Benfica had won 98 games, Setúbal had won on 28 occasions and there had been 22 draws. This was the first time that Benfica and Vitória de Setúbal had met in the Supertaça. The last meeting between these two sides was in the 2005 Taça de Portugal Final, where Setúbal defeated Benfica 2–1 at the Estádio Nacional. Albert Meyong scored the winning goal to clinch Vitória's first trophy since 1967. The last meeting between these two sides in domestic league action saw the Lisbon side defeat the Sadinos, 2–0.

== Pre-match ==
=== Entry ===
Benfica qualified for the 2005 Supertaça Cândido de Oliveira by winning the 2004–05 Primeira Liga.

Vitória de Setúbal would gain entry into the competition by winning the 2004–05 Taça de Portugal. En route to the final, Setúbal defeated Pedras Rubras 2–0, Académico de Viseu 3–1, Vitória de Guimarães 3–1 and Braga 3–2.

=== Officials ===
The match officials for the game were confirmed on the 9 August 2005 by the Portuguese Football Federation. Olegário Benquerença of Leiria was named as referee. This was Benquerença's first Supertaça match that he had officiated. He had primarily been used as a referee since the 1997–98 season where he regularly officiated Primeira Liga games. This was Benquerença's second major final that he had officiated after he had previously officiated the 2002 Taça de Portugal Final between Leixões and Sporting CP. For the Supertaça, Benquerença was assisted by Valter Oliveira of Leiria and Luís Marcelino of Leiria, while the fourth official was Nuno Almeida of Algarve.

=== Ticketing ===
Tickets for the Supertaça went on sale on the 13 July. The price of tickets varied between €20 and €30. The Portuguese Football Federation allocated tickets for the teams involved in the Supertaça. Benfica would be allocated an extra 5,000 tickets days before the match due to Vitória de Setúbal not selling all of their remaining tickets.

=== Venue ===
In May 2005, the Algarve Football Association submitted an application to the Portuguese Football Federation to hold the Supertaça in the Estádio Algarve in Faro. The application to the Football Federation would be successful. The Estádio Algarve would receive its first major Portuguese football tournament for the first time in its history when it played host to the 2005 Supertaça.

The stadium which opened in 2004 is the home stadium of both Farense and Louletano. The stadium holds a seating capacity of 30,002. The Estádio Algarve was one of the host venues for UEFA Euro 2004. It played host to three tournament matches of which two were group stage games and the other match was a quarter-final game between the Netherlands and Sweden.

== Match ==
=== Team selection ===
Benfica went into the 2005 Supertaça Cândido de Oliveira with several missing due to injury. Benfica were without newly acquired left back Léo who tore a muscle tendon during pre-season training. Bruno Aguiar was also out of the match as well as central defender Alcides, who was missing due to spraining his knee. Benfica's João Pereira was an injury doubt going into the game but fully recuperated in time to be included in Ronald Koeman's squad.

Koeman selected a squad of 19 players. Included in his squad was João Pereira, who was an injury doubt going into the game. Benfica's squad saw the inclusion of four new signings: Anderson, Andrei Karyaka, Beto and Nuno Assis. Anderson and Beto would start the game while Karyaka was later used in the game as a substitute. The main talking point to Benfica's starting 11 was who would replace Léo in the full back position. Central defender Ricardo Rocha was selected as his replacement. Benfica set up in a 4–5–1 formation with Nuno Gomes playing the lone front man role.

Vitória de Setúbal went into the SuperCup with only one player missing due to injury. Center forward Pedro Oliveira missed the game due to sustaining an injury to his Tibiotarsal joint. Setúbal manager Luís Norton de Matos selected a squad of 22 players for the game. Norton de Matos's squad saw the inclusion of twelve new signings: Adalto, Antonio Franja, Fabien Farnolle, Fábio Hempel, Flávio, Grégory Lacombe, Heitor, Janício, José Fonte, Modou Sougou, Oumar Tchomogo and Siramana Dembélé. Of these 12, Lacombe, Heitor, Janício, Sougou and Dembélé would start the game. Newly acquired signings Franja, Hempel and Tchomogo were used in the game as substitutes. Setúbal lined up in a 4–5–1 formation.

=== Summary ===
Setúbal started strong with early possession of the ball. The game began with a chance created in the first minute of the game through Setúbal's Grégory Lacombe, who shot wide from the centre of the pitch. Benfica's first chance of the game saw clever play by Manuel Fernandes find Geovanni on the right wing who crossed the ball into the box where Ricardo Chaves made a decisive clearance in the six yard box to clear the danger from onrushing Nuno Gomes. On 28 minutes, Benfica's João Pereira would find an unmarked Nuno Gomes in the box where his header was stopped by Marcelo Moretto, who palmed the ball away from goal for a corner. The remainder of the first half would remain uneventful and both teams went in at half time with a goalless score.

The second half began with Benfica dominating possession and trying to create goal-scoring opportunities. Their pressure on Setúbal's defense would pay off in the 51st minute, as Benfica would take the lead through Nuno Gomes. Geovanni would pick up the ball and on the counterattack would go past Ricardo Chaves where he would then find Beto, who would cross for an unmarked Nuno Gomes to make it 1–0. Benfica's goal saw Setúbal manager Luís Norton de Matos make a double substitution where he would bring on two forward players to provide more attacking threat to Setúbal's frontline. Setúbal's double substitution would off as they started to create more goalscoring chances. The best chance of the game for Vitória fell to an unmarked Modou Sougou, who on 73 minutes headed wide of the goal after a cross from Dembelé. Despite Benfica's lead, Vitória would pile on the pressure and test Benfica's defense. The last major chance of the game fell to Fábio Hempel, who headed wide from a Janício cross. Benfica would hold out for the win and clinch the Supertaça.

=== Details ===
13 August 2005
21:15 UTC

Benfica	1–0	Vitória de Setúbal
Nuno Gomes 51'

Estádio Algarve, Faro
Attendance: 26,009
Referee: Olegário Benquerença (Leiria)

Benfica	Vitória de Setúbal

GK	1	(Portugal) José Moreira
RB	27	(Portugal) João Pereira
CB	3	(Brazil) Anderson
CB	4	(Brazil) Luisão
LB	33	(Portugal) Ricardo Rocha	(substituted off) 78'
DM	6	(Portugal) Petit
CM	14	(Portugal) Manuel Fernandes	(substituted off) 80'
CM	16	(Brazil) Beto
LM	11	(Brazil) Geovanni	(substituted off) 69'
RM	20	(Portugal) Simão (c)
CF	21	(Portugal) Nuno Gomes
Substitutes:
GK	12	(Portugal) Quim
DF	2	(Portugal) Alex
DF	18	(France) Manuel dos Santos	(substituted in) 78'
MF	15	(Portugal) Nuno Assis
MF	17	(Russia) Andrei Karyaka	(substituted in) 80'
MF	28	(Portugal) Hélio Roque	(substituted in) 69'
FW	9	(Angola) Mantorras
Manager:
(Netherlands) Ronald Koeman

GK	1	(Brazil) Marcelo Moretto
RB	14	(Cape Verde) Janício
CB	19	(Portugal) Nandinho
CB	15	(Brazil) Auri
LB	23	(Portugal) Veríssimo
DM	2	(France) Siramana Dembélé	(yellow card) 35'
CM	11	(Portugal) Bruno Ribeiro (c)		(substituted off) 75'
CM	3	(Portugal) Ricardo Chaves
LM	21	(France) Grégory Lacombe		(substituted off) 60'
SS	21	(Senegal) Modou Sougou
CF	9	(Portugal) Heitor		(substituted off) 60'
Substitutes:
GK	12	(Portugal) Marco Tábuas
DF	5	(Portugal) José Fonte
DF	13	(Brazil) Adalto
MF	46	(Croatia) Antonio Franja		(substituted in) 75'
MF	50	(Brazil) Binho
FW	17	(Benin) Oumar Tchomogo		(substituted in) 60'
FW	18	(Brazil) Fábio Hempel		(substituted in) 60'
Manager:
(Portugal) Luís Norton de Matos

2005 Supertaça Cândido de Oliveira Winners
Benfica
4th Title

Man of the match

- (Portugal) Nuno Gomes (Benfica)

Match officials

- Assistant referees:
  - Valter Oliveira (Leiria)
  - Luís Marcelino (Leiria)
- Fourth official: Nuno Almeida (Algarve)

Match rules

- 90 minutes
- Penalty shoot-out if scores level after 90 minutes
- Seven named substitutes
- Maximum of three substitutions

== See also ==
- 2005–06 Primeira Liga
- 2005–06 Taça de Portugal
- 2005–06 S.L. Benfica season
