= Antonio Franja =

Croatian footballer (born 1978)

Personal information
- Date of birth: 8 June 1978 (age 48)
- Place of birth: Zagreb, Croatia
- Height: 1.79 m (5 ft 10 in)
- Position: Winger

Senior career*
Years	Team	Apps	(Gls)
1997–1998	Samobor	4	(0)
1998–1999	Croatia Sesvete	20	(3)
1999–2000	Hrvatski Dragovoljac	20	(3)
2000–2002	NK Zagreb	52	(16)
2002–2003	Bursaspor	19	(3)
2003–2004	NK Zagreb	23	(2)
2004–2005	Inter Zaprešić	20	(2)
2005–2006	Vitória Setúbal	14	(1)
2006–2007	Šibenik	12	(3)
2007–2008	Jeonbuk Hyundai	13	(3)
- * Club domestic league appearances and goals

Antonio Franja (born 8 June 1978) is a Croatian former professional footballer who played as a winger.

== Career ==
Franja been through football school NK Dinamo Zagreb. As a junior he signed with NK Croatia Zagreb (Dinamo ). He later went on a loan to NK Croatia Sesvete and as a 20 year old player he won the best second division player trophy. He then moved to NK Hrv. Dragovoljac for only one season. Then he signed with NK Zagreb and in 2001–02 season they won the championship. In the 2002–03 season he was signed to Turkish club Bursaspor. Franja moved to Portugal in the summer of 2005 to Vitória de Setúbal, where he remained for one season before returning to Croatia to play for HNK Šibenik.

Franja's only first team goal came on 6 January 2006, in a Primeira Liga game against C.D. Nacional.

Franja was part of the Vitória de Setúbal side who played in the 2005 Supertaça Cândido de Oliveira, and reached the final of the 2005–06 Taça de Portugal.

For the 2007–08 season he signed with Jeonbuk Hyundai Motors in South Korea and after one year he returned to Croatia where he stopped playing professional football and started playing Futsal first division for MNK Uspinjaca. He finished his career in MNK Futsal Dinamo where he continued to work in the club.
