= Danny (footballer) =

Portuguese footballer (born 1983)

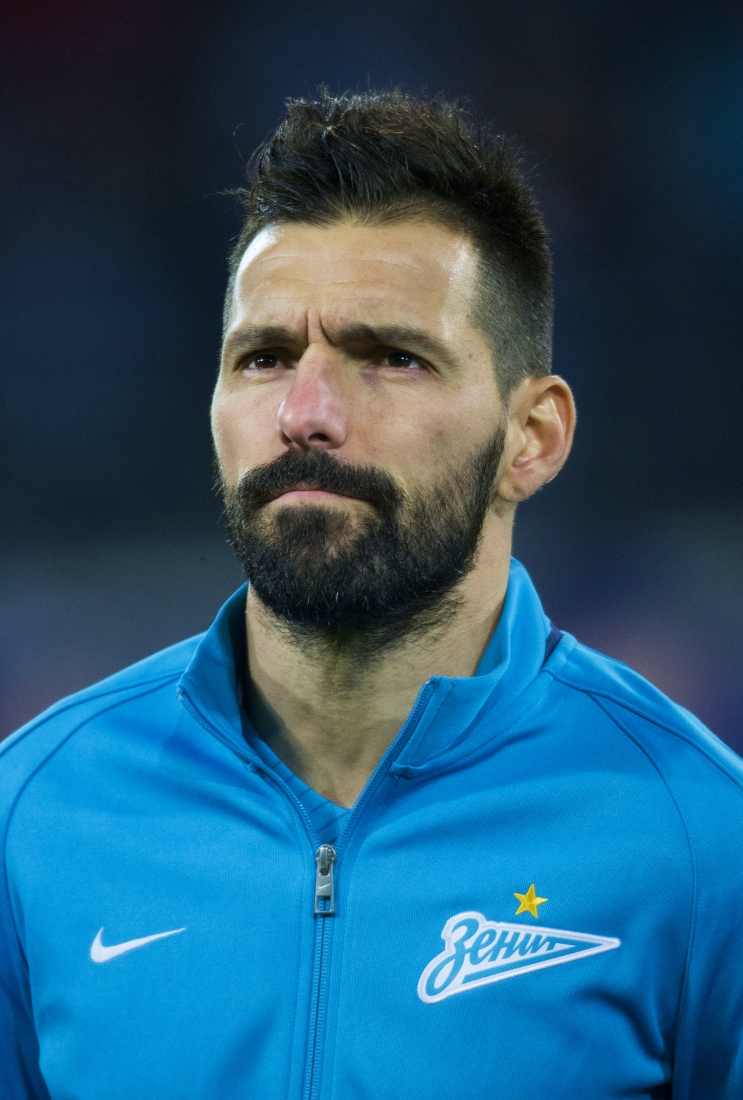
- Danny at Zenit in 2015

Personal information
- Full name: Daniel Miguel Alves Gomes
- Date of birth: 7 August 1983 (age 43)
- Place of birth: Caracas, Venezuela
- Height: 1.78 m (5 ft 10 in)
- Position: Attacking midfielder

Youth career
- 1999–2001: Marítimo

Senior career*
Years	Team	Apps	(Gls)
2001–2002	Marítimo B	15	(1)
2001–2002	Marítimo	20	(5)
2002–2005	Sporting CP	10	(0)
2002	Sporting CP B	7	(0)
2003–2004	→ Marítimo (loan)	29	(1)
2003	→ Marítimo B (loan)	5	(1)
2005–2008	Dynamo Moscow	97	(16)
2008–2017	Zenit St. Petersburg	172	(52)
2017–2018	Slavia Prague	21	(1)
2018	Marítimo	13	(0)
Total		389	(77)

International career
2003–2005	Portugal U21	17	(0)
2008–2016	Portugal	38	(4)
Medal record
Men's football
Representing Portugal
UEFA European Under-21 Championship
Third place	2004 Germany
- * Club domestic league appearances and goals

Daniel Miguel Alves Gomes (born 7 August 1983), commonly known as Danny, is a Portuguese former professional footballer who played as an attacking midfielder. Also a winger, he was known for his dribbling and key passes.

He spent most of his career in Russia in service of Dynamo Moscow and Zenit, after arriving at the age of 21 from Sporting CP. He won seven items of silverware with Zenit, including the 2008 UEFA Super Cup and three Russian Premier League titles.

Danny represented Portugal at the 2010 World Cup and the 2004 Olympics.

== Club career ==
=== Marítimo and Sporting CP ===
Born to Portuguese parents in Caracas, Venezuela, Danny moved to the island of Madeira when he was 15. There, he developed his football skills in the youth teams of Marítimo, making his professional debut in a 2–1 Primeira Liga home win against Gil Vicente on 1 October 2001. A few months later, he scored his first goal in a 2–1 away loss to Salgueiros, also being sent off in the 60th minute; he finished his first season with five goals in 20 games.

Having signed with Sporting CP for €2.1 million in summer 2002, Danny was immediately loaned back to Marítimo, returning in June 2004 and going on to appear in 12 official matches for the Lions.

=== Dynamo Moscow ===
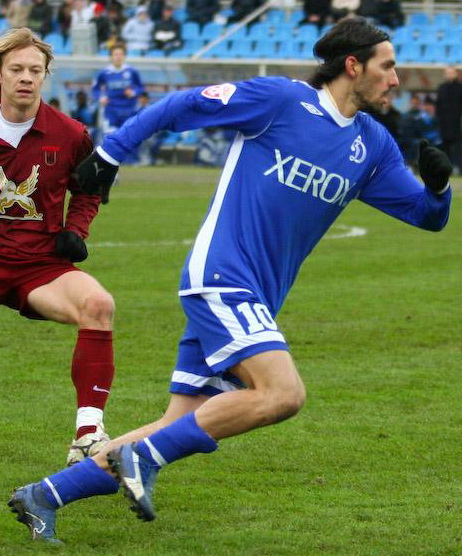
Danny playing for Dynamo Moscow in 2007

In February 2005, Danny joined Russia's Dynamo Moscow in a deal worth €2 million. The club was also involved in other transfer deals of Portuguese and Portugal-based players at the time, including Derlei and Maniche.

Danny would eventually be the one with the most success in the country, being awarded the "Player of the Year" award and leading the team to a third-place finish in 2008.

=== Zenit ===
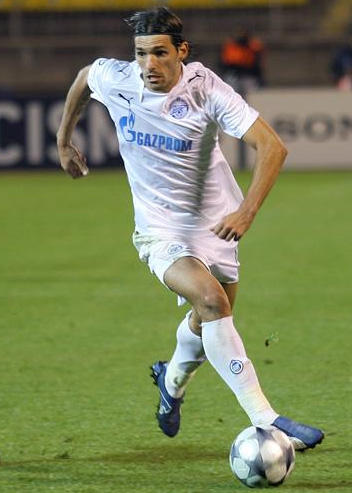
Danny in Champions League action against Real Madrid.

On 24 August 2008, Danny was bought by Zenit Saint Petersburg for a fee of €30 million, which made him the most expensive player of the Russian Premier League; upon his arrival, manager Dick Advocaat hailed him as "the best midfielder in Russia", and he made his debut in the UEFA Super Cup game against Manchester United where he scored the winning goal, later being named Player of the match of the 2–1 victory. The player contributed five league goals to a final fifth place, his total of ten being the competition's joint second-best.

On 14 June 2011, Danny agreed to an extension, prolonging his stay in Saint Petersburg by a further four years. He played all six games in the 2011–12 edition of the UEFA Champions League, scoring in a 3–1 home defeat of Porto as they eventually finished second in their group, level on points with winners APOEL – the fixture also happened to be the player's 100th appearance in a Zenit jersey; on 6 February 2012, however, he suffered an anterior cruciate ligament injury to his right knee, being sidelined for eight months.

Danny returned to training in August 2012, and made in his first appearance since the injury in September. Shortly after Igor Denisov was sent to the youth team for improper conduct, he was appointed captain.

Down 2–0 at home to Málaga on 21 November 2012 in the Champions League group stage, Danny exchanged passes with Tomáš Hubočan before scoring Zenit's first goal. With three minutes left, he missed from less than a metre from goal before the ball was rebounded to Victor Fayzulin, who managed to find the net for the final 2–2 draw. On 4 December, against AC Milan, he netted the only goal as his side won at the San Siro; the result was in vain, however, as the Russians finished third and were relegated to the UEFA Europa League.

In a home match against Anzhi Makhachkala on 10 December 2012, Danny picked up a red card for dissent in a 1–1 draw, which left Zenit in third place. The following 3 August, he scored a hat-trick to help his team to defeat Volga Nizhny Novgorod 3–1 in a league match.

On 26 November 2014, Danny kept his side in contention for a Champions League knockout place by scoring the only goal in a home victory over Benfica. On the domestic front, he totalled 28 games and three goals and the club won its second national championship in four years.

After initially announcing that he would be parting ways with Zenit on 28 May 2015, Danny agreed to a new two-year contract on 5 June, following which he left as a free agent.

=== Slavia Prague ===
Danny signed with Czech club Slavia Prague on 27 June 2017. At the end of the season, he left by mutual consent.

=== Marítimo return ===
On 22 July 2018, Marítimo announced the return of Danny to the Estádio do Marítimo after 14 years. He was released from his contract by mutual agreement on 27 December.

== International career ==
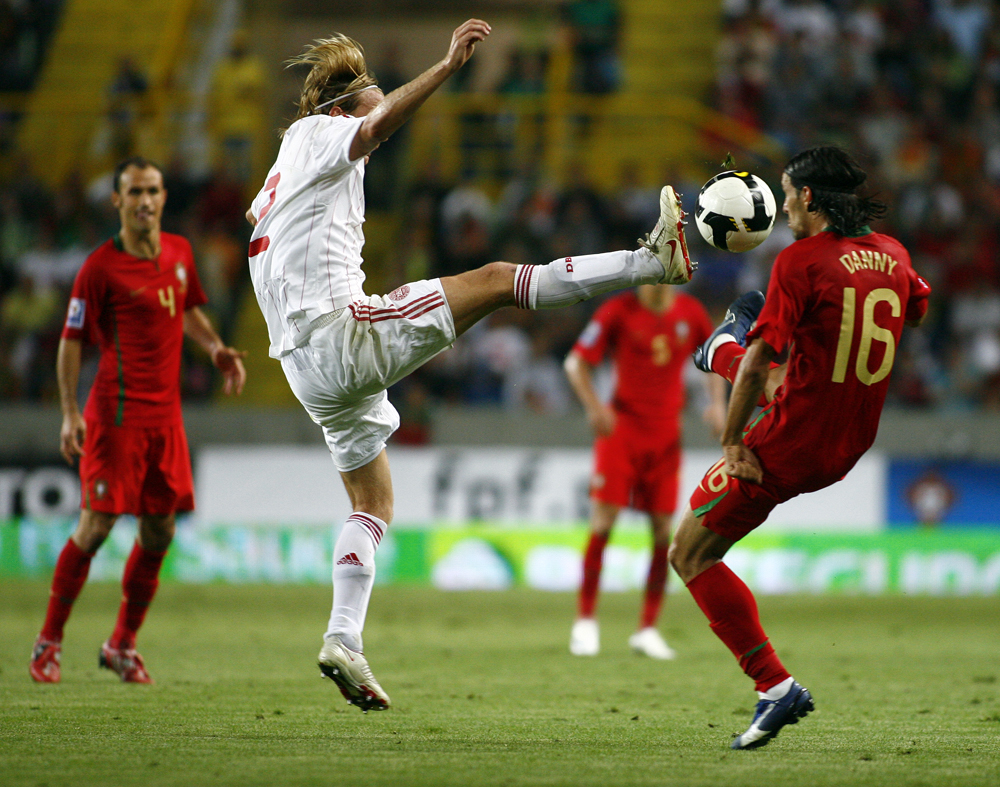
Danny and Christian Poulsen challenge for the ball during Portugal's 3–2 defeat to Denmark on 10 September 2008.

Danny made his debut for Portugal in a friendly against the Faroe Islands, a 5–0 home victory on 20 August 2008. He scored his first goal for the national side on 19 November, opening the score against Brazil; however, it turned out to be a sour one, as the hosts came from behind to win 6–2.

After having played with Portugal at the 2004 Summer Olympics in Athens, a group-stage exit in Athens, while also appearing regularly for the under-21s, Danny was picked for the squad that appeared at the 2010 FIFA World Cup in South Africa. He played three games in the tournament in an eventual round-of-16 exit, including the full 90 minutes in the 0–0 group stage draw with Brazil.

Danny was regularly used by managers Carlos Queiroz and Paulo Bento during the UEFA Euro 2012 qualifying campaign. On 3 September 2010, he netted in a 4–4 draw against minnows Cyprus at the Estádio D. Afonso Henriques in Guimarães after the national team led 4–2. He missed the finals in Poland and Ukraine however, due to a serious injury; also due to physical ailments, he was ruled out of the 2016 edition.

In total, Danny won 38 full caps.

== Personal life ==
Married to Petra Gomes, Danny fathered twin sons Bernardo and Francisco, both of which played youth football with Zenit, and daughter Emily. The first two joined Marítimo's academy after he returned to the club in 2018, going on to represent it at the professional level.

== Career statistics ==
=== Club ===
Appearances and goals by club, season and competition
Club	Season	League			National cup (Note: Includes Taça de Portugal, Russian Cup, Czech Cup)		Europe		Other		Total	
Club	Season	Division	Apps	Goals	Apps	Goals	Apps	Goals	Apps	Goals	Apps	Goals
Marítimo	2001–02	Primeira Liga	20	5	0	0	–		–		20	5
Sporting CP	2002–03	Primeira Liga	1	0	0	0	0	0	–		1	0
Sporting CP	2004–05	Primeira Liga	9	0	0	0	3 (Note: Appearances in UEFA Cup)	0	–		12	0
Sporting CP	Total		10	0	0	0	3	0	0	0	13	0
Marítimo (loan)	2003–04	Primeira Liga	29	1	0	0	–		–		29	1
Dynamo Moscow	2005	Russian Premier League	27	4	4	2	–		–		31	6
Dynamo Moscow	2006	Russian Premier League	24	2	5	1	–		–		29	3
Dynamo Moscow	2007	Russian Premier League	28	5	6	1	–		–		34	6
Dynamo Moscow	2008	Russian Premier League	18	5	1	0	–		–		19	5
Dynamo Moscow	Total		97	16	16	4	–		–		113	20
Zenit	2008	Russian Premier League	10	5	0	0	10 (Note: Six appearances and two goals in UEFA Champions League, four appearances in UEFA Cup)	2	1 (Note: Appearance in UEFA Super Cup)	1	21	8
Zenit	2009	Russian Premier League	8	0	3	0	0	0	–		11	0
Zenit	2010	Russian Premier League	27	10	3	1	12 (Note: Four appearances and one goal in UEFA Champions League, eight appearances and one goal in UEFA Europa League)	2	–		42	13
Zenit	2011–12	Russian Premier League	27	9	1	1	6 (Note: Appearances in UEFA Champions League)	1	1 (Note: Appearance in Russian Super Cup)	0	35	11
Zenit	2012–13	Russian Premier League	12	2	2	0	7 (Note: Three appearances and two goals in UEFA Champions League, four appearances in UEFA Europa League)	2	–		21	4
Zenit	2013–14	Russian Premier League	25	13	0	0	9	3	1	0	35	16
Zenit	2014–15	Russian Premier League	28	3	0	0	15 (Note: Ten appearances and two goals in UEFA Champions League, five appearances in UEFA Europa League)	2	–		43	5
Zenit	2015–16	Russian Premier League	23	6	2	0	8	1	0	0	33	7
Zenit	2016–17	Russian Premier League	12	4	0	0	2 (Note: Appearances in UEFA Europa League)	0	0	0	14	4
Zenit	Total		172	52	11	2	69	13	3	1	255	68
Slavia Prague	2017–18	Czech First League	21	1	4	0	7 (Note: Three appearances in UEFA Champions League, four appearances and one goal in UEFA Europa League)	1	–		32	2
Marítimo	2018–19	Primeira Liga	13	0	2	0	–		–		15	0
Career total			362	75	33	6	79	14	3	1	477	96

=== International ===
Appearances and goals by national team and year
National team	Year	Apps	Goals
Portugal	2008	5	1
Portugal	2009	3	0
Portugal	2010	10	2
Portugal	2011	5	1
Portugal	2012	0	0
Portugal	2013	3	0
Portugal	2014	4	0
Portugal	2015	6	0
Portugal	2016	2	0
Total		38	4

Scores and results list Portugal's goal tally first, score column indicates score after each Danny goal.

List of international goals scored by Danny
No.	Date	Venue	Opponent	Score	Result	Competition
1	20 November 2008	Bezerrão, Gama, Brazil	Brazil	1–0	2–6	Friendly
2	8 June 2010	Wanderers Stadium, Johannesburg, South Africa	Mozambique	1–0	3–0	Friendly
3	3 September 2010	Estádio D. Afonso Henriques, Guimarães, Portugal	Cyprus	3–2	4–4	Euro 2012 qualifying
4	2 September 2011	GSP Stadium, Nicosia, Cyprus	Cyprus	4–0	4–0	Euro 2012 qualifying

== Honours ==
Sporting CP

- Supertaça Cândido de Oliveira: 2002

Zenit

- Russian Football Premier League: 2010, 2011–12, 2014–15
- Russian Cup: 2009–10, 2015–16
- Russian Super Cup: 2011
- UEFA Super Cup: 2008

Slavia Prague

- Czech Cup: 2017–18

Individual

- Footballer of the Year in Russia (Sport-Express): 2010
- Footballer of the Year in Russia (Futbol): 2010
