= Acaiaca =

City in the Brazilian state of Minas Gerais

Coordinates: 20°21′S 43°09′W

- Municipality
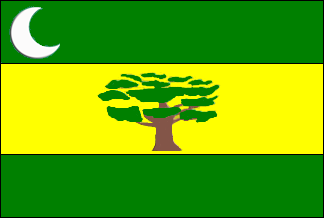
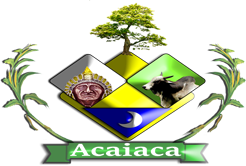
- Flag Coat of arms
- Interactive map of Acaiaca
- Country: Brazil
- State: Minas Gerais
- Region: Southeast
- Time zone: UTC−3 (BRT)

Location of Acaiaca

Acaiaca is a city in the Brazilian state of Minas Gerais. In 2020 its population was estimated to be 3,994. It is the birthplace of Geovanni, the attacking midfield football player formerly of Barcelona, Benfica and Hull City.

== See also ==
- List of municipalities in Minas Gerais
