= Hélio Roque =

Portuguese footballer

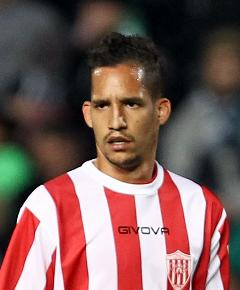
- Roque playing for Nea Salamina in 2013

Personal information
- Full name: Hélio José Lopes Roque
- Date of birth: 20 July 1985 (age 41)
- Place of birth: Huambo, Angola
- Height: 1.74 m (5 ft 9 in)
- Position: Midfielder

Youth career
- 1996–2001: Arrentela
- 2001–2002: Amora
- 2002–2004: Benfica

Senior career*
Years	Team	Apps	(Gls)
2004–2006	Benfica B	10	(4)
2005–2007	Benfica	3	(0)
2006	→ Vitória Setúbal (loan)	11	(0)
2006–2007	→ Olivais Moscavide (loan)	27	(4)
2007–2012	AEL Limassol	93	(15)
2011–2012	→ Nea Salamina (loan)	28	(4)
2012–2014	Nea Salamina	57	(12)
2015–2016	Benfica Luanda	21	(5)
2017	Libolo	6	(0)
2017	Nea Salamina	8	(0)
2018–2020	Olímpico Montijo	50	(8)
2020–2021	Oriental	9	(0)
Total		323	(52)

International career
2004–2005	Portugal U20	5	(1)
- * Club domestic league appearances and goals

Hélio José Lopes Roque (born 20 July 1985) is a Portuguese former professional footballer who played as a midfielder.

== Club career ==
Born in Huambo, Angola to Portuguese settlers, Roque returned to his parents' country and started his football career at Atlético Clube Arrentela and Amora FC, moving at age 17 to S.L. Benfica. He appeared with the main squad in the 2005 Supertaça Cândido de Oliveira, a 1–0 win against Vitória de Setúbal on 13 August in which he came on as a 68th-minute substitute for Geovanni; also from the bench, he took the field in three Primeira Liga matches.

Roque went on loan twice in the following months: in January 2006 he signed for top-flight Vitória Setúbal, and spent the entire 2006–07 season with Lisbon neighbours C.D. Olivais e Moscavide of the Segunda Liga, being released on 30 June 2007.

Subsequently, Roque joined Cypriot club AEL Limassol. After a rather poor debut campaign, his form improved and he began appearing regularly in the starting XI; in spite of being naturally right-footed, he featured mainly on the left wing.

In 2009–10, an injury meant Roque only resumed training in late January 2010. In the 2011 off-season, due to the fact AEL had too many foreign players, he was loaned to fellow First Division side Nea Salamis Famagusta FC, and the move was made permanent for the 2012–13 season.

From 2015, Roque played in the Girabola of his birth country, with S.L. Benfica (Luanda) and C.R.D. Libolo. Afterwards, he had a brief second stint at Nea Salamina.

In August 2018, Roque returned to Portugal after 11 years away, signing for third-tier team Clube Olímpico do Montijo. He then joined Clube Oriental de Lisboa in the same league.

== Honours ==
Benfica

- Supertaça Cândido de Oliveira: 2005
