= Miguel Mora (footballer) =

Spanish footballer

Personal information
- Full name: Miguel Mora Morales
- Date of birth: 3 June 1974 (age 52)
- Place of birth: Barcelona, Spain
- Height: 1.87 m (6 ft 2 in)
- Position: Goalkeeper

Youth career
- 1991–1992: Barcelona

Senior career*
Years	Team	Apps	(Gls)
1992–1993	Lleida	0	(0)
1993–1996	Balaguer		
1996	Gavà	1	(0)
1996–1998	Binéfar		
1998–2000	Lleida	33	(0)
2000	→ Badajoz (loan)	4	(0)
2001–2003	União Madeira	64	(0)
2003–2010	Rio Ave	132	(0)
- * Club domestic league appearances and goals

Miguel Mora Morales (born 3 June 1974) is a Spanish former footballer who played as a goalkeeper.

== Club career ==
Born in Barcelona, Catalonia, Mora was an unsuccessful FC Barcelona youth graduate, spending his first professional years with modest clubs, also mostly in his native region. His biggest success was appearing in 27 matches in 1998–99's Segunda División, with UE Lleida.

Mora moved to neighbouring Portugal in January 2001, first with another lowly side, Madeira's C.F. União. For the 2003–04 season he joined Rio Ave F.C. of the Primeira Liga, and was the Vila do Conde team's first choice for the vast majority of his spell.

In 2007–08, Rio Ave returned from the Segunda Liga but Mora only managed to be backup in the following two top-flight campaigns, successively to Márcio Paiva and Carlos Fernandes, totalling four games. He retired in June 2010 at the age of 36.
