= Francisco Gomes (footballer) =

Portuguese footballer

Personal information
- Full name: Francisco Tomás Aguiar Gomes
- Date of birth: 14 April 2004 (age 22)
- Place of birth: Funchal, Portugal
- Height: 1.75 m (5 ft 9 in)
- Position: Right winger

Team information
- Current team: Marítimo
- Number: 20

Youth career
- 2010–2017: Zenit Saint Petersburg
- 2017–2018: Slavia Prague
- 2018–2023: Marítimo

Senior career*
Years	Team	Apps	(Gls)
2022–2025	Marítimo B	32	(5)
2022–	Marítimo	32	(2)
- * Club domestic league appearances and goals as of 19 June 2026

Francisco Tomás Aguiar Gomes (born 14 April 2004), also known as Xiko, is a Portuguese footballer who plays as a right winger for Primeira Liga club Marítimo.

== Early life ==
Gomes was born in Funchal on the island of Madeira to Danny, who was then an attacking midfielder for Marítimo. When their father went to Russia to play for Zenit Saint Petersburg, Gomes and his identical twin brother Bernardo played for the youth team. The boys were involved in a controversy in September 2011 when their father scored a UEFA Champions League goal against Portuguese club Porto and celebrated by imitating a urinating dog; he explained that it was because he was going to buy them a puppy.

== Career ==
At age 17 in August 2021, the brothers signed professional contracts for Marítimo. On 13 December 2022, Gomes made his first-team debut as a last-minute substitute in a 5–0 Taça da Liga defeat away to Sporting CP, another of his father's previous clubs. After turning 19, the brothers, who were alternating between the under-23 and reserve teams, extended their contract to 2027.

On 3 August 2025, Gomes scored the last goal of a 3–0 win over island rivals Nacional in the Troféu Cidade do Funchal, at the Estádio do Marítimo. He scored twice in 20 games as his team won Liga Portugal 2 in 2025–26; his first goal on 21 December was in a 4–1 win away to Leixões, and his second on 1 May in a 3–2 win in the reverse fixture saw his team crowned champions with two games remaining.

== Honours ==
Marítimo

- Liga Portugal 2: 2025–26
