= Bernardo Gomes (footballer) =

Portuguese footballer (born 2004)

Personal information
- Full name: Bernardo Martim Aguiar Gomes
- Date of birth: 14 April 2004 (age 22)
- Place of birth: Funchal, Portugal
- Height: 1.81 m (5 ft 11 in)
- Position: Midfielder

Team information
- Current team: União de Leiria
- Number: 20

Youth career
- 2010–2017: Zenit Saint Petersburg
- 2017–2018: Slavia Prague
- 2018–2023: Marítimo

Senior career*
Years	Team	Apps	(Gls)
2022–2025	Marítimo B	32	(3)
2023–2025	Marítimo	17	(2)
2025–	União de Leiria	16	(1)

International career
2022	Portugal U18	4	(0)
- * Club domestic league appearances and goals as of 22:29, 19 June 2026 (UTC)

Bernardo Martim Aguiar Gomes (born 14 April 2004) is a Portuguese professional footballer who plays as a midfielder for Liga Portugal 2 club União de Leiria.

== Early life ==
Gomes was born in Funchal on the island of Madeira to Danny, who was then an attacking midfielder for Marítimo. When their father went to Russia to play for Zenit Saint Petersburg, Gomes and his identical twin brother Francisco played for the youth team. The boys were involved in a controversy in September 2011 when their father scored a UEFA Champions League goal against Portuguese club Porto and celebrated by imitating a urinating dog; he explained that it was because he was going to buy them a puppy.

== Club career ==
At age 17 in August 2021, the brothers signed professional contracts for Marítimo. After turning 19 in April 2023, the brothers, who were alternating between the under-23 and reserve teams, extended their contract to 2027.

On 21 January 2024, Gomes played his third league game for the first team and fifth overall, in the Madeira derby against Nacional. On as a substitute in the Liga Portugal 2, he scored the last goal of a 3–1 win. In 2024–25, he was injured for the first half of the season, and returned mostly as a reserve team player, playing three games for the first team.

Gomes joined fellow league team União Leiria, managed by fellow Madeiran Fábio Pereira, on 7 July 2025. On his debut on 10 August, he came on as a 76th-minute substitute for Eboue Kouassi and scored the equaliser in a 3–2 comeback win at home to Académico Viseu.

== International career ==
Gomes was part of the Portugal under-18 team at the 2022 Mediterranean Games in Algeria.
