= Eurípedes Amoreirinha =

Portuguese footballer

Personal information
- Full name: Eurípedes Daniel Adão Amoreirinha
- Date of birth: 5 August 1984 (age 42)
- Place of birth: Vila Franca de Xira, Portugal
- Height: 1.83 m (6 ft 0 in)
- Position: Centre-back

Youth career
- 1995–1996: Vilafranquense
- 1996–1998: Benfica
- 1998–2003: Alverca

Senior career*
| Years | Team | Apps | (Gls) |
| 2003–2004 | Alverca | 33 | (2) |
| 2004–2007 | Benfica | 8 | (0) |
| 2005 | → Estoril (loan) | 8 | (0) |
| 2005–2007 | → Estrela Amadora (loan) | 49 | (1) |
| 2007–2008 | CFR Cluj | 2 | (0) |
| 2008 | → UTA Arad (loan) | 8 | (1) |
| 2009–2011 | Académica | 24 | (0) |
| 2011–2013 | Vitória Setúbal | 20 | (0) |
| 2013 | Churchill Brothers | 0 | (0) |
| 2014 | Benfica Castelo Branco | 13 | (0) |
| 2014–2015 | Santa Clara | 38 | (1) |
| 2015–2016 | Penafiel | 30 | (1) |
| 2016–2018 | Sampedrense | | |
| 2018–2019 | Moimenta da Beira | 25 | (1) |
| Total | | 258 | (7) |

International career
| 2002 | Portugal U18 | 2 | (0) |
| 2002–2003 | Portugal U19 | 14 | (1) |
| 2003–2005 | Portugal U20 | 9 | (0) |
| 2004–2007 | Portugal U21 | 12 | (1) |
Medal record
Men's football
Representing Portugal
UEFA European Under-19 Championship
| Runner-up | 2003 Liechtenstein |
- * Club domestic league appearances and goals

Eurípedes Daniel Adão Amoreirinha (born 5 August 1984) is a Portuguese former professional footballer who played mainly as a central defender.

== Club career ==
A product of S.L. Benfica's youth system, Amoreirinha was born in Vila Franca de Xira, Lisbon, and he made his Primeira Liga debut with farm team F.C. Alverca in 2003, then appeared in eight matches with the former in the 2004–05 season as they won the national title after 11 years. He finished the campaign on loan at modest G.D. Estoril Praia.

After two seasons on loan with C.F. Estrela da Amadora, Amoreirinha was released by Benfica and moved to Romania's CFR Cluj for €1 million, joining the club's massive Portuguese contingent. In February 2008, he was loaned to fellow Liga I side FCM UTA Arad.

Amoreirinha returned to Portugal in January 2009, moving to Académica de Coimbra and being almost exclusively used as a backup in the next top-flight campaigns, after which he was released in June 2011. He met exactly the same fate in the same amount of time in his next club, Vitória de Setúbal.

On 5 August 2014, after an unassuming spell in India and a few months with Sport Benfica e Castelo Branco, Amoreirinha signed for C.D. Santa Clara of Segunda Liga. In June of the following year, he joined F.C. Penafiel in the same league.

== Career statistics ==
| Club | Season | League | | | Cup | | Continental | | Total | |
| Club | Season | Division | Apps | Goals | Apps | Goals | Apps | Goals | Apps | Goals |
|---|---|---|---|---|---|---|---|---|---|---|
| Alverca | 2002–03 | Segunda Liga | 2 | 0 | 1 | 0 | 0 | 0 | 3 | 0 |
| Alverca | 2003–04 | Primeira Liga | 31 | 2 | 1 | 0 | 0 | 0 | 32 | 2 |
| Alverca | Total | | 33 | 2 | 2 | 0 | 0 | 0 | 35 | 2 |
| Benfica | 2004–05 | Primeira Liga | 8 | 0 | 1 | 0 | 3 | 0 | 12 | 0 |
| Estoril | 2004–05 | Primeira Liga | 8 | 0 | 0 | 0 | 0 | 0 | 8 | 0 |
| Estrela Amadora | 2005–06 | Primeira Liga | 21 | 1 | 3 | 2 | 0 | 0 | 24 | 3 |
| Estrela Amadora | 2006–07 | Primeira Liga | 28 | 0 | 2 | 0 | 0 | 0 | 30 | 0 |
| Estrela Amadora | Total | | 49 | 1 | 5 | 2 | 0 | 0 | 54 | 3 |
| CFR Cluj | 2007–08 | Liga I | 2 | 0 | 1 | 0 | 0 | 0 | 3 | 0 |
| UTA Arad | 2007–08 | Liga I | 8 | 1 | 0 | 0 | 0 | 0 | 8 | 1 |
| Académica | 2008–09 | Primeira Liga | 8 | 0 | 0 | 0 | 0 | 0 | 8 | 0 |
| Académica | 2009–10 | Primeira Liga | 10 | 0 | 2 | 0 | 0 | 0 | 12 | 0 |
| Académica | 2010–11 | Primeira Liga | 6 | 0 | 2 | 0 | 0 | 0 | 8 | 0 |
| Académica | Total | | 24 | 0 | 4 | 0 | 0 | 0 | 28 | 1 |
| Vitória Setúbal | 2011–12 | Primeira Liga | 12 | 0 | 0 | 0 | 0 | 0 | 12 | 0 |
| Vitória Setúbal | 2012–13 | Primeira Liga | 8 | 0 | 4 | 1 | 0 | 0 | 12 | 1 |
| Vitória Setúbal | Total | | 20 | 0 | 4 | 1 | 0 | 0 | 24 | 1 |
| Churchill Brothers | 2013–14 | I-League | 0 | 0 | 0 | 0 | 0 | 0 | 0 | 0 |
| Benfica Castelo Branco | 2013–14 | Campeonato Nacional de Seniores | 13 | 0 | 0 | 0 | 0 | 0 | 13 | 0 |
| Santa Clara | 2014–15 | Segunda Liga | 38 | 1 | 3 | 0 | 0 | 0 | 41 | 1 |
| Penafiel | 2015–16 | Segunda Liga | 30 | 1 | 3 | 0 | 0 | 0 | 33 | 1 |
| Sampedrense | 2016–17 | Divisão de Honra | 0 | 0 | 0 | 0 | 0 | 0 | 0 | 0 |
| Sampedrense | 2017–18 | Divisão de Honra | 0 | 0 | 0 | 0 | 0 | 0 | 0 | 0 |
| Moimenta da Beira | 2018–19 | Divisão de Honra | 25 | 1 | 0 | 0 | 0 | 0 | 25 | 1 |
| Career total | | | 258 | 7 | 22 | 3 | 3 | 0 | 283 | 10 |

== Honours ==
Benfica

- Primeira Liga: 2004–05
- Supertaça Cândido de Oliveira runner-up: 2004

CFR Cluj

- Liga I: 2007–08
- Cupa României: 2007–08
