= Anderson (footballer, born 1980) =

Brazilian footballer and manager

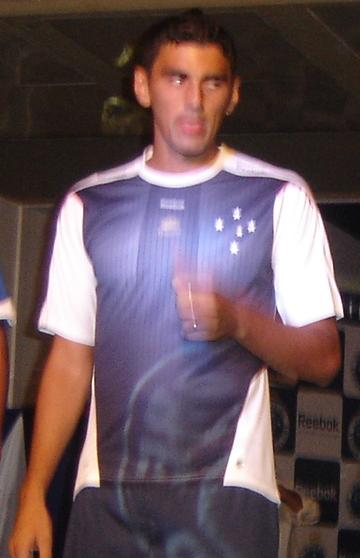

Personal information
- Full name: Anderson Cléber Beraldo
- Date of birth: 27 April 1980 (age 46)
- Place of birth: São Paulo, Brazil
- Height: 1.86 m (6 ft 1 in)
- Position: Centre back

Senior career*
Years	Team	Apps	(Gls)
2000–2005	Corinthians	115	(3)
2005–2007	Benfica	48	(4)
2007–2010	Lyon	13	(1)
2008	→ São Paulo (loan)	6	(0)
2009	→ Cruzeiro (loan)	5	(0)
2011	Santo André	18	(2)
2011–2012	América Mineiro	18	(2)
2012–2013	Paraná	30	(3)

International career
2005	Brazil	1	(1)

Managerial career
- 2016: Portuguesa (youth)
- 2016: Portuguesa
- * Club domestic league appearances and goals

Anderson Cléber Beraldo (born 27 April 1980), simply known as Anderson, is a Brazilian football manager and former player.

== Club career ==
=== Early career ===
Anderson started playing professional football for Corinthians of São Paulo. He played on the team for five consecutive seasons, moving to Portugal in the middle of his sixth season.

=== Benfica and Lyon ===
In the summer of 2005 he was bought by S.L. Benfica of the Primeira Liga. He made his Benfica debut in the 2005 Supertaça Cândido de Oliveira against Vitória de Setúbal on 13 August. Anderson would play alongside Luisão and help his side claim their first Supertaça in sixteen years. He would make his league debut on 20 August against Académica de Coimbra at the Estádio Cidade de Coimbra in a goalless draw. He would score his first league goal for Benfica on 18 September in a league game at the Estádio da Luz in 4–0 victory over União de Leiria.

His first full season with Benfica saw him feature regularly in Benfica's starting eleven under the management of Ronald Koeman. He would play a pivotal role in Benfica's 2005–06 UEFA Champions League campaign where they reached the quarter-final stage where they would end up eliminated by FC Barcelona. Despite Benfica's successful UEFA Champions League campaign, their league campaign would prove to be a disappointing one as they would finish behind rivals Porto and Sporting CP. Anderson would end his first season with forty one appearances with four goals scored.

The 2006–07 season would see a change of manager for Benfica as Ronald Koeman would be replaced by Fernando Santos which changed the fortunes of Anderson's playing time. The arrival of Santos would see Anderson play less regularly. Under Fernando Santos, he would play nineteen league games in the entire season. Following the end of the season, he left Benfica for French side Lyon.

Anderson signed for French side Lyon in a €4 million deal in the summer of 2007. His three-year spell at Lyon would him featured very little. His time with Lyon would see him be loaned to Brazilian sides São Paulo and Cruzeiro. In late 2010, he terminated his contract with Lyon and returned to Brazil.

=== Return to Brazil ===
In early 2011 he returned to Brazil with Esporte Clube Santo André. His stay would be short as he would move clubs again in the same season to América Mineiro. His time with América Mineiro would see him be used primarily as a substitute. In 2012, he would leave América Mineiro for Campeonato Brasileiro Série B side Paraná in a quest to play more first team football.

== International career ==
Anderson's first and only cap for the Brazil national team came on 27 April 2005 against Guatemala as he was called up by then Brazilian manager Carlos Alberto Parreira. He scored one of Brazil's goals in their 3–0 victory.

== Career statistics ==
Score and result list Brazil's goal tally first, score column indicates score after Anderson goal.

International goal scored by Anderson
No.	Date	Venue	Opponent	Score	Result	Competition
1	27 April 2005	Estádio do Morumbi, São Paulo, Brazil	Guatemala		3–0	Friendly

== Honours ==
Corinthians

- Campeonato Brasileiro Série A: 2005
- Copa do Brasil: 2002
- Torneio Rio – São Paulo: 2002
- Campeonato Paulista: 2001, 2003

Benfica

- Supertaça Cândido de Oliveira: 2005

Lyon

- Ligue 1: 2007–08
- Coupe de France: 2008

São Paulo

- Campeonato Brasileiro Série A: 2008

Cruzeiro

- Campeonato Mineiro: 2009

Brazil

- Lunar New Year Cup: 2005
