= Ricardo Fernandes (footballer, born January 1978) =

Portuguese footballer

Personal information
- Full name: Ricardo Manuel da Silva Fernandes
- Date of birth: 14 January 1978 (age 48)
- Place of birth: Azurém, Portugal
- Height: 1.82 m (6 ft 0 in)
- Position: Centre-back

Youth career
- 1988–1997: Vitória Guimarães

Senior career*
| Years | Team | Apps | (Gls) |
| 1997–1999 | Fafe | 43 | (3) |
| 1999–2003 | Salgueiros | 112 | (0) |
| 2003–2005 | Moreirense | 51 | (0) |
| 2005–2008 | Nacional | 82 | (4) |
| 2008–2010 | Rapid București | 47 | (4) |
| 2011 | Rio Ave | 0 | (0) |
| 2011–2013 | Moreirense | 37 | (2) |
| 2013–2016 | Fafe | 65 | (2) |
| 2016–2017 | Torcatense | 8 | (0) |
| 2017–2018 | Pevidém | 1 | (0) |
| Total | | 446 | (15) |

International career
| 2001 | Portugal B | 1 | (0) |
- * Club domestic league appearances and goals

Ricardo Manuel da Silva Fernandes (born 14 January 1978) is a Portuguese former professional footballer who played as a central defender.

== Club career ==
Fernandes was born in the village of Azurém, Guimarães. After making his Primeira Liga debut with lowly S.C. Salgueiros, which folded soon after, he moved to Moreirense FC, spending a further two top-flight seasons there. For 2005–06 he joined Madeira's C.D. Nacional, being an undisputed starter from the beginning and helping them to achieve a fifth place (with the subsequent qualification for the UEFA Cup) in his first year.

Fernandes signed with Romania's FC Rapid București on 10 June 2008, alongside compatriot José Peseiro whom arrived as manager. In the 2010–11 campaign he lost his starting position at the Liga I club and, in January 2011, aged 33, returned to his country and joined Rio Ave FC.

In June 2011, having made no official appearances for the Vila do Conde team, Fernandes signed with his former employers Moreirense in the Segunda Liga. He only missed four league games in his first season, as the Moreira de Cónegos side returned to the top division after seven years.

== International career ==
Fernandes won one cap for Portugal B, playing the first half of a 0–1 defeat to Romania in the Vale do Tejo Tournament held in Santarém, on 25 January 2001.
