= Flávio Cerqueira =

Portuguese footballer (born 1985)

Flávio
Personal information
- Full name: Flávio Abel Sousa Cerqueira
- Date of birth: August 23, 1981 (age 45)
- Place of birth: Porto, Portugal
- Height: 1.83 m (6 ft 0 in)
- Position: Centre back

Youth career
- 1992–2000: Boavista

Senior career*
Years	Team	Apps	(Gls)
2000–2003	Boavista	0	(0)
2000–2002	→ Espinho (loan)	21	(0)
2002–2003	→ Aves (loan)	3	(0)
2003–2004	Salgueiros	22	(0)
2004–2005	Dragões Sandinenses	29	(1)
2005–2007	Vitória Setúbal	4	(0)
2005–2006	Vitória Setúbal B	16	(1)
2007–2008	Leça	12	(0)
2008–2009	Lousada	27	(0)
2009–2010	Paredes	28	(3)
2010–2011	AD Oliveirense	27	(2)
2011–2012	Boavista	5	(0)
2012–2013	Coimbrões	19	(0)
2013	AD Oliveirense	4	(0)
2014–2019	Grijó	164	(6)
- * Club domestic league appearances and goals

Flávio Abel Sousa Cerqueira (born 9 May 1985 in Porto) is a Portuguese retired footballer who played as a central defender.
