= Roberto (footballer, born 1977) =

Brazilian footballer

Personal information
- Full name: Roberto Alcântara Ballesteros
- Date of birth: 25 July 1977 (age 49)
- Place of birth: Osasco, Brazil
- Height: 1.85 m (6 ft 1 in)
- Position: Striker

Team information
- Current team: Audax (head coach)

Senior career*
Years	Team	Apps	(Gls)
1998–2003	Volta Redonda		
1999	→ Juventus-SP (loan)		
2001–2002	→ Vila Nova (loan)		
2003–2006	Penafiel	93	(36)
2006–2009	Leixões	60	(23)
2009–2011	Feirense	55	(19)
2011–2012	Arouca	26	(1)

Managerial career
- 2025: Audax U15
- 2026–: Audax
- * Club domestic league appearances and goals

Roberto Alcântara Ballesteros (born 25 July 1977), known simply as Roberto, is a Brazilian football coach and former player who played as a striker. He is the current head coach of Audax.

He spent the vast majority of his professional career in Portugal, representing four clubs and amassing Primeira Liga totals of 83 matches and 19 goals over four seasons.

== Club career ==
Born in Osasco, São Paulo, Roberto played mainly for Volta Redonda Futebol Clube in his country, also being loaned twice during his contract. In February 2003, he moved to Portugal and joined F.C. Penafiel, scoring 20 second division goals in his first full season, which ended in Primeira Liga promotion. He netted only 13 the following two combined, however, with the team being relegated in 2006.

Roberto then returned to the Portuguese second level, with Leixões SC, scoring 17 goals in 30 games in his first year en route to another promotion. After an average 2007–08, he could only appear in three matches the following campaign as the Matosinhos side finished in sixth position, mainly due to injury.

In the summer of 2009, aged 32, Roberto returned to the second tier as he signed for C.D. Feirense. He scored nine league goals in his second season, being an essential attacking player as the club returned to the top flight after an absence of 23 years.

Roberto joined F.C. Arouca of the second division on 2 August 2011.
