= Rui Nereu =

Portuguese footballer

Personal information
- Full name: Rui Miguel Nereu de Branco Batista
- Date of birth: 4 February 1986 (age 40)
- Place of birth: Alcanena, Portugal
- Height: 1.83 m (6 ft 0 in)
- Position: Goalkeeper

Youth career
- 1995–2005: Benfica

Senior career*
Years	Team	Apps	(Gls)
2005–2006	Benfica B	7	(0)
2005–2007	Benfica	4	(0)
2007–2010	Académica	16	(0)
2011–2012	Arouca	22	(0)
2013	Mirandela	14	(0)
2013–2014	Freamunde	30	(0)
2014–2015	Tondela	10	(0)
2015–2017	Freamunde	33	(0)
Total		136	(0)

International career
2003	Portugal U17	2	(0)
- * Club domestic league appearances and goals

Rui Miguel Nereu de Branco Batista (born 4 February 1986), known as Nereu, is a Portuguese former professional footballer who played as a goalkeeper.

== Club career ==
Nereu was born in Alcanena, Santarém District. A product of S.L. Benfica's youth system, he made his senior debut on 18 October 2005 during a UEFA Champions League group stage game at Villarreal CF, after an early injury to Quim. He first appeared in the Primeira Liga four days later, as the same thing happened in a 2–0 home win over C.F. Estrela da Amadora; he again took the field against the Spaniards in the Champions League group phase, featuring the full 90 minutes of the 0–1 home loss.

As habitual backup José Moreira was also injured Nereu, who had also played with the club's reserves before their extinction, went on to take part in two more matches. In 2007, he was sold to Académica de Coimbra, backing up veteran Pedro Roma in his first season. However, following the signing of Slovak Boris Peškovič, he was further demoted to third-choice.

From January 2011 to June 2012, Nereu represented F.C. Arouca of the Segunda Liga, playing 14 games in his only full campaign. He subsequently alternated between his country's second and third tiers.
