= Geovanni =

Brazilian footballer (born 1980)

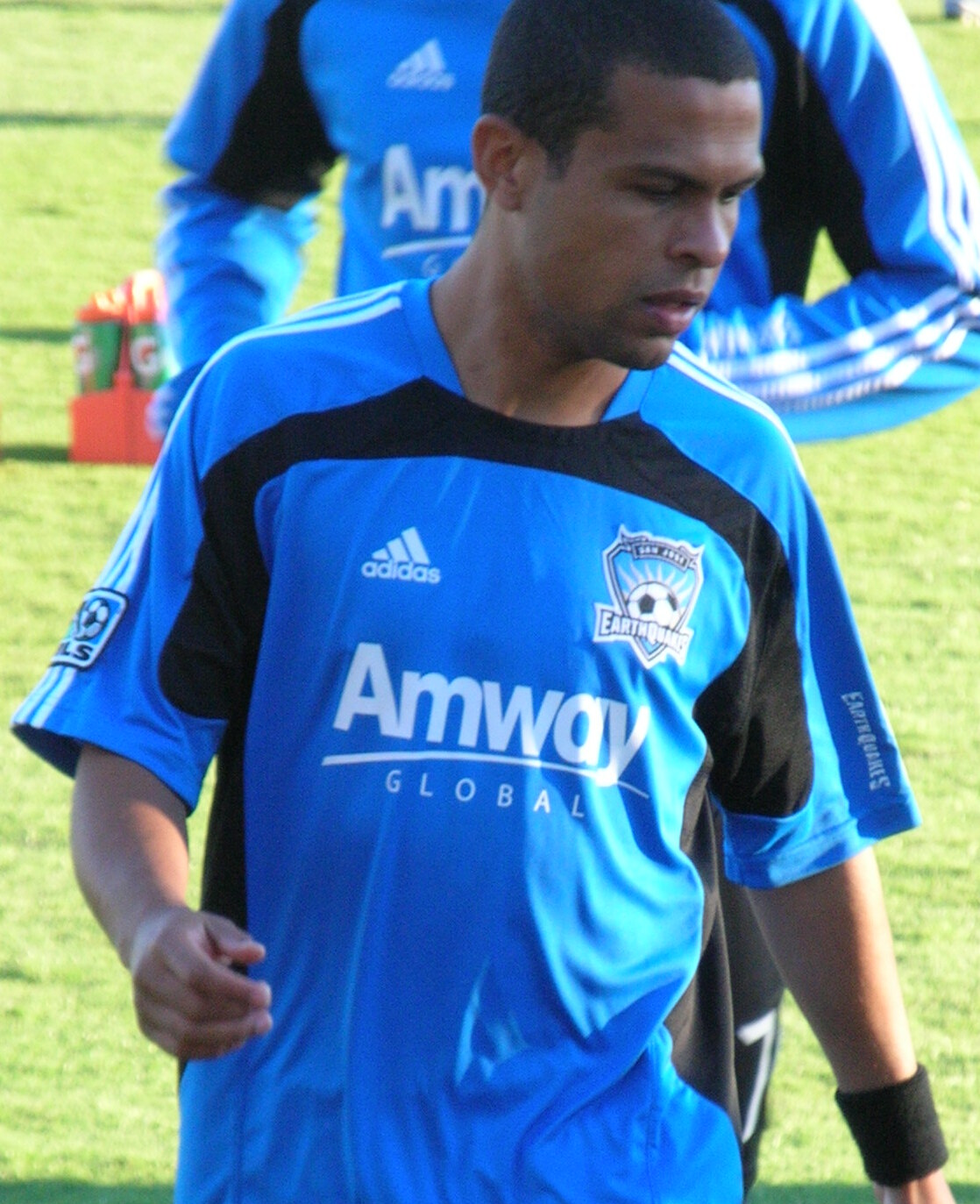
- Geovanni with San Jose Earthquakes in 2010

Personal information
- Full name: Geovanni Deiberson Maurício Gómez
- Date of birth: 11 January 1980 (age 46)
- Place of birth: Acaiaca, Minas Gerais, Brazil
- Height: 1.72 m (5 ft 8 in)
- Positions: Attacking midfielder; winger

Senior career*
Years	Team	Apps	(Gls)
1997–2001	Cruzeiro	46	(12)
1998–1999	→ América-MG (loan)	15	(1)
2001–2003	Barcelona	26	(1)
2003	→ Benfica (loan)	17	(3)
2003–2006	Benfica	74	(13)
2006–2007	Cruzeiro	14	(2)
2007–2008	Manchester City	19	(3)
2008–2010	Hull City	60	(11)
2010	San Jose Earthquakes	12	(1)
2011–2012	Vitória	37	(3)
2012–2013	América-MG	10	(1)
2013	Bragantino	11	(1)
Total		341	(52)

International career
2000	Brazil U23	6	(0)
2001	Brazil	1	(0)
- * Club domestic league appearances and goals

Geovanni Deiberson Maurício Gómez (born 11 January 1980), known simply as Geovanni, is a Brazilian former professional footballer. He was mostly used as an attacking midfielder but was also able to play on both wings and up front.

== Club career ==
=== Early career ===
When Geovanni emerged from the youth set-up at Cruzeiro most Brazilian critics were intrigued by his talents and believed he could become a great player at the highest level. When Geovanni was 18 he enjoyed a successful loan spell at America, scoring one goal in 15 games at the right wing position. He instantly commanded a first team place at the Brazilian team. Once his loan spell had finished he immediately found his way into the first team of Cruzeiro and was a fan favourite at the Belo Horizonte club.

=== Barcelona ===
Geovanni was purchased by Barcelona for $18 million in summer 2001, signing a four-year deal, despite reported interest from Juventus. Geovanni scored his first goal for Barcelona against Real Zaragoza. Geovanni made 21 La Liga appearances scoring 1 goal, mostly as a substitute. In his second season, he fell out with coach Carles Rexach and was not featured in Barcelona's starting 11 for the majority of the season and only played 5 league matches. Geovanni was then loaned out to Portuguese club Benfica the following season.

=== Benfica ===
In 2003 Geovanni agreed on terms with Benfica and was signed on a free transfer, agreeing to a four-year deal, after an impressive spell with Benfica on loan from Barcelona. He scored his first goal for Benfica against Braga scoring a free kick. He was a mainstay in the Benfica starting line-up and was hugely involved in winning 3 trophies for Benfica, the Portuguese Cup, Portuguese League and Portuguese Super Cup. Moreover, he was named "Benfica Player of the Year" in 2004 and 2005.

Some of Geovanni's memorable goals include a late winning free-kick against Sporting CP in the Lisbon derby at Estádio José Alvalade on 2 May 2004, helping giving Benfica access to the 2004–05 UEFA Champions League, as well as a diving header in the 2005–06 UEFA Champions League against Manchester United at the Estádio da Luz on 7 December 2005.

Despite having a successful spell at Benfica, Geovanni cancelled his contract after having family troubles and returned to Brazil.

=== Return to Brazil ===
In 2006 Geovanni rejoined Cruzeiro, signing a three-year deal. He was greeted at the airport by over 1,000 fans. Geovanni made his début scoring twice against Botafogo.

=== Manchester City ===
In July 2007, after being turned down by Portsmouth following a trial, he decided to join Manchester City on a one-year deal on 17 July 2007. On 11 August, Geovanni scored on his début for City in a 2–0 victory over West Ham United. The following week, he started and scored the only goal in City's 1–0 win over local rivals Manchester United to continue Manchester City's 100% start to the season. Geovanni also scored against Wigan Athletic on 1 December 2007. On 3 July 2008, he was released by Manchester City.

=== Hull City ===
On 5 July 2008 it was announced that Geovanni would be joining Hull City on a two-year contract. He scored Hull's first ever Premier League goal on his début against Fulham on 16 August and was voted Man of the Match.

On 27 September he scored his second Premier League goal for City with a 25-yard equalizer against Arsenal. Hull would go on to score again and record their first ever away win over Arsenal, defeating the London club 2–1. The following weekend, Geovanni scored a 30-yard free kick in a 1–0 victory against Tottenham Hotspur at White Hart Lane. His form for Hull earned high praise from Hull chairman Paul Duffen and Luis Felipe Scolari.

Geovanni went on to score goals against West Bromwich Albion, a penalty kick against Manchester United in a seven-goal thriller, and during a 2–2 home draw against former club Manchester City on 16 November.

He finished the season as Hull's top goalscorer as they narrowly avoided relegation. He signed a new two-year contract with Hull in September 2009, which would expire in June 2011.

Geovanni started well in the 2009–10 season for Hull City scoring four goals in just seven games, including strikes against Southend United in the League Cup, and league goals against Wolverhampton Wanderers, Liverpool, and Wigan Athletic. On 31 October 2009, Geovanni was sent off against Burnley after receiving two bookings. At the end of the season following Hull's relegation, he agreed to cancel his contract.

=== San Jose Earthquakes ===
On 16 August 2010, Geovanni agreed to terms with the San Jose Earthquakes of Major League Soccer, becoming the club's first designated player. On 20 August 2010, it was announced that Geovanni will wear the number 77 shirt and make his debut against the Los Angeles Galaxy on 21 August 2010 in the California Clasico. On 5 September 2010, Geovanni made his first start for the Earthquakes and notched a goal and an assist in a 2–1 away win against the Houston Dynamo. Geovanni's option on his contract was not picked up by the club at the end of the 2010 season.

=== Vitória ===
On 30 January 2011, Geovanni was announced as the new player of Vitória. On 27 February, he scored twice in a 2–0 win against Bahia de Feira. Two weeks later, he netted a goal and delivered an assist in a 4–2 win against Juazeiro.

== International career ==
Geovanni's first and only international appearance for Brazil's was in a 1–0 defeat to Mexico in the 2001 Copa América. Geovanni has also represented Brazil in the 2000 Olympic football tournament.

== Career statistics ==
=== Club ===
Appearances and goals by club, season and competition
Club	Season	League			National cup (Note: Includes Copa do Brasil, Copa del Rey, Taça de Portugal, FA Cup.)		League cup (Note: Includes Football League Cup.)		Continental		Total	
Club	Season	Division	Apps	Goals	Apps	Goals	Apps	Goals	Apps	Goals	Apps	Goals
Cruzeiro	1997	Série A	7	0	—		—		—		7	0
América-MG	1998	Série A	15	1	2	0	—		—		17	1
Cruzeiro	1999	Série A	17	2	—		—		—		17	2
Cruzeiro	2000	Série A	22	9	11	5	—		—		33	14
Cruzeiro	Total		39	11	11	5	0	0	0	0	50	16
Barcelona	2001–02	La Liga	21	1	—		—		10	0	31	1
Barcelona	2002–03	La Liga	5	0	—		—		5	1	10	1
Barcelona	Total		26	1	0	0	0	0	15	1	41	2
Benfica	2002–03	Primeira Liga	17	3	—		—		—		17	3
Benfica	2003–04	Primeira Liga	20	5	—		—		8	1	28	6
Benfica	2004–05	Primeira Liga	30	6	—		—		7	0	37	6
Benfica	2005–06	Primeira Liga	24	2	—		—		8	1	32	3
Benfica	Total		91	16	0	0	0	0	23	2	114	18
Cruzeiro	2006	Série A	12	2	—		—		—		12	2
Cruzeiro	2007	Série A	2	0	5	0	—		—		7	0
Cruzeiro	Total		14	2	5	0	0	0	0	0	17	2
Manchester City	2007–08	Premier League	19	3	1	0	3	0	—		20	3
Hull City	2008–09	Premier League	34	8	3	0	0	0	—		37	8
Hull City	2009–10	Premier League	26	3	1	1	1	1	—		28	5
Hull City	Total		60	11	4	1	1	1	0	0	65	13
Career total			271	45	23	6	4	1	38	3	336	55

== Honours ==
Cruzeiro

- Copa do Brasil: 2000
- Recopa Sudamericana: 1998

Benfica

- Primeira Liga: 2004–05
- Taça de Portugal: 2003–04
- Supertaça Cândido de Oliveira: 2005

Brazil U17

- South American Under-17 Football Championship: 1997
- FIFA U-17 World Championship: 1997

Brazil U23

- CONMEBOL Men Pre-Olympic Tournament: 1999
