= Fábio Hempel =

Brazilian footballer (born 1980)

Personal information
- Full name: Fábio Hermínio Hempel
- Date of birth: October 29, 1980 (age 45)
- Place of birth: Cascavel, Brazil
- Height: 1.85 m (6 ft 1 in)
- Position: Striker

Senior career*
Years	Team	Apps	(Gls)
1998–1999	Feirense	0	(0)
1999–2000	Caçadores Taipas	–	(–)
2000–2001	Limianos	–	(–)
2001–2002	Esposende	8	(0)
2002–2003	Académico Viseu	33	(17)
2003–2004	Salgueiros	34	(25)
2004–2005	Gil Vicente	8	(2)
2005	→ Estrela Amadora (loan)	4	(1)
2005–2006	Vitória Setúbal	17	(0)
2006–2007	Vitória Guimarães	9	(1)
2007–2008	Foolad	9	(3)
2008	Marília	–	(–)
2008–2009	Mineros de Guayana	3	(0)
2009	União Madeira	13	(2)
2010	Santa Cruz	–	(–)
2010	Campinense	0	(0)
- * Club domestic league appearances and goals

Fábio Hermínio Hempel (Persian: فبيو همپل, born October 29, 1980, in Cascavel, Paraná, Brazil) is a Brazilian football player who plays for União da Madeira. He is usually plays in the striker position.

Fábio has played for Gil Vicente and Vitória Setúbal in the Portuguese Liga. He also played for Mineros de Guayana, a Venezuelan football club, after being released by Foolad FC in Iran's Premier Football League.
