= João Paulo (footballer, born 1980) =

Portuguese footballer (born 1980)

Personal information
- Full name: João Paulo Pinto Ribeiro
- Date of birth: 8 April 1980 (age 46)
- Place of birth: Porto, Portugal
- Height: 1.87 m (6 ft 2 in)
- Position: Centre-forward

Youth career
- 1990–1995: Paredes
- 1995–1999: Boavista

Senior career*
Years	Team	Apps	(Gls)
1999–2005	Boavista	5	(0)
1999	→ Aves (loan)	10	(0)
2000	→ Feirense (loan)	14	(5)
2000–2001	→ Vitória Setúbal (loan)	18	(6)
2002–2003	→ Varzim (loan)	21	(0)
2003–2004	→ Beira-Mar (loan)	19	(3)
2004–2005	→ Estoril (loan)	28	(5)
2005	Tenerife	6	(0)
2006–2007	Paços Ferreira	32	(5)
2007	União Leiria	17	(8)
2008–2010	Rapid București	40	(3)
2010	Leixões	11	(2)
2010–2011	Olympiakos Nicosia	25	(16)
2011–2012	Apollon Limassol	24	(4)
2012–2013	Estoril	7	(0)
2013–2014	Aves	14	(1)
2014–2015	Famalicão	19	(4)
2015	Tirsense	4	(0)
2017–2019	Foz	23	(5)
Total		337	(67)

International career
1996	Portugal U15	6	(5)
1997	Portugal U17	3	(0)
1998–1999	Portugal U18	9	(4)
2000	Portugal U20	7	(2)
2000–2002	Portugal U21	8	(0)
2003	Portugal B	1	(1)
- * Club domestic league appearances and goals

João Paulo Pinto Ribeiro (born 8 April 1980), known as João Paulo, is a Portuguese former footballer who played as a centre-forward.

Over nine seasons, he amassed Primeira Liga totals of 140 games and 23 goals for Boavista, Varzim, Beira-Mar, Estoril (two spells), Paços de Ferreira, União de Leiria and Leixões. He also competed professionally in Spain, Romania and Cyprus, mainly at the service of Rapid București.

== Club career ==
Having grown through the ranks of Boavista FC, Porto-born João Paulo appeared very little for its first team, being loaned five times for the duration of his contract in both the Primeira Liga and the Segunda Liga of Portuguese football. His debut in the top flight came in the 2001–02 season.

After being released in June 2005, João Paulo had an unassuming stint with Spanish Segunda División club CD Tenerife, then returned to Portugal in January of the following year with F.C. Paços de Ferreira. He blossomed as a striker in 2007–08 at fellow top-division side U.D. Leiria (eight goals in the league and two in the UEFA Cup, both against Bayer 04 Leverkusen, on home and away legs).

João Paulo moved to Romanian club FC Rapid București in January 2008, while Leiria would eventually rank last at the season's end in Portugal. Later that month but two years later, after failing to score more than three times in spite of being regularly played, he returned to his country and joined top-tier strugglers Leixões S.C. until the end of the campaign.

In June 2010, following Leixões' relegation, João Paulo returned abroad, signing with Olympiakos Nicosia of Cyprus. The following season, the 31-year-old switched to another team in the country, Apollon Limassol FC.

== Honours ==
Portugal

- UEFA European Under-18 Championship: 1999
