= Márcio Paiva =

Portuguese footballer

Personal information
- Full name: Márcio Henrique Silva Paiva
- Date of birth: 31 July 1980 (age 46)
- Place of birth: Folgosa, Portugal
- Height: 1.83 m (6 ft 0 in)
- Position: Goalkeeper

Youth career
- 1990–1999: Maia

Senior career*
Years	Team	Apps	(Gls)
1999–2005	Maia	99	(0)
2005–2006	Vitória Guimarães	8	(0)
2006–2007	Feirense	25	(0)
2007–2009	Rio Ave	48	(0)
2009–2010	Doxa	22	(0)
2012–2013	Famalicão	38	(0)
2013–2015	Feirense	52	(0)
2015–2016	União Leiria	32	(0)
2016	Oliveirense	8	(0)
2017	Farense	6	(0)
2017–2019	Felgueiras 1932	46	(0)
2019–2021	Maia Lidador	32	(0)
Total		416	(0)
- * Club domestic league appearances and goals

Márcio Henrique Silva Paiva (born 31 July 1980 in Folgosa, Maia, Porto District) is a Portuguese former professional footballer who played as a goalkeeper.
