= Heitor (Portuguese footballer) =

Portuguese football manager and former player

Personal information
- Full name: Mário Heitor Brandão de Andrade
- Date of birth: 2 May 1978 (age 48)
- Place of birth: Porto, Portugal
- Height: 1.85 m (6 ft 1 in)
- Position: Forward

Team information
- Current team: Gondim-Maia (manager)

Senior career*
Years	Team	Apps	(Gls)
1997–2002	Ermesinde		
2002–2004	Tirsense		
2004–2005	Beira-Mar	17	(2)
2005–2006	Vitória de Setúbal	4	(0)
2006	→ Portimonense (loan)	11	(1)
2006	Trofense	1	(0)
2007	Famalicão		
2008–2011	Salgueiros		

Managerial career
- 2009–2010: Salgueiros (U13)
- 2011: Oliveira Douro (assistant)
- 2011–2012: Oliveira Douro
- 2013–2016: Leça do Balio
- 2016–: Gondim-Maia
- * Club domestic league appearances and goals

Mário Heitor Brandão de Andrade (born 2 May 1978), known as Heitor, is a Portuguese football manager and a former player. He currently coaches Gondim-Maia.

== Career ==
Heitor made his Primeira Liga debut for Beira-Mar on 24 September 2004 in a game against Vitória de Setúbal.
