= 2004–05 FC Porto season =

FC Porto
2004–05 season
- Manager: Luigi Delneri; Víctor Fernández; José Couceiro
- Primeira Liga: 2nd
- Champions League: Round of 16
- Taça de Portugal: Round of 32
- Supertaça Cândido de Oliveira: Winners
- UEFA Super Cup: Runners-up
- Intercontinental Cup: Winners
- Top goalscorer: League: Benni McCarthy (11); All: Benni McCarthy (14)
Home colours	Away colours

FC Porto followed up its UEFA Champions League victory with a chaotic season, following the departure of coach José Mourinho and several key players. Initial coach Luigi Delneri was sacked even before the season started, due to too little presence in his new town in pre-season. New signings Ricardo Quaresma, Pepe, Giourkas Seitaridis, Luís Fabiano, Raul Meireles and Diego looked spectacular on paper, but in reality, Porto had a miserable offensive performance, culminating in just 39 league goals and a loss of the league title to arch rivals Benfica. As a consolation, it won the Intercontinental Cup title with a victory against Once Caldas on penalties.

== Squad ==
=== Goalkeepers ===
- (Portugal) Vítor Baía
- (Portugal) Nuno

=== Defenders ===
- (Portugal) Jorge Costa
- (Angola) (Portugal) Pedro Emanuel
- (Portugal) (Brazil) Pepe
- (Portugal) Ricardo Costa
- (Portugal) Miguel Areias
- (Portugal) Nuno Valente
- (Portugal) César Peixoto
- (Portugal) José Bosingwa
- (Greece) Giourkas Seitaridis
- (Portugal) Mário Silva
- (Brazil) (Portugal) Evaldo

=== Midfielders ===
- (Brazil) Leandro
- (Portugal) Hugo Leal
- (Brazil) (Italy) Diego
- (Portugal) Ricardo Quaresma
- (Portugal) Maniche
- (Brazil) Carlos Alberto
- (Portugal) Raul Meireles
- (Brazil) Léo Lima
- (Portugal) Ricardo Fernandes
- (Brazil) Ibson

=== Attackers ===
- (Brazil) Luís Fabiano
- (Brazil) (Portugal) Derlei
- (Brazil) (Portugal) Maciel
- (Portugal) Hélder Postiga
- (Portugal) Hugo Almeida
- (South Africa) Benni McCarthy
- (Brazil) (Italy) Pitbull

== Primeira Liga ==
=== League table ===
Pos	Team	Pld	W	D	L	GF	GA	GD	Pts	Qualification or relegation
1	Benfica (C)	34	19	8	7	51	31	+20	65	Qualification to Champions League group stage
2	Porto	34	17	11	6	39	26	+13	62	Qualification to Champions League group stage
3	Sporting CP	34	18	7	9	66	36	+30	61	Qualification to Champions League third qualifying round
4	Braga	34	16	10	8	45	28	+17	58	Qualification to UEFA Cup first round
5	Vitória de Guimarães	34	15	9	10	38	29	+9	54	Qualification to UEFA Cup first round

Source: Foradejogo
Rules for classification: 1) points; 2) head-to-head points; 3) head-to-head goal difference; 4) goal difference; 5) number of goals scored
(C) Champions

=== Matches ===
- Porto-União de Leiria 1-1
- 1-0 Ricardo Quaresma 8'
- 1-1 Petar Krpan 75'
- Braga-Porto 1-1
- 0-1 Maniche 3'
- 1-1 Wender 60' (pen.)
- Porto-Estoril 2-2
- 0-1 Ousmane N'Doye 13'
- 1-1 Luís Fabiano 17'
- 1-2 Pinheiro 44'
- 2-2 Pepe 69'
- Vitória de Guimarães-Porto 0-1
- 0-1 Costinha 83'
- Porto-Belenenses 3-0
- 1-0 Maniche 34'
- 2-0 Benni McCarthy 72'
- 3-0 Benni McCarthy 90'
- Benfica-Porto 0-1
- 0-1 Benni McCarthy 10'
- Porto-Penafiel 2-0
- 1-0 Benni McCarthy 14'
- 2-0 Benni McCarthy 25'
- Nacional-Porto 2-2
- 0-1 Diego 1'
- 0-2 Benni McCarthy 51'
- 1-2 Raul Meireles 90 + 2' (o.g.)
- 2-2 Adriano 90 + 4'
- Porto-Sporting CP 3-0
- 1-0 Benni McCarthy 57'
- 2-0 Diego 81'
- 3-0 Carlos Alberto 87'
- Gil Vicente-Porto 0-2
- 0-1 Ricardo Quaresma 31'
- 0-2 Costinha 87'
- Porto-Boavista 0-1
- 0-1 Cafú 90 + 3'
- Vitória Setúbal-Porto 0-1
- 0-1 Jorge Costa 24'
- Porto-Beira-Mar 0-1
- 0-1 Beto 38'
- Marítimo-Porto 1-1
- 1-0 Pena 13'
- 1-1 Luís Fabiano 33'
- Porto-Moreirense 1-0
- 1-0 Maniche 26'
- Porto-Rio Ave 1-1
- 0-1 Gaúcho 28'
- 1-1 Luís Fabiano 73'
- Académica-Porto 0-0
- União de Leiria-Porto 0-1
- 0-1 Ricardo Costa 17'
- Porto-Braga 1-3
- 0-1 João Tomás 22'
- 1-1 Diego 33' (pen.)
- 1-2 Wender 42'
- 1-3 João Tomás 76'
- Estoril-Porto 1-2
- 0-1 José Bosingwa 19'
- 0-2 Ricardo Quaresma 23'
- 1-2 Fellahi 38' (pen.)
- Porto-Vitória de Guimarães 0-0
- Belenenses-Porto 0-1
- 0-1 Costinha 47'
- Porto-Benfica 1-1
- 1-0 Benni McCarthy 66'
- 1-1 Geovanni 77'
- Penafiel-Porto 1-2
- 1-0 Wesley 1'
- 1-1 Pedro Emanuel 80'
- 1-2 Benni McCarthy 90 + 3'
- Porto-Nacional 0-4
- 0-1 Miguel Fidalgo 4'
- 0-2 Alonso 60'
- 0-3 Nuno Viveiros 69'
- 0-4 Bruno 84'
- Sporting CP-Porto 2-0
- 1-0 Liédson 62' (pen.)
- 2-0 Carlos Martins 90 + 4'
- Porto-Gil Vicente 1-0
- 1-0 Hélder Postiga 37'
- Boavista-Porto 1-0
- 1-0 Cadú 52'
- Porto-Vitória Setúbal 2-1
- 0-1 Albert Meyong 26'
- 1-1 Hélder Postiga 41'
- 2-1 Ricardo Quaresma 60'
- Beira-Mar-Porto 0-1
- 0-1 Ricardo Quaresma 90'
- Porto-Marítimo 1-0
- 1-0 Benni McCarthy 27'
- Moreirense-Porto 1-1
- 1-0 Nei 9'
- 1-1 Hélder Postiga 75'
- Rio Ave-Porto 0-2
- 0-1 Benni McCarthy 56'
- 0-2 Leandro 79'
- Porto-Académica 1-1
- 1-0 Ibson 61'
- 1-1 Joeano 90'

=== Topscorers ===
- (South Africa) Benni McCarthy 11
- (Portugal) Ricardo Quaresma 4
- (Brazil) Luís Fabiano 3
- (Brazil) Diego 3
- (Portugal) Hélder Postiga 3

=== Taça de Portugal ===
27 October 2004 Fourth round	Vitória de Guimarães	2–1	Porto	Estádio D. Afonso Henriques, Guimarães
	Nuno Assis 57', 73'		Derlei 81'	Referee: Lucílio Baptista

=== UEFA Champions League ===
==== Group stage ====
Pos	Team	Pld	W	D	L	GF	GA	GD	Pts	Qualification
1	(England) Chelsea	6	4	1	1	10	3	+7	13	Advance to knockout stage
2	(Portugal) Porto	6	2	2	2	4	6	−2	8	Advance to knockout stage
3	(Russia) CSKA Moscow	6	2	1	3	5	5	0	7	Transfer to UEFA Cup
4	(France) Paris Saint-Germain	6	1	2	3	3	8	−5	5	

- Porto-CSKA Moskva 0-0
- Chelsea-Porto 3-1
- 1-0 Alexey Smertin 7'
- 2-0 Didier Drogba 50'
- 2-1 Benni McCarthy 68'
- 3-1 John Terry 70'
- Paris Saint-Germain-Porto 2-0
- 1-0 Charles-Édouard Coridon 30'
- 2-0 Pauleta 31'
- Porto-Paris Saint-Germain 0-0
- CSKA Moskva-Porto 0-1
- 0-1 Benni McCarthy 28'
- Porto-Chelsea 2-1
- 0-1 Damien Duff 33'
- 1-1 Diego 60'
- 2-1 Benni McCarthy 85'

==== First knockout round ====
- Porto-Internazionale 1-1
- 0-1 Obafemi Martins 23'
- 1-1 Ricardo Costa 61'
- Internazionale-Porto 3-1
- 1-0 Adriano 5'
- 2-0 Adriano 63'
- 2-1 Jorge Costa 69'
- 3-1 Adriano 87'
