= 2004 Supertaça Cândido de Oliveira =

- Event: Supertaça Cândido de Oliveira (Portuguese Super Cup)
Benfica	Porto
0	1
- Date: 20 August 2004
- Venue: Estádio Cidade de Coimbra, Coimbra
- Man of the Match: Ricardo Quaresma (Porto)
- Referee: Carlos Xistra (Castelo Branco)
- Attendance: 22,023

The 2004 Supertaça Cândido de Oliveira was the 26th edition of the Supertaça Cândido de Oliveira, the annual Portuguese football season-opening match contested by the winners of the previous season's top league and cup competitions (or cup runner-up in case the league- and cup-winning club is the same). The match was contested between the 2003–04 Primeira Liga winners, Porto and the 2003–04 Taça de Portugal winners, Benfica.

The match took place at Estádio Cidade de Coimbra in Coimbra on 20 August 2004. Porto were making their 21st Supertaça appearance, of which it had previously won 13 and lost 7. Benfica were making their 13th Supertaça appearance, having previously won 3 and lost 9 times.

In Portugal, the final was televised live on RTP1. Porto defeated Benfica 1–0 with a goal in the 55th minute from the newly acquired Ricardo Quaresma. Porto collected a second consecutive Supertaça, raising the club's tally to a record 14 trophies in the competition (53.8% of wins).

== Background ==
Benfica were appearing in their 13th Supertaça Cândido de Oliveira. Benfica went into the match as three-time winners of the trophy (1980, 1985, 1989). Of their 12 Supertaça appearances, Benfica had lost on 9 occasions (1981, 1983, 1984, 1986, 1987, 1991, 1993, 1994, 1996). Porto were appearing in their 21st Supertaça Cândido de Oliveira. Porto went into the match as 13-time winners (1981, 1983, 1984, 1986, 1990, 1991, 1993, 1994, 1996, 1998, 1999, 2001, 2003). Of their 20 appearances, Porto had lost on 7 occasions (1979, 1985, 1988, 1992, 1995, 1997, 2000).

In Benfica's and Porto's entire history, both sides had met on 202 occasions prior to this encounter. They had met in the Supertaça on nine occasions, with Porto winning eight SuperCup encounters and Benfica winning once. The last meeting between these two sides in this competition was the 1996 edition of the Supertaça, where Porto defeated Benfica 6–0 on aggregate. The last meeting between these sides in domestic league action saw a draw between both sides at the Estádio da Luz. The last meeting between these two sides in the domestic cup competition saw Benfica defeat Porto 2–1 in the final of the Taça de Portugal thanks to an extra time goal from Simão.

== Pre-match ==
=== Entry ===
Porto qualified for their second consecutive Supertaça Cândido de Oliveira by winning the 2003–04 Primeira Liga. Along the season, Porto remained in top spot and managed important victories against its rivals to clinch the Primeira Liga title. Porto dominated the whole season managing twenty-three victories from their first twenty-eight league games. Some notable wins during the season saw Porto defeat rivals Sporting CP, 4–1 on matchweek 3, as well as Benfica on matchday 5, 2–0.

Benfica qualified for the Supertaça by winning the 2003–04 Taça de Portugal. Benfica defeated Estrela da Amadora 3–1, Académica de Coimbra 1–0, Nacional 2–1 and Belenenses 3–1 en route to the final. In the final of the Taça de Portugal, Benfica faced Porto at the Estádio Nacional. Benfica defeated Porto 2–1. After Derlei and Takis Fyssas had scored for either side, the game ended one all after ninety minutes. In extra-time, Simão scored in the 104th minute to clinch Benfica's 24th cup triumph.

=== Officials ===
The match officials for the game were confirmed on the 18 August 2004 by the Portuguese Football Federation. Carlos Xistra of Castelo Branco was named as referee. This was Xistra's first Supertaça match that he had officiated. He had primarily been used as a referee since the 2000–01 season where he regularly officiated Primeira Liga games. For the Supertaça, Xistra was assisted by José Ramalho of Porto and Luís Tavares of Portalegre, while the fourth official was Paulo Baptista of Portalegre.

=== Ticketing ===
The Portuguese Football Federation distributed 30,000 tickets for the Supertaça. Tickets went on sale on 18 August. Benfica and Porto received 10,500 tickets each to distribute to their supporters. The remaining tickets were allocated to the Coimbra Football Association, the Lisbon Football Association and the Porto Football Association. The price of the tickets varied between €20 and €40.

=== Venue ===
Initially, the Portuguese Football Federation announced that the Estádio Dr. Magalhães Pessoa in Leiria would play host to the Supertaça. In August 2004, the venue was changed to the Estádio Cidade de Coimbra in Coimbra. The host venue of the Supertaça was changed due to the Leiria Football Association expressing their desire to host a 2006 FIFA World Cup qualification game between Portugal and Estonia which would take place a few weeks after the SuperCup game. This would be the first time that the Estádio Cidade de Coimbra would host a major final of a competition.

The Estádio Cidade de Coimbra is the home stadium of Académica de Coimbra. It holds a seating capacity for 30,210 spectators. Between 2001 and 2003, the stadium underwent renovation as it was selected by the Portuguese Football Federation to be one of the host venues for UEFA Euro 2004. The stadium played host to two group stage matches at the tournament between England and Switzerland, and France and Switzerland.

== Match ==
=== Team selection ===
Benfica went into the 2004 Supertaça Cândido de Oliveira with some key players missing due to injury as well as some being a doubt for the game. Benfica's Takis Fyssas was a doubt for the match due to sustaining an injury in pre-season training. Benfica were without winger Carlitos; he sustained an injury in pre-season training in which he suffered tendinitis in his right knee. Carlitos would remain out of action for one month.

Giovanni Trapattoni's squad selection saw him include Fyssas, who had just recovered from an injury. Trapattoni left out goalkeeper José Moreira who had arrived a few days prior to the Supertaça due to representing Portugal at the 2004 Summer Olympics. Trapattoni would include seven newly acquired players in his squad; Eurípedes Amoreirinha, Azar Karadas, Everson, Manuel dos Santos, Paulo Almeida, Quim and Yannick Quesnel. Of these seven new players to arrive at Benfica, Quim, Dos Santos and Almeida would start the game. Karadas and Everson would later be used in the game as substitutes.

Porto went into the 2004 Supertaça Cândido de Oliveira with several players who were doubtful due to injury as well as players missing due to other commitments. Porto were without striker Derlei, who suffered an injury in the weeks building up to the Supertaça. Derlei contracted a partial rupture of an internal ligament in his right knee and would be out of action for two weeks. Porto's Costinha and Hélder Postiga were injury doubts but fully recuperated for the match. José Bosingwa and Ricardo Costa were also doubts for the game after they had represented the Portuguese Olympic team at the 2004 Summer Olympics a few days prior to the match. Porto's Jorge Costa, Pepe and Maniche were ineligible for the match as they were serving suspensions.

Víctor Fernández's squad selection for the match saw him leave out Bruno Moraes. Fernández would include Bosingwa and Ricardo Costa in the squad despite only returning from representing Portugal in the Olympics. Fernández's squad selection for the Supertaça saw him include seven newly acquired players: Adriano Rossato, Diego, Giourkas Seitaridis, Hélder Postiga, Hugo Leal, Miguel Areias and Ricardo Quaresma. Of those seven, Fernández would select Diego, Seitaridis, Leal and Quaresma to start the game. César Peixoto and Postiga would later be used in the game as substitutes.

=== Summary ===
Benfica took control early in the game, creating several chances in the first ten minutes of the game. The first few chances created by Benfica at the beginning of the game were mainly through interplay between Simão and Zlatko Zahovič. On 21 minutes, Porto's influential midfield talisman Diego sustained an injury which required him to be replaced by César Peixoto. The introduction of Peixoto saw Porto possess more of an attacking threat going forward. This led to Porto's first chance of the game on 29 minutes where Peixoto tested Benfica's Quim from distance. The most clear cut chance of the first half fell to Benfica's Zahovič on 30 minutes. Zahovič combined with Manuel dos Santos, who crossed the ball into the 18-yard box and found an unmarked Zahovič, who could not capitalize after his shot was blocked by a Porto defender for a corner. Benfica, for the remainder of the half, would apply pressure on Porto's defense but was unable to get a breakthrough and score the opening goal of the game.

Benfica began the second half dominating possession just like the first half. On 55 minutes, Benfica lost possession of the ball in the middle of the pitch. Carlos Alberto picked up the ball and threaded the ball to an unmarked Ricardo Quaresma on the left wing who beat Benfica defender Argel and then fired the ball past Quim to give Porto the lead. Despite Porto's lead, Benfica began to create more chances and squandered several chances from set pieces from Luisão and Tomo Šokota. As the game drew to a close, Porto began to get more men behind the ball to protect their lead. Their strategy would pay off as Porto would hold out for the win and consequently capture their 14th Supertaça.

=== Details ===
20 August 2004
21:15 UTC

Benfica	0–1	Porto
		Quaresma 55'

Estádio Cidade de Coimbra, Coimbra
Attendance: 22,023
Referee: Carlos Xistra (Castelo Branco)

Benfica	Porto

GK	12	(Portugal) Quim
RB	23	(Portugal) Miguel
CB	3	(Brazil) Argel
CB	4	(Brazil) Luisão (c)	(yellow card) 42'
LB	18	(France) Manuel dos Santos	(yellow card) 48'
CM	5	(Brazil) Paulo Almeida		(substituted off) 65'
CM	6	(Portugal) Petit	(yellow card) 56'
RM	47	(Portugal) João Pereira		(substituted off) 84'
AM	10	(Slovenia) Zlatko Zahovič	(yellow card) 48'	(substituted off) 59'
LM	20	(Portugal) Simão
CF	25	(Croatia) Tomo Šokota
Substitutes:
GK	24	(France) Yannick Quesnel
DF	2	(Portugal) Eurípedes Amoreirinha
DF	14	(Greece) Takis Fyssas
DF	33	(Portugal) Ricardo Rocha
MF	8	(Portugal) Bruno Aguiar		(substituted on) 65'
MF	19	(Brazil) Everson		(substituted on) 84'
FW	22	(Norway) Azar Karadas		(substituted on) 59'
Manager:
(Italy) Giovanni Trapattoni

GK	99	(Portugal) Vítor Baía (c)
RB	22	(Greece) Giourkas Seitaridis
CB	3	(Portugal) Pedro Emanuel
CB	5	(Portugal) Ricardo Costa
LB	8	(Portugal) Nuno Valente
DM	4	(Portugal) Hugo Leal
CM	6	(Portugal) Costinha	(yellow card) 84'
RM	10	(Portugal) Ricardo Quaresma	(yellow card) 29'	(substituted off) 61'
AM	16	(Brazil) Diego		(substituted off) 21'
LM	19	(Brazil) Carlos Alberto
CF	77	(South Africa) Benni McCarthy		(substituted off) 76'
Substitutes:
GK	13	(Portugal) Nuno
DF	14	(Portugal) Miguel Areias
DF	17	(Portugal) José Bosingwa	(yellow card) 84'	(substituted on) 61'
MF	12	(Portugal) César Peixoto	(yellow card) 42'	(substituted on) 21'
FW	9	(Lithuania) Edgaras Jankauskas
FW	21	(Brazil) Maciel
FW	41	(Portugal) Hélder Postiga		(substituted on) 76'
Manager:
(Spain) Víctor Fernández

2004 Supertaça Cândido de Oliveira Winners
Porto
14th Title

Man of the match

- (Portugal) Ricardo Quaresma (Porto)

Match officials

- Assistant referees:
  - José Ramalho (Porto)
  - Luís Tavares (Portalegre)
- Fourth official: Paulo Baptista (Portalegre)

Match rules

- 90 minutes
- Penalty shoot-out if scores level after 90 minutes
- Seven named substitutes
- Maximum of three substitutions

== See also ==
- O Clássico
- 2004–05 Primeira Liga
- 2004–05 Taça de Portugal
- 2004–05 FC Porto season
- 2004–05 S.L. Benfica season
