= Yannick Quesnel =

French retired footballer (born 1973)

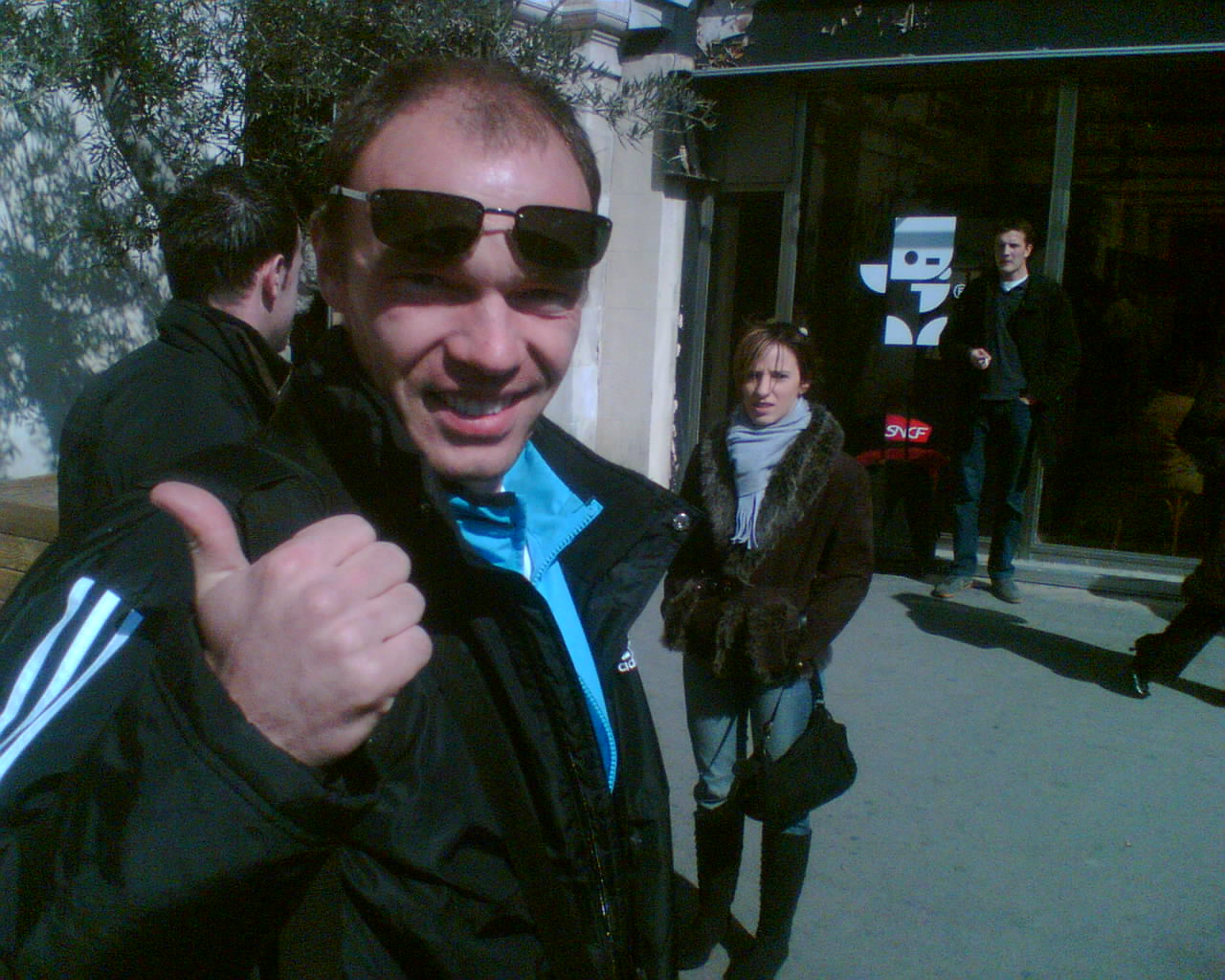

Personal information
- Full name: Yannick Daniel Quesnel
- Date of birth: 24 October 1973 (age 53)
- Place of birth: Libourne, France
- Height: 1.81 m (5 ft 11 in)
- Position: Goalkeeper

Youth career
- Saint Emillion

Senior career*
Years	Team	Apps	(Gls)
1991–1993	Sochaux	0	(0)
1993–1995	Libourne		
1995–1998	Bordeaux	0	(0)
1998–2000	Cannes	49	(0)
2000–2001	Naval	19	(0)
2001–2004	Alverca	94	(0)
2004–2006	Benfica	0	(0)
2005	→ Estoril (loan)	8	(0)
2005–2006	→ Marseille (loan)	0	(0)
2006–2007	Monaco	0	(0)
2007–2009	Pennoise		
2009–2010	Stade Bordelais		
2010–2011	Pennoise		
- * Club domestic league appearances and goals

Yannick Daniel Quesnel (born 24 October 1973) is a French retired footballer who played as a goalkeeper.

Most of his professional career was spent in Portugal, notably playing in two Primeira Liga seasons with Alverca. He also represented Benfica for five months.

== Football career ==
Born in Libourne, Aquitaine, Quesnel's early professional career in his country was highly unsuccessful, as he only managed to appear with FC Sochaux-Montbéliard and FC Girondins de Bordeaux's reserve teams over five seasons combined, eventually moving to Ligue 2 club AS Cannes. In 2000, he began an adventure in Portugal that would last five years, starting with second division's Associação Naval 1º de Maio and signing with F.C. Alverca in the following year.

After stellar performances at Alverca, at the time S.L. Benfica's farm team, which included winning the Goalkeeper of the Year award in 2001–02 even though the former suffered Primeira Liga relegation, Quesnel signed with precisely the latter on a three-year contract. Being only third-choice behind José Moreira and Quim, however, he would spend the next one and a half seasons loaned, one of those back in his country with Olympique de Marseille.

After an unassuming campaign with AS Monaco FC, having already cut ties with Benfica (he did not manage to appear once in the league with both Ligue 1 sides combined), Quesnel played the remainder of his career in French amateur football.

== Honours ==
=== Club ===
Marseille

- UEFA Intertoto Cup: 2005

Benfica

- Supertaça Cândido de Oliveira: Runner-up 2004

=== Individual ===
- Primeira Liga: Goalkeeper of the Year 2002
