= Diego (footballer, born 1985) =

Brazilian footballer

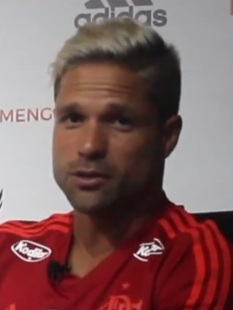
- Diego in 2019

Personal information
- Full name: Diego Ribas da Cunha
- Date of birth: 28 February 1985 (age 41)
- Place of birth: Ribeirão Preto, Brazil
- Height: 1.73 m (5 ft 8 in)
- Position: Attacking midfielder

Youth career
- 1996–2001: Santos

Senior career*
| Years | Team | Apps | (Gls) |
| 2002–2004 | Santos | 86 | (24) |
| 2004–2006 | Porto | 48 | (4) |
| 2006–2009 | Werder Bremen | 84 | (38) |
| 2009–2010 | Juventus | 33 | (5) |
| 2010–2014 | VfL Wolfsburg | 77 | (19) |
| 2011–2012 | → Atlético Madrid (loan) | 30 | (3) |
| 2014 | Atlético Madrid | 13 | (1) |
| 2014–2016 | Fenerbahçe | 53 | (5) |
| 2016–2022 | Flamengo | 204 | (37) |
| Total | | 627 | (136) |

International career
| 2001 | Brazil U17 | 3 | (0) |
| 2004–2008 | Brazil U23 | 15 | (7) |
| 2003–2017 | Brazil | 34 | (4) |
Medal record
Men's Football
Representing Brazil
Copa América
| Winner | 2004 Peru |
| Winner | 2007 Venezuela |
CONCACAF Gold Cup
| Runner-up | 2003 Mexico–United States |
Olympic Games
| Bronze medal – third place | 2008 Beijing | Team competition |
- * Club domestic league appearances and goals

Diego Ribas da Cunha (born 28 February 1985), commonly known as just Diego or Diego Ribas, is a Brazilian former professional footballer who played as an attacking midfielder. A full international for Brazil since 2003, Diego earned 34 caps and scored four international goals. He was part of the Brazilian squads which finished as runners-up at the 2003 CONCACAF Gold Cup, won the Copa América in 2004 and 2007, and earned a bronze medal at the 2008 Olympics.

Diego began his career at Santos, where he won two Campeonato Brasileiro Série A titles before moving to Porto in 2004. Despite winning further trophies in Portugal, his personal form dropped. After two seasons, he moved for €6 million to Werder Bremen where his form improved, winning domestic honours and helping them to the 2009 UEFA Cup Final. He also won honours at Atlético Madrid, including the UEFA Europa League in 2012. From 2016 to 2022, he played for Brazilian club Flamengo, with whom he won the Copa Libertadores among other domestic and international honours.

== Club career ==
=== Santos ===
At age six, Diego started to show his talent when training with Comercial FC in Ribeirão Preto. After joining another team, São Carlos, when he was nine, Diego decided to take trials in the hope of impressing a bigger club. Diego was first signed by the São Paulo team Santos at the age of 12. He developed while in the Santos youth system, making his first team debut at the age of 16 in the Rio-São Paulo Championship in 2002 and in the same year won the domestic Campeonato Brasileiro championship. He, Robinho, Elano and Alex were known as a famous group when they played for Santos.

=== Porto ===
Diego was then signed by Primeira Liga club Porto in July 2004 as a replacement and the potential successor for Deco, but he could not produce the same calibre of performances as he did at Santos. Diego made his debut for Porto in a 1–1 draw against União de Leiria on 22 August and on 30 October, he scored his first goal for Porto in a 2–2 draw against Nacional. As Porto triumphed in the Intercontinental Cup against Once Caldas via a penalty shootout, Diego was sent off for swearing at goalkeeper Juan Carlos Henao after scoring his effort. Journalist Tim Vickery ascribed this action to Diego's experiences against the team in the previous season's Copa Libertadores, in which the physical Colombian side eliminated Santos in the quarter-finals. In his first season at Porto, Diego made 30 appearances, scoring two goals against Sporting CP and Braga. In 2005–06, however, he did not maintain a stable place in the Porto team under coach Co Adriaanse and also found life difficult at Porto. He eventually left the club to sign with Werder Bremen.

=== Werder Bremen ===
==== 2006–07 season ====
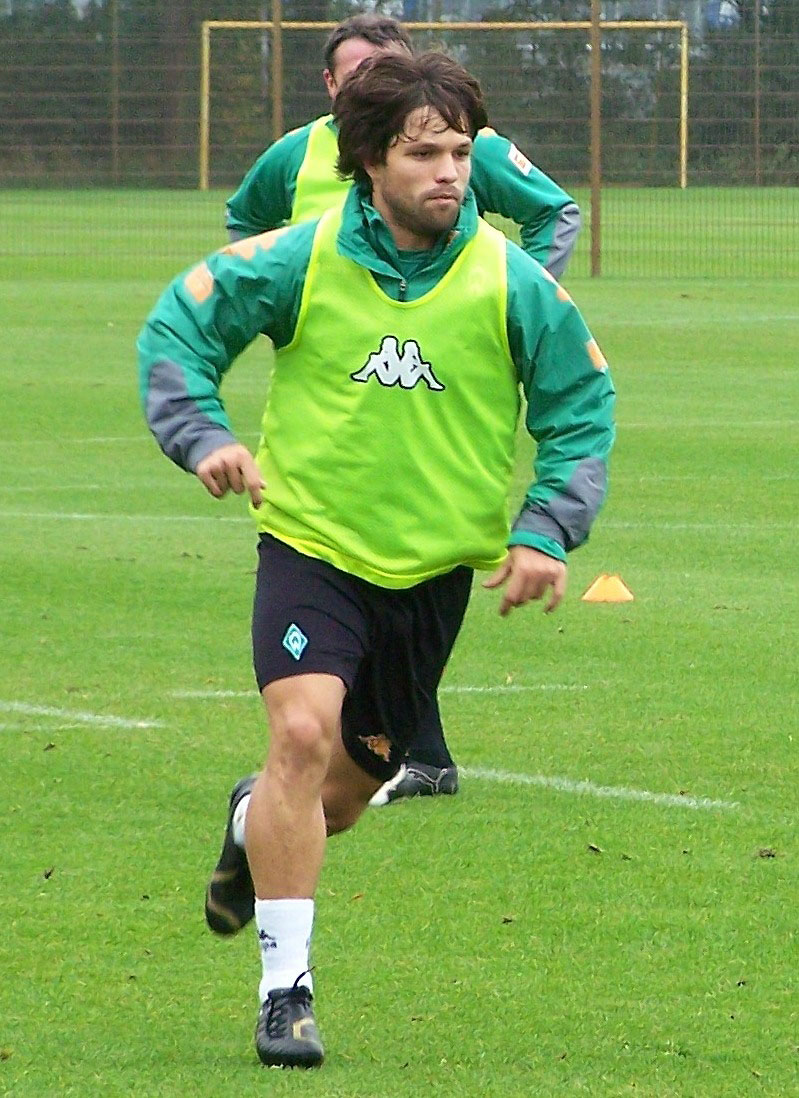
Diego training with Werder Bremen in 2006

In May 2006, Diego signed a contract with German Bundesliga side Werder Bremen until 2010 for a transfer fee of €6 million. His first match for Bremen came in the DFB-Ligapokal. Werder Bremen won the cup, beating Bayern Munich in the final on 5 August. The 2006–07 Bundesliga season began well for Diego. He scored the first goal and set up two more for Bremen in their 4–2 win over Hannover 96, on 13 August. In his second match in the Bundesliga, he set up both goals in the 2–1 win over Bayer Leverkusen.

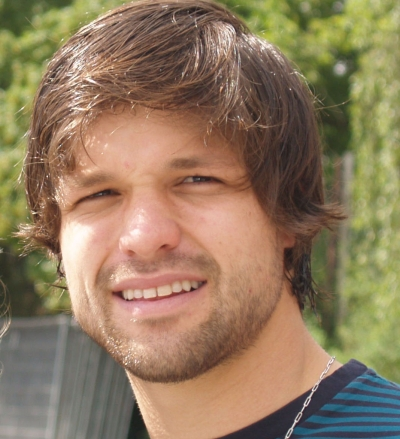
Diego in 2007

Thanks to his good performances in August, both in the Bundesliga and in the Ligapokal, Diego won the August Player of the Month award. As the Bundesliga season progressed, Diego made several amazing performances and became one of the most valuable players for Bremen, along with his teammate Torsten Frings. Together, they were called the "two motors of Bremen's midfield". In October 2006, he won a second Player of the Month award, as well as again in December 2006. He was then named as the Best Player of the first half of the Bundesliga season.

Werder Bremen finished in third place in Group A in the Champions League group stages, and they moved to the UEFA Cup, where they reached the semi-finals after beating AZ in the quarter-finals due in part to Diego's creative play. On 15 April, Diego again played well, scoring in the 2–0 win over Borussia Dortmund. Five days later, on 20 April, Bremen played against Alemannia Aachen. Although Diego's performance was good, he did not score until stoppage time when he scored from 62.5 metres, which later was elected as goal of the year. Bremen won the game 3–1 and topped the table with 60 points.

Following his good performances in the first half of the Bundesliga, Diego got called up to the Brazil national team in November. After the 2006–07 season ended, Diego won the Bundesliga Player of the Season award organised by popular magazine kicker. He received just over 50 percent of the votes. Unfortunately, his team did not win the Bundesliga after finishing third in the table, behind champions VfB Stuttgart and Schalke 04.

==== 2007–08 season ====
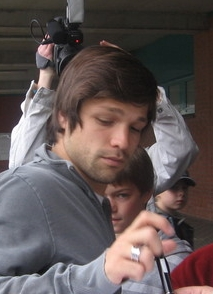
Diego signing autographs in 2007

Diego started his season well, scoring a penalty on the first matchday. Diego gave many outstanding performances. He was crucial as Bremen progressed to the 2007–08 Champions League group stage. They beat Croatian club Dinamo Zagreb 3–2 in Zagreb, with Diego scoring two penalties. On the first Champions League group stage matchday, Bremen lost 2–1 to Real Madrid, but Diego's performance aroused interest in Real Madrid's coach Bernd Schuster. Rumours of his departure, however, were put to an end when Diego signed a new contract which would last until 2011.

After the loss to Real Madrid, Bremen faced VfB Stuttgart, the defending German champions, at home. Werder won 4–1, with Diego leading the midfield. Later on in the season, Bremen achieved a historical 8–1 win over Arminia Bielefeld, with Diego assisting three goals and scoring one himself. Diego was voted Player of the Month in September. He then scored two goals en route to the UEFA Cup round of 16 with Bremen, where they lost to Rangers.

==== 2008–09 season ====
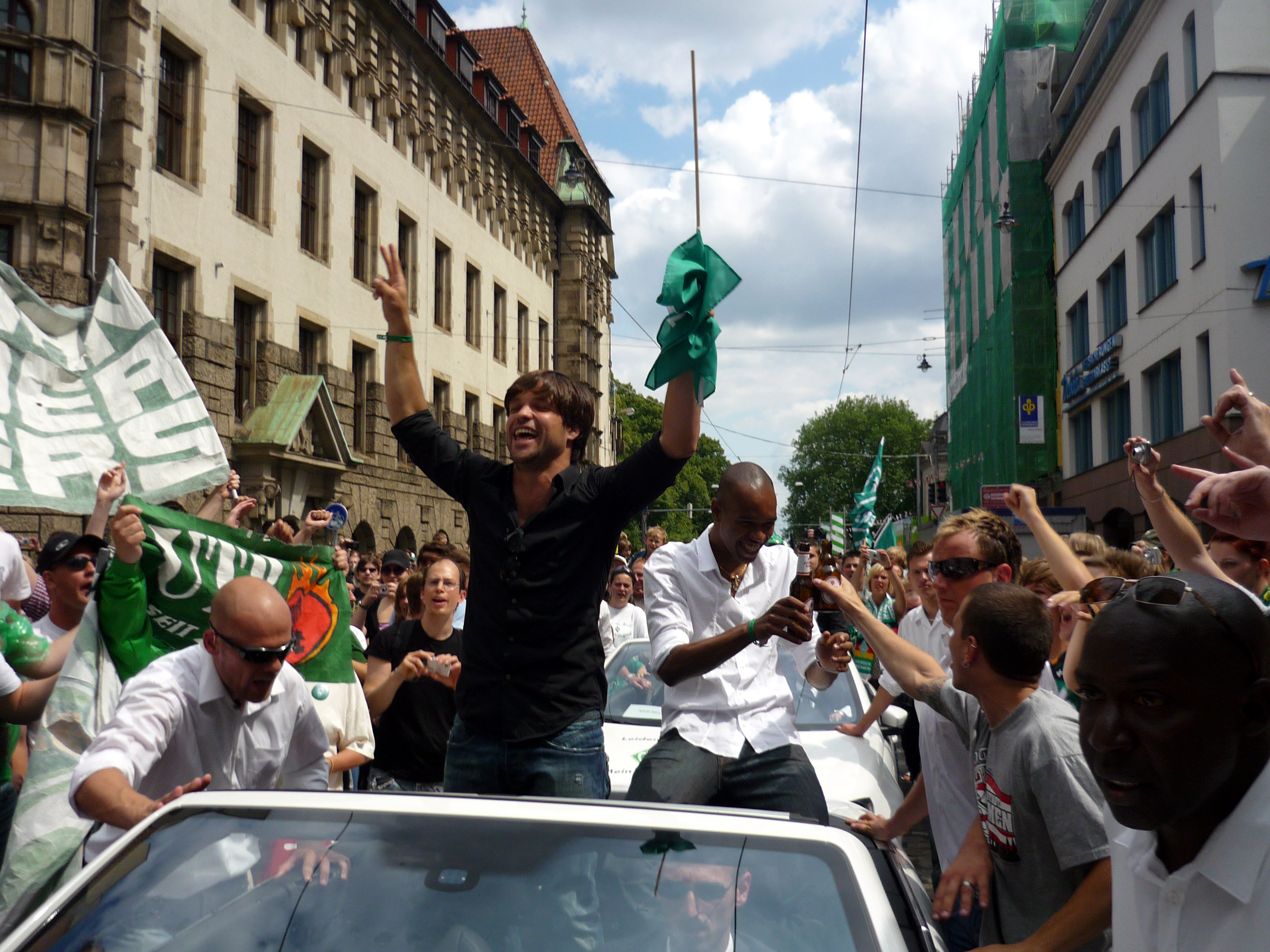
Diego celebrating the 2009 DFB-Pokal title alongside teammate Naldo

Diego's last season with Bremen was his most successful. He scored 20 goals in total (more than his two first seasons in the club), although Bremen did finish just tenth in the 2008–09 Bundesliga and were knocked out of the Champions League at the group stage after finishing third in their group. In the UEFA Cup that season, Diego scored six goals, all in the knockout stages. He also scored against Milan in the round of 32, equalizing after 84 minutes, and assisting Claudio Pizarro in the second leg's only goal. He helped his team through the round of 16, and scored four of the six goals, and managed one assist in the quarter-final knockout of Udinese.

In the semi-finals, after losing 1–0 in their hometown to "North Derby" rivals Hamburger SV, Diego helped his team back in the second leg with an early equalizer to Ivica Olić's early critical goal. Later on that game, he assisted a corner to Frank Baumann's third Bremen goal. In that game, Diego received an unfortunate yellow card, preventing him from playing in the final, and with a 3–2 away win, he ended his UEFA Cup participation, leading Bremen to their first UEFA Cup final ever. Without Diego in the 2009 UEFA Cup Final, Bremen lost the game 2–1 in extra time to Ukrainian team Shakhtar Donetsk. In his last match with Bremen, Diego gave the assist to Mesut Özil's winning goal against Bayer Leverkusen in the DFB-Pokal final to secure Bremen's sixth title in the competition.

=== Juventus ===
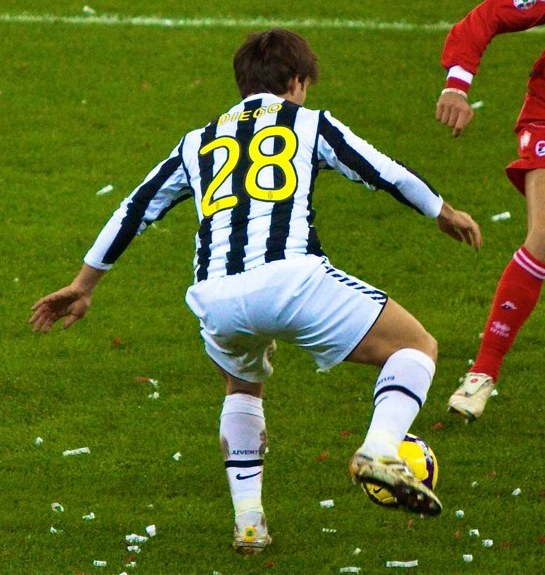
Diego playing for Juventus in 2009

On 26 May 2009, Diego signed a five-year contract to join Juventus of Serie A at the end of the season 2008–09 season. The fee paid to Bremen by Juventus was worth €24.5 million, though the price can rise by a further €2.5 million in case of the fulfillment of established sports objectives in the next five years. Diego made his Juventus debut against the Korean side Seongnam, a game they won 3–0. In the first half, Diego made the pass to Mauro Camoranesi, whose pass followed up to a goal. Diego then scored in the second half and was subbed out at the 60th minute. On his Serie A debut, he assisted Vincenzo Iaquinta's goal from a set-piece. In the second fixture of the campaign, Diego recorded his first Serie A goal, scoring twice in Juventus' 3–1 victory against Roma on 30 August 2009. He also scored goals against Bologna, Fiorentina and Napoli. One of his most noted assists was his backheel to Alessandro Del Piero's goal against Genoa. He has also scored in the 2010 TIM Trophy against Milan.

Diego's swaggering displays he produced during his time in Bremen were met with anger and confusion from Juventus fans; the formation did not suit him and he had a fall-out with then coach Ciro Ferrara. Juventus announced Diego would leave Juventus despite pleading to stay at the club. German clubs like VfL Wolfsburg, Bayern Munich and his former club Werder Bremen were linked to sign him; however, Bremen ruled out signing him due to sporting director Klaus Allofs believing a deal to bring him back to Bremen would be "economically impossible", and Diego reiterated his desire to stay.

=== VfL Wolfsburg ===
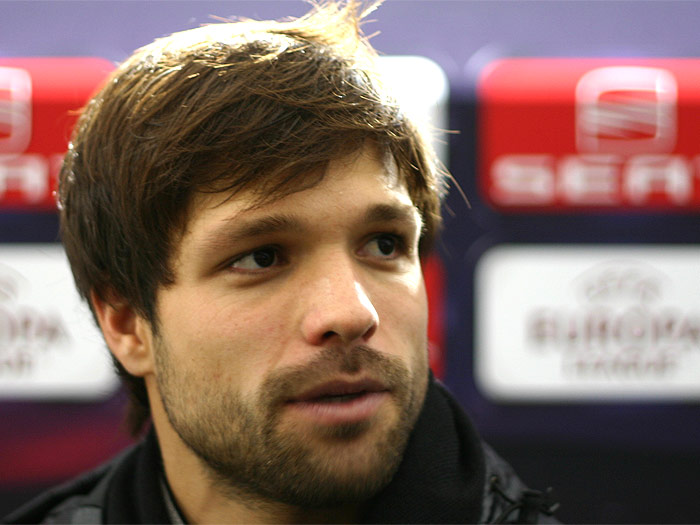
Diego in 2010

Eventually, on 27 August 2010, Diego moved from Juventus to VfL Wolfsburg for a club record transfer fee of €15.5 million, of which Juve would only receive €14.75 million as 5% of the transfer fee transferred to his youth clubs as solidarity contribution. Following his move to Wolfsburg, Diego criticized Juventus general director Giuseppe Marotta for his exit and is the blame for letting Juventus make huge losses on some high-profile players.

In Diego's first match for Wolfsburg, he scored his debut goal in a game which Wolfsburg lost 3–4 to Mainz 05. On 5 February 2011, he won a penalty for Wolfsburg; he subsequently took the ball from designated spot-kick taker Patrick Helmes, then hit the woodwork ten minutes from time. Wolfsburg later lost the match by one goal, prompting Wolfsburg manager Steve McClaren to fine him €100,000 (£86,000) for failing to follow instructions. Diego was defended by Dieter Hoeneß, claiming that Diego does not believe he should be banned for the incident. Nonetheless, Diego was also informed that he would be removed from the first team for Wolfsburg's upcoming game against Hamburger SV.

On 14 May, before a crucial relegation game against 1899 Hoffenheim, Diego once again got in trouble with the management of Wolfsburg, when he left the hotel in which the team was staying when he was informed he would not be starting the game. This left Wolfsburg with only six players on the bench for the game that would determine whether they would play another season in the Bundesliga or be relegated. Wolfsburg went on to win the game 3–1 without Diego, ensuring another top flight season for the club, though Diego was fined €500,000 for his actions.

==== Loan to Atlético Madrid ====
After the 2010–11 season at Wolfsburg, new manager Felix Magath told Diego in May he had no future with the club. On the last day of the transfer season, Diego joined Atlético Madrid in La Liga on a season-long loan. On 10 September 2011, he made his debut for Atlético against Valencia. He scored his first goal for Atlético in the 60th minute of a UEFA Europa League game against Celtic to make it 2–0 and made an assist to Radamel Falcao in the third minute. The match finished in a 2–0 win for Atlético. Diego scored his first league goal in a 3–2 win over Levante on 20 November 2011. As a key player for Atlético, Diego provided assists and established himself in the first team. But on 19 February 2012, against Sporting de Gijón, Diego sustained a hamstring injury in the second half. It was announced that Diego would be out for a month. After a month out, Diego recovered from his injury and made his return to training. Diego made his return against Real Zaragoza on 26 March 2012.

On 9 May 2012, Diego scored the third goal on Atlético's win over Athletic Bilbao in the Europa League Final, assuring the capital side won the title for the second time in three years. After the match, Diego told UEFA's official website, "We played against a tough rival like Athletic, but we played an almost perfect match, it was a difficult match, we never said it was going to be easy. I have to thank God for this [victory]." Atlético teammate Juanfran revealed that Diego wanted to stay at Madrid rather than go back to Germany, but confessed that it would be tough for the club to buy him outright. Diego admitted that his time with Atlético has been "magical", stating that his time in Spain was more than what he could have hoped for: "This season was positive on both an individual and collective level and I'm delighted." and made a farewell message to the club's fans, telling them about the club will be part of his life. Seven months on, Diego revealed he was unaware over a permanent move to Atlético, as the move never transpired.

==== Return to VfL Wolfsburg ====
Diego returned to VfL Wolfsburg following the end of his loan spell in Madrid. Upon his return, his relationship with manager Felix Magath continued to deteriorate: he was placed in the reserve side after Magath criticised his attitude on his first training session back. Despite the strained relationship between the two, he was selected by Magath in a series of pre-season friendlies in a tour of China. Although he was told by Magath he has no future in Wolfsburg, Diego nonetheless announced that he would stay at the club, as clubs overseas had no apparent interest in signing him.

Diego played his first game for the club in a 1–0 victory over VfB Stuttgart in the opening game of the 2012–13 Bundesliga. In the club's first game without Magath, who had been sacked with only five points in eight matches (and no goals and points in the last four games), Diego scored his first goal and provided his first assist of the Bundesliga season in Wolfsburg's 4–1 defeat of Fortuna Düsseldorf on 27 October 2012, which ended a run of four-straight defeats. Following the match, Diego stated that the club are enjoying their football again and he had given a chance under new interim manager Lorenz-Günther Köstner. Four days later, in the DFB-Pokal, Diego opened the scoring before providing an assist for Bas Dost as Wolfsburg defeated FSV Frankfurt 2–0. He then netted a brace in Wolfsburg's 3–1 victory over Bayer Leverkusen on 11 November, bringing to an end Bayer's 11-game unbeaten run and giving Wolfsburg their first home win of the Bundesliga campaign. Then, on 8 December 2012, Diego scored and set up the second and third goal in match in a 3–2 win over Borussia Dortmund.

Throughout the 2012–13 season, Diego continued to make an impressive display for the club, scoring 10 goals in 37 appearances in all competitions, making him the club's top-scorer. Before and during the 2013–14 Bundesliga season, Diego was linked with a move back to Santos in Brazil, as well as with English Premier League side Arsenal. Despite the rumours, Diego stayed with Wolfsburg for the first half of the season, scoring 3 times in 15 appearances. Throughout the first half of the season, however, Diego's future at Wolfsburg was uncertain after he disagreed with sporting director Klaus Allofs. At this time, Diego earned the highest wages at the club. The club was keen to extend Diego's contract.

=== Atlético Madrid ===
On 31 January 2014, Diego moved back from Wolfsburg to Atlético Madrid. He signed a contract for the rest of the 2013–14 season. Prior the move, Diego desired to leave Wolfsburg in order to play in the Champions League. Diego debuted on 2 February on Atlético's victory 4–0 against Real Sociedad, scoring the match's fourth and final goal. On 1 April, Diego scored from a long-range shot against Barcelona in the Champions League, as Atlético reached the semi-finals for the first time since 1974. Atlético would reach the final of the Champions League for the second time since 1974, after beating Chelsea 3–1 to face their rivals Real Madrid in their first ever Madrid derby in the Champions League final. Diego was an unused substitute in the final as Atlético Madrid lost 4–1. Nevertheless, Diego helped the club win the La Liga championship to earn his team its first league title in 18 years. After being linked a move away, Diego wrote on his Instagram account, giving the Atlético supporters a farewell message, as he left the club for the second time.

=== Fenerbahçe ===
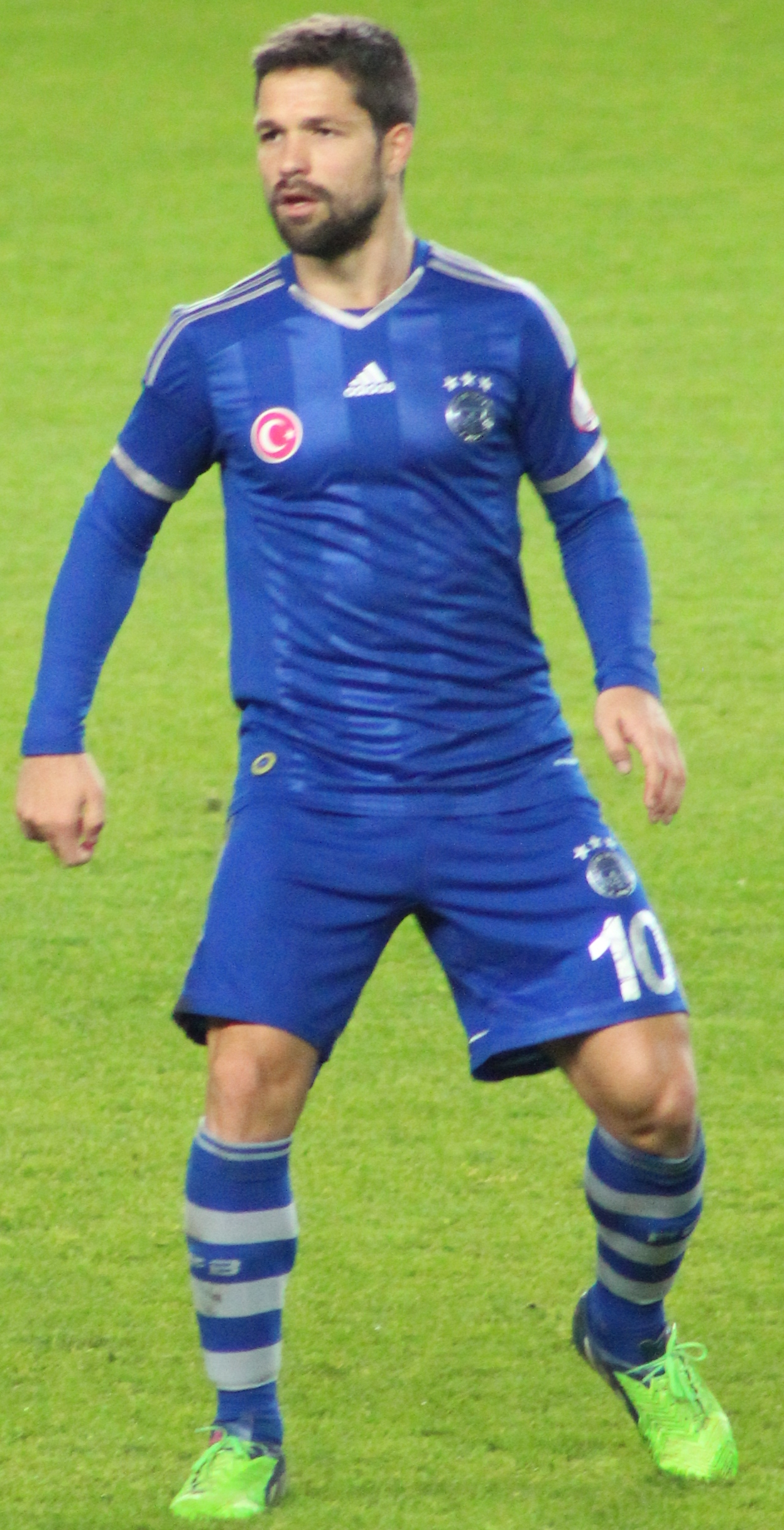
Diego playing for Fenerbahçe in 2014

Upon his contract with Wolfsburg expiring at the end of the 2013–14 season, Diego was linked with a move to both Arsenal and Turkish Süper Lig side Fenerbahçe, and on 11 July 2014, Fenerbahçe confirmed a three-year deal after a medical. The next day, Diego was presented with the number 10 shirt. Diego made his Fenerbahçe debut in the opening game of the season, coming on as a substitute for Emmanuel Emenike in the 62nd minute, in a 3–2 win over Karabükspor. Diego continued to be in the first team by the first half of the season until he suffered a partial muscle tear during a 1–1 draw against Bursaspor on 24 November 2014. After being on the sidelines for three weeks, Diego made his first team return against Altınordu in the Groupstage of Turkish Cup, which he scored in a 1–1 draw on 23 December 2014.

On 24 January 2015, Diego played a vital role when he provided two assist for Dirk Kuyt and Caner Erkin in a 3–0 win over Kasımpaşa on 24 January 2015. Diego's second goal then came four months later on 3 April 2015 in the quarter-final of Turkish Cup in a 2–1 win over Mersin İdmanyurdu. Soon after, Diego soon made complaint, claiming he had not been paid by the club. Diego scored his first league goal for the club in a 4–3 win over Balıkesirspor on 2 May 2015 after making his first team from the previous game as a substitute. This was followed up his second league goal seven days later, in a 3–2 win over Sivasspor. Diego's third goal later came in a 2–2 draw against İstanbul Başakşehir. In his first season at Fenerbahçe, Diego made 30 appearances and scored five goals in all competitions.

=== Flamengo ===
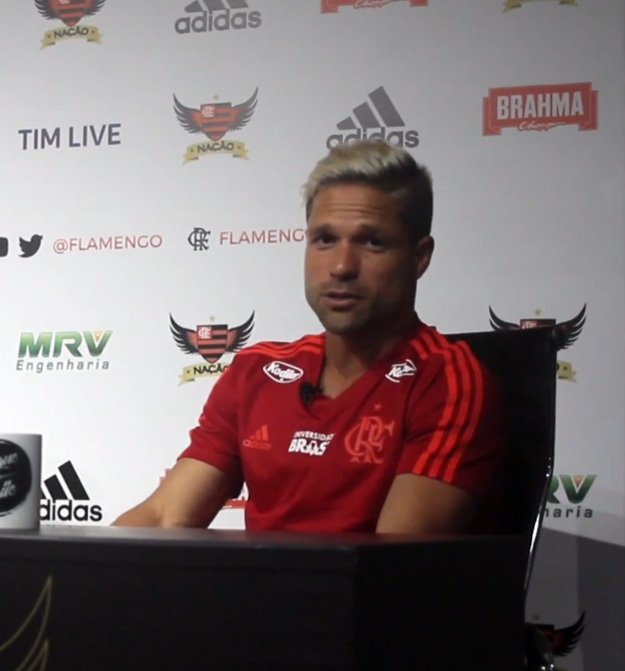
Diego in 2019

After various failed attempts to sign Diego in previous years, Flamengo was finally able to hire the player for three years on 19 July 2016. The player, who had already expressed a wish of playing for a Brazilian club chose Flamengo over other rival clubs. The great moment lived by Rubro-Negro, in the Brazilian Série A, according to Diego, resulted from "complicity and generosity." Diego made an instant impact in Flamengo and quickly became the team's most important midfielder. He debuted on 21 August 2016 in a Brazilian Série A match against Grêmio scoring the winning goal with a header. He went on to score another goal in the next match, this time in a 3–1 win over Chapecoense on 28 August 2016.

In the 2019 Copa Libertadores Final on 23 November 2019, Diego came off the bench and helped set up both of Gabriel Barbosa's goals as Flamengo came back from a goal down to defeat River Plate 2–1. Diego captained the side in the first leg of the 2020 Recopa Sudamericana on 19 February 2020. The match ended in a 2–2 draw with Copa Sudamericana winners Independiente del Valle of Ecuador. Flamengo won the second leg 3–0 to secure a 5–2 aggregate victory and claim their first Recopa Sudamericana title. On 26 August 2020, Diego signed a one-year extension with Flamengo.

=== Retirement ===
On 12 November 2022, he ended his career at the age of 37.

== International career ==
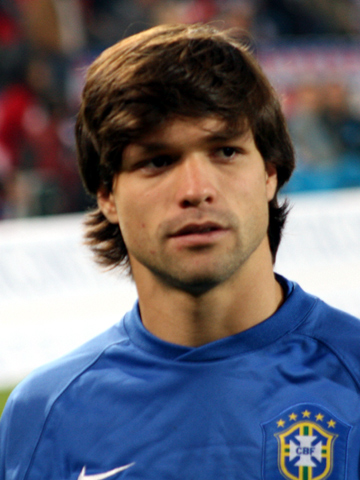
Diego with the Brazil national team in 2006

Diego made his international debut in April 2003 in a friendly match against Mexico. He was later included in Brazil under-23 team that competed in 2003 CONCACAF Gold Cup alongside Santos' teammate Robinho. Although Brazil compete as an under-23 team, the international appearances and goals were recorded as FIFA acknowledge the tournament as senior team matches. He appeared five times and scored two goals as Brazil U-23 lost out to the Mexico senior team in the final. In 2004, Diego was called up for the Brazil national squad for the 2004 Copa América, and he was instrumental in securing the tournament victory for Brazil when he scored in the penalty shootout against Argentina in the final.

Due to his decline in performance with Porto between 2004 and 2006, Diego was often left out of the Brazil squad. He was mostly playing as deputy to Kaká and was also left out of the Brazil squad for the 2006 World Cup. He was then included in Brazil's squad for the 2007 Copa América, which Brazil went on to win, once again defeating Argentina in the final. Before the 2008 Summer Olympics, he was involved in squad controversy. Specifically, Werder Bremen (to send Diego) along with Schalke 04 (Rafinha), both to Brazil, and Barcelona (Lionel Messi) to Argentina, did not want to release their players for the Olympic games so that they could help them in their domestic and European competitions. The case was taken to FIFA, which ruled that all clubs should release their players aged under 23 for the Games.

Schalke, Werder Bremen, and Barcelona took their case to the Court of Arbitration for Sport (CAS) who eventually ruled in the clubs' favour, stating, "The Court of Arbitration for Sport (CAS) has upheld the appeals filed by FC Schalke 04, SV Werder Bremen and FC Barcelona against the decision issued on 30 July 2008 by the Single Judge of the FIFA's Players' Status Committee that consequently has been set aside in its entirety because the Olympics is not on the FIFA's International Calendar to avoid competing with the World Cup." Despite his club's wishes, he ultimately did compete for the Brazil squad under the provision that their salaries were paid for by the Brazilian Football Confederation, which won bronze. On 19 January 2017, he came back to Brazilian team being called up by coach Tite for a friendly game against Colombia, six days later. Only footballers playing for Brazilian clubs were called up. Brazil won the game 1–0.

== Style of play ==
Diego was a creative offensive playmaker known for his technique, dribbling ability, vision and accurate passing; usually deployed as an attacking midfielder, he was also capable of playing as a supporting forward or on the wing on occasion. As well as being an effective assist provider, he was also known for his goalscoring ability, and he was an accurate set-piece taker. Diego was also known for his trickery and ball-skills, such as his use of back-heels, feints and overhead kicks, among an assortment of other tricks.

== Personal life ==
Diego is of Italian ancestry, with both of his paternal great-grandparents emigrating from Italy to Brazil. His great-grandfather, Carlo Lazzari, came from Ferrara, and his great-grandmother, Maria Concetta Viola, came from Naples. As a result of his Italian ancestry, Diego received his Italian passport in 2004. Diego is married to Bruna Letícia Araújo, the couple have three children; two sons Davi (born in 2011) Matteo (born in 2013) and a daughter Letícia (born in 2021).

== Career statistics ==
=== Club ===
Appearances and goals by club, season and competition
| Club | Season | League | | | State league (Note: Includes Campeonato Paulista, Campeonato Carioca) | | National cup (Note: Includes Copa do Brasil, Taça de Portugal, DFB-Pokal, Coppa Italia, Copa del Rey, Turkish Cup) | | Continental | | Other | | Total | |
| Club | Season | Division | Apps | Goals | Apps | Goals | Apps | Goals | Apps | Goals | Apps | Goals | Apps | Goals |
|---|---|---|---|---|---|---|---|---|---|---|---|---|---|---|
| Santos | 2002 | Série A | 28 | 10 | — | | 3 | 1 | — | | 11 (Note: Appearances in Torneio Rio – São Paulo) | 2 | 42 | 13 |
| Santos | 2003 | Série A | 33 | 9 | 6 | 1 | — | | 18 (Note: Fourteen appearances and four appearances in Copa Libertadores, four appearances in Copa Sudamericana) | 4 | — | | 57 | 14 |
| Santos | 2004 | Série A | 9 | 4 | 10 | 0 | — | | 9 (Note: Appearances in Copa Libertadores) | 4 | — | | 28 | 8 |
| Santos | Total | | 70 | 23 | 16 | 1 | 3 | 1 | 27 | 8 | 11 | 2 | 127 | 35 |
| Porto | 2004–05 | Primeira Liga | 30 | 3 | — | | 1 | 0 | 6 (Note: Appearances in UEFA Champions League) | 1 | 2 | 0 | 39 | 4 |
| Porto | 2005–06 | Primeira Liga | 18 | 1 | — | | 2 | 1 | 4 | 1 | — | | 24 | 3 |
| Porto | Total | | 48 | 4 | — | | 3 | 1 | 10 | 2 | 2 | 0 | 63 | 7 |
| Werder Bremen | 2006–07 | Bundesliga | 33 | 13 | — | | 3 | 0 | 14 | 2 | — | | 50 | 15 |
| Werder Bremen | 2007–08 | Bundesliga | 30 | 13 | — | | 3 | 1 | 10 (Note: Three appearances and one goal in UEFA Champions League, seven appearances and three goals in UEFA Europa League) | 4 | — | | 43 | 18 |
| Werder Bremen | 2008–09 | Bundesliga | 21 | 12 | — | | 5 | 2 | 13 (Note: Five appearances and one goal in UEFA Champions League, eight appearances and six goals in UEFA Europa League) | 7 | — | | 39 | 21 |
| Werder Bremen | Total | | 84 | 38 | — | | 11 | 3 | 37 | 13 | — | | 132 | 54 |
| Juventus | 2009–10 | Serie A | 33 | 5 | — | | 2 | 2 | 9 (Note: Five appearances in UEFA Champions League, four appearances in UEFA Europa League) | 0 | — | | 44 | 7 |
| Juventus | 2010–11 | Serie A | 0 | 0 | — | | 0 | 0 | 3 (Note: Appearances in UEFA Europa League) | 0 | — | | 3 | 0 |
| Juventus | Total | | 33 | 5 | — | | 2 | 2 | 12 | 0 | — | | 47 | 7 |
| VfL Wolfsburg | 2010–11 | Bundesliga | 30 | 6 | — | | 2 | 0 | — | | — | | 32 | 6 |
| VfL Wolfsburg | 2012–13 | Bundesliga | 32 | 10 | — | | 5 | 3 | — | | — | | 37 | 13 |
| VfL Wolfsburg | 2013–14 | Bundesliga | 15 | 3 | — | | 3 | 2 | — | | — | | 18 | 5 |
| VfL Wolfsburg | Total | | 77 | 19 | — | | 10 | 5 | — | | — | | 87 | 24 |
| Atlético Madrid (loan) | 2011–12 | La Liga | 30 | 3 | — | | 1 | 0 | 12 | 3 | — | | 43 | 6 |
| Atlético Madrid | 2013–14 | La Liga | 13 | 1 | — | | 2 | 0 | 4 | 1 | — | | 19 | 2 |
| Fenerbahçe | 2014–15 | Süper Lig | 25 | 3 | — | | 5 | 2 | — | | — | | 30 | 5 |
| Fenerbahçe | 2015–16 | Süper Lig | 28 | 2 | — | | 7 | 1 | 10 (Note: Two appearances in UEFA Champions League, eight appearances in UEFA Europa League) | 0 | — | | 45 | 3 |
| Fenerbahçe | Total | | 53 | 5 | — | | 12 | 3 | 10 | 0 | — | | 75 | 8 |
| Flamengo | 2016 | Série A | 17 | 6 | — | | 0 | 0 | 1 (Note: Appearance in Copa Sudamericana) | 0 | — | | 18 | 6 |
| Flamengo | 2017 | Série A | 27 | 10 | 8 | 4 | 6 | 1 | 11 (Note: Three appearances and two goals in Copa Libertadores, eight appearances and one goal in Copa Sudamericana) | 3 | 1 (Note: Appearance in Primeira Liga) | 0 | 53 | 18 |
| Flamengo | 2018 | Série A | 26 | 6 | 9 | 2 | 2 | 0 | 7 | 0 | — | | 44 | 8 |
| Flamengo | 2019 | Série A | 16 | 1 | 12 | 3 | 4 | 0 | 9 | 1 | 2 (Note: Appearances in FIFA Club World Cup) | 0 | 43 | 5 |
| Flamengo | 2020 | Série A | 26 | 1 | 13 | 1 | 0 | 0 | 6 | 0 | 2 (Note: One appearance in Recopa Sudamericana, one appearance in Supercopa do Brasil) | 0 | 47 | 2 |
| Flamengo | 2021 | Série A | 19 | 0 | 7 | 1 | 6 | 0 | 9 | 0 | 1 (Note: Appearance in Supercopa do Brasil) | 0 | 42 | 1 |
| Flamengo | 2022 | Série A | 19 | 1 | 5 | 1 | 5 | 0 | 6 | 0 | 1 | 0 | 36 | 2 |
| Flamengo | Total | | 150 | 25 | 54 | 12 | 23 | 1 | 49 | 4 | 7 | 0 | 283 | 42 |
| Career total | | | 555 | 123 | 70 | 13 | 67 | 16 | 161 | 31 | 20 | 2 | 873 | 185 |

=== International ===
Appearances and goals by national team and year
| National team | Year | Apps | Goals |
|---|---|---|---|
| Brazil | 2003 | 7 | 2 |
| Brazil | 2004 | 5 | 0 |
| Brazil | 2005 | 0 | 0 |
| Brazil | 2006 | 1 | 0 |
| Brazil | 2007 | 12 | 1 |
| Brazil | 2008 | 8 | 1 |
| Brazil | 2009 | 0 | 0 |
| Brazil | 2010 | 0 | 0 |
| Brazil | 2011 | 0 | 0 |
| Brazil | 2012 | 0 | 0 |
| Brazil | 2013 | 0 | 0 |
| Brazil | 2014 | 0 | 0 |
| Brazil | 2015 | 0 | 0 |
| Brazil | 2016 | 0 | 0 |
| Brazil | 2017 | 1 | 0 |
| Total | | 34 | 4 |

Scores and results list Brazil's goal tally first, score column indicates score after each Diego goal.

List of international goals scored by Diego
| No. | Date | Venue | Opponent | Score | Result | Competition | Ref. |
|---|---|---|---|---|---|---|---|
| 1 | 15 July 2003 | Estadio Azteca, Mexico City, Mexico | Honduras | 2–0 | 2–1 | 2003 CONCACAF Gold Cup | |
| 2 | 23 July 2003 | Miami Orange Bowl, Miami, United States | United States | 2–1 | 2–1 | 2003 CONCACAF Gold Cup | |
| 3 | 1 June 2007 | Wembley Stadium, London, England | England | 1–1 | 1–1 | Friendly | |
| 4 | 31 May 2008 | Qwest Field, Seattle, United States | Canada | 1–0 | 3–2 | Friendly | |

== Honours ==
Santos

- Campeonato Brasileiro Série A: 2002

Porto

- Primeira Liga: 2005–06
- Supertaça Cândido de Oliveira: 2004
- Intercontinental Cup: 2004

Werder Bremen

- DFB-Pokal: 2008–09
- DFB-Ligapokal: 2006

Atlético Madrid

- La Liga: 2013–14
- UEFA Europa League: 2011–12

Flamengo

- Campeonato Brasileiro Série A: 2019, 2020
- Copa do Brasil: 2022
- Supercopa do Brasil: 2020, 2021
- Copa Libertadores: 2019, 2022
- Recopa Sudamericana: 2020
- Campeonato Carioca: 2017, 2019, 2020, 2021

Brazil U23

- Olympic Bronze Medalist: 2008

Brazil

- Copa América: 2004, 2007

Individual

- Goal of the Year (Germany): 2007
- VDV Bundesliga Player of the Season: 2006–07
- kicker Bundesliga Team of the Season: 2006–07, 2007–08
- Bundesliga top assist provider: 2007–08
- UEFA Europa League top assist provider: 2011–12
- Campeonato Brasileiro Série A Team of the Year: 2016
- Campeonato Carioca Team of the Year: 2017
- Copa do Brasil Best Player: 2017
- CONCACAF Gold Cup Best XI (Reserves): 2003
