= Ricardo Quaresma =

Portuguese footballer (born 1983)

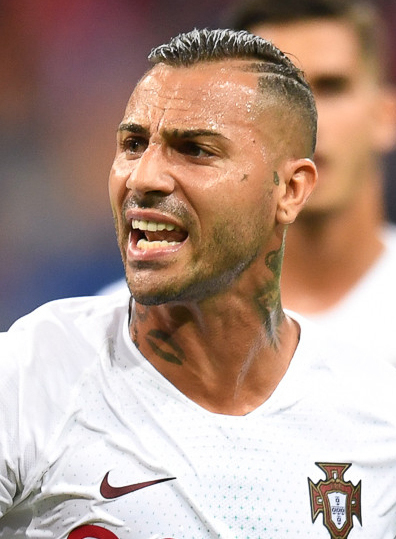
- Quaresma with Portugal at the 2018 FIFA World Cup

Personal information
- Full name: Ricardo Andrade Quaresma Bernardo
- Date of birth: 26 September 1983 (age 43)
- Place of birth: Lisbon, Portugal
- Height: 1.75 m (5 ft 9 in)
- Position: Winger

Youth career
- 1991–1993: Domingos Sávio
- 1994–2000: Sporting CP

Senior career*
Years	Team	Apps	(Gls)
2000–2001	Sporting CP B	16	(0)
2001–2003	Sporting CP	59	(8)
2003–2004	Barcelona	22	(1)
2004–2008	Porto	114	(24)
2008–2010	Inter Milan	24	(1)
2009	→ Chelsea (loan)	4	(0)
2010–2012	Beşiktaş	46	(8)
2013	Al Ahli	10	(2)
2014–2015	Porto	42	(10)
2015–2019	Beşiktaş	108	(13)
2019–2020	Kasımpaşa	26	(4)
2020–2022	Vitória Guimarães	51	(6)
Total		522	(77)

International career
1999	Portugal U15	3	(0)
2000	Portugal U16	12	(2)
2000	Portugal U17	7	(2)
2001–2002	Portugal U19	4	(0)
2002–2006	Portugal U21	28	(6)
2002–2006	Portugal B	4	(0)
2003–2018	Portugal	80	(10)
Medal record
Men's football
Representing Portugal
UEFA European Championship
Winner	2016 France
Bronze medal – third place	2012 Poland-Ukraine
FIFA Confederations Cup
Third place	2017 Russia
UEFA European Under-17 Championship
Winner	2000 Israel
- * Club domestic league appearances and goals

Ricardo Andrade Quaresma Bernardo ComM (Portuguese pronunciation: [ʁiˈkaɾðu kwɐˈɾɛʒmɐ]; born 26 September 1983) is a Portuguese former professional footballer who played as a winger.

He began his career at Sporting CP and went on to play for Barcelona, Inter Milan, Porto (twice), Chelsea, Beşiktaş (twice), Al-Ahli Dubai, Kasımpaşa and Vitória de Guimarães. Regarded as a mercurial talent, his tricks, including the rabona and trivela (a bending shot with the outside of his right foot) made him a popular figure among fans around the world.

A Portugal international for 15 years, Quaresma won 80 caps and played at three European Championships, including the victorious Euro 2016, and the 2018 World Cup.

== Club career ==
=== Sporting CP ===
Quaresma was born in Lisbon. A trainee at Sporting CP's famed academy, the 17-year-old was promoted to the first team by manager László Bölöni before the start of the 2001–02 season, playing 28 Primeira Liga matches and scoring three goals as the team won the double.

Under the same coach, Quaresma scored five times in the league the following campaign, but the team could only finish in third place.

=== Barcelona ===
In July 2003, Quaresma was sold to Barcelona for a reported €6 million fee and the loan of Fábio Rochemback. In his first year in La Liga he made ten starts and 12 substitute appearances, scoring in the 5–0 home rout of Albacete.

Quaresma injured his right foot in the final weeks of the season, forcing him to miss both the 2004 UEFA European Under-21 Championship and UEFA Euro 2004 tournaments. Shortly after, he announced his refusal to play for the Spanish club as long as manager Frank Rijkaard was in charge.

=== Porto ===
Quaresma signed for Porto in the summer of 2004 as Deco moved in the opposite direction for a fee of €15 million plus Quaresma, valued at €6 million. He started the campaign on a high note by scoring the only goal in a win against Benfica in the Supertaça Cândido de Oliveira, and also scored in the 2–1 loss to Valencia in the UEFA Super Cup.

Quaresma scored five goals in his first year at the Estádio do Dragão, and the club finished as runners-up. In the penalty shootout defeat of Once Caldas in the Intercontinental Cup, he successfully converted his attempt in an 8–7 victory in Yokohama.

=== Inter Milan ===
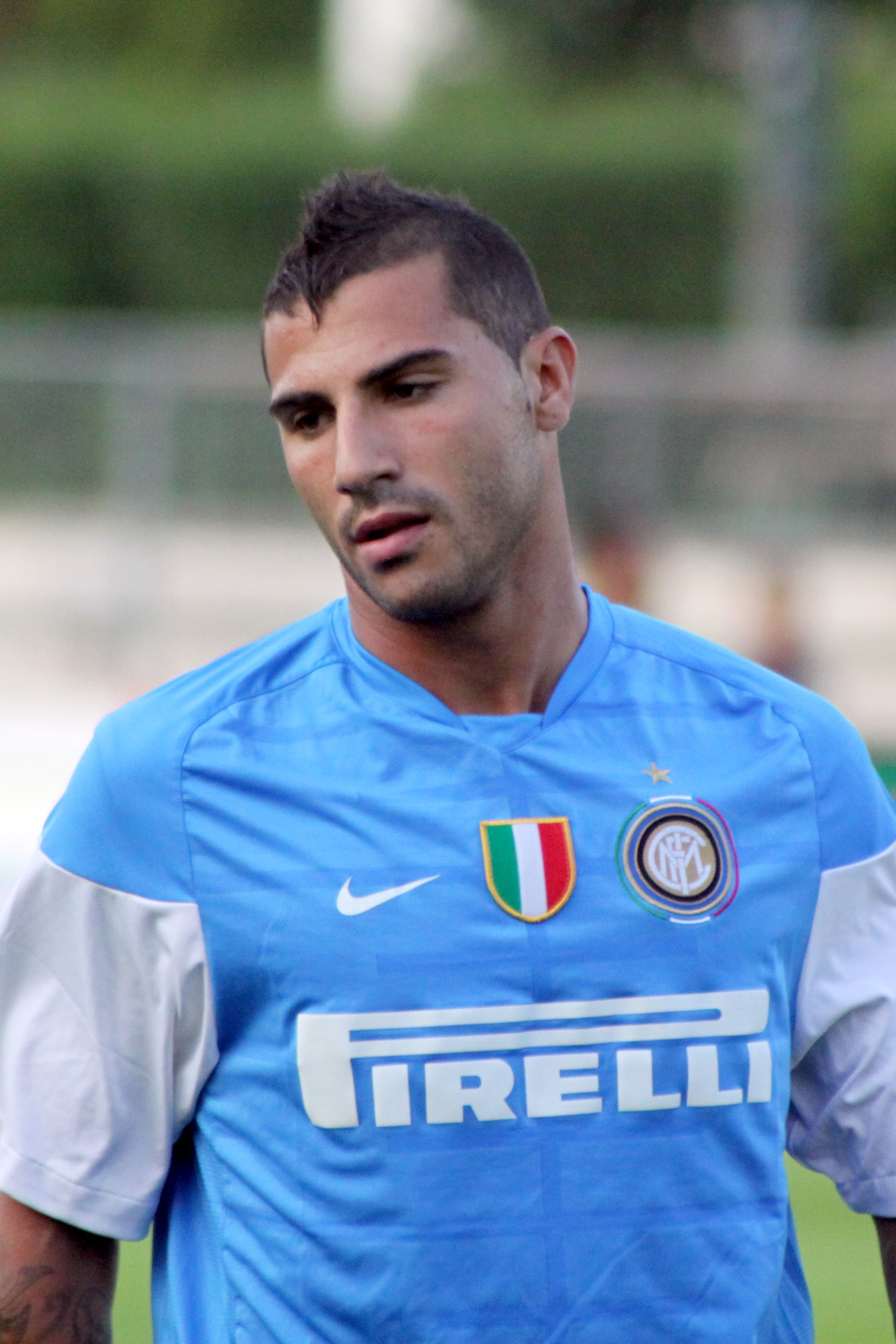
Quaresma with Inter Milan in August 2009

On 1 September 2008, Quaresma signed for Italian champions Inter Milan in a cash/player exchange fee of €18.6 million, with youngster Pelé joining Porto. He scored in his first Serie A match against Catania, with one of his trademark trivelas in a 2–1 home win. However, he found opportunities in the starting XI limited, as coach José Mourinho stated:

"He is a great talent, but the joy I have at seeing the way Ibra works for and with the team I do not yet have with Quaresma. He will have to learn, otherwise he won't play, and I am sure he'll change and become more tactically disciplined. He likes kicking the ball with the outside of his foot, but if you ask me about him in a few months' time, we'll be talking about a different Quaresma."

At the end of the season, Quaresma was given the Bidone d'oro award for the worst footballer in the Italian top division. On 2 February 2009, transfer deadline day, he signed on loan for Premier League club Chelsea until 30 June, making his first appearance five days later in a 0–0 home draw with Hull City. On 7 March, he provided the cross for Alex to score against Coventry City in the sixth round of the FA Cup. After a disappointing start at the San Siro, he said his move had restored his confidence, and he further stated "When I was at Inter, I wasn't feeling very confident. I wasn't playing well and wasn't happy, I already feel more confident here at Chelsea. It has brought the joy back for me, which I didn't have at Inter."

Having returned to Inter despite attempts made by the club to offload him, Quaresma inherited the number 7 shirt following the retirement of his compatriot Luís Figo. However, after the arrival of Goran Pandev he did not feature much in Mourinho's plans as the team went on to win the treble, making 11 appearances in the league without scoring.

=== Beşiktaş ===
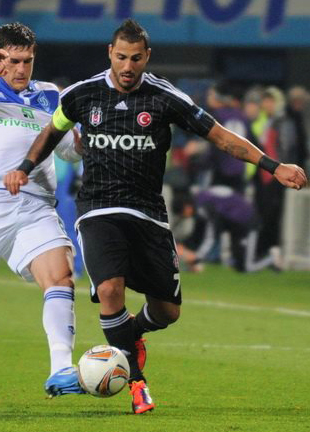
Quaresma playing for Beşiktaş in the UEFA Europa League in 2011

On 13 June 2010, Quaresma joined Beşiktaş of the Turkish Süper Lig, who paid €7.3 million for his services and signed him to a three-year contract, which entitled him to €3.5 million in the first season and €3.75 million in the next two. He scored his first goal for them against Viktoria Plzeň in the UEFA Europa League's third qualifying round, and was also an integral part of their victorious run in the Turkish Cup, opening the scoring in the 33rd minute of the final against İstanbul Başakşehir and being named player of the match after the 4–3 win on penalties.

On 25 April 2011, Quaresma and teammate Nihat Kahveci had a spat on the pitch – the latter was upset at the former for failing to pass the ball, but the altercation was eventually broken up by teammates. Following the 3–1 defeat to Atlético Madrid in the first leg of the Europa League's round of 16 the following 8 March, he had an altercation with Carlos Carvalhal in the dressing room at half-time after the manager replaced him with İsmail Köybaşı, reportedly beginning to throw water bottles before saying, "I brought you here, you just think of yourself. If I was not here, [Carvalhal] would not be here. You can not remove me from the match because you're nothing." He was suspended indefinitely by the club following the incident, and released on 20 December six months before his contract was due to expire, being paid the remaining €1.48 million.

=== Al Ahli ===
On 8 January 2013, Quaresma signed with Al Ahli in the UAE Pro League. He scored two league goals from ten games in his only season, adding another in his sole appearance in a victorious campaign in the UAE President's Cup.

In May 2013, the 29-year-old Quaresma was released.

=== Return to Porto ===
Quaresma returned to Porto on 1 January 2014, where over 10,000 fans greeted him in training. He scored in his first European match of his second spell against Eintracht Frankfurt in the Europa League's round of 32 on 20 February (2–2 home draw), and then set up a goal and scored in a 2–2 draw with Napoli at the Stadio San Paolo. In the quarter-finals of the same competition, he scored a consolation goal in the 4–1 away loss to Sevilla.

On 15 April 2015, Quaresma scored twice in the first ten minutes, starting with a penalty, as Porto defeated Bayern Munich 3–1 in the first leg of their UEFA Champions League's quarter-final tie.

=== Beşiktaş return ===
Quaresma returned to Beşiktaş in July 2015, being greeted by a crowd of thousands at Istanbul Atatürk Airport. He stated his aim was to win the league with the team, which was eventually achieved and retained the following season.

On 26 February 2018, Quaresma scored a trademark trivela goal against Fenerbahçe in the Istanbul derby when he bent the ball around Mauricio Isla into the top corner of the net with the outside of his right foot, the first of his two goals in a 3–1 win.

=== Kasimpaşa ===
The 35-year-old Quaresma continued to ply his trade in the Turkish top division on 29 August 2019, when the free agent signed with Kasımpaşa for one season. In July 2020, he left.

=== Vitória Guimarães ===
On 7 September 2020, Quaresma agreed to a two-year deal with Vitória de Guimarães. He scored four times in his first year, adding six assists in a seventh-place finish.

Quaresma was less played by new manager Pepa in the 2021–22 campaign. In May, he confirmed he was leaving the Estádio D. Afonso Henriques.

== International career ==
A UEFA European Under-16 Championship winner with Portugal in 2000, Quaresma made his debut for the full side on 10 June 2003, in a friendly against Bolivia. Poor form during his time with Barcelona and an injury prevented him from taking part in the Under-21 Championships, Euro 2004 and the 2004 Summer Olympics. He was selected for the 2006 FIFA World Cup qualifying campaign, and he featured in the vital 2–0 victory over Slovakia, but was omitted by coach Luiz Felipe Scolari from the final squad.

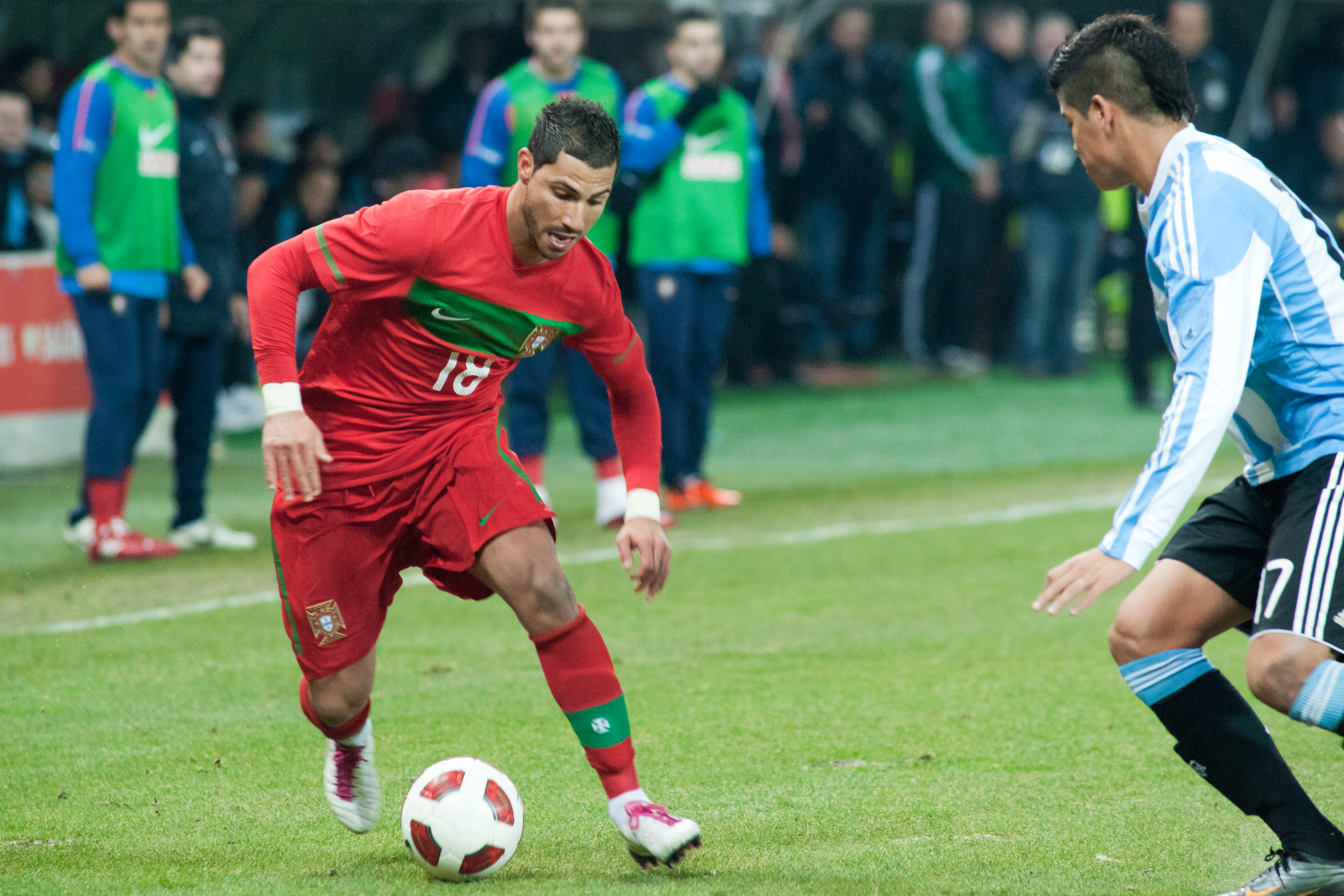
Quaresma (left) challenging Marcos Rojo of Argentina in a friendly on 9 February 2011

In February 2007, Quaresma appeared in a friendly against Brazil at the Emirates Stadium, providing an assist in the 2–0 win and being named man of the match. On 24 March, he scored his first goal for the national team in their 4–0 defeat of Belgium in the UEFA Euro 2008 qualifiers, held in his home town. Picked for the finals in Austria and Switzerland, he replaced Simão Sabrosa for the last ten minutes of the second group match against the Czech Republic, scoring in stoppage time to contribute to a 3–1 win. He started the next match, a 0–2 loss to hosts Switzerland, when nine of the 11 regular starters were rested.

In August 2010, after nearly two years of absence, Quaresma was called up for two Euro 2012 qualifiers against Cyprus and Norway to be held the next month, replacing the injured Cristiano Ronaldo. He played the full 90 minutes in the first match, a 4–4 home draw. After failing to receive any playing time at the Euro 2012 tournament, and being involved in a training incident with teammate Miguel Lopes, Quaresma was named in Portugal's provisional 30-man squad for the 2014 World Cup, but did not make the final cut. Coach Paulo Bento said regarding the matter, "I have to accept that people will question my decisions. Nani has difference [sic] characteristics to Quaresma."

Quaresma scored a penalty, his first international goal in over six years, in a friendly with France on 11 October 2014, but in a 2–1 loss. He was then picked for Euro 2016, where he scored the match's only goal – in the 117th minute – in a last-16 win over Croatia. Five days later, in the quarter-final against Poland, he scored the winning spot-kick in a penalty shootout following a 1–1 draw after extra time. In the final against hosts France on 10 July, he came off the bench for Ronaldo, who was forced off in the opening 25 minutes due to injury; the match ended in a 1–0 extra-time victory to Portugal, which saw the country win its first ever international title.

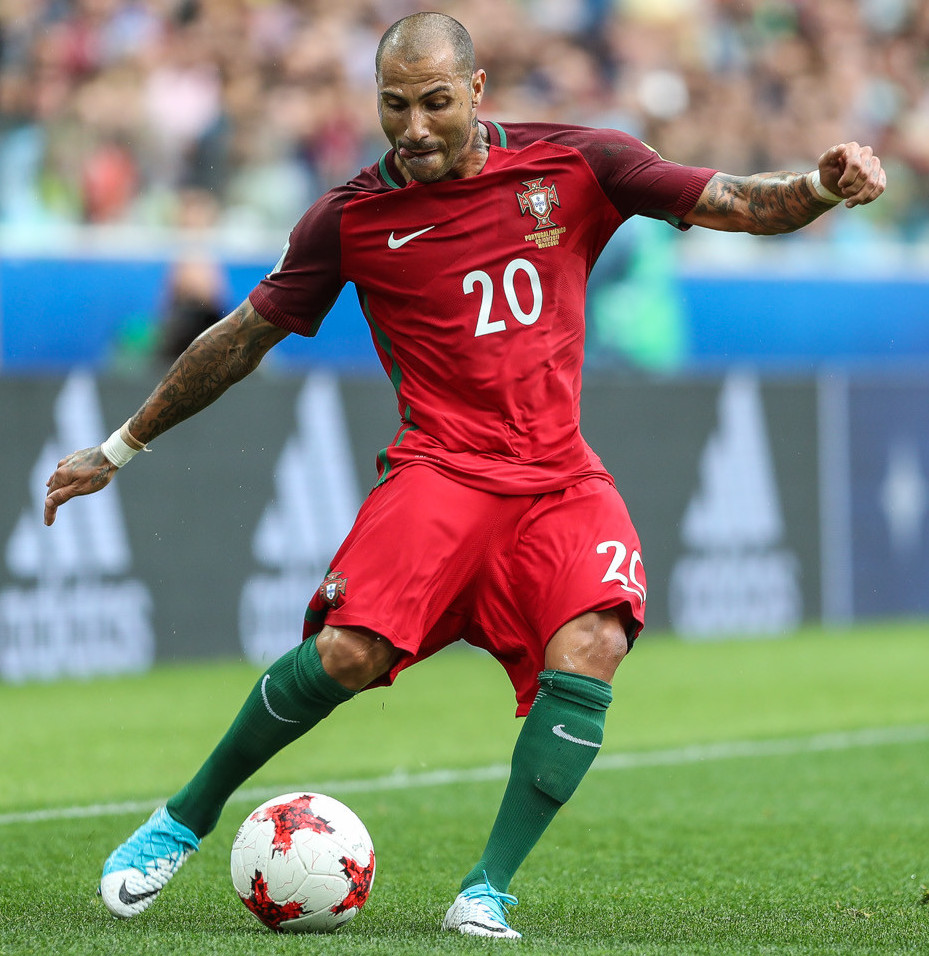
Quaresma in action against Mexico at the 2017 Confederations Cup in Russia

Quaresma was chosen for the 2017 FIFA Confederations Cup. He scored the opening goal of Portugal's 2–2 draw with Mexico in the group stage, and helped his team to an eventual third-place finish.

Fifteen years after his first cap, Quaresma was selected for a World Cup squad for the first time, the 2018 tournament which also took place in Russia. In Portugal's third group match, against Iran, he scored a goal-of-the-tournament contender, playing a one-two with Adrien Silva on the right side of the field before striking the ball with the outside of his right foot—a trademark trivela—into the top left corner of the goal in a 1–1 draw that took his team into the last 16.

== Style of play and temperament ==
Once described as "a mercurial, enigmatic talent", Quaresma was known for his flair and was popular for incorporating a repertoire of tricks into his style of play, including the rabona and trivela, the latter a bending shot with the outside of his right foot. A winger who could play on either flank, his crossing ability, creativity, dribbling skills, technique and poise on the ball, combined with his qualities of speed and finesse caused a regular problem for opposing defences, and also allowed him to create space for his teammates.

Although he was regarded in the media as a highly promising player in his youth, his career was marked by inconsistency; moreover, his work-rate, mentality, tactical discipline and attitude were often brought into question by his managers and the media. He was also accused by certain pundits of being selfish, due to his individualistic playing style and tendency to hold on to possession excessively.

In 2017, Marco Monteiro of FIFA.com described Quaresma as "insanely talented and equally temperamental." He was able to improve upon this weakness as his career progressed, with the BBC noting ahead of the 2014 World Cup that "his workrate has been exemplary since returning home," while Jonathan Liew of The Daily Telegraph commented during Euro 2016: "So it is that a player whose career was widely believed to be over now has the whole country in his hands. The veteran Quaresma is a more mature player these days, creative but reliable, unpredictable but disciplined, a man who will never undo the past but is at least showing signs of learning."

== Personal life ==
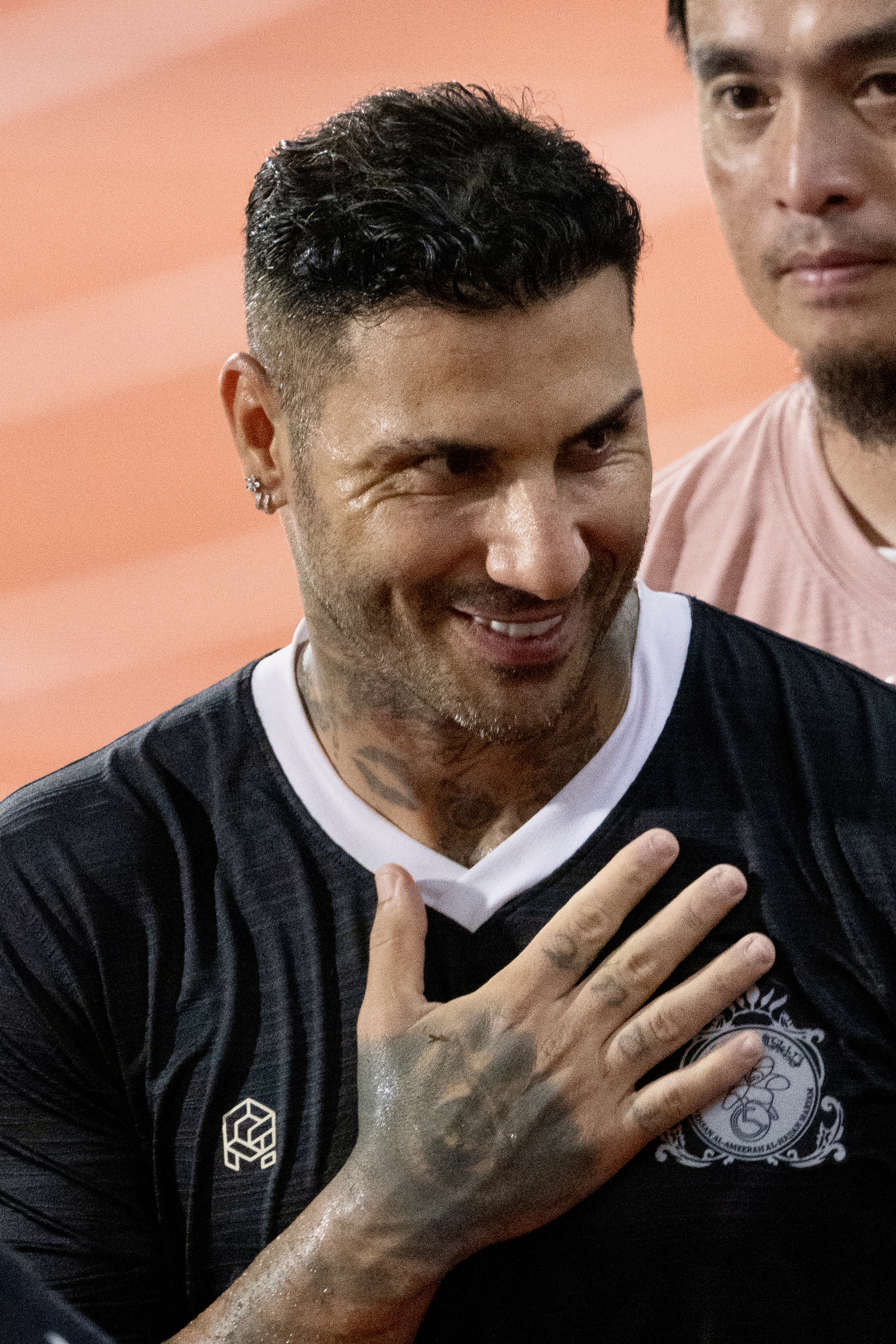
Quaresma playing at a charity exhibition game on 28 June 2024

Quaresma is of partial Romani descent, earning him the nickname "O Cigano" ("The Gypsy"). Speaking of an alleged racial slur towards him by an opponent in 2014, he said, "When I hear people say there is no racism nowadays it makes me laugh. When something happens in Portugal it's always fault of gypsies, blacks, immigrants. It's tough to live with this." In May 2020, he spoke out against the anti-Romani rhetoric of the politician André Ventura.

Quaresma was erroneously quoted by media outlets as being the great-nephew of former Portugal internationals Alfredo Quaresma and Artur Quaresma but later denied this, nonetheless citing them as "an inspiration". He is a distant cousin of fellow footballer Eduardo Quaresma.

Quaresma is known for his tattoos. In 2016, he had two teardrops inked onto his face. Later that year, he had Psalm 91:4 tattooed on the back of his head.

Quaresma had two sons with his partner, and a daughter from a previous relationship. A convert to Catholicism, he was baptised in July 2016 together with his sons in Pêro Pinheiro, Sintra, with teammates Eliseu and Carlos Martins being present at the event.

== Media ==
Quaresma featured in EA Sports' FIFA video game series. He was one of 39 players to earn a five-star skill rating on FIFA 18.

Sponsored by the sportswear and equipment supplier Nike, Quaresma wore Nike Mercurial Superfly VI Elite football boots.

== Career statistics ==
=== Club ===
Appearances and goals by club, season and competition
Club	Season	League			National Cup (Note: Includes Taça de Portugal, Copa del Rey, FA Cup, Turkish Cup, UAE President's Cup)		League Cup (Note: Includes Taça da Liga)		Continental		Other		Total	
Club	Season	Division	Apps	Goals	Apps	Goals	Apps	Goals	Apps	Goals	Apps	Goals	Apps	Goals
Sporting CP	2001–02	Primeira Liga	28	3	6	2	—		2 (Note: Appearances in UEFA Cup)	0	—		36	5
Sporting CP	2002–03	Primeira Liga	31	5	2	0	—		4 (Note: Two appearances in UEFA Cup, two in UEFA Champions League)	0	1 (Note: Appearance in Supertaça Cândido de Oliveira)	0	38	5
Sporting CP	Total		59	8	8	2	—		6	0	1	0	74	10
Barcelona	2003–04	La Liga	22	1	2	0	—		4	0	—		28	1
Porto	2004–05	Primeira Liga	32	5	1	0	—		8 (Note: Appearances in UEFA Champions League)	0	3 (Note: One appearance and one goal in UEFA Super Cup, one appearance in Intercontinental Cup, one appearance and one goal in Supertaça Cândido de Oliveira)	2	44	7
Porto	2005–06	Primeira Liga	29	5	4	0	—		6	0	—		39	5
Porto	2006–07	Primeira Liga	26	6	1	0	—		8	2	1	0	36	8
Porto	2007–08	Primeira Liga	27	8	3	1	—		8	2	1	0	39	11
Porto	Total		114	24	9	1	—		30	4	5	2	158	31
Inter Milan	2008–09	Serie A	13	1	0	0	—		6	0	—		19	1
Inter Milan	2009–10	Serie A	11	0	0	0	—		2	0	—		13	0
Inter Milan	Total		24	1	0	0	—		8	0	—		32	1
Chelsea (loan)	2008–09	Premier League	4	0	1	0	—		—		—		5	0
Beşiktaş	2010–11	Süper Lig	21	3	8	3	—		10 (Note: Appearances in UEFA Europa League)	5	—		39	11
Beşiktaş	2011–12	Süper Lig	25	5	1	0	—		8	2	—		34	7
Beşiktaş	Total		46	8	9	3	—		18	7	—		73	18
Al Ahli	2012–13	UAE Pro League	10	2	1	1	—		—		—		11	3
Porto	2013–14	Primeira Liga	12	4	3	1	3	1	6	3	—		24	9
Porto	2014–15	Primeira Liga	30	6	0	0	3	1	10	3	—		43	10
Porto	Total		42	10	3	1	6	2	16	6	—		67	19
Beşiktaş	2015–16	Süper Lig	26	4	5	0	—		6	1	—		37	5
Beşiktaş	2016–17	Süper Lig	29	2	3	1	—		11 (Note: Six appearances and three goals in UEFA Champions League, five appearances in UEFA Europa League)	3	1 (Note: Appearance in Turkish Super Cup)	0	44	6
Beşiktaş	2017–18	Süper Lig	26	4	4	1	—		7	0	1	0	38	5
Beşiktaş	2018–19	Süper Lig	26	3	0	0	—		8	1	—		34	4
Beşiktaş	2019–20	Süper Lig	1	0	0	0	—		0	0	—		1	0
Beşiktaş	Total		108	13	12	2	—		32	5	2	0	154	20
Kasımpaşa	2019–20	Süper Lig	24	4	0	0	—		—		—		24	4
Vitória Guimarães	2020–21	Primeira Liga	28	4	2	0	1	0	—		—		31	4
Vitória Guimarães	2021–22	Primeira Liga	23	2	2	0	1	0	—		—		26	2
Vitória Guimarães	Total		51	6	4	0	2	0	—		—		57	6
Career total			504	77	49	10	8	2	114	22	8	2	683	113

=== International ===
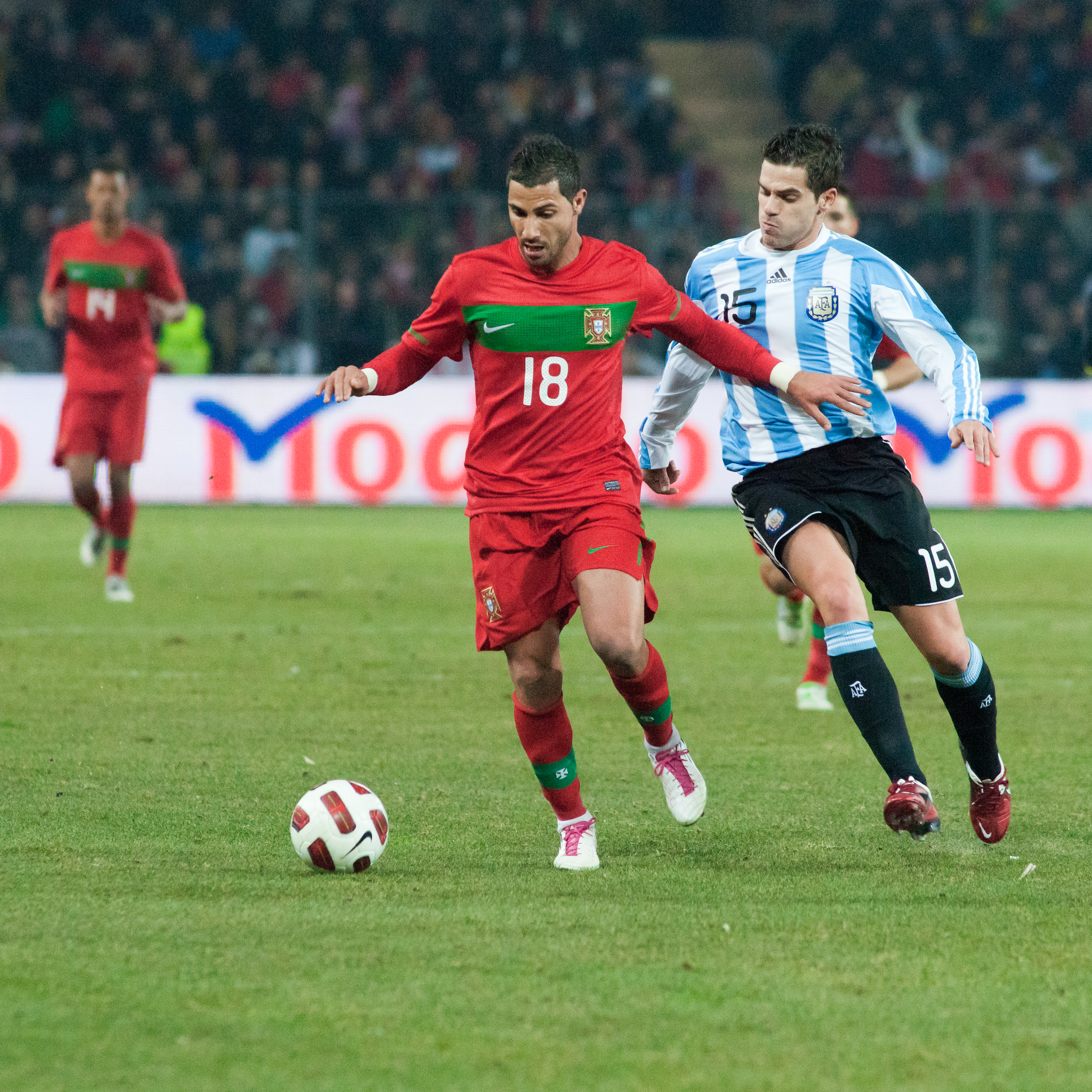
Quaresma in action during a friendly match against Argentina in February 2011, holding off a challenge from Fernando Gago

Appearances and goals by national team and year
National team	Year	Apps	Goals
Portugal	2003	1	0
Portugal	2004	1	0
Portugal	2005	2	0
Portugal	2006	2	0
Portugal	2007	12	1
Portugal	2008	7	2
Portugal	2009	0	0
Portugal	2010	2	0
Portugal	2011	5	0
Portugal	2012	3	0
Portugal	2013	0	0
Portugal	2014	4	1
Portugal	2015	6	0
Portugal	2016	17	4
Portugal	2017	10	1
Portugal	2018	8	1
Total		80	10

Scores and results list Portugal's goal tally first, score column indicates score after each Quaresma goal.

List of international goals scored by Ricardo Quaresma
No.	Date	Venue	Opponent	Score	Result	Competition
1	24 March 2007	Estádio José Alvalade, Lisbon, Portugal	Belgium	3–0	4–0	UEFA Euro 2008 qualifying
2	6 February 2008	Letzigrund, Zürich, Switzerland	Italy	1–2	1–3	Friendly
3	11 June 2008	Stade de Genève, Geneva, Switzerland	Czech Republic	3–1	3–1	UEFA Euro 2008
4	11 October 2014	Stade de France, Saint-Denis, France	France	1–2	1–2	Friendly
5	29 May 2016	Estádio do Dragão, Porto, Portugal	Norway	1–0	3–0	Friendly
6	8 June 2016	Estádio da Luz, Lisbon, Portugal	Estonia	2–0	7–0	Friendly
7	8 June 2016	Estádio da Luz, Lisbon, Portugal	Estonia	6–0	7–0	Friendly
8	25 June 2016	Stade Bollaert-Delelis, Lens, France	Croatia	1–0	1–0 (a.e.t.)	UEFA Euro 2016
9	18 June 2017	Kazan Arena, Kazan, Russia	Mexico	1–0	2–2	2017 FIFA Confederations Cup
10	25 June 2018	Mordovia Arena, Saransk, Russia	Iran	1–0	1–1	2018 FIFA World Cup

== Honours ==
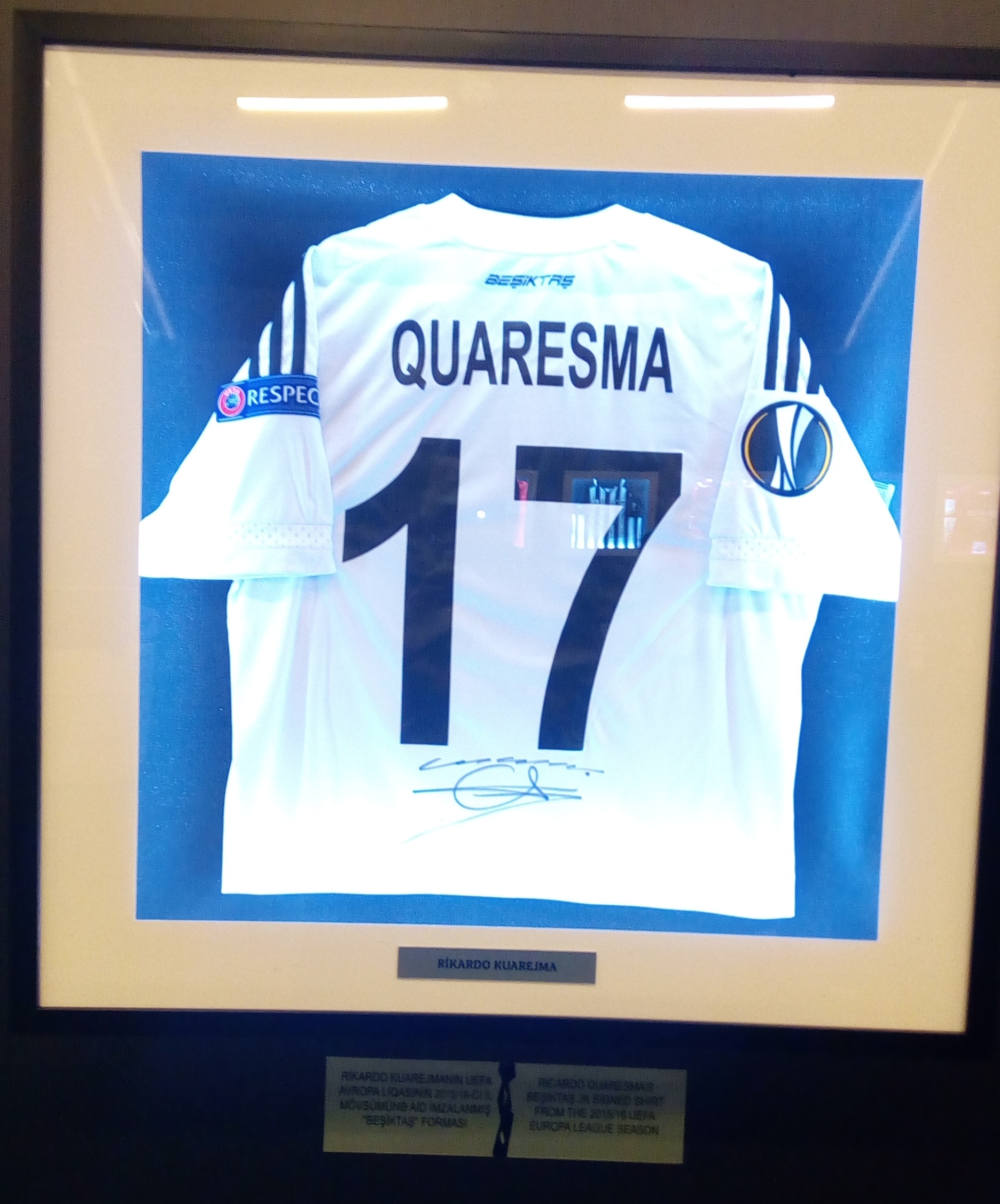
Quaresma's Beşiktaş shirt on display at a 2018 exhibition in Baku, Azerbaijan

Sporting CP

- Primeira Liga: 2001–02
- Taça de Portugal: 2001–02
- Supertaça Cândido de Oliveira: 2002

Porto

- Primeira Liga: 2005–06, 2006–07, 2007–08
- Taça de Portugal: 2005–06
- Supertaça Cândido de Oliveira: 2004, 2006
- Intercontinental Cup: 2004

Inter Milan

- Serie A: 2008–09, 2009–10
- Coppa Italia: 2009–10
- UEFA Champions League: 2009–10

Beşiktaş

- Süper Lig: 2015–16, 2016–17
- Turkish Cup: 2010–11

Al Ahli

- UAE President's Cup: 2012–13

Portugal U16

- UEFA European Under-16 Championship: 2000

Portugal

- UEFA European Championship: 2016

Individual

- LPFP Primeira Liga Player of the Year: 2005–06
- SJPF Player of the Month: November 2005, December 2005, November 2006, December 2006

Orders

- Commander of the Order of Merit
