= Giourkas Seitaridis =

Greek footballer (born 1981)

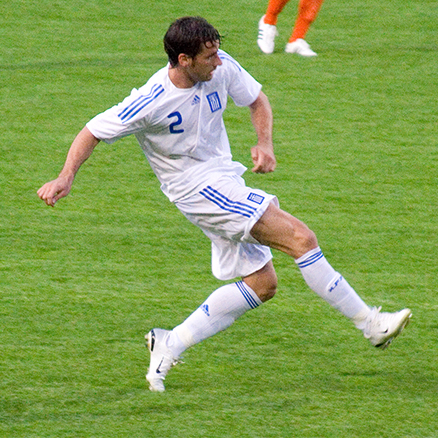
- Seitaridis playing for Greece in 2008

Personal information
- Full name: Georgios Seitaridis
- Date of birth: 4 June 1981 (age 45)
- Place of birth: Piraeus, Greece
- Height: 1.85 m (6 ft 1 in)
- Positions: Right-back; centre-back

Senior career*
Years	Team	Apps	(Gls)
1998–2001	PAS Giannina	40	(5)
2001–2004	Panathinaikos	77	(1)
2004–2005	Porto	23	(0)
2005–2006	Dynamo Moscow	8	(0)
2006–2009	Atlético Madrid	59	(0)
2009–2013	Panathinaikos	41	(0)
Total		248	(6)

International career
2002–2010	Greece	72	(1)
2000–2002	Greece U21	12	(0)
Medal record
Men's football
Representing Greece
UEFA European Championship
Winner	2004
- * Club domestic league appearances and goals

Georgios "Giourkas" Seitaridis (Greek: Γεώργιος "Γιούρκας" Σεϊταρίδης [ʝeˈorʝioz ˈʝurkas seitaˈriðis]; born 4 June 1981) is a Greek former professional footballer who played as a right-back and occasionally as a centre-back. He has last played in 2013 for Super League Greece side Panathinaikos, having played previously at PAS Giannina, Porto, Dynamo Moscow and Atlético Madrid. He is a former member of the Greece national team, for which he made a total of 72 international appearances, scoring one goal. He was part of their team which won Euro 2004, for which he was voted into the Team of the Tournament.

Both his grandfather and father, Dimitris Seitaridis, were footballers and eventually managers.

== Club career ==
=== PAS Giannina ===
Of Pontic Greek heritage, Seitaridis started his professional career with northern Greek side PAS Giannina, nicknamed Ajax of Epirus, in 1997, becoming an important right full-back for the club. Seitaridis helped the team towards the promotion of the Super League 2 in the 1999–2000 at the Super League Greece. He made a total of 40 league appearances with PAS Giannina, scoring 5 goals.

=== Panathinaikos ===
He was soon spotted by Athens-based club Panathinaikos, and on 12 January 2001 he signed a 5-year contract with them for a total fee of 300 million drachmas. He quickly established himself as a regular player for the team and at the age of 22 he won his first silverware by helping Panathinaikos do the double at the 2003–04 season, winning the 2003–04 Alpha Ethniki and the Greek Cup against rivals Olympiacos.

He scored his first European goal against Manchester United on 7 March 2001, in a game for the second group stage of the 2000–01 UEFA Champions League. In September of the same year, he was named Greek Young Footballer of 2001, along with Pantelis Kafes and Angelos Charisteas.

=== Porto ===
On 11 June 2004, a day before the eventually successful UEFA Euro 2004 campaign for Greece, it was rumored that Seitaridis signed for Portuguese side, and at the time Champions League holders, F.C. Porto, for a transfer fee of €3 million. However, the official announcement was made on 26 July 2004, almost a month and a half later, with rumors linking him to Real Madrid in the meantime. He helped the Dragões win the Portuguese SuperCup and Intercontinental Cup of that year.

=== Dynamo Moscow ===
On 23 May 2005, he was sold to Russian side Dynamo Moscow for €10 million, following the footsteps of ex-Porto teammates Derlei, Costinha, Maniche and Thiago Silva, who also moved to the Russian club the same year. Soon however, Seitaridis began to show his discomfort at the club, failing to settle in Moscow, and claimed the reasons he wanted to leave was that the weather was different from his native Greece and that he could not adapt to the cold. In his one-year spell at the club, he only managed to make 8 league appearances before deciding to leave.

=== Atlético Madrid ===
On 16 June 2006 he was transferred to Atlético Madrid for a fee of €12 million, being the second Greek footballer to play for Atlético after striker Demis Nikolaidis. The latter was the one who convinced him to join the club, together with his ex-Dynamo teammate Costinha who joined Atlético the same year. Seitaridis was sent off in the first half of his debut game, in the La Liga opening match away to Racing Santander on 27 August 2006. On 15 October 2006, he received his second red card only six games into the season, as he was cautioned twice in a home league game against Recreativo Huelva.

He scored his first goal for Atlético the following year, on 21 July 2007, in a game against Gloria Bistriţa for the Intertoto Cup. In November 2007, Seitaridis damaged his achilles tendon in a match against UD Almería, which meant he needed to undergo surgery. His period of absence was initially evaluated at about six weeks, but he was ready two and a half months later, in April 2008. Due to his injury problem, he only managed to make 14 league appearances for Atlético in the 2007–08 season.

The 2008–09 season did not start well for Seitaridis, as he lost his place in the first team to new signings Tomáš Ujfaluši and John Heitinga, and his heavy contract meant that Atlético was looking to sell him. Despite that, Seitaridis was a starter in Atlético's opening game, in a 4–0 victory over Málaga CF, and went on to make 14 league appearances that season. On 29 April 2009 however, him and teammate Maniche were suspended by Atlético's president Enrique Cerezo because they failed to appear in an Atlético home match against Sporting Gijón despite not being included in the 18-man squad. Two weeks later on 13 May 2009, it was announced that Seitaridis was released by Atlético a year before his contract was to expire, with a statement on the club's official website reading "Seitaridis is therefore free to negotiate with other clubs who may be interested in signing him".

=== Return to Panathinaikos ===
On 10 September 2009, the last day of the Greek transfer period for free agent players, Seitaridis signed a 4-year deal with Panathinaikos, returning to the team after five years. It soon became apparent that Giourkas was unfit and was struggling to re-establish himself due to frequent injuries, missing most of the 2009–10 season's matches. However, on 21 March 2010, he surprisingly returned to the line-up for the big derby against rivals Olympiacos, and despite their defeat, Panathinaikos managed to end the season positively by winning the double. Seitaridis himself didn't appear at the 2009–10 Greek Football Cup final against Aris due to injury, but made 2 appearances on the road to the final.

The 2010–11 season started well for Seitaridis, being a starter at Panathinaikos' opening league fixture against Skoda Xanthi on 27 August 2010 and giving a good performance. However, another muscle injury meant that Seitaridis would return at a league game against Panserraikos two months later, on 4 December. Due to the player's poor condition he was placed on the transfer list in January 2011, but despite various offers from foreign teams during the summer transfer period, he stayed at Panathinaikos.

The 2011–12 season was even more disappointing for him, as he was only used for 45 minutes in an away game against Atromitos, where he was substituted at half-time due to poor performance. He played for a second time in an away game against Asteras Tripolis, staying on the pitch a full 90 minutes.

The 2012–13 season started well for Seitaridis, playing as a starter in the first three league matches at the beginning of the season. He also contributed with one assist in Panathinaikos' 2012–13 UEFA Europa League group stage match against Tottenham Hotspur, which ended 1–1.

At the summer of 2013 he didn't renew his contract and left the club.

== International career ==
=== Youth career ===
Seitaridis is a former Greece under-21 international, making his debut on 6 October 2000, in a 2002 UEFA Under-21 Championship qualifier against Finland under-21. He participated at the finals of the 2002 UEFA Under-21 Championship in Switzerland, where his team was eliminated from the group stage, having collected one point in three games.

=== First steps & UEFA Euro 2004 ===
Seitaridis made his international debut with the senior team on 13 February 2002, in an international friendly match against Sweden. He helped Greece qualify to the UEFA Euro 2004 in Portugal for the second time in history, and was also one of the key players during Greece's successful campaign, a win that shocked the footballing world as Greece were considered outsiders before the tournament started. Seitaridis won a penalty at the first match against Portugal as he was knocked down by Cristiano Ronaldo. In the final, he also won the important corner by playing the ball in the center which was blocked from Cristiano Ronaldo. Overall his contributions for the victorious team were recognised by naming him as part of the 23-man UEFA 2004 All-Star squad, together with fellow Greek players Antonis Nikopolidis, Traianos Dellas, Theodoros Zagorakis and Angelos Charisteas.

=== FIFA Confederations Cup 2005 ===
As a result of the win at Euro 2004, Greece qualified to the 2005 FIFA Confederations Cup in Germany as European champions. Giourkas Seitaridis was a member of the 23-man squad.

=== UEFA Euro 2008 & 2010 FIFA World Cup ===
He scored his debut international goal on 2 June 2007 against Hungary in a Euro 2008 qualifying match, helping the Greece national team to qualify to the UEFA Euro 2008 championship. He played twice in the disappointing Euro 2008 campaign for Greece, having been injured during the second game against Russia.

Despite concerns about his fitness, Greece national manager Otto Rehhagel called Seitaridis in his 23-man squad for the 2010 FIFA World Cup. He only played for 90 minutes in the first game of the group stage against South Korea, losing 2–0. After this game, Seitaridis played two consecutive European and a World Cup with the Greece national team.

== Career statistics ==
=== Club ===
Appearances and goals by club, season and competition
Club	Season	League			Cup		Europe		Other		Total	
Club	Season	Division	Apps	Goals	Apps	Goals	Apps	Goals	Apps	Goals	Apps	Goals
PAS Giannina	1998–99	Beta Ethniki	6	0	–	–	–	–	–	–	6	0
PAS Giannina	1999–00	Beta Ethniki	24	3	–	–	–	–	–	–	24	3
PAS Giannina	2000–01	Alpha Ethniki	10	2	–	–	–	–	–	–	10	2
Panathinaikos	2000–01	Alpha Ethniki	12	0	–	–	2	1	–	–	14	1
Panathinaikos	2001–02	Alpha Ethniki	19	0	1	0	7	0	–	–	27	0
Panathinaikos	2002–03	Alpha Ethniki	25	0	2	0	2	0	–	–	29	0
Panathinaikos	2003–04	Alpha Ethniki	21	0	6	0	8	0	–	–	35	0
Porto	2004–05	Primeira Liga	23	0	2	0	11	0	–	–	36	0
Dynamo Moscow	2005	Russian Premier League	8	0	–	–	–	–	–	–	8	0
Atlético Madrid	2006–07	La Liga	31	0	2	0	–	–	–	–	33	0
Atlético Madrid	2007–08	La Liga	14	0	–	–	4	1	–	–	18	1
Atlético Madrid	2008–09	La Liga	14	0	2	0	4	0	–	–	20	0
Panathinaikos	2009–10	Super League Greece	8	0	2	0	–	–	–	–	10	0
Panathinaikos	2010–11	Super League Greece	7	0	2	0	–	–	–	–	9	0
Panathinaikos	2011–12	Super League Greece	2	0	–	–	–	–	1	0	3	0
Panathinaikos	2012–13	Super League Greece	24	0	3	0	5	0	1	0	33	0
Career total			248	5	22	0	43	2	2	0	315	7

=== International ===
Score and result list Greece's goal tally first, score column indicates score after Seitaridis goal.

International goal scored by Giourkas Seitaridis
No.	Date	Venue	Opponent	Score	Result	Competition
1	2 June 2007	Pankritio Stadium, Heraklion, Greece	Hungary	2–0	2–0	Euro 2008 qualifying

== Honours ==
PAS Giannina

- Beta Ethniki: 1999–2000

Panathinaikos

- Super League Greece: 2003–04, 2009–10
- Greek Cup: 2003–04, 2009–10

Porto

- Supertaça Cândido de Oliveira: 2004
- Intercontinental Cup: 2004

Greece

- UEFA European Championship: 2004

Individual

- Greek Young Footballer of the Year: 2001
- UEFA European Championship Team of the Tournament: 2004
