= Miguel Areias =

Portuguese footballer (born 1977)

Personal information
- Full name: Miguel Alexandre Areias Lopes
- Date of birth: 2 June 1977 (age 49)
- Place of birth: Porto, Portugal
- Height: 1.89 m (6 ft 2 in)
- Position: Left-back

Youth career
- 1986–1991: Porto
- 1991–1992: Candal
- 1992–1993: Espinho
- 1993–1995: Salgueiros

Senior career*
Years	Team	Apps	(Gls)
1995–1996	Ermesinde		
1996–1997	Estrela Portalegre		
1997–1998	Juventude Ronfe		
1998–2000	Ovarense	61	(11)
2000–2004	Beira-Mar	71	(1)
2004–2007	Porto	9	(0)
2005–2006	→ Boavista (loan)	30	(0)
2006	→ Standard Liège (loan)	10	(1)
2007	→ Celta (loan)	1	(0)
2007–2008	Belenenses	5	(0)
2008–2009	Trofense	14	(0)
2010–2011	Leixões	9	(0)
Total		210	(13)
- * Club domestic league appearances and goals

Miguel Alexandre Areias Lopes (born 2 June 1977), known as Areias, is a Portuguese former professional footballer who played mainly as a left-back.

== Career ==
After establishing himself as a professional player with S.C. Beira-Mar, Porto-born Areias joined Primeira Liga club FC Porto for the 2004–05 season but, after being rarely used, he was consecutively loaned for the duration of his contract: Boavista FC, Standard Liège (where he teamed up with former Portuguese internationals Sérgio Conceição and Ricardo Sá Pinto) and RC Celta de Vigo; arrived in January 2007 at the latter, he only managed one La Liga appearance during his short spell, a 0–2 home loss against RCD Espanyol.

Released, Areias signed with C.F. Os Belenenses on a free transfer, for the 2007–08 campaign. Unsettled, he switched the following year to newly promoted C.D. Trofense, also in the top division. After featuring rarely as the Lisbon side finished eighth, he could not help prevent the northern newcomers from being relegated in their first season ever.

In the summer of 2010, after one year out of football, the 33-year-old Areias signed with Leixões S.C. of the Segunda Liga. He left at the end of the season, having played less than one third of the league games for the Matosinhos-based team.

Areias retired in 2011, and started working immediately as a players' agent. He returned to Porto four years later, as youth coach.
