= 2001–02 FC Porto season =

FC Porto
2001–02 season
- President: Jorge Nuno Pinto da Costa
- Head coach: Octávio Machado (until 20 January); José Mourinho (from 21 January)
- Stadium: Estádio das Antas
- Primeira Liga: 3rd
- Taça de Portugal: Quarter-finals
- Champions League: Second group stage
- Supertaça Cândido de Oliveira: Winners
- Top goalscorer: League: Deco (13); All: Deco (19)
colours	colours	colours

The 2001–02 season was the 117th season in the existence of FC Porto and the club's 87th consecutive season in the top flight of Portuguese football. In addition to the domestic league, Porto participated in this season's editions of the Taça de Portugal and the UEFA Champions League.

== Squad ==
Squad at end of season

Note: Flags indicate national team as defined under FIFA eligibility rules; some limited exceptions apply. Players may hold more than one non-FIFA nationality.

No.	Pos.	Nation	Player
4	DF	POR	Ricardo Carvalho
5	MF	PAR	Carlos Paredes
6	MF	POR	Costinha
7	DF	POR	Carlos Secretário
8	MF	SVN	Miran Pavlin
10	MF	POR	Deco
11	DF	BRA	Rubens Júnior
13	DF	POR	Jorge Andrade
14	MF	SWE	Fredrik Söderström
15	MF	RUS	Dmitri Alenichev
17	DF	ARG	Hugo Ibarra
19	FW	BRA	Rafael
20	MF	POR	Paulinho Santos
21	MF	POR	Capucho
22	MF	PAR	Victor Quintana

No.	Pos.	Nation	Player
24	GK	POR	Paulo Santos
25	MF	POR	Cândido Costa
26	MF	POR	Ricardo Sousa
28	MF	BRA	Clayton
29	FW	POR	Paulo Costa
30	DF	POR	Mário Silva
31	FW	BRA	Pena
33	DF	POR	Ricardo Silva
37	MF	POR	Joca
41	FW	POR	Hélder Postiga
44	GK	POR	Pedro Espinha
45	DF	POR	Ricardo Costa
55	GK	RUS	Sergei Ovchinnikov
66	FW	ECU	Iván Kaviedes (on loan from Celta)
77	FW	RSA	Benni McCarthy (on loan from Celta)
99	GK	POR	Vítor Baía

=== Out on loan ===
Note: Flags indicate national team as defined under FIFA eligibility rules; some limited exceptions apply. Players may hold more than one non-FIFA nationality.

No.	Pos.	Nation	Player
2	DF	POR	Jorge Costa (on loan to Charlton Athletic)
27	DF	POR	José Sousa (on loan to Farense)

== Competitions ==
=== Overall record ===
Competition	First match	Last match	Starting round	Final position	Record							
Competition	First match	Last match	Starting round	Final position	Pld	W	D	L	GF	GA	GD	Win %
Primeira Liga	12 August 2001	4 May 2002	Matchday 1	3rd	34	21	5	8	66	34	+32	61.76
Taça de Portugal	17 November 2001	16 January 2002	Fourth round	Quarter-finals	4	3	0	1	10	3	+7	75.00
Supertaça Cândido de Oliveira	4 August 2001		Final	Winners	1	1	0	0	1	0	+1	100.00
UEFA Champions League	24 July 2001	20 March 2002	Second round	Second group stage	16	6	3	7	24	19	+5	37.50
Total					55	31	8	16	101	56	+45	56.36

Source: Competitions

=== Primeira Liga ===
==== League table ====
Pos	Team	Pld	W	D	L	GF	GA	GD	Pts	Qualification or relegation
1	Sporting CP (C)	34	22	9	3	74	25	+49	75	Qualification to Champions League third qualifying round
2	Boavista	34	21	7	6	53	20	+33	70	Qualification to Champions League second qualifying round
3	Porto	34	21	5	8	66	34	+32	68	Qualification to UEFA Cup first round
4	Benfica	34	17	12	5	66	37	+29	63	Qualification to UEFA Cup first round
5	Belenenses	34	17	6	11	54	44	+10	57	Qualification to Intertoto Cup second round

Source: Primeira Divisão
Rules for classification: 1) points; 2) head-to-head points; 3) head-to-head goal difference; 4) goal difference; 5) number of goals scored
(C) Champions

==== Results summary ====
Overall								Home						Away					
Pld	W	D	L	GF	GA	GD	Pts	W	D	L	GF	GA	GD	W	D	L	GF	GA	GD
34	21	5	8	66	34	+32	68	12	3	2	38	16	+22	9	2	6	28	18	+10

Source: Liga Portugal

==== Results by round ====
Round	1	2	3	4	5	6	7	8	9	10	11	12	13	14	15	16	17	18	19	20	21	22	23	24	25	26	27	28	29	30	31	32	33	34
Ground	A	H	A	H	A	H	A	H	H	A	H	A	H	A	H	A	H	H	A	H	A	H	A	H	A	A	H	A	H	A	H	A	H	A
Result	L	W	W	W	D	W	L	W	L	W	W	W	W	L	D	L	W	D	L	W	W	W	W	L	W	L	D	D	W	W	W	W	W	W
Position	13	4	3	1	2	2	2	1	3	3	2	1	1	2	2	3	3	4	5	4	4	3	3	3	3	3	4	4	4	4	4	3	3	3

Source: Liga Portugal
A = Away; H = Home; W = Win; D = Draw; L = Loss

==== Matches ====
12 August 2001 1	Sporting CP	1–0	Porto	Lisbon
WEST (UTC+1)	Quaresma (yellow card) 43'; Niculae 70'	Report	Costinha (yellow card) 18' (yellow-red card) 37'; Silva (yellow card) 28'; Ovchinnikov (yellow card) 70'; Costa (yellow card) 79'	Stadium: Estádio José Alvalade; Referee: Lucílio Batista

19 August 2001 2	Porto	4–1	Boavista	Porto
WEST (UTC+1)	Clayton 21'; Silva (yellow card) 58'; Costa 80'; Andrade 88'; Postiga 90'	Report	Emanuel (yellow card) 34' (yellow-red card) 82'; Santos (yellow card) 35'; Petit 68'; Frechaut (yellow card) 74'	Stadium: Estádio das Antas; Referee: Jacinto Paixão

27 August 2001 3	Marítimo	1–3	Porto	Funchal
WEST (UTC+1)	Fernandes 16' (yellow card) 66' van der Gaag (yellow card) 30'; Gaúcho (yellow card) 53' (yellow-red card) 87'; Richardson (yellow card) 54'; Dal Pozzo (yellow card) 61'; Lino (yellow card) 77'; Kenedy (red card) 81'	Report	Deco 1'; Costinha 4' (yellow card) 89'; Pena 53'; Capucho (yellow card) 71'	Stadium: Estádio do Marítimo; Referee: Bruno Paixão

9 September 2001 4	Porto	3–0	Varzim	Porto
WEST (UTC+1)	Costinha (yellow card) 38'; Pena (yellow card) 46' (goal) 85'; Carvalho 75' (o.g.); Capucho 87'	Report	Gilmar (yellow card) 28'; Mariano (yellow card) 58'	Stadium: Estádio das Antas; Referee: Duarte Gomes

15 September 2001 5	Benfica	0–0	Porto	Lisbon
WEST (UTC+1)	Fuchs (yellow card) 8'; Andrade (yellow card) 28'; Cabral (yellow card) 39'; Caneira (yellow card) 72'; Meira (yellow card) 78'	Report	Capucho (yellow card) 12'; Silva (yellow card) 21'; Costa (yellow card) 89'	Stadium: Estádio da Luz; Referee: Vítor Melo Pereira

22 September 2001 6	Porto	3–0	Vitória de Setúbal	Porto
WEST (UTC+1)	Deco (yellow card) 35'; Postiga 58'; Pena 62'; Alenichev 69'	Report	Veiga (yellow card) 30'; Ferreira (yellow card) 45'; Ico (yellow card) 60'; Alcântara (yellow card) 84'	Stadium: Estádio das Antas; Referee: Isidoro Rodrigues

29 September 2001 7	Beira-Mar	2–0	Porto	Aveiro
WEST (UTC+1)	Cristiano 21'; Manuel (yellow card) 40' (goal) 86'; Ribeiro (yellow card) 44'; Filipe (yellow card) 69'; Aguiar (yellow card) 82'	Report	Júnior (yellow card) 20'; Alenichev (yellow card) 43' (yellow-red card) 48'; Deco (yellow card) 77'; Clayton (yellow card) 84'	Stadium: Estádio Mário Duarte; Referee: Luís Miranda

13 October 2001 8	Porto	3–0	Salgueiros	Porto
WEST (UTC+1)	Clayton 17'; Costinha (yellow card) 37'; Pena 42'; Capucho 87'	Report	Claúdio (yellow card) 35'; Correia (yellow card) 46'	Stadium: Estádio das Antas; Referee: Martins dos Santos

20 October 2001 9	Porto	1–2	Belenenses	Porto
WEST (UTC+1)	Deco (yellow card) 20'; Pena 83'	Report	Zé Afonso (yellow card) 27' (goal) 58'; Filgueira 36'; Vidigal (yellow card) 89'	Stadium: Estádio das Antas; Referee: Olegário Benquerença

28 October 2001 10	Alverca	0–1	Porto	Alverca
WEST (UTC+1)	Veríssimo (yellow card) 44'; Anderson (yellow card) 67'; Poejo (yellow card) 78'	Report	Capucho 80'; Andrade (yellow card) 81'; Deco (yellow card) 88'	Stadium: Complexo do Alverca; Referee: Lucílio Batista

4 November 2001 11	Porto	2–1	União de Leiria	Porto
WEST (UTC+1)	Deco (yellow card) 44' (goal) 72'; Pena 55'; Costinha (yellow card) 64'	Report	Pereira (yellow card) 20'; Silas 26' (yellow card) 71'; Jorge (yellow card) 35'; Valente (yellow card) 61'; Freddy (yellow card) 76'; Derlei (yellow card) 88'	Stadium: Estádio das Antas; Referee: António Costa

25 November 2001 12	Gil Vicente	2–5	Porto	Barcelos
WEST (UTC+1)	Manoel 78'; Martins 88' (pen.)	Report	Deco 4', 29'; Clayton 43'; Capucho 64'; Costinha (yellow card) 66' (goal) 90'; Silva (yellow card) 87'	Stadium: Estádio Adelino Ribeiro Novo; Referee: Francisco Ferreira

30 November 2001 13	Porto	2–0	Farense	Porto
WEST (UTC+1)	Deco 11'; Clayton 30'	Report		Stadium: Estádio das Antas; Referee: Lucílio Batista

8 December 2001 14	Vitória de Guimarães	2–0	Porto	Guimarães
WEST (UTC+1)	Couto 2'; Nuno Assis 45'; Mendes (yellow card) 47'; Ferreira (yellow card) 61'; Cunha (yellow card) 80'; Guga (yellow card) 88'; Cléber (yellow card) 90'	Report	Deco (yellow card) 19'; Ibarra (yellow card) 58'; Capucho (yellow card) 90'	Stadium: Estádio D. Afonso Henriques; Referee: Paulo Baptista

15 December 2001 15	Porto	0–0	Braga	Porto
WEST (UTC+1)	Deco (yellow card) 45'	Report	Lima (yellow card) 26'; Gomes (yellow card) 32'	Stadium: Estádio das Antas; Referee: Olegário Benquerença

22 December 2001 16	Santa Clara	2–1	Porto	Ponta Delgada
WEST (UTC+1)	Toñito 18' (pen.), 57'; Telmo (yellow card) 40'; Nunes (yellow card) 55'; Gregório (yellow card) 71'; Portela (yellow card) 77'	Report	Andrade (yellow card) 17'; Carvalho (yellow card) 30'; Postiga 65'; Deco (yellow card) 83'; Baía (yellow card) 90'	Stadium: Estádio de São Miguel; Referee: Emanuel Câmara

6 January 2002 17	Porto	1–0	Paços de Ferreira	Porto
WEST (UTC+1)	Deco 42'; Paredes (yellow card) 45'; Alenichev (yellow card) 79'	Report	Gouveia (yellow card) 9'	Stadium: Estádio das Antas; Referee: Augusto Duarte

12 January 2002 18	Porto	2–2	Sporting CP	Porto
WEST (UTC+1)	Andrade 6' (pen.); Silva (yellow card) 10'; Capucho (yellow card) 34'; Carvalho (yellow card) 34'; Pena (yellow card) 36'; Deco 72'	Report	Ferreira (yellow card) 5'; Barbosa 32' (yellow card) 39' (yellow-red card) 75'; Jardel 34' (pen.) (yellow card) 41' (yellow-red card) 90'; Beto (yellow card) 36'; Viana (yellow card) 45'; Bento (yellow card) 59' (yellow-red card) 59'	Stadium: Estádio das Antas; Referee: Martins dos Santos

20 January 2002 19	Boavista	2–0	Porto	Porto
WEST (UTC+1)	Petit (Portuguese footballer) 44'; Erwin Sánchez	Report	Paredes (yellow card) 14'; Costinha (yellow card) 23'; Alenichev (yellow card) 45'; Andrade (yellow card) 55'; Deco (yellow card) 63' (yellow-red card) 86'; Costa (yellow card) 68'; Santos (yellow card) 86'	Stadium: Estádio do Bessa; Referee: Paulo Costa

26 January 2002 20	Porto	2–1	Marítimo	Porto
WEST (UTC+1)	Briguel 19' (o.g.); Postiga 44'; Pavlin (yellow card) 52'; Costinha (yellow card) 80'	Report	Gaúcho (yellow card) 33'; Briguel (yellow card) 37'; Alan 54'; Ezequias (yellow card) 85' (yellow-red card) 86'	Stadium: Estádio das Antas; Referee: Carlos Xistra

3 February 2002 21	Varzim	0–1	Porto	Póvoa de Varzim
WEST (UTC+1)	Vidigal (yellow card) 57'; Vilacova (yellow card) 77'; Mendonça (yellow card) 77'	Report	Clayton (yellow card) 37'; Pena (yellow card) 63'; Costa (yellow card) 71'; Deco (yellow card) 75' (goal) 77' (pen.)	Stadium: Estádio do Varzim; Referee: Francisco Ferreira

10 February 2002 22	Porto	3–2	Benfica	Porto
WEST (UTC+1)	Secretário (yellow card) 25'; Pavlin (yellow card) 31'; Deco 42'; Alenichev 48'; Capucho 53'	Report	Simão 17' (yellow card) 68'; Mantorras 54'; Aguiar (yellow card) 76'	Stadium: Estádio das Antas; Referee: João Ferreira

16 February 2002 23	Vitória de Setúbal	1–4	Porto	Setúbal
WEST (UTC+1)	Sousa (yellow card) 44'	Report	Costinha (yellow card) 12' (goal) 79'; André 18' (o.g.); Silva (yellow card) 43'; Söderström (yellow card) 62'; Capucho (yellow card) 85'; Postiga 86', 89'	Stadium: Estádio do Bonfim; Referee: Olegário Benquerença

23 February 2002 24	Porto	2–3	Beira-Mar	Porto
WEST (UTC+1)	Andrade (red card) 25'; Deco (yellow card) 25' (yellow-red card) 74'; Alenichev (yellow card) 29'; Clayton (yellow card) 41'; McCarthy 42'; Silva (yellow card) 52'; Costa (yellow card) 74'; Paredes 81'	Report	Cristiano 27'; Levato (yellow card) 47'; Fary Faye 50', 85'; Gamboa (yellow card) 71'; Santos (yellow card) 83'; Juninho Petrolina (yellow card) 88'; Alves (yellow card) 89'	Stadium: Estádio das Antas; Referee: Carlos Xistra

3 March 2002 25	Salgueiros	0–3	Porto	Porto
WEST (UTC+1)	McCarthy 10', 50' (yellow card) 45'; Paredes 37'	Report	Ferreira (yellow card) 45'	Stadium: Estádio Engenheiro Vidal Pinheiro; Referee: Pedro Henriques

8 March 2002 26	Belenenses	3–0	Porto	Lisbon
WEST (UTC+1)	Peixoto (yellow card) 2'; Wilson (yellow card) 3'; Verona 27'; Peixoto 72'; Cafú 88'	Report	Söderström (yellow card) 14'; Andrade (yellow card) 14'; Deco (yellow card) 68'; Postiga (red card) 89'	Stadium: Estádio do Restelo; Referee: João Ferreira

16 March 2002 27	Porto	0–0	Alverca	Porto
WEST (UTC+1)	Pavlin (yellow card) 34'; Costinha (yellow card) 62'	Report	Neves (yellow card) 45' (yellow-red card) 74'	Stadium: Estádio das Antas; Referee: José Pratas

24 March 2002 28	União de Leiria	1–1	Porto	Leiria
WEST (UTC+1)	Silas (yellow card) 36'; Jaques (yellow card) 38'; Maciel 47'; Pereira (yellow card) 62'; Bilro (yellow card) 66'; João Manuel (yellow card) 70'; Freddy (yellow card) 90'	Report	Joca (yellow card) 8'; Postiga 14' (yellow card) 54'; Andrade (yellow card) 28'; Paredes (yellow card) 73'	Stadium: Estádio Dr. Magalhães Pessoa; Referee: Isidoro Rodrigues

30 March 2002 29	Porto	2–1	Gil Vicente	Porto
WEST (UTC+1)	Paredes (yellow card) 34'; Carvalho (yellow card) 54'; Costa 66'; Alenichev (yellow card) 82'; Postiga 84'	Report	Joca (yellow card) 37' (yellow-red card) 76'; Afonso (yellow card) 39'; Martins (yellow card) 45'; Fernandes 49'; Nilton (yellow card) 78'	Stadium: Estádio das Antas; Referee: Vítor Melo Pereira

6 April 2002 30	Farense	0–3	Porto	Faro
WEST (UTC+1)	Nader (yellow card) 18' (red card) 19'; Mijanović (yellow card) 19' (red card) 43'; Gomes (yellow card) 37'; Ferreira (yellow card) 61'	Report	Carvalho (yellow card) 6'; Clayton 12', 51'; Deco (yellow card) 23'; Alenichev 64'	Stadium: Estádio de São Luís; Referee: Bruno Paixão

13 April 2002 31	Porto	3–0	Vitória de Guimarães	Porto
WEST (UTC+1)	McCarthy 13', 22'; Andrade (yellow card) 35'; Costinha (yellow card) 45'; Deco 90'	Report	Matias (yellow card) 61'; Cléber (yellow card) 87'	Stadium: Estádio das Antas; Referee: Paulo Baptista

20 April 2002 32	Braga	0–4	Porto	Braga
WEST (UTC+1)	Riva (yellow card) 26'; Esteves (yellow card) 27'; Miguel (red card) 71'	Report	Capucho (yellow card) 28'; McCarthy 33', 39', 74' (yellow card) 72'; Paredes (yellow card) 41'; Deco (yellow card) 55'; Postiga 89'	Stadium: Estádio Primeiro de Maio; Referee: Paulo Costa

27 April 2002 33	Porto	5–3	Santa Clara	Porto
WEST (UTC+1)	McCarthy 38', 60', 75' (yellow card) 75' (yellow-red card) 81'; Deco 49', 54'; Söderström (yellow card) 59'; Secretário (yellow card) 62'; Costinha (yellow card) 78'	Report	Toñito 35'; Figueiredo (yellow card) 44'; Cortés 45'; Nunes (yellow card) 53' (yellow-red card) 76'; Vayer 57'; Morales (red card) 78'; Galvão (yellow card) 80'; Sandro (yellow card) 83'; Kali (yellow card) 86'	Stadium: Estádio das Antas; Referee: Martins dos Santos

5 May 2002 34	Paços de Ferreira	1–2	Porto	Paços de Ferreira
WEST (UTC+1)	Everaldo (yellow card) 31'; Leonardo 45'; Zé Manel (yellow card) 64'	Report	Carvalho (yellow card) 26'; Deco 38' (yellow card) 44'; McCarthy 46'; Secretário (yellow card) 64'; Alenichev (yellow card) 72'	Stadium: Estádio da Mata Real; Referee: José Pratas

=== Taça de Portugal ===
17 November 2001 Fourth round	Porto (I)	3–0	Estrela da Amadora (II)	Porto
WEST (UTC+1)	Söderström 13'; Esnáider 18'; Clayton 59'			Stadium: Estádio das Antas; Referee: Elmano Santos

12 December 2001 Fifth round	Porto (I)	2–1 (a.e.t.)	Santa Clara (I)	Porto
WEST (UTC+1)	Paredes 81'; Postiga 105'		Vieira 84'; Toñito (yellow card) 105'	Stadium: Estádio das Antas; Referee: Augusto Duarte

29 December 2001 Sixth round	Académico de Viseu (III)	0–4	Porto (I)	Viseu
WEST (UTC+1)	Amorim (yellow card) 16'; Sousa (yellow card) 59'; Zé Duarte (yellow card) 78'		McCarthy 6'; Deco (yellow card) 33'; Postiga 43', 71'; Secretário (yellow card) 75'; Clayton 76'	Stadium: Estádio do Fontelo; Referee: Mário Mendes

16 January 2002 Quarter-finals	Porto (I)	1–2	Braga (I)	Porto
WEST (UTC+1)	Capucho 51'; Silva (yellow card) 57'; Söderström (yellow card) 67'; Secretário (yellow card) 72'; Rafael (yellow card) 81'		Lima (yellow card) 39' (yellow-red card) 89'; Castanheira (yellow card) 61' (goal) 71'; Idalécio 74'	Stadium: Estádio das Antas; Referee: Vítor Pereira

=== UEFA Champions League ===
==== Second qualifying round ====
25 July 2001 First leg	Porto (Portugal)	8–0	(Wales) Barry Town	Porto, Portugal
22:30 WEST (UTC+1)	Pena 12', 51', 52', 72'; Deco 22' (pen.), 23' (pen.), 43'; Söderström 41'	Report	Evans (yellow card) 21'; Staton (yellow card) 79'	Stadium: Estádio das Antas; Attendance: 43,050; Referee: Georgios Kasnaferis (Greece)

1 August 2001 Second leg	Barry Town (Wales)	3–1 (3–9 agg.)	(Portugal) Porto	Barry, Wales
20:30 WEST (UTC+1)	Phillips 37'; Flynn 39'; Lloyd 89' (pen.)	Report	Rafael 17'; Postiga (yellow card) 88'	Stadium: Jenner Park Stadium; Attendance: 2,377; Referee: Dani Koren (Israel)

==== Third qualifying round ====
8 August 2001 First leg	Porto (Portugal)	2–2	(Switzerland) Grasshopper	Porto, Portugal
22:00 WEST (UTC+1)	Paredes 6'; Clayton (yellow card) 29'; Costa (yellow card) 48'; Postiga 59'	Report	Spycher (yellow card) 45'; Núñez 50'; Petrić 57'; Castillo (yellow card) 89'	Stadium: Estádio das Antas; Attendance: 46,142; Referee: Ľuboš Micheľ (Slovakia)

22 August 2001 Second leg	Grasshopper (Switzerland)	2–3 (4–5 agg.)	(Portugal) Porto	Zurich, Switzerland
20:15 WEST (UTC+1)	Castillo (yellow card) 7'; Schwegler (yellow card) 19'; Diop (red card) 66'; Tararache (yellow card) 67'; Chapuisat 87'	Report	Clayton 14'; Capucho 43'; Söderström (yellow card) 45'; Deco 80'	Stadium: Hardturm; Attendance: 16,066; Referee: Stuart Dougal (Scotland)

==== First group stage ====
Pos	Team	Pld	W	D	L	GF	GA	GD	Pts	Qualification
1	(Italy) Juventus	6	3	2	1	11	8	+3	11	Advance to second group stage
2	(Portugal) Porto	6	3	1	2	7	5	+2	10	Advance to second group stage
3	(Scotland) Celtic	6	3	0	3	8	11	−3	9	Transfer to UEFA Cup
4	(Norway) Rosenborg	6	1	1	4	4	6	−2	4	

Source: RSSSF

18 September 2001 1	Rosenborg (Norway)	1–2	(Portugal) Porto	Trondheim, Norway
20:45 WEST (UTC+1)	Brattbakk (yellow card) 6'; Rushfeldt 90+2'	Report	Pena 10'; Costa (yellow card) 31'; Deco 60'; Silva (yellow card) 87'; Andrade (yellow card) 90+1'; Postiga (yellow card) 90+3'	Stadium: Lerkendal Stadion; Attendance: 20,007; Referee: Graham Barber (England)

25 September 2001 2	Celtic (Scotland)	1–0	(Portugal) Porto	Glasgow, Scotland
20:45 WEST (UTC+1)	Larsson 36'	Report	Ibarra (yellow card) 62'	Stadium: Celtic Park; Attendance: 54,650; Referee: Dick Jol (Netherlands)

10 October 2001 3	Porto (Portugal)	0–0	(Italy) Juventus	Porto, Portugal
20:45 WEST (UTC+1)	Carvalho (yellow card) 52'; Deco (yellow card) 86'	Report	Tudor (yellow card) 19'; Paramatti (yellow card) 56'; Del Piero (yellow card) 63'	Stadium: Estádio das Antas; Attendance: 40,228; Referee: Manuel Mejuto González (Spain)

17 October 2001 4	Porto (Portugal)	3–0	(Scotland) Celtic	Porto, Portugal
20:45 WEST (UTC+1)	Clayton 1', 61' (yellow card) 19'; Costinha (yellow card) 10'; Silva 45+1'	Report		Stadium: Estádio das Antas; Attendance: 30,313; Referee: René Temmink (Netherlands)

23 October 2001 5	Juventus (Italy)	3–1	(Portugal) Porto	Turin, Italy
20:45 WEST (UTC+1)	Del Piero 32'; Montero 47'; Davids (yellow card) 71'; Trezeguet 73'	Report	Clayton 13'; Costinha (yellow card) 69'; Postiga (yellow card) 90+2'	Stadium: Stadio Delle Alpi; Attendance: 38,328; Referee: Anders Frisk (Sweden)

31 October 2001 6	Porto (Portugal)	1–0	(Norway) Rosenborg	Porto, Portugal
20:45 WEST (UTC+1)	Pena 37'; Silva (yellow card) 89'	Report	Strand (yellow card) 68'	Stadium: Estádio das Antas; Attendance: 31,429; Referee: Hartmut Strampe (Germany)

==== Second group stage ====
Pos	Team	Pld	W	D	L	GF	GA	GD	Pts	Qualification
1	(Spain) Real Madrid	6	5	1	0	14	5	+9	16	Advance to knockout stage
2	(Greece) Panathinaikos	6	2	2	2	7	8	−1	8	Advance to knockout stage
3	(Czech Republic) Sparta Prague	6	2	0	4	6	10	−4	6	
4	(Portugal) Porto	6	1	1	4	3	7	−4	4	

Source: RSSSF

21 November 2001 1	Panathinaikos (Greece)	0–0	(Portugal) Porto	Athens, Greece
20:45 WEST (UTC+1)		Report	Paredes (yellow card) 31'; Costinha (yellow card) 37'; Pena (yellow card) 86'; Santos (yellow card) 90+3'	Stadium: Leoforos Alexandras Stadium; Attendance: 15,208; Referee: Graham Poll (England)

4 December 2001 2	Porto (Portugal)	0–1	(Czech Republic) Sparta Prague	Porto, Portugal
20:45 WEST (UTC+1)		Report	Hübschman (yellow card) 56'; Sionko 75'; Kincl (yellow card) 90+2'	Stadium: Estádio das Antas; Attendance: 25,766; Referee: Nikolai Levnikov (Russia)

19 February 2002 3	Real Madrid (Spain)	1–0	(Portugal) Porto	Madrid, Spain
20:45 WEST (UTC+1)	Helguera (yellow card) 39'; Carlos (yellow card) 63'; Solari 83'; Munitis (yellow card) 90'	Report	Capucho (yellow card) 58'; Secretário (yellow card) 59'	Stadium: Santiago Bernabéu; Attendance: 59,000; Referee: Markus Merk (Germany)

27 February 2002 4	Porto (Portugal)	1–2	(Spain) Real Madrid	Porto, Portugal
20:45 WEST (UTC+1)	Capucho 28'; Pavlin (yellow card) 40'; Paredes (yellow card) 71'; Silva (yellow card) 90'	Report	Solari 7'; Helguera 20'; Pavón (yellow card) 32'; Munitis (yellow card) 75'	Stadium: Estádio das Antas; Attendance: 34,700; Referee: Pierluigi Collina (Italy)

12 March 2002 5	Porto (Portugal)	2–1	(Greece) Panathinaikos	Porto, Portugal
20:45 WEST (UTC+1)	Söderström (yellow card) 10'; Deco 12'; Pena 54'; Secretário (red card) 79'	Report	Basinas (yellow card) 38'; Kyrgiakos (yellow card) 61'; Kolkka 65' (yellow card) 78'	Stadium: Estádio das Antas; Attendance: 12,835; Referee: Ľuboš Micheľ (Slovakia)

20 March 2002 6	Sparta Prague (Czech Republic)	2–0	(Portugal) Porto	Prague, Czech Republic
20:45 WEST (UTC+1)	Sionko 63'; Jarošík 71'; Mareš (yellow card) 73'; Čížek (yellow card) 79'	Report	Clayton (yellow card) 31'; Costinha (yellow card) 55'	Stadium: AXA Arena; Attendance: 10,521; Referee: Wolfgang Stark (Germany)

=== Supertaça Cândido de Oliveira ===
4 August 2001	Boavista	0–1	Porto	Vila do Conde
21:00 WEST (UTC+1)	Frechaut (yellow card) 2' (yellow-red card) 86'; Quevedo (yellow card) 68'		Clayton (yellow card) 24'; Paredes (yellow card) 34'; Pena (yellow card) 44'; Andrade 53' (yellow card) 86'; Júnior (yellow card) 69'	Stadium: Estádio do Rio Ave FC; Referee: Martins dos Santos

== Top scorers ==
=== Primeira Liga ===
- (Portugal) Deco 13
- (South Africa) Benni McCarthy 12
- (Portugal) Hélder Postiga 9
