= 2001–02 UEFA Champions League qualifying rounds =

European football tournament

The qualifying rounds for the 2001–02 UEFA Champions League began on 11 July 2001. In total, there were three qualifying rounds which provided 16 clubs to join the group stage.

Times are CEST (UTC+2), as listed by UEFA.

== Teams ==
Key to colours
Qualify for the group stage
Eliminated in the Third qualifying round; Advanced to the UEFA Cup first round

Third qualifying round
Team	Coeff.
(Spain) Barcelona	108.604
(Italy) Lazio	105.119
(Italy) Parma	81.119
(England) Liverpool	73.643
(Germany) Borussia Dortmund	73.315
(Spain) Mallorca	60.604
(Germany) Bayer Leverkusen	56.315
(Ukraine) Dynamo Kyiv	55.915
(Netherlands) Ajax	55.123
(Russia) Lokomotiv Moscow	53.853
(Norway) Rosenborg	53.799
(Czech Republic) Slavia Prague	50.395
(Greece) Panathinaikos	37.183
(Switzerland) Grasshopper	28.936
(Scotland) Celtic	25.310
(Turkey) Fenerbahçe	24.987
(France) Lille	21.175
(Austria) Tirol Innsbruck	17.873

Second qualifying round
Team	Coeff.
(Turkey) Galatasaray	71.987
(Portugal) Porto	68.136
(Belgium) Anderlecht	43.075
(Scotland) Rangers	38.310
(Romania) Steaua București	26.894
(Norway) Brann	21.799
(Ukraine) Shakhtar Donetsk	20.915
(Federal Republic of Yugoslavia) Red Star Belgrade	19.707
(Denmark) Copenhagen	18.587
(Poland) Wisła Kraków	16.749
(Sweden) Halmstads BK	16.103
(Hungary) Ferencváros	15.541
(Slovakia) Inter Slovnaft Bratislava	15.332
(Israel) Maccabi Haifa	15.061
(Croatia) Hajduk Split	11.998
(Slovenia) Maribor	10.998
(Switzerland) Lugano	10.936
(Cyprus) Omonia	5.415

First qualifying round
Team	Coeff.
(Bulgaria) Levski Sofia	9.831
(Latvia) Skonto	8.915
(Georgia (country)) Torpedo Kutaisi	4.833
(Finland) Haka	4.270
(Iceland) KR	3.665
(Republic of Ireland) Bohemians	3.498
(Belarus) Slavia Mozyr	3.416
(Moldova) Sheriff Tiraspol	2.249
(Lithuania) Kaunas	2.248
(Wales) Barry Town	2.082
(North Macedonia) Sloga Jugomagnat	1.748
(Estonia) Levadia Maardu	1.248
(Armenia) Araks-Impeks	1.081
(Azerbaijan) Shamkir	0.832
(Malta) Valletta	0.831
(Northern Ireland) Linfield	0.664
(Bosnia and Herzegovina) Željezničar	0.500
(Luxembourg) F91 Dudelange	0.332
(Faroe Islands) VB	0.332
(Albania) Vllaznia	0.249

== First qualifying round ==
The draw for this round was performed on 22 June 2001 in Geneva, Switzerland.

=== Seeding ===
Seeded	Unseeded
(Bulgaria) Levski Sofia (Latvia) Skonto (Georgia (country)) Torpedo Kutaisi (Finland) Haka (Iceland) KR (Republic of Ireland) Bohemians (Belarus) Slavia Mozyr (Moldova) Sheriff Tiraspol (Lithuania) Kaunas (Wales) Barry Town	(North Macedonia) Sloga Jugomagnat (Estonia) Levadia Maardu (Armenia) Araks-Impeks (Azerbaijan) Shamkir (Malta) Valletta (Northern Ireland) Linfield (Bosnia and Herzegovina) Željezničar (Luxembourg) F91 Dudelange (Faroe Islands) VB (Albania) Vllaznia

=== Summary ===
Team 1	Agg.	Team 2	1st leg	2nd leg
Araks-Impeks (Armenia)	0–3	(Moldova) Sheriff Tiraspol	0–1	0–2
Linfield (Northern Ireland)	0–1	(Georgia (country)) Torpedo Kutaisi	0–0	0–1
Bohemians (Republic of Ireland)	3–0	(Estonia) Levadia Maardu	3–0	0–0
F91 Dudelange (Luxembourg)	2–6	(Latvia) Skonto	1–6	1–0
Levski Sofia (Bulgaria)	4–0	(Bosnia and Herzegovina) Željezničar	4–0	0–0
VB (Faroe Islands)	0–5	(Belarus) Slavia Mozyr	0–0	0–5
Valletta (Malta)	0–5	(Finland) Haka	0–0	0–5
Sloga Jugomagnat (North Macedonia)	1–1 (a)	(Lithuania) Kaunas	0–0	1–1
KR (Iceland)	2–2 (a)	(Albania) Vllaznia	2–1	0–1
Barry Town (Wales)	3–0	(Azerbaijan) Shamkir	2–0	1–0

=== Matches ===
11 July 2001
17:00

Araks-Impeks (Armenia)	0–1	(Moldova) Sheriff Tiraspol
	Report	Barburoș 60'

Vazgen Sargsyan Republican Stadium, Yerevan (Note: Araks-Impeks played their home match at Vazgen Sargsyan Republican Stadium in Yerevan, as their regular home venue Ayg Stadium in Ararat did not meet UEFA criteria.)
Attendance: 9,700
Referee: Athanassios Briakos (Greece)
18 July 2001
17:00

Sheriff Tiraspol (Moldova)	2–0	(Armenia) Araks-Impeks
Camleonoc 12'; Dadu 90'	Report

Stadionul Municipal, Tiraspol
Attendance: 4,800
Referee: Nikolai Ivanov (Russia)

Sheriff Tiraspol won 3–0 on aggregate.

11 July 2001
18:00

Linfield (Northern Ireland)	0–0	(Georgia (country)) Torpedo Kutaisi
	Report

Windsor Park, Belfast
Attendance: 2,699
Referee: Jouni Hyytiä (Finland)
18 July 2001
18:00

Torpedo Kutaisi (Georgia (country))	1–0	(Northern Ireland) Linfield
Ashvetia 70'	Report

Givi Kiladze Stadium, Kutaisi
Attendance: 7,130
Referee: Jack van Hulten (Netherlands)

Torpedo Kutaisi won 1–0 on aggregate.

11 July 2001
20:45

Bohemians (Republic of Ireland)	3–0	(Estonia) Levadia Maardu
Maher 2'; Crowe 10', 56' (pen.)	Report

Dalymount Park, Dublin
Attendance: 3,832
Referee: Dieter Schoch (Switzerland)
18 July 2001
17:30

Levadia Maardu (Estonia)	0–0	(Republic of Ireland) Bohemians
	Report

Lilleküla Stadium, Tallinn
Attendance: 1,034
Referee: Knud Stadsgaard (Denmark)

Bohemians won 3–0 on aggregate.

11 July 2001
20:00

F91 Dudelange (Luxembourg)	1–6	(Latvia) Skonto
Cicchirillo 43'	Report	Verpakovskis 2'; Miholaps 60', 75'; Koļesņičenko 65', 85'; Zemļinskis 71' (pen.)

Stade Josy Barthel, Luxembourg City (Note: F91 Dudelange played their home match at Stade Josy Barthel in Luxembourg City, instead of their regular venue Stade Jos Nosbaum in Dudelange.)
Attendance: 1,068
Referee: Marian Salomir (Romania)
18 July 2001
17:30

Skonto (Latvia)	0–1	(Luxembourg) F91 Dudelange
	Report	Cicchirillo 77'

Skonto Stadium, Riga
Attendance: 1,500
Referee: Jon Skjervold (Norway)

Skonto won 6–2 on aggregate.

11 July 2001
19:00

Levski Sofia (Bulgaria)	4–0	(Bosnia and Herzegovina) Željezničar
Terziev 7'; G. Ivanov 20', 73' (pen.); Markov 28'	Report

Georgi Asparuhov Stadium, Sofia
Attendance: 16,121
Referee: Dougie McDonald (Scotland)
18 July 2001
20:15

Željezničar (Bosnia and Herzegovina)	0–0	(Bulgaria) Levski Sofia
	Report

Koševo City Stadium, Sarajevo
Attendance: 3,000
Referee: Bruno Derrien (France)

Levski Sofia won 4–0 on aggregate.

11 July 2001
20:00

VB (Faroe Islands)	0–0	(Belarus) Slavia Mozyr
	Report

Tórsvøllur, Tórshavn (Note: VB played their home match at Tórsvøllur stadium in Tórshavn, instead of their regular home venue Á Eiðinum stadium in Vágur.)
Attendance: 540
Referee: David Malcolm (Northern Ireland)
18 July 2001
17:00

Slavia Mozyr (Belarus)	5–0	(Faroe Islands) VB
Wierzbicki 4' (o.g.); Strypeykis 12', 27' (pen.), 31'; Rybakov 23'	Report

Yunost Stadium, Mozyr
Attendance: 2,150
Referee: John McDermott (Republic of Ireland)

Slavia Mozyr won 5–0 on aggregate.

11 July 2001
20:00

Valletta (Malta)	0–0	(Finland) Haka
	Report

Ta' Qali National Stadium, Ta' Qali
Attendance: 1,726
Referee: Paul McKeon (Republic of Ireland)
18 July 2001
18:00

Haka (Finland)	5–0	(Malta) Valletta
Torkkeli 4'; Kovács 15', 22', 28'; Pogioli 90'	Report

Tehtaan kenttä, Valkeakoski
Attendance: 2,423
Referee: Miroslav Liba (Czech Republic)

Haka won 5–0 on aggregate.

11 July 2001
20:00

Sloga Jugomagnat (North Macedonia)	0–0	(Lithuania) Kaunas
	Report

Philip II Arena, Skopje (Note: Sloga Jugomagnat played their home matches at Philip II Arena in Skopje, instead of their regular home venue Čair Stadium.)
Attendance: 2,538
Referee: Franz-Xaver Wack (Germany)
18 July 2001
17:30

Kaunas (Lithuania)	1–1	(North Macedonia) Sloga Jugomagnat
Papečkys 65'	Report	Nuhiji 52'

Darius and Girėnas Stadium, Kaunas
Attendance: 660
Referee: Eric Blareau (Belgium)

1–1 on aggregate; Sloga Jugomagnat won on away goals.

11 July 2001
22:00

KR (Iceland)	2–1	(Albania) Vllaznia
Benediktsson 63'; Ólafsson 78'	Report	Duro 17'

Laugardalsvöllur, Reykjavík (Note: KR played their home match at Laugardalsvöllur in Reykjavík, instead of their regular venue KR-völlur in Reykjavík.)
Attendance: 1,373
Referee: Bernhard Brugger (Austria)
18 July 2001
20:00

Vllaznia (Albania)	1–0	(Iceland) KR
Duro 62'	Report

Qemal Stafa Stadium, Tirana (Note: Vllaznia played their home matches at Qemal Stafa Stadium in Tirana, as their regular venue Loro Boriçi Stadium in Shkodër was closed for renovation.)
Attendance: 5,000
Referee: Alon Yefet (Israel)

2–2 on aggregate; Vllaznia won on away goals.

11 July 2001
20:30

Barry Town (Wales)	2–0	(Azerbaijan) Shamkir
York 63'; French 68'	Report

Jenner Park Stadium, Barry
Attendance: 1,992
Referee: Darko Čeferin (Slovenia)
18 July 2001
16:00

Shamkir (Azerbaijan)	0–1	(Wales) Barry Town
	Report	Phillips 58'

Tofiq Bahramov Republican Stadium, Baku (Note: Shamkir played their home match at Tofiq Bahramov Republican Stadium in Baku, instead of their regular venue Shamkir City Stadium in Şəmkir.)
Attendance: 12,000
Referee: Dietmar Drabek (Austria)

Barry Town won 3–0 on aggregate.

== Second qualifying round ==
The draw for this round was performed on 22 June 2001 in Geneva, Switzerland.

=== Seeding ===
Seeded		Unseeded	
(Turkey) Galatasaray (Portugal) Porto (Belgium) Anderlecht (Scotland) Rangers (Romania) Steaua București (Norway) Brann (Ukraine) Shakhtar Donetsk	(Federal Republic of Yugoslavia) Red Star Belgrade (Denmark) Copenhagen (Poland) Wisła Kraków (Sweden) Halmstads BK (Slovakia) Inter Slovnaft Bratislava (Israel) Maccabi Haifa (Croatia) Hajduk Split	(Slovenia) Maribor (Switzerland) Lugano (Bulgaria) Levski Sofia (Latvia) Skonto (Cyprus) Omonia (Georgia (country)) Torpedo Kutaisi (Finland) Haka	(Albania) Vllaznia (Republic of Ireland) Bohemians (Belarus) Slavia Mozyr (Moldova) Sheriff Tiraspol (North Macedonia) Sloga Jugomagnat (Wales) Barry Town (Hungary) Ferencváros

Notes

1. ^{†} Winners of the previous qualifying round whose identity was not known at the time of the draw. Teams in italics defeated a team with a higher coefficient in the previous qualifying round, thus effectively taking the coefficient of their defeated opponent in the draw for this round.
2. ^{‡} Hungarian champions Ferencváros were treated as unseeded club by default for second qualifying round as the 2000–01 Nemzeti Bajnokság I was not finished by the date of the draw (22 June 2001).

=== Summary ===
Team 1	Agg.	Team 2	1st leg	2nd leg
Haka (Finland)	3–1	(Israel) Maccabi Haifa	0–1	3–0 (Note: UEFA awarded Haka a 3–0 win due to Maccabi Haifa fielding suspended player Walid Badir in the second leg. The original match had ended in a 4–0 win for Maccabi Haifa.)
Shakhtar Donetsk (Ukraine)	4–2	(Switzerland) Lugano	3–0	1–2
Omonia (Cyprus)	2–3	(Federal Republic of Yugoslavia) Red Star Belgrade	1–1	1–2
Ferencváros (Hungary)	0–0 (4–5 p)	(Croatia) Hajduk Split	0–0	0–0 (a.e.t.)
Porto (Portugal)	9–3	(Wales) Barry Town	8–0	1–3
Maribor (Slovenia)	1–6	(Scotland) Rangers	0–3	1–3
Galatasaray (Turkey)	6–1	(Albania) Vllaznia	2–0	4–1
Slavia Mozyr (Belarus)	0–2	(Slovakia) Inter Slovnaft Bratislava	0–1	0–1
Anderlecht (Belgium)	6–1	(Moldova) Sheriff Tiraspol	4–0	2–1
Torpedo Kutaisi (Georgia (country))	2–4	(Denmark) Copenhagen	1–1	1–3
Levski Sofia (Bulgaria)	1–1 (a)	(Norway) Brann	0–0	1–1
Skonto (Latvia)	1–3	(Poland) Wisła Kraków	1–2	0–1
Bohemians (Republic of Ireland)	1–4	(Sweden) Halmstads BK	1–2	0–2
Steaua București (Romania)	5–1	(North Macedonia) Sloga Jugomagnat	3–0	2–1

=== Matches ===
24 July 2001
19:00

Haka (Finland)	0–1	(Israel) Maccabi Haifa
	Report	Zano 28' (pen.)

Tehtaan kenttä, Valkeakoski
Attendance: 3,355
Referee: Dermot Gallagher (England)
1 August 2001
17:50

Maccabi Haifa (Israel)	0–3 Awarded (Note: The second leg originally ended 4–0 to Maccabi Haifa but they were later ruled to have forfeited the match after fielding suspended player Walid Badir; Haka were therefore awarded the second leg 3–0.)	(Finland) Haka
Rosso 39'; Katan 57', 78', 90'	Report

Kiryat Eliezer Stadium, Haifa
Attendance: 8,000
Referee: Zoran Arsić (FR Yugoslavia)

Haka won 3–1 on aggregate.

25 July 2001
18:00

Shakhtar Donetsk (Ukraine)	3–0	(Switzerland) Lugano
Bakharev 21'; Tymoshchuk 57'; Vorobey 65'	Report

Shakhtar Stadium, Donetsk
Attendance: 31,714
Referee: Roy Helge Olsen (Norway)
31 July 2001
20:15

Lugano (Switzerland)	2–1	(Ukraine) Shakhtar Donetsk
Gaspoz 53'; Rossi 66'	Report	Aghahowa 13'

Cornaredo Stadium, Lugano
Attendance: 3,300
Referee: Juan Ansuátegui Roca (Spain)

Shakhtar Donetsk won 4–2 on aggregate.

25 July 2001
19:00

Omonia (Cyprus)	1–1	(Federal Republic of Yugoslavia) Red Star Belgrade
Thiebaut 70'	Report	Pjanović 30'

GSP Stadium, Nicosia
Attendance: 16,756
Referee: Eduardo Iturralde González (Spain)
1 August 2001
20:00

Red Star Belgrade (Federal Republic of Yugoslavia)	2–1	(Cyprus) Omonia
Lerinc 53'; Ačimovič 79'	Report	Kaiafas 71'

Red Star Stadium, Belgrade
Attendance: 18,145
Referee: Lutz Michael Fröhlich (Germany)

Red Star Belgrade won 3–2 on aggregate.

25 July 2001
20:15

Ferencváros (Hungary)	0–0	(Croatia) Hajduk Split
	Report

Stadion Albert Flórián, Budapest
Attendance: 9,259
Referee: Mikko Vuorela (Finland)
1 August 2001
20:15

Hajduk Split (Croatia)	0–0 (a.e.t.)	(Hungary) Ferencváros
	Report
Penalties
Asanović (penalty scored); Srna (penalty missed); Carević (penalty scored); Deranja (penalty scored); Štimac (penalty scored); Musa (penalty scored)	5–4	(penalty missed) Alex Arruda; (penalty scored) Pinte; (penalty scored) Szkukalek; (penalty scored) Lipcsei; (penalty scored) Vén; (penalty missed) Dragóner

Stadion Poljud, Split
Attendance: 26,400
Referee: Orhan Erdemir (Turkey)

0–0 on aggregate; Hajduk Split won 5–4 on penalties.

25 July 2001
22:30

Porto (Portugal)	8–0	(Wales) Barry Town
Pena 12', 51', 52', 72'; Deco 22' (pen.), 23' (pen.), 43'; Söderström 41'	Report

Estádio das Antas, Porto
Attendance: 43,050
Referee: Georgios Kasnaferis (Greece)
1 August 2001
20:30

Barry Town (Wales)	3–1	(Portugal) Porto
Phillips 37'; Flynn 39'; Lloyd 89' (pen.)	Report	Rafael 17'

Jenner Park Stadium, Barry
Attendance: 2,377
Referee: Dani Koren (Israel)

Porto won 9–3 on aggregate.

25 July 2001
20:35

Maribor (Slovenia)	0–3	(Scotland) Rangers
	Report	Flo 38', 73' (pen.); Nerlinger 56'

Ljudski vrt, Maribor
Attendance: 6,100
Referee: Mario van der Ende (Netherlands)
1 August 2001
20:45

Rangers (Scotland)	3–1	(Slovenia) Maribor
Flo 55'; Caniggia 58', 71'	Report	Starčevič 16'

Ibrox Stadium, Glasgow
Attendance: 50,045
Referee: Jorge Coroado (Portugal)

Rangers won 6–1 on aggregate.

25 July 2001
19:45

Galatasaray (Turkey)	2–0	(Albania) Vllaznia
Ümit Karan 18'; Kaya 90+4'	Report

Ali Sami Yen Stadium, Istanbul
Attendance: 14,804
Referee: Paulo Paraty (Portugal)
1 August 2001
20:00

Vllaznia (Albania)	1–4	(Turkey) Galatasaray
Sinani 33'	Report	Ümit Karan 38'; Arif Erdem 49'; Hasan Şaş 73'; Serkan Aykut 80'

Qemal Stafa Stadium, Tirana
Attendance: 4,600
Referee: Mike Riley (England)

Galatasaray won 6–1 on aggregate.

25 July 2001
17:00

Slavia Mozyr (Belarus)	0–1	(Slovakia) Inter Slovnaft Bratislava
	Report	Kunzo 43'

Yunost Stadium, Mozyr
Attendance: 2,420
Referee: Steve Dunn (England)
1 August 2001
19:00

Inter Slovnaft Bratislava (Slovakia)	1–0	(Belarus) Slavia Mozyr
Lembakoali 73'	Report

Štadión Pasienky, Bratislava
Attendance: 2,500
Referee: Edo Trivković (Croatia)

Inter Slovnaft Bratislava won 2–0 on aggregate.

25 July 2001
20:00

Anderlecht (Belgium)	4–0	(Moldova) Sheriff Tiraspol
Crasson 18', 81'; De Boeck 41', 65'	Report

Constant Vanden Stock Stadium, Brussels
Attendance: 21,055
Referee: Tomasz Mikulski (Poland)
1 August 2001
16:30

Sheriff Tiraspol (Moldova)	1–2	(Belgium) Anderlecht
Boreț 4'	Report	Yaschuk 28' (pen.); De Boeck 59'

Stadionul Municipal, Tiraspol
Attendance: 4,498
Referee: Martin Hansson (Sweden)

Anderlecht won 6–1 on aggregate.

25 July 2001
18:00

Torpedo Kutaisi (Georgia (country))	1–1	(Denmark) Copenhagen
Ashvetia 77'	Report	Zuma 43'

Givi Kiladze Stadium, Kutaisi
Attendance: 11,500
Referee: Frank De Bleeckere (Belgium)
1 August 2001
19:00

Copenhagen (Denmark)	3–1	(Georgia (country)) Torpedo Kutaisi
Zuma 45+2'; Lønstrup 59'; Fernandez 74'	Report	Kutateladze 90+3'

Parken Stadium, Copenhagen
Attendance: 14,345
Referee: Pascal Garibian (France)

Copenhagen won 4–2 on aggregate.

25 July 2001
19:00

Levski Sofia (Bulgaria)	0–0	(Norway) Brann
	Report

Georgi Asparuhov Stadium, Sofia
Attendance: 13,780
Referee: Stefano Farina (Italy)
1 August 2001
20:45

Brann (Norway)	1–1	(Bulgaria) Levski Sofia
Walltin 16'	Report	Ivanov 5'

Brann Stadion, Bergen
Attendance: 10,902
Referee: Jacek Granat (Poland)

1–1 on aggregate; Levski Sofia won on away goals.

25 July 2001
17:30

Skonto (Latvia)	1–2	(Poland) Wisła Kraków
Korgalidze 78'	Report	Głowacki 48'; Żurawski 80' (pen.)

Daugava Stadium, Riga (Note: Skonto played their Second qualifying round home match at Daugava Stadium in Riga, instead of their regular venue Skonto Stadium.)
Attendance: 2,000
Referee: Leif Sundell (Sweden)
1 August 2001
17:30

Wisła Kraków (Poland)	1–0	(Latvia) Skonto
Żurawski 85'	Report

Stadion Miejski, Kraków
Attendance: 4,500
Referee: Nicolai Vollquartz (Denmark)

Wisła Kraków won 3–1 on aggregate.

25 July 2001
20:45

Bohemians (Republic of Ireland)	1–2	(Sweden) Halmstads BK
Crowe 23'	Report	Jönsson 31'; Selaković 55'

Dalymount Park, Dublin
Attendance: 4,225
Referee: Erol Ersoy (Turkey)
1 August 2001
19:00

Halmstads BK (Sweden)	2–0	(Republic of Ireland) Bohemians
Jönsson 57'; Selaković 68'	Report

Örjans Vall, Halmstad
Attendance: 3,643
Referee: Ivan Dobrinov (Bulgaria)

Halmstads BK won 4–1 on aggregate.

25 July 2001
20:00

Steaua București (Romania)	3–0	(North Macedonia) Sloga Jugomagnat
Răducanu 1', 19'; Trică 82'	Report

Stadionul Steaua, Bucharest
Attendance: 9,200
Referee: Pasquale Rodomonti (Italy)
1 August 2001
20:00

Sloga Jugomagnat (North Macedonia)	1–2	(Romania) Steaua București
Nuhiji 86'	Report	Falemi 18'; Răducanu 41'

Philip II Arena, Skopje
Attendance: 462
Referee: Kristinn Jakobsson (Iceland)

Steaua București won 5–1 on aggregate.

== Third qualifying round ==
The draw for this round was performed on 20 July 2001 in Nyon, Switzerland.

=== Seeding ===
Seeded		Unseeded	
(Spain) Barcelona (Italy) Lazio (Italy) Parma (England) Liverpool (Germany) Borussia Dortmund (Turkey) Galatasaray (Portugal) Porto (Spain) Mallorca	(Germany) Bayer Leverkusen (Ukraine) Dynamo Kyiv (Netherlands) Ajax (Russia) Lokomotiv Moscow (Norway) Rosenborg (Czech Republic) Slavia Prague (Belgium) Anderlecht (Scotland) Rangers	(Greece) Panathinaikos (Switzerland) Grasshopper (Romania) Steaua București (Scotland) Celtic (Turkey) Fenerbahçe (Bulgaria) Levski Sofia (France) Lille (Ukraine) Shakhtar Donetsk	(Federal Republic of Yugoslavia) Red Star Belgrade (Denmark) Copenhagen (Austria) Tirol Innsbruck (Poland) Wisła Kraków (Sweden) Halmstads BK (Slovakia) Inter Slovnaft Bratislava (Finland) Haka (Croatia) Hajduk Split

Notes

1. ^{†} Winners of the previous qualifying round whose identity was not known at the time of the draw. Teams in italics defeated a team with a higher coefficient in the previous qualifying round, thus effectively taking the coefficient of their defeated opponent in the draw for this round.

=== Summary ===
Team 1	Agg.	Team 2	1st leg	2nd leg
Shakhtar Donetsk (Ukraine)	1–5	(Germany) Borussia Dortmund	0–2	1–3
Lokomotiv Moscow (Russia)	3–2	(Austria) Tirol Innsbruck	3–1	0–1 (Note: UEFA decided to replay the second leg (which originally ended in 1–0 win to Lokomotiv) after accepting Tirol's protest on refereeing mistake, which resulted in Lokomotiv player not being shown a red card after receiving a second yellow card.)
Steaua București (Romania)	3–5	(Ukraine) Dynamo Kyiv	2–4	1–1
Haka (Finland)	1–9	(England) Liverpool	0–5	1–4
Hajduk Split (Croatia)	1–2	(Spain) Mallorca	1–0	0–2 (a.e.t.)
Red Star Belgrade (Federal Republic of Yugoslavia)	0–3	(Germany) Bayer Leverkusen	0–0	0–3
Wisła Kraków (Poland)	3–5	(Spain) Barcelona	3–4	0–1
Copenhagen (Denmark)	3–5	(Italy) Lazio	2–1	1–4
Inter Slovnaft Bratislava (Slovakia)	3–7	(Norway) Rosenborg	3–3	0–4
Halmstads BK (Sweden)	3–4	(Belgium) Anderlecht	2–3	1–1
Slavia Prague (Czech Republic)	1–3	(Greece) Panathinaikos	1–2	0–1
Galatasaray (Turkey)	3–2	(Bulgaria) Levski Sofia	2–1	1–1
Ajax (Netherlands)	2–3	(Scotland) Celtic	1–3	1–0
Porto (Portugal)	5–4	(Switzerland) Grasshopper	2–2	3–2
Parma (Italy)	1–2	(France) Lille	0–2	1–0
Rangers (Scotland)	1–2	(Turkey) Fenerbahçe	0–0	1–2

=== Matches ===
7 August 2001
19:30

Shakhtar Donetsk (Ukraine)	0–2	(Germany) Borussia Dortmund
	Report	Ricken 35'; Oliseh 73'

Shakhtar Stadium, Donetsk
Attendance: 31,714
Referee: Knud Erik Fisker (Denmark)
22 August 2001
20:30

Borussia Dortmund (Germany)	3–1	(Ukraine) Shakhtar Donetsk
Koller 50', 68'; Amoroso 64'	Report	Aghahowa 7'

Westfalenstadion, Dortmund
Attendance: 47,000
Referee: Karl-Erik Nilsson (Sweden)

Borussia Dortmund won 5–1 on aggregate.

7 August 2001
18:00

Lokomotiv Moscow (Russia)	3–1	(Austria) Tirol Innsbruck
Lekgetho 2'; Izmailov 37'; Ignashevich 79'	Report	Kirchler 19'

Saturn Stadium, Ramenskoye (Note: Lokomotiv Moscow played their home match at Saturn Stadium in Ramenskoye, as their regular home venue Lokomotiv Stadium in Moscow was closed for renovation.)
Attendance: 12,500
Referee: Kim Milton Nielsen (Denmark)
22 August 2001
17:00

Tirol Innsbruck (Austria)	Annulled (Note: The Tirol Innsbruck v Lokomotiv Moscow second leg match, which Lokomotiv Moscow originally won 1–0, was annulled and replayed after UEFA admitted a referee mistake as Lokomotiv player was not expelled after receiving two yellow cards.) (0–1)	(Russia) Lokomotiv Moscow
	Report	Maminov 51'

Tivoli, Innsbruck
Attendance: 15,400
Referee: Mario van der Ende (Netherlands)
8 September 2001
17:00

Tirol Innsbruck (Austria)	1–0	(Russia) Lokomotiv Moscow
Brzęczek 30'	Report

Tivoli, Innsbruck
Attendance: 14,900
Referee: Vítor Melo Pereira (Portugal)

Lokomotiv Moscow won 3–2 on aggregate.

8 August 2001
20:00

Steaua București (Romania)	2–4	(Ukraine) Dynamo Kyiv
Trică 29', 52'	Report	Byalkevich 9' (pen.), 26'; Idahor 43'; Melaschenko 63'

Stadionul Steaua, Bucharest
Attendance: 15,300
Referee: Konrad Plautz (Austria)
21 August 2001
19:00

Dynamo Kyiv (Ukraine)	1–1	(Romania) Steaua București
Melaschenko 46'	Report	Neaga 30'

Dynamo Stadium, Kyiv
Attendance: 16,800
Referee: Graham Barber (England)

Dynamo Kyiv won 5–3 on aggregate.

8 August 2001
20:00

Haka (Finland)	0–5	(England) Liverpool
	Report	Heskey 32'; Owen 55', 64', 87'; Hyypiä 86'

Helsinki Olympic Stadium, Helsinki (Note: Haka played their Third qualifying round home match at Helsinki Olympic Stadium in Helsinki, instead of their regular venue Tehtaan kenttä in Valkeakoski.)
Attendance: 33,217
Referee: Arturo Daudén Ibáñez (Spain)
21 August 2001
21:00

Liverpool (England)	4–1	(Finland) Haka
Fowler 37'; Redknapp 50'; Heskey 57'; Wilson 83' (o.g.)	Report	Kovács 45'

Anfield, Liverpool
Attendance: 31,602
Referee: Terje Hauge (Norway)

Liverpool won 9–1 on aggregate.

8 August 2001
20:15

Hajduk Split (Croatia)	1–0	(Spain) Mallorca
Bilić 29'	Report

Stadion Poljud, Split
Attendance: 26,922
Referee: Alain Sars (France)
21 August 2001
21:30

Mallorca (Spain)	2–0 (a.e.t.)	(Croatia) Hajduk Split
Eto'o 25'; Luque 92'	Report

Estadi de Son Moix, Palma de Mallorca
Attendance: 23,500
Referee: Hugh Dallas (Scotland)

Mallorca won 2–1 on aggregate.

8 August 2001
20:30

Red Star Belgrade (Federal Republic of Yugoslavia)	0–0	(Germany) Bayer Leverkusen
	Report

Red Star Stadium, Belgrade
Attendance: 37,169
Referee: Jan Wegereef (Netherlands)
21 August 2001
20:30

Bayer Leverkusen (Germany)	3–0	(Federal Republic of Yugoslavia) Red Star Belgrade
Neuville 13', 59'; Kirsten 31'	Report

BayArena, Leverkusen
Attendance: 22,500
Referee: Domenico Messina (Italy)

Bayer Leverkusen won 3–0 on aggregate.

8 August 2001
17:30

Wisła Kraków (Poland)	3–4	(Spain) Barcelona
Pater 22', 32'; Frankowski 38'	Report	Rivaldo 31' (pen.), 34', 73'; Kluivert 56'

Stadion Miejski, Kraków
Attendance: 7,506
Referee: Rune Pedersen (Norway)
21 August 2001
21:15

Barcelona (Spain)	1–0	(Poland) Wisła Kraków
Luis Enrique 72'	Report

Camp Nou, Barcelona
Attendance: 58,233
Referee: Gilles Veissière (France)

Barcelona won 5–3 on aggregate.

8 August 2001
18:15

Copenhagen (Denmark)	2–1	(Italy) Lazio
Laursen 73' (pen.); Fernandez 85'	Report	Crespo 56'

Parken Stadium, Copenhagen
Attendance: 37,516
Referee: Nikolai Levnikov (Russia)
21 August 2001
21:00

Lazio (Italy)	4–1	(Denmark) Copenhagen
Crespo 48', 63'; López 64'; Fiore 90'	Report	Zuma 81'

Stadio Olimpico, Rome
Attendance: 37,133
Referee: Hellmut Krug (Germany)

Lazio won 5–3 on aggregate.

8 August 2001
19:00

Inter Slovnaft Bratislava (Slovakia)	3–3	(Norway) Rosenborg
Lembakoali 50', 62'; Drobňák 67'	Report	Brattbakk 10'; Skammelsrud 76' (pen.); Kunzo 88' (o.g.)

Štadión Pasienky, Bratislava
Attendance: 5,150
Referee: Lucílio Batista (Portugal)
22 August 2001
20:45

Rosenborg (Norway)	4–0	(Slovakia) Inter Slovnaft Bratislava
F. Johnsen 10'; Rushfeldt 15'; Skammelsrud 43'; Strand 86'	Report

Lerkendal Stadion, Trondheim
Attendance: 15,212
Referee: Hartmut Strampe (Germany)

Rosenborg won 7–3 on aggregate.

8 August 2001
19:30

Halmstads BK (Sweden)	2–3	(Belgium) Anderlecht
Svensson 13'; Selaković 76'	Report	Seol 56'; Hasi 66'; Mornar 87'

Örjans Vall, Halmstad
Attendance: 3,876
Referee: Ryszard Wójcik (Poland)
22 August 2001
20:00

Anderlecht (Belgium)	1–1	(Sweden) Halmstads BK
De Boeck 83'	Report	Jönsson 12'

Constant Vanden Stock Stadium, Brussels
Attendance: 16,853
Referee: Kyros Vassaras (Greece)

Anderlecht won 4–3 on aggregate.

8 August 2001
21:00

Slavia Prague (Czech Republic)	1–2	(Greece) Panathinaikos
Kuka 68'	Report	Liberopoulos 25'; Karagounis 57'

Stadion Evžena Rošického, Prague
Attendance: 14,704
Referee: Alain Hamer (Luxembourg)
22 August 2001
20:30

Panathinaikos (Greece)	1–0	(Czech Republic) Slavia Prague
Basinas 27' (pen.)	Report

Leoforos Alexandras Stadium, Athens
Attendance: 14,718
Referee: Anders Frisk (Sweden)

Panathinaikos won 3–1 on aggregate.

8 August 2001
18:30

Galatasaray (Turkey)	2–1	(Bulgaria) Levski Sofia
Ümit Karan 9'; Davala 74'	Report	Ivanov 78'

Ali Sami Yen Stadium, Istanbul
Attendance: 16,051
Referee: Herbert Fandel (Germany)
22 August 2001
18:00

Levski Sofia (Bulgaria)	1–1	(Turkey) Galatasaray
Pantelić 78'	Report	Serkan 50'

Georgi Asparuhov Stadium, Sofia
Attendance: 25,500
Referee: Claude Colombo (France)

Galatasaray won 3–2 on aggregate.

8 August 2001
20:30

Ajax (Netherlands)	1–3	(Scotland) Celtic
Arveladze 40'	Report	Petta 7'; Agathe 19'; Sutton 55'

Amsterdam ArenA, Amsterdam
Attendance: 51,324
Referee: Antonio López Nieto (Spain)
22 August 2001
20:45

Celtic (Scotland)	0–1	(Netherlands) Ajax
	Report	Wamberto 30'

Celtic Park, Glasgow
Attendance: 58,575
Referee: Stefano Braschi (Italy)

Celtic won 3–2 on aggregate.

8 August 2001
22:00

Porto (Portugal)	2–2	(Switzerland) Grasshopper
Paredes 6'; Postiga 59'	Report	Núñez 50'; Petrić 57'

Estádio das Antas, Porto
Attendance: 46,142
Referee: Ľuboš Micheľ (Slovakia)
22 August 2001
20:15

Grasshopper (Switzerland)	2–3	(Portugal) Porto
Petrić 78'; Chapuisat 87'	Report	Clayton 14'; Capucho 43'; Deco 80'

Hardturm, Zürich
Attendance: 16,066
Referee: Stuart Dougal (Scotland)

Porto won 5–4 on aggregate.

8 August 2001
21:00

Parma (Italy)	0–2	(France) Lille
	Report	Bassir 47'; Ecker 80'

Stadio Ennio Tardini, Parma
Attendance: 14,974
Referee: Juan Fernández Marín (Spain)
22 August 2001
20:45

Lille (France)	0–1	(Italy) Parma
	Report	Sensini 28'

Stade Grimonprez-Jooris, Lille
Attendance: 14,358
Referee: Graham Poll (England)

Lille won 2–1 on aggregate.

8 August 2001
20:45

Rangers (Scotland)	0–0	(Turkey) Fenerbahçe
	Report

Ibrox Stadium, Glasgow
Attendance: 49,472
Referee: Urs Meier (Switzerland)
22 August 2001
20:00

Fenerbahçe (Turkey)	2–1	(Scotland) Rangers
Revivo 4'; Serhat 72'	Report	Ricksen 75'

Şükrü Saracoğlu Stadium, Istanbul
Attendance: 18,272
Referee: Pierluigi Collina (Italy)

Fenerbahçe won 2–1 on aggregate.
