= 2001 Taça de Portugal final =

- Event: 2000–01 Taça de Portugal
Marítimo	Porto
0	2
- Date: 10 June 2001
- Venue: Estádio Nacional, Oeiras
- Man of the Match: Pena (Porto)
- Referee: Jorge Coroado (Lisbon)

The 2001 Taça de Portugal final was the final match of the 2000–01 Taça de Portugal, the 61st season of the Taça de Portugal, the premier Portuguese football cup competition organized by the Portuguese Football Federation (FPF). The match was played on 10 June 2001 at the Estádio Nacional in Oeiras, and opposed two Primeira Liga sides Marítimo and Porto. Porto defeated Marítimo 2–0 to claim their eleventh Taça de Portugal.

As a result of Porto winning the Taça de Portugal, the Dragões qualified for the 2001 Supertaça Cândido de Oliveira where they took on 2000–01 Primeira Liga winners Boavista at the Estádio do Rio Ave FC.

== Match ==
=== Details ===
10 June 2001
17:00 WEST

Marítimo	0–2	Porto
		Pena 13'; Alenichev 79'

Estádio Nacional, Oeiras
Referee: Jorge Coroado (Lisbon)

Marítimo	Porto

GK	24	(Brazil) Gilmar
RB	23	(Guinea-Bissau) Lino
CB	14	(Brazil) Paulo Sérgio
CB	5	(Portugal) Jorge Soares (c)
LB	2	(Portugal) Albertino
DM	10	(Portugal) Bruno	(yellow card) 66'	(substituted off) 71'
CM	11	(Bulgaria) Ilian Iliev		(substituted off) 64'
CM	21	(Portugal) Mariano
RM	30	(Portugal) Joel Santos		(substituted off) 80'
LM	20	(Portugal) Joaquim Ferraz
CF	13	(Portugal) Hugo Porfírio
Substitutes:
GK	1	(Angola) Nélson
DF	3	(Portugal) Carlos Jorge
MF	7	(Portugal) Zeca		(substituted on) 80'
MF	22	(Portugal) Bakero		(substituted on) 64'
FW	9	(Romania) Marius Șumudică		(substituted on) 71'
Manager:
(Portugal) Nelo Vingada

GK	55	(Russia) Sergei Ovchinnikov
RB	7	(Portugal) Carlos Secretário
CB	2	(Portugal) Jorge Costa (c)
CB	13	(Portugal) Jorge Andrade
LB	3	(Portugal) Fernando Nélson
DM	5	(Paraguay) Carlos Paredes		(substituted off) 46'
CM	10	(Brazil) Deco
CM	15	(Russia) Dmitri Alenichev	(yellow card) 79'
RM	21	(Portugal) Capucho		(substituted off) 85'
LM	28	(Brazil) Clayton		(substituted off) 80'
CF	31	(Brazil) Pena
Substitutes:
GK	44	(Portugal) Pedro Espinha
DF	25	(Portugal) Cândido Costa		(substituted on) 80'
MF	20	(Portugal) Paulinho Santos		(substituted on) 46'
MF	23	(Croatia) Silvio Marić
MF	29	(Portugal) António Folha		(substituted on) 85'
Manager:
(Portugal) Fernando Santos

2000–01 Taça de Portugal Winners
Porto
11th Title

Man of the match

- (Brazil) Pena (Porto)

Match officials

- Assistant referees:
- Fourth official:

Match rules

- 90 minutes.
- Five named substitutes
- Maximum of three substitutions
