= 2000–01 Primeira Liga =

67th season of top-tier Portuguese football

Primeira Liga
- Season: 2000–01
- Dates: 18 August 2000 – 27 May 2001
- Champions: Boavista; 1st title
- Relegated: Campomaiorense; Desportivo das Aves; Estrela da Amadora
- Champions League: Boavista (group stage); Porto (second qualifying round)
- UEFA Cup: Sporting CP (first round); Marítimo (qualifying round)
- Matches: 306
- Goals: 807 (2.64 per match)
- Top goalscorer: Pena (22 goals)
- Biggest home win: Porto 6–0 Alverca (30 October 2000)
- Biggest away win: Campomaiorense 0–5 Porto (18 September 2000)
- Highest scoring: Braga 3–5 União de Leiria (27 May 2001)

The 2000–01 Primeira Liga was the 67th edition of the top flight of Portuguese football. It started on 19 August 2000 with a match between Braga and Vitória de Guimarães, and ended on 27 May 2001. The league was contested by 18 clubs, with Sporting CP as the defending champions.

Boavista won their first league title, becoming only the second champions from outside the Portuguese "Big Three" (Os Três Grandes) of Benfica, Porto and Sporting, after Belenenses in the 1945–46 season. Boavista qualified for the 2001–02 UEFA Champions League group stage along with Porto, who entered the second qualifying round. Sporting and Marítimo qualified for the 2001–02 UEFA Cup. At the bottom of the table, Campomaiorense, Desportivo das Aves and Estrela da Amadora were relegated to the Segunda Liga. Pena finished as the top scorer with 22 goals. This season saw also Benfica finish sixth, their lowest ever Primeira Liga position.

== Promotion and relegation ==
=== Teams relegated to Segunda Liga ===
- Vitória de Setúbal
- Rio Ave
- Santa Clara

Vitória de Setúbal, Rio Ave and Santa Clara were consigned to the Segunda Liga after finishing as the bottom three teams in 1999–2000 season.

=== Teams promoted from Segunda Liga ===
- Paços de Ferreira
- Beira-Mar
- Desportivo das Aves

The other three teams were replaced by Paços de Ferreira, Beira-Mar and Desportivo das Aves from the Segunda Liga.

== Teams ==
=== Stadia and locations ===
Location of teams in Primeira Liga 2000-01 (Mainland)
Location of teams in Primeira Liga 2000-01 (Madeira)

Team	Head coach	City	Stadium	1999–00 finish
Alverca	(Portugal) Jesualdo Ferreira	Alverca	Complexo do Alverca	11th
Beira-Mar	(Portugal) António Sousa	Aveiro	Estádio Mário Duarte	2nd in Divisão de Honra
Belenenses	(Brazil) Marinho Peres	Lisbon	Estádio do Restelo	12th
Benfica	(Germany) Jupp Heynckes	Lisbon	Estádio da Luz	3rd
Boavista	(Portugal) Jaime Pacheco	Porto	Estádio do Bessa	4th
Braga	(Portugal) Manuel Cajuda	Braga	Estádio Primeiro de Maio	9th
Campomaiorense	(Portugal) Carlos Manuel	Campo Maior	Estádio Capitão Cesar Correia	13th
Desportivo das Aves	(Portugal) Manuel Gomes	Vila das Aves	Estádio do CD das Aves	3rd in Divisão de Honra
Estrela da Amadora	(Portugal) Quinito	Amadora	Estádio José Gomes	8th
Farense	(Portugal) Manuel Balela	Faro	Estádio de São Luís	14th
Marítimo	(Portugal) Nelo Vingada	Funchal	Estádio dos Barreiros	6th
Paços de Ferreira	(Portugal) José Mota	Paços de Ferreira	Estádio da Mata Real	1st in Divisão de Honra
Porto	(Portugal) Fernando Santos	Porto	Estádio das Antas	2nd
Salgueiros	(Portugal) Vítor Manuel	Porto	Estádio Engenheiro Vidal Pinheiro	15th
Sporting CP	(Portugal) Augusto Inácio	Lisbon	Estádio José Alvalade	1st
União de Leiria	(Portugal) Manuel José	Leiria	Estádio Dr. Magalhães Pessoa	10th
Vitória de Guimarães	(Brazil) Paulo Autuori	Guimarães	Estádio D. Afonso Henriques	7th

=== Managerial changes ===
Team	Outgoing manager	Date of vacancy	Position in table	Incoming manager	Date of appointment
Benfica	(Germany) Jupp Heynckes	18 September 2000	7th	(Portugal) José Mourinho	20 September 2000
Vitória de Guimarães	(Brazil) Paulo Autuori	18 November 2000	12th	(Portugal) Álvaro Magalhães	19 November 2000
Sporting CP	(Portugal) Augusto Inácio	25 November 2000	2nd	(Portugal) Fernando Mendes	26 November 2000
Desportivo das Aves	(Portugal) Manuel Gomes	3 December 2000	16th	(Portugal) Carlos Carvalhal	4 December 2000
Benfica	(Portugal) José Mourinho	5 December 2000	6th	(Portugal) Toni	6 December 2000
Sporting CP	(Portugal) Fernando Mendes	21 January 2001	3rd	(Portugal) Manuel Fernandes	22 January 2001
Estrela da Amadora	(Portugal) Quinito	26 January 2001	18th	(Portugal) Carlos Brito	27 January 2001
Vitória de Guimarães	(Portugal) Álvaro Magalhães	26 February 2001	14th	(Portugal) Augusto Inácio	27 February 2001
Campomaiorense	(Portugal) Carlos Manuel	11 March 2001	15th	(Portugal) Diamantino Miranda	12 March 2001

== League table ==
Pos	Team	Pld	W	D	L	GF	GA	GD	Pts	Qualification or relegation
1	Boavista (C)	34	23	8	3	63	22	+41	77	Qualification to Champions League first group stage
2	Porto	34	24	4	6	73	27	+46	76	Qualification to Champions League second qualifying round
3	Sporting CP	34	19	5	10	56	37	+19	62	Qualification to UEFA Cup first round
4	Braga	34	16	9	9	58	48	+10	57	
5	União de Leiria	34	15	11	8	46	41	+5	56	
6	Benfica	34	15	9	10	54	44	+10	54	
7	Belenenses	34	14	10	10	43	36	+7	52	
8	Beira-Mar	34	14	7	13	45	49	−4	49	
9	Paços de Ferreira	34	12	12	10	47	39	+8	48	
10	Salgueiros	34	13	4	17	41	55	−14	43	
11	Marítimo	34	12	7	15	34	37	−3	43	Qualification to UEFA Cup qualifying round (Note: Marítimo qualified for the UEFA Cup as Portuguese Cup runners-up)
12	Alverca	34	12	7	15	45	52	−7	43	
13	Farense	34	10	9	15	37	47	−10	39	
14	Gil Vicente	34	10	7	17	34	41	−7	37	
15	Vitória de Guimarães	34	9	9	16	41	49	−8	36	
16	Campomaiorense (R)	34	7	11	16	29	58	−29	32	Relegation to Segunda Liga
17	Desportivo das Aves (R)	34	4	10	20	31	68	−37	22	Relegation to Segunda Liga
18	Estrela da Amadora (R)	34	4	7	23	30	57	−27	19	Relegation to Segunda Liga

Source: Primeira Divisão
Rules for classification: 1) points; 2) head-to-head points; 3) head-to-head goal difference; 4) goal difference; 5) number of goals scored
(C) Champions; (R) Relegated

== Results ==
Home \ Away	ALV	BEM	BEL	BEN	BOA	BRA	CPM	DAV	EST	FAR	GVI	MAR	PAÇ	POR	SAL	SCP	ULE	VGU
Alverca		0–1	0–3	2–1	1–2	4–1	2–1	5–1	3–1	0–1	2–0	0–0	2–0	1–3	0–3	3–1	0–1	1–3
Beira-Mar	0–0		2–2	1–3	2–4	3–0	0–0	1–0	3–3	0–2	1–0	2–0	1–0	0–3	3–2	0–1	3–1	3–2
Belenenses	1–0	0–1		1–0	2–2	2–1	1–1	5–0	0–3	4–2	1–3	1–0	0–0	2–0	2–0	1–1	1–1	1–0
Benfica	0–2	4–1	1–0		0–0	2–2	2–0	5–1	2–1	2–1	0–0	3–0	2–3	2–1	1–1	3–0	3–2	1–0
Boavista	5–1	1–0	2–0	1–0		1–2	3–1	3–0	1–0	1–0	2–0	3–1	1–0	1–0	5–0	1–0	4–0	4–1
Braga	1–1	3–3	2–0	3–1	1–0		4–0	2–0	1–1	3–0	3–1	2–1	2–2	2–1	2–0	3–2	3–5	1–0
Campomaiorense	0–4	0–2	0–1	1–1	0–0	1–1		0–0	4–1	1–0	1–0	2–2	2–1	0–5	2–3	1–0	1–1	0–1
Desportivo das Aves	0–0	2–3	0–1	4–4	1–2	2–1	2–2		3–2	3–1	1–0	1–1	1–1	0–1	0–3	3–4	1–1	0–3
Estrela da Amadora	1–2	1–1	0–2	1–2	0–0	0–1	4–0	0–0		1–2	2–1	0–1	1–1	2–3	1–0	1–2	1–2	0–2
Farense	2–0	1–2	3–1	2–2	2–2	1–0	1–3	1–0	2–0		1–1	1–2	2–4	1–3	2–1	2–1	1–1	1–1
Gil Vicente	1–2	3–0	2–1	3–0	0–2	1–1	1–1	1–0	0–0	0–0		2–0	3–1	2–2	0–2	0–2	2–0	4–1
Marítimo	2–1	2–1	1–2	3–0	1–1	2–0	3–0	2–1	2–1	1–1	1–0		1–1	0–1	0–1	0–2	2–1	1–0
Paços de Ferreira	2–2	3–2	2–2	0–0	0–2	4–2	0–1	2–0	4–1	1–1	2–0	2–1		1–0	1–1	0–0	0–0	0–1
Porto	6–0	2–0	0–0	2–0	4–0	3–2	3–1	4–0	2–1	2–0	2–0	1–0	2–1		5–1	2–2	3–0	2–0
Salgueiros	3–1	0–1	2–0	1–2	1–5	3–4	0–0	2–1	1–0	0–0	0–1	1–0	1–0	0–1		2–5	1–4	2–1
Sporting CP	1–1	2–1	2–1	3–0	0–0	1–2	2–1	2–0	1–0	1–0	3–1	1–0	1–3	0–1	2–0		4–0	3–1
União de Leiria	2–0	1–0	1–1	1–1	0–0	0–0	4–1	1–1	2–0	2–0	1–0	1–0	1–4	3–1	2–1	2–0		1–1
Vitória de Guimarães	2–2	1–1	1–1	0–4	1–2	0–0	3–0	2–2	4–0	1–0	3–1	1–1	0–1	2–2	1–2	1–4	0–1	

Source: Foradejogo (in Portuguese)
Legend: Blue = home team win; Yellow = draw; Red = away team win.

== Top goalscorers ==
Rank	Player	Club	Goals
1	(Brazil) Pena	Porto	22
2	(Netherlands) Pierre van Hooijdonk	Benfica	19
3	(Brazil) Rafael	Paços de Ferreira	17
4	(Portugal) João Tomás	Benfica	17
4	(Morocco) Hassan Nader	Farense	17
6	(Hungary) Miklós Fehér	Braga	14
6	(Argentina) Alberto Acosta	Sporting	14
8	(Brazil) Marcão	Belenenses	13
8	(Brazil) Derlei	União de Leiria	13
10	(Brazil) Zé Roberto	Braga	12

== Attendances ==
#	Club	Average
1	Benfica	27,206
2	Sporting	19,000
3	Porto	17,776
4	Braga	11,941
5	Vitória SC	7,748
6	Boavista	6,294
7	Marítimo	5,353
8	Beira-Mar	4,765
9	Os Belenenses	4,412
10	Farense	4,059
11	Paços de Ferreira	3,500
12	Alverca	3,441
13	Salgueiros	3,382
14	União de Leiria	3,265
15	Aves	3,176
16	Campomaiorense	3,088
17	Gil Vicente	2,412
18	Estrela da Amadora	2,059
