= Nuhiji =

Nuhiji is a surname. Notable people with the surname include:

- Arbën Nuhiji (born 1972), Macedonian footballer
- Ardijan Nuhiji (born 1978), Macedonian footballer
