= 2001–02 UEFA Champions League first group stage =

International football competition

The first group stage of the 2001–02 UEFA Champions League was the first stage of the competition proper, following the qualifying phase. 16 winners from the third qualifying round, 10 champions from countries ranked 1–10, and six second-placed teams from countries ranked 1–6 were drawn into eight groups of four teams each. Play began on 11 September 2001 and ended on 31 October 2001, when the top two teams in each group advanced to the second group stage, and the third-placed team in each group dropped down to the Third Round of the 2001–02 UEFA Cup.

Due to the September 11 attacks, matches scheduled to take place on 12 September were postponed until 10 October. Matches scheduled on the day of the attacks went ahead with a minute's silence taking place before kick-off.

== Teams ==
Seeding was determined by the UEFA coefficients. Clubs from the same association were split between groups A–D and E–H, ensuring that they not play on the same day if possible.

Key to colors
Teams advance to the second group stage
Teams enter the UEFA Cup round of 32

Pot 1
Team	Notes	Coeff.
(Germany) Bayern Munich		110.316
(Spain) Real Madrid		114.605
(England) Manchester United		110.644
(Spain) Barcelona		108.604
(Italy) Lazio		105.119
(Italy) Juventus		98.119
(England) Arsenal		76.644
(England) Liverpool		73.643

Pot 2
Team	Notes	Coeff.
(Germany) Borussia Dortmund		73.315
(Turkey) Galatasaray		71.987
(Portugal) Porto		68.136
(Italy) Roma		68.119
(France) Lyon		64.176
(Spain) Deportivo La Coruña		63.605
(Russia) Spartak Moscow		61.854
(Spain) Mallorca		60.604

Pot 3
Team	Notes	Coeff.
(Germany) Schalke 04		57.316
(Germany) Bayer Leverkusen		56.315
(Ukraine) Dynamo Kyiv		55.915
(Russia) Lokomotiv Moscow		53.853
(Norway) Rosenborg		53.799
(Netherlands) Feyenoord		53.124
(Netherlands) PSV Eindhoven		51.124
(Greece) Olympiacos		47.183

Pot 4
Team	Notes	Coeff.
(France) Nantes		45.176
(Belgium) Anderlecht		43.075
(Czech Republic) Sparta Prague		37.395
(Greece) Panathinaikos		37.183
(Portugal) Boavista		28.137
(Scotland) Celtic		25.310
(Turkey) Fenerbahçe		24.987
(France) Lille		21.175

Notes

1. ^{TH} Champions League title holders (automatic top seed of pot 1)
2. ^{Q3} Winners of the third qualifying round

== Groups ==
=== Group A ===
Pos	Team	Pld	W	D	L	GF	GA	GD	Pts	Qualification	RMA	ROM	LMO	AND
1	(Spain) Real Madrid	6	4	1	1	13	5	+8	13	Advance to second group stage	—	1–1	4–0	4–1
2	(Italy) Roma	6	2	3	1	6	5	+1	9	Advance to second group stage	1–2	—	2–1	1–1
3	(Russia) Lokomotiv Moscow	6	2	1	3	9	9	0	7	Transfer to UEFA Cup	2–0	0–1	—	1–1
4	(Belgium) Anderlecht	6	0	3	3	4	13	−9	3		0–2	0–0	1–5	—

Source: RSSSF
11 September 2001
18:00

Lokomotiv Moscow (Russia)	1–1	(Belgium) Anderlecht
Maminov 18'	Report	Hendrikx 15'

Central Dynamo Stadium, Moscow
Attendance: 13,449
Referee: Vladimír Hriňák (Slovakia)
11 September 2001
20:45

Roma (Italy)	1–2	(Spain) Real Madrid
Totti 73' (pen.)	Report	Figo 50'; Guti 63'

Stadio Olimpico, Rome
Attendance: 71,376
Referee: Graham Poll (England)

19 September 2001
20:45

Anderlecht (Belgium)	0–0	(Italy) Roma
	Report

Constant Vanden Stock Stadium, Brussels
Attendance: 21,436
Referee: Karl-Erik Nilsson (Sweden)
19 September 2001
20:45

Real Madrid (Spain)	4–0	(Russia) Lokomotiv Moscow
Munitis 39'; Figo 64' (pen.); Roberto Carlos 81'; Sávio 87'	Report

Santiago Bernabéu, Madrid
Attendance: 45,045
Referee: Stéphane Bré (France)

26 September 2001
20:45

Real Madrid (Spain)	4–1	(Belgium) Anderlecht
Celades 49'; Raúl 51', 68'; Solari 79'	Report	Dindane 33'

Santiago Bernabéu, Madrid
Attendance: 53,118
Referee: Terje Hauge (Norway)
26 September 2001
20:45

Roma (Italy)	2–1	(Russia) Lokomotiv Moscow
Chugainov 69' (o.g.); Totti 79'	Report	Obradović 59'

Stadio Olimpico, Rome
Attendance: 38,472
Referee: Hartmut Strampe (Germany)

16 October 2001
18:00

Lokomotiv Moscow (Russia)	0–1	(Italy) Roma
	Report	Cafu 78'

Central Dynamo Stadium, Moscow
Attendance: 16,000
Referee: Dick Jol (Netherlands)
16 October 2001
20:45

Anderlecht (Belgium)	0–2	(Spain) Real Madrid
	Report	Roberto Carlos 19'; McManaman 35'

Constant Vanden Stock Stadium, Brussels
Attendance: 21,922
Referee: Knud Erik Fisker (Denmark)

24 October 2001
20:45

Anderlecht (Belgium)	1–5	(Russia) Lokomotiv Moscow
Ilić 2'	Report	Izmailov 13'; Sennikov 28'; Pimenov 58'; Buznikin 63', 69'

Constant Vanden Stock Stadium, Brussels
Attendance: 22,502
Referee: Mike McCurry (Scotland)
24 October 2001
20:45

Real Madrid (Spain)	1–1	(Italy) Roma
Figo 75' (pen.)	Report	Totti 35'

Santiago Bernabéu, Madrid
Attendance: 62,800
Referee: Hellmut Krug (Germany)

30 October 2001
18:45

Roma (Italy)	1–1	(Belgium) Anderlecht
Delvecchio 52'	Report	Mornar 11'

Stadio Olimpico, Rome
Attendance: 28,157
Referee: Éric Poulat (France)
30 October 2001
18:45

Lokomotiv Moscow (Russia)	2–0	(Spain) Real Madrid
Buznikin 30'; Cherevchenko 50'	Report

Central Dynamo Stadium, Moscow
Attendance: 15,000
Referee: Mike Riley (England)

=== Group B ===
Pos	Team	Pld	W	D	L	GF	GA	GD	Pts	Qualification	LIV	BOA	DOR	DKV
1	(England) Liverpool	6	3	3	0	7	3	+4	12	Advance to second group stage	—	1–1	2–0	1–0
2	(Portugal) Boavista	6	2	2	2	8	7	+1	8	Advance to second group stage	1–1	—	2–1	3–1
3	(Germany) Borussia Dortmund	6	2	2	2	6	7	−1	8	Transfer to UEFA Cup	0–0	2–1	—	1–0
4	(Ukraine) Dynamo Kyiv	6	1	1	4	5	9	−4	4		1–2	1–0	2–2	—

Source: RSSSF
11 September 2001
20:45

Liverpool (England)	1–1	(Portugal) Boavista
Owen 29'	Report	Silva 3'

Anfield, Liverpool
Attendance: 30,015
Referee: Kyros Vassaras (Greece)
11 September 2001
20:45

Dynamo Kyiv (Ukraine)	2–2	(Germany) Borussia Dortmund
Melaschenko 15'; Idahor 45+1'	Report	Koller 56'; Amoroso 74'

Olimpiyskiy NSC, Kyiv
Attendance: 67,000
Referee: Ľuboš Micheľ (Slovakia)

19 September 2001
20:45

Borussia Dortmund (Germany)	0–0	(England) Liverpool
	Report

Westfalenstadion, Dortmund
Attendance: 45,210
Referee: Valentin Ivanov (Russia)
19 September 2001
20:45

Boavista (Portugal)	3–1	(Ukraine) Dynamo Kyiv
Sánchez 4'; Silva 11'; Duda 30'	Report	Ghioane 5'

Estádio do Bessa, Porto
Attendance: 6,873
Referee: Alfredo Trentalange (Italy)

26 September 2001
20:45

Boavista (Portugal)	2–1	(Germany) Borussia Dortmund
Silva 23'; Sánchez 39'	Report	Amoroso 76'

Estádio do Bessa, Porto
Attendance: 7,600
Referee: Rune Pedersen (Norway)
26 September 2001
20:45

Liverpool (England)	1–0	(Ukraine) Dynamo Kyiv
Litmanen 23'	Report

Anfield, Liverpool
Attendance: 33,513
Referee: Pierluigi Collina (Italy)

16 October 2001
20:45

Borussia Dortmund (Germany)	2–1	(Portugal) Boavista
Ricken 50'; Koller 68'	Report	Alex Goulart 33'

Westfalenstadion, Dortmund
Attendance: 41,247
Referee: Stefano Braschi (Italy)
16 October 2001
20:45

Dynamo Kyiv (Ukraine)	1–2	(England) Liverpool
Ghioane 59'	Report	Murphy 43'; Gerrard 67'

Olimpiyskiy NSC, Kyiv
Attendance: 50,000
Referee: Claude Colombo (France)

24 October 2001
20:45

Boavista (Portugal)	1–1	(England) Liverpool
Silva 60'	Report	Murphy 17'

Estádio do Bessa, Porto
Attendance: 9,876
Referee: Karl-Erik Nilsson (Sweden)
24 October 2001
20:45

Borussia Dortmund (Germany)	1–0	(Ukraine) Dynamo Kyiv
Rosický 34'	Report

Westfalenstadion, Dortmund
Attendance: 41,500
Referee: Kyros Vassaras (Greece)

30 October 2001
20:45

Liverpool (England)	2–0	(Germany) Borussia Dortmund
Šmicer 15'; Wright 82'	Report

Anfield, Liverpool
Attendance: 41,507
Referee: Kim Milton Nielsen (Denmark)
30 October 2001
20:45

Dynamo Kyiv (Ukraine)	1–0	(Portugal) Boavista
Melaschenko 49'	Report

Olimpiyskiy NSC, Kyiv
Attendance: 18,000
Referee: Fritz Stuchlik (Austria)

=== Group C ===
Pos	Team	Pld	W	D	L	GF	GA	GD	Pts	Qualification	PAN	ARS	MLL	SCH
1	(Greece) Panathinaikos	6	4	0	2	8	3	+5	12	Advance to second group stage	—	1–0	2–0	2–0
2	(England) Arsenal	6	3	0	3	9	9	0	9	Advance to second group stage	2–1	—	3–1	3–2
3	(Spain) Mallorca	6	3	0	3	4	9	−5	9	Transfer to UEFA Cup	1–0	1–0	—	0–4
4	(Germany) Schalke 04	6	2	0	4	9	9	0	6		0–2	3–1	0–1	—

Source: RSSSF
11 September 2001
20:45

Schalke 04 (Germany)	0–2	(Greece) Panathinaikos
	Report	Vlaović 75'; Basinas 80'

Arena AufSchalke, Gelsenkirchen
Attendance: 52,333
Referee: Stefano Braschi (Italy)
11 September 2001
20:45

Mallorca (Spain)	1–0	(England) Arsenal
Engonga 12' (pen.)	Report

Estadi de Son Moix, Palma de Mallorca
Attendance: 19,019
Referee: Knud Erik Fisker (Denmark)

19 September 2001
20:45

Arsenal (England)	3–2	(Germany) Schalke 04
Ljungberg 33'; Henry 36', 47' (pen.)	Report	Van Hoogdalem 43'; Mpenza 59'

Highbury, London
Attendance: 35,361
Referee: Claude Colombo (France)
19 September 2001
20:45

Panathinaikos (Greece)	2–0	(Spain) Mallorca
Vlaović 25'; Konstantinou 28'	Report

Leoforos Alexandras Stadium, Athens
Attendance: 15,003
Referee: Konrad Plautz (Austria)

26 September 2001
20:45

Panathinaikos (Greece)	1–0	(England) Arsenal
Karagounis 25'	Report

Leoforos Alexandras Stadium, Athens
Attendance: 15,012
Referee: Vítor Melo Pereira (Portugal)
26 September 2001
20:45

Schalke 04 (Germany)	0–1	(Spain) Mallorca
	Report	Eto'o 66'

Arena AufSchalke, Gelsenkirchen
Attendance: 51,860
Referee: Nikolai Levnikov (Russia)

16 October 2001
20:45

Arsenal (England)	2–1	(Greece) Panathinaikos
Henry 23', 52' (pen.)	Report	Olisadebe 50'

Highbury, London
Attendance: 35,432
Referee: Urs Meier (Switzerland)
16 October 2001
20:45

Mallorca (Spain)	0–4	(Germany) Schalke 04
	Report	Van Hoogdalem 15'; Hajto 22' (pen.); Asamoah 77'; Sand 84'

Estadi de Son Moix, Palma de Mallorca
Attendance: 19,300
Referee: Jan Wegereef (Netherlands)

24 October 2001
20:45

Panathinaikos (Greece)	2–0	(Germany) Schalke 04
Olisadebe 31'; Konstantinou 60'	Report

Leoforos Alexandras Stadium, Athens
Attendance: 15,097
Referee: Alain Sars (France)
24 October 2001
20:45

Arsenal (England)	3–1	(Spain) Mallorca
Pires 61'; Bergkamp 63'; Henry 90+3'	Report	Novo 74'

Highbury, London
Attendance: 34,764
Referee: Dick Jol (Netherlands)

30 October 2001
20:45

Schalke 04 (Germany)	3–1	(England) Arsenal
Mulder 2'; Vermant 60'; Möller 64'	Report	Wiltord 71'

Arena AufSchalke, Gelsenkirchen
Attendance: 52,321
Referee: Ryszard Wójcik (Poland)
30 October 2001
20:45

Mallorca (Spain)	1–0	(Greece) Panathinaikos
Biagini 57'	Report

Estadi de Son Moix, Palma de Mallorca
Attendance: 11,174
Referee: Karl-Erik Nilsson (Sweden)

=== Group D ===
Pos	Team	Pld	W	D	L	GF	GA	GD	Pts	Qualification	NAN	GAL	PSV	LAZ
1	(France) Nantes	6	3	2	1	8	3	+5	11	Advance to second group stage	—	0–1	4–1	1–0
2	(Turkey) Galatasaray	6	3	1	2	5	4	+1	10	Advance to second group stage	0–0	—	2–0	1–0
3	(Netherlands) PSV Eindhoven	6	2	1	3	6	9	−3	7	Transfer to UEFA Cup	0–0	3–1	—	1–0
4	(Italy) Lazio	6	2	0	4	4	7	−3	6		1–3	1–0	2–1	—

Source: RSSSF
11 September 2001
20:45

Nantes (France)	4–1	(Netherlands) PSV Eindhoven
André 5'; Quint 10' (pen.); Dalmat 44'; Vahirua 75'	Report	De Jong 90+3'

Stade de la Beaujoire, Nantes
Attendance: 23,481
Referee: Juan Fernández Marin (Spain)
11 September 2001
20:45

Galatasaray (Turkey)	1–0	(Italy) Lazio
Ümit Karan 79'	Report

Ali Sami Yen Stadium, Istanbul
Attendance: 13,850
Referee: Ryszard Wójcik (Poland)

19 September 2001
20:45

Lazio (Italy)	1–3	(France) Nantes
Couto 7'	Report	Fabbri 3'; Armand 63'; Ziani 86'

Stadio Olimpico, Rome
Attendance: 17,798
Referee: Herbert Fandel (Germany)
19 September 2001
20:45

PSV Eindhoven (Netherlands)	3–1	(Turkey) Galatasaray
Bruggink 38'; Faber 53'; Kežman 90+4'	Report	Ümit Karan 68'

GelreDome, Arnhem
Attendance: 22,335
Referee: Manuel Mejuto González (Spain)

26 September 2001
20:45

PSV Eindhoven (Netherlands)	1–0	(Italy) Lazio
Hofland 40'	Report

Philips Stadion, Eindhoven
Attendance: 27,000
Referee: Mike McCurry (Scotland)
26 September 2001
20:45

Nantes (France)	0–1	(Turkey) Galatasaray
	Report	Yalçın 79'

Stade de la Beaujoire, Nantes
Attendance: 30,715
Referee: Tom Henning Øvrebø (Norway)

16 October 2001
20:45

Lazio (Italy)	2–1	(Netherlands) PSV Eindhoven
Fiore 39'; López 55' (pen.)	Report	Kežman 56'

Stadio Olimpico, Rome
Attendance: 18,417
Referee: Antonio López Nieto (Spain)
16 October 2001
20:45

Galatasaray (Turkey)	0–0	(France) Nantes
	Report

Ali Sami Yen Stadium, Istanbul
Attendance: 19,100
Referee: Hellmut Krug (Germany)

24 October 2001
20:45

PSV Eindhoven (Netherlands)	0–0	(France) Nantes
	Report

Philips Stadion, Eindhoven
Attendance: 29,050
Referee: Wolfgang Stark (Germany)
24 October 2001
20:45

Lazio (Italy)	1–0	(Turkey) Galatasaray
Stanković 76'	Report

Stadio Olimpico, Rome
Attendance: 20,363
Referee: Nikolai Levnikov (Russia)

30 October 2001
20:45

Nantes (France)	1–0	(Italy) Lazio
André 72'	Report

Stade de la Beaujoire, Nantes
Attendance: 34,754
Referee: Terje Hauge (Norway)
30 October 2001
20:45

Galatasaray (Turkey)	2–0	(Netherlands) PSV Eindhoven
Yalçın 26'; Erdem 50'	Report

Ali Sami Yen Stadium, Istanbul
Attendance: 21,200
Referee: Ľuboš Micheľ (Slovakia)

=== Group E ===
Pos	Team	Pld	W	D	L	GF	GA	GD	Pts	Qualification	JUV	POR	CEL	ROS
1	(Italy) Juventus	6	3	2	1	11	8	+3	11	Advance to second group stage	—	3–1	3–2	1–0
2	(Portugal) Porto	6	3	1	2	7	5	+2	10	Advance to second group stage	0–0	—	3–0	1–0
3	(Scotland) Celtic	6	3	0	3	8	11	−3	9	Transfer to UEFA Cup	4–3	1–0	—	1–0
4	(Norway) Rosenborg	6	1	1	4	4	6	−2	4		1–1	1–2	2–0	—

Source: RSSSF
18 September 2001
20:45

Juventus (Italy)	3–2	(Scotland) Celtic
Trezeguet 43', 55'; Amoruso 90' (pen.)	Report	Petrov 67'; Larsson 86' (pen.)

Stadio delle Alpi, Turin
Attendance: 43,017
Referee: Hellmut Krug (Germany)
18 September 2001
20:45

Rosenborg (Norway)	1–2	(Portugal) Porto
Rushfeldt 90+2'	Report	Pena 10'; Deco 60'

Lerkendal Stadion, Trondheim
Attendance: 20,007
Referee: Graham Barber (England)

25 September 2001
20:45

Rosenborg (Norway)	1–1	(Italy) Juventus
Skammelsrud 89' (pen.)	Report	Del Piero 85'

Lerkendal Stadion, Trondheim
Attendance: 20,748
Referee: Jan Wegereef (Netherlands)
25 September 2001
20:45

Celtic (Scotland)	1–0	(Portugal) Porto
Larsson 36'	Report

Celtic Park, Glasgow
Attendance: 54,650
Referee: Dick Jol (Netherlands)

10 October 2001
20:45

Celtic (Scotland)	1–0	(Norway) Rosenborg
Thompson 21'	Report

Celtic Park, Glasgow
Attendance: 57,233
Referee: Alain Sars (France)
10 October 2001
20:45

Porto (Portugal)	0–0	(Italy) Juventus
	Report

Estádio das Antas, Porto
Attendance: 40,228
Referee: Manuel Mejuto González (Spain)

17 October 2001
20:45

Juventus (Italy)	1–0	(Norway) Rosenborg
Trezeguet 25'	Report

Stadio delle Alpi, Turin
Attendance: 38,642
Referee: Graham Poll (England)
17 October 2001
20:45

Porto (Portugal)	3–0	(Scotland) Celtic
Clayton 1', 61'; Silva 45+1'	Report

Estádio das Antas, Porto
Attendance: 30,313
Referee: René Temmink (Netherlands)

23 October 2001
20:45

Rosenborg (Norway)	2–0	(Scotland) Celtic
Brattbakk 19', 36'	Report

Lerkendal Stadion, Trondheim
Attendance: 21,540
Referee: Juan Fernández Marin (Spain)
23 October 2001
20:45

Juventus (Italy)	3–1	(Portugal) Porto
Del Piero 32'; Montero 47'; Trezeguet 73'	Report	Clayton 13'

Stadio delle Alpi, Turin
Attendance: 38,328
Referee: Anders Frisk (Sweden)

31 October 2001
20:45

Celtic (Scotland)	4–3	(Italy) Juventus
Valgaeren 24'; Sutton 45', 64'; Larsson 57' (pen.)	Report	Del Piero 19'; Trezeguet 51', 77'

Celtic Park, Glasgow
Attendance: 57,717
Referee: Gilles Veissière (France)
31 October 2001
20:45

Porto (Portugal)	1–0	(Norway) Rosenborg
Pena 37'	Report

Estádio das Antas, Porto
Attendance: 31,429
Referee: Hartmut Strampe (Germany)

=== Group F ===
Pos	Team	Pld	W	D	L	GF	GA	GD	Pts	Qualification	BAR	LEV	LYO	FEN
1	(Spain) Barcelona	6	5	0	1	12	5	+7	15	Advance to second group stage	—	2–1	2–0	1–0
2	(Germany) Bayer Leverkusen	6	4	0	2	10	9	+1	12	Advance to second group stage	2–1	—	2–4	2–1
3	(France) Lyon	6	3	0	3	10	9	+1	9	Transfer to UEFA Cup	2–3	0–1	—	3–1
4	(Turkey) Fenerbahçe	6	0	0	6	3	12	−9	0		0–3	1–2	0–1	—

Source: RSSSF
18 September 2001
20:45

Lyon (France)	0–1	(Germany) Bayer Leverkusen
	Report	Kirsten 75'

Stade de Gerland, Lyon
Attendance: 37,006
Referee: Graziano Cesari (Italy)
18 September 2001
20:45

Fenerbahçe (Turkey)	0–3	(Spain) Barcelona
	Report	Kluivert 25'; Andersson 28'; Saviola 66'

Şükrü Saracoğlu Stadium, Istanbul
Attendance: 24,374
Referee: Anders Frisk (Sweden)

25 September 2001
20:45

Fenerbahçe (Turkey)	0–1	(France) Lyon
	Report	Delmotte 89'

Şükrü Saracoğlu Stadium, Istanbul
Attendance: 10,090
Referee: Frank De Bleeckere (Belgium)
25 September 2001
20:45

Bayer Leverkusen (Germany)	2–1	(Spain) Barcelona
Yıldıray Baştürk 52'; Neuville 69'	Report	Luis Enrique 22'

BayArena, Leverkusen
Attendance: 22,500
Referee: Hugh Dallas (Scotland)

10 October 2001
20:45

Bayer Leverkusen (Germany)	2–1	(Turkey) Fenerbahçe
Lúcio 36'; Ballack 59'	Report	Haim Revivo 6'

BayArena, Leverkusen
Attendance: 22,500
Referee: Alain Hamer (Luxembourg)
10 October 2001
20:45

Barcelona (Spain)	2–0	(France) Lyon
Kluivert 78'; Rivaldo 87' (pen.)	Report

Camp Nou, Barcelona
Attendance: 60,757
Referee: Kim Milton Nielsen (Denmark)

17 October 2001
20:45

Lyon (France)	3–1	(Turkey) Fenerbahçe
Govou 45+1'; Carrière 53'; Delmotte 68'	Report	Derelioğlu 35'

Stade de Gerland, Lyon
Attendance: 37,773
Referee: Konrad Plautz (Austria)
17 October 2001
20:45

Barcelona (Spain)	2–1	(Germany) Bayer Leverkusen
Kluivert 12'; Luis Enrique 38'	Report	Ramelow 32'

Camp Nou, Barcelona
Attendance: 60,432
Referee: Pierluigi Collina (Italy)

23 October 2001
20:45

Fenerbahçe (Turkey)	1–2	(Germany) Bayer Leverkusen
Derelioğlu 40'	Report	Schneider 21'; Kirsten 34'

Şükrü Saracoğlu Stadium, Istanbul
Attendance: 9,335
Referee: Terje Hauge (Norway)
23 October 2001
20:45

Lyon (France)	2–3	(Spain) Barcelona
Luyindula 66'; Carrière 88'	Report	Kluivert 9'; Rivaldo 18'; G. López 90+4'

Stade de Gerland, Lyon
Attendance: 37,800
Referee: Graham Poll (England)

31 October 2001
20:45

Bayer Leverkusen (Germany)	2–4	(France) Lyon
Sebescen 45+2'; Berbatov 52'	Report	Carrière 32', 38'; Née 64'; Govou 81'

BayArena, Leverkusen
Attendance: 22,500
Referee: Valentin Ivanov (Russia)
31 October 2001
20:45

Barcelona (Spain)	1–0	(Turkey) Fenerbahçe
Rivaldo 90+2'	Report

Camp Nou, Barcelona
Attendance: 35,233
Referee: Stuart Dougal (Scotland)

=== Group G ===
Pos	Team	Pld	W	D	L	GF	GA	GD	Pts	Qualification	DEP	MUN	LIL	OLY
1	(Spain) Deportivo La Coruña	6	2	4	0	10	8	+2	10	Advance to second group stage	—	2–1	1–1	2–2
2	(England) Manchester United	6	3	1	2	10	6	+4	10	Advance to second group stage	2–3	—	1–0	3–0
3	(France) Lille	6	1	3	2	7	7	0	6	Transfer to UEFA Cup	1–1	1–1	—	3–1
4	(Greece) Olympiacos	6	1	2	3	6	12	−6	5		1–1	0–2	2–1	—

Source: RSSSF
18 September 2001
20:45

Manchester United (England)	1–0	(France) Lille
Beckham 90'	Report

Old Trafford, Manchester
Attendance: 64,827
Referee: René Temmink (Netherlands)
18 September 2001
20:45

Deportivo La Coruña (Spain)	2–2	(Greece) Olympiacos
Fran 22'; Valerón 90+4'	Report	Giannakopoulos 80'; Ofori-Quaye 83'

Estadio Riazor, A Coruña
Attendance: 20,873
Referee: Jan Wegereef (Netherlands)

25 September 2001
20:45

Deportivo La Coruña (Spain)	2–1	(England) Manchester United
Pandiani 86'; Naybet 90'	Report	Scholes 40'

Estadio Riazor, A Coruña
Attendance: 32,928
Referee: Stefano Braschi (Italy)
25 September 2001
20:45

Lille (France)	3–1	(Greece) Olympiacos
Bakari 33'; Cheyrou 44'; Tafforeau 79'	Report	Giannakopoulos 90+1'

Stade Félix-Bollaert, Lens
Attendance: 35,777
Referee: Stuart Dougal (Scotland)

10 October 2001
20:45

Lille (France)	1–1	(Spain) Deportivo La Coruña
Olufade 87'	Report	Valerón 49'

Stade Félix-Bollaert, Lens
Attendance: 37,020
Referee: Claus Bo Larsen (Denmark)
10 October 2001
20:45

Olympiacos (Greece)	0–2	(England) Manchester United
	Report	Beckham 66'; Cole 82'

Olympic Stadium, Athens
Attendance: 71,528
Referee: Graziano Cesari (Italy)

17 October 2001
20:45

Manchester United (England)	2–3	(Spain) Deportivo La Coruña
Van Nistelrooy 7', 40'	Report	Sergio 37'; Tristán 39', 60'

Old Trafford, Manchester
Attendance: 65,585
Referee: Herbert Fandel (Germany)
17 October 2001
20:45

Olympiacos (Greece)	2–1	(France) Lille
Alexandris 53'; Niniadis 64'	Report	Bassir 38'

Olympic Stadium, Athens
Attendance: 25,755
Referee: Alfredo Trentalange (Italy)

23 October 2001
20:45

Deportivo La Coruña (Spain)	1–1	(France) Lille
Tristán 14' (pen.)	Report	Cheyrou 20' (pen.)

Estadio Riazor, A Coruña
Attendance: 22,983
Referee: Ľuboš Micheľ (Slovakia)
23 October 2001
20:45

Manchester United (England)	3–0	(Greece) Olympiacos
Solskjær 79'; Giggs 88'; Van Nistelrooy 90+4'	Report

Old Trafford, Manchester
Attendance: 66,769
Referee: Vítor Melo Pereira (Portugal)

31 October 2001
20:45

Lille (France)	1–1	(England) Manchester United
Cheyrou 65'	Report	Solskjær 6'

Stade Félix-Bollaert, Lens
Attendance: 38,402
Referee: Urs Meier (Switzerland)
31 October 2001
20:45

Olympiacos (Greece)	1–1	(Spain) Deportivo La Coruña
Alexandris 51'	Report	Capdevila 84'

Olympic Stadium, Athens
Attendance: 20,293
Referee: Markus Merk (Germany)

=== Group H ===
Pos	Team	Pld	W	D	L	GF	GA	GD	Pts	Qualification	BAY	SPP	FEY	SPM
1	(Germany) Bayern Munich	6	4	2	0	14	5	+9	14	Advance to second group stage	—	0–0	3–1	5–1
2	(Czech Republic) Sparta Prague	6	3	2	1	10	3	+7	11	Advance to second group stage	0–1	—	4–0	2–0
3	(Netherlands) Feyenoord	6	1	2	3	7	14	−7	5	Transfer to UEFA Cup	2–2	0–2	—	2–1
4	(Russia) Spartak Moscow	6	0	2	4	7	16	−9	2		1–3	2–2	2–2	—

Source: RSSSF
18 September 2001
18:00

Spartak Moscow (Russia)	2–2	(Netherlands) Feyenoord
Robson 62'; Beschastnykh 69'	Report	Bosvelt 12'; Tomasson 59'

Luzhniki Stadium, Moscow
Attendance: 15,000
Referee: Antonio López Nieto (Spain)
18 September 2001
20:45

Bayern Munich (Germany)	0–0	(Czech Republic) Sparta Prague
	Report

Olympic Stadium, Munich
Attendance: 16,000
Referee: Leslie Irvine (Northern Ireland)

25 September 2001
18:00

Spartak Moscow (Russia)	1–3	(Germany) Bayern Munich
Baranov 64'	Report	Salihamidžić 16'; Élber 41', 74'

Luzhniki Stadium, Moscow
Attendance: 37,000
Referee: Arturo Daudén Ibáñez (Spain)
25 September 2001
20:45

Sparta Prague (Czech Republic)	4–0	(Netherlands) Feyenoord
Hartig 24'; Labant 38' (pen.); Kincl 71'; Michalík 74'	Report

AXA Arena, Prague
Attendance: 15,150
Referee: Fritz Stuchlik (Austria)

10 October 2001
20:45

Sparta Prague (Czech Republic)	2–0	(Russia) Spartak Moscow
Kincl 57'; Sionko 88'	Report

AXA Arena, Prague
Attendance: 17,221
Referee: Éric Poulat (France)
10 October 2001
20:45

Feyenoord (Netherlands)	2–2	(Germany) Bayern Munich
Van Hooijdonk 38'; Tomasson 45+1'	Report	Élber 13', 50'

De Kuip, Rotterdam
Attendance: 39,122
Referee: Gilles Veissière (France)

17 October 2001
20:45

Bayern Munich (Germany)	5–1	(Russia) Spartak Moscow
Pizarro 7', 22'; Élber 33', 52'; Zickler 90+1'	Report	Beschastnykh 58'

Olympic Stadium, Munich
Attendance: 19,000
Referee: Frank De Bleeckere (Belgium)
17 October 2001
20:45

Feyenoord (Netherlands)	0–2	(Czech Republic) Sparta Prague
	Report	Jarošík 43'; Novotný 78'

De Kuip, Rotterdam
Attendance: 37,200
Referee: Arturo Daudén Ibáñez (Spain)

23 October 2001
18:00

Spartak Moscow (Russia)	2–2	(Czech Republic) Sparta Prague
Robson 4'; Beschastnykh 34'	Report	Holub 29'; Babnič 90+3'

Luzhniki Stadium, Moscow
Attendance: 5,300
Referee: Graham Barber (England)
23 October 2001
20:45

Bayern Munich (Germany)	3–1	(Netherlands) Feyenoord
Van Gobbel 12' (o.g.); Santa Cruz 30', 90+1'	Report	Elmander 25'

Olympic Stadium, Munich
Attendance: 40,000
Referee: Lucílio Batista (Portugal)

31 October 2001
20:45

Sparta Prague (Czech Republic)	0–1	(Germany) Bayern Munich
	Report	Novotný 40' (o.g.)

AXA Arena, Prague
Attendance: 19,396
Referee: Alain Hamer (Luxembourg)
31 October 2001
20:45

Feyenoord (Netherlands)	2–1	(Russia) Spartak Moscow
Tomasson 5'; Elmander 18'	Report	Beschastnykh 14'

De Kuip, Rotterdam
Attendance: 35,400
Referee: Graziano Cesari (Italy)
