= Alexandre Vilacova =

Portuguese footballer

Alexandre
Personal information
- Full name: João Alexandre Santos Vilacova
- Date of birth: 29 November 1973 (age 52)
- Place of birth: Porto, Portugal
- Height: 1.89 m (6 ft 2 in)
- Position: Centre-back

Youth career
- 1983–1992: Varzim

Senior career*
| Years | Team | Apps | (Gls) |
| 1992–2009 | Varzim | 455 | (7) |
| 2009–2011 | Esposende | 30 | (0) |
| Total | | 485 | (7) |

Managerial career
- 2011–2013: Esposende
- 2014: Varzim
- * Club domestic league appearances and goals

João Alexandre Santos Vilacova (born 29 November 1973), known as Alexandre, is a Portuguese former professional footballer who played as a central defender.

== Club career ==
Alexandre was born in Porto. Brought through the ranks of Varzim SC, he only knew one club throughout his professional career, which spanned almost two decades, also being the Póvoa de Varzim-based side's longtime captain. Almost always in the starting XI, he played three editions of the Primeira Liga with them (totalling 89 matches and going scoreless in the process), but spent the vast majority of his career in the Segunda Liga.

For 2009–10, after 26 years at the Estádio do Varzim SC, Alexandre signed with A.D. Esposende of the Braga regional leagues, helping it return to the fourth division in his first season. He began his coaching career precisely with the latter team.

In January 2014, Alexandre was named interim manager at Varzim after the third-tier side dismissed José Augusto due to poor results. He then worked with the club as director of football, leaving his post on 15 June 2019.
