= Joca (footballer, born 1981) =

Portuguese footballer

Personal information
- Full name: Ricardo Jorge Silva Pinto Pereira
- Date of birth: 4 March 1981 (age 45)
- Place of birth: Porto, Portugal
- Height: 1.79 m (5 ft 10 1/2 in)
- Position: Defensive midfielder

Youth career
- 1990–1993: Boavista
- 1993–1997: Senhora da Hora
- 1997–1999: Porto

Senior career*
Years	Team	Apps	(Gls)
1999–2002	Porto B	86	(6)
2002–2004	Porto	2	(0)
2002–2003	→ Vitória Setúbal (loan)	8	(0)
2003–2004	→ Gil Vicente (loan)	1	(0)
2004–2005	Santa Clara	11	(0)
2005–2006	Dragões Sandinenses	25	(3)
2006–2007	Ethnikos	5	(0)
2007	Qingdao Zhongneng		
2007–2009	AEL Limassol	33	(2)
2009–2010	Ermis	15	(0)
2010–2011	Lorca Atlético	8	(0)
2011	PAEEK	9	(1)
2012	Dhofar		
2012–2013	Oliveirense	15	(0)
2013–2014	Espinho	17	(1)
Total		235	(13)

International career
2000–2001	Portugal U20	11	(0)
2002	Portugal U21	2	(0)

Managerial career
- 2014–2015: Espinho (assistant)
- * Club domestic league appearances and goals

Ricardo Jorge Silva Pinto Pereira (born 4 March 1981 in Porto), known as Joca, is a Portuguese retired professional footballer who played as a defensive midfielder.
