= Pedro Neves (footballer, born 1981) =

Portuguese footballer

Personal information
- Full name: Pedro Paulo Pinheiro Neves
- Date of birth: 6 October 1981 (age 45)
- Place of birth: Santa Iría de Azóia, Portugal
- Height: 1.75 m (5 ft 9 in)
- Positions: Defender; midfielder

Youth career
- Santa Iria
- Sporting
- Alverca

Senior career*
Years	Team	Apps	(Gls)
1998-2005	Alverca	81	(3)
2006	La Tour/Le Pâquier		
2007-2008	Torreense	25	(1)
2008-2009	Bylis		
2009-2010	Odivelas	21	(5)
2010-2011	Praiense	20	(4)
2011-2012	Pinhalnovense	32	(3)
2013-2014	Sacavenense	42	(7)
2014-2016	Lusitano VRSA	55	(7)
2016-2018	Moncarapachense	18+	(2+)
- * Club domestic league appearances and goals

Pedro Paulo Pinheiro Neves (born 6 October 1981) is a Portuguese former footballer who is last known to have played as a defender or midfielder for Moncarapachense.

== Career ==
As a youth player, Neves joined the youth academy of Sporting, one of Portugal's most successful clubs.

He started his career with Alverca in the Portuguese top flight.

In 2006, Neves signed for Swiss fourth division side La Tour/Le Pâquier from Peniche in the Portuguese third division.

In 2008, he signed for Albanian team Bylis.

In 2016, he signed for Moncarapachense in the Portuguese fourth division.
