= 2001–02 in Portuguese football =

This is a list of Portuguese football statistics for the 2001–2002 season, including the 2001–02 Primeira Liga, the 68th edition of the top flight of Portuguese soccer.

== Primeira Liga ==
Pos	Team	Pld	W	D	L	GF	GA	GD	Pts	Qualification or relegation
1	Sporting CP (C)	34	22	9	3	74	25	+49	75	Qualification to Champions League third qualifying round
2	Boavista	34	21	7	6	53	20	+33	70	Qualification to Champions League second qualifying round
3	Porto	34	21	5	8	66	34	+32	68	Qualification to UEFA Cup first round
4	Benfica	34	17	12	5	66	37	+29	63	Qualification to UEFA Cup first round
5	Belenenses	34	17	6	11	54	44	+10	57	Qualification to Intertoto Cup second round
6	Marítimo	34	17	5	12	48	35	+13	56	
7	União de Leiria	34	15	10	9	52	35	+17	55	Qualification to Intertoto Cup first round
8	Paços de Ferreira	34	12	10	12	41	44	−3	46	
9	Vitória de Guimarães	34	11	9	14	35	41	−6	42	
10	Braga	34	10	12	12	43	43	0	42	
11	Beira-Mar	34	10	9	15	48	56	−8	39	
12	Gil Vicente	34	10	8	16	42	56	−14	38	
13	Vitória de Setúbal	34	9	11	14	40	46	−6	38	
14	Santa Clara	34	9	10	15	32	46	−14	37	Qualification to Intertoto Cup first round
15	Varzim	34	8	8	18	27	55	−28	32	
16	Salgueiros (R)	34	8	6	20	29	71	−42	30	Relegation to Segunda Liga
17	Farense (R)	34	7	7	20	29	63	−34	28	Relegation to Segunda Liga
18	Alverca (R)	34	7	6	21	39	67	−28	27	Relegation to Segunda Liga

Source: Primeira Divisão
Rules for classification: 1) points; 2) head-to-head points; 3) head-to-head goal difference; 4) goal difference; 5) number of goals scored
(C) Champions; (R) Relegated
