= Gilmar (footballer, born 1973) =

Brazilian footballer

Personal information
- Full name: Gilmar Lobato da Rocha
- Date of birth: 17 October 1973 (age 53)
- Place of birth: Natal, Brazil
- Height: 1.80 m (5 ft 11 in)
- Position: Midfielder

Senior career*
Years	Team	Apps	(Gls)
1996	Alecrim		
1996–1997	Vianense	21	(1)
1997–2000	Espinho	74	(10)
2000–2005	Varzim	142	(14)
2005–2010	Naval	87	(1)
Total		324	(26)
- * Club domestic league appearances and goals

Gilmar Lobato da Rocha (born 17 October 1973 in Natal, Rio Grande do Norte), known simply as Gilmar, is a Brazilian retired footballer who played as a central midfielder. He also held Portuguese citizenship, due to the many years spent in the country (14 seasons in representation of four teams).

In Portugal's Primeira Liga, Gilmar amassed totals of 142 games and five goals, with Varzim SC (two seasons) and Associação Naval 1º de Maio (five, even though he did not appear in his last one).
