= Cândido Costa =

Portuguese footballer

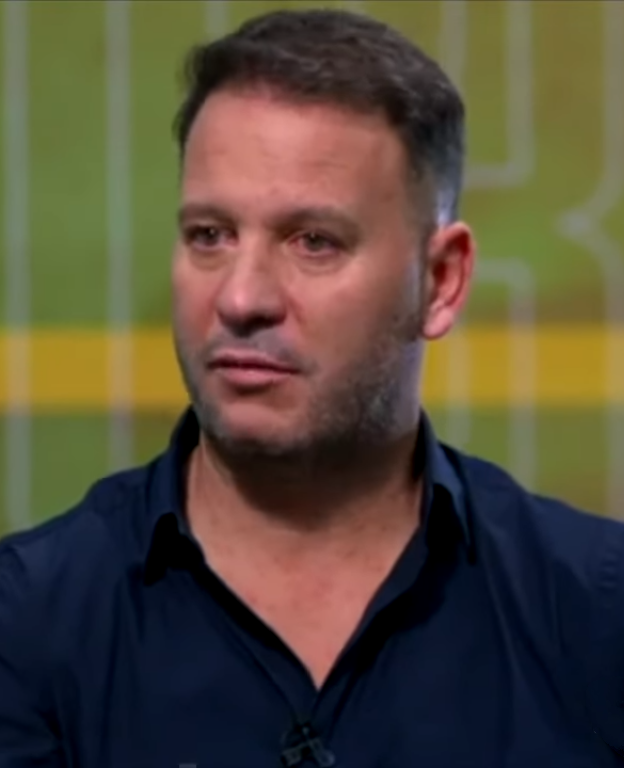
- Costa in 2024

Personal information
- Full name: Cândido Alves Moreira da Costa
- Date of birth: 30 April 1981 (age 45)
- Place of birth: São João da Madeira, Portugal
- Height: 1.78 m (5 ft 10 in)
- Positions: Winger; right-back

Youth career
- 1990–1996: Sanjoanense
- 1996–1999: Benfica

Senior career*
Years	Team	Apps	(Gls)
1999	Salgueiros	9	(0)
2000–2001	Porto B	19	(2)
2000–2004	Porto	33	(3)
2003	→ Vitória Setúbal (loan)	12	(0)
2003–2004	→ Derby County (loan)	34	(1)
2004–2006	Braga	29	(0)
2006–2010	Belenenses	79	(1)
2010–2011	Rapid București	12	(0)
2011–2012	Arouca	0	(0)
2012	Tondela	2	(0)
2013–2014	São João Ver	12	(0)
2014–2015	Ovarense	17	(2)
Total		258	(9)

International career
1997	Portugal U15	6	(1)
1996–1998	Portugal U16	14	(2)
1998	Portugal U17	8	(0)
1998–1999	Portugal U18	18	(5)
2001	Portugal U20	4	(1)
2000–2004	Portugal U21	25	(4)
- * Club domestic league appearances and goals

Cândido Alves Moreira da Costa (born 30 April 1981) is a Portuguese former professional footballer who played as a right winger or right-back.

He achieved Primeira Liga totals of 162 games and four goals over ten seasons, representing in the competition Salgueiros, Porto, Vitória de Setúbal, Braga and Belenenses. He also played in England and Romania.

Costa later worked in television.

== Club career ==
=== Porto ===
Costa was born in São João da Madeira, Aveiro District. Having finished his formative years at S.L. Benfica, he joined FC Porto following a brief stint with S.C. Salgueiros (where he made his Primeira Liga debut, in 1999–2000). In his first full season at Porto, 2000–01, he contributed 18 games and two goals, but the title was lost in the penultimate round to neighbours Boavista FC.

Costa was barely used in the 2002–03 title-winning side under José Mourinho, but played twice in the final win of the UEFA Cup, including the entirety of an inconsequential 2–0 away loss against Polonia Warsaw in the second leg of the first round.

At the start of 2003, Costa was loaned to Vitória F.C. for the remainder of the season. In July, also on loan, he signed with Football League First Division club Derby County for the 2003–04 campaign. He was sent off before half-time on 25 August for a foul on Richard Langley in a 4–1 defeat at Cardiff City; over 35 appearances, he scored once in a 1–1 draw away to West Bromwich Albion on 26 December.

=== Braga and Belenenses ===
Costa joined S.C. Braga in 2004–05, on a three-year contract with the option of two more. Having started his career as a winger, he agreed to a deal at C.F. Os Belenenses for the 2006–07 season, ultimately reconverting into the right-back position and becoming an undisputed starter for the Lisbon-based team, scoring against F.C. Paços de Ferreira on 18 March 2007 in a 2–0 away win.

=== Later career ===
After only appearing in 11 matches in the 2009–10 season due to constant injuries, with Belenenses returning to the Segunda Liga, the 29-year-old Costa had his second abroad experience, signing with Liga I side FC Rapid București on a one-year deal with the option of one more. He returned to his country's second division at F.C. Arouca in July 2011, but suffered an anterior cruciate ligament injury in his right knee days later, and was unused by the time of his one-year transfer to C.D. Tondela of the same league on 29 June 2012.

In February 2013, Costa moved to SC São João de Ver in the third tier; he reunited with Ricardo Sousa, a former Porto teammate from his hometown. He joined amateurs A.D. Ovarense in July of the following year.

== After football ==
After retiring, Costa was sales manager at OHM Técnica, a company based in Fiães (Santa Maria da Feira). During this timeframe, he occasionally acted as a pundit for Televisão Independente.

Costa later became a television personality, with consistent appearances on channels such as Canal 11, Porto Canal and RTP1. In an interview to one of these shows, Alta Definição, broadcast on 13 January 2024 by Sociedade Independente de Comunicação, he recalled a period of his life when he was unemployed after he stopped playing football professionally, stating: "I realised that celebrating life and being happy is as much about playing in the Champions League in a match with 60,000 people as it is about being appointed delegate in an IEFP [Portuguese state-run job agency] class."

== Honours ==
Porto

- Primeira Liga: 2002–03
- Taça de Portugal: 2000–01, 2002–03
- UEFA Cup: 2002–03
- Supertaça Cândido de Oliveira runner-up: 2000
