= Renato Jorge =

Portuguese footballer (born 1973)

Renato
Personal information
- Full name: Renato Jorge Magalhães Dias Assunção
- Date of birth: 21 January 1973 (age 53)
- Place of birth: Porto, Portugal
- Height: 1.78 m (5 ft 10 in)
- Position: Defender

Senior career*
Years	Team	Apps	(Gls)
1991–1998	Salgueiros	141	(2)
1998	Sporting	11	(0)
1999	Vitória de Setúbal	1	(0)
1999–2003	União de Leiria	126	(1)
2003–2004	Leixões	13	(0)
2004–2008	União de Leiria	93	(4)
2008–2009	Salgueiros		

International career
	Portugal U21	1	(0)

Managerial career
- 2009–2010: Salgueiros (U19 B)
- 2010–2011: Coimbrões (U19)
- 2012–2013: Salgueiros (U19)
- 2013–2015: Salgueiros (technical coordinator)
- 2017–2019: Sousense (U17)
- 2019–2020: Sousense
- * Club domestic league appearances and goals

Renato Jorge Magalhães Dias Assunção, known as Renato (born 21 January 1973) is a Portuguese football coach and a former player.

He played 17 seasons and 372 games in the Primeira Liga for União de Leiria, Salgueiros, Sporting and Vitória de Setúbal.

== Career ==
Renato made his Primeira Liga debut for Salgueiros on 22 September 1991 as a half-time substitute in a 1–1 draw with Boavista.
