= Mariano (footballer, born 1975) =

Portuguese footballer

Personal information
- Full name: Carlos Alberto Teixeira Mariano
- Date of birth: 21 November 1975 (age 50)
- Place of birth: Porto, Portugal
- Height: 1.73 m (5 ft 8 in)
- Positions: Defender; midfielder

Youth career
- 1985–1994: Porto

Senior career*
Years	Team	Apps	(Gls)
1994–1995	Sporting Espinho	7	(0)
1995–1997	Salgueiros	34	(0)
1997–1998	Varzim	15	(0)
1998–2001	Marítimo	70	(7)
2001–2003	Varzim	43	(1)
2003–2005	Penafiel	43	(0)
2005–2007	Santa Clara	8	(0)
2007–2008	Zamora	16	(0)
2008	Lanzarote		
2009–2012	Padroense	95	(6)

International career
1993–1994	Portugal U-18	9	(0)
1995–1996	Portugal U-20	14	(0)
1996	Portugal U-21	4	(0)
Medal record
Men's football
Representing Portugal
FIFA U-20 World Cup
Third place	1995 Qatar
- * Club domestic league appearances and goals

Carlos Alberto Teixeira Mariano, known as Mariano (born 21 November 1975) is a former Portuguese football player.

He played 9 seasons and 183 games in the Primeira Liga for Marítimo, Varzim, Salgueiros and Penafiel.

== Club career ==
He made his Primeira Liga debut for Salgueiros on 27 August 1995 in a game against União Leiria.

== Honours ==
Portugal Under-18

- UEFA European Under-18 Championship: 1994
