= Fredrik Söderström =

Swedish footballer

Personal information
- Full name: Sven Olof Fredrik Söderström
- Date of birth: 30 January 1973 (age 53)
- Place of birth: Ludvika, Sweden
- Height: 1.77 m (5 ft 10 in)
- Position: Midfielder

Youth career
- Östansbo IS

Senior career*
Years	Team	Apps	(Gls)
1992–1996	Brage	77	(19)
1997–2001	Vitória Guimarães	129	(11)
2001–2004	Porto	24	(0)
2002–2003	→ Standard Liège (loan)	29	(1)
2003–2004	→ Braga (loan)	31	(3)
2004	→ Estrela Amadora (loan)	12	(0)
2005–2007	Córdoba	46	(0)
2007	→ Lanzarote (loan)	14	(0)
2007–2008	Lanzarote	25	(3)
2008–2010	Hammarby	42	(2)
Total		429	(39)

International career
1998–2002	Sweden	5	(0)
- * Club domestic league appearances and goals

Sven Olof Fredrik Söderström (born 30 January 1973) is a Swedish former professional footballer who played as a midfielder. Starting off his career with IK Brage, he went on to play professionally in Portugal, Belgium, and Spain before retiring at Hammarby IF in 2010. A full international between 1998 and 2002, he won five caps for the Sweden national team.

== Club career ==
Born in Ludvika, Söderström started his professional career with lowly IK Brage. In January 1997 he moved to Vitória de Guimarães in Portugal, where his stellar performances attracted the attention of fellow Primeira Liga club FC Porto.

Söderström played 24 matches in his first season, but went on to serve consecutive loans for the remainder of his contract, mainly in that nation, as the northerners achieved consecutive European competition accolades. In January 2005, at 32 and having appeared in more than 200 overall games in Portugal, he left for Spain where he represented Córdoba CF and UD Lanzarote, in the second and third levels respectively. He returned to his country in 2008 after 11 years, signing with Hammarby.

Söderström announced his retirement from football on 20 February 2011 at the age of nearly 38, after being released by Hammarby on a free transfer.

== International career ==
Söderström played five games for the Sweden national team over a period of four years, but never appeared in any major international tournament. He earned his first cap on 2 June 1998, starting and featuring 62 minutes in a 1–0 friendly win against Italy in Gothenburg before being replaced by Andreas Andersson.

== Career statistics ==
=== International ===
Appearances and goals by national team and year
National team	Year	Apps	Goals
Sweden	1998	1	0
Sweden	1999	1	0
Sweden	2000	0	0
Sweden	2001	2	0
Sweden	2002	1	0
Total		5	0
