= Arbën Nuhiji =

Footballer

Arben Nuhiu
Personal information
- Full name: Arben Nuhiu; Арбен Нухии
- Date of birth: 27 February 1972 (age 54)
- Place of birth: Skopje, Yugoslavia
- Height: 1.75 m (5 ft 9 in)
- Position: Forward

Senior career*
Years	Team	Apps	(Gls)
1992–1994	Shkëndija		
1994–1995	Sloga Jugomagnat	3	(1)
1995–1997	Hajduk Split	2	(0)
1997–2000	Beveren	54	(14)
2000–2005	Sloga Jugomagnat	94	(43)
2001–2002	→ Yozgatspor (loan)	12	(1)
2005–2006	Vardar	26	(3)
2006–2007	Besa Kavajë	23	(3)
2008	Elbasani	16	(2)
2008–2009	Shkëndija		
2009–2010	Vardar	8	(1)

International career
2000–2005	Macedonia	5	(2)
- * Club domestic league appearances and goals

Arben Nuhiu (Macedonian: Арбен Нухии) (born 27 February 1972) is an association footballer from North Macedonia, who finished his club career with Vardar. He is an ethnic Albanian.

== International career ==
He made his senior debut for Macedonia in a June 2000 friendly match against South Korea and has earned a total of 5 caps, scoring 2 goals. His final international was a November 2005 friendly against Liechtenstein.
