= Mário Silva (footballer) =

Portuguese football player and manager

Personal information
- Full name: Mário Fernando Magalhães da Silva
- Date of birth: 24 April 1977 (age 49)
- Place of birth: Porto, Portugal
- Height: 1.79 m (5 ft 10 in)
- Position: Left-back

Youth career
- 1986–1988: Bom Pastor
- 1988–1995: Boavista

Senior career*
Years	Team	Apps	(Gls)
1995–2000	Boavista	88	(2)
2000–2001	Nantes	20	(0)
2001–2004	Porto	34	(0)
2004–2005	Recreativo	23	(0)
2005–2006	Cádiz	7	(0)
2006–2008	Boavista	27	(0)
2009	Doxa	3	(1)
Total		202	(3)

International career
1992	Portugal U15	3	(0)
1992–1993	Portugal U16	14	(0)
1993	Portugal U17	3	(0)
1994	Portugal U18	9	(0)
1995	Portugal U20	6	(0)
1996–1999	Portugal U21	13	(1)
2001	Portugal B	3	(0)
2002	Portugal	1	(0)

Managerial career
- 2010–2011: Boavista U19
- 2010–2011: Boavista (assistant)
- 2011: Boavista
- 2012–2013: Porto U17 (assistant)
- 2013–2017: Padroense
- 2017–2018: Porto U17
- 2018–2019: Porto U19
- 2020: Almería
- 2020: Rio Ave
- 2022–2023: Santa Clara
- 2024–2026: Al-Najma
- 2026: Buriram United
Medal record
Men's football
Representing Portugal
FIFA U-20 World Cup
Third place	1995 Qatar
- * Club domestic league appearances and goals

Mário Fernando Magalhães da Silva (born 24 April 1977; Portuguese pronunciation: [ˈmaɾiu ˈsilvɐ]) is a Portuguese former professional footballer who played as a left-back. He is currently a manager.

== Playing career ==
Silva was born in Porto. Having grown through the ranks of local Boavista he went on to represent Nantes, Porto, Recreativo de Huelva and Cádiz, returning to Boavista in June 2006 and leaving after two seasons due to unpaid wages, in a litigation that would only be concluded in March 2010.

Silva enjoyed his best years while with Porto, playing second fiddle to Nuno Valente on a side that won the 2002–03 UEFA Cup and the following campaign's UEFA Champions League while also adding back-to-back Primeira Liga titles under José Mourinho. Also at the club, on 27 March 2002, he earned his sole cap for the Portugal national team, appearing in a 4–1 friendly home defeat against Finland.

Midway through 2008–09, Silva moved countries again and joined Doxa Katokopias of the Cypriot First Division. However, he was released after only a couple of months, and retired in the summer after not being able to find a new team.

== Coaching career ==
In 2010, Silva began working as a manager, acting as both youth and assistant coach in Boavista (the latter already in the main squad). In June of the following year, with the team still in the third division, he was appointed as Filipe Gouveia's successor.

Silva resigned from his position just five months into the season, citing lack of payment as the reason for his departure. He subsequently returned to Porto, going on to act as manager for several youth sides and leading the under-19s to the 2018–19 UEFA Youth League; he was, however, replaced by Tulipa shortly after.

In September 2019, Silva was appointed director of academy at Spanish Segunda División club Almería, where his compatriot Pedro Emanuel was the coach. The following 26 June, he took the reins of the main squad until the end of the campaign, but was dismissed on 27 July just before the start of the promotion play-offs.

Days after leaving Spain, Silva was given his first top-flight job in his country, replacing Carlos Carvalhal at Rio Ave. In the Europa League, the team were eliminated in the playoffs by AC Milan after conceding an equaliser in the last minute of extra time and losing 9–8 on penalties. He left on 30 December 2020 with them in 13th.

Silva became Santa Clara's fourth manager of the season on 10 January 2022, signing a short-term contract. He concluded the campaign in seventh place and signed a new deal until 2024, but was sacked near the anniversary of his appointment, with the Azoreans in 15th position after as many games.

On 7 July 2024, Silva was appointed at Saudi First Division League's Al-Najma. He achieved promotion to the Pro League in his debut campaign, finishing second to Neom; on 8 February 2026, however, having collected just five points from 20 matches and with his side in last place, he was relieved of his duties.

On 8 September 2026, Silva became head coach of Thai League 1 club Buriram United.

== Managerial statistics ==
As of match played 28 October 2026

Managerial record by team and tenure
Team	Nat.	From	To	Record								Ref.
Team	Nat.	From	To	G	W	D	L	GF	GA	GD	Win %	Ref.
Boavista	(Portugal)	15 June 2011	9 November 2011	8	5	2	1	11	3	+8	62.50	
Almería	(Spain)	26 June 2020	27 July 2020	7	2	2	3	8	9	−1	28.57	
Rio Ave	(Portugal)	3 August 2020	30 December 2020	16	5	7	4	15	18	−3	31.25	
Santa Clara	(Portugal)	10 January 2022	6 January 2023	38	8	14	16	39	51	−12	21.05	
Al-Najma	(Saudi Arabia)	7 July 2024	8 February 2026	58	22	10	26	76	77	−1	37.93	
Buriram United	(Thailand)	8 September 2026	30 October 2026	10	4	4	2	18	9	+9	40.00	
Career Total				137	46	39	52	167	167	+0	33.58	

== Honours ==
=== Player ===
Boavista

- Taça de Portugal: 1996–97
- Supertaça Cândido de Oliveira: 1997

Nantes

- Ligue 1: 2000–01

Porto

- Primeira Liga: 2002–03, 2003–04
- Taça de Portugal: 2002–03
- Supertaça Cândido de Oliveira: 2001
- UEFA Champions League: 2003–04
- UEFA Cup: 2002–03

Portugal

- UEFA European Under-18 Championship: 1994
