= Bruno Fernandes (footballer, born 1974) =

Portuguese footballer

Bruno
Personal information
- Full name: Bruno Marcelo Pereira Fernandes
- Date of birth: 30 June 1974 (age 52)
- Place of birth: Funchal, Portugal
- Height: 1.75 m (5 ft 9 in)
- Position: Midfielder

Youth career
- 1986–1989: União Madeira
- 1989–1993: Marítimo

Senior career*
Years	Team	Apps	(Gls)
1993–2002	Marítimo	107	(4)
1993–1994	→ Camacha (loan)	13	(0)
1995–1997	→ Machico (loan)	57	(4)
2002–2004	Porto	1	(0)
2003	→ Marítimo (loan)	7	(0)
2003–2004	→ Moreirense (loan)	17	(0)
2004–2007	Nacional	83	(7)
2007–2010	Marítimo	68	(10)
2011–2013	União Madeira	57	(8)
2015–2017	Bairro Argentina	21	(8)
Total		431	(41)
- * Club domestic league appearances and goals

Bruno Marcelo Pereira Fernandes (born 30 June 1974), known simply as Bruno, is a Portuguese former professional footballer who played as a central midfielder.

In a 24-year senior career, he played for two clubs in his native region, Marítimo and Nacional, also representing Porto albeit with no success. He amassed Primeira Liga totals of 283 games and 21 goals.

== Club career ==
A graduate of local C.S. Marítimo's youth academy, Bruno was born in Funchal, and he made his debut with the first team in 1993 at the age of 19, but was soon loaned to Madeira neighbours A.D. Camacha. In the following seasons he worked his way into his hometown club's starting XI, and soon became a fan favourite in the role of playmaker; his goal against Leeds United in the 2001–02 UEFA Cup, a thundering 45-yard free kick, enabled for a 1–0 victory against the English (who eventually won 3–1 on aggregate).

Subsequently, many top European clubs became interested in Bruno, as he earned a trial with Premier League's Newcastle United which eventually fell through, and he stayed in Portugal, joining Primeira Liga side FC Porto on a three-year contract in April 2002. However, the dream move proved to be a nightmare and he was loaned out to Marítimo during the second part of the season and to Moreirense F.C. for the entire following campaign, before signing for Marítimo neighbours C.D. Nacional in 2004–05.

After three seasons – in his first, he scored in a 4–2 away win over Sporting CP on 22 May 2005– which included two more UEFA Cup participations that brought first-round exits against Sevilla FC and FC Rapid București, Bruno re-signed for a third spell with boyhood club Marítimo, on a free transfer. After having contributed 18 matches and two goals to a sixth-place finish in 2009–10, thus returning to the Europa League, the 36-year-old retired.

In the 2011 off-season, after one year out of football, Bruno returned to active with another side in Madeira, C.F. União. He only missed seven league matches during the season, as the team finally retained their Segunda Liga status.

== Honours ==
Porto

- Primeira Liga: 2002–03
- Taça de Portugal: 2002–03
- UEFA Cup: 2002–03
