= Lee Phillips (footballer, born 1979) =

Welsh footballer and manager

Personal information
- Date of birth: 18 March 1979 (age 47)
- Place of birth: Aberdare, Wales
- Position: Full back

Senior career*
Years	Team	Apps	(Gls)
1996–2000	Cardiff City	16	(0)
2000–2003	Barry Town	93	(10)
2003–2004	Forest Green Rovers	21	(2)
2004–2005	Newport County	44	(3)
2005–2008	Llanelli	79	(3)
2008	Port Talbot Town	0	(0)
2008–2010	Llanelli	43	(5)
2010–2011	Carmarthen Town	0	(0)
2011	Aberaman Athletic	16	(0)

International career
- Wales Semi-Pro

Managerial career
- 2011–2014: Aberdare Town
- 2020-2022: Blaenrhonnda AFC (Assistant)
- 2022-–: AFC Llwydcoed
- * Club domestic league appearances and goals

Lee Phillips (born 18 March 1979, in Aberdare) is a Welsh-born former footballer who manages A.F.C. Llwydcoed

== Career ==
Phillips began his career at Cardiff City, making his debut in a 3–2 win over Hartlepool United in February 1997 as a replacement for Scott Young. During the following years he found opportunities hard to come by at the club before moving on to League of Wales outfit Barry Town in 2000 where he made just under 100 appearances including some appearances in European competition.

He then moved to Football Conference side Forest Green Rovers before returning to Wales to sign for Newport County. In June 2005 he signed for Llanelli, captaining them to the league title before joining Port Talbot Athletic in June 2008. However, he made a controversial return to Llanelli just 27 days later. In August 2010, he joined Carmarthen Town.
