= Rafael (footballer, born 1974) =

Brazilian footballer (born 1961)

Personal information
- Full name: Rafael Gustavo Dias
- Date of birth: 3 June 1974 (age 52)
- Place of birth: Porto Alegre, Brazil
- Height: 1.81 m (5 ft 11 in)
- Position: Forward

Senior career*
Years	Team	Apps	(Gls)
1999	Ypiranga		
1999–2001	Paços de Ferreira	46	(18)
2001–2002	Porto	11	(1)
2002–2005	Vitória de Guimarães	53	(7)
2006	Esportivo		
2006	São José		
2007	Novo Hamburgo		
2008	Porto Alegre		
- * Club domestic league appearances and goals

Rafael Gustavo Dias (born 3 June 1974) is a Brazilian former professional footballer who played as a forward.

== Early life ==
Rafael was born in 1974 in Porto Alegre, Brazil. He played beach football as a child.

== Career ==
Rafael started his career with Brazilian side Ypiranga. In 1999, he signed for Portuguese side Paços de Ferreira. He scored seventeen goals for the club during the 2000/01 season. In 2001, he signed for Portuguese side Porto. In 2002, he signed for Portuguese side Vitória de Guimarães. In 2006, he signed for Brazilian side Esportivo. After that, he signed for Brazilian side São José. In 2007, he signed for Brazilian side Novo Hamburgo. In 2008, he signed for Brazilian side Porto Alegre.

== Style of play ==
Rafael mainly operated as a forward. He was regarded as an attacking midfielder option while playing for Porto.

== Personal life ==
Rafael has been married. He has an autistic son.
