= Clayton (footballer, born 1975) =

Brazilian footballer

Personal information
- Full name: Clayton Ferreira Cruz
- Date of birth: 19 July 1975 (age 51)
- Place of birth: São João do Paraíso, Brazil
- Height: 1.76 m (5 ft 9 in)
- Position: Forward

Senior career*
Years	Team	Apps	(Gls)
1994–1998	Atlético Mineiro	52	(4)
1997	→ Guarani (loan)	4	(0)
1998–1999	América-RJ	0	(0)
1999	Santa Clara	12	(8)
1999–2003	Porto	74	(11)
2003–2005	Sporting CP	8	(0)
2004–2005	→ Penafiel (loan)	29	(5)
2005	Vitória Guimarães	6	(0)
2006	Sport Recife	2	(0)
2006–2007	Penafiel	21	(3)
2007–2008	Alki Larnaca	21	(9)
2008	Omonia	9	(1)
2009–2010	AEL Limassol	36	(9)
2011–2012	Serrano-BA	13	(1)
Total		287	(51)
- * Club domestic league appearances and goals

Clayton Ferreira Cruz (born 19 July 1975), known simply as Clayton, is a Brazilian former professional footballer. A forward or winger, he operated preferably on the left.

His 16-year professional career was spent, other than in his country, in Portugal – five teams represented, mainly Porto with which he won five major titles, including one Primeira Liga championship and one UEFA Cup – and Cyprus (three clubs).

== Football career ==
Clayton was born in São João do Paraíso, Minas Gerais. After a solid career in native Brazil, mainly with Clube Atlético Mineiro, he moved to Portugal in 1999, joining Azores' C.D. Santa Clara.

In December 1999, Clayton signed for fellow Primeira Liga club FC Porto, and went on to become an important attacking element. On 25 May of the following year, in the replay match of the final of the Taça de Portugal, he was directly involved in both of his team's goals in a 2–0 win over Sporting CP.

On 17 October 2001, in the season's UEFA Champions League, Clayton scored a brace against Celtic in a 3–0 home triumph. He was also a part of the UEFA Cup-winning side in 2002–03, although he did not play in the final against the same opponent.

For 2003–04, Clayton moved to Sporting. After appearing scarcely throughout the campaign he was loaned to lowly F.C. Penafiel, representing Vitória S.C. subsequently.

After another Brazil spell with Sport Club do Recife, and another season at Penafiel (now in the Portuguese second level), Clayton moved to Cyprus. Starting 2007–08 with Alki Larnaca FC, he joined AC Omonia in the following January transfer window.

In January 2009, Clayton moved teams in the same country, signing with AEL Limassol. He returned to Brazil aged 35, playing the remainder of his career in amateur football.

== Honours ==
Porto

- Primeira Liga: 2002–03
- Taça de Portugal: 1999–00, 2000–01, 2002–03
- Supertaça Cândido de Oliveira: 2001; Runner-up 2000
- UEFA Cup: 2002–03

AEL

- Cypriot Cup: Runner-up 2008–09
