= Pena (footballer) =

Brazilian footballer

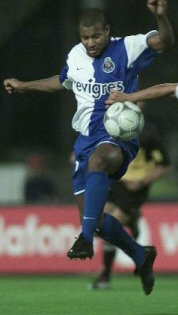
- Pena in action for Porto

Personal information
- Full name: Renivaldo Pereira de Jesus
- Date of birth: 19 February 1974 (age 52)
- Place of birth: Vitória da Conquista, Brazil
- Height: 1.78 m (5 ft 10 in)
- Position: Striker

Senior career*
Years	Team	Apps	(Gls)
1991–1994	Serrano-BA		
1995–1996	Conquista		
1997–1999	Rio Branco-SP	30	(7)
1997	→ Paraguaçuense (loan)		
1997–1998	→ Grasshoppers (loan)		
1998	→ Ceará (loan)	5	(6)
1999–2000	Palmeiras	24	(1)
2000–2005	Porto	53	(28)
2002–2003	→ Strasbourg (loan)	17	(1)
2003–2004	→ Braga (loan)	26	(7)
2004–2005	→ Marítimo (loan)	25	(8)
2006	Botafogo	3	(0)
2006	Paulista	3	(0)
2007	Confiança		
2008	Serrano-BA		
2009	Madre de Deus	14	(6)
2010–2011	Serrano-BA		
- * Club domestic league appearances and goals

Renivaldo Pereira de Jesus (born 19 February 1974), known as Pena, is a Brazilian former professional footballer who played as a striker.

== Career ==
Pena was born in Vitória da Conquista, Bahia. After playing with modest clubs in his country, he had his first taste of European football in 1998, but only lasted a few months with Grasshoppers, moving then to Palmeiras.

In 2000, Pena signed for Porto, where he was the top scorer in the Primeira Liga in his first season with 22 goals while also adding the Taça de Portugal. After falling out with coach Octávio Machado, he was loaned to Strasbourg in France, where he failed to settle; two other loans ensued, and the player experienced some success at both Braga and Marítimo.

Released by Porto in June 2005, Pena returned to Brazil. After a spell with Botafogo he saw out his career with lowly sides, retiring in 2011 at the age of 37.

== Personal life ==
Pena's son, Pablo, is also a footballer and a forward.

== Honours ==
Porto

- Taça de Portugal: 2000–01
- Supertaça Cândido de Oliveira: 2001

Individual

- Primeira Liga top scorer: 2000–01 (22 goals)
