= 2000–01 Boavista F.C. season =

Boavista
2000–01 season
- President: João Loureiro
- Head coach: Jaime Pacheco
- Stadium: Estádio do Bessa
- Primeira Liga: 1st (champions)
- Taça de Portugal: Semi-finals
- UEFA Cup: Second round
- Top goalscorer: League: Silva (11); All: Silva (13)

The 2000–01 season was the 98th season in the existence of Boavista F.C. and the club's 32nd consecutive season in the top flight of Portuguese football. Boavista won its first, and to date only, league championship.

In addition to the domestic league, Boavista participated in this season's editions of the Taça de Portugal and the UEFA Cup.

== Players ==
=== First-team squad ===
Note: Flags indicate national team as defined under FIFA eligibility rules; some limited exceptions apply. Players may hold more than one non-FIFA nationality.

No.	Pos.	Nation	Player
1	GK	POR	Ricardo
2	DF	POR	Rui Óscar
3	MF	POR	Rui Bento
4	DF	POR	Sérgio Carvalho
5	DF	POR	Pedro Emanuel
6	DF	BRA	Erivan
7	DF	POR	Jorge Silva
8	FW	BRA	Duda
9	FW	BRA	Demétrius
10	FW	POR	Almami Moreira
11	FW	BRA	Elpídio Silva
12	GK	CMR	William
13	MF	POR	Emanuel
14	MF	BRA	Geraldo

No.	Pos.	Nation	Player
15	DF	FRA	Quevedo
16	FW	POR	Martelinho
17	DF	POR	Litos
18	MF	POR	Pedro Santos
19	FW	BRA	Rogério
20	FW	POR	Jorge Couto
21	MF	POR	Gouveia
23	DF	POR	Frechaut
24	GK	SEN	Khadim
25	MF	POR	Petit
29	DF	BRA	Marçal
30	FW	BRA	Whelliton
37	MF	BOL	Erwin Sánchez

=== Transfers ===
==== In ====
Pos.	Name	Age	Moving from	Type	Transfer Window	Transfer fee	Sources
MF	(Portugal) Petit	23	(Portugal) Gil Vicente	Transfer	Summer	Undisclosed	
DF	(Portugal) Rui Óscar	24	(Portugal) Marítimo	Transfer	Summer	Undisclosed	
DF	(Portugal) Frechaut	22	(Portugal) Vitória de Setúbal	Transfer	Summer	350,000 (PTE)	
FW	(Brazil) Elpídio Silva	24	(Portugal) Braga	Transfer	Summer	Undisclosed	
FW	(Brazil) Duda	26	(Portugal) Alverca	Transfer	Summer	Undisclosed	
MF	(Portugal) Pedro Santos	24	(Portugal) Gil Vicente	Transfer	Summer	Undisclosed	
MF	(Portugal) Filipe Gouveia	27	(Portugal) Belenenses	Transfer	Summer	Undisclosed	
DF	(Brazil) Marçal	25	(Portugal) União de Leiria	Transfer	Summer	Undisclosed	
GK	(Senegal) Khadim	29	(Portugal) Felgueiras	Transfer	Summer	Undisclosed	
MF	(Brazil) Geraldo	27	Unattached	Transfer	Summer	Free	
GK	(Portugal) Sérgio Leite	20	(Portugal) Maia	Loan return	Summer	Free	
MF	(Portugal) Rui Lima	22	(Portugal) Chaves	Loan return	Summer	Free	
FW	(Portugal) João Paulo	20	(Portugal) Feirense	Loan return	Summer	Free	

==== Out ====
Pos.	Name	Age	Moving to	Type	Transfer Window	Transfer fee	Sources
GK	(Portugal) Daniel	18	(Portugal) Leixões	Transfer	Summer	Undisclosed	
DF	(Portugal) Paulo Sousa	33	(Portugal) União de Lamas	Transfer	Summer	Free	
DF	(Brazil) Carlos Alberto	25	(Brazil) Rio Branco-MG	Transfer	Summer	Undisclosed	
DF	(Portugal) Pedro Costa	18	(Portugal) Gondomar	Transfer	Summer	Undisclosed	
DF	(Portugal) Mário Silva	23	(France) Nantes	Transfer	Summer	Undisclosed	
MF	(Brazil) Nilton	21	(Portugal) Desportivo das Aves	Transfer	Summer	Undisclosed	
MF	(Portugal) Luís Viana	29	(Portugal) Beira-Mar	Transfer	Summer	Undisclosed	
MF	(Romania) Ion Timofte	32	None	—	Summer	Retired	
FW	(Ghana) Augustine Ahinful	25	(Turkey) Ankaragücü	Transfer	Summer	Undisclosed	
FW	(Brazil) Gilmar Estevan	33	(Portugal) Chaves	Transfer	Summer	Undisclosed	
MF	(Spain) César de Loma	24	(Spain) Betis	Transfer	Summer	Free	
FW	(Cameroon) Douala	21	(Portugal) Desportivo das Aves	Loan	Summer	Undisclosed	
DF	(Portugal) José Bosingwa	17	(Portugal) Freamunde	Loan	Summer	Free	
GK	(Portugal) Sérgio Leite	20	(Portugal) Espinho	Loan	Summer	Free	
DF	(Portugal) Flávio Cerqueira	18	(Portugal) Espinho	Loan	Summer	Free	
MF	(Portugal) Rui Lima	22	(Portugal) Desportivo das Aves	Loan	Summer	Free	
FW	(Portugal) João Paulo	20	(Portugal) Vitória de Setúbal	Loan	Summer	Free	
FW	(Brazil) Rogério	26	(Brazil) Sport Recife	Loan	Winter	Free	
MF	(Portugal) Emanuel Braga	25	(Portugal) Rio Ave	Loan	Winter	Free	

== Pre-season friendlies ==
Win Draw Loss Fixtures

28 July 2000 Torneio Cidade do Porto	Boavista (Portugal)	2–1	(Portugal) Braga	Porto, Portugal
19:00 CET (UTC+01)		Report		Stadium: Estádio do Bessa

30 July 2000 Torneio Cidade do Porto	Boavista (Portugal)	v	(Romania) Steaua București	Porto, Portugal
21:00 CET (UTC+01)

== Competitions ==
=== Overall record ===
Competition	First match	Last match	Starting round	Final position	Record							
Competition	First match	Last match	Starting round	Final position	Pld	W	D	L	GF	GA	GD	Win %
Primeira Liga	18 August 2000	27 May 2001	Matchday 1	Winners	34	23	8	3	63	22	+41	67.65
Taça de Portugal	26 November 2000	21 March 2001	Fourth round	Semi-finals	5	4	0	1	12	1	+11	80.00
UEFA Cup	10 August 2000	9 November 2000	Qualifying round	Second round	6	4	1	1	10	4	+6	66.67
Total					45	31	9	5	85	27	+58	68.89

Source: Competitions

=== Primeira Liga ===
==== League table ====
Pos	Team	Pld	W	D	L	GF	GA	GD	Pts	Qualification or relegation
1	Boavista (C)	34	23	8	3	63	22	+41	77	Qualification to Champions League first group stage
2	Porto	34	24	4	6	73	27	+46	76	Qualification to Champions League second qualifying round
3	Sporting CP	34	19	5	10	56	37	+19	62	Qualification to UEFA Cup first round
4	Braga	34	16	9	9	58	48	+10	57	
5	União de Leiria	34	15	11	8	46	41	+5	56	

Source: Primeira Divisão
Rules for classification: 1) points; 2) head-to-head points; 3) head-to-head goal difference; 4) goal difference; 5) number of goals scored
(C) Champions

==== Results summary ====
Overall								Home						Away					
Pld	W	D	L	GF	GA	GD	Pts	W	D	L	GF	GA	GD	W	D	L	GF	GA	GD
34	23	8	3	63	22	+41	77	16	0	1	39	6	+33	7	8	2	24	16	+8

==== Results by round ====
Round	1	2	3	4	5	6	7	8	9	10	11	12	13	14	15	16	17	18	19	20	21	22	23	24	25	26	27	28	29	30	31	32	33	34
Ground	A	H	A	H	H	A	H	A	H	A	H	A	H	A	H	A	H	H	A	H	A	A	H	A	H	A	H	A	H	A	H	A	H	A
Result	W	W	D	L	W	D	W	D	W	D	W	D	W	W	W	W	W	W	D	W	L	D	W	W	W	D	W	W	W	W	W	W	W	L
Position	1	1	3	6	5	7	5	5	4	5	4	4	3	2	2	2	1	1	1	1	1	1	1	1	1	1	1	1	1	1	1	1	1	1

Source: FootballPortugal
A = Away; H = Home; W = Win; D = Draw; L = Loss

==== Matches ====
18 August 2000 1	Beira-Mar	2–4	Boavista	Aveiro
WEST (UTC+1)	Dolores (yellow card) 23'; Manuel (yellow card) 37'; Silva (yellow card) 74'; Óscar 87' (o.g.); Fusco (yellow card) 90'; Sousa 90+4'		Bento (yellow card) 29'; Silva 40'; Emanuel (yellow card) 43'; Rogério 53'; Duda 55', 77'; Rogério (red card) 59'	Stadium: Estádio Mário Duarte; Attendance: 6,000; Referee: Olegário Benquerença

28 August 2000 2	Boavista	4–0	União de Leiria	Porto
WEST (UTC+1)	Jorge Silva (yellow card) 33'; Duda (yellow card) 34'; Sánchez 50'; Erivan (yellow card) 51'; Óscar 57' (yellow card) 73'; Whelliton 62'; Silva 71'; William (yellow card) 90'		Duarte (yellow card) 5'; Dinda (yellow card) 36'; Leão (red card) 44'; Derlei (yellow card) 63'	Stadium: Estádio do Bessa; Attendance: 6,000; Referee: João Ferreira

10 September 2000 3	Estrela da Amadora	0–0	Boavista	Amadora
WEST (UTC+1)	Fonseca (yellow card) 29'		Silva (yellow card) 19'	Stadium: Estádio José Gomes; Attendance: 1,000; Referee: Bruno Paixão

18 September 2000 4	Boavista	1–2	Braga	Porto
WEST (UTC+1)	Litos (yellow card) 26'; Geraldo 39' (yellow card) 48'; Emanuel (yellow card) 56'		Fehér 11', 54'; Barroso (yellow card) 42'; L. Filipe (yellow card) 44'; Rocha (yellow card) 44'; Odair (yellow card) 58'	Stadium: Estádio do Bessa; Referee: Jorge Coroado

23 September 2000 5	Boavista	1–0	Benfica	Porto
WEST (UTC+1)	Duda 2'; Litos (yellow card) 86'; Emanuel (yellow card) 81'		van Hooijdonk (yellow card) 71'; Maniche (red card) 88'	Stadium: Estádio do Bessa; Referee: José Pratas

2 October 2000 6	Belenenses	2–2	Boavista	Lisbon
WEST (UTC+1)	Marcão 39'; Lima (yellow card) 65'; Verona 57' (yellow card) 81'		Whelliton (yellow card) 15'; Sánchez 26'; William (yellow card) 37'; Erivan 41' (yellow card) 76'	Stadium: Estádio do Restelo; Referee: Olegário Benquerença

13 October 2000 7	Boavista	1–0	Paços de Ferreira	Porto
WEST (UTC+1)	Rogério 48'			Stadium: Estádio do Bessa; Referee: Paulo Paraty

20 October 2000 8	Campomaiorense	0–0	Boavista	Campo Maior
WEST (UTC+1)				Stadium: Estádio Capitão Cesar Correia; Attendance: 1500; Referee: Jorge Coroado

30 October 2000 9	Boavista	3–1	Marítimo	Porto
	Duda 16'; Sánchez 64'; Silva 86'		Mariano 9'	Stadium: Estádio do Bessa; Referee: António Costa

4 November 2000 10	Farense	2–2	Boavista	Faro
WET (UTC±0)	Nader 20'; Đurđević 22'		Santos 9'; Couto 73'	Stadium: Estádio de São Luís; Referee: Martins dos Santos

14 November 2000 11	Boavista	4–1	Vitória de Guimarães	Porto
WET (UTC±0)	Silva 8'; Santos 25'; Couto 30'; J. Silva 80'		Evando 90'	Stadium: Estádio do Bessa; Referee: Isidoro Rodrigues

19 November 2000 12	Sporting CP	0–0	Boavista	Lisbon
WET (UTC±0)				Stadium: Estádio José Alvalade; Referee: Lucílio Baptista

3 December 2000 13	Boavista	5–1	Alverca	Porto
WET (UTC±0)	Litos 4'; Whelliton 17'; Duda 21', 32'; Petit 79' (pen.)		Anderson 88'	Stadium: Estádio do Bessa; Referee: Paulo Costa

8 December 2000 14	Gil Vicente	0–2	Boavista	Barcelos
WET (UTC±0)			Whelliton 13'; Frechaut 89'	Stadium: Estádio Adelino Ribeiro Novo; Referee: Martins dos Santos

17 December 2000 15	Boavista	5–0	Salgueiros	Porto
WET (UTC±0)	Litos 15'; Whelliton 20', 57'; Petit 49' (pen.); Martelinho 73'			Stadium: Estádio do Bessa; Referee: António Costa

7 January 2001 16	Aves	1–2	Boavista	Vila das Aves
WET (UTC±0)	Abílio 4'		Sánchez 30'; Petit 48' (pen.)	Stadium: Estádio do CD Aves; Referee: Duarte Gomes

13 January 2001 17	Boavista	1–0	Porto	Porto
WET (UTC±0)	Martelinho 31'			Stadium: Estádio do Bessa; Referee: Vítor Melo Pereira

20 January 2001 18	Boavista	1–0	Beira-Mar	Porto
WET (UTC±0)	Sánchez 63'			Stadium: Estádio do Bessa; Referee: Bruno Paixão

28 January 2001 19	União de Leiria	0–0	Boavista	Leiria
WET (UTC±0)				Stadium: Estádio Dr. Magalhães Pessoa; Referee: António Costa

2 February 2001 20	Boavista	1–0	Estrela da Amadora	Porto
WET (UTC±0)	Quevedo 21'			Stadium: Estádio do Bessa; Referee: Isidoro Rodrigues

17 February 2001 21	Braga	1–0	Boavista	Braga
WET (UTC±0)	Riva 82'			Stadium: Estádio 1º de Maio; Referee: João Ferreira

25 February 2001 22	Benfica	0–0	Boavista	Lisbon
WET (UTC±0)	Roger (yellow card) 21'; Meira (yellow card) 42'		Santos (yellow card) 26'; Sánchez (yellow card) 31'	Stadium: Estádio da Luz; Referee: José Pratas

2 March 2001 23	Boavista	2–0	Belenenses	Porto
WET (UTC±0)	Litos 4'; Whelliton 65'; Petit (yellow card) 72'		Gerson (yellow card) 36'; Filgueira (yellow card) 39'; Guga (yellow card) 55'; Vidigal (yellow card) 75'	Stadium: Estádio do Bessa; Referee: Francisco Ferreira

9 March 2001 24	Paços de Ferreira	0–2	Boavista	Paços de Ferreira
WET (UTC±0)	Zé Manel (yellow card) 6'; Dias (yellow card) 35'		Duda 16' 52'; Erivan 17'; Martelinho 18' (yellow card) 76'; Petit (yellow card) 33'; Santos (yellow card) 88'	Stadium: Estádio da Mata Real; Referee: Bruno Paixão

16 March 2001 25	Boavista	3–1	Campomaiorense	Porto
WET (UTC±0)	Litos 11' (yellow card) 44'; Sánchez 55' (pen.), 66' (pen.); Duda (yellow card) 61'; Demétrius (yellow card) 80'; Gouveia (yellow card) 87'		Beke (yellow card) 16'; Almeida (yellow card) 26'; Vaz (yellow card) 34'; Patacas (yellow card) 55'; Laélson 61' (pen.); Pacheco (yellow card) 89'	Stadium: Estádio do Bessa; Referee: Isidoro Rodrigues

31 March 2001 26	Marítimo	1–1	Boavista	Funchal
WEST (UTC+1)	Șumudică (yellow card) 22'; Bakero 80'; C. Jorge (yellow card) 89'		Quevedo (yellow card) 12'; Sánchez 45' (yellow card) 86'; Bento (yellow card) 47'; Whelliton (yellow card) 63'; Santos (yellow card) 71'; Petit (yellow card) 73'	Stadium: Estádio do Marítimo; Referee: Martins dos Santos

8 April 2001 27	Boavista	1–0	Farense	Porto
WEST (UTC+1)	Silva 80'; Martelinho (yellow card) 90'		Porto 27'; Fernandes (yellow card) 90'	Stadium: Estádio do Bessa; Referee: José Pratas

16 April 2001 28	Vitória de Guimarães	1–2	Boavista	Guimarães
WEST (UTC+1)	William (yellow card) 18'; Paulão (yellow card) 44' (goal) 90'		Silva 10'; Emanuel (yellow card) 44'; Duda 60'	Stadium: Estádio D. Afonso Henriques; Referee: Bruno Paixão

21 April 2001 29	Boavista	1–0	Sporting CP	Porto
WEST (UTC+1)	Silva (yellow card) 35'; Martelinho (yellow card) 45' (goal) 89'		Rui Jorge (yellow card) 19'; Barbosa (yellow card) 75'; Hugo (yellow card) 90'; Bento (yellow card) 90'	Stadium: Estádio do Bessa; Referee: José Leirós

28 April 2001 30	Alverca	1–2	Boavista	Alverca do Ribatejo
WEST (UTC+1)	Zé António (yellow card) 29'; Mantorras 69'; Paviot (yellow card) 82'; Macanga (yellow card) 80'; Matos (yellow card) 89'		Martelinho (yellow card) 11'; Duda 20'; Petit (penalty missed) 30' (yellow card) 86'; Silva 41'; Litos (yellow card) 63'; Frechaut (yellow card) 84'; Bento (yellow card) 86'; Whelliton (yellow card) 88'	Stadium: Complexo do Alverca; Referee: Isidoro Rodrigues

5 May 2001 31	Boavista	2–0	Gil Vicente	Porto
WEST (UTC+1)	Emanuel (yellow card) 8'; Jorge Couto 18'; Frechaut 90'		Lomba (yellow card) 4'; Lemos (yellow card) 22' (yellow-red card) 54'; Afonso (yellow card) 57'; Bessa (yellow card) 69'; Martins (yellow card) 88'; Casquilha (red card) 88'	Stadium: Estádio do Bessa; Referee: João Ferreira

13 May 2001 32	Salgueiros	1–5	Boavista	Porto
WEST (UTC+1)	Litera (yellow card) 20'; Bodunha (yellow card) 28'; Frechaut 52' (o.g.)		Jorge Couto 21'; Bento (yellow card) 36'; Silva 30', 59', 83' (pen.); Duda 41'	Stadium: Estádio Engenheiro Vidal Pinheiro; Referee: Vítor Melo Pereira

18 May 2001 33	Boavista	3–0	Aves	Porto
WEST (UTC+1)	Soares 22' (o.g.); Silva 49'; Emanuel (yellow card) 61'; Whelliton 64'		Duarte (yellow card) 20'; Afonso (yellow card) 43'; Soares (yellow card) 44'; Carvalho (yellow card) 48'	Stadium: Estádio do Bessa; Referee: Duarte Gomes

27 May 2001 34	Porto	4–0	Boavista	Porto
WEST (UTC+1)	Deco 10', 16', 44'; Silva 41'; Secretário (yellow card) 68'; Capucho (yellow card) 74'		Petit (yellow card) 11' (red card) 11'; Martelinho (yellow card) 68'; Gouveia (yellow card) 74'	Stadium: Estádio das Antas; Referee: Jacinto Paixão

=== Taça de Portugal ===
26 November 2000 Fourth round	Boavista	6–1	Freamunde	Porto
21:00 WET (UTC±0)	Martelinho 20', 68'; Jorge Couto 60'; Whelliton 76'; Demétrius 77', 86'		Nélson (yellow card) 60'; Pascal 65'; Eboué (red card) 88'	Stadium: Estádio do Bessa; Referee: José Pratas

20 December 2000 Fifth round	Boavista	3–0	Desportivo das Aves	Porto
21:00 WET (UTC±0)	Petit (yellow card) 1'; Whelliton 12'; Litos (yellow card) 44'; Quevedo (yellow card) 41'; Martelinho 58', 68'		Afonso (yellow card) 6'; J. Silva (yellow card) 8'; L. Silva (yellow card) 21'; Quinzinho (yellow card) 43'	Stadium: Estádio do Bessa; Referee: Vítor Pereira

17 January 2001 Sixth round	Penafiel	0–1	Boavista	Penafiel
21:00 WET (UTC±0)	Nevada (yellow card) 67'; Fernandes (yellow card) 79'		Ferraz 21' (o.g.); Sánchez (yellow card) 28'; Demétrius (yellow card) 33'	Stadium: Estádio Municipal 25 de Abril; Referee: José Pratas

11 February 2001 Quarter-finals	Moreirense	1–2	Boavista	Moreira de Cónegos
15:00 WET (UTC±0)	Armando Silva 63'; Meireles (yellow card) 88'	[[[Category:All articles with unsourced statements]]	Martelinho 20'; Quevedo (yellow card) 41'; Óscar (yellow card) 50'; Pedro Santos 32' (yellow card) 89'	Stadium: Parque de Jogos Comendador Joaquim de Almeida Freitas; Attendance: 4,000; Referee: Emanuel Câmara

21 March 2001 Semi-finals	Boavista	0–1	Marítimo	Porto
18:30 WEST (UTC+1)	Petit (yellow card) 31'; Demétrius (yellow card) 89'	[[[Category:All articles with unsourced statements]]	Iliev (yellow card) 24'; Paulo Sérgio 32'; Santos (yellow card) 30' (yellow-red card) 76'; Gilmar (yellow card) 81'; Jorge (yellow card) 87'	Stadium: Estádio do Bessa; Referee: João Ferreira

=== UEFA Cup ===
==== Qualifying round ====
10 August 2000 First leg	Boavista (Portugal)	2–0	(Wales) Barry Town	Porto, Portugal
	Silva 22'; Rogério 40'	[[[Category:All articles with unsourced statements]]	Ince (yellow card) 7'; Lloyd (yellow card) 85'	Stadium: Estádio do Bessa; Attendance: 5,000; Referee: Jack van Hulten (Netherlands)

24 August 2000 Second leg	Barry Town (Wales)	0–3 (0–5 agg.)	(Portugal) Boavista	Barry, Wales
	Staton (yellow card) 90'	[[[Category:All articles with unsourced statements]]	Rogério 14'; Pedro Emanuel (yellow card) 43'; Silva 54'; Sánchez 60'	Stadium: Jenner Park Stadium; Attendance: 1,370; Referee: Lawrence Sammut (Malta)

==== First round ====
14 September 2000 First leg	Vorskla Poltava (Ukraine)	1–2	(Portugal) Boavista	Poltava, Ukraine
19:00	Melaschenko 38'; Makouski (yellow card) 61'	[[[Category:All articles with unsourced statements]]	Óscar (yellow card) 33'; Couto 50'; Whelliton 89'	Stadium: Vorskla Stadium; Attendance: 7,300; Referee: Eric Blareau (Belgium)

28 September 2000 Second leg	Boavista (Portugal)	2–1 (4–2 agg.)	(Ukraine) Vorskla Poltava	Porto, Portugal
21:00	Sánchez 28'; Rogério 37' (pen.); Demétrius (yellow card) 55'	[[[Category:All articles with unsourced statements]]	Pershyn (red card) 26'; Onopko 50'	Stadium: Estádio do Bessa; Attendance: 1,500; Referee: Dieter Schoch (Switzerland)

==== Second round ====
26 October 2000 First leg	Boavista (Portugal)	0–1	(Italy) Roma	Porto, Portugal
22:30	Rogério (red card) 43'; Duda (yellow card) 68'	[[[Category:All articles with unsourced statements]]	Guigou (yellow card) 13'; Zago (yellow card) 65'; Montella 74'; Rinaldi (yellow card) 80'	Stadium: Estádio do Bessa; Attendance: 6,000; Referee: Frank De Bleeckere (Belgium)

9 November 2000 Second leg	Roma (Italy)	1–1 (2–1 agg.)	(Portugal) Boavista	Rome, Italy
18:15	Nakata 9'; Tommasi (yellow card) 43'; Batistuta (yellow card) 56'; Mangone (yellow card) 75'	[[[Category:All articles with unsourced statements]]	Duda 54'; Santos (yellow card) 57'; Couto (yellow card) 88'; Martelinho (yellow card) 90'	Stadium: Stadio Olimpico; Attendance: 10,831; Referee: Éric Poulat (France)

== Statistics ==
=== Goalscorers ===
Includes all competitive matches. The list is sorted alphabetically by surname when total goals are equal.

No.	Pos	Nat	Name	Primeira Liga	Taça de Portugal	UEFA Cup	Total
11	FW	(Brazil)	Silva	11	0	2	13
8	MF	(Brazil)	Duda	10	0	1	11
37	MF	(Bolivia)	Erwin Sánchez	8	0	2	10
30	FW	(Brazil)	Whelliton	7	2	1	10
16	FW	(Portugal)	Martelinho	4	5	0	9
20	FW	(Portugal)	Jorge Couto	3	1	1	5
17	DF	(Portugal)	Litos	5	0	0	5
19	FW	(Brazil)	Rogério	2	0	3	5
25	MF	(Portugal)	Petit	3	0	0	3
18	MF	(Portugal)	Pedro Santos	2	1	0	3
23	DF	(Portugal)	Frechaut	2	0	0	2
30	FW	(Brazil)	Whelliton	0	2	0	2
6	DF	(Brazil)	Erivan	1	0	0	1
14	MF	(Brazil)	Geraldo	1	0	0	1
2	DF	(Portugal)	Rui Óscar	1	0	0	1
15	DF	(France)	Quevedo	1	0	0	1
7	DF	(Portugal)	Jorge Silva	1	0	0	1
Own goals				1	1	0	2
Totals				63	12	10	85

=== Hat-tricks ===
Player	Against	Result	Date	Competition	Ref
(Brazil) Elpídio Silva	Salgueiros	1–5 (A)	13 May 2001	Primeira Liga	

(H) – Home; (A) – Away

=== Clean sheets ===
The list is sorted by shirt number when total clean sheets are equal. Numbers in parentheses represent games where both goalkeepers participated and both kept a clean sheet; the number in parentheses is awarded to the goalkeeper who was substituted on, whilst a full clean sheet is awarded to the goalkeeper who was on the field at the start of play.

			Clean sheets			
No.	Player	Games Played	Primeira Liga	Taça da Portugal	UEFA Cup	TOTAL
1	(Portugal) Ricardo	31	16	0	0	16
12	(Cameroon) William	14 (1) (Note: Ricardo was sent off against Campomaiorense on matchday 8 and William kept the Clean sheet)	3	2	2	7
24	(Senegal) Khadim	0	0	0	0	0
Totals			19	2	2	23

== Awards ==
=== CNID Footballer of the Year ===
Season	Player	Ref.
2000–01	(Portugal) Petit	

=== Record Player of the Year ===
Season	Player	Ref.
2000–01	(Portugal) Petit	

=== Portuguese Golden Ball ===
Season	Player	Ref.
2000–01	(Bolivia) Erwin Sánchez	
