= 2001–02 Boavista F.C. season =

Boavista
2001–02 season
- President: João Loureiro
- Head coach: Jaime Pacheco
- Stadium: Estádio do Bessa
- Primeira Liga: 2nd
- Taça de Portugal: Fifth round
- UEFA Champions League: Second group stage
- Supertaça Cândido de Oliveira: Runners-up
- Top goalscorer: League: Elpídio Silva (8); All: Elpídio Silva (12)
Home colours	Away colours

The 2001–02 season was Boavista Futebol Clube's 88th competitive season, 33rd consecutive season in the top flight of Portuguese football, and 98th year in existence as a football club.

Boavista went into the 2001–02 season as the defending champions of the Primeira Liga, after claiming their first league title in the 2000–01 season. As winners of the 2000–01 Primeira Liga, Os Axadrezados qualified for the 2001 Supertaça Cândido de Oliveira and the 2001–02 UEFA Champions League group stage.

The 2001–02 season started with a defeat for the Porto side. As Panteras lost to Porto at the Estádio do Rio Ave FC in the Supertaça Cândido de Oliveira after a first half headed goal from central defender Jorge Andrade. In domestic league action, the Porto-based side were unable to regain the league title for a second consecutive season after finishing second, five points behind Sporting CP. In the Taça de Portugal, As Panteras' campaign proved to be a disappointing one after being eliminated in the fifth round by Alverca.

In Boavista's European campaign, the side progressed through the first UEFA Champions League group stage round after finishing second with eight points behind English side Liverpool in a group which also contained German side Borussia Dortmund and Ukrainian champions Dynamo Kyiv. Os Axadrezados were eliminated in the next group stage round after finishing third in a group which contained Manchester United, Bayern Munich and Nantes.

== Squads ==
=== First team squad ===
Stats as of the end of the 2001–02 season. Games played and goals scored only refers to appearances and goals in the Primeira Liga.

No.	Name	Nationality	Position(s)	Since	Date of Birth (Age)	Signed from	Games	Goals
Goalkeepers
1	Ricardo	(Portugal)	GK	1995	11 February 1976 (aged 26)	(Portugal) Montijo	121	0
12	William Andem	(Cameroon)	GK	1997	14 June 1968 (aged 33)	(Brazil) Bahia	70	0
24	Khadim Faye	(Senegal)	GK	2000	5 September 1970 (aged 31)	(Portugal) Felgueiras	1	0
Defenders
2	Rui Óscar	(Portugal)	RB	2000	17 December 1975 (aged 26)	(Portugal) Marítimo	37	1
3	Fernando Ávalos	(Argentina)	CB / DM	2002	31 March 1978 (aged 24)	(Switzerland) Basel	8	0
4	Paulo Turra	(Brazil)	CB	2001	14 November 1973 (aged 28)	(Brazil) Palmeiras	31	0
5	Pedro Emanuel (C)	(Portugal)	CB	1996	11 February 1975 (aged 27)	(Portugal) Penafiel	149	1
6	Erivan	(Brazil)	LB	2000	21 May 1975 (aged 26)	(Portugal) Freamunde	51	1
7	Jorge Silva	(Portugal)	CB / DM	1994	4 December 1975 (aged 26)	(Portugal) Youth system	80	1
15	William Quevedo	(France)	LB	1997	8 May 1971 (aged 30)	(Portugal) Moreirense	69	4
17	José Bosingwa	(Portugal)	RB	2000	24 August 1982 (aged 19)	(Portugal) Youth system	15	0
19	Mário Loja	(Portugal)	LB	2001	27 December 1977 (aged 24)	(Portugal) Vitória de Setúbal	22	0
23	Nuno Frechaut	(Portugal)	CB / CM / RB	2000	24 September 1977 (aged 24)	(Portugal) Vitória de Setúbal	46	4
Midfielders
	Braíma Injai	(Guinea-Bissau)	CB / CM / DM	2001	6 October 1975 (aged 26)	(Portugal) Desportivo das Aves	0	0
13	Luís Pedrosa	(Portugal)	DM	2001	13 March 1972 (aged 30)	(Portugal) Salgueiros	12	0
14	Geraldo Oliveira	(Brazil)	CM	2000	15 July 1972 (aged 29)	(Brazil) Bragantino	9	1
18	Pedro Santos	(Portugal)	CM	2000	28 June 1976 (aged 25)	(Portugal) Gil Vicente	32	2
21	Filipe Gouveia	(Portugal)	AM	2000	12 May 1973 (aged 28)	(France) Montpellier	13	1
25	Petit	(Portugal)	CM / DM	2000	25 September 1976 (aged 25)	(Portugal) Gil Vicente	51	7
30	Alexandre Goulart	(Brazil)	AM	2001	24 July 1976 (aged 25)	(Brazil) Betim	23	7
37	Erwin Sánchez	(Bolivia)	AM	2000	19 October 1969 (aged 32)	(Portugal) Benfica	209	33
55	Glauber Farias	(Brazil)	CM	2001	9 February 1975 (aged 27)	(Portugal) Paços de Ferreira	5	0
Forwards
8	Duda	(Brazil)	RW	2000	15 March 1974 (aged 28)	(Portugal) Alverca	59	13
9	Serginho Baiano	(Brazil)	LW	2001	5 January 1978 (aged 24)	(Brazil) Corinthians Alagoano	22	7
10	Márcio Mixirica	(Brazil)	CF	2001	23 January 1975 (aged 27)	(Turkey) Galatasaray	17	5
11	Elpídio Silva	(Brazil)	CF	2000	19 July 1975 (aged 26)	(Portugal) Braga	49	19
16	Martelinho	(Portugal)	RW	1996	19 November 1974 (aged 27)	(Portugal) Desportivo das Aves	111	16
20	Jorge Couto	(Portugal)	RW	1996	1 July 1970 (aged 31)	(Portugal) Porto	157	15
22	João Paulo	(Portugal)	CF	1999	8 April 1980 (aged 22)	(Portugal) Youth system	5	0
27	Rui Lima	(Portugal)	AM / LM / LW	2001	25 March 1978 (aged 24)	(Portugal) Desportivo das Aves	13	1

== Competitions ==
=== Legend ===
Win Draw Loss

=== Overall ===
Competition	Started round	Final position / round	First match	Last match
Supertaça Cândido de Oliveira	Final	Runners-up	4 August 2001	
Primeira Liga		2nd	10 August 2001	5 May 2002
Taça de Portugal	4th round	5th round	17 November 2001	12 December 2001
UEFA Champions League	Group stage	Second group stage	11 September 2001	19 March 2002

=== Competition record ===
Competition	Record							
Competition	G	W	D	L	GF	GA	GD	Win %
Primeira Liga	34	21	7	6	53	20	+33	61.76
Taça de Portugal	2	1	0	1	3	1	+2	50.00
Supertaça Cândido de Oliveira	1	0	0	1	0	1	−1	0.00
UEFA Champions League	12	3	4	5	10	15	−5	25.00
Total	49	25	11	13	66	37	+29	51.02

=== Supertaça Cândido de Oliveira ===
4 August 2001 Final	Boavista	0–1	Porto	Vila do Conde
21:00 WEST			Andrade 22'	Stadium: Estádio do Rio Ave FC; Referee: Martins dos Santos (Porto)

=== Primeira Liga ===
==== League table ====
Pos	Team	Pld	W	D	L	GF	GA	GD	Pts	Qualification or relegation
1	Sporting CP (C)	34	22	9	3	74	25	+49	75	Qualification to Champions League third qualifying round
2	Boavista	34	21	7	6	53	20	+33	70	Qualification to Champions League second qualifying round
3	Porto	34	21	5	8	66	34	+32	68	Qualification to UEFA Cup first round
4	Benfica	34	17	12	5	66	37	+29	63	
5	Belenenses	34	17	6	11	54	44	+10	57	Qualification to Intertoto Cup second round

Source: Primeira Divisão
Rules for classification: 1) points; 2) head-to-head points; 3) head-to-head goal difference; 4) goal difference; 5) number of goals scored
(C) Champions

==== Results summary ====
Overall								Home						Away					
Pld	W	D	L	GF	GA	GD	Pts	W	D	L	GF	GA	GD	W	D	L	GF	GA	GD
34	21	7	6	53	20	+33	70	11	4	2	29	6	+23	10	3	4	24	14	+10

==== Results by round ====
Round	1	2	3	4	5	6	7	8	9	10	11	12	13	14	15	16	17	18	19	20	21	22	23	24	25	26	27	28	29	30	31	32	33	34
Ground	H	A	H	A	H	A	H	A	H	A	H	A	A	H	A	H	A	A	H	A	H	A	H	A	H	A	H	A	H	H	A	H	A	H
Result	W	L	W	W	W	W	D	L	W	W	W	L	D	L	W	W	D	W	W	W	W	W	D	W	D	W	W	W	D	W	D	L	L	W
Position	1	9	6	3	1	1	1	2	1	1	1	2	4	4	3	2	2	2	2	2	2	1	2	2	2	2	2	2	2	2	2	2	2	2

Source: FootballPortugal
A = Away; H = Home; W = Win; D = Draw; L = Loss

==== Matches ====
10 August 2001 1	Boavista	3–0	Beira-Mar	Porto
WEST	Baiano 44', 69'; Duda 83'			Stadium: Estádio do Bessa; Referee: Paulo Costa

19 August 2001 2	Porto	4–1	Boavista	Porto
WEST	Clayton 22'; J. Costa 79'; Andrade 87'; Postiga 88'		Petit 67'	Stadium: Estádio das Antas; Referee: Jacinto Paixão

26 August 2001 3	Boavista	2–0	Belenenses	Porto
WEST	E. Silva 58'; Duda 89'			Stadium: Estádio do Bessa; Referee: Paulo Baptista

7 September 2001 4	Alverca	1–2	Boavista	Alverca do Ribatejo
WEST	Cajú 77'		Goulart 34', 53'	Stadium: Complexo Desportivo do FC Alverca; Referee: Paulo Costa

15 September 2001 5	Boavista	1–0	União de Leiria	Porto
WEST	Frechaut 62'			Stadium: Estádio do Bessa; Referee: Paulo Paraty

22 September 2001 6	Gil Vicente	0–3	Boavista	Barcelos
WEST			Mixirica 13', 18', 37'	Stadium: Estádio Adelino Ribeiro Novo; Referee: Luís Miranda

30 September 2001 7	Boavista	1–1	Farense	Porto
WEST	Frechaut 63'		J. Ferreira 58'	Stadium: Estádio do Bessa; Referee: Bruno Paixão

7 October 2001 10	Santa Clara	0–2	Boavista	Ponta Delgada
WEST			Gouveia 44'; Sánchez 54'	Stadium: Estádio de São Miguel; Referee: Martins dos Santos

12 October 2001 8	Vitória de Guimarães	2–0	Boavista	Guimarães
WEST	Ceará 32'; Romeu 37'			Stadium: Estádio D. Afonso Henriques; Referee: Pedro Proença

20 October 2001 9	Boavista	3–0	Braga	Porto
WEST	Goulart 14'; E. Silva 66' (pen.); Martelinho 70'			Stadium: Estádio do Bessa; Referee: Vítor Pereira

6 November 2001 11	Boavista	5–0	Paços de Ferreira	Porto
WET	E. Silva 29'; Pedro 60' (o.g.); Baiano 71'; Petit 78'; Mixirica 87'			Stadium: Estádio do Bessa; Referee: Luís Miranda

26 November 2001 12	Sporting CP	0–2	Boavista	Lisbon
WET	João Pinto 22'; Jardel 64' (pen.)			Stadium: Estádio José Alvalade; Referee: Isidoro Rodrigues

1 December 2001 13	Salgueiros	1–1	Boavista	Porto
WET	Toy 82'		Sánchez 14' (pen.)	Stadium: Estádio Engenheiro Vidal Pinheiro; Referee: Paulo Paraty

9 December 2001 14	Boavista	0–1	Marítimo	Porto
WET			Neles 32'	Stadium: Estádio do Bessa; Referee: Bruno Paixão

15 December 2001 15	Varzim	0–2	Boavista	Póvoa de Varzim
WET			E. Silva 15'; Martelinho 77'	Stadium: Estádio do Varzim Sport Club; Referee: Carlos Xistra

23 December 2001 16	Boavista	1–0	Benfica	Porto
WET	E. Silva 6'			Stadium: Estádio do Bessa; Referee: Pedro Proença

7 January 2002 17	Vitória de Setúbal	1–1	Boavista	Setúbal
WET	H. Sousa 46'		Sánchez 78'	Stadium: Estádio do Bonfim; Referee: Paulo Paraty

14 January 2002 18	Beira-Mar	0–3	Boavista	Aveiro
WET			E. Silva 50' (pen.); Goulart 77'; Baiano 85'	Stadium: Estádio Mário Duarte; Referee: Carlos Xistra

20 January 2002 19	Boavista	2–0	Porto	Porto
WET	Petit 44'; Martelinho 90'			Stadium: Estádio do Bessa; Referee: Paulo Costa

27 January 2002 20	Belenenses	0–2	Boavista	Lisbon
WET	E. Silva 1'; Goulart 87'			Stadium: Estádio do Restelo; Referee: Lucílio Batista

1 February 2002 21	Boavista	2–0	Alverca	Porto
WET	E. Silva 65'; Sánchez 89'			Stadium: Estádio do Bessa; Referee: Jacinto Paixão

9 February 2002 22	União de Leiria	0–1	Boavista	Marinha Grande
WET			Martelinho 88'	Stadium: Estádio Municipal da Marinha Grande; Referee: Pedro Proença

16 February 2002 23	Boavista	0–0	Gil Vicente	Porto
19:25 WET				Stadium: Estádio do Bessa; Referee: Vítor Pereira

23 February 2002 24	Farense	1–2	Boavista	Faro
17:00 WET	Costa 43' (pen.)		Sánchez 71' (pen.); Lima 76'	Stadium: Estádio de São Luís; Referee: Duarte Gomes

3 March 2002 25	Boavista	0–0	Vitória de Guimarães	Porto
18:30 WET				Stadium: Estádio do Bessa; Referee: Lucílio Batista

9 March 2002 26	Braga	0–2	Boavista	Braga
19:00 WET			Duda 26'; Artur Jorge 70' (o.g.)	Stadium: Estádio Primeiro de Maio; Referee: João Vilas Boas

16 March 2002 27	Boavista	2–0	Santa Clara	Porto
18:00 WET	Baiano 9'; Goulart 89'			Stadium: Estádio do Bessa; Referee: Olegário Benquerença

24 March 2002 28	Paços de Ferreira	0–1	Boavista	Paços de Ferreira
21:00 WET			Mixirica 15'	Stadium: Estádio da Mata Real; Referee: Paulo Baptista

30 March 2002 29	Boavista	0–0	Sporting CP	Porto
21:00 WET				Stadium: Estádio do Bessa; Referee: José Pratas

5 April 2002 30	Boavista	2–1	Salgueiros	Porto
21:00 WEST	Baiano 7'; Martelinho 67'		Loja 56' (o.g.)	Stadium: Estádio do Bessa; Referee: Vítor Pereira

12 April 2002 31	Marítimo	0–0	Boavista	Funchal
21:00 WEST				Stadium: Estádio dos Barreiros; Referee: Martins dos Santos

20 April 2002 32	Boavista	1–2	Varzim	Porto
18:00 WEST	Baiano 13'		Vinícius 4', 23' (pen.)	Stadium: Estádio do Bessa; Referee: José Pratas

28 April 2002 33	Benfica	2–1	Boavista	Lisbon
19:30 WEST	Argel 54'; Mantorras 81'		Sánchez 40'	Stadium: Estádio da Luz; Referee: Paulo Baptista

5 May 2002 34	Boavista	4–1	Vitória de Setúbal	Porto
16:00 WEST	Petit 25'; Frechaut 41'; Goulart 78'; Martelinho 82'		Henrique 38'	Stadium: Estádio do Bessa; Referee: António Costa

=== Taça de Portugal ===
17 November 2001 Fourth round	Boavista	3–0 (a.e.t.)	União de Leiria	Porto
WET	Goulart 113', 119'; Petit 97'			Stadium: Estádio do Bessa; Referee: Lucílio Batista

12 December 2001 Fifth round	Boavista	0–1	Alverca	Porto
WET			Tinaia 90+1'	Stadium: Estádio do Bessa; Referee: Paulo Baptista

=== UEFA Champions League ===
==== First group stage ====
Pos	Team	Pld	W	D	L	GF	GA	GD	Pts	Qualification
1	(England) Liverpool	6	3	3	0	7	3	+4	12	Advance to second group stage
2	(Portugal) Boavista	6	2	2	2	8	7	+1	8	Advance to second group stage
3	(Germany) Borussia Dortmund	6	2	2	2	6	7	−1	8	Transfer to UEFA Cup
4	(Ukraine) Dynamo Kyiv	6	1	1	4	5	9	−4	4	

Source: RSSSF

11 September 2001 1	Liverpool (England)	1–1	(Portugal) Boavista	Liverpool, England
20:45	Owen 29'	Report	Silva 3'	Stadium: Anfield; Attendance: 30,015; Referee: Kyros Vassaras (Greece)

19 September 2001 2	Boavista (Portugal)	3–1	(Ukraine) Dynamo Kyiv	Porto, Portugal
20:45	Sánchez 4'; Silva 11'; Duda 30'	Report	Ghioane 5'	Stadium: Estádio do Bessa; Attendance: 6,800; Referee: Alfredo Trentalange (Italy)

26 September 2001 3	Boavista (Portugal)	2–1	(Germany) Borussia Dortmund	Porto, Portugal
20:45	Silva 23'; Sánchez 39'	Report	Amoroso 76'	Stadium: Estádio do Bessa; Attendance: 7,600; Referee: Rune Pedersen (Norway)

16 October 2001 4	Borussia Dortmund (Germany)	2–1	(Portugal) Boavista	Dortmund, Germany
20:45	Ricken 50'; Koller 68'	Report	Alex Goulart 33'	Stadium: Westfalenstadion; Attendance: 41,247; Referee: Stefano Braschi (Italy)

24 October 2001 5	Boavista (Portugal)	1–1	(England) Liverpool	Porto, Portugal
20:45	Silva 60'	Report	Murphy 17'	Stadium: Estádio do Bessa; Attendance: 9,460; Referee: Karl-Erik Nilsson (Sweden)

30 October 2001 6	Dynamo Kyiv (Ukraine)	1–0	(Portugal) Boavista	Kyiv, Ukraine
20:45	Melaschenko 49'	Report		Stadium: NSC Olympiyskiy Stadium; Attendance: 18,000; Referee: Fritz Stuchlik (Austria)

==== Second group stage ====
Pos	Team	Pld	W	D	L	GF	GA	GD	Pts	Qualification	MUN	BAY	BOA	NAN
1	(England) Manchester United	6	3	3	0	13	3	+10	12	Advance to knockout stage	—	0–0	3–0	5–1
2	(Germany) Bayern Munich	6	3	3	0	5	2	+3	12	Advance to knockout stage	1–1	—	1–0	2–1
3	(Portugal) Boavista	6	1	2	3	2	8	−6	5		0–3	0–0	—	1–0
4	(France) Nantes	6	0	2	4	4	11	−7	2		1–1	0–1	1–1	—

Source: RSSSF

20 November 2001 1	Boavista (Portugal)	1–0	(France) Nantes	Porto, Portugal
20:45	Sánchez 24'	Report		Stadium: Estádio do Bessa; Referee: Jan Wegereef (Belgium)

5 December 2001 2	Manchester United (England)	3–0	(Portugal) Boavista	Manchester, England
20:45	van Nistelrooy 31', 62'; Blanc 55'	Report		Stadium: Old Trafford; Referee: Antonio Jesús López Nieto (Spain)

20 February 2002 3	Boavista (Portugal)	0–0	(Germany) Bayern Munich	Porto, Portugal
20:45		Report		Stadium: Estádio do Bessa; Referee: Ľuboš Micheľ (Slovakia)

26 February 2002 4	Bayern Munich (Germany)	1–0	(Portugal) Boavista	Munich, Germany
20:45	Santa Cruz 81'	Report		Stadium: Olympiastadion; Referee: Terje Hauge (Norway)

13 March 2002 5	Nantes (France)	1–1	(Portugal) Boavista	Nantes, France
20:45	Moldovan 43'	Report	Martelinho 78'	Stadium: Stade de la Beaujoire; Referee: Hugh Dallas (Scotland)

19 March 2002 6	Boavista (Portugal)	0–3	(England) Manchester United	Porto, Portugal
20:45		Report	Blanc 14'; Solskjær 29'; Beckham 51' (pen.)	Stadium: Estádio do Bessa; Referee: Konrad Plautz (Austria)

== Player information ==
=== Appearances and goals ===
As of the end of the 2001–02 season.

No.	Pos	Nat	Player	Total		Primeira Liga		Taça de Portugal		Supertaça		Europe	
No.	Pos	Nat	Player	Apps	Goals	Apps	Goals	Apps	Goals	Apps	Goals	Apps	Goals
Goalkeepers
1	GK	(Portugal) POR	Ricardo	42	0	29	0	0	0	1	0	12	0
12	GK	(Cameroon) CMR	William Andem	9	0	7	0	2	0	0	0	0	0
24	GK	(Senegal) SEN	Khadim Faye	1	0	1	0	0	0	0	0	0	0
Defenders
2	DF	(Portugal) POR	Rui Óscar	20	0	14	0	1	0	1	0	4	0
3	DF	(Argentina) ARG	Fernando Ávalos	10	0	8	0	0	0	0	0	2	0
4	DF	(Brazil) BRA	Paulo Turra	42	0	31	0	1	0	0	0	10	0
5	DF	(Portugal) POR	Pedro Emanuel	42	0	28	0	2	0	1	0	11	0
6	DF	(Brazil) BRA	Erivan	35	0	23	0	2	0	0	0	10	0
7	DF	(Portugal) POR	Jorge Silva	29	0	20	0	1	0	1	0	7	0
15	DF	(France) FRA	William Quevedo	2	0	1	0	0	0	1	0	0	0
17	DF	(Portugal) POR	José Bosingwa	22	0	15	0	0	0	0	0	7	0
19	DF	(Portugal) POR	Mário Loja	29	0	22	0	2	0	0	0	5	0
23	DF	(Portugal) POR	Nuno Frechaut	37	3	25	3	1	0	1	0	10	0
Midfielders
	MF	(Guinea-Bissau) GNB	Braíma Injai	0	0	0	0	0	0	0	0	0	0
13	MF	(Portugal) POR	Luís Pedrosa	12	0	12	0	0	0	0	0	0	0
14	MF	(Brazil) BRA	Geraldo Oliveira	9	1	9	1	0	0	0	0	0	0
18	MF	(Portugal) POR	Pedro Santos	16	0	9	0	1	0	1	0	5	0
21	MF	(Portugal) POR	Filipe Gouveia	13	2	11	2	1	0	0	0	1	0
25	MF	(Portugal) POR	Petit	36	5	25	4	2	1	0	0	9	0
30	MF	(Brazil) BRA	Alexandre Goulart	37	10	23	7	2	2	0	0	12	1
37	MF	(Bolivia) BOL	Erwin Sánchez	44	9	29	6	2	0	1	0	12	3
55	MF	(Brazil) BRA	Glauber Farias	11	0	5	0	2	0	1	0	3	0
Forwards
8	FW	(Brazil) BRA	Duda	40	4	26	3	1	0	1	0	12	1
9	FW	(Brazil) BRA	Serginho Baiano	30	7	22	7	2	0	1	0	5	0
10	FW	(Brazil) BRA	Márcio Mixirica	27	5	17	5	2	0	0	0	8	0
11	FW	(Brazil) BRA	Elpídio Silva	39	12	27	8	1	0	0	0	11	4
16	FW	(Portugal) POR	Martelinho	33	7	22	6	2	0	1	0	8	1
20	FW	(Portugal) POR	Jorge Couto	12	0	11	0	0	0	0	0	1	0
22	FW	(Portugal) POR	João Paulo	5	0	5	0	0	0	0	0	0	0
27	FW	(Portugal) POR	Rui Lima	15	1	13	1	0	0	0	0	2	0

=== Clean sheets ===
As of the end of the 2001–02 season.

Rnk	Pos	No.	Player	Primeira Liga	Taça de Portugal	Supertaça	Champions League	Total
1	GK	1	(Portugal) Ricardo	19	0	0	2	21
2	GK	12	(Cameroon) William Andem	5	1	0	0	6
3	GK	24	(Senegal) Khadim Faye	1	0	0	0	1
TOTALS				25	1	0	2	28

=== Transfers ===
==== In ====
Pos.	Nat.	Name	Age	Moving from	Type	Transfer Window	Transfer fee	Sources
MF	(Brazil)	Glauber Farias	26	Paços de Ferreira	Transfer	Summer	Free	
DF	(Portugal)	Luís Pedrosa	29	Salgueiros	Transfer	Summer	Free	
DF	(Portugal)	Mário Loja	23	Vitória de Setúbal	Transfer	Summer	Free	
MF	(Brazil)	Alexandre Goulart	24	Betim	Transfer	Summer	Free	
FW	(Brazil)	Márcio Mixirica	26	Galatasaray	Transfer	Summer	Undisclosed Fee	
DF	(Brazil)	Paulo Turra	27	Palmeiras	Transfer	Summer	750,000 (PTE)	
FW	(Brazil)	Serginho Baiano	23	Corinthians Alagoano	Transfer	Summer	Free	
DF	(Argentina)	Fernando Ávalos	23	Basel	Transfer	Winter	Free	

==== Out ====
Pos.	Nat.	Name	Age	Moving to	Type	Transfer Window	Transfer fee	Sources
DF	(Portugal)	Marco Aleixo	25	Leixões	Transfer	Summer	Free transfer (Released)	
MF	(Portugal)	Almami Moreira	23	Standard Liège	Transfer	Summer	Undisclosed Fee	
FW	(Brazil)	Whelliton	28	Córdoba	Transfer	Summer	1,200,000 (PTE)	
DF	(Brazil)	Marçal	26	Vitória de Setúbal	Transfer	Summer	Free	
FW	(Cameroon)	Roudolphe Douala	22	Gil Vicente	Loan	Summer	Free	
GK	(Portugal)	Sérgio Leite	21	Penafiel	Loan	Summer	Free	
DF	(Portugal)	Sérgio Carvalho	24	Varzim	Loan	Summer	Free	
MF	(Portugal)	Rui Bento	29	Sporting CP	Transfer	Summer	Undisclosed Fee	
DF	(Portugal)	Flávio Cerqueira	19	Sporting de Espinho	Loan	Summer	Free	
MF	(Brazil)	Geraldo Oliveira	28	Beira-Mar	Transfer	Summer	Free	
DF	(Portugal)	Joel Neves	19	Portosantense	Transfer	Summer	Free	
FW	(Cameroon)	Alain Ekwe	19	Gondomar	Transfer	Summer	Free	
DF	(Portugal)	Paulinho		Gondomar	Transfer	Summer	Free	
MF	(Angola)	Jaime Linares	19	Olhanense	Transfer	Summer	Free	
MF	(Portugal)	Raul Meireles	18	Desportivo das Aves	Loan	Summer	Free	
DF	(Portugal)	Litos	27	Málaga	Transfer	Summer	Undisclosed Fee	
FW	(Brazil)	Demétrius	30	Beira-Mar	Transfer	Summer	Free transfer (Released)	
DF	(France)	William Quevedo	30	Sochaux	Transfer	Summer	Undisclosed Fee	
MF	(Guinea-Bissau)	Braíma Injai	26	Leça	Transfer	Winter	Free transfer (Released)	
MF	(Portugal)	António Gouveia	28	Paços de Ferreira	Loan	Winter	Free	

=== Disciplinary record ===
As of the end of the 2001–02 season.

Rnk	Pos.	No.	Player	Primeira Liga			Taça de Portugal			Supertaça			Europe			Total		
Rnk	Pos.	No.	Player	Booked	(yellow card) (yellow-red card)	Sent off (straight red)	Booked	(yellow card) (yellow-red card)	Sent off (straight red)	Booked	(yellow card) (yellow-red card)	Sent off (straight red)	Booked	(yellow card) (yellow-red card)	Sent off (straight red)	Booked	(yellow card) (yellow-red card)	Sent off (straight red)
1	MF	25	(Portugal) Petit	10	0	0	1	0	0	0	0	0	4	0	0	15	0	0
2	DF	23	(Portugal) Nuno Frechaut	10	0	0	1	0	0	0	1	0	2	0	0	13	1	0
3	DF	5	(Portugal) Pedro Emanuel	8	1	0	1	0	0	0	0	0	3	0	0	12	1	0
4	DF	4	(Brazil) Paulo Turra	7	1	0	0	0	0	0	0	0	3	0	0	10	1	0
5	FW	8	(Brazil) Duda	7	0	0	0	0	0	0	0	0	0	0	0	7	0	0
6	DF	19	(Portugal) Mário Loja	5	0	0	0	0	0	0	0	0	0	0	0	5	0	0
7	FW	16	(Portugal) Martelinho	4	0	0	1	0	0	0	0	0	1	0	0	6	0	0
8	MF	37	(Bolivia) Erwin Sánchez	4	1	0	0	0	0	0	0	0	1	0	0	5	1	0
9	FW	9	(Brazil) Serginho Baiano	4	0	0	1	0	0	0	0	0	0	0	0	5	0	0
10	DF	6	(Brazil) Erivan	3	0	0	1	0	0	0	0	0	1	0	0	5	0	0
11	DF	2	(Portugal) Rui Óscar	3	1	0	0	0	0	0	0	0	1	0	0	4	1	0
11	FW	11	(Brazil) Elpídio Silva	3	1	0	0	0	0	0	0	0	1	0	0	4	1	0
13	DF	7	(Portugal) Jorge Silva	3	1	0	0	0	0	0	0	0	1	0	0	3	1	0
14	FW	10	(Brazil) Márcio Mixirica	3	0	0	0	0	0	0	0	0	0	0	0	3	0	0
14	MF	30	(Brazil) Alexandre Goulart	3	0	0	0	0	0	0	0	0	0	0	0	3	0	0
16	DF	17	(Portugal) José Bosingwa	2	0	0	0	0	0	0	0	0	2	0	0	4	0	0
16	MF	18	(Portugal) Pedro Santos	2	0	0	0	0	0	0	0	0	2	0	0	4	0	0
18	FW	20	(Portugal) Jorge Couto	2	0	0	0	0	0	0	0	0	1	0	0	3	0	0
19	DF	3	(Argentina) Fernando Ávalos	1	0	0	0	0	0	0	0	0	2	0	0	3	0	0
19	MF	55	(Brazil) Glauber Farias	1	0	0	0	0	0	0	0	0	2	0	0	3	0	0
21	MF	21	(Portugal) António Gouveia	1	0	0	0	0	0	0	0	0	1	0	0	2	0	0
22	MF	13	(Portugal) Luís Pedrosa	1	0	0	0	0	0	0	0	0	0	0	0	1	0	0
22	FW	27	(Portugal) Rui Lima	1	0	0	0	0	0	0	0	0	0	0	0	1	0	0
24	GK	1	(Portugal) Ricardo	0	0	2	1	0	0	0	0	0	1	0	0	2	0	2
TOTALS				88	6	2	7	0	0	0	1	0	29	0	0	124	7	2

=== Overview ===
As of the end of the 2001–02 season.

Games played	49 (34 Primeira Liga, 2 Taça de Portugal, 12 UEFA Champions League, 1 Supertaça Cândido de Oliveira)
Games won	25 (21 Primeira Liga, 1 Taça de Portugal, 3 UEFA Champions League)
Games drawn	11 (7 Primeira Liga, 4 UEFA Champions League)
Games lost	13 (6 Primeira Liga, 1 Taça de Portugal, 5 UEFA Champions League, 1 Supertaça Cândido de Oliveira)
Goals scored	66 (53 Primeira Liga, 3 Taça de Portugal, 10 UEFA Champions League)
Goals conceded	37 (20 Primeira Liga, 1 Taça de Portugal, 15 UEFA Champions League, 1 Supertaça Cândido de Oliveira)
Goal difference	+29 (+33 Primeira Liga, +2 Taça de Portugal, -5 UEFA Champions League, -1 Supertaça Cândido de Oliveira)
Clean sheets	24 (21 Primeira Liga, 1 Taça de Portugal 2 UEFA Champions League)
Yellow cards	124 (88 Primeira Liga, 7 Taça de Portugal, 29 UEFA Champions League)
Red cards	2 (1 Primeira Liga)
Worst discipline	Petit (15 (yellow card) )
Best result(s)	W 5 – 0 (H) v Paços de Ferreira – Primeira Liga – 6 November 2001
Worst result(s)	L 1 – 4 (A) v Porto – Primeira Liga – 19 August 2001, 0 – 3 (A) v Manchester United – UEFA Champions League – 5 December 2001, 0 – 3 (H) v Manchester United – UEFA Champions League – 19 March 2002
Most Appearances	Ricardo (42 appearances)
Top scorer(s)	Elpídio Silva (12 goals)
