= 2002–03 Boavista F.C. season =

Boavista F.C.
2002–03 season
- Head coach: Jaime Pacheco
- Stadium: Estádio do Bessa
- Primeira Liga: 10th
- Taça de Portugal: Fourth round
- UEFA Champions League: Third qualifying round
- UEFA Cup: Semi-finals
- Top goalscorer: League: Silva (10); All: Silva (15)

The 2002–03 season was the 100th in the history of Boavista F.C. and their 35th consecutive season in the top flight. The club participated in the Primeira Liga, the Taça de Portugal, the UEFA Champions League, and the UEFA Cup.

== Players ==
Note: Flags indicate national team as defined under FIFA eligibility rules; some limited exceptions apply. Players may hold more than one non-FIFA nationality.

No.	Pos.	Nation	Player
1	GK	POR	Ricardo
24	GK	SEN	Khadim Faye
70	GK	CMR	Bassey William Andem
2	DF	POR	Rui Óscar
3	DF	ARG	Fernando Ávalos
4	DF	BRA	Paulo Turra
5	DF	BRA	Éder Gaúcho
6	DF	BRA	Erivan
17	DF	POR	José Bosingwa
19	DF	POR	Mário Loja

No.	Pos.	Nation	Player
27	DF	POR	Pedrosa
10	MF	POR	Jorge Couto
18	MF	VEN	Pedro Santos
21	MF	BRA	Jocivalter
37	MF	BOL	Erwin Sánchez
11	FW	BRA	Silva
16	FW	POR	Martelinho
22	FW	POR	Cafú
26	FW	BRA	Luiz Cláudio
30	FW	BRA	Alexandre Goulart

== Pre-season and friendlies ==
Win Draw Loss

17 July 2002 Friendly	Metz (France)	0–2	(Portugal) Boavista	France

20 July 2002 Friendly	Penafiel (Portugal)	1–2	(Portugal) Boavista	Portugal

25 July 2002 Friendly	Feirense (Portugal)	1–3	(Portugal) Boavista	Portugal

18 August 2002 Friendly	Aves (Portugal)	1–3	(Portugal) Boavista	Portugal

== Competitions ==
=== Overall record ===
Competition	First match	Last match	Starting round	Final position	Record							
Competition	First match	Last match	Starting round	Final position	Pld	W	D	L	GF	GA	GD	Win %
Primeira Liga	22 August 2002	1 June 2003	Matchday 1	10th	34	10	13	11	32	31	+1	29.41
Taça de Portugal	23 November 2002		Fourth round	Fourth round	1	0	0	1	0	4	−4	0.00
UEFA Champions League	31 July 2002	28 August 2002	Second qualifying round	Third qualifying round	4	1	2	1	7	4	+3	25.00
UEFA Cup	19 September 2002	24 April 2003	First round	Semi-finals	12	6	1	5	14	11	+3	50.00
Total					51	17	16	18	53	50	+3	33.33

Source: Competitions

=== Primeira Liga ===
==== League table ====
Pos	Team	Pld	W	D	L	GF	GA	GD	Pts
8	Gil Vicente	34	13	5	16	42	53	−11	44
9	Belenenses	34	11	10	13	47	48	−1	43
10	Boavista	34	10	13	11	32	31	+1	43
11	Nacional	34	9	13	12	40	46	−6	40
12	Moreirense	34	9	12	13	42	46	−4	39

Source: Primeira Liga
Rules for classification: 1) points; 2) head-to-head points; 3) head-to-head goal difference; 4) goal difference; 5) number of goals scored

==== Results summary ====
Overall								Home						Away					
Pld	W	D	L	GF	GA	GD	Pts	W	D	L	GF	GA	GD	W	D	L	GF	GA	GD
34	10	13	11	32	31	+1	43	8	4	5	19	12	+7	2	9	6	13	19	−6

==== Results by round ====
Round	1	2	3	4	5	6	7	8	9	10	11	12	13	14	15	16	17	18	19	20	21	22	23	24	25	26	27	28	29	30	31	32	33	34
Ground	A	H	A	H	A																													
Result	D	L	W	W	L	W	L	L	D	D	L	L	W	D	D	L	D	W	L	W	D	D	D	W	D	L	D	L	W	D	W	D	L	W
Position	9	13	10	7	10	8	10	10	11	12																								

A = Away; H = Home; W = Win; D = Draw; L = Loss

==== Matches ====
22 August 2002 1	Vitória de Setúbal	1–1	Boavista	Setúbal
WEST (UTC+1)				Stadium: Estádio do Bonfim

2 September 2002 2	Boavista	0–1	Porto	Porto
WEST (UTC+1)				Stadium: Estádio do Bessa

13 September 2002 3	Académica	0–1	Boavista	Coimbra
WEST (UTC+1)				Stadium: Estádio Cidade de Coimbra

24 September 2002 4	Boavista	1–0	Santa Clara	Porto
WEST (UTC+1)				Stadium: Estádio do Bessa

29 September 2002 5	Paços de Ferreira	3–1	Boavista	Paços de Ferreira
WEST (UTC+1)				Stadium: Estádio da Mata Real

8 October 2002 6	Boavista	2–1	Varzim	Porto
WEST (UTC+1)				Stadium: Estádio do Bessa

19 October 2002 7	Braga	1–0	Boavista	Braga
WEST (UTC+1)				Stadium: Estádio Primeiro de Maio

26 October 2002 8	Boavista	1–2	Sporting CP	Porto
WEST (UTC+1)				Stadium: Estádio do Bessa

4 November 2002 9	Belenenses	0–0	Boavista	Lisbon
WEST (UTC+1)				Stadium: Estádio do Restelo

9 November 2002 10	Boavista	0–0	Moreirense	Porto
WEST (UTC+1)				Stadium: Estádio do Bessa

18 November 2002 11	Boavista	0–1	Gil Vicente	Porto
WEST (UTC+1)				Stadium: Estádio do Bessa

2 December 2002 12	Vitória de Guimarães	3–1	Boavista	Guimarães
WEST (UTC+1)				Stadium: Estádio D. Afonso Henriques

8 December 2002 13	Boavista	3–0	Marítimo	Porto
WEST (UTC+1)				Stadium: Estádio do Bessa

16 December 2002 14	Beira-Mar	3–3	Boavista	Aveiro
WEST (UTC+1)				Stadium: Estádio Mário Duarte

21 December 2002 15	Boavista	0–0	Benfica	Porto
WEST (UTC+1)				Stadium: Estádio do Bessa

4 January 2003 16	União de Leiria	1–0	Boavista	Leiria
WEST (UTC+1)				Stadium: Estádio Municipal da Marinha Grande

12 January 2003 17	Boavista	0–0	Nacional	Porto
WEST (UTC+1)				Stadium: Estádio do Bessa

19 January 2003 18	Boavista	1–0	Vitória de Setúbal	Porto
WEST (UTC+1)				Stadium: Estádio do Bessa

25 January 2003 19	Porto	1–0	Boavista	Porto
WEST (UTC+1)				Stadium: [[]]

1 February 2003 20	Boavista	4–0	Académica	Porto
WEST (UTC+1)				Stadium: Estádio do Bessa

7 February 2003 21	Santa Clara	1–1	Boavista	Ponta Delgada
WEST (UTC+1)				Stadium: [[]]

15 February 2003 22	Boavista	0–0	Paços de Ferreira	Porto
WEST (UTC+1)				Stadium: Estádio do Bessa

23 February 2003 23	Varzim	1–1	Boavista	Póvoa de Varzim
WEST (UTC+1)				Stadium: Estádio do Varzim Sport Club

3 March 2003 24	Boavista	2–1	Braga	Porto
WEST (UTC+1)				Stadium: Estádio do Bessa

16 March 2003 25	Sporting CP	1–1	Boavista	Lisbon
WEST (UTC+1)				Stadium: [[]]

24 March 2003 26	Boavista	1–3	Belenenses	Porto
WEST (UTC+1)				Stadium: Estádio do Bessa

5 April 2003 27	Moreirense	1–1	Boavista	Moreira de Cónegos
WEST (UTC+1)				Stadium: [[]]

18 April 2003 28	Gil Vicente	1–0	Boavista	Barcelos
WEST (UTC+1)				Stadium: Estádio Adelino Ribeiro Novo

28 April 2003 29	Boavista	3–1	Vitória de Guimarães	Porto
WEST (UTC+1)				Stadium: Estádio do Bessa

4 May 2003 30	Marítimo	0–0	Boavista	Funchal
WEST (UTC+1)				Stadium: Estádio dos Barreiros

9 May 2003 31	Boavista	1–0	Beira-Mar	Porto
WEST (UTC+1)				Stadium: Estádio do Bessa

18 May 2003 32	Benfica	1–1	Boavista	Lisbon
WEST (UTC+1)				Stadium: Estádio Nacional

26 May 2003 33	Boavista	0–1	União de Leiria	Porto
WEST (UTC+1)				Stadium: Estádio do Bessa

1 June 2003 34	Nacional	0–1	Boavista	Funchal
WEST (UTC+1)				Stadium: Estádio da Madeira

=== Taça de Portugal ===
23 November 2002 Fourth round	Santa Clara	4–0	Boavista	Ponta Delgada
WEST (UTC+1)				Stadium: Estádio de São Miguel

=== UEFA Champions League ===
==== Second qualifying round ====
31 July 2002 First leg	Boavista (Portugal)	4–0	(Malta) Hibernians	Porto
--:-- WEST (UTC+1)				Stadium: Estádio do Bessa

7 August 2002 Second leg	Hibernians (Malta)	3–3 (3–7 agg.)	(Portugal) Boavista	Ta' Qali, Malta
--:-- WEST (UTC+1)				Stadium: Ta' Qali National Stadium

==== Third qualifying round ====
13 August 2002 First leg	Boavista (Portugal)	0–1	(France) Auxerre	Porto
--:-- WEST (UTC+1)				Stadium: Estádio do Bessa

28 August 2002 Second leg	Auxerre (France)	0–0 (1–0 agg.)	(Portugal) Boavista	Auxerre, France
--:-- WEST (UTC+1)				Stadium: Stade de l'Abbé-Deschamps

=== UEFA Cup ===
==== First round ====
19 September 2002 First leg	Maccabi Tel Aviv (Israel)	1–0	(Portugal) Boavista	Sofia, Bulgaria
--:-- WEST (UTC+1)				Stadium: Balgarska Armiya Stadium

3 October 2002 Second leg	Boavista (Portugal)	4–1 (4–2 agg.)	(Israel) Maccabi Tel Aviv	Porto
--:-- WEST (UTC+1)				Stadium: Estádio do Bessa

==== Second round ====
31 October 2002 First leg	Boavista (Portugal)	2–1	(Cyprus) Anorthosis Famagusta	Porto
--:-- WEST (UTC+1)				Stadium: Estádio do Bessa

14 November 2002 Second leg	Anorthosis Famagusta (Cyprus)	0–1 (1–3 agg.)	(Portugal) Boavista	Nicosia, Cyprus
--:-- WEST (UTC+1)				Stadium: GSP Stadium

==== Third round ====
26 November 2002 First leg	Paris Saint-Germain (France)	2–1	(Portugal) Boavista	Paris, France
--:-- CET (UTC+1)				Stadium: Parc des Princes

12 December 2002 Second leg	Boavista (Portugal)	1–0 (2 (a)–2 agg.)	(France) Paris Saint-Germain	Porto
22:30 WEST (UTC+1)				Stadium: Estádio do Bessa; Attendance: 5,592

==== Fourth round ====
20 February 2003 First leg	Hertha Berlin (Germany)	3–2	(Portugal) Boavista	Berlin, Germany
18:15 CEST (UTC+2)	Alves 15', 43'; Van Burik 90+2'		Rui Óscar 37'; Alexandre 81'	Stadium: Olympic Stadium; Referee: Graham Barber (England)

27 February 2003 Second leg	Boavista (Portugal)	1–0 (3 (a)–3 agg.)	(Germany) Hertha Berlin	Porto
21:30 WEST (UTC+1)	Ávalos 84'			Stadium: Estádio do Bessa; Attendance: 5,071; Referee: Alain Hamer (Luxembourg)

==== Quarter-finals ====
13 March 2003 First leg	Málaga (Spain)	1–0	(Portugal) Boavista	Málaga, Spain
21:30 CEST (UTC+2)	Dely Valdés 17'	Report		Stadium: La Rosaleda Stadium; Attendance: 13,269; Referee: Pierluigi Collina (Italy)

20 March 2003 Second leg	Boavista (Portugal)	1–0 (a.e.t.) (1–1 agg.) (4–1 p)	(Spain) Málaga	Porto
22:00 WEST (UTC+1)	Luiz Cláudio 83'	Report		Stadium: Estádio do Bessa; Attendance: 8,500; Referee: Gilles Veissière (France)
	Penalties
	Alexandre (penalty scored); Luiz Cláudio (penalty scored); Silva (penalty scored); Ricardo (penalty scored)		(penalty missed) Bravo; (penalty scored) Miguel Ángel; (penalty missed) Leko

==== Semi-finals ====
10 April 2003 First leg	Celtic (Scotland)	1–1	(Portugal) Boavista	Glasgow, Scotland
20:05 BST (UTC+1)	Larsson 49'		Valgaeren 48' (o.g.)	Stadium: Celtic Park; Attendance: 58,240; Referee: Frank De Bleeckere (Belgium)

24 April 2003 Second leg	Boavista (Portugal)	0–1 (1–2 agg.)	(Scotland) Celtic	Porto
21:00 WEST (UTC+1)		Report	Larsson 79'	Stadium: Estádio do Bessa; Attendance: 10,163; Referee: Valentin Ivanov (Russia)

== Statistics ==
=== Appearances and goals ===
No.	Pos	Nat	Player	Total		Primeira Liga		Taça de Portugal		UEFA Champions League		UEFA Cup	
No.	Pos	Nat	Player	Apps	Goals	Apps	Goals	Apps	Goals	Apps	Goals	Apps	Goals
Goalkeepers
1	GK	(Portugal) POR	Ricardo	33	0	33	0	0	0	0	0	0	0
Defenders
3	DF	(Argentina) ARG	Fernando Ávalos	32	0	32	0	0	0	0	0	0	0
17	DF	(Portugal) POR	José Bosingwa	26	0	26	0	0	0	0	0	0	0
Midfielders
10	MF	(Portugal) POR	Jorge Couto	20	2	20	2	0	0	0	0	0	0
37	MF	(Bolivia) BOL	Erwin Sánchez	12	1	12	1	0	0	0	0	0	0
Forwards
11	FW	(Brazil) BRA	Silva	30	10	30	10	0	0	0	0	0	0
16	FW	(Portugal) POR	Martelinho	27	1	27	1	0	0	0	0	0	0
Players transferred out during the season

Last updated: 1 June 2003
Source: Competitions
