= 2001 Supertaça Cândido de Oliveira =

- Event: Supertaça Cândido de Oliveira (Portuguese Super Cup)
Boavista	Porto
0	1
- Date: 4 August 2001
- Venue: Estádio do Rio Ave FC, Vila do Conde
- Man of the Match: Fredrik Söderström (Porto)
- Referee: Martins dos Santos (Porto)

The 2001 Supertaça Cândido de Oliveira was the 23rd edition of the Supertaça Cândido de Oliveira, the annual Portuguese football season-opening match contested by the winners of the previous season's top league and cup competitions (or cup runner-up in case the league- and cup-winning club is the same). The match took place on the 4 August 2001 at the Estádio do Rio Ave FC in Vila do Conde, and was contested between 2000–01 Primeira Liga winners Boavista, and 2000–01 Taça de Portugal winners Porto.

In Portugal, the final was televised live on RTP. Porto would defeat Boavista 1–0. A 22nd minute headed goal from central defender Jorge Andrade was sufficient for the Dragões to defeat Os Axadrezados and claim the Supertaça Cândido de Oliveira for a 12th time in their history.

== Match ==
=== Details ===
4 August 2001
21:00 WEST

Boavista	0–1	Porto
		Andrade 22'

Estádio do Rio Ave FC, Vila do Conde
Referee: Martins dos Santos (Porto)

Boavista	Porto

GK	1	(Portugal) Ricardo (c)
RB	2	(Portugal) Rui Óscar
CB	7	(Portugal) Jorge Silva		(substituted off) 70'
CB	5	(Portugal) Pedro Emanuel
LB	15	(France) William Quevedo
CM	23	(Portugal) Nuno Frechaut	(yellow card) 2' (red card) 86'
CM	55	(Brazil) Glauber		(substituted off) 66'
RM	16	(Portugal) Martelinho		(substituted off) 46'
AM	37	(Bolivia) Erwin Sánchez
LM	8	(Brazil) Duda
CF	11	(Brazil) Elpídio Silva
Substitutes:
DF	19	(Portugal) Mário Loja		(substituted on) 70'
MF	18	(Portugal) Pedro Santos		(substituted on) 66'
FW	9	(Brazil) Serginho Baiano		(substituted on) 46'
Manager:
(Portugal) Jaime Pacheco

GK	55	(Russia) Sergei Ovchinnikov
RB	17	(Argentina) Hugo Ibarra
CB	2	(Portugal) Jorge Costa (c)
CB	13	(Portugal) Jorge Andrade	(yellow card) 86'
LB	30	(Portugal) Mário Silva
CM	5	(Paraguay) Carlos Paredes	(yellow card) 34'
CM	14	(Sweden) Fredrik Söderström
RM	21	(Portugal) Capucho
AM	10	(Brazil) Deco		(substituted off) 86'
LM	28	(Brazil) Clayton	(yellow card) 24'	(substituted off) 69'
CF	31	(Brazil) Pena	(yellow card) 44'
Substitutes:
DF	11	(Brazil) Rubens Júnior		(substituted on) 69'
MF	19	(Brazil) Rafael		(substituted on) 86'
Manager:
(Portugal) Octávio Machado

2001 Supertaça Cândido de Oliveira Winners
Porto
12th Title

- (Sweden) Fredrik Söderström (Porto)

Match officials

- Assistant referees:
- Fourth official:

Match rules

- 90 minutes
- 30 minutes of extra time if necessary.
- Penalty shoot-out if scores level after extra-time
- Maximum of three substitutions

== See also ==
- 2001–02 Primeira Liga
- 2001–02 Taça de Portugal
- 2001–02 Boavista F.C. season
