= 2000–01 Taça de Portugal =

Tournament details
- Country: Portugal
- Dates: September 2000 – 10 June 2001
- Teams: 228

Final positions
- Champions: Porto (11th title)
- Runners-up: Marítimo

Tournament statistics
- Top goal scorer(s): Alberto Acosta (5 goals)

The 2000–01 Taça de Portugal was the 61st edition of the Portuguese football knockout tournament, organized by the Portuguese Football Federation (FPF). The 2000–01 Taça de Portugal began in September 2000. The final was played on 10 June 2001 at the Estádio Nacional.

Porto were the previous holders, having defeated Sporting CP 2–0 in the previous season's final in cup final which went to a replay. Porto defeated Marítimo, 2–0 in the final to win their eleventh Taça de Portugal. As a result of Porto winning the domestic cup competition, they faced Boavista in the 2001 Supertaça Cândido de Oliveira.

== Fifth Round ==
Ties were played between the 20 January, and the 31 January. Replays were played between the 3–9 January. Benfica's away cup tie to Louletano on 21 December was abandoned due to poor weather conditions, and was rescheduled for 3 January.

20 December 2000	Marítimo (I)	1–0 (a.e.t.)	União de Leiria (I)	Estádio dos Barreiros, Funchal
15:00	J. Santos 91'			Referee: Jorge Coroado

20 December 2000	Boavista (I)	3–0	Desportivo das Aves (I)	Estádio do Bessa, Porto
21:00	Whelliton 12'; Martelinho 58', 68'			Referee: Vítor Pereira

21 December 2000	Alverca (I)	1–1 (a.e.t.)	Paços de Ferreira (I)	Complexo Desportivo FC Alverca, Alverca do Ribatejo
19:00	Tito 30'		Marco Paulo 80'	Attendance: 100; Referee: António Costa

23 December 2000	Leça (II)	0–0 (a.e.t.)	Farense (I)	Estádio do Leça FC, Leça da Palmeira
15:00				Attendance: 300; Referee: Lucílio Batista

30 December 2000	Bragança (III)	2–0	Varzim (II)	Estádio Municipal de Bragança, Bragança
15:00	Serra 36'; Zé Gomes 37'			Referee: José Pratas

30 December 2000	Famalicão (III)	3–2 (a.e.t.)	Belenenses (I)	Estádio Municipal 22 de Junho, Vila Nova de Famalicão
15:00	Mirra 34'; Veloso 81'; Djalmir 94'		Guga 42'; Gerson 84'	Referee: José Leirós

30 December 2000	Feirense (III)	0–2	Moreirense (III)	Estádio Marcolino de Castro, Santa Maria da Feira
15:00			Lim Costa 11', 44'	Referee: Francisco Ferreira

30 December 2000	Gil Vicente (I)	1–0	Oliveirense (III)	Estádio Adelino Ribeiro Novo, Barcelos
15:00	Casquilha 21'			Referee: Isidoro Rodrigues

30 December 2000	Penafiel (II)	1–0	Infesta (III)	Estádio Municipal 25 de Abril, Penafiel
15:00	Rui Gomes 76'			Referee: Martins dos Santos

30 December 2000	Sporting CP (I)	4–1	Leixões (III)	Estádio José Alvalade, Lisbon
15:00	Pinto 7'; Acosta 43', 73'; Babb 59'		David 86'	Referee: Olegário Benquerença

30 December 2000	Felgueiras (II)	0–3	Porto (I)	Estádio Dr Machado de Matos, Felgueiras
18:00			Paredes 14', 32'; M. Santos 16' (o.g.)	Referee: Duarte Gomes

3 January 2001 Replay	Farense (I)	4–2	Leça (II)	Estádio de São Luís, Faro
15:00	Paulista 33', 54'; Campos 53'; Cavaco 55'		M. Almeida 21'; Topas 63'	Attendance: 100; Referee: João Ferreira

3 January 2001	Louletano (II)	1–3	Benfica (I)	Estádio Municipal de Loulé, Loulé
19:00	Gaúcho 57'		Van Hooijdonk 44', 48'; Tomás 52'	Referee: Bruno Paixão

9 January 2001 Replay	Paços de Ferreira (I)	3–2	Alverca (I)	Estádio da Mata Real, Paços de Ferreira
15:00	Zé Manel 36'; Leonardo 54', 74'		Viveros 49'; Ramires 82' (pen.)	Referee: Lucílio Batista

31 January 2001	Estoril (III)	3–0	Amora (IV)	Estádio António Coimbra da Mota, Estoril
15:00	Artur 1' (o.g.); Gabriel 88'; Serginho 90'			Referee: Emanuel Câmara

31 January 2001	Sanjoanense (III)	0–1	Rio Ave (II)	Estádio Conde Dias Garcia, São João da Madeira
15:00			Jacaré 12'	Referee: Luís Miranda

== Sixth Round ==
Ties were played on the 16–17 January. Replays were played between the 23 January, and the 7 February. Paços de Ferreira took a bye to the next round.

16 January 2001	Famalicão (III)	2–1	Gil Vicente (I)	Estádio Municipal 22 de Junho, Vila Nova de Famalicão
19:00	Djalmir 11', 24' (pen.)		Pinheiro 10'	Referee: António Costa

16 January 2001	Sporting CP (I)	3–3 (a.e.t.)	Nacional (II)	Estádio José Alvalade, Lisbon
21:00	Acosta 25'; Barbosa 77'; Mpenza 89'		Carvalho 37', 61'; Serginho 90' (pen.)	Referee: João Ferreira

17 January 2001	Bragança (III)	3–2	Rio Ave (II)	Estádio Municipal de Bragança, Bragança
15:00	Vicente 17'; Bebé 44', 50'		Henrique 68'; Alércio 88'	Referee: Francisco Ferreira

17 January 2001	Farense (I)	0–1	Marítimo (I)	Estádio de São Luís, Faro
15:00			João Pinto 99'	Referee: Paulo Paraty

17 January 2001	Moreirense (III)	5–2	Estoril (III)	Parque de Jogos Comendador Joaquim de Almeida Freitas, Moreira de Cónegos
15:00	Éverton 28'; Armando Silva 40', 90'; João Duarte 82'; Lim Costa 86', pen.'		Vidais 8'; Gabriel 80'	Referee: José Mesquita

17 January 2001	Benfica (I)	1–1 (a.e.t.)	Porto (I)	Estádio da Luz, Lisbon
19:00	Maniche 53'		Marić 84'	Attendance: 43,000; Referee: José Pratas

17 January 2001	Penafiel (II)	0–1	Boavista (I)	Estádio Municipal 25 de Abril, Penafiel
21:00			Ferraz 21' (o.g.)	Referee: José Pratas

23 January 2001 Replay	Porto (I)	4–0	Benfica (I)	Estádio das Antas, Porto
19:00	Alenichev 10', 67' (pen.); Pena 28'; Paredes 34'			Attendance: 16,050; Referee: Lucílio Batista

7 February 2001 Replay	Nacional (II)	0–2	Sporting CP (I)	Estádio da Madeira, Funchal
18:00			Barbosa 35'; Fabri 79'	Referee: Paulo Paraty

== Quarter-finals ==
All quarter-final ties were played on the 11–12 February.

11 February 2001	Bragança (III)	1–2	Porto (II)	Estádio Municipal de Bragança, Bragança
	Bragança 31'		Chaínho 19'; Clayton 73'	Attendance: 10,000; Referee: Augusto Duarte

11 February 2001	Moreirense (III)	1–2	Boavista (I)	Parque de Jogos Comendador Joaquim de Almeida Freitas, Moreira de Cónegos
15:00	Armando Silva 63'		Martelinho 20'; Pedro Santos 32'	Attendance: 4,000; Referee: Emanuel Câmara

11 February 2001	Paços de Ferreira (I)	1–2 (a.e.t.)	Marítimo (I)	Estádio da Mata Real, Paços de Ferreira
15:00	Zé Manel 33'		Jokanović 75' (pen.); Bakero 104'	Referee: Vítor Pereira

11 February 2001	Famalicão (III)	1–3	Sporting CP (I)	Estádio Municipal 22 de Junho, Vila Nova de Famalicão
19:00	Hélder 21'		Acosta 78'; Špehar 83', 89'	Referee: Paulo Baptista

== Semi-finals ==
Ties were played on the 21–22 March.

21 March 2001	Boavista (I)	0–1	Marítimo (I)	Estádio do Bessa, Porto
18:30			Paulo Sérgio 32'	Referee: João Ferreira

22 March 2001	Porto (I)	2–1 (a.e.t.)	Sporting CP (I)	Estádio das Antas, Porto
	Capucho 31', 100'		Beto 13'	Referee: Lucílio Batista

== Final ==
10 June 2001
17:00 WEST

Marítimo	0–2	Porto
		Pena 13'; Alenichev 79'

Estádio Nacional, Oeiras
Referee: Jorge Coroado (Lisbon)
