= Carlos Paredes (footballer) =

Paraguayan footballer and coach (born 1976)

Personal information
- Full name: Carlos Humberto Paredes Monges
- Date of birth: 16 July 1976 (age 50)
- Place of birth: Asunción, Paraguay
- Height: 1.79 m (5 ft 10 in)
- Position: Defensive midfielder

Team information
- Current team: Independiente FBC (manager)

Senior career*
Years	Team	Apps	(Gls)
1995–2000	Olimpia Asunción	79	(6)
2000–2002	FC Porto	57	(2)
2002–2006	Reggina	98	(11)
2006–2008	Sporting CP	18	(0)
2008–2009	Olimpia Asunción	16	(3)
2009–2010	Rubio Ñú	5	(0)
2010	Sportivo Luqueño	30	(3)
2011–2015	Olimpia Asunción	36	(0)
Total		339	(25)

International career
1998–2008	Paraguay	74	(10)

Managerial career
- 2015–2016: Olimpia (assistant)
- 2016: Paraguay U23
- 2016: Paraguay U20 (interim)
- 2017: Rubio Ñu
- 2017: Guaireña
- 2017–2018: Paraguay U20
- 2018–2019: Sol de América (reserves)
- 2019: Independiente FBC
- 2019–2020: Fulgencio Yegros
- 2020: Sportivo Luqueño
- 2021: Tacuary
- 2023: Tacuary
- 2024–: Independiente FBC
- * Club domestic league appearances and goals

Carlos Humberto Paredes Monges (Spanish pronunciation: [ˈkaɾlos umˈbeɾto paˈɾeðes ˈmoŋɡes]; born 16 July 1976) is a Paraguayan coach and former footballer. He is the current manager of Independiente FBC.

His style of play led the Paraguayan media to call him the "Sir of the Midfield". Paredes played defensive midfield, though he could also play as centre-forward, being a lethal header. He also had exceptional leadership capabilities on the field, where he was constantly marshalling instructions to the rest of the team.

His first major competition as a coach was the 2016 Toulon Tournament with the Paraguay national under-23 football team.

== Career ==
Paredes started his career in Club Olimpia of Paraguay in 1995, winning five national championships and becoming the youngest captain in the club's history at the age of 20. In 2000, he moved to FC Porto of Portugal, where he won the Cup of Portugal in the 2000/2001 season. In 2002, he was transferred to Reggina for €4.8million (Porto retained 25% rights to receive future transfer revenue of Reggina received). In 2006 Paredes moved to Sporting Clube de Portugal where he was allowed very little game time. In January 2008 his contract was terminated by Sporting.

Paredes returned to Paraguay in 2008 to play for the team he first played for, Olimpia. He became the team captain and undisputed leader on the field. He scored two goals in the first three games of the Apertura tournament. In 2009, Paredes moved to Rubio Ñú due to not featuring in the plans of former coach Gregorio Pérez for the 2009 Clausura Tournament. In 2010 Paredes moved to Sportivo Luqueño and to Olimpia in the following year, where he became one of the team captains.

== International career ==
Paredes played in three FIFA World Cups for Paraguay: 1998, 2002 and 2006, reaching the Round of 16 in two of them.

== Career statistics ==
=== International ===
Appearances and goals by national team and year
National team	Year	Apps	Goals
Paraguay	1998	9	0
Paraguay	1999	10	0
Paraguay	2000	11	4
Paraguay	2001	7	2
Paraguay	2002	8	1
Paraguay	2003	6	2
Paraguay	2004	9	1
Paraguay	2005	5	0
Paraguay	2006	6	0
Paraguay	2007	1	0
Paraguay	2008	2	0
Total		74	10

Scores and results list Paraguay's goal tally first, score column indicates score after each Paredes goal.

List of international goals scored by Carlos Paredes
No.	Date	Venue	Opponent	Score	Result	Competition
1	21 June 2000	Antonio Aranda Stadium, Ciudad del Este, Paraguay	Costa Rica	1–0	1–0	Friendly
2	18 July 2000	Estadio Defensores del Chaco, Asunción, Paraguay	Brazil	1–0	2–1	2002 FIFA World Cup qualification
3	2 September 2000	Estadio Defensores del Chaco, Asunción, Paraguay	Venezuela	3–0	3–0	2002 FIFA World Cup qualification
4	15 November 2000	Estadio Defensores del Chaco, Asunción, Paraguay	Peru	4–0	5–1	2002 FIFA World Cup qualification
5	2 June 2001	Estadio Defensores del Chaco, Asunción, Paraguay	Chile	1–0	1–0	2002 FIFA World Cup qualification
6	5 September 2001	Estadio Defensores del Chaco, Asunción, Paraguay	Bolivia	1–1	5–1	2002 FIFA World Cup qualification
7	17 May 2002	Råsunda Stadium, Solna, Sweden	Sweden	2–0	2–1	Friendly
8	10 September 2003	Estadio Defensores del Chaco, Asunción, Paraguay	Uruguay	2–0	4–1	2006 FIFA World Cup qualification
9	18 November 2003	Estadio Nacional, Santiago, Chile	Chile	1–0	1–0	2006 FIFA World Cup qualification
10	13 October 2004	Estadio Defensores del Chaco, Asunción, Paraguay	Peru	1–0	1–1	2006 FIFA World Cup qualification

== Honours ==
=== Club ===
Olimpia

- Primera División (6): 1995, 1997, 1998, 1999, 2000, 2011 Clausura

Porto

- Taça de Portugal (1): 2000–01
- Supertaça Cândido de Oliveira (1): 2001

Sporting CP

- Taça de Portugal (1): 2006–07
