= Portonovo SD =

Spanish football club

Portonovo
- Full name: Portonovo Sociedad Deportiva
- Nickname: Los Arlequinados
- Founded: 1948; 78 years ago
- Stadium: Estadio Baltar
- Capacity: 5,000
- President: Silverio González
- Head coach: Minso
- League: Tercera Federación – Group 1
- 2025–26: Preferente Futgal – Group 2, 2nd of 18 (promoted via play-offs)
Home colours	Away colours

Portonovo Sociedad Deportiva is a Spanish football team based in Portonovo, in the autonomous community of Galicia. Founded in 1948 it plays in Tercera Federación – Group 1, holding home matches at Estadio Baltar, which has a capacity of 5,000 spectators.

== Season to season ==
Season	Tier	Division	Place	Copa del Rey
1950–51	5	1ª Reg.	2nd	
1951–52	DNP			
1952–53	5	1ª Reg.	1st	
1953–54	5	1ª Reg.	2nd	
1954–55	5	1ª Reg.	2nd	
1955–56	5	1ª Reg.	1st	
1956–57	5	1ª Reg.	1st	
1957–58	5	1ª Reg.	3rd	
1958–59	5	1ª Reg.	9th	
1959–60	6	2ª Reg.		
1960–61	6	2ª Reg.		
1961–62	5	1ª Reg.	6th	
1962–63	5	1ª Reg.	5th	
1963–64	5	1ª Reg.	8th	
1964–65	5	1ª Reg.	9th	
1965–66	DNP			
1966–67	DNP			
1967–68	5	1ª Reg.	9th	
1968–69	5	1ª Reg.		
1969–70	5	1ª Reg.	5th	

Season	Tier	Division	Place	Copa del Rey
1970–71	5	1ª Reg.	4th	
1971–72	5	1ª Reg.	4th	
1972–73	5	1ª Reg.	2nd	
1973–74	5	1ª Reg.	1st	
1974–75	5	1ª Reg.	7th	
1975–76	5	1ª Reg.	3rd	
1976–77	5	1ª Reg.	2nd	
1977–78	6	1ª Reg.	4th	
1978–79	6	1ª Reg.	5th	
1979–80	6	1ª Reg.	9th	
1980–81	6	1ª Reg.	2nd	
1981–82	5	Reg. Pref.	5th	
1982–83	5	Reg. Pref.	9th	
1983–84	5	Reg. Pref.	16th	
1984–85	5	Reg. Pref.	1st	
1985–86	4	3ª	6th	
1986–87	4	3ª	14th	First round
1987–88	4	3ª	19th	
1988–89	5	Reg. Pref.	3rd	
1989–90	5	Reg. Pref.	8th	

Season	Tier	Division	Place	Copa del Rey
1990–91	5	Reg. Pref.	4th	
1991–92	5	Reg. Pref.	2nd	
1992–93	4	3ª	12th	
1993–94	4	3ª	18th	
1994–95	5	Reg. Pref.	9th	
1995–96	5	Reg. Pref.	10th	
1996–97	5	Reg. Pref.	16th	
1997–98	5	Reg. Pref.	4th	
1998–99	5	Reg. Pref.	7th	
1999–2000	5	Reg. Pref.	11th	
2000–01	5	Reg. Pref.	6th	
2001–02	5	Reg. Pref.	1st	
2002–03	4	3ª	16th	
2003–04	4	3ª	15th	
2004–05	4	3ª	14th	
2005–06	4	3ª	12th	
2006–07	4	3ª	8th	
2007–08	4	3ª	15th	
2008–09	4	3ª	18th	
2009–10	5	Pref. Aut.	1st	

Season	Tier	Division	Place	Copa del Rey
2010–11	4	3ª	19th	
2011–12	5	Pref. Aut.	11th	
2012–13	5	Pref. Aut.	4th	
2013–14	5	Pref. Aut.	11th	
2014–15	5	Pref. Aut.	3rd	
2015–16	5	Pref.	14th	
2016–17	5	Pref.	18th	
2017–18	6	1ª Gal.	4th	
2018–19	6	1ª Gal.	1st	
2019–20	5	Pref.	17th	
2020–21	DNP			
2021–22	6	Pref.	4th	
2022–23	6	Pref.	9th	
2023–24	6	Pref.	5th	
2024–25	6	Pref. Futgal	11th	
2025–26	6	Pref. Futgal	2nd	
2026–27	5	3ª Fed.		

- 13 seasons in Tercera División
- 1 season in Tercera Federación

== Notable former players ==
- (Spain) Fran Castaño
- (Spain) Aitor Díaz
- (Spain) Óscar Guimeráns
- (Portugal) Martelinho
- (Uruguay) Lautaro de León
