= Sérgio Leite =

Portuguese footballer

Personal information
- Full name: Sérgio Barbosa Dias Leite
- Date of birth: 16 August 1979 (age 47)
- Place of birth: Porto, Portugal
- Position: Goalkeeper

Youth career
- 1989–1990: Lapa
- 1990–1998: Boavista

Senior career*
Years	Team	Apps	(Gls)
1998–2003	Boavista	0	(0)
1999–2000	→ Maia (loan)	7	(0)
2000–2001	→ Espinho (loan)	31	(0)
2001–2002	→ Penafiel (loan)	16	(0)
2003	→ Leça (loan)	14	(0)
2003–2005	Charlton Athletic	0	(0)
2004–2005	→ Ovarense (loan)	25	(0)
2005–2006	Hull City	0	(0)
2006	Vaslui	1	(0)
2007	Braşov	15	(0)
2007–2008	Atromitos	25	(0)
2008–2009	Boavista	22	(0)
2009–2011	Gondomar	47	(0)
Total		203	(0)

International career
1995	Portugal U15	4	(0)
1996	Portugal U16	11	(0)
1997	Portugal U17	2	(0)
1996–1998	Portugal U18	24	(0)
1998–2000	Portugal U20	16	(0)
2000–2002	Portugal U21	24	(0)
- * Club domestic league appearances and goals

Sérgio Barbosa Dias Leite (born 16 August 1979) is a Portuguese retired footballer who played as a goalkeeper.

== Club career ==
After emerging from local Boavista FC's youth ranks, Porto-born Leite found it hard to find a spot in the first team, barred by William Andem first then Ricardo. He went on to serve four loans in the second division, in representation of F.C. Maia, S.C. Espinho, F.C. Penafiel and Leça FC.

Definitely released in 2003, Leite then had two unassuming spells in England, first with Charlton Athletic which also loaned him to A.D. Ovarense back in his country, then with Hull City. With the latter team until February 2006, he only had one Football League Cup appearance to his credit.

Leite spent 2006–07 with two Romanian sides, appearing only once in Liga I with FC Vaslui, then spent the following season in Cyprus with lowly Atromitos Yeroskipou. In the summer of 2008 he returned to Boavista, immersed in a deep financial crisis and now in the second level (soon to be third).

For the 2009–10 campaign, Leite moved sides again, joining Gondomar S.C. – also in division three – a club to which former Boavista chairman Valentim Loureiro also had connections. He left in June 2011 at the age of 32 and retired shortly after, subsequently working as a players' agent.

== Honours ==
Individual

- Toulon Tournament Best Goalkeeper: 2000
