= Leão (footballer) =

Portuguese footballer (born 1971)

Personal information
- Full name: Augusto Pinto Duarte Maia
- Date of birth: 22 April 1971 (age 55)
- Place of birth: Porto, Portugal
- Height: 1.79 m (5 ft 10 in)
- Position: Midfielder

Youth career
- 1984–1985: Porto
- 1985–1989: Salgueiros

Senior career*
Years	Team	Apps	(Gls)
1989–1998	Salgueiros	152	(1)
1998	Sporting	2	(0)
1999–2003	União de Leiria	133	(2)
2003–2007	Leixões	55	(0)

Managerial career
- 2008–2009: Salgueiros (U19)
- 2009–2010: Pedrouços
- 2011–2012: Salgueiros (assistant)
- * Club domestic league appearances and goals

Augusto Pinto Duarte Maia (born 22 April 1971), known as Leão, is a Portuguese football coach and a former player. He played 13 seasons and 287 games in the Portuguese Premier League for Salgueiros, União de Leiria and Sporting.

== Career ==
Leão made his Primeira Liga debut for Salgueiros on 19 August 1990 as a starter in a 1–2 loss against Tirsense.

On 15 June 2003, Leão was part of the União de Leiria team that played in the Portuguese Cup final against FC Porto.
