= Djalmir =

Brazilian footballer (born 1976)

Personal information
- Full name: Djalmir Vieira de Andrade
- Date of birth: 22 April 1976 (age 50)
- Place of birth: Aracaju, Brazil
- Height: 1.85 m (6 ft 1 in)
- Position: Striker

Team information
- Current team: Almancilense

Senior career*
Years	Team	Apps	(Gls)
1998–1999	Sergipe		
2000	Cascavel		
2000–2001	Famalicão	41	(30)
2002–2003	Belenenses	24	(4)
2003–2004	Salgueiros	29	(6)
2004–2006	Feirense	55	(19)
2006–2013	Olhanense	131	(55)
2018	Olhanense	4	(0)
2019–	Almancilense	26	(12)
Total		310	(126)
- * Club domestic league appearances and goals as of 22 February 2020

Djalmir Vieira de Andrade (born 22 April 1976), known simply as Djalmir, is a Brazilian footballer who plays for S.R. Almancilense as a striker.

He totalled 239 games over 12 seasons across the two major levels of Portuguese football, amassing Primeira Liga totals of 79 matches and 21 goals, mainly with Olhanense for which he made 145 official appearances (60 goals).

== Club career ==
Djalmir was born in Aracaju, Sergipe. After only playing for modest clubs in his homeland, he moved to Portugal in 2000, going on to remain in the country for the following 12 years. He started with F.C. Famalicão in the third division and, after scoring 15 goals in each of his two seasons (only playing in the first half of 2001–02), moved straight to the Primeira Liga with C.F. Os Belenenses, where he failed to reproduce his previous form.

From 2003 to 2009, Djalmir competed in the Segunda Liga, with S.C. Salgueiros, C.D. Feirense and S.C. Olhanense. In the latter season, while at the service of the last, he netted a career-best 20 goals in 27 matches, helping the Algarve side return to the top flight after a lengthy absence. In 2009–10, he added 12 in only 17 appearances as they retained their league status.

Djalmir was used sparingly in the following campaigns. On 1 May 2011, however, he scored in the 93rd minute for the final 1–1 home draw against S.L. Benfica, which certified his team's permanence.

On 22 June 2012, Djalmir confirmed he would be leaving Olhanense. He retired from football the following month, being immediately appointed as his main club's director of football; however, after only a couple of months, the 36-year-old returned to active, as the team was struggling with several injuries.

Djalmir came out of retirement for a second time in October 2018, rejoining Olhanense, who now competed in the third tier, as well as announcing plans to run for its president in the upcoming elections. In the following transfer window, he signed with amateurs S.R. Almancilense in the same region.
