= Nuno Afonso =

Portuguese footballer (born 1974)

Personal information
- Full name: Nuno Miguel Figueiredo Afonso
- Date of birth: 6 October 1974 (age 52)
- Place of birth: Oeiras, Portugal
- Height: 1.90 m (6 ft 3 in)
- Position: Centre-back

Youth career
- 1985–1987: Estrela Amadora
- 1987–1993: Benfica

Senior career*
Years	Team	Apps	(Gls)
1993–1994	Benfica	1	(0)
1994–1995	Belenenses	18	(0)
1995–1996	Campomaiorense	23	(0)
1996–1997	Salamanca	2	(0)
1997–1998	Vitória Setúbal	10	(0)
1998–1999	Paços Ferreira	7	(0)
1999–2000	Marítimo	15	(0)
1999–2000	Marítimo B	4	(0)
2000–2001	Aves	21	(1)
2001–2002	Oliveirense	16	(1)
2003	Díter Zafra	17	(0)
Total		134	(2)

International career
1990−1991	Portugal U16	23	(1)
1991−1992	Portugal U17	10	(0)
1990−1993	Portugal U18	24	(0)
1993	Portugal U20	5	(0)
1994−1996	Portugal U21	15	(0)
1996	Portugal U23	2	(0)
- * Club domestic league appearances and goals

Nuno Miguel Figueiredo Afonso (born 6 October 1974) is a Portuguese former professional footballer who played as a central defender.

== Club career ==
Afonso was born in Oeiras, Lisbon metropolitan area. During his professional career, he represented S.L. Benfica (being part of the squad that won the Primeira Liga title in the 1993–94 campaign), C.F. Os Belenenses, S.C. Campomaiorense, Vitória de Setúbal, F.C. Paços de Ferreira, C.S. Marítimo, C.D. Aves and U.D. Oliveirense, having abroad stints with UD Salamanca – contributing just 157 minutes to a 1997 promotion to La Liga – and CD Díter Zafra (also in Spain), retiring at only 28.

In his country's top flight, Afonso achieved totals of 88 games and one goal over seven seasons.

== International career ==
Afonso was a member of the Portugal team that reached fourth place at the 1996 Summer Olympics in Atlanta, Georgia. He also represented the nation at the 1993 FIFA World Youth Championship in Australia, in an eventual group-stage exit following three losses.
