= Rogério (footballer, born 1974) =

Brazilian footballer

Personal information
- Full name: José Rogério de Melo
- Date of birth: 3 October 1974 (age 52)
- Place of birth: São Paulo, Brazil
- Height: 1.79 m (5 ft 10 in)
- Position: Winger

Senior career*
| Years | Team | Apps | (Gls) |
| 1998 | Vitória | – | (–) |
| 1998–2001 | Boavista | 40 | (9) |
| 2001 | Sport | 13 | (0) |
| 2001–2002 | Vitória Setúbal | 5 | (0) |
| 2002 | Campinense | – | (–) |
| 2002–2003 | Estrela Amadora | 6 | (0) |
| 2003–2004 | Campinense | – | (–) |
| 2004–2005 | Rapid București | 1 | (0) |
| 2006 | Ipanema | – | (–) |
| 2007 | Vera Cruz | – | (–) |
- * Club domestic league appearances and goals

Jose Rogério de Melo (born 3 October 1974), commonly known as Rogério is a retired Brazilian football midfielder. During his career, Rogério played for Vitória, Boavista, Sport Club Recife, Estrela da Amadora, Campinense and Rapid București.
