= Khadim Faye =

Senegalese footballer (born 1970)

Personal information
- Full name: Khadim Faye
- Date of birth: 5 September 1970 (age 56)
- Place of birth: Dakar, Senegal
- Height: 1.97 m (6 ft 5 1/2 in)
- Position: Goalkeeper

Senior career*
Years	Team	Apps	(Gls)
1991–1996	ASC Diaraf		
1996–1998	União Montemor	51	(0)
1998–2000	Felgueiras	57	(1)
2000–2007	Boavista	20	(0)

International career
1993–2007	Senegal	6	(0)
- * Club domestic league appearances and goals

Khadim Faye (born 5 September 1970) is a Senegalese retired footballer who played as a goalkeeper.

== Club career ==
Born in Dakar, Faye started his career with hometown's ASC Diaraf, moving in 1996 to Portugal with Grupo União Sport Montemor in the third division alongside compatriot and teammate Fary Faye. He went on to remain in the country for the remainder of his career.

After helping F.C. Felgueiras finish fifth and seventh in consecutive second level seasons, Faye attracted the attention of Boavista F.C. in the Primeira Liga, but could never be more than backup with the Porto side, barred by Portuguese international Ricardo first, then Cameroonian William Andem (also an international for his country) after the former left for Sporting Clube de Portugal in 2003.

Faye was further demoted to third-choice after Boavista signed Carlos Fernandes. His best league output consisted of eight games – seven starts, 12 goals conceded – in the 2004–05 campaign as his team finished in sixth position, narrowly missing out on qualification to the UEFA Cup; aged nearly 37, he left the club and retired from football.

== International career ==
A Senegal international during 15 years – he did not receive any callups from June 1996–July 2006 however– Faye represented the nation at the 1992 African Cup of Nations, being a backup in an eventual quarter-final exit for the hosts.

== Honours ==
Diaraf

- Senegal FA Cup: 1992–93, 1993–94, 1994–95

Boavista

- Primeira Liga: 2000–01
