= Carlos Fernandes (footballer, born 1979) =

Angolan footballer

Carlos
Personal information
- Full name: Carlos Alberto Fernandes
- Date of birth: 8 December 1979 (age 46)
- Place of birth: Kinshasa, Zaire
- Height: 1.88 m (6 ft 2 in)
- Position: Goalkeeper

Youth career
- 1992–1998: Vilafranquense

Senior career*
Years	Team	Apps	(Gls)
1998–2001	Vilafranquense	71	(0)
2001–2002	Campomaiorense	0	(0)
2002–2003	Amora	13	(0)
2003–2004	Felgueiras	33	(0)
2004–2005	Boavista	33	(0)
2006–2007	Steaua București	22	(0)
2007–2008	Boavista	9	(0)
2008	→ Foolad (loan)	3	(0)
2008–2009	Foolad	29	(0)
2009–2010	Rio Ave	28	(0)
2010–2011	Bucaspor	14	(0)
2013	Feirense	11	(0)
2013–2014	Moreirense	16	(0)
2015–2016	Caála	28	(0)
2017–2018	Vilafranquense	29	(0)
2019	Limianos	10	(0)
2019–2020	Amarante	23	(0)
2020–2021	Vilaverdense	14	(0)
2021–2022	Vitória Sernache	16	(0)
Total		402	(0)

International career
2005	Portugal B	1	(0)
2009–2012	Angola	16	(0)
- * Club domestic league appearances and goals

Carlos Alberto Fernandes (born 8 December 1979), known simply as Carlos, is a former professional footballer who played as a goalkeeper.

== Club career ==
Born in Kinshasa, Zaire, Carlos started his career as a striker, subsequently moving into goalkeeper upon replacing an injured teammate. He started playing professionally with lowly U.D. Vilafranquense, having a short stint with S.C. Campomaiorense in the Segunda Liga afterwards.

Carlos then returned to the lower leagues, with Amora FC. After a string of good performances with F.C. Felgueiras in the second division (sharing teams with Marcelo Moretto, later of S.L. Benfica), he signed with Primeira Liga's Boavista F.C. for the 2004–05 season.

At Boavista, Carlos was initially backup to veteran William Andem, but eventually won starting honours. This prompted a January 2006 move to Romania's FC Steaua București, thus becoming the first Portuguese player to have played in the country's Liga I; shortly after his arrival, he lost the confidence of fans and general manager Mihai Stoica alike, with the latter declaring at a TV show that the player, although greatly underachieving, had been put under immense pressure due to the fact of being the team's only foreigner. He was released and rejoined Boavista on 30 May 2007, having previously trained for a time with Charlton Athletic to remain fit.

In 2007–08, after losing first-choice status to Liechtensteiner Peter Jehle, Carlos was loaned to Foolad F.C. in January 2008, with the move being made permanent the following campaign – the Persian Gulf Pro League club was coached by compatriot Augusto Inácio.

After spending one year in Iran, Carlos moved back to Portugal in the summer of 2009, joining Rio Ave FC. He only missed two league games, as the Vila do Conde side retained their top-division status.

== International career ==
Through his grandmother, Carlos chose to represent Angola at international level, the first cap coming in 2009 at nearly 30 years of age. He represented his adopted nation at the following year's Africa Cup of Nations, played on home soil.

Carlos was also the starter in the 2012 Africa Cup of Nations tournament, participating in the first two games but missing the third due to yellow card accumulation, as the Palancas Negras exited in the group stage.
