= Carlos (footballer, born 1973) =

Portuguese footballer (born 1973)

Personal information
- Full name: Carlos Agostinho Moreira Martins
- Date of birth: 22 January 1973 (age 53)
- Place of birth: Freamunde, Portugal
- Position: Defender

Youth career
- Freamunde

Senior career*
Years	Team	Apps	(Gls)
1990–1997	Freamunde		
1997–1999	Leça		
1999–2002	Gil Vicente		
2002–2003	Vitória FC		
2003–2004	Maia		
2004–2006	Estrela da Amadora		
2006	→ Estoril (loan)		
2006–2007	Maia		
- * Club domestic league appearances and goals

Carlos Agostinho Moreira Martins (born 22 January 1973) is a retired Portuguese football defender.
