= Duda (footballer, born 1974) =

Brazilian footballer

Personal information
- Full name: Carlos Eduardo Ventura
- Date of birth: 15 March 1974 (age 52)
- Place of birth: São Bernardo do Campo, Brazil
- Height: 1.74 m (5 ft 9 in)
- Position: Forward

Senior career*
Years	Team	Apps	(Gls)
1997	Corinthians-AL		
1997–1998	Benfica	0	(0)
1998	Kashiwa Reysol	5	(3)
1999	Rio Ave	8	(1)
1999	Porto	1	(0)
2000	Alverca	15	(5)
2000–2004	Boavista	95	(13)
2005	Inter Limeira		
2005–2006	Corinthians-AL		
2007	Luziânia		
2008	Sliema Wanderers	6	(0)
- * Club domestic league appearances and goals

Carlos Eduardo Ventura (born 15 March 1974), known as Duda, is a Brazilian retired professional footballer who played as a forward or right winger.

He spent most of his career in Portugal, most notably with Boavista, amassing Primeira Liga totals of 119 matches and 19 goals over six seasons.

== Club career ==
Born in São Bernardo do Campo, Duda started playing organized football at Sport Club Corinthians Alagoano and, after just one season, in 1997, moved to Portugal with S.L. Benfica, but failed to feature for the latter club in official matches. After a few months in Japan and a brief stint with Rio Ave F.C. he signed with FC Porto, but was also highly unsuccessful there, finishing the 1999–2000 campaign with F.C. Alverca.

Duda had his most steady and successful period with Boavista FC, being one of the most important attacking players in a side that conquered their sole national title in 2001 (scoring ten Primeira Liga goals), alongside Martelinho and Elpídio Silva. After only 19 appearances in 2003–04, and no league goals whatsoever in his last two years, he returned to Brazil and joined Associação Atlética Internacional (Limeira), switching shortly after to his former club Corinthians Alagoano.

After a spell with Associação Atlética Luziânia, Duda moved in January 2008 to Sliema Wanderers F.C. of the Maltese Premier League. This was not his first visit to the country, as he had been to the island while a member of Boavista in a UEFA Champions League second-round qualifier against Hibernians F.C. in August 2003, which ended in a 3–3 draw, with the player himself getting on the scoresheet.

== Honours ==
Porto

- Taça de Portugal: 1999–2000

Boavista

- Primeira Liga: 2000–01
