= Ivo Afonso =

Portuguese footballer

Personal information
- Full name: Ivo Rafael Brandão Afonso
- Date of birth: 17 December 1975 (age 50)
- Place of birth: Porto, Portugal
- Height: 1.86 m (6 ft 1 in)
- Position: Centre back

Youth career
- 1988–1989: Coimbrões
- 1989–1995: Boavista

Senior career*
Years	Team	Apps	(Gls)
1995–1996	Famalicão	5	(0)
1996–1997	Arrifanense	24	(3)
1997–1999	Marco	50	(6)
1999–2000	Canelas	30	(1)
2000–2004	Gil Vicente	58	(1)
2004–2005	Naval	23	(4)
2005–2006	Moreirense	29	(1)
2006–2007	Olympiakos Nicosia	10	(0)
2007	Panetolikos	6	(0)
2008	Kalamata	13	(0)
2008	Olympiakos Nicosia	2	(0)
2008–2009	Apollon Kalamarias	4	(0)
2009–2010	Oberkorn	9	(4)
2010–2011	Steinfort		
2011–2013	US Esch-Alzette		
2013–2014	Steinfort		
Total		263	(20)
- * Club domestic league appearances and goals

Ivo Rafael Brandão Afonso (born 17 December 1975) is a Portuguese retired professional footballer who played as a central defender.

== Club career ==
Born in Porto, Afonso played four consecutive seasons in the Primeira Liga with Gil Vicente FC, where he appeared mostly as a backup (an average of 14 games per campaign).

At nearly 31 he moved abroad, representing teams in Cyprus, Greece and Luxembourg. His only spell in these countries' top flight was with Olympiakos Nicosia, in 2006–07.
