= Emanuel Braga =

Portuguese footballer (born 1975)

Emanuel
Personal information
- Full name: Emanuel Faria Braga
- Date of birth: 7 July 1975 (age 51)
- Place of birth: Vila do Conde, Portugal
- Height: 1.74 m (5 ft 9 in)
- Position: Midfielder

Youth career
- 1986–1989: Varzim
- 1989–1993: Rio Ave

Senior career*
Years	Team	Apps	(Gls)
1993–1999	Rio Ave	126	(9)
1999–2001	Boavista	27	(2)
2001	→ Rio Ave (loan)	19	(0)
2001–2002	Aves	32	(7)
2002–2003	Salgueiros	32	(3)
2003–2004	Aves	25	(6)
2004–2009	Varzim	144	(11)
2009–2010	Freamunde	29	(4)
2010–2011	Limianos	31	(2)
Total		465	(44)
- * Club domestic league appearances and goals

Emanuel Faria Braga (born 7 July 1975), known simply as Emanuel, is a Portuguese retired professional footballer who played as a midfielder.

He amassed Segunda Liga totals of 325 matches and 34 goals in 13 seasons, in service of five clubs.

== Club career ==
Born in Vila do Conde, Emanuel was part of Boavista FC's squad in the 1999–2000 season, during the Porto team's Primeira Liga and European heyday. Other than that, he represented hometown club Rio Ave FC, where he started playing football, as well as fellow northern sides C.D. Aves – two spells – S.C. Salgueiros, Varzim S.C. and S.C. Freamunde.

Emanuel's Portuguese top-division totals consisted of 109 games and eight goals over five seasons, for Rio Ave (1996 to 1999) and Boavista. The rest of his 18-year career was spent in the Segunda Liga, with the exception of the 2010–11 campaign with A.D. Os Limianos in the fourth tier.
