= Carlos Alberto (footballer, born 1974) =

Brazilian footballer

Personal information
- Full name: Carlos Alberto Ribeiro Pereira
- Date of birth: 10 October 1974 (age 52)
- Place of birth: Uberlândia, Brazil
- Height: 1.76 m (5 ft 9 in)
- Position: Defender

Youth career
- CA Juventus

Senior career*
Years	Team	Apps	(Gls)
–1996	Royale Liegeoise		
1996–1997	Waregem		
1997–1998	Campinense-PB		
1999	Campinas-SP		
1999–2000	Boavista		
2000–?	Rio Branco-MG		
–2004	Caykur Rizespor		
2004–2005	Kerkyra		
2005	Guarani		
- * Club domestic league appearances and goals

Carlos Alberto Ribeiro Pereira, commonly known as Carlos Alberto (born 10 October 1974) is a BrazilIan former professional footballer who played as a defender.
