= Jorge Couto =

Portuguese footballer (born 1970)

Personal information
- Full name: Jorge António Pinto do Couto
- Date of birth: 1 July 1970 (age 56)
- Place of birth: Argoncilhe, Portugal
- Height: 1.70 m (5 ft 7 in)
- Position: Winger

Youth career
- 1984–1985: Argoncilhe
- 1985–1986: Lusitânia
- 1986–1988: Porto

Senior career*
Years	Team	Apps	(Gls)
1988–1996	Porto	130	(11)
1988–1989	→ Gil Vicente (loan)	26	(5)
1996–2003	Boavista	157	(16)
Total		313	(32)

International career
1989	Portugal U20	4	(2)
1989–1991	Portugal U21	15	(2)
1990–1998	Portugal	6	(0)

Managerial career
- 2015–2017: Boavista (assistant)
- 2017–2019: Boavista B
- 2019: Boavista (caretaker)
- 2019–2024: Boavista (assistant)
- 2023: Boavista (caretaker)
- 2025: Boavista (caretaker)
Medal record
Men's football
Representing Portugal
FIFA U-20 World Cup
Winner	1989 Saudi Arabia
- * Club domestic league appearances and goals

Jorge António Pinto do Couto CvIH (born 1 July 1970) is a Portuguese former professional footballer who played as a right winger.

He amassed Primeira Liga totals of 287 matches and 27 goals over 14 seasons, representing in the competition Porto and Boavista and winning 13 major titles between both clubs.

From 2015, Couto worked as a coach in different roles at Boavista.

== Club career ==
Couto was born in Argoncilhe, Santa Maria da Feira. During his career he played professionally for Porto, Gil Vicente (on loan from his alma mater) and Boavista. With the first club he was used regularly in his early years, mainly from the bench but was a fringe player subsequently.

With Boavista from 1996 until his retirement, Couto had his best years, helping to the side's Primeira Liga and European consolidation although he was already slowing down as they won their only first division title in 2001, being barred by younger Martelinho but still contributing 17 matches and three goals to the feat.

== International career ==
Couto scored one of the two goals for the Portugal under-20 team in the 2–0 final win against Nigeria, as the nation won the first of its two consecutive FIFA U-20 World Cups.

He won six caps at full international level, mostly while at Porto, the first arriving at age 20. He was not related to club and national teammate Fernando Couto.

== Coaching career ==
In July 2015, Couto returned to Boavista as assistant to former teammate and new coach Petit. Two years later, he was put in charge of the Estádio do Bessa club's new reserve team.

Couto became caretaker manager of the main squad on 26 January 2019 after the dismissal of Jorge Simão. In his one game three days later, they lost 5–1 at Benfica before Lito Vidigal was installed.

Having already been suspended for ten days and fined €1,913 by the Portuguese Football Federation in October 2016 for insulting the refereeing team, Couto was suspended for 15 days and fined €3,507 in April 2021 by the same body for the same offence. In December 2023, he went back into interim charge after Petit's resignation, and drew 1–1 on his debut at home to Vitória de Guimarães; following Ricardo Paiva's appointment later that month, he returned to assistant duties.

Couto was again briefly in charge of Boavista as an interim in the 2024–25 season, taking over from Vidigal at the bottom-placed side.

== Honours ==
Porto

- Primeira Liga: 1989–90, 1991–92, 1992–93, 1994–95, 1995–96
- Taça de Portugal: 1990–91, 1993–94
- Supertaça Cândido de Oliveira: 1990, 1991, 1993

Boavista

- Primeira Liga: 2000–01
- Taça de Portugal: 1996–97
- Supertaça Cândido de Oliveira: 1997

Portugal

- FIFA U-20 World Cup: 1989
