= Litos (footballer, born February 1974) =

Portuguese footballer

Personal information
- Full name: Carlos Manuel de Oliveira Magalhães
- Date of birth: 25 February 1974 (age 52)
- Place of birth: Porto, Portugal
- Height: 1.84 m (6 ft 0 in)
- Position: Centre-back

Youth career
- 1985–1986: Lapa
- 1986–1987: Real Campo Lindo
- 1987–1992: Boavista

Senior career*
Years	Team	Apps	(Gls)
1992–2001	Boavista	183	(19)
1992–1993	→ Campomaiorense (loan)	29	(0)
1993–1994	→ Estoril (loan)	16	(0)
1994–1995	→ Rio Ave (loan)	31	(3)
2001–2006	Málaga	89	(6)
2006–2007	Académica	27	(2)
2008	SV Salzburg	0	(0)
Total		375	(32)

International career
1993–1996	Portugal U21	14	(2)
1999–2001	Portugal	6	(0)
- * Club domestic league appearances and goals

Carlos Manuel de Oliveira Magalhães (born 25 February 1974), known as Litos, is a Portuguese former professional footballer who played as a central defender.

He appeared in 226 Primeira Liga matches (21 goals) over nine seasons, mainly for Boavista with whom he won the 2000–01 national championship. He also spent several years in La Liga with Málaga.

== Club career ==
Born in Porto, Litos started playing football with Boavista. Following loan spells at Campomaiorense, Estoril and Rio Ave, he rejoined his parent club, being instrumental in their only Primeira Liga title in history in 2000–01, as captain; he formed a formidable stopper duo with Pedro Emanuel, who would then move to Porto.

After Boavista's conquest, Litos signed for La Liga side Málaga, experiencing different fortunes during his spell in Andalusia – two seasons as an undisputed starter, a total of 20 games in the other three. In 2005–06 his team was relegated, with the player only making eight league appearances; for five years, he partnered compatriots Edgar and Duda.

Litos joined Académica de Coimbra for 2006–07. After being first choice in his first year he was deemed surplus to requirements in the following, leaving and moving to Austrian Football Bundesliga's SV Salzburg in January 2008; he retired at the end of that campaign, with no competitive matches to his credit.

== International career ==
Litos earned six caps for Portugal, the first arriving on 10 February 1999 as he played three minutes in a 0–0 friendly draw against the Netherlands in Paris. He also represented the nation at the 1996 Summer Olympics.

== Honours ==
Boavista

- Primeira Liga: 2000–01
- Taça de Portugal: 1996–97
- Supertaça Cândido de Oliveira: 1997

Málaga

- UEFA Intertoto Cup: 2002
