= Demétrius Montanini =

Brazilian footballer (born 1971)

Personal information
- Date of birth: 18 March 1971 (age 55)
- Place of birth: São Paulo, Brazil
- Height: 1.77 m (5 ft 10 in)
- Position: Striker

Senior career*
Years	Team	Apps	(Gls)
1991–1993	Botafogo		
1994–1995	Santos	5	(0)
1995	Remo		
1996	Fluminense	3	(1)
1997	Portuguesa Santista		
1997	Bahia	6	(1)
1997–2000	Campomaiorense	54	(23)
2000–2001	Boavista	18	(5)
2001–2002	Beira-Mar	25	(5)
2002–2005	Moreirense	59	(14)
2005	Comercial		
2006	Mineiros		(–)
- * Club domestic league appearances and goals

Demétrius Montanini (born 18 March 1971), sometimes known as just Demétrius, is a Brazilian former professional footballer who played as a striker.

He was part of the Campomaiorense side who reached the final of the 1998–99 Taça de Portugal.

== Honours ==
Remo

- Campeonato Paraense: 1995

Campomaiorense

- Taça de Portugal runner-up: 1998–99

Boavista

- Primeira Liga: 2000–01
