= Paulo Sérgio (footballer, born 1972) =

Brazilian footballer

Personal information
- Full name: Paulo Sérgio da Silva
- Date of birth: 2 December 1972 (age 53)
- Place of birth: Ubiratã, Brazil
- Height: 1.81 m (5 ft 11 1/2 in)
- Positions: Defender; midfielder

Senior career*
Years	Team	Apps	(Gls)
1993–1998	Coritiba		
1998–2003	Marítimo	74	(3)
2003–2004	Nacional	9	(1)
2004	Belenenses	7	(0)
2004–2006	Olhanense	50	(3)
2006–2007	Camacha	24	(0)
- * Club domestic league appearances and goals

Paulo Sérgio da Silva, known as Paulo Sérgio (born 2 December 1972) is a former Brazilian football player.

== Club career ==
He played 5 seasons and 90 games in the Primeira Liga for Marítimo, Nacional and Belenenses.
