= Bruno Paixão =

Portuguese football referee

Bruno Miguel Duarte Paixão (born 28 May 1974, in Setúbal) is a Portuguese football referee. He has been a FIFA international referee since 2004.
