= Erivan (footballer) =

Brazilian footballer (born 1975)

Personal information
- Full name: Erivan Nascimento de Lima
- Date of birth: 21 May 1975 (age 51)
- Place of birth: São Caetano, Brazil
- Height: 1.77 m (5 ft 9 1/2 in)
- Position: Defender

Senior career*
Years	Team	Apps	(Gls)
1995	Central		
1996	Campinas		
1997	São Domingos		
1998–1999	Surubim		
1999	Freamunde	14	(0)
2000–2003	Boavista	69	(1)
2003–2004	Maia	21	(1)
2004–2005	Varzim	22	(0)
2005	Surubim		
2006–2008	Rio Preto		
- * Club domestic league appearances and goals

Erivan Nascimento de Lima, known as Erivan (born 21 May 1975) is a Brazilian former footballer who played as a defender.

== Club career ==
He played 4 seasons and 69 games in the Primeira Liga for Boavista.

== Honours ==
Boavista

- Primeira Liga: 2000–01
