= William Quevedo =

French footballer (born 1971)

Personal information
- Date of birth: 8 May 1971 (age 55)
- Place of birth: Montpellier, France
- Height: 1.75 m (5 ft 9 in)
- Positions: Defender; midfielder

Senior career*
Years	Team	Apps	(Gls)
1993–1995	Rodez	64	(15)
1995–1996	Valence	26	(3)
1996–1997	Moreirense	28	(7)
1997–2001	Boavista	69	(4)
2001–2003	Sochaux	13	(0)
2003–2005	Sète 34	36	(2)
2005–2006	Rodez	12	(0)
- * Club domestic league appearances and goals

William Quevedo (born 8 May 1971) is a former French football player.

== Club career ==
He played 5 seasons and 69 games in the Primeira Liga for Boavista.

== Honours ==
Boavista

- Primeira Liga: 2000–01
- Supertaça Cândido de Oliveira: 1997
