= Nuno Frechaut =

Portuguese footballer (born 1977)

Personal information
- Full name: Nuno Miguel Frechaut Barreto
- Date of birth: 24 September 1977 (age 49)
- Place of birth: Lisbon, Portugal
- Height: 1.84 m (6 ft 0 in)
- Positions: Defender; midfielder

Youth career
- 1987–1996: Vitória Setúbal

Senior career*
| Years | Team | Apps | (Gls) |
| 1996–2000 | Vitória Setúbal | 74 | (2) |
| 2000–2004 | Boavista | 84 | (5) |
| 2005 | Dynamo Moscow | 15 | (1) |
| 2006–2009 | Braga | 75 | (4) |
| 2009–2011 | Metz | 39 | (0) |
| 2011–2012 | Naval | 8 | (0) |
| 2012–2014 | Boavista | 19 | (2) |
| Total | | 314 | (14) |

International career
| 1998 | Portugal U20 | 1 | (0) |
| 1997–1999 | Portugal U21 | 8 | (0) |
| 2001 | Portugal B | 2 | (0) |
| 2004 | Portugal Olympic (O.P.) | 4 | (0) |
| 2001–2005 | Portugal | 17 | (0) |
- * Club domestic league appearances and goals

Nuno Miguel Frechaut Barreto (born 24 September 1977), known as Frechaut (Portuguese pronunciation: [fɾɛˈʃo]), is a Portuguese former professional footballer. A defender or midfielder, he could occupy a variety of positions.

He amassed Primeira Liga totals of 233 matches and 11 goals over the course of 13 seasons, representing in the competition Vitória de Setúbal, Boavista and Braga.

Frechaut appeared for Portugal at the 2002 World Cup.

== Club career ==
Born in Lisbon, Frechaut emerged through Vitória de Setúbal's youth academy, making his first-team – and Primeira Liga – debut in the 1996–97 season at the age of 19. He went on to represent Boavista until December 2004, winning the national championship for the latter in 2001 whilst appearing mainly as right-back.

Following a failed Russian experience with Dynamo Moscow, Frechaut joined Braga in January 2006. In late August 2009, after three further full campaigns of regular use (an average of 22 games, with two UEFA Cup qualifications), he left the Minho club and Portugal, agreeing to a three-year contract at French Ligue 2 side Metz.

In August 2012, after appearing rarely for Naval 1º de Maio in the Segunda Liga, 35-year-old Frechaut returned to Boavista, reuniting with his former teammate Petit at the third tier team.

== International career ==
Frechaut won 17 caps for Portugal, still as a Boavista player. The first came on 2 June 2001 in a 1–1 away draw against the Republic of Ireland for the 2002 FIFA World Cup qualifiers.

Frechaut was part of the nation's squads at both the 2002 World Cup – where he played and started in their only win in the competition, 4–0 over Poland– and the 2004 Summer Olympics.
