= Whelliton =

Brazilian footballer

Personal information
- Full name: Whelliton Augusto Silva
- Date of birth: 23 July 1972 (age 54)
- Place of birth: Santos, Brazil
- Height: 1.85 m (6 ft 1 in)
- Position: Forward

Senior career*
Years	Team	Apps	(Gls)
1993–1996	Santos		
1996–1997	Vila Nova		
1997	Anápolis		
1998–1999	Corinthians-AL		
1999–2001	Boavista	51	(18)
2001–2003	Córdoba	47	(8)
2003–2004	Beira-Mar	21	(0)
2004	Flamengo	19	(3)
2005	Portuguesa		
2006	CRB		
- * Club domestic league appearances and goals

Whelliton Augusto Silva, known as Whelliton (born 23 July 1972) is a Brazilian former professional footballer.

== Honours ==
Boavista

- Primeira Liga: 2000–01
