= Mário Loja =

Portuguese footballer

Personal information
- Full name: Mário Jorge Amora Loja
- Date of birth: 27 December 1977 (age 48)
- Place of birth: Setúbal, Portugal
- Height: 1.80 m (5 ft 11 in)
- Position: Defender

Youth career
- 1986–1988: Pelezinhos
- 1989–1996: Vitória Setúbal

Senior career*
Years	Team	Apps	(Gls)
1996–2001	Vitória Setúbal	95	(0)
2001–2004	Boavista	59	(0)
2004–2005	Beira-Mar	20	(0)
2005–2009	Créteil	123	(1)
2009–2010	Arouca	29	(1)
2010–2011	Boavista	24	(3)
2012	Estrela Vendas Novas	15	(2)
2012–2013	Alcochetense	4	(0)
2013–2017	Fabril	65	(3)
2017–2019	Comércio Indústria		
Total		434	(10)

International career
1995	Portugal U17	4	(0)
1995–1996	Portugal U18	13	(0)
1997	Portugal U20	2	(0)
1999	Portugal U21	5	(0)
- * Club domestic league appearances and goals

Mário Jorge Amora Loja (born 27 December 1977) is a Portuguese former professional footballer who played as a left back or a central defender.

== Club career ==
Born in Setúbal, Loja joined local club Vitória FC's youth system in 1989, aged 11. From 1996 to 2005, save for one season, he competed in the Primeira Liga, also representing Boavista F.C. and S.C. Beira-Mar and appearing in a total of 152 matches.

Loja moved abroad in the summer of 2005, signing with US Créteil-Lusitanos and spending his first two years in the French Ligue 2. Subsequently, he returned to his homeland, where he played lower league or amateur football until his retirement.
