= Jorge Silva (footballer, born 1975) =

Portuguese footballer

Personal information
- Full name: Luís Jorge Pinto da Silva
- Date of birth: 4 December 1975 (age 50)
- Place of birth: Porto, Portugal
- Height: 1.82 m (6 ft 0 in)
- Position: Defensive midfielder

Youth career
- 1987–1989: Ermesinde
- 1989–1994: Boavista

Senior career*
Years	Team	Apps	(Gls)
1994–2004	Boavista	103	(1)
1995–1997	→ Académica (loan)	59	(2)
1997–1998	→ União Leiria (loan)	30	(4)
2005–2007	Beira-Mar	52	(1)
2007–2008	Feirense	29	(0)
2008–2010	Boavista	43	(0)
2010–2011	Gondomar	18	(0)
Total		334	(8)

International career
1995–1996	Portugal U20	9	(1)
1996	Portugal U21	1	(0)
2002	Portugal B	1	(0)
2002	Portugal	2	(0)

Managerial career
- 2011: Paços Ferreira (assistant)
- 2015: Nogueirense
- 2016–2017: Valadares Gaia
Medal record
Men's football
Representing Portugal
FIFA U-20 World Cup
Third place	1995 Qatar
- * Club domestic league appearances and goals

Luís Jorge Pinto da Silva (born 4 December 1975) is a Portuguese former professional footballer who played mainly as a defensive midfielder.

He amassed Primeira Liga totals of 127 matches and one goal over nine seasons, mainly in representation of Boavista for whom he also appeared at other levels.

== Club career ==
Silva was born in Porto. Having emerged from local Boavista FC's youth ranks he was promoted to the first team in 1994, but took time to establish himself in the early years, serving two loans until 1998 (Académica de Coimbra and U.D. Leiria, both in the Segunda Liga).

Silva returned to Boavista subsequently, and went on to be a relatively important part in the club's historical Primeira Liga conquest in 2000–01, assuming defensive duties in midfield with Petit. He featured heavily as the Axadrezados progressed to the following season's UEFA Champions League second group stage, adding a semi-final run in the UEFA Cup the next year.

Starting in January 2005, Silva then played two and a half years at S.C. Beira-Mar, being relegated from the top flight in his last, after which he moved to C.D. Feirense also in the second division. In 2008, he returned to Boavista as the last survivor of the league-winning squad, as the club was in severe financial crisis in division two, ultimately being relegated for the second consecutive time.

In summer 2010, aged 34, Silva signed with another northern team, Gondomar S.C. of the third tier. He retired in June of the following year, beginning a coaching career immediately as he was appointed assistant manager at F.C. Paços de Ferreira.

== International career ==
In 2002, the year after Boavista's league conquest, Silva collected two caps for Portugal. He made his debut on 7 September, coming on as a late substitute in a 1–1 friendly draw against England at Villa Park.

== Personal life ==
Silva's sons, Fábio and Jorge, are also professional footballers. Both were developed at Porto.

== Honours ==
Boavista

- Primeira Liga: 2000–01

Beira-Mar

- Segunda Liga: 2005–06
