= Rui Óscar =

Portuguese footballer

Personal information
- Full name: Rui Óscar Neves de Sousa Viana
- Date of birth: 17 December 1975 (age 50)
- Place of birth: Gondomar, Portugal
- Height: 1.68 m (5 ft 6 in)
- Position: Defender

Youth career
- 1987–1994: Porto

Senior career*
Years	Team	Apps	(Gls)
1994–1995	U. Lamas	17	(1)
1995–1996	Leça	27	(0)
1996–1997	Porto	1	(0)
1997–2000	Marítimo	85	(2)
2000–2004	Boavista	71	(1)
2004–2005	Beira-Mar	3	(0)

International career
1994	Portugal U-18	6	(2)
1995–1996	Portugal U-20	14	(0)
1995–1996	Portugal U-21	8	(0)
2000	Portugal B	1	(0)
Medal record
Men's football
Representing Portugal
FIFA U-20 World Cup
Third place	1995 Qatar
- * Club domestic league appearances and goals

Rui Óscar Neves de Sousa Viana, known as Rui Óscar (born 17 December 1975) is a former Portuguese football player.

He played 10 seasons and 187 games in the Primeira Liga for Marítimo, Boavista, Leça, Beira-Mar and Porto.

== Club career ==
He made his Primeira Liga debut for Leça on 20 August 1995 in a game against Gil Vicente.

== Honours ==
=== Club ===
Boavista

- Primeira Liga: 2000–01

=== International ===
Portugal Under-18

- UEFA European Under-18 Championship: 1994
