= Pedro Santos (footballer, born 1976) =

Portuguese footballer

Personal information
- Full name: Pedro Jorge Santos dos Santos
- Date of birth: 28 June 1976 (age 50)
- Place of birth: Caracas, Venezuela
- Height: 1.69 m (5 ft 6 1/2 in)
- Position: Midfielder

Youth career
- 1988–1994: Dragões Sandinenses

Senior career*
Years	Team	Apps	(Gls)
1994–1995	Dragões Sandinenses	16	(3)
1995–1998	Feirense	92	(13)
1998–2000	Gil Vicente	53	(7)
2000–2005	Boavista	60	(4)
2004–2005	→ Penafiel (loan)	0	(0)
2005–2007	Naval	27	(0)
2007–2008	Beira-Mar	4	(0)
2008–2011	Arouca	35	(5)
Total		287	(32)
- * Club domestic league appearances and goals

Pedro Jorge Santos dos Santos (born 28 June 1976 in Caracas, Venezuela) is a Portuguese former professional footballer who played as a central midfielder.

== Honours ==
Gil Vicente

- Segunda Liga: 1998–99

Boavista

- Primeira Liga: 2000–01
