= William Andem =

Cameroonian footballer (born 1968)

Personal information
- Full name: Bassey William Andem
- Date of birth: 14 June 1968 (age 58)
- Place of birth: Douala, Cameroon
- Height: 1.86 m (6 ft 1 in)
- Position: Goalkeeper

Senior career*
Years	Team	Apps	(Gls)
1989–1993	Union Douala		
1992	→ Olympic Mvolyé (loan)		
1994–1996	Cruzeiro	9	(0)
1997–1998	Bahia	19	(0)
1998–2007	Boavista	152	(0)
2007–2008	Feirense	3	(0)

International career
1989–1998	Cameroon	31	(0)
- * Club domestic league appearances and goals

Bassey William Andem (born 14 June 1968) is a Cameroonian former professional footballer who played as a goalkeeper.

He spent most of his career in Portuguese-speaking countries, mainly at the service of Boavista.

Andem won 31 caps for the Cameroon national team in nine years, being part of the squad at the 1998 World Cup.

== Club career ==
Andem was born in Douala. After starting his professional career with his hometown club Union Douala (which included a loan spell at Olympic Mvolyé) he moved to Brazil, where he represented Cruzeiro EC and Esporte Clube Bahia.

In January 1998, Andem joined Portuguese Primeira Liga side Boavista FC, where he engaged in an interesting battle for first-choice status with future Sporting CP player and Portugal international Ricardo. However, as the Chequereds won the 2001 national championship – their only – he appeared in just seven matches.

After Ricardo left for Lisbon, Andem was restored as starter, losing the position midway through the 2004–05 campaign to new signing Carlos. He would regain his previous status after the Angolan was sold to FC Steaua București, totalling a further 43 league appearances in two seasons.

Andem played his last season as a professional in 2007–08, with Segunda Liga team C.D. Feirense, where he was second-fiddle. He retired at the age of 40, later working in directorial capacities at Union Douala.

== International career ==
Barred mainly by Jacques Songo'o, Andem featured irregularly for Cameroon over eight years. He was selected as backup for the 1998 FIFA World Cup, also making the squad in three Africa Cup of Nations tournaments.
