= Martelinho =

Portuguese football manager and former player

Personal information
- Full name: Joaquim Pereira da Silva
- Date of birth: 19 November 1974 (age 51)
- Place of birth: São Paio de Oleiros, Portugal
- Height: 1.75 m (5 ft 9 in)
- Position: Winger

Youth career
- 1987–1991: Feirense
- 1991–1993: Boavista

Senior career*
Years	Team	Apps	(Gls)
1993–2005	Boavista	189	(23)
1993–1994	→ Marco (loan)	32	(4)
1995–1996	→ Aves (loan)	33	(6)
2005–2006	Portonovo	14	(0)
2006–2007	Penafiel	9	(0)
2007–2008	Portonovo		
2008–2013	Futsal		
Total		277	(33)

Managerial career
- 2008–2011: Feirense (youth)
- 2011–2012: Boavista (youth)
- 2012–2014: Lusitânia Lourosa
- 2014–2016: Cesarense
- 2016–2017: Lusitânia Lourosa
- * Club domestic league appearances and goals

Joaquim Pereira da Silva (born 19 November 1974), known as Martelinho, is a Portuguese former professional footballer who played as a right winger.

He played ten full Primeira Liga seasons during his 14-year senior career, all with Boavista, where he contributed to their one league title in 2000–01. After retiring, he worked as a manager.

== Club career ==
Martelinho was born in São Paio de Oleiros, Santa Maria da Feira. He represented F.C. Marco, Boavista FC, C.D. Aves, Portonovo SD (Spain, amateurs) and F.C. Penafiel, being instrumental in Boavista's only Primeira Liga conquest in the club's history in the 2000–01 season, where in addition to scoring four goals in 30 matches he provided several assists to Brazilian forward Elpídio Silva; on 13 January 2001, he scored the only goal of the derby win over FC Porto at the Estádio do Bessa, as his team leapfrogged their neighbours to pole position.

In the summer of 2009, Martelinho returned to his very first youth club C.D. Feirense, managing its junior sides; he had already returned to active the previous year but in futsal, playing with FC Cidade de Lourosa, and accumulated both activities in the following years. He also managed Lusitânia F.C. and F.C. Cesarense in the third division, having two spells with the former and winning the Aveiro Football Association's District League in 2013.

== Personal life ==
Martelinho's son, Diogo, who inherited his moniker, played as a midfielder but no higher than district level.
