= Elpídio Silva =

Brazilian footballer (born 1975)

Personal information
- Full name: Elpídio Pereira da Silva Filho
- Date of birth: 19 July 1975 (age 51)
- Place of birth: Campina Grande, Brazil
- Height: 1.80 m (5 ft 11 in)
- Position: Striker

Youth career
- Atlético Mineiro

Senior career*
Years	Team	Apps	(Gls)
1995–1997	Atlético Mineiro		
1997–1998	Kashiwa Reysol	22	(10)
1998–2000	Braga	57	(21)
2000–2003	Boavista	78	(28)
2003–2006	Sporting CP	29	(6)
2004–2005	→ Vitória Guimarães (loan)	23	(7)
2006	Derby County	0	(0)
2006	Corinthians-AL		
2007	Suwon Bluewings	11	(1)
2007–2008	Alki Larnaca	37	(13)
2009	AEK Larnaca	6	(1)
Total		263	(87)
- * Club domestic league appearances and goals

Elpídio Pereira da Silva Filho (born 19 July 1975), known as Silva, is a Brazilian former professional footballer who played as a striker.

He spent most of his career in Portugal, mainly representing Boavista and amassing Primeira Liga totals of 187 matches and 62 goals over eight seasons. Other than in his country, he also competed in Japan, South Korea and Cyprus.

== Career ==
Born in Campina Grande, Paraíba, Silva started his professional career with Atlético Mineiro but quickly moved overseas, joining J1 League club Kashiwa Reysol. After just one season, he signed for Portugal's Braga, where he remained until June 2000.

Silva's most productive period, however, was lived with fellow Primeira Liga side Boavista. There, he was instrumental in winning the 2001 national championship (their only) by scoring 11 goals, one coming in the decisive 3–0 home victory against Aves in the last round.

In the subsequent edition of the UEFA Champions League, Silva scored in a 1–1 draw at Liverpool, also finding the net in the second match between the two teams, with the same result. In Boavista's UEFA Cup semi-final run the following campaign, he labelled Celtic a "one-man team" prior to the sides' meeting in the competition's semi-finals; the Scots won 2–1 on aggregate, with Henrik Larsson – the "one man" of Silva's tirade – scoring the decisive goal in Porto.

A move to Sporting CP ensued but, barred by newly signed compatriot Liédson, Silva received few opportunities to shine. He did score six times in the league in his debut season, also being loaned to Vitória de Guimarães in between.

Released by the Lisbon club in January 2006, Silva subsequently represented Derby County, where he did not appear due to fitness problems, Corinthians Alagoano, Suwon Samsung Bluewings and Alki Larnaca. In January 2009, he moved to AEK Larnaca also in the Cypriot First Division.

== Career statistics ==
Appearances and goals by club, season and competition
Club	Season	League		
Club	Season	Division	Apps	Goals
Atlético Mineiro	1997	Série A		
Kashiwa Reysol	1997	J1 League	12	8
Kashiwa Reysol	1998	J1 League	10	2
Kashiwa Reysol	Total		22	10
Braga	1998–99	Primeira Liga	32	16
Braga	1999–2000	Primeira Liga	25	5
Braga	Total		57	21
Boavista	2000–01	Primeira Liga	21	11
Boavista	2001–02	Primeira Liga	27	7
Boavista	2002–03	Primeira Liga	30	10
Boavista	Total		78	28
Sporting CP	2003–04	Primeira Liga	28	6
Sporting CP	2005–06	Primeira Liga	1	0
Sporting CP	Total		29	6
Vitória Guimarães (loan)	2004–05	Primeira Liga	23	7
Derby County	2005–06	Championship	0	0
Corinthians-AL	2006			
Suwon Samsung Bluewings	2006	K-League	11	1
Career total			220	73
