= 2001–02 Juventus FC season =

Italian football club season

Juventus
2001–02 season
- President: Vittorio Chiusano
- Manager: Marcello Lippi
- Stadium: Stadio delle Alpi
- Serie A: 1st
- Coppa Italia: Runners-up
- UEFA Champions League: Second group stage
- Top goalscorer: League: David Trezeguet (24); All: David Trezeguet (32)
- Average home league attendance: 40,687
Home colours	Away colours

The 2001–02 season was Juventus's 104th in existence and 100th consecutive season in the top flight of Italian football. Juventus ended a three-year drought of league titles, following a remarkable turnaround in fortunes during the final days of the season, when Inter suffered from a collapse of nerves in the closing stages. On the final day of the league season, Juventus won 2–0 away from home against Udinese, while Inter fell at Lazio 4–2, despite leading twice. That handed Juventus its 26th Serie A title, and made up for the disappointing exit from the second group stage in the UEFA Champions League. Juventus also reached the 2002 Coppa Italia final, but were defeated by Parma on away goals following a 2–2 draw on aggregate.

As for individual players, the season saw new goalkeeper Gianluigi Buffon claiming a stature as the best keeper in the world, while David Trezeguet got his Serie A breakthrough, sharing the topscoring title with Dario Hübner of Piacenza. Alessandro Del Piero also played a crucial part in the success, scoring 16 goals.

Apart from Buffon, pre-season saw three significant signings. Lilian Thuram came from Parma along with Buffon, but failed to establish himself as centre-back and ended up on the right wing-back position. Pavel Nedvěd came from Lazio as a replacement for departed Zinedine Zidane after Pavel Nedvěd snubbed Manchester United, and performed at an acceptable level, without finding the form he had shown a few years before. Fellow Lazio signing Marcelo Salas was however a major flop, because of a serious cruciate ligament injury he suffered during a scoreless draw at Bologna, which kept him away for almost the entire season; a technically gifted, prolific goalscorer in his prime, Salas was subsequently plagued by injuries and his career was never the same again.

The sale of Zinedine Zidane to Real Madrid of Spain from Juventus, was the world football transfer record at the time, costing the Spanish club €77.5 million. The intake of Gianluigi Buffon from Parma cost Juventus €45 million, making it the most expensive transfer for a goalkeeper of all time.

== Players ==
=== Squad information ===
Note: Flags indicate national team as defined under FIFA eligibility rules; some limited exceptions apply. Players may hold more than one non-FIFA nationality.

No.	Pos.	Nation	Player
1	GK	ITA	Gianluigi Buffon
2	DF	ITA	Ciro Ferrara
3	DF	ITA	Michele Paramatti
4	DF	URU	Paolo Montero
5	DF	CRO	Igor Tudor
7	DF	ITA	Gianluca Pessotto
8	MF	ITA	Antonio Conte
9	FW	CHI	Marcelo Salas
10	FW	ITA	Alessandro Del Piero (Captain)
11	MF	CZE	Pavel Nedvěd
12	GK	ITA	Michelangelo Rampulla
13	DF	ITA	Mark Iuliano
14	MF	ITA	Cristian Zenoni
15	DF	ITA	Alessandro Birindelli

No.	Pos.	Nation	Player
16	MF	ITA	Enzo Maresca
17	FW	FRA	David Trezeguet
19	DF	ITA	Gianluca Zambrotta
20	MF	ITA	Alessio Tacchinardi
21	DF	FRA	Lilian Thuram
22	GK	URU	Fabián Carini
25	FW	URU	Marcelo Zalayeta
26	MF	NED	Edgar Davids
27	FW	ITA	Nicola Amoruso
30	MF	ITA	Alessandro Frara
33	FW	FRA	Vincent Péricard
36	MF	UZB	Ilyos Zeytulayev
38	FW	PAR	Tomás Guzmán

=== Transfers ===
In
Pos.	Name	from	Type
GK	Gianluigi Buffon	Parma	
DF	Lilian Thuram	Parma	
DF	Cristian Zenoni	A.C. Milan	
MF	Pavel Nedvěd	Lazio	
MF	Enzo Maresca	Bologna	loan ended
MF	Marco Rigoni	Ravenna	loan ended
FW	Marcelo Salas	Lazio	
FW	Nicola Amoruso	Napoli	loan ended
GK	Landry Bonnefoi	Cannes	
FW	Marcelo Zalayeta	Sevilla	loan ended

Out
Pos.	Name	To	Type
MF	Zinedine Zidane	Real Madrid	€77.5 million
FW	Filippo Inzaghi	A.C. Milan	
GK	Edwin van der Sar	Fulham	
FW	Daniel Fonseca	River Plate	
GK	Andreas Isaksson	Djurgårdens	
FW	Darko Kovačević	Lazio	
MF	Matteo Brighi	Bologna	loan
FW	Juan Esnaider	Porto	

=== Left club during season ===
Note: Flags indicate national team as defined under FIFA eligibility rules; some limited exceptions apply. Players may hold more than one non-FIFA nationality.

No. / Pos. / Nation / Player; 6 / MF / URU / Fabián O'Neill (to Perugia)	No. / Pos. / Nation / Player; 28 / MF / BRA / Athirson (on loan to Flamengo)

=== Reserve squad ===
Note: Flags indicate national team as defined under FIFA eligibility rules; some limited exceptions apply. Players may hold more than one non-FIFA nationality.

No.	Pos.	Nation	Player
23	MF	ITA	Marco Rigoni
29	FW	ITA	Stefano Romano
31	DF	ITA	Felice Piccolo
32	MF	ITA	Stefano Rondinella
34	GK	FRA	Landry Bonnefoi

No.	Pos.	Nation	Player
35	DF	ITA	Mattia Cassani
37	MF	RUS	Viktor Budyanskiy
39	DF	ITA	Francesco Scardina
40	GK	ITA	Antonio Mirante
41	DF	ITA	Domenico Maietta

== Competitions ==
=== Serie A ===
==== League table ====
Pos	Team	Pld	W	D	L	GF	GA	GD	Pts	Qualification or relegation
1	Juventus (C)	34	20	11	3	64	23	+41	71	Qualification to Champions League first group stage
2	Roma	34	19	13	2	58	24	+34	70	Qualification to Champions League first group stage
3	Internazionale	34	20	9	5	62	35	+27	69	Qualification to Champions League third qualifying round
4	AC Milan	34	14	13	7	47	33	+14	55	Qualification to Champions League third qualifying round
5	Chievo	34	14	12	8	57	52	+5	54	Qualification to UEFA Cup first round

Source: Lega serie A
Rules for classification: 1) points; 2) goal difference; 3) number of goals scored.
(C) Champions

==== Results summary ====
Overall								Home						Away					
Pld	W	D	L	GF	GA	GD	Pts	W	D	L	GF	GA	GD	W	D	L	GF	GA	GD
34	20	11	3	64	23	+41	71	13	3	1	38	11	+27	7	8	2	26	12	+14

Source: Competitive matches

==== Results by round ====
Round	1	2	3	4	5	6	7	8	9	10	11	12	13	14	15	16	17	18	19	20	21	22	23	24	25	26	27	28	29	30	31	32	33	34
Ground	H	A	H	A	H	H	A	H	A	H	A	H	A	H	A	A	H	A	H	A	H	A	H	A	H	A	H	A	H	A	H	A	H	A
Result	W	W	W	D	L	D	D	D	D	W	L	W	D	W	D	W	W	W	W	W	W	D	W	D	W	D	W	L	D	W	W	W	W	W
Position	1	1	1	1	3	4	5	6	6	3	6	5	6	4	4	4	4	4	3	3	2	2	1	3	2	3	3	3	3	3	3	2	2	1

Source: Competitive matches
A = Away; H = Home; W = Win; D = Draw; L = Loss; = Leader, 2002–03 UEFA Champions League Group stage; = 2002–03 UEFA Champions League Group stage; = 2002–03 UEFA Champions League Second qualifying round; = 2002–03 UEFA Champions League Second qualifying round; = 2002–03 UEFA Cup First round

==== Matches ====
26 August 2001 1	Juventus	4–0	Venezia	Turin
15:00 CEST (UTC+02:00)	Trezeguet 10', 11'; Del Piero 44', 81'	Report		Stadium: Stadio delle Alpi; Attendance: 35,817; Referee: Paolo Bertini

2 September 2001 2	Atalanta	0–2	Juventus	Bergamo
15:00 CEST (UTC+02:00)		Report	Del Piero 8'; Trezeguet 83'	Stadium: Stadio Atleti Azzurri d'Italia; Attendance: 24,386; Referee: Gennaro Borriello

15 September 2001 3	Juventus	3–2	Chievo	Turin
20:30 CEST (UTC+02:00)	Tacchinardi 22'; Tudor 40'; Salas 83' (pen.)	Report	Marazzina 9', 20'	Stadium: Stadio delle Alpi; Attendance: 40,555; Referee: Cosimo Bolognino

22 September 2001 4	Lecce	0–0	Juventus	Lecce
20:30 CEST (UTC+02:00)	Savino (red card) 90'	Report	Montero (red card) 90'	Stadium: Stadio Via del Mare; Attendance: 32,236; Referee: Massimo De Santis

29 September 2001 5	Juventus	0–2	Roma	Turin
20:30 CEST (UTC+02:00)		Report	Batistuta 37', (yellow card) -' (red card) 75'; Assunção 90+3'	Stadium: Stadio delle Alpi; Attendance: 49,454; Referee: Graziano Cesari

7 October 2001 7	Juventus	3–3	Torino	Turin
15:00 CEST (UTC+02:00)	Del Piero 9', 25'; Tudor 12'	Report	Lucarelli 57'; Ferrante 70' (pen.); Maspero 83'	Stadium: Stadio delle Alpi; Attendance: 29,239; Referee: Gennaro Borriello

20 October 2001 8	Bologna	0–0	Juventus	Bologna
20:30 CEST (UTC+02:00)		Report		Stadium: Stadio Renato Dall'Ara; Attendance: 35,756; Referee: Gianluca Paparesta

27 October 2001 9	Juventus	0–0	Internazionale	Turin
20:30 CEST (UTC+02:00)		Report		Stadium: Stadio delle Alpi; Attendance: 53,661; Referee: Stefano Braschi

3 November 2001 10	Hellas Verona	2–2	Juventus	Verona
15:00 CET (UTC+01:00)	Colucci 10'; Camoranesi 67'	Report	Tudor 78'; Trezeguet 90+2'	Stadium: Stadio Marc'Antonio Bentegodi; Attendance: 26,574; Referee: Graziano Cesari

11 November 2001 11	Juventus	3–1	Parma	Turin
15:00 CET (UTC+01:00)	Trezeguet 10', 90+5'; Del Piero 75'	Report	Lamouchi 23'; Almeyda (red card) 84'	Stadium: Stadio delle Alpi; Attendance: 38,355; Referee: Gianluca Paparesta

24 November 2001 12	Lazio	1–0	Juventus	Rome
20:30 CET (UTC+01:00)	Liverani 49'	Report		Stadium: Stadio Olimpico; Attendance: 60,432; Referee: Pierluigi Collina

1 December 2001 13	Juventus	2–0	Perugia	Turin
20:30 CET (UTC+01:00)	Nedvěd 52'; Trezeguet 76'	Report	Blasi (red card) 69'	Stadium: Stadio delle Alpi; Attendance: 37,283; Referee: Marco Gabriele

8 December 2001 14	AC Milan	1–1	Juventus	Milan
20:30 CET (UTC+01:00)	Shevchenko 23'	Report	Del Piero 49' (pen.)	Stadium: San Siro; Attendance: 81,691; Referee: Gianluca Paparesta

16 December 2001 15	Juventus	2–0	Piacenza	Turin
15:00 CET (UTC+01:00)	Ferrara 36'; Trezeguet 90+2'	Report		Stadium: Stadio delle Alpi; Attendance: 36,246; Referee: Matteo Trefoloni

19 December 2001 6	Fiorentina	1–1	Juventus	Florence
15:00 CET (UTC+01:00)	Nuno Gomes 79'	Report	Trezeguet 57'	Stadium: Stadio Artemio Franchi; Attendance: 19,756; Referee: Cosimo Bolognino

23 December 2001 16	Brescia	0–4	Juventus	Brescia
15:00 CET (UTC+01:00)		Report	Trezeguet 30'; Del Piero 42'; Ferrara 56'; Davids 70'	Stadium: Stadio Mario Rigamonti; Attendance: 18,086; Referee: Massimo De Santis

6 January 2002 17	Juventus	3–0	Udinese	Turin
15:00 CET (UTC+01:00)	Zambrotta 15'; Nedvěd 26'; Davids 41'	Report		Stadium: Stadio delle Alpi; Attendance: 36,845; Referee: Gennaro Borriello

13 January 2002 18	Venezia	1–2	Juventus	Venice
15:00 CET (UTC+01:00)	Magallanes 59'	Report	Trezeguet 6'; Iuliano 76'	Stadium: Stadio Pier Luigi Penzo; Attendance: 11,475; Referee: Marco Gabriele

20 January 2002 19	Juventus	3–0	Atalanta	Turin
15:00 CET (UTC+01:00)	Tacchinardi 34'; Trezeguet 39', 73'	Report		Stadium: Stadio delle Alpi; Attendance: 37,605; Referee: Tiziano Pieri

27 January 2002 20	Chievo	1–3	Juventus	Verona
20:30 CET	Marazzina 59'	Report	Ferrara 18'; Moro 68' (o.g.); Del Piero 72' (pen.)	Stadium: Stadio Marc'Antonio Bentegodi; Attendance: 33,998; Referee: Massimo De Santis

3 February 2002 21	Juventus	3–0	Lecce	Turin
15:00 CET (UTC+01:00)	Conte 14'; Trezeguet 57'; Del Piero 60' (pen.)	Report		Stadium: Stadio delle Alpi; Attendance: 37,622; Referee: Matteo Trefoloni

10 February 2002 22	Roma	0–0	Juventus	Rome
20:30 CET (UTC+01:00)		Report	Iuliano (yellow card) -' (yellow-red card) 41'	Stadium: Stadio Olimpico; Attendance: 73,161; Referee: Graziano Cesari

16 February 2002 23	Juventus	2–1	Fiorentina	Turin
15:00 CET (UTC+01:00)	Trezeguet 11'; Del Piero 30'	Report	Adriano 14'; Tarozzi (yellow card) -' (yellow-red card) 71'	Stadium: Stadio delle Alpi; Attendance: 38,416; Referee: Gennaro Borriello

24 February 2002 24	Torino	2–2	Juventus	Turin
20:30 CET (UTC+01:00)	Ferrante 64'; Cauet 80'	Report	Trezeguet 10'; Maresca 89'	Stadium: Stadio delle Alpi; Attendance: 52,597; Referee: Gianluca Paparesta

3 March 2002 25	Juventus	2–1	Bologna	Turin
15:00 CET (UTC+01:00)	Trezeguet 37'; Zenoni (red card) 85'; Tarantino 89' (o.g.)	Report	Zauli 36', (red card) 85'	Stadium: Stadio delle Alpi; Attendance: 40,006; Referee: Stefano Braschi

9 March 2002 26	Internazionale	2–2	Juventus	Milan
20:30 CET (UTC+01:00)	Seedorf 6', 90+1'	Report	Trezeguet 13'; Tudor 81'	Stadium: San Siro; Attendance: 79,188; Referee: Gennaro Borriello

17 March 2002 27	Juventus	1–0	Hellas Verona	Turin
15:00 CET (UTC+01:00)	Nedvěd 39'	Report		Stadium: Stadio delle Alpi; Attendance: 38,232; Referee: Paolo Bertini

23 March 2002 28	Parma	1–0	Juventus	Parma
20:30 CET (UTC+01:00)	Lamouchi 88'	Report		Stadium: Stadio Ennio Tardini; Attendance: 25,297; Referee: Paolo Bertini

30 March 2002 29	Juventus	1–1	Lazio	Turin
20:30 CET (UTC+01:00)	Trezeguet 38'	Report	López 25'	Stadium: Stadio delle Alpi; Attendance: 40,075; Referee: Cosimo Bolognino

7 April 2002 30	Perugia	0–4	Juventus	Perugia
15:00 CEST (UTC+02:00)		Report	Trezeguet 9'; Del Piero 45+1' (pen.), 62'; C. Zenoni 57'	Stadium: Stadio Renato Curi; Attendance: 19,835; Referee: Marco Gabriele

14 April 2002 31	Juventus	1–0	AC Milan	Turin
15:00 CEST (UTC+02:00)	Chamot 78' (o.g.)	Report		Stadium: Stadio delle Alpi; Attendance: 52,505; Referee: Gennaro Borriello

21 April 2002 32	Piacenza	0–1	Juventus	Piacenza
15:00 CEST (UTC+02:00)		Report	Nedvěd 88'	Stadium: Stadio Leonardo Garilli; Attendance: 18,778; Referee: Cosimo Bolognino

28 April 2002 33	Juventus	5–0	Brescia	Turin
15:00 CEST (UTC+02:00)	Trezeguet 8', 76', 89'; Del Piero 71', 80'	Report		Stadium: Stadio delle Alpi; Attendance: 49,763; Referee: Salvatore Racalbuto

5 May 2002 34	Udinese	0–2	Juventus	Udine
15:00 CEST (UTC+02:00)		Report	Trezeguet 2'; Del Piero 11'	Stadium: Stadio Friuli; Referee: Pasquale Rodomonti P.

=== Coppa Italia ===
==== Round of 16 ====
11 November 2001 First leg	Sampdoria	1–2	Juventus	Genoa
20:45 CET (UTC+01:00)	Flachi 67', (red card) 85'	Report	Zalayeta 2'; M. Conte 42' (o.g.)	Stadium: Stadio Luigi Ferraris; Referee: Marco Gabriele

12 December 2001 Second leg	Juventus	5–2 (7–3 agg.)	Sampdoria	Turin
18:00 CET (UTC+01:00)	Maresca 5'; Ferrara 14'; Zalayeta 21'; Amoruso 31' (pen.), 42'	Report	Luiso 15'; Possanzini 79'	Stadium: Stadio delle Alpi; Referee: Nicola Ayroldi

==== Quarter-finals ====
9 January 2002 First leg	Juventus	4–2	Atalanta	Turin
20:45 CET (UTC+01:00)	Amoruso 15', 58', 82' (pen.); Zalayeta 63'	Report	Colombo 13', (red card) 74'; Berretta 65'	Stadium: Stadio delle Alpi; Referee: Matteo Trefoloni

16 January 2002 Second leg	Atalanta	2–1 (4–5 agg.)	Juventus	Bergamo
20:45 CET (UTC+01:00)	Bianchi 72'; Inacio Piá 75'	Report	Zalayeta 10'	Stadium: Stadio Atleti Azzurri d'Italia; Referee: Fiorenzo Treossi

==== Semi-finals ====
23 January 2002 First leg	AC Milan	1–2	Juventus	Milan
20:45 CET (UTC+01:00)	Javi Moreno 39'	Report	Birindelli 48'; Del Piero 86'	Stadium: San Siro; Referee: Stefano Braschi

6 February 2002 Second leg	Juventus	1–1 (3–2 agg.)	AC Milan	Turin
20:45 CET (UTC+01:00)	Zambrotta 62'	Report	José Mari 27'	Stadium: Stadio delle Alpi; Referee: Paolo Bertini

==== Final ====
25 April 2002 First leg	Juventus	2–1	Parma	Turin
20:45 CEST (UTC+02:00)	Amoruso 5' (pen.); Zalayeta 12'	Report	Nakata 90+1'	Stadium: Stadio delle Alpi; Referee: Pierluigi Collina

10 May 2002 Second leg	Parma	1–0 (a 2–2 agg.)	Juventus	Parma
20:45 CEST (UTC+02:00)	Júnior 5'	Report		Stadium: Stadio Ennio Tardini; Referee: Gianluca Paparesta

=== UEFA Champions League ===
==== Group stage ====
Pos	Team	Pld	W	D	L	GF	GA	GD	Pts	Qualification	JUV	POR	CEL	ROS
1	(Italy) Juventus	6	3	2	1	11	8	+3	11	Advance to second group stage	—	3–1	3–2	1–0
2	(Portugal) Porto	6	3	1	2	7	5	+2	10	Advance to second group stage	0–0	—	3–0	1–0
3	(Scotland) Celtic	6	3	0	3	8	11	−3	9	Transfer to UEFA Cup	4–3	1–0	—	1–0
4	(Norway) Rosenborg	6	1	1	4	4	6	−2	4		1–1	1–2	2–0	—

Source: UEFA

18 September 2001 1	Juventus (Italy)	3–2	(Scotland) Celtic	Turin, Italy
20:45 CEST (UTC+02:00)	Iuliano (yellow card) 31'; Trezeguet 43', 55'; Davids (yellow card) 42' (red card) 75'; Birindelli (yellow card) 85'; Amoruso 90' (pen.)	Report	Thompson (yellow card) 27'; Petrov 67'; Larsson 86' (pen.); Valgaeren (yellow card) 89'	Stadium: Stadio delle Alpi; Attendance: 43,017; Referee: Hellmut Krug (Germany)

25 September 2001 2	Rosenborg (Norway)	1–1	(Italy) Juventus	Trondheim, Norway
20:45 CEST (UTC+02:00)	Johnsen (yellow card) 64'; Berg (yellow card) 81'; Skammelsrud 89' (pen.)	Report	Thuram (yellow card) 4'; Zambrotta (yellow card) 68'; Del Piero 85'; Buffon (yellow card) 88'	Stadium: Lerkendal Stadion; Attendance: 20,748; Referee: Jan Wegereef (Netherlands)

3 October 2001 3	Porto (Portugal)	0–0	(Italy) Juventus	Porto, Portugal
20:45 CEST (UTC+02:00)	Carvalho (yellow card) 52'; Deco (yellow card) 86'	Report	Tudor (yellow card) 19'; Paramatti (yellow card) 56'; Del Piero (yellow card) 63'	Stadium: Estádio das Antas; Attendance: 40,228; Referee: Manuel Mejuto González (Spain)

24 October 2001 4	Juventus (Italy)	1–0	(Norway) Rosenborg	Turin, Italy
20:45 CEST (UTC+02:00)	Trezeguet 25'	Report		Stadium: Stadio delle Alpi; Attendance: 38,642; Referee: Graham Poll (England)

30 October 2001 5	Juventus (Italy)	3–1	(Portugal) Porto	Turin, Italy
20:45 CEST (UTC+02:00)	Del Piero 32'; Montero 47'; Davids (yellow card) 71'; Trezeguet 73'	Report	Clayton 13'; Costinha (yellow card) 69'; Postiga (yellow card) 90+2'	Stadium: Stadio delle Alpi; Attendance: 38,328; Referee: Anders Frisk (Sweden)

7 November 2001 6	Celtic (Scotland)	4–3	(Italy) Juventus	Glasgow, Scotland
20:45 CET (UTC+01:00)	Moravčík (yellow card) 13'; Valgaeren (yellow card) 22', (goal) 24'; Sutton 45', 64'; Larsson 57' (pen.)	Report	Del Piero 19'; Nedvěd (yellow card) 37'; Trezeguet 51', 77'; Iuliano (yellow card) 56'; Ferrara (yellow card) 86'	Stadium: Celtic Park; Attendance: 57,717; Referee: Gilles Veissière (France)

==== Second group stage ====
Pos	Team	Pld	W	D	L	GF	GA	GD	Pts	Qualification	BL	DEP	ARS	JUV
1	(Germany) Bayer Leverkusen	6	3	1	2	11	11	0	10	knockout stage	—	3–0	1–1	3–1
2	(Spain) Deportivo La Coruña	6	3	1	2	7	6	+1	10	knockout stage	1–3	—	2–0	2–0
3	(England) Arsenal	6	2	1	3	8	8	0	7		4–1	0–2	—	3–1
4	(Italy) Juventus	6	2	1	3	7	8	−1	7		4–0	0–0	1–0	—

Source: UEFA

28 November 2001 1	Juventus (Italy)	4–0	(Germany) Bayer Leverkusen	Turin, Italy
15:00 CET (UTC+01:00)	Trezeguet 8', 60'; Birindelli (yellow card) 25'; Del Piero 37'; Tudor 44'; Nedvěd (yellow card) 51'	Report	Ballack (yellow card) 54'	Stadium: Stadio delle Alpi; Attendance: 4,926; Referee: Urs Meier (Switzerland)
Note: The game was originally scheduled for November 21, but had to be postponed to November 28 due to heavy fog in Turin. The game was postponed for one more day because of the same issues of low visibility.

11 December 2001 2	Arsenal (England)	3–1	(Italy) Juventus	London, England
20:45 CET (UTC+01:00)	Ljungberg 21', 88'; Henry 28'; Kanu (yellow card) 65'	Report	Nedvěd (yellow card) 33'; Birindelli (yellow card) 39'; Taylor 49' (o.g.)	Stadium: Highbury; Attendance: 35,421; Referee: Vítor Melo Pereira (Portugal)

19 February 2002 3	Juventus (Italy)	0–0	(Spain) Deportivo La Coruña	Turin, Italy
20:45 CET (UTC+01:00)	Thuram (yellow card) 28'; Conte (yellow card) 53'	Report	Berenguel (yellow card) 17'; Silva (yellow card) 61'	Stadium: Stadio delle Alpi; Attendance: 9,836; Referee: Hugh Dallas (Scotland)

27 February 2002 4	Deportivo La Coruña (Spain)	2–0	(Italy) Juventus	A Coruña, Spain
20:45 CET (UTC+01:00)	Tristán 8'; Djalminha 77'	Report	Iuliano (yellow card) 51'; Davids (yellow card) 73' (red card) 74'; Ferrara (yellow card) 83'	Stadium: Estadio Riazor; Attendance: 24,885; Referee: Anders Frisk (Sweden)

12 March 2002 5	Bayer Leverkusen (Germany)	3–1	(Italy) Juventus	Leverkusen, Germany
20:45 CET (UTC+01:00)	Butt 24' (pen.); Brdarić (yellow card) 29', (goal) 71'; Sebescen (yellow card) 41'; Placente (yellow card) 73'; Babić 90+1', (yellow card) 90+1'	Report	Ferrara (yellow card) 14'; Tudor 61'; Zalayeta (yellow card) 64'; Nedvěd (yellow card) 86'	Stadium: BayArena; Attendance: 22,500; Referee: Kim Milton Nielsen (Denmark)

20 March 2002 6	Juventus (Italy)	1–0	(England) Arsenal	Turin, Italy
20:45 CET (UTC+01:00)	Davids (yellow card) 43'; Zalayeta 76'; Pessotto (yellow card) 90+1'	Report	Vieira (yellow card) 27'	Stadium: Stadio delle Alpi; Attendance: 7,070; Referee: Karl Erik Nillson (Sweden)

== Statistics ==
=== Appearances and goals ===
Not including Coppa Italia appearances

No.	Pos	Nat	Player	Total		Serie A		Coppa		Champions League	
No.	Pos	Nat	Player	Apps	Goals	Apps	Goals	Apps	Goals	Apps	Goals
1	GK	(Italy) ITA	Gianluigi Buffon	45	0	34	0	1	0	10	0
13	DF	(Italy) ITA	Mark Iuliano	39	1	25+1	1	5	0	7+1	0
21	DF	(France) FRA	Lilian Thuram	41	0	30	0	3	0	8	0
2	DF	(Italy) ITA	Ciro Ferrara	30	3	21+1	3	4	0	4	0
7	DF	(Italy) ITA	Gianluca Pessotto	44	0	28+1	0	4	0	9+2	0
19	MF	(Italy) ITA	Gianluca Zambrotta	47	2	28+4	1	6	1	9	0
20	MF	(Italy) ITA	Alessio Tacchinardi	44	2	26+1	2	7	0	10	0
26	MF	(Netherlands) NED	Edgar Davids	42	2	23+5	2	5	0	6+3	0
11	MF	(Czech Republic) CZE	Pavel Nedvěd	43	4	32	4	4	0	7	0
10	FW	(Italy) ITA	Alessandro Del Piero	46	20	31+1	16	4	0	10	4
17	FW	(France) FRA	David Trezeguet	46	32	33+1	24	2	0	9+1	8
22	GK	(Uruguay) URU	Fabián Carini	8	0	0	0	6	0	2	0
8	MF	(Italy) ITA	Antonio Conte	29	1	16+4	1	5	0	3+1	0
4	DF	(Uruguay) URU	Paolo Montero	27	1	13+3	0	4	0	7	1
14	MF	(Italy) ITA	Cristian Zenoni	39	1	10+14	1	7	0	5+3	0
5	DF	(Croatia) CRO	Igor Tudor	21	6	10+4	4	1	0	5+1	2
15	DF	(Italy) ITA	Alessandro Birindelli	27	1	5+5	0	8	1	7+2	0
3	DF	(Italy) ITA	Michele Paramatti	24	0	2+8	0	8	0	3+3	0
27	FW	(Italy) ITA	Nicola Amoruso	22	7	2+7	0	7	6	2+4	1
9	FW	(Chile) CHI	Marcelo Salas	12	1	2+5	1	1	0	2+2	0
16	MF	(Italy) ITA	Enzo Maresca	27	2	1+14	1	4	1	4+4	0
25	FW	(Uruguay) URU	Marcelo Zalayeta	22	6	1+9	0	8	5	1+3	1
36	MF	(Uzbekistan) UZB	Ilyos Zeytulayev	3	0	0+1	0	2	0	0	0
30	MF	(Italy) ITA	Alessandro Frara	1	0	0	0	0	0	0+1	0
33	FW	(France) FRA	Vincent Péricard	2	0	0	0	1	0	0+1	0
38	FW	(Paraguay) PAR	Tomás Guzmán	1	0	0	0	0	0	0+1	0
Players transferred out during the season
6	MF	(Uruguay) URU	Fabián O'Neill	7	0	1+3	0	0	0	1+2	0

Last updated: 10 May 2002
Source: Competitions
