= 2001–02 Manchester United F.C. season =

English football club season

Manchester United
2001–02 season
- Chairman: Martin Edwards
- Manager: Sir Alex Ferguson
- Premier League: 3rd
- FA Cup: Fourth round
- League Cup: Third round
- UEFA Champions League: Semi-finals
- Charity Shield: Runners-up
- Top goalscorer: League: Ruud van Nistelrooy (23); All: Ruud van Nistelrooy (36)
- Highest home attendance: 67,683 vs Middlesbrough (23 March 2002)
- Lowest home attendance: 64,827 vs Lille (18 September 2001)
- Average home league attendance: 67,586
| Home colours | Away colours | Third colours |

The 2001–02 season was Manchester United's tenth season in the Premier League, their 100th season in league football, and their 27th consecutive season in the top division of English football.

In May 2001, at the conclusion of the previous season, Sir Alex Ferguson had announced his intention to retire from football at the end of this season, and the club began the process of trying to find a successor for the most successful manager in their history. Months later, however, he reversed his decision, citing his wife and three sons as the reason for the u-turn.

The second full season of the new millennium was a disappointing one for the Red Devils as they failed to win any silverware for the first time in four years. The club finished third place in the league, their lowest finish in the Premier League era at that time, and they were knocked out of the FA Cup in the fourth round. They were also knocked out of the League Cup after fielding what was effectively a reserve team against a strong Arsenal side in the third round. United's best success this season came in the UEFA Champions League, in which they reached the semi-finals before being knocked out by eventual runners-up Bayer Leverkusen on away goals. Ultimately, United's failure to win anything came down to a dismal run of form in November and early December when they suffered five defeats in seven league games, including three defeats in a row against Arsenal, Chelsea and West Ham United. They also lost six home games in the Premier League, their worst home record since the 1977–78 season; Ferguson cited this as the main reason why they failed to win the league. They only lost three more league games all season, but that terrible form earlier in the campaign counted against United for the rest of the campaign and they finished 10 points behind champions Arsenal (who secured the title by defeating United 1–0 at Old Trafford in the penultimate game of the season) and three points behind runners-up Liverpool.

Assistant manager Steve McClaren left the club before the start of the season to become the manager of Middlesbrough. Youth team coach and former player Mike Phelan was promoted to first-team coach and took over some of the assistant manager's responsibilities, but McClaren was not replaced until the summer of 2002, when Carlos Queiroz was appointed the new assistant manager.

Winger Ryan Giggs was honoured with a testimonial match against Celtic, having now been at United for more than a decade.

£19 million striker Ruud van Nistelrooy did what was expected of him by scoring 36 goals in all competitions and collecting the PFA Player of the Year award, but £28.1 million national record signing Juan Sebastián Verón was a major disappointment in midfield, though it was in defence where United were at their weakest following the shock departure of Jaap Stam to Lazio just after the start of the season, and the surprise acquisition of 35-year-old Frenchman Laurent Blanc as his successor.

2001–02 was the final season at Old Trafford for veteran players Denis Irwin and Ronny Johnsen after 12 and six years at the club respectively. Also on the way out of the club were goalkeeper Raimond van der Gouw and striker Dwight Yorke. Striker Andy Cole left United after seven years when he sealed a transfer to Blackburn Rovers at the end of December.

== Pre-season and friendlies ==
| Date | Opponents | H/A | Result F–A | Scorers | Attendance |
|---|---|---|---|---|---|
| 22 July 2001 | Malaysia All-Stars | N | 6–0 | Van Nistelrooy (2) 7', 36', Beckham 29', Cole (2) 46', 78', Chadwick 71' | 68,000 |
| 24 July 2001 | Team Singapore | A | 8–1 | Solskjær (2) 30', 45', P. Neville 40', Beckham 52', Yorke (2) 65', 71', Van Nistelrooy 73', Giggs 90' | 44,000 |
| 29 July 2001 | Thailand | A | 2–1 | Giggs 29', Yorke 78' | 65,000 |
| 1 August 2001 | Celtic | H | 3–4 | Van Nistelrooy (2) 24', 84', Verón 64' | 66,957 |
| 4 August 2001 | Wrexham | A | 2–2 | Solskjær 31', Verón 58' | 7,614 |
| 4 August 2001 | Hereford United | A | 6–0 | Butt 23', Fortune 45', 65', Yorke 69', Cole 78', 87' | 4,625 |
| 8 August 2001 | Bury | A | 3–0 | P. Neville 49', Yorke 62', Solskjær 69' | 9,929 |
| 12 November 2001 | Barnsley | A | 0–1 | | |

On 4 August 2001, United played two friendly matches simultaneously, against Wrexham (Brian Flynn's and Kevin Reeves' testimonial) and Hereford United. The first-team squad was split in two, with Jimmy Ryan taking charge at Hereford.

== FA Charity Shield ==
| Date | Opponents | H/A | Result F–A | Scorers | Attendance |
|---|---|---|---|---|---|
| 12 August 2001 | Liverpool | N | 1–2 | Van Nistelrooy 51' | 70,227 |

== Premier League ==
| Date | Opponents | H/A | Result F–A | Scorers | Attendance | League position |
|---|---|---|---|---|---|---|
| 19 August 2001 | Fulham | H | 3–2 | Beckham 36', Van Nistelrooy (2) 51', 53' | 67,534 | 4th |
| 22 August 2001 | Blackburn Rovers | A | 2–2 | Giggs 20', Beckham 78' | 29,836 | 3rd |
| 26 August 2001 | Aston Villa | A | 1–1 | Alpay 90' (o.g.) | 42,632 | 5th |
| 8 September 2001 | Everton | H | 4–1 | Verón 4', Cole 40', Fortune 46', Beckham 90' | 67,534 | 2nd |
| 15 September 2001 | Newcastle United | A | 3–4 | Van Nistelrooy 29', Giggs 62', Verón 64' | 52,056 | 4th |
| 22 September 2001 | Ipswich Town | H | 4–0 | Johnsen 13', Solskjær (2) 20', 90', Cole 89' | 67,551 | 3rd |
| 29 September 2001 | Tottenham Hotspur | A | 5–3 | Cole 46', Blanc 58', Van Nistelrooy 72', Verón 76', Beckham 87' | 36,038 | 2nd |
| 13 October 2001 | Sunderland | A | 3–1 | Varga 35' (o.g.), Giggs 59', Cole 66' | 48,305 | 3rd |
| 20 October 2001 | Bolton Wanderers | H | 1–2 | Verón 25' | 67,559 | 3rd |
| 27 October 2001 | Leeds United | H | 1–1 | Solskjær 89' | 67,555 | 5th |
| 4 November 2001 | Liverpool | A | 1–3 | Beckham 50' | 44,361 | 6th |
| 17 November 2001 | Leicester City | H | 2–0 | Van Nistelrooy 21', Yorke 50' | 67,651 | 4th |
| 25 November 2001 | Arsenal | A | 1–3 | Scholes 14' | 38,174 | 6th |
| 1 December 2001 | Chelsea | H | 0–3 | | 67,544 | 7th |
| 8 December 2001 | West Ham United | H | 0–1 | | 67,582 | 9th |
| 12 December 2001 | Derby County | H | 5–0 | Solskjær (2) 6', 58', Keane 10', Van Nistelrooy 63', Scholes 89' | 67,577 | 5th |
| 15 December 2001 | Middlesbrough | A | 1–0 | Van Nistelrooy 76' | 34,358 | 5th |
| 22 December 2001 | Southampton | H | 6–1 | Van Nistelrooy (3) 1', 34', 54', Solskjær 41', Keane 72', P. Neville 78' | 67,638 | 4th |
| 26 December 2001 | Everton | A | 2–0 | Giggs 78', Van Nistelrooy 85' | 39,948 | 5th |
| 30 December 2001 | Fulham | A | 3–2 | Giggs (2) 5', 47', Van Nistelrooy 45' | 21,159 | 5th |
| 2 January 2002 | Newcastle United | H | 3–1 | Van Nistelrooy 24', Scholes (2) 50', 62' | 67,646 | 2nd |
| 13 January 2002 | Southampton | A | 3–1 | Van Nistelrooy 9', Beckham 45', Solskjær 63' | 31,858 | 1st |
| 19 January 2002 | Blackburn Rovers | H | 2–1 | Van Nistelrooy 45' (pen.), Keane 81' | 67,552 | 1st |
| 22 January 2002 | Liverpool | H | 0–1 | | 67,599 | 1st |
| 29 January 2002 | Bolton Wanderers | A | 4–0 | Solskjær (3) 15', 39', 64', Van Nistelrooy 83' | 27,350 | 1st |
| 2 February 2002 | Sunderland | H | 4–1 | P. Neville 6', Beckham 25', Van Nistelrooy (2) 28', 44' (pen.) | 67,587 | 1st |
| 10 February 2002 | Charlton Athletic | A | 2–0 | Solskjær (2) 33', 74' | 26,475 | 1st |
| 23 February 2002 | Aston Villa | H | 1–0 | Van Nistelrooy 50' | 67,592 | 1st |
| 3 March 2002 | Derby County | A | 2–2 | Scholes 41', Verón 60' | 33,041 | 1st |
| 6 March 2002 | Tottenham Hotspur | H | 4–0 | Beckham (2) 15', 64', Van Nistelrooy (2) 43' (pen.), 76' | 67,599 | 1st |
| 16 March 2002 | West Ham United | A | 5–3 | Beckham (2) 17', 89' (pen.), Butt 22', Scholes 55', Solskjær 64' | 35,281 | 1st |
| 23 March 2002 | Middlesbrough | H | 0–1 | | 67,683 | 1st |
| 30 March 2002 | Leeds United | A | 4–3 | Scholes 9', Solskjær (2) 37', 39', Giggs 54' | 40,058 | 2nd |
| 6 April 2002 | Leicester City | A | 1–0 | Solskjær 61' | 21,447 | 2nd |
| 20 April 2002 | Chelsea | A | 3–0 | Scholes 15', Van Nistelrooy 41', Solskjær 86' | 41,725 | 2nd |
| 27 April 2002 | Ipswich Town | A | 1–0 | Van Nistelrooy 45' (pen.) | 28,433 | 2nd |
| 8 May 2002 | Arsenal | H | 0–1 | | 67,580 | 3rd |
| 11 May 2002 | Charlton Athletic | H | 0–0 | | 67,571 | 3rd |

| Pos | Team | Pld | W | D | L | GF | GA | GD | Pts | Qualification or relegation |
|---|---|---|---|---|---|---|---|---|---|---|
| 1 | Arsenal (C) | 38 | 26 | 9 | 3 | 79 | 36 | +43 | 87 | Qualification for the Champions League first group stage |
| 2 | Liverpool | 38 | 24 | 8 | 6 | 67 | 30 | +37 | 80 | Qualification for the Champions League first group stage |
| 3 | Manchester United | 38 | 24 | 5 | 9 | 87 | 45 | +42 | 77 | Qualification for the Champions League third qualifying round |
| 4 | Newcastle United | 38 | 21 | 8 | 9 | 74 | 52 | +22 | 71 | Qualification for the Champions League third qualifying round |
| 5 | Leeds United | 38 | 18 | 12 | 8 | 53 | 37 | +16 | 66 | Qualification for the UEFA Cup first round (Note: Since Arsenal qualified for the Champions League, their UEFA Cup place as FA Cup winners defaulted to Chelsea, the losing finalists.) |

Source: Premier League
Rules for classification: 1) points; 2) goal difference; 3) number of goals scored.
(C) Champions

== FA Cup ==
| Date | Round | Opponents | H/A | Result F–A | Scorers | Attendance |
|---|---|---|---|---|---|---|
| 6 January 2002 | Round 3 | Aston Villa | A | 3–2 | Solskjær 77', Van Nistelrooy (2) 80', 82' | 38,444 |
| 26 January 2002 | Round 4 | Middlesbrough | A | 0–2 | | 17,624 |

== League Cup ==
| Date | Round | Opponents | H/A | Result F–A | Scorers | Attendance |
|---|---|---|---|---|---|---|
| 5 November 2001 | Round 3 | Arsenal | A | 0–4 | | 30,693 |

== UEFA Champions League ==
=== Group stage ===
| Date | Opponents | H/A | Result F–A | Scorers | Attendance | Group position |
|---|---|---|---|---|---|---|
| 18 September 2001 | Lille | H | 1–0 | Beckham 90' | 64,827 | 1st |
| 25 September 2001 | Deportivo La Coruña | A | 1–2 | Scholes 40' | 33,108 | 2nd |
| 10 October 2001 | Olympiacos | A | 2–0 | Beckham 66', Cole 82' | 73,537 | 1st |
| 17 October 2001 | Deportivo La Coruña | H | 2–3 | Van Nistelrooy (2) 7', 40' | 65,585 | 2nd |
| 23 October 2001 | Olympiacos | H | 3–0 | Solskjær 80', Giggs 88', Van Nistelrooy 90' | 66,769 | 2nd |
| 31 October 2001 | Lille | A | 1–1 | Solskjær 6' | 37,400 | 2nd |

| Pos | Team | Pld | W | D | L | GF | GA | GD | Pts | Qualification |
|---|---|---|---|---|---|---|---|---|---|---|
| 1 | (Spain) Deportivo La Coruña | 6 | 2 | 4 | 0 | 10 | 8 | +2 | 10 | Advance to second group stage |
| 2 | (England) Manchester United | 6 | 3 | 1 | 2 | 10 | 6 | +4 | 10 | Advance to second group stage |
| 3 | (France) Lille | 6 | 1 | 3 | 2 | 7 | 7 | 0 | 6 | Transfer to UEFA Cup |
| 4 | (Greece) Olympiacos | 6 | 1 | 2 | 3 | 6 | 12 | −6 | 5 | |

Source: RSSSF

=== Second group stage ===
| Date | Opponents | H/A | Result F–A | Scorers | Attendance | Group position |
|---|---|---|---|---|---|---|
| 20 November 2001 | Bayern Munich | A | 1–1 | Van Nistelrooy 74' | 59,000 | 2nd |
| 5 December 2001 | Boavista | H | 3–0 | Van Nistelrooy (2) 31', 62', Blanc 55' | 66,274 | 1st |
| 20 February 2002 | Nantes | A | 1–1 | Van Nistelrooy 90' (pen.) | 38,285 | 1st |
| 26 February 2002 | Nantes | H | 5–1 | Beckham 18', Solskjær (2) 31', 78', Silvestre 38', Van Nistelrooy 64' (pen.) | 66,492 | 1st |
| 13 March 2002 | Bayern Munich | H | 0–0 | | 66,818 | 1st |
| 19 March 2002 | Boavista | A | 3–0 | Blanc 14', Solskjær 29', Beckham 51' (pen.) | 13,223 | 1st |

| Pos | Team | Pld | W | D | L | GF | GA | GD | Pts | Qualification | MUN | BAY | BOA | NAN |
|---|---|---|---|---|---|---|---|---|---|---|---|---|---|---|
| 1 | (England) Manchester United | 6 | 3 | 3 | 0 | 13 | 3 | +10 | 12 | Advance to knockout stage | — | 0–0 | 3–0 | 5–1 |
| 2 | (Germany) Bayern Munich | 6 | 3 | 3 | 0 | 5 | 2 | +3 | 12 | Advance to knockout stage | 1–1 | — | 1–0 | 2–1 |
| 3 | (Portugal) Boavista | 6 | 1 | 2 | 3 | 2 | 8 | −6 | 5 | | 0–3 | 0–0 | — | 1–0 |
| 4 | (France) Nantes | 6 | 0 | 2 | 4 | 4 | 11 | −7 | 2 | | 1–1 | 0–1 | 1–1 | — |

Source: RSSSF

=== Knockout phase ===
| Date | Round | Opponents | H/A | Result F–A | Scorers | Attendance |
|---|---|---|---|---|---|---|
| 2 April 2002 | Quarter-final; First leg | Deportivo La Coruña | A | 2–0 | Beckham 15', Van Nistelrooy 41' | 32,351 |
| 10 April 2002 | Quarter-final; Second leg | Deportivo La Coruña | H | 3–2 | Solskjær (2) 23', 56', Giggs 69' | 65,875 |
| 24 April 2002 | Semi-final; First leg | Bayer Leverkusen | H | 2–2 | Živković 29' (o.g.), Van Nistelrooy 67' (pen.) | 66,534 |
| 30 April 2002 | Semi-final; Second leg | Bayer Leverkusen | A | 1–1 | Keane 28' | 22,500 |

== Squad statistics ==
| No. | Pos. | Name | League | | FA Cup | | League Cup | | Europe | | Other | | Total | |
| No. | Pos. | Name | Apps | Goals | Apps | Goals | Apps | Goals | Apps | Goals | Apps | Goals | Apps | Goals |
|---|---|---|---|---|---|---|---|---|---|---|---|---|---|---|
| 1 | GK | (France) Fabien Barthez | 32 | 0 | 1 | 0 | 0 | 0 | 15 | 0 | 1 | 0 | 49 | 0 |
| 2 | DF | (England) Gary Neville | 31(3) | 0 | 2 | 0 | 0 | 0 | 14 | 0 | 1 | 0 | 48(3) | 0 |
| 3 | DF | (Republic of Ireland) Denis Irwin | 10(2) | 0 | 0 | 0 | 0 | 0 | 8(2) | 0 | 1 | 0 | 19(4) | 0 |
| 4 | MF | (Argentina) Juan Sebastián Verón | 24(2) | 5 | 1 | 0 | 0 | 0 | 13 | 0 | 0 | 0 | 38(2) | 5 |
| 5 | DF | (Norway) Ronny Johnsen | 9(1) | 1 | 0 | 0 | 0 | 0 | 8(1) | 0 | 0 | 0 | 17(2) | 1 |
| 6 | DF | (France) Laurent Blanc | 29 | 1 | 2 | 0 | 0 | 0 | 15 | 2 | 0 | 0 | 46 | 3 |
| 6 | DF | (Netherlands) Jaap Stam | 1 | 0 | 0 | 0 | 0 | 0 | 0 | 0 | 1 | 0 | 2 | 0 |
| 7 | MF | (England) David Beckham | 23(5) | 11 | 1 | 0 | 0 | 0 | 13 | 5 | 1 | 0 | 38(5) | 16 |
| 8 | MF | (England) Nicky Butt | 20(5) | 1 | 2 | 0 | 0 | 0 | 8(1) | 0 | 1 | 0 | 31(6) | 1 |
| 9 | FW | (England) Andy Cole | 7(4) | 4 | 0 | 0 | 0 | 0 | 1(3) | 1 | 0 | 0 | 8(7) | 5 |
| 10 | FW | (Netherlands) Ruud van Nistelrooy | 29(3) | 23 | 0(2) | 2 | 0 | 0 | 14 | 10 | 1 | 1 | 44(5) | 36 |
| 11 | MF | (Wales) Ryan Giggs | 18(7) | 7 | 0(1) | 0 | 0 | 0 | 13 | 2 | 1 | 0 | 32(8) | 9 |
| 12 | DF | (England) Phil Neville | 21(7) | 2 | 2 | 0 | 1 | 0 | 3(4) | 0 | 0 | 0 | 27(11) | 2 |
| 13 | GK | (Northern Ireland) Roy Carroll | 6(1) | 0 | 1 | 0 | 1 | 0 | 1 | 0 | 0 | 0 | 9(1) | 0 |
| 14 | DF | (England) David May | 2 | 0 | 0 | 0 | 0 | 0 | 1 | 0 | 0 | 0 | 3 | 0 |
| 15 | MF | (England) Luke Chadwick | 5(3) | 0 | 1(1) | 0 | 1 | 0 | 0 | 0 | 0 | 0 | 7(4) | 0 |
| 16 | MF | (Republic of Ireland) Roy Keane (c) | 28 | 3 | 2 | 0 | 0 | 0 | 11(1) | 1 | 1 | 0 | 42(1) | 4 |
| 17 | GK | (Netherlands) Raimond van der Gouw | 0(1) | 0 | 0 | 0 | 0(1) | 0 | 0 | 0 | 0 | 0 | 0(2) | 0 |
| 18 | MF | (England) Paul Scholes | 30(5) | 8 | 2 | 0 | 0 | 0 | 13 | 1 | 1 | 0 | 46(5) | 9 |
| 19 | FW | (Trinidad and Tobago) Dwight Yorke | 4(6) | 1 | 0(1) | 0 | 1 | 0 | 1(2) | 0 | 0(1) | 0 | 6(10) | 1 |
| 20 | FW | (Norway) Ole Gunnar Solskjær | 23(7) | 17 | 2 | 1 | 0 | 0 | 5(10) | 7 | 0 | 0 | 30(17) | 25 |
| 21 | FW | (Uruguay) Diego Forlán | 6(7) | 0 | 0 | 0 | 0 | 0 | 1(4) | 0 | 0 | 0 | 7(11) | 0 |
| 22 | DF | (England) Ronnie Wallwork | 0(1) | 0 | 1 | 0 | 1 | 0 | 0 | 0 | 0 | 0 | 2(1) | 0 |
| 23 | DF | (England) Michael Clegg | 0 | 0 | 0 | 0 | 0(1) | 0 | 0 | 0 | 0 | 0 | 0(1) | 0 |
| 24 | DF | (England) Wes Brown | 15(2) | 0 | 0 | 0 | 0 | 0 | 5(2) | 0 | 0 | 0 | 20(4) | 0 |
| 25 | MF | (South Africa) Quinton Fortune | 8(6) | 1 | 0 | 0 | 0 | 0 | 3(2) | 0 | 0 | 0 | 11(8) | 1 |
| 27 | DF | (France) Mikaël Silvestre | 31(4) | 0 | 2 | 0 | 0 | 0 | 10(3) | 1 | 1 | 0 | 44(7) | 1 |
| 28 | MF | (Scotland) Michael Stewart | 2(1) | 0 | 0 | 0 | 1 | 0 | 0(1) | 0 | 0 | 0 | 3(2) | 0 |
| 30 | DF | (Republic of Ireland) John O'Shea | 4(5) | 0 | 0 | 0 | 1 | 0 | 0(3) | 0 | 0 | 0 | 5(8) | 0 |
| 32 | MF | (Sweden) Bojan Djordjic | 0 | 0 | 0 | 0 | 1 | 0 | 0 | 0 | 0 | 0 | 1 | 0 |
| 34 | DF | (England) Lee Roche | 0 | 0 | 0 | 0 | 1 | 0 | 0 | 0 | 0 | 0 | 1 | 0 |
| 36 | FW | (England) Jimmy Davis | 0 | 0 | 0 | 0 | 1 | 0 | 0 | 0 | 0 | 0 | 1 | 0 |
| 37 | FW | (England) Danny Webber | 0 | 0 | 0 | 0 | 1 | 0 | 0 | 0 | 0 | 0 | 1 | 0 |
| 40 | FW | (England) Daniel Nardiello | 0 | 0 | 0 | 0 | 0(1) | 0 | 0 | 0 | 0 | 0 | 0(1) | 0 |
| – | – | Own goals | – | 2 | – | 0 | – | 0 | – | 1 | – | 0 | – | 3 |

== Transfers ==
United's first departures of the 2001–02 season were midfield duo Jonathan Greening and Mark Wilson, who both signed for Middlesbrough on 9 August. On 27 August, Jaap Stam was controversially sold to Lazio for a fee of £16.5 million, while on 8 November, Jesper Blomqvist signed for Everton.

Arriving in the summer transfer window were Northern Irish goalkeeper Roy Carroll, Dutch forward Ruud van Nistelrooy, Argentinian midfielder Juan Sebastián Verón and French defender Laurent Blanc. Out of these players, only van Nistelrooy made much of an impact, staying at United until 2006 and scoring 150 goals in 219 appearances for United.

Departing during the winter transfer window were forward Andy Cole, who left United after six years, and Michael Clegg, who signed for Oldham Athletic on a free transfer. Paul Rachubka left United on 20 May for Charlton Athletic. Goalkeeper Raimond van der Gouw signed for West Ham United on 28 June on a free transfer, while on 30 June, defenders Denis Irwin, Ronny Johnsen and Ronnie Wallwork were released.

Luke Steele joined United on 11 May for a fee of £500,000.

=== In ===
| Date | Pos. | Name | From | Fee |
|---|---|---|---|---|
| 1 July 2001 | GK | (Northern Ireland) Roy Carroll | (England) Wigan Athletic | Undisclosed |
| 1 July 2001 | FW | (Netherlands) Ruud van Nistelrooy | (Netherlands) PSV Eindhoven | £19m |
| 12 July 2001 | MF | (Argentina) Juan Sebastián Verón | (Italy) Lazio | £28.1m |
| 30 August 2001 | DF | (France) Laurent Blanc | (Italy) Inter Milan | Free |
| 22 January 2002 | FW | (Uruguay) Diego Forlán | (Argentina) Independiente | £7.5m |
| 11 May 2002 | GK | (England) Luke Steele | (England) Peterborough United | £500k |

=== Out ===
| Date | Pos. | Name | To | Fee |
|---|---|---|---|---|
| 9 August 2001 | MF | (England) Jonathan Greening | (England) Middlesbrough | £2m |
| 9 August 2001 | MF | (England) Mark Wilson | (England) Middlesbrough | £1.5m |
| 27 August 2001 | DF | (Netherlands) Jaap Stam | (Italy) Lazio | £16.5m |
| 8 November 2001 | MF | (Sweden) Jesper Blomqvist | (England) Everton | Free |
| 29 December 2001 | FW | (England) Andy Cole | (England) Blackburn Rovers | Undisclosed |
| 19 February 2002 | DF | (England) Michael Clegg | (England) Oldham Athletic | Free |
| 17 May 2002 | GK | (England) Paul Rachubka | (England) Charlton Athletic | £200k |
| 28 June 2002 | GK | (Netherlands) Raimond van der Gouw | (England) West Ham United | Free |
| 30 June 2002 | DF | (Republic of Ireland) Denis Irwin | (England) Wolverhampton Wanderers | Free |
| 30 June 2002 | DF | (Norway) Ronny Johnsen | (England) Aston Villa | Free |
| 30 June 2002 | DF | (England) Ronnie Wallwork | (England) West Bromwich Albion | Free |

=== Loan in ===
| Date from | Date to | Pos. | Name | From |
|---|---|---|---|---|
| 4 March 2002 | 30 June 2002 | GK | (England) Luke Steele | (England) Peterborough United |

=== Loan out ===
| Date from | Date to | Pos. | Name | To |
|---|---|---|---|---|
| 23 November 2001 | 22 December 2001 | FW | (England) Danny Webber | (England) Port Vale |
| 23 November 2001 | 17 May 2002 | GK | (England) Paul Rachubka | (England) Oldham Athletic |
| 7 December 2001 | 30 June 2002 | MF | (Sweden) Bojan Djordjic | (England) Sheffield Wednesday |
| 28 March 2002 | 27 April 2002 | FW | (England) Danny Webber | (England) Watford |
