= 2002 UEFA Champions League final =

Association football match

- Match programme cover
- Event: 2001–02 UEFA Champions League
Bayer Leverkusen	Real Madrid
(Germany)	(Spain)
1	2
- Date: 15 May 2002
- Venue: Hampden Park, Glasgow
- Man of the Match: Zinedine Zidane (Real Madrid)
- Referee: Urs Meier (Switzerland)
- Attendance: 50,499
- Weather: Mostly cloudy, rain showers 15 °C (59 °F)

The 2002 UEFA Champions League final was the final match of the 2001–02 UEFA Champions League, Europe's primary club football competition. The show-piece event was contested between Bayer Leverkusen of Germany and Real Madrid of Spain at Hampden Park in Glasgow, Scotland, on 15 May 2002 to decide the winner of the Champions League. Leverkusen appeared in the final for the first time, whereas Real Madrid appeared in their 12th final.

Each club needed to progress through two group stages, and two knockout rounds to reach the final. Real Madrid won their group and moved into the second group stage, which they also won, before facing the defending champions Bayern Munich and Barcelona in the knockout stage. Bayer Leverkusen finished second in their group behind Barcelona and progressed to the second group stage. There, they won their group, before beating the likes of Liverpool and Manchester United to progress to the final.

Before the match, a minute of silence was held in honour of Ukrainian manager Valeriy Lobanovskyi, who died two days earlier.

Real Madrid were regarded as favourites before the match and took the lead in the eighth minute through Raúl. Lúcio equalised five minutes later, before Zinedine Zidane scored the winning goal on the stroke of half-time, a left-footed volley into the top corner that has since gone down as one of the greatest goals in the history of the competition, to secure Real Madrid's ninth European Cup.

== Teams ==
In the following table, finals until 1992 were in the European Cup era, since 1993 were in the UEFA Champions League era.

Teams	Previous finals appearances (bold indicates winners)
(Germany) Bayer Leverkusen	None
(Spain) Real Madrid	11 (**1956**, **1957**, **1958**, **1959**, **1960**, 1962, 1964, **1966**, 1981, **1998**, **2000**)

== Route to the final ==
(Germany) Bayer Leverkusen				Round	(Spain) Real Madrid			
Opponent	Agg.	1st leg	2nd leg	Qualifying phase	Opponent	Agg.	1st leg	2nd leg
(Federal Republic of Yugoslavia) Red Star Belgrade	3–0	3–0 (H)	0–0 (A)	Third qualifying round	Bye			
Opponent	Result			First group stage	Opponent	Result		
(France) Lyon	1–0 (A)			Matchday 1	(Italy) Roma	2–1 (A)		
(Spain) Barcelona	2–1 (H)			Matchday 2	(Russia) Lokomotiv Moscow	4–0 (H)		
(Turkey) Fenerbahçe	2–1 (H)			Matchday 3	(Belgium) Anderlecht	4–1 (H)		
(Spain) Barcelona	1–2 (A)			Matchday 4	(Belgium) Anderlecht	2–0 (A)		
(Turkey) Fenerbahçe	2–1 (A)			Matchday 5	(Italy) Roma	1–1 (H)		
(France) Lyon	2–4 (H)			Matchday 6	(Russia) Lokomotiv Moscow	0–2 (A)		
**Group F runners-up**: Pos / Team / Pld / Pts; 1 / (Spain) Barcelona / 6 / **15**; **2** / (Germany) Bayer Leverkusen / **6** / **12**; 3 / (France) Lyon / 6 / **9**; 4 / (Turkey) Fenerbahçe / 6 / **0**; Source: RSSSF				Final standings	**Group A winners**: Pos / Team / Pld / Pts; **1** / (Spain) Real Madrid / **6** / **13**; 2 / (Italy) Roma / 6 / **9**; 3 / (Russia) Lokomotiv Moscow / 6 / **7**; 4 / (Belgium) Anderlecht / 6 / **3**; Source: RSSSF			
Opponent	Result			Second group stage	Opponent	Result		
(Italy) Juventus	0–4 (A)			Matchday 1	(Czech Republic) Sparta Prague	3–2 (A)		
(Spain) Deportivo La Coruña	3–0 (H)			Matchday 2	(Greece) Panathinaikos	3–0 (H)		
(England) Arsenal	1–1 (H)			Matchday 3	(Portugal) Porto	1–0 (H)		
(England) Arsenal	1–4 (A)			Matchday 4	(Portugal) Porto	2–1 (A)		
(Italy) Juventus	3–1 (H)			Matchday 5	(Czech Republic) Sparta Prague	3–0 (H)		
(Spain) Deportivo La Coruña	3–1 (A)			Matchday 6	(Greece) Panathinaikos	2–2 (A)		
**Group D winners**: Pos / Team / Pld / Pts; **1** / (Germany) Bayer Leverkusen / **6** / **10**; 2 / (Spain) Deportivo La Coruña / 6 / **10**; 3 / (England) Arsenal / 6 / **7**; 4 / (Italy) Juventus / 6 / **7**; Source: RSSSF				Final standings	**Group C winners**: Pos / Team / Pld / Pts; **1** / (Spain) Real Madrid / **6** / **16**; 2 / (Greece) Panathinaikos / 6 / **8**; 3 / (Czech Republic) Sparta Prague / 6 / **6**; 4 / (Portugal) Porto / 6 / **4**; Source: RSSSF			
Opponent	Agg.	1st leg	2nd leg	Knockout phase	Opponent	Agg.	1st leg	2nd leg
(England) Liverpool	4–3	0–1 (A)	4–2 (H)	Quarter-finals	(Germany) Bayern Munich	3–2	1–2 (A)	2–0 (H)
(England) Manchester United	3–3 (a)	2–2 (A)	1–1 (H)	Semi-finals	(Spain) Barcelona	3–1	2–0 (A)	1–1 (H)

== Match ==
=== Details ===
15 May 2002
19:45 UTC+1

Bayer Leverkusen (Germany)	1–2	(Spain) Real Madrid
Lúcio 14'	Report	Raúl 8'; Zidane 45'

Hampden Park, Glasgow
Attendance: 50,499
Referee: Urs Meier (Switzerland)

**Bayer Leverkusen**	**Real Madrid**

GK	1	(Germany) Hans-Jörg Butt
RB	26	(Germany) Zoltán Sebescen	(substituted off) 65'
CB	6	(Croatia) Boris Živković
CB	19	(Brazil) Lúcio	(substituted off) 90+1'
LB	35	(Argentina) Diego Placente
DM	28	(Germany) Carsten Ramelow (c)
RM	25	(Germany) Bernd Schneider
CM	13	(Germany) Michael Ballack
LM	23	(Germany) Thomas Brdarić	(substituted off) 39'
AM	10	(Turkey) Yıldıray Baştürk
CF	27	(Germany) Oliver Neuville
Substitutes:
GK	20	(Australia) Frank Juric
DF	47	(Germany) Thomas Kleine
MF	3	(Croatia) Marko Babić	(substituted on) 90+1'
MF	15	(Croatia) Jurica Vranješ
MF	33	(Germany) Anel Džaka
FW	9	(Germany) Ulf Kirsten	(substituted on) 65'
FW	12	(Bulgaria) Dimitar Berbatov	(substituted on) 39'
Manager:
(Germany) Klaus Toppmöller

GK	13	(Spain) César		(substituted off) 68'
RB	2	(Spain) Míchel Salgado	(yellow card) 45+2'
CB	4	(Spain) Fernando Hierro (c)
CB	6	(Spain) Iván Helguera
LB	3	(Brazil) Roberto Carlos	(yellow card) 89'
DM	24	(France) Claude Makélélé		(substituted off) 73'
RM	10	(Portugal) Luís Figo		(substituted off) 61'
LM	21	(Argentina) Santiago Solari
AM	5	(France) Zinedine Zidane
CF	7	(Spain) Raúl
CF	9	(Spain) Fernando Morientes
Substitutes:
GK	1	(Spain) Iker Casillas		(substituted on) 68'
DF	18	(Spain) Aitor Karanka
DF	31	(Spain) Francisco Pavón
MF	8	(England) Steve McManaman		(substituted on) 61'
MF	14	(Spain) Guti
MF	16	(Brazil) Flávio Conceição		(substituted on) 73'
FW	23	(Spain) Pedro Munitis
Manager:
(Spain) Vicente del Bosque

Man of the Match:
Zinedine Zidane (Real Madrid)

Assistant referees:
Francesco Buragina (Switzerland)
Felix Züger (Switzerland)
Fourth official:
Massimo Busacca (Switzerland)

**Match rules**

- 90 minutes
- 30 minutes of golden goal extra time if necessary
- Penalty shoot-out if scores still level
- Seven named substitutes
- Maximum of three substitutes

=== Statistics ===
First half
Statistic	Bayer Leverkusen	Real Madrid
Goals scored	1	2
Total shots	5	5
Shots on target	3	3
Ball possession	46%	54%
Corner kicks	3	0
Fouls committed	8	16
Offsides	3	2
Yellow cards	0	1
Red cards	0	0

Second half
Statistic	Bayer Leverkusen	Real Madrid
Goals scored	0	0
Total shots	8	2
Shots on target	3	1
Ball possession	58%	42%
Corner kicks	3	0
Fouls committed	9	15
Offsides	0	0
Yellow cards	0	1
Red cards	0	0

Overall
Statistic	Bayer Leverkusen	Real Madrid
Goals scored	1	2
Total shots	13	7
Shots on target	6	4
Ball possession	52%	48%
Corner kicks	6	0
Fouls committed	17	31
Offsides	3	2
Yellow cards	0	2
Red cards	0	0

== Post-match ==
In the 2001–02 season, Bayer Leverkusen finished second in the Bundesliga and lost in the 2002 DFB-Pokal Final. After the match, Leverkusen manager Klaus Toppmöller expressed his disappointment on finishing this strong season without a title, stating: "the disappointment is huge – you don't always get the rewards you deserve in football, and no-one knows that better than us after what we have been through. We must seek consolation. Doing what we have done means we have had a very good season – but what has happened to us is difficult and makes us feel bitter."

Five Leverkusen players, Michael Ballack, Hans-Jörg Butt, Oliver Neuville, Carsten Ramelow, and Bernd Schneider went on to add a fourth silver medal at the 2002 FIFA World Cup. However, the gold medal-winning Brazil squad also included a Leverkusen player in Lúcio.

== See also ==
- 2002 UEFA Cup final
- 2002 UEFA Super Cup
- 2002 UEFA Women's Cup final
- 2002 Intercontinental Cup
- 2001–02 Bayer 04 Leverkusen season
- 2001–02 Real Madrid CF season
- Bayer 04 Leverkusen in European football
- Real Madrid CF in international football competitions
