= 2001–02 UEFA Champions League =

European football tournament

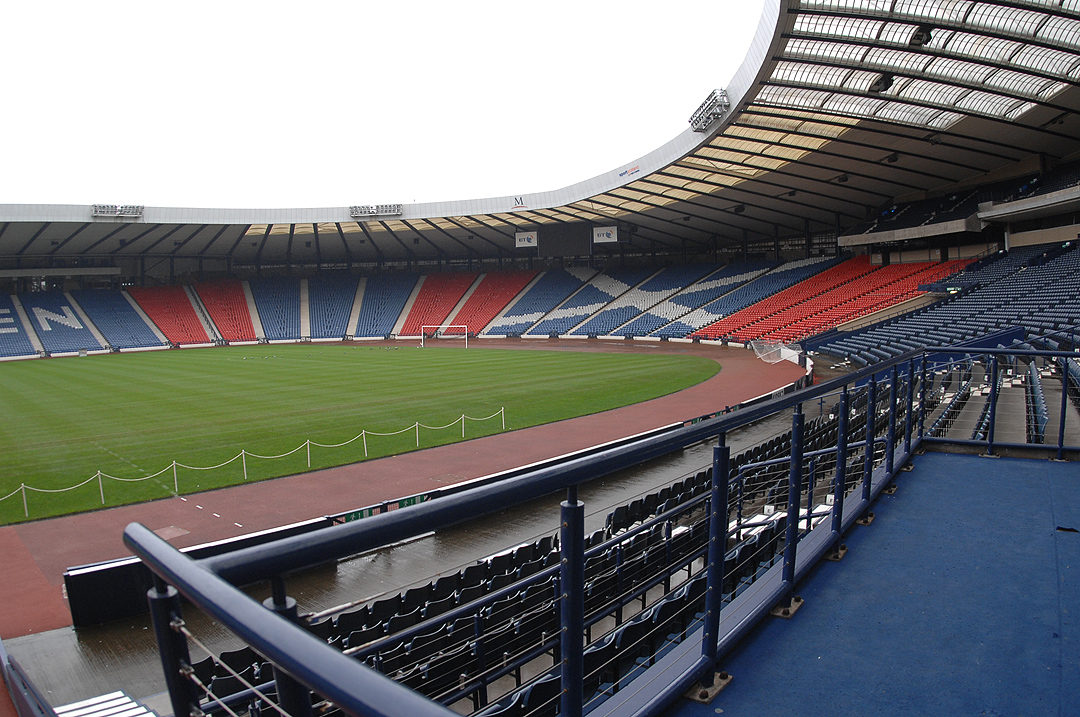
- Hampden Park in Glasgow, Scotland held the final

Tournament details
- Dates: Qualifying: 11 July – 8 September 2001; Competition proper: 11 September 2001 – 15 May 2002
- Teams: Competition proper: 32; Total: 72

Final positions
- Champions: (Spain) Real Madrid (9th title)
- Runners-up: (Germany) Bayer Leverkusen

Tournament statistics
- Matches played: 157
- Goals scored: 393 (2.5 per match)
- Attendance: 5,411,714 (34,470 per match)
- Top scorer(s): Ruud van Nistelrooy (Manchester United); 10 goals

The 2001–02 UEFA Champions League was the 47th season of the UEFA Champions League, UEFA's premier club football tournament, and the 10th since its rebranding from the "European Champion Clubs' Cup" or "European Cup". The tournament was won by Real Madrid, who beat Bayer Leverkusen in the final to claim their ninth European Cup title. The final's winning goal was scored by Zinedine Zidane, with a left-footed volley from the edge of the penalty area into the top left corner.

Bayer Leverkusen eliminated all three English teams on their way to the final: Arsenal in the second group stage, followed by Liverpool in the quarter-finals and Manchester United in the semi-finals.

Manchester United striker Ruud van Nistelrooy was the tournament's top scorer, scoring 10 goals from the first group stage through to the semi-final.

Bayern Munich were the defending champions, but were eliminated by eventual winners Real Madrid in the quarter-finals.

== Association team allocation ==
A total of 72 teams participated in the 2001–02 Champions League, from 48 of 51 UEFA associations. Liechtenstein (who don't have their own league) as well as lowest-ranked associations (Andorra and San Marino) were not admitted.

Below is the qualification scheme for the 2001–02 UEFA Champions League:

- Associations 1–3 each have four teams qualify
- Associations 4–6 each have three teams qualify
- Associations 7–15 each have two teams qualify
- Associations 16–49 each have one team qualify (except Liechtenstein)

=== Association ranking ===
Countries are allocated places according to their 2000 UEFA league coefficient, which takes into account their performance in European competitions from 1995–96 to 1999–2000.

| Rank | Association | Coeff. | Teams |
|---|---|---|---|
| 1 | Spain | 59.599 | 4 |
| 2 | Italy | 55.927 | 4 |
| 3 | Germany | 46.403 | 4 |
| 4 | France | 42.727 | 3 |
| 5 | England | 41.455 | 3 |
| 6 | Netherlands | 36.666 | 3 |
| 7 | Russia | 29.275 | 2 |
| 8 | Czech Republic | 29.124 | 2 |
| 9 | Greece | 28.866 | 2 |
| 10 | Portugal | 24.549 | 2 |
| 11 | Turkey | 23.850 | 2 |
| 12 | Ukraine | 23.166 | 2 |
| 13 | Norway | 22.100 | 2 |
| 14 | Switzerland | 21.000 | 2 |
| 15 | Scotland | 20.500 | 2 |
| 16 | Austria | 20.500 | 1 |
| 17 | Belgium | 19.050 | 1 |

| Rank | Association | Coeff. | Teams |
|---|---|---|---|
| 18 | Denmark | 18.175 | 1 |
| 19 | Poland | 18.000 | 1 |
| 20 | Romania | 17.833 | 1 |
| 21 | Croatia | 16.124 | 1 |
| 22 | Sweden | 15.533 | 1 |
| 23 | Hungary | 15.416 | 1 |
| 24 | Israel | 13.541 | 1 |
| 25 | Slovakia | 12.832 | 1 |
| 26 | Slovenia | 11.831 | 1 |
| 27 | Cyprus | 11.498 | 1 |
| 28 | FR Yugoslavia | 11.415 | 1 |
| 29 | Bulgaria | 10.540 | 1 |
| 30 | Georgia | 9.666 | 1 |
| 31 | Latvia | 8.332 | 1 |
| 32 | Finland | 8.041 | 1 |
| 33 | Belarus | 7.583 | 1 |
| 34 | Moldova | 6.333 | 1 |

| Rank | Association | Coeff. | Teams |
|---|---|---|---|
| 35 | Iceland | 6.332 | 1 |
| 36 | Macedonia | 5.081 | 1 |
| 37 | Lithuania | 4.665 | 1 |
| 38 | Estonia | 2.582 | 1 |
| 39 | Wales | 2.332 | 1 |
| 40 | Armenia | 2.249 | 1 |
| 41 | Republic of Ireland | 1.665 | 1 |
| 42 | Malta | 1.498 | 1 |
| 43 | Northern Ireland | 1.498 | 1 |
| 44 | Faroe Islands | 1.415 | 1 |
| 45 | Luxembourg | 1.332 | 1 |
| 46 | Azerbaijan | 1.249 | 1 |
| 47 | Liechtenstein | 1.000 | 0 |
| 48 | Albania | 0.832 | 1 |
| 49 | Bosnia and Herzegovina | 0.500 | 1 |
| 50 | Andorra | 0.000 | 0 |
| 51 | San Marino | 0.000 | 0 |

=== Distribution ===
Since the title holders (Bayern Munich) qualified for the Champions League group stage through their domestic league, the group stage spot reserved for the title holders was vacated. The following changes to the default access list are made:

- The champions of association 10 (Portugal) are promoted from the third qualifying round to the group stage.
- The champions of association 16 (Austria) are promoted from the second qualifying round to the third qualifying round.
- The champions of associations 27 and 28 (Cyprus and FR Yugoslavia) are promoted from the first qualifying round to the second qualifying round.

| | Teams entering in this round | Teams advancing from previous round |
|---|---|---|
| First qualifying round (20 teams) | 20 champions from associations 29–49 (except Liechtenstein) | |
| Second qualifying round (28 teams) | 12 champions from associations 17–28; 6 runners-up from associations 10–15 | 10 winners from the first qualifying round |
| Third qualifying round (32 teams) | 6 champions from associations 11–16; 3 runners-up from associations 7–9; 6 third-place finishers from associations 1–6; 3 fourth-place finishers from associations 1–3 | 14 winners from the second qualifying round |
| Group stage (32 teams) | 10 champions from associations 1–10 (including title holders Bayern Munich); 6 runners-up from associations 1–6 | 16 winners from the third qualifying round |
| Second group stage (16 teams) | | 8 group winners from the first group stage; 8 group runners-up from the first group stage |
| Knockout phase (8 teams) | | 4 group winners from the second group stage; 4 group runners-up from the second group stage |

=== Teams ===
League positions of the previous season shown in parentheses (TH: Champions League title holders).

Group stage
| (Spain) Real Madrid (1st) | (Germany) Bayern Munich (1st)^{TH} | (England) Manchester United (1st) | (Russia) Spartak Moscow (1st) |
| (Spain) Deportivo La Coruña (2nd) | (Germany) Schalke 04 (2nd) | (England) Arsenal (2nd) | (Czech Republic) Sparta Prague (1st) |
| (Italy) Roma (1st) | (France) Nantes (1st) | (Netherlands) PSV Eindhoven (1st) | (Greece) Olympiacos (1st) |
| (Italy) Juventus (2nd) | (France) Lyon (2nd) | (Netherlands) Feyenoord (2nd) | (Portugal) Boavista (1st) |
Third qualifying round
| (Spain) Mallorca (3rd) | (Germany) Bayer Leverkusen (4th) | (Czech Republic) Slavia Prague (2nd) | (Norway) Rosenborg (1st) |
| (Spain) Barcelona (4th) | (France) Lille (3rd) | (Greece) Panathinaikos (2nd) | (Switzerland) Grasshopper (1st) |
| (Italy) Lazio (3rd) | (England) Liverpool (3rd) | (Turkey) Fenerbahçe (1st) | (Scotland) Celtic (1st) |
| (Italy) Parma (4th) | (Netherlands) Ajax (3rd) | (Ukraine) Dynamo Kyiv (1st) | (Austria) Tirol Innsbruck (1st) |
| (Germany) Borussia Dortmund (3rd) | (Russia) Lokomotiv Moscow (2nd) | | |
Second qualifying round
| (Portugal) Porto (2nd) | (Scotland) Rangers (2nd) | (Croatia) Hajduk Split (1st) | (Slovakia) Inter Slovnaft Bratislava (1st) |
| (Turkey) Galatasaray (2nd) | (Belgium) Anderlecht (1st) | (Sweden) Halmstads BK (1st) | (Slovenia) Maribor (1st) |
| (Ukraine) Shakhtar Donetsk (2nd) | (Denmark) Copenhagen (1st) | (Hungary) Ferencváros (1st) | (Cyprus) Omonia (1st) |
| (Norway) Brann (2nd) | (Poland) Wisła Kraków (1st) | (Israel) Maccabi Haifa (1st) | (Federal Republic of Yugoslavia) Red Star Belgrade (1st) |
| (Switzerland) Lugano (2nd) | (Romania) Steaua București (1st) | | |
First qualifying round
| (Bulgaria) Levski Sofia (1st) | (Moldova) Sheriff Tiraspol (1st) | (Wales) Barry Town (1st) | (Faroe Islands) VB (1st) |
| (Georgia (country)) Torpedo Kutaisi (1st) | (Iceland) KR (1st) | (Armenia) Araks-Impeks (1st) | (Luxembourg) F91 Dudelange (1st) |
| (Latvia) Skonto (1st) | (North Macedonia) Sloga Jugomagnat (1st) | (Republic of Ireland) Bohemians (1st) | (Azerbaijan) Shamkir (1st) |
| (Finland) Haka (1st) | (Lithuania) Kaunas (1st) | (Malta) Valletta (1st) | (Albania) Vllaznia (1st) |
| (Belarus) Slavia Mozyr (1st) | (Estonia) Levadia Maardu (1st) | (Northern Ireland) Linfield (1st) | (Bosnia and Herzegovina) Željezničar (1st) |

Notes

1. Armenia (ARM): Armenian Premier League winners Araks Ararat had their rights sold to Araks-Impeks. Thus, Araks-Impeks took Armenia's spot in the Champions League.

== Round and draw dates ==
The schedule of the competition was as follows (all draws were held at UEFA headquarters in Nyon, Switzerland, unless stated otherwise).

| Phase | Round | Draw date | First leg | Second leg |
|---|---|---|---|---|
| Qualifying | First qualifying round | 22 June 2001 (Geneva) | 11 July 2001 | 18 July 2001 |
| Qualifying | Second qualifying round | 22 June 2001 (Geneva) | 24–25 July 2001 | 31 July – 1 August 2001 |
| Qualifying | Third qualifying round | 20 July 2001 | 7–8 August 2001 | 21–22 August 2001 |
| First group stage | Matchday 1 | 23 August 2001 (Monaco) | 11 September & 10 October 2001 (Note: All 8 games originally scheduled on 12 September 2001 were postponed to 10 October following the September 11 attacks; matches played on 11 September were allowed to continue and be completed.) | |
| First group stage | Matchday 2 | 23 August 2001 (Monaco) | 18–19 September 2001 | |
| First group stage | Matchday 3 | 23 August 2001 (Monaco) | 25–26 September 2001 | |
| First group stage | Matchday 4 | 23 August 2001 (Monaco) | 16–17 October 2001 | |
| First group stage | Matchday 5 | 23 August 2001 (Monaco) | 23–24 October 2001 | |
| First group stage | Matchday 6 | 23 August 2001 (Monaco) | 30–31 October 2001 | |
| Second group stage | Matchday 1 | 2 November 2001 (Geneva) | 20–21 November 2001 | |
| Second group stage | Matchday 2 | 2 November 2001 (Geneva) | 4–5 December 2001 | |
| Second group stage | Matchday 3 | 2 November 2001 (Geneva) | 19–20 February 2002 | |
| Second group stage | Matchday 4 | 2 November 2001 (Geneva) | 26–27 February 2002 | |
| Second group stage | Matchday 5 | 2 November 2001 (Geneva) | 12–13 March 2002 | |
| Second group stage | Matchday 6 | 2 November 2001 (Geneva) | 19–20 March 2002 | |
| Knockout phase | Quarter-finals | 22 March 2002 | 2–3 April 2002 | 9–10 April 2002 |
| Knockout phase | Semi-finals | 22 March 2002 | 23–24 April 2002 | 30 April – 1 May 2002 |
| Knockout phase | Final | 22 March 2002 | 15 May 2002 at Hampden Park, Glasgow | |

== Qualifying rounds ==
=== First qualifying round ===
| Team 1 | Agg. | Team 2 | 1st leg | 2nd leg |
|---|---|---|---|---|
| Araks-Impeks (Armenia) | 0–3 | (Moldova) Sheriff Tiraspol | 0–1 | 0–2 |
| Linfield (Northern Ireland) | 0–1 | (Georgia (country)) Torpedo Kutaisi | 0–0 | 0–1 |
| Bohemians (Republic of Ireland) | 3–0 | (Estonia) Levadia Maardu | 3–0 | 0–0 |
| F91 Dudelange (Luxembourg) | 2–6 | (Latvia) Skonto | 1–6 | 1–0 |
| Levski Sofia (Bulgaria) | 4–0 | (Bosnia and Herzegovina) Željezničar | 4–0 | 0–0 |
| VB (Faroe Islands) | 0–5 | (Belarus) Slavia Mozyr | 0–0 | 0–5 |
| Valletta (Malta) | 0–5 | (Finland) Haka | 0–0 | 0–5 |
| Sloga Jugomagnat (North Macedonia) | 1–1 (a) | (Lithuania) Kaunas | 0–0 | 1–1 |
| KR (Iceland) | 2–2 (a) | (Albania) Vllaznia | 2–1 | 0–1 |
| Barry Town (Wales) | 3–0 | (Azerbaijan) Shamkir | 2–0 | 1–0 |

=== Second qualifying round ===
| Team 1 | Agg. | Team 2 | 1st leg | 2nd leg |
|---|---|---|---|---|
| Haka (Finland) | 3–1 | (Israel) Maccabi Haifa | 0–1 | 3–0 (Note: UEFA awarded Haka a 3–0 win due to Maccabi Haifa fielding suspended player Walid Badir in the second leg. The original match had ended in a 4–0 win for Maccabi Haifa.) |
| Shakhtar Donetsk (Ukraine) | 4–2 | (Switzerland) Lugano | 3–0 | 1–2 |
| Omonia (Cyprus) | 2–3 | (Federal Republic of Yugoslavia) Red Star Belgrade | 1–1 | 1–2 |
| Ferencváros (Hungary) | 0–0 (4–5 p) | (Croatia) Hajduk Split | 0–0 | 0–0 (a.e.t.) |
| Porto (Portugal) | 9–3 | (Wales) Barry Town | 8–0 | 1–3 |
| Maribor (Slovenia) | 1–6 | (Scotland) Rangers | 0–3 | 1–3 |
| Galatasaray (Turkey) | 6–1 | (Albania) Vllaznia | 2–0 | 4–1 |
| Slavia Mozyr (Belarus) | 0–2 | (Slovakia) Inter Slovnaft Bratislava | 0–1 | 0–1 |
| Anderlecht (Belgium) | 6–1 | (Moldova) Sheriff Tiraspol | 4–0 | 2–1 |
| Torpedo Kutaisi (Georgia (country)) | 2–4 | (Denmark) Copenhagen | 1–1 | 1–3 |
| Levski Sofia (Bulgaria) | 1–1 (a) | (Norway) Brann | 0–0 | 1–1 |
| Skonto (Latvia) | 1–3 | (Poland) Wisła Kraków | 1–2 | 0–1 |
| Bohemians (Republic of Ireland) | 1–4 | (Sweden) Halmstads BK | 1–2 | 0–2 |
| Steaua București (Romania) | 5–1 | (North Macedonia) Sloga Jugomagnat | 3–0 | 2–1 |

=== Third qualifying round ===
| Team 1 | Agg. | Team 2 | 1st leg | 2nd leg |
|---|---|---|---|---|
| Shakhtar Donetsk (Ukraine) | 1–5 | (Germany) Borussia Dortmund | 0–2 | 1–3 |
| Lokomotiv Moscow (Russia) | 3–2 | (Austria) Tirol Innsbruck | 3–1 | 0–1 (Note: UEFA decided to replay the second leg (which originally ended in 1–0 win to Lokomotiv) after accepting Tirol's protest on refereeing mistake, which resulted in Lokomotiv player not being shown a red card after receiving a second yellow card.) |
| Steaua București (Romania) | 3–5 | (Ukraine) Dynamo Kyiv | 2–4 | 1–1 |
| Haka (Finland) | 1–9 | (England) Liverpool | 0–5 | 1–4 |
| Hajduk Split (Croatia) | 1–2 | (Spain) Mallorca | 1–0 | 0–2 (a.e.t.) |
| Red Star Belgrade (Federal Republic of Yugoslavia) | 0–3 | (Germany) Bayer Leverkusen | 0–0 | 0–3 |
| Wisła Kraków (Poland) | 3–5 | (Spain) Barcelona | 3–4 | 0–1 |
| Copenhagen (Denmark) | 3–5 | (Italy) Lazio | 2–1 | 1–4 |
| Inter Slovnaft Bratislava (Slovakia) | 3–7 | (Norway) Rosenborg | 3–3 | 0–4 |
| Halmstads BK (Sweden) | 3–4 | (Belgium) Anderlecht | 2–3 | 1–1 |
| Slavia Prague (Czech Republic) | 1–3 | (Greece) Panathinaikos | 1–2 | 0–1 |
| Galatasaray (Turkey) | 3–2 | (Bulgaria) Levski Sofia | 2–1 | 1–1 |
| Ajax (Netherlands) | 2–3 | (Scotland) Celtic | 1–3 | 1–0 |
| Porto (Portugal) | 5–4 | (Switzerland) Grasshopper | 2–2 | 3–2 |
| Parma (Italy) | 1–2 | (France) Lille | 0–2 | 1–0 |
| Rangers (Scotland) | 1–2 | (Turkey) Fenerbahçe | 0–0 | 1–2 |

== First group stage ==
Location of teams of the 2001–02 UEFA Champions League first group stage.
Brown: Group A; Red: Group B; Orange: Group C; Yellow: Group D;
Green: Group E; Blue: Group F; Purple: Group G; Pink: Group H.

16 winners from the third qualifying round, 10 champions from countries ranked 1–10, and six second-placed teams from countries ranked 1–6 were drawn into eight groups of four teams each. The top two teams in each group advance to the second group stage, and the third placed team in each group advance to the Third Round of the UEFA Cup.

Celtic, Lille, Liverpool, Lokomotiv Moscow, Mallorca, Roma and Schalke 04 made their debut in the group stage.

=== Group A ===
| Pos | Team | Pld | W | D | L | GF | GA | GD | Pts | Qualification | RMA | ROM | LMO | AND |
|---|---|---|---|---|---|---|---|---|---|---|---|---|---|---|
| 1 | (Spain) Real Madrid | 6 | 4 | 1 | 1 | 13 | 5 | +8 | 13 | Advance to second group stage | — | 1–1 | 4–0 | 4–1 |
| 2 | (Italy) Roma | 6 | 2 | 3 | 1 | 6 | 5 | +1 | 9 | Advance to second group stage | 1–2 | — | 2–1 | 1–1 |
| 3 | (Russia) Lokomotiv Moscow | 6 | 2 | 1 | 3 | 9 | 9 | 0 | 7 | Transfer to UEFA Cup | 2–0 | 0–1 | — | 1–1 |
| 4 | (Belgium) Anderlecht | 6 | 0 | 3 | 3 | 4 | 13 | −9 | 3 | | 0–2 | 0–0 | 1–5 | — |

Source: RSSSF

=== Group B ===
| Pos | Team | Pld | W | D | L | GF | GA | GD | Pts | Qualification | LIV | BOA | DOR | DKV |
|---|---|---|---|---|---|---|---|---|---|---|---|---|---|---|
| 1 | (England) Liverpool | 6 | 3 | 3 | 0 | 7 | 3 | +4 | 12 | Advance to second group stage | — | 1–1 | 2–0 | 1–0 |
| 2 | (Portugal) Boavista | 6 | 2 | 2 | 2 | 8 | 7 | +1 | 8 | Advance to second group stage | 1–1 | — | 2–1 | 3–1 |
| 3 | (Germany) Borussia Dortmund | 6 | 2 | 2 | 2 | 6 | 7 | −1 | 8 | Transfer to UEFA Cup | 0–0 | 2–1 | — | 1–0 |
| 4 | (Ukraine) Dynamo Kyiv | 6 | 1 | 1 | 4 | 5 | 9 | −4 | 4 | | 1–2 | 1–0 | 2–2 | — |

Source: RSSSF

=== Group C ===
| Pos | Team | Pld | W | D | L | GF | GA | GD | Pts | Qualification | PAN | ARS | MLL | SCH |
|---|---|---|---|---|---|---|---|---|---|---|---|---|---|---|
| 1 | (Greece) Panathinaikos | 6 | 4 | 0 | 2 | 8 | 3 | +5 | 12 | Advance to second group stage | — | 1–0 | 2–0 | 2–0 |
| 2 | (England) Arsenal | 6 | 3 | 0 | 3 | 9 | 9 | 0 | 9 | Advance to second group stage | 2–1 | — | 3–1 | 3–2 |
| 3 | (Spain) Mallorca | 6 | 3 | 0 | 3 | 4 | 9 | −5 | 9 | Transfer to UEFA Cup | 1–0 | 1–0 | — | 0–4 |
| 4 | (Germany) Schalke 04 | 6 | 2 | 0 | 4 | 9 | 9 | 0 | 6 | | 0–2 | 3–1 | 0–1 | — |

Source: RSSSF

=== Group D ===
| Pos | Team | Pld | W | D | L | GF | GA | GD | Pts | Qualification | NAN | GAL | PSV | LAZ |
|---|---|---|---|---|---|---|---|---|---|---|---|---|---|---|
| 1 | (France) Nantes | 6 | 3 | 2 | 1 | 8 | 3 | +5 | 11 | Advance to second group stage | — | 0–1 | 4–1 | 1–0 |
| 2 | (Turkey) Galatasaray | 6 | 3 | 1 | 2 | 5 | 4 | +1 | 10 | Advance to second group stage | 0–0 | — | 2–0 | 1–0 |
| 3 | (Netherlands) PSV Eindhoven | 6 | 2 | 1 | 3 | 6 | 9 | −3 | 7 | Transfer to UEFA Cup | 0–0 | 3–1 | — | 1–0 |
| 4 | (Italy) Lazio | 6 | 2 | 0 | 4 | 4 | 7 | −3 | 6 | | 1–3 | 1–0 | 2–1 | — |

Source: RSSSF

=== Group E ===
| Pos | Team | Pld | W | D | L | GF | GA | GD | Pts | Qualification | JUV | POR | CEL | ROS |
|---|---|---|---|---|---|---|---|---|---|---|---|---|---|---|
| 1 | (Italy) Juventus | 6 | 3 | 2 | 1 | 11 | 8 | +3 | 11 | Advance to second group stage | — | 3–1 | 3–2 | 1–0 |
| 2 | (Portugal) Porto | 6 | 3 | 1 | 2 | 7 | 5 | +2 | 10 | Advance to second group stage | 0–0 | — | 3–0 | 1–0 |
| 3 | (Scotland) Celtic | 6 | 3 | 0 | 3 | 8 | 11 | −3 | 9 | Transfer to UEFA Cup | 4–3 | 1–0 | — | 1–0 |
| 4 | (Norway) Rosenborg | 6 | 1 | 1 | 4 | 4 | 6 | −2 | 4 | | 1–1 | 1–2 | 2–0 | — |

Source: RSSSF

=== Group F ===
| Pos | Team | Pld | W | D | L | GF | GA | GD | Pts | Qualification | BAR | LEV | LYO | FEN |
|---|---|---|---|---|---|---|---|---|---|---|---|---|---|---|
| 1 | (Spain) Barcelona | 6 | 5 | 0 | 1 | 12 | 5 | +7 | 15 | Advance to second group stage | — | 2–1 | 2–0 | 1–0 |
| 2 | (Germany) Bayer Leverkusen | 6 | 4 | 0 | 2 | 10 | 9 | +1 | 12 | Advance to second group stage | 2–1 | — | 2–4 | 2–1 |
| 3 | (France) Lyon | 6 | 3 | 0 | 3 | 10 | 9 | +1 | 9 | Transfer to UEFA Cup | 2–3 | 0–1 | — | 3–1 |
| 4 | (Turkey) Fenerbahçe | 6 | 0 | 0 | 6 | 3 | 12 | −9 | 0 | | 0–3 | 1–2 | 0–1 | — |

Source: RSSSF

=== Group G ===
| Pos | Team | Pld | W | D | L | GF | GA | GD | Pts | Qualification | DEP | MUN | LIL | OLY |
|---|---|---|---|---|---|---|---|---|---|---|---|---|---|---|
| 1 | (Spain) Deportivo La Coruña | 6 | 2 | 4 | 0 | 10 | 8 | +2 | 10 | Advance to second group stage | — | 2–1 | 1–1 | 2–2 |
| 2 | (England) Manchester United | 6 | 3 | 1 | 2 | 10 | 6 | +4 | 10 | Advance to second group stage | 2–3 | — | 1–0 | 3–0 |
| 3 | (France) Lille | 6 | 1 | 3 | 2 | 7 | 7 | 0 | 6 | Transfer to UEFA Cup | 1–1 | 1–1 | — | 3–1 |
| 4 | (Greece) Olympiacos | 6 | 1 | 2 | 3 | 6 | 12 | −6 | 5 | | 1–1 | 0–2 | 2–1 | — |

Source: RSSSF

=== Group H ===
| Pos | Team | Pld | W | D | L | GF | GA | GD | Pts | Qualification | BAY | SPP | FEY | SPM |
|---|---|---|---|---|---|---|---|---|---|---|---|---|---|---|
| 1 | (Germany) Bayern Munich | 6 | 4 | 2 | 0 | 14 | 5 | +9 | 14 | Advance to second group stage | — | 0–0 | 3–1 | 5–1 |
| 2 | (Czech Republic) Sparta Prague | 6 | 3 | 2 | 1 | 10 | 3 | +7 | 11 | Advance to second group stage | 0–1 | — | 4–0 | 2–0 |
| 3 | (Netherlands) Feyenoord | 6 | 1 | 2 | 3 | 7 | 14 | −7 | 5 | Transfer to UEFA Cup | 2–2 | 0–2 | — | 2–1 |
| 4 | (Russia) Spartak Moscow | 6 | 0 | 2 | 4 | 7 | 16 | −9 | 2 | | 1–3 | 2–2 | 2–2 | — |

Source: RSSSF

== Second group stage ==
Eight winners and eight runners-up from the first group stage were drawn into four groups of four teams each, each containing two group winners and two runners-up. Teams from the same country or from the same first round group could not be drawn together. The top two teams in each group advanced to the quarter-finals.

=== Group A ===
| Pos | Team | Pld | W | D | L | GF | GA | GD | Pts | Qualification | MUN | BAY | BOA | NAN |
|---|---|---|---|---|---|---|---|---|---|---|---|---|---|---|
| 1 | (England) Manchester United | 6 | 3 | 3 | 0 | 13 | 3 | +10 | 12 | Advance to knockout stage | — | 0–0 | 3–0 | 5–1 |
| 2 | (Germany) Bayern Munich | 6 | 3 | 3 | 0 | 5 | 2 | +3 | 12 | Advance to knockout stage | 1–1 | — | 1–0 | 2–1 |
| 3 | (Portugal) Boavista | 6 | 1 | 2 | 3 | 2 | 8 | −6 | 5 | | 0–3 | 0–0 | — | 1–0 |
| 4 | (France) Nantes | 6 | 0 | 2 | 4 | 4 | 11 | −7 | 2 | | 1–1 | 0–1 | 1–1 | — |

Source: RSSSF

=== Group B ===
| Pos | Team | Pld | W | D | L | GF | GA | GD | Pts | Qualification | BAR | LIV | ROM | GAL |
|---|---|---|---|---|---|---|---|---|---|---|---|---|---|---|
| 1 | (Spain) Barcelona | 6 | 2 | 3 | 1 | 7 | 7 | 0 | 9 | Advance to knockout stage | — | 0–0 | 1–1 | 2–2 |
| 2 | (England) Liverpool | 6 | 1 | 4 | 1 | 4 | 4 | 0 | 7 | Advance to knockout stage | 1–3 | — | 2–0 | 0–0 |
| 3 | (Italy) Roma | 6 | 1 | 4 | 1 | 6 | 5 | +1 | 7 | | 3–0 | 0–0 | — | 1–1 |
| 4 | (Turkey) Galatasaray | 6 | 0 | 5 | 1 | 5 | 6 | −1 | 5 | | 0–1 | 1–1 | 1–1 | — |

Source: RSSSF

=== Group C ===
| Pos | Team | Pld | W | D | L | GF | GA | GD | Pts | Qualification | RMA | PAN | SPP | POR |
|---|---|---|---|---|---|---|---|---|---|---|---|---|---|---|
| 1 | (Spain) Real Madrid | 6 | 5 | 1 | 0 | 14 | 5 | +9 | 16 | Advance to knockout stage | — | 3–0 | 3–0 | 1–0 |
| 2 | (Greece) Panathinaikos | 6 | 2 | 2 | 2 | 7 | 8 | −1 | 8 | Advance to knockout stage | 2–2 | — | 2–1 | 0–0 |
| 3 | (Czech Republic) Sparta Prague | 6 | 2 | 0 | 4 | 6 | 10 | −4 | 6 | | 2–3 | 0–2 | — | 2–0 |
| 4 | (Portugal) Porto | 6 | 1 | 1 | 4 | 3 | 7 | −4 | 4 | | 1–2 | 2–1 | 0–1 | — |

Source: RSSSF

=== Group D ===
| Pos | Team | Pld | W | D | L | GF | GA | GD | Pts | Qualification | LEV | DEP | ARS | JUV |
|---|---|---|---|---|---|---|---|---|---|---|---|---|---|---|
| 1 | (Germany) Bayer Leverkusen | 6 | 3 | 1 | 2 | 11 | 11 | 0 | 10 | Advance to knockout stage | — | 3–0 | 1–1 | 3–1 |
| 2 | (Spain) Deportivo La Coruña | 6 | 3 | 1 | 2 | 7 | 6 | +1 | 10 | Advance to knockout stage | 1–3 | — | 2–0 | 2–0 |
| 3 | (England) Arsenal | 6 | 2 | 1 | 3 | 8 | 8 | 0 | 7 | | 4–1 | 0–2 | — | 3–1 |
| 4 | (Italy) Juventus | 6 | 2 | 1 | 3 | 7 | 8 | −1 | 7 | | 4–0 | 0–0 | 1–0 | — |

Source: RSSSF

== Knockout phase ==
=== Bracket ===
Quarter-finals
(Spain) Deportivo La Coruña | 0 | 2 | 2
(England) Manchester United | 2 | 3 | 5
(England) Liverpool | 1 | 2 | 3
(Germany) Bayer Leverkusen | 0 | 4 | 4
(Greece) Panathinaikos | 1 | 1 | 2
(Spain) Barcelona | 0 | 3 | 3
(Germany) Bayern Munich | 2 | 0 | 2
(Spain) Real Madrid | 1 | 2 | 3

Semi-finals
(England) Manchester United | 2 | 1 | 3
(Germany) Bayer Leverkusen (a) | 2 | 1 | 3
(Spain) Barcelona | 0 | 1 | 1
(Spain) Real Madrid | 2 | 1 | 3

Final
15 May – Glasgow
(Germany) Bayer Leverkusen | 1
(Spain) Real Madrid | 2

=== Quarter-finals ===
The first legs were played on 2 and 3 April, and the second legs were played on 9 and 10 April 2002.

| Team 1 | Agg. | Team 2 | 1st leg | 2nd leg |
|---|---|---|---|---|
| Panathinaikos (Greece) | 2–3 | (Spain) Barcelona | 1–0 | 1–3 |
| Bayern Munich (Germany) | 2–3 | (Spain) Real Madrid | 2–1 | 0–2 |
| Deportivo La Coruña (Spain) | 2–5 | (England) Manchester United | 0–2 | 2–3 |
| Liverpool (England) | 3–4 | (Germany) Bayer Leverkusen | 1–0 | 2–4 |

=== Semi-finals ===
The first legs were played on 23 and 24 April, and the second legs were played on 30 April and 1 May 2002.

| Team 1 | Agg. | Team 2 | 1st leg | 2nd leg |
|---|---|---|---|---|
| Barcelona (Spain) | 1–3 | (Spain) Real Madrid | 0–2 | 1–1 |
| Manchester United (England) | 3–3 (a) | (Germany) Bayer Leverkusen | 2–2 | 1–1 |

=== Final ===
The final was played on 15 May 2002 at Hampden Park in Glasgow, Scotland.

15 May 2002
19:45 UTC+1

| Bayer Leverkusen (Germany) | 1–2 | (Spain) Real Madrid |
|---|---|---|
| Lúcio 14' | Report | Raúl 8'; Zidane 45' |

Hampden Park, Glasgow
Attendance: 50,499
Referee: Urs Meier (Switzerland)

== Statistics ==
The top scorers from the 2001–02 UEFA Champions League (excluding qualifying rounds) are as follows:

=== Top goalscorers ===
| Rank | Name | Team | Goals | Appearances | Minutes played |
|---|---|---|---|---|---|
| 1 | (Netherlands) Ruud van Nistelrooy | (England) Manchester United | 10 | 14 | 1,207 |
| 2 | (France) David Trezeguet | (Italy) Juventus | 8 | 10 | 841 |
| 3 | (Norway) Ole Gunnar Solskjær | (England) Manchester United | 7 | 15 | 630 |
| 3 | (France) Thierry Henry | (England) Arsenal | 7 | 11 | 981 |
| 5 | (Brazil) Giovane Élber | (Germany) Bayern Munich | 6 | 11 | 730 |
| 5 | (Spain) Diego Tristán | (Spain) Deportivo La Coruña | 6 | 12 | 797 |
| 5 | (Cyprus) Michalis Konstantinou | (Greece) Panathinaikos | 6 | 14 | 955 |
| 5 | (Spain) Raúl | (Spain) Real Madrid | 6 | 12 | 1,080 |
| 5 | (Netherlands) Patrick Kluivert | (Spain) Barcelona | 6 | 15 | 1,300 |
| 5 | (Germany) Michael Ballack | (Germany) Bayer Leverkusen | 6 | 15 | 1,346 |

== See also ==
- 2001–02 UEFA Cup
- 2001 UEFA Intertoto Cup
- 2002 UEFA Super Cup
- 2002 Intercontinental Cup
- 2001–02 UEFA Women's Cup
