= 2001–02 UEFA Champions League second group stage =

Football competition

In the second group stage of the 2001–02 UEFA Champions League, eight winners and eight runners-up from the first group stage were drawn into four groups of four teams, each containing two group winners and two runners-up. Teams from the same country or from the same first round group could not be drawn together. The top two teams in each group advanced to the quarter-finals.

== Teams ==
Seeding was determined by the UEFA coefficients and participants' first group stage positions. Four best-ranked group winners were seeded in Pot 1, the remaining four in Pot 2. Group runners-up were seeded to Pots 3 and 4 accordingly.

Key to colours in group tables
Group winners and runners-up advance to the knockout stage

Pot 1 (higher-coefficient group winners)
| Team | Coeff. |
|---|---|
| (Germany) Bayern Munich | 110.316 |
| (Spain) Real Madrid | 114.605 |
| (Spain) Barcelona | 108.604 |
| (Italy) Juventus | 98.119 |

Pot 2 (lower-coefficient group winners)
| Team | Coeff. |
|---|---|
| (England) Liverpool | 73.643 |
| (Spain) Deportivo La Coruña | 63.605 |
| (France) Nantes | 45.176 |
| (Greece) Panathinaikos | 37.183 |

Pot 3 (higher-coefficient group runners-up)
| Team | Coeff. |
|---|---|
| (England) Manchester United | 110.644 |
| (England) Arsenal | 76.644 |
| (Turkey) Galatasaray | 71.987 |
| (Portugal) Porto | 68.136 |

Pot 4 (lower-coefficient group runners-up)
| Team | Coeff. |
|---|---|
| (Italy) Roma | 68.119 |
| (Germany) Bayer Leverkusen | 56.315 |
| (Czech Republic) Sparta Prague | 37.395 |
| (Portugal) Boavista | 28.137 |

Notes

1. ^{TH} Champions League title holders

== Tie-breaking criteria ==
Based on Article 7.06 in the UEFA regulations, if two or more teams are equal on points on completion of the group matches, the following criteria will be applied to determine the rankings:

1. higher number of points obtained in the group matches played among the teams in question;
2. superior goal difference from the group matches played among the teams in question;
3. higher number of goals scored away from home in the group matches played among the teams in question;
4. superior goal difference from all group matches played;
5. higher number of goals scored;
6. higher number of coefficient points accumulated by the club in question, as well as its association, over the previous five seasons.

== Groups ==
=== Group A ===
| Pos | Team | Pld | W | D | L | GF | GA | GD | Pts | Qualification | MUN | BAY | BOA | NAN |
|---|---|---|---|---|---|---|---|---|---|---|---|---|---|---|
| 1 | (England) Manchester United | 6 | 3 | 3 | 0 | 13 | 3 | +10 | 12 | Advance to knockout stage | — | 0–0 | 3–0 | 5–1 |
| 2 | (Germany) Bayern Munich | 6 | 3 | 3 | 0 | 5 | 2 | +3 | 12 | Advance to knockout stage | 1–1 | — | 1–0 | 2–1 |
| 3 | (Portugal) Boavista | 6 | 1 | 2 | 3 | 2 | 8 | −6 | 5 | | 0–3 | 0–0 | — | 1–0 |
| 4 | (France) Nantes | 6 | 0 | 2 | 4 | 4 | 11 | −7 | 2 | | 1–1 | 0–1 | 1–1 | — |

Source: RSSSF
20 November 2001
20:45

| Boavista (Portugal) | 1–0 | (France) Nantes |
|---|---|---|
| Sánchez 24' | Report |

Estádio do Bessa, Porto
Attendance: 7,700
Referee: Jan Wegereef (Netherlands)
20 November 2001
20:45

| Bayern Munich (Germany) | 1–1 | (England) Manchester United |
|---|---|---|
| Paulo Sérgio 87' | Report | Van Nistelrooy 74' |

Olympiastadion, Munich
Attendance: 59,000
Referee: Anders Frisk (Sweden)

5 December 2001
20:45

| Manchester United (England) | 3–0 | (Portugal) Boavista |
|---|---|---|
| Van Nistelrooy 31', 62'; Blanc 55' | Report |

Old Trafford, Manchester
Attendance: 66,274
Referee: Antonio Jesús López Nieto (Spain)
5 December 2001
20:45

| Nantes (France) | 0–1 | (Germany) Bayern Munich |
|---|---|---|
| | Report | Paulo Sérgio 65' |

Stade de la Beaujoire, Nantes
Attendance: 28,167
Referee: Pierluigi Collina (Italy)

20 February 2002
20:45

| Nantes (France) | 1–1 | (England) Manchester United |
|---|---|---|
| Moldovan 9' | Report | Van Nistelrooy 90+4' (pen.) |

Stade de la Beaujoire, Nantes
Attendance: 35,783
Referee: Kyros Vassaras (Greece)
20 February 2002
20:45

| Boavista (Portugal) | 0–0 | (Germany) Bayern Munich |
|---|---|---|
| | Report |

Estádio do Bessa, Porto
Attendance: 10,400
Referee: Ľuboš Micheľ (Slovakia)

26 February 2002
20:45

| Manchester United (England) | 5–1 | (France) Nantes |
|---|---|---|
| Beckham 18'; Solskjær 31', 78'; Silvestre 38'; Van Nistelrooy 64' (pen.) | Report | Da Rocha 17' |

Old Trafford, Manchester
Attendance: 66,492
Referee: Manuel Mejuto González (Spain)
26 February 2002
20:45

| Bayern Munich (Germany) | 1–0 | (Portugal) Boavista |
|---|---|---|
| Santa Cruz 81' | Report |

Olympiastadion, Munich
Attendance: 32,020
Referee: Terje Hauge (Norway)

13 March 2002
20:45

| Nantes (France) | 1–1 | (Portugal) Boavista |
|---|---|---|
| Moldovan 43' | Report | Martelinho 78' |

Stade de la Beaujoire, Nantes
Attendance: 26,929
Referee: Hugh Dallas (Scotland)
13 March 2002
20:45

| Manchester United (England) | 0–0 | (Germany) Bayern Munich |
|---|---|---|
| | Report |

Old Trafford, Manchester
Attendance: 66,818
Referee: Gilles Veissière (France)

19 March 2002
20:45

| Boavista (Portugal) | 0–3 | (England) Manchester United |
|---|---|---|
| | Report | Blanc 14'; Solskjær 29'; Beckham 51' (pen.) |

Estádio do Bessa, Porto
Attendance: 11,383
Referee: Konrad Plautz (Austria)
19 March 2002
20:45

| Bayern Munich (Germany) | 2–1 | (France) Nantes |
|---|---|---|
| Jeremies 58'; Pizarro 87' | Report | Ahamada 54' |

Olympiastadion, Munich
Attendance: 35,698
Referee: Knud Erik Fisker (Denmark)

=== Group B ===
| Pos | Team | Pld | W | D | L | GF | GA | GD | Pts | Qualification | BAR | LIV | ROM | GAL |
|---|---|---|---|---|---|---|---|---|---|---|---|---|---|---|
| 1 | (Spain) Barcelona | 6 | 2 | 3 | 1 | 7 | 7 | 0 | 9 | Advance to knockout stage | — | 0–0 | 1–1 | 2–2 |
| 2 | (England) Liverpool | 6 | 1 | 4 | 1 | 4 | 4 | 0 | 7 | Advance to knockout stage | 1–3 | — | 2–0 | 0–0 |
| 3 | (Italy) Roma | 6 | 1 | 4 | 1 | 6 | 5 | +1 | 7 | | 3–0 | 0–0 | — | 1–1 |
| 4 | (Turkey) Galatasaray | 6 | 0 | 5 | 1 | 5 | 6 | −1 | 5 | | 0–1 | 1–1 | 1–1 | — |

Source: RSSSF
20 November 2001
20:45

| Liverpool (England) | 1–3 | (Spain) Barcelona |
|---|---|---|
| Owen 27' | Report | Kluivert 41'; Rochemback 65'; Overmars 84' |

Anfield, Liverpool
Attendance: 41,521
Referee: Hellmut Krug (Germany)
20 November 2001
20:45

| Galatasaray (Turkey) | 1–1 | (Italy) Roma |
|---|---|---|
| Pérez 22' | Report | Emerson 90+2' |

Ali Sami Yen Stadium, Istanbul
Attendance: 15,794
Referee: Claude Colombo (France)

5 December 2001
20:45

| Roma (Italy) | 0–0 | (England) Liverpool |
|---|---|---|
| | Report |

Stadio Olimpico, Rome
Attendance: 58,721
Referee: Dick Jol (Netherlands)
5 December 2001
20:45

| Barcelona (Spain) | 2–2 | (Turkey) Galatasaray |
|---|---|---|
| Saviola 49', 66' | Report | Ümit Karan 5'; Fleurquin 41' |

Camp Nou, Barcelona
Attendance: 49,260
Referee: Markus Merk (Germany)

20 February 2002
20:45

| Barcelona (Spain) | 1–1 | (Italy) Roma |
|---|---|---|
| Kluivert 82' | Report | Panucci 57' |

Camp Nou, Barcelona
Attendance: 90,527
Referee: Gilles Veissière (France)
20 February 2002
20:45

| Liverpool (England) | 0–0 | (Turkey) Galatasaray |
|---|---|---|
| | Report |

Anfield, Liverpool
Attendance: 41,605
Referee: Vítor Melo Pereira (Portugal)

26 February 2002
20:45

| Roma (Italy) | 3–0 | (Spain) Barcelona |
|---|---|---|
| Emerson 61'; Montella 74'; Tommasi 90+2' | Report |

Stadio Olimpico, Rome
Attendance: 69,869
Referee: Kim Milton Nielsen (Denmark)
26 February 2002
20:45

| Galatasaray (Turkey) | 1–1 | (England) Liverpool |
|---|---|---|
| Niculescu 71' | Report | Heskey 79' |

Ali Sami Yen Stadium, Istanbul
Attendance: 20,600
Referee: Urs Meier (Switzerland)

13 March 2002
20:45

| Barcelona (Spain) | 0–0 | (England) Liverpool |
|---|---|---|
| | Report |

Camp Nou, Barcelona
Attendance: 83,441
Referee: Kyros Vassaras (Greece)
13 March 2002
20:45

| Roma (Italy) | 1–1 | (Turkey) Galatasaray |
|---|---|---|
| Cafu 52' | Report | Ümit Karan 45' |

Stadio Olimpico, Rome
Attendance: 58,630
Referee: Anders Frisk (Sweden)

19 March 2002
20:45

| Liverpool (England) | 2–0 | (Italy) Roma |
|---|---|---|
| Litmanen 7' (pen.); Heskey 64' | Report |

Anfield, Liverpool
Attendance: 41,794
Referee: Rune Pedersen (Norway)
19 March 2002
20:45

| Galatasaray (Turkey) | 0–1 | (Spain) Barcelona |
|---|---|---|
| | Report | Luis Enrique 58' |

Ali Sami Yen Stadium, Istanbul
Attendance: 21,011
Referee: René Temmink (Netherlands)

=== Group C ===
| Pos | Team | Pld | W | D | L | GF | GA | GD | Pts | Qualification | RMA | PAN | SPP | POR |
|---|---|---|---|---|---|---|---|---|---|---|---|---|---|---|
| 1 | (Spain) Real Madrid | 6 | 5 | 1 | 0 | 14 | 5 | +9 | 16 | Advance to knockout stage | — | 3–0 | 3–0 | 1–0 |
| 2 | (Greece) Panathinaikos | 6 | 2 | 2 | 2 | 7 | 8 | −1 | 8 | Advance to knockout stage | 2–2 | — | 2–1 | 0–0 |
| 3 | (Czech Republic) Sparta Prague | 6 | 2 | 0 | 4 | 6 | 10 | −4 | 6 | | 2–3 | 0–2 | — | 2–0 |
| 4 | (Portugal) Porto | 6 | 1 | 1 | 4 | 3 | 7 | −4 | 4 | | 1–2 | 2–1 | 0–1 | — |

Source: RSSSF
21 November 2001
20:45

| Sparta Prague (Czech Republic) | 2–3 | (Spain) Real Madrid |
|---|---|---|
| Michalík 30'; Sionko 72' | Report | Zidane 20'; Morientes 36', 74' |

AXA Arena, Prague
Attendance: 19,156
Referee: Stefano Braschi (Italy)
21 November 2001
20:45

| Panathinaikos (Greece) | 0–0 | (Portugal) Porto |
|---|---|---|
| | Report |

Leoforos Alexandras Stadium, Athens
Attendance: 15,208
Referee: Graham Poll (England)

4 December 2001
20:45

| Porto (Portugal) | 0–1 | (Czech Republic) Sparta Prague |
|---|---|---|
| | Report | Sionko 75' |

Estádio das Antas, Porto
Attendance: 25,766
Referee: Nikolai Levnikov (Russia)
4 December 2001
20:45

| Real Madrid (Spain) | 3–0 | (Greece) Panathinaikos |
|---|---|---|
| Helguera 41'; Raúl 66', 72' | Report |

Santiago Bernabéu, Madrid
Attendance: 52,300
Referee: Gilles Veissière (France)

19 February 2002
20:45

| Real Madrid (Spain) | 1–0 | (Portugal) Porto |
|---|---|---|
| Solari 83' | Report |

Santiago Bernabéu, Madrid
Attendance: 59,000
Referee: Markus Merk (Germany)
19 February 2002
20:45

| Sparta Prague (Czech Republic) | 0–2 | (Greece) Panathinaikos |
|---|---|---|
| | Report | Karagounis 39'; Konstantinou 71' |

AXA Arena, Prague
Attendance: 15,557
Referee: Stuart Dougal (Scotland)

27 February 2002
20:45

| Porto (Portugal) | 1–2 | (Spain) Real Madrid |
|---|---|---|
| Capucho 28' | Report | Solari 7'; Helguera 20' |

Estádio das Antas, Porto
Attendance: 34,700
Referee: Pierluigi Collina (Italy)
27 February 2002
20:45

| Panathinaikos (Greece) | 2–1 | (Czech Republic) Sparta Prague |
|---|---|---|
| Konstantinou 15', 47' | Report | Klein 90' |

Leoforos Alexandras Stadium, Athens
Attendance: 15,053
Referee: Knud Erik Fisker (Denmark)

12 March 2002
20:45

| Real Madrid (Spain) | 3–0 | (Czech Republic) Sparta Prague |
|---|---|---|
| Solari 60'; Guti 64'; Sávio 71' | Report |

Santiago Bernabéu, Madrid
Attendance: 41,312
Referee: Graham Poll (England)
12 March 2002
20:45

| Porto (Portugal) | 2–1 | (Greece) Panathinaikos |
|---|---|---|
| Deco 12'; Pena 54' | Report | Kolkka 65' |

Estádio das Antas, Porto
Attendance: 12,835
Referee: Ľuboš Micheľ (Slovakia)

20 March 2002
20:45

| Sparta Prague (Czech Republic) | 2–0 | (Portugal) Porto |
|---|---|---|
| Sionko 63'; Jarošík 71' | Report |

AXA Arena, Prague
Attendance: 10,521
Referee: Wolfgang Stark (Germany)
20 March 2002
20:45

| Panathinaikos (Greece) | 2–2 | (Spain) Real Madrid |
|---|---|---|
| Liberopoulos 9'; Goumas 64' | Report | Morientes 11'; Portillo 80' |

Leoforos Alexandras Stadium, Athens
Attendance: 15,569
Referee: Domenico Messina (Italy)

=== Group D ===
| Pos | Team | Pld | W | D | L | GF | GA | GD | Pts | Qualification | LEV | DEP | ARS | JUV |
|---|---|---|---|---|---|---|---|---|---|---|---|---|---|---|
| 1 | (Germany) Bayer Leverkusen | 6 | 3 | 1 | 2 | 11 | 11 | 0 | 10 | Advance to knockout stage | — | 3–0 | 1–1 | 3–1 |
| 2 | (Spain) Deportivo La Coruña | 6 | 3 | 1 | 2 | 7 | 6 | +1 | 10 | Advance to knockout stage | 1–3 | — | 2–0 | 2–0 |
| 3 | (England) Arsenal | 6 | 2 | 1 | 3 | 8 | 8 | 0 | 7 | | 4–1 | 0–2 | — | 3–1 |
| 4 | (Italy) Juventus | 6 | 2 | 1 | 3 | 7 | 8 | −1 | 7 | | 4–0 | 0–0 | 1–0 | — |

Source: RSSSF
21 November 2001
20:45

| Deportivo La Coruña (Spain) | 2–0 | (England) Arsenal |
|---|---|---|
| Makaay 9'; Tristán 25' | Report |

Estadio Riazor, A Coruña
Attendance: 25,864
Referee: Terje Hauge (Norway)
29 November 2001 (Note: Juventus v Bayer Leverkusen was originally scheduled for 21 November, but had to be postponed to 28 November due to heavy fog in Turin. The game was postponed for one more day because of the same visibility issues.)
15:00

| Juventus (Italy) | 4–0 | (Germany) Bayer Leverkusen |
|---|---|---|
| Trezeguet 8', 60'; Del Piero 37'; Tudor 44' | Report |

Stadio delle Alpi, Turin
Attendance: 4,926
Referee: Urs Meier (Switzerland)

4 December 2001
20:45

| Arsenal (England) | 3–1 | (Italy) Juventus |
|---|---|---|
| Ljungberg 21', 88'; Henry 28' | Report | Taylor 49' (o.g.) |

Highbury, London
Attendance: 35,421
Referee: Vítor Melo Pereira (Portugal)
4 December 2001
20:45

| Bayer Leverkusen (Germany) | 3–0 | (Spain) Deportivo La Coruña |
|---|---|---|
| Zé Roberto 64'; Neuville 67'; Ballack 79' | Report |

BayArena, Leverkusen
Attendance: 22,500
Referee: Kyros Vassaras (Greece)

19 February 2002
20:45

| Bayer Leverkusen (Germany) | 1–1 | (England) Arsenal |
|---|---|---|
| Kirsten 90' | Report | Pires 56' |

BayArena, Leverkusen
Attendance: 22,500
Referee: Alain Sars (France)
19 February 2002
20:45

| Juventus (Italy) | 0–0 | (Spain) Deportivo La Coruña |
|---|---|---|
| | Report |

Stadio delle Alpi, Turin
Attendance: 9,836
Referee: Hugh Dallas (Scotland)

27 February 2002
20:45

| Arsenal (England) | 4–1 | (Germany) Bayer Leverkusen |
|---|---|---|
| Pires 5'; Henry 7'; Vieira 48'; Bergkamp 83' | Report | Sebescen 86' |

Highbury, London
Attendance: 35,019
Referee: Alain Hamer (Luxembourg)
27 February 2002
20:45

| Deportivo La Coruña (Spain) | 2–0 | (Italy) Juventus |
|---|---|---|
| Tristán 8'; Djalminha 77' | Report |

Estadio Riazor, A Coruña
Attendance: 24,885
Referee: Anders Frisk (Sweden)

12 March 2002
20:45

| Bayer Leverkusen (Germany) | 3–1 | (Italy) Juventus |
|---|---|---|
| Butt 24' (pen.); Brdarić 71'; Babić 90+1' | Report | Tudor 61' |

BayArena, Leverkusen
Attendance: 22,500
Referee: Kim Milton Nielsen (Denmark)
12 March 2002
20:45

| Arsenal (England) | 0–2 | (Spain) Deportivo La Coruña |
|---|---|---|
| | Report | Valerón 30'; Naybet 40' |

Highbury, London
Attendance: 35,392
Referee: Urs Meier (Switzerland)

20 March 2002
20:45

| Juventus (Italy) | 1–0 | (England) Arsenal |
|---|---|---|
| Zalayeta 76' | Report |

Stadio delle Alpi, Turin
Attendance: 7,470
Referee: Karl-Erik Nilsson (Sweden)
20 March 2002
20:45

| Deportivo La Coruña (Spain) | 1–3 | (Germany) Bayer Leverkusen |
|---|---|---|
| Tristán 75' | Report | Ballack 34'; Schneider 54'; Neuville 86' |

Estadio Riazor, A Coruña
Attendance: 23,532
Referee: Valentin Ivanov (Russia)
