= 2001–02 UEFA Champions League knockout stage =

The knockout stage of the 2001–02 UEFA Champions League began on 2 April 2002 and ended on 15 May 2002 with the final at Hampden Park in Glasgow, Scotland. Teams qualified via the 2001–02 UEFA Champions League second group stage.

All times are CEST (UTC+2), as listed by UEFA.

== Qualified teams ==
The knockout staged involved the eight teams which qualified as winners and runners-up of each of the four groups in the second group stage.

Group	Winners (seeded in round of 16 draw)	Runners-up (unseeded in round of 16 draw)
A	(England) Manchester United	(Germany) Bayern Munich
B	(Spain) Barcelona	(England) Liverpool
C	(Spain) Real Madrid	(Greece) Panathinaikos
D	(Germany) Bayer Leverkusen	(Spain) Deportivo La Coruña

== Bracket ==
Quarter-finals
(Spain) Deportivo La Coruña	0	2	2
(England) Manchester United	2	3	5
(England) Liverpool	1	2	3
(Germany) Bayer Leverkusen	0	4	4
(Greece) Panathinaikos	1	1	2
(Spain) Barcelona	0	3	3
(Germany) Bayern Munich	2	0	2
(Spain) Real Madrid	1	2	3

Semi-finals
(England) Manchester United	2	1	3
(Germany) Bayer Leverkusen (a)	2	1	3
(Spain) Barcelona	0	1	1
(Spain) Real Madrid	2	1	3

Final
15 May – Glasgow
(Germany) Bayer Leverkusen	1
(Spain) Real Madrid	2

== Quarter-finals ==
=== Summary ===
The first legs were played on 2 and 3 April, and the second legs were played on 9 and 10 April 2002.

Team 1	Agg.	Team 2	1st leg	2nd leg
Panathinaikos (Greece)	2–3	(Spain) Barcelona	1–0	1–3
Bayern Munich (Germany)	2–3	(Spain) Real Madrid	2–1	0–2
Deportivo La Coruña (Spain)	2–5	(England) Manchester United	0–2	2–3
Liverpool (England)	3–4	(Germany) Bayer Leverkusen	1–0	2–4

=== Matches ===
3 April 2002
20:45

Panathinaikos (Greece)	1–0	(Spain) Barcelona
Basinas 79' (pen.)	Report

Leoforos Alexandras Stadium, Athens
Attendance: 15,465
Referee: Terje Hauge (Norway)
9 April 2002
20:45

Barcelona (Spain)	3–1	(Greece) Panathinaikos
Luis Enrique 23', 49'; Saviola 61'	Report	Konstantinou 8'

Camp Nou, Barcelona
Attendance: 92,377
Referee: Urs Meier (Switzerland)

Barcelona won 3–2 on aggregate.

2 April 2002
20:45

Bayern Munich (Germany)	2–1	(Spain) Real Madrid
Effenberg 82'; Pizarro 88'	Report	Geremi 11'

Olympiastadion, Munich
Attendance: 60,000
Referee: Hugh Dallas (Scotland)
10 April 2002
20:45

Real Madrid (Spain)	2–0	(Germany) Bayern Munich
Helguera 69'; Guti 85'	Report

Santiago Bernabéu, Madrid
Attendance: 75,300
Referee: Stefano Braschi (Italy)

Real Madrid won 3–2 on aggregate.

2 April 2002
20:45

Deportivo La Coruña (Spain)	0–2	(England) Manchester United
	Report	Beckham 15'; Van Nistelrooy 41'

Estadio Riazor, A Coruña
Attendance: 32,351
Referee: Kyros Vassaras (Greece)
10 April 2002
19:45

Manchester United (England)	3–2	(Spain) Deportivo La Coruña
Solskjær 23', 56'; Giggs 69'	Report	Blanc 45' (o.g.); Djalminha 90+1'

Old Trafford, Manchester
Attendance: 65,875
Referee: Markus Merk (Germany)

Manchester United won 5–2 on aggregate.

3 April 2002
19:45

Liverpool (England)	1–0	(Germany) Bayer Leverkusen
Hyypiä 44'	Report

Anfield, Liverpool
Attendance: 42,254
Referee: Anders Frisk (Sweden)
9 April 2002
20:45

Bayer Leverkusen (Germany)	4–2	(England) Liverpool
Ballack 16', 64'; Berbatov 68'; Lúcio 84'	Report	Xavier 42'; Litmanen 79'

BayArena, Leverkusen
Attendance: 22,855
Referee: Vítor Melo Pereira (Portugal)

Bayer Leverkusen won 4–3 on aggregate.

== Semi-finals ==
=== Summary ===
The first legs were played on 23 and 24 April, and the second legs were played on 30 April and 1 May 2002.

Team 1	Agg.	Team 2	1st leg	2nd leg
Barcelona (Spain)	1–3	(Spain) Real Madrid	0–2	1–1
Manchester United (England)	3–3 (a)	(Germany) Bayer Leverkusen	2–2	1–1

=== Matches ===
23 April 2002
20:45

Barcelona (Spain)	0–2	(Spain) Real Madrid
	Report	Zidane 55'; McManaman 90+2'

Camp Nou, Barcelona
Attendance: 98,112
Referee: Anders Frisk (Sweden)
1 May 2002
20:45

Real Madrid (Spain)	1–1	(Spain) Barcelona
Raúl 43'	Report	Helguera 49' (o.g.)

Santiago Bernabéu, Madrid
Attendance: 74,200
Referee: Pierluigi Collina (Italy)

Real Madrid won 3–1 on aggregate.

24 April 2002
19:45

Manchester United (England)	2–2	(Germany) Bayer Leverkusen
Živković 29' (o.g.); Van Nistelrooy 67' (pen.)	Report	Ballack 62'; Neuville 75'

Old Trafford, Manchester
Attendance: 66,534
Referee: Ľuboš Micheľ (Slovakia)
30 April 2002
20:45

Bayer Leverkusen (Germany)	1–1	(England) Manchester United
Neuville 45+2'	Report	Keane 28'

BayArena, Leverkusen
Attendance: 20,605
Referee: Kim Milton Nielsen (Denmark)

3–3 on aggregate; Bayer Leverkusen won on away goals.

== Final ==
The final was played on 15 May 2002 at Hampden Park in Glasgow, Scotland.

15 May 2002
20:45 (19:45 UTC+1)

Bayer Leverkusen (Germany)	1–2	(Spain) Real Madrid
Lúcio 14'	Report	Raúl 8'; Zidane 45'

Hampden Park, Glasgow
Attendance: 50,499
Referee: Urs Meier (Switzerland)
