= Urs Meier =

Swiss football referee

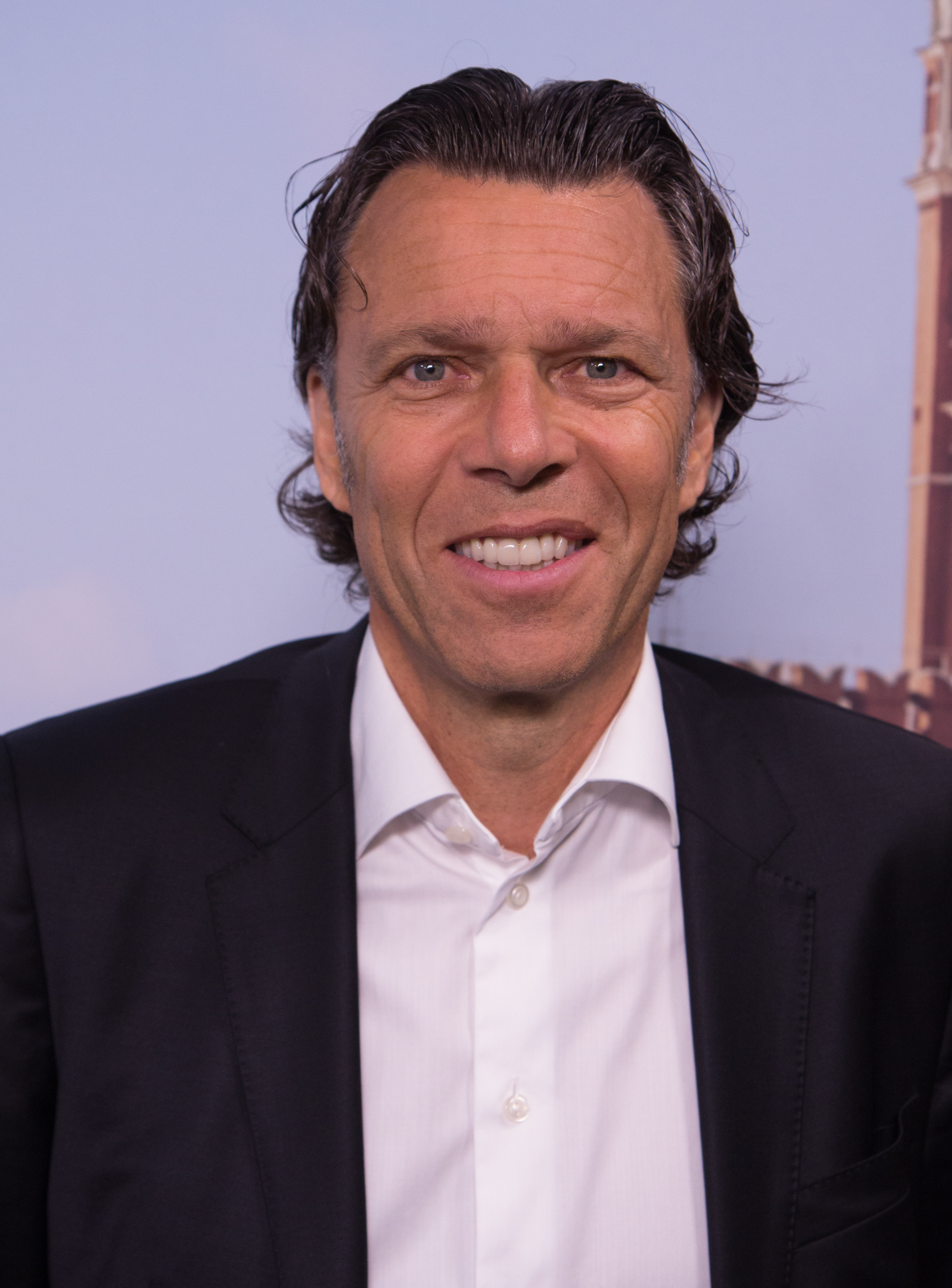
- Born: 22 January 1959 (age 67); Zürich, Switzerland

Domestic
Years	League	Role
1989–2004	Swiss Nationalliga A	Referee

International
Years	League	Role
1994–2004	FIFA-listed	Referee

Urs Meier (born 22 January 1959) is a retired Swiss football referee. He officiated at the 1998 and 2002 World Cups, taking charge of the semi-final between South Korea and Germany in 2002. He also refereed the 2002 UEFA Champions League Final that year. He appeared at Euro 2000 and Euro 2004, refereeing the quarter-final between England and Portugal in 2004. He retired 6 months later.

Meier received FIFA appointments and refereed in the Swiss top division until he reached the mandatory retirement age for each. He now appears as a pundit on the German television channel ZDF during World Cups and European Championships. He also owns a brand of household appliances in Würenlos, Switzerland.

== Life ==
Meier was born on 22 January 1959 in Zürich.

== Career ==
At the 1998 World Cup, Meier refereed the famous USA-Iran match. Later in an interview, he claimed that he had predicted himself as the referee of that match due to Switzerland's role as protecting power of United States in Iran.

He refereed a qualification match for Euro 2004 between Romania and Denmark. Denmark equalised in extra time to eliminate Romania. Romanian side argued he should have ended the game more than a minute before. Also, the penalty allowing Denmark to score the first goal was highly disputed, even the Danish TV commentator saying "only certain host teams are awarded such penalties". After several Romanian newspapers published his email address after the game, Meier received 14,000 e-mails, including death threats.

He refereed the Euro 2004 quarter-final between England and Portugal at Lisbon, which ended in a 2–2 draw with Portugal proceeding to win on a penalty shootout. In the 90th minute, Sol Campbell found the net, but Meier disallowed the goal citing a push on the Portuguese keeper. After the match Meier's personal details were published by British tabloid newspapers and Meier received more than 16,000 abusive e-mails, including death threats. Reporters from The Sun travelled to Switzerland and placed a giant English flag on a field near his home. As a result, he was placed under police protection.
