= 2002–03 Bayer 04 Leverkusen season =

Bayer Leverkusen
2002–03 season
- Manager: Klaus Toppmöller; Thomas Hörster; Klaus Augenthaler
- Bundesliga: 15th
- Champions League: Second group stage
- DFB-Pokal: Semi-final
- Top goalscorer: Daniel Bierofka (7)
Home colours	Away colours	Third colours

Bayer 04 Leverkusen had a shocking season, in which it went from being in the final of the UEFA Champions League the previous season, to finish 15th in Bundesliga, only just escaping relegation to the second tier. It also went out of the Champions League in the second group stage, not even clinching a single point.

== Players ==
=== First-team squad ===
Squad at end of season

Note: Flags indicate national team as defined under FIFA eligibility rules; some limited exceptions apply. Players may hold more than one non-FIFA nationality.

No.	Pos.	Nation	Player
1	GK	GER	Hans-Jörg Butt
2	DF	GER	Christoph Preuß (on loan from Eintracht Frankfurt)
3	DF	BRA	Lúcio
4	DF	BRA	Juan
5	DF	GER	Jens Nowotny
6	DF	CRO	Boris Živković (Note: Živković was born in Živinice, SFR Yugoslavia (now Bosnia and Herzegovina), but also qualified to represent Croatia internationally and made his international debut for Croatia in 1999.)
8	MF	CZE	Jan Šimák
9	FW	GER	Ulf Kirsten
10	MF	TUR	Yıldıray Baştürk (Note: Baştürk was born in Herne, West Germany, but also qualified to represent Turkey internationally and made his international debut for Turkey in 1998.)
11	FW	BRA	França
12	FW	BUL	Dimitar Berbatov
13	MF	GER	Daniel Bierofka
14	MF	GER	Hanno Balitsch
15	MF	CRO	Jurica Vranješ
16	MF	GER	Ioannis Masmanidis
17	MF	NGR	Pascal Ojigwe
19	MF	CRO	Marko Babić

No.	Pos.	Nation	Player
20	GK	AUS	Frank Jurić
21	MF	POL	Radosław Kałużny
22	DF	BRA	Cris (on loan from Cruzeiro)
23	FW	GER	Thomas Brdarić
25	MF	GER	Bernd Schneider
26	MF	GER	Zoltán Sebescen
27	FW	GER	Oliver Neuville (Note: Neuville was born in Locarno, Switzerland, but also qualified to represent Italy and Germany internationally through his mother and father respectively and made his international debut for Germany in September 1998.)
28	MF	GER	Carsten Ramelow
31	GK	GER	Tom Starke
33	MF	GER	Anel Džaka (Note: Džaka was born in Sarajevo, SFR Yugoslavia (now Bosnia and Herzegovina), but also qualified to represent Germany internationally and represented Germany at U-21 level.)
34	MF	GER	Hüzeyfe Doğan (Note: Doğan was born in Karakoçan, Turkey, and represented Turkey at U-19 level, but was raised in Germany and also represented Germany at U-20 level.)
35	DF	ARG	Diego Placente
46	DF	CRO	Mile Božić (Note: Božić was born in Leverkusen, West Germany, but also qualified to represent Croatia internationally and represented Croatia at U-21 level.)
47	DF	GER	Thomas Kleine
51	MF	MAR	Nasir El Kasmi (Note: El Kasmi was born in Wuppertal, West Germany, but also qualified to represent Morocco internationally.)
57	FW	GER	Sebastian Schoof

=== Out on loan ===
Note: Flags indicate national team as defined under FIFA eligibility rules; some limited exceptions apply. Players may hold more than one non-FIFA nationality.

No.	Pos.	Nation	Player
18	DF	USA	Frankie Hejduk (at St Gallen)
24	DF	AUT	Emanuel Pogatetz (at FC Aarau)
—	DF	GER	Michael Zepek (at LR Ahlen)
—	MF	BRA	Robson Ponte (at Wolfsburg)

No.	Pos.	Nation	Player
—	FW	USA	Landon Donovan (at San Jose Earthquakes)
—	FW	KOR	Cha Du-ri (Note: Cha was born in Frankfurt, West Germany, but also qualified to represent South Korea internationally through his father and made his debut for South Korea in 2001.) (at Arminia Bielefeld)
—	FW	GER	Clemens Fritz (at Karlsruhe)

=== Reserve team ===
Note: Flags indicate national team as defined under FIFA eligibility rules; some limited exceptions apply. Players may hold more than one non-FIFA nationality.

No.	Pos.	Nation	Player
29	DF	GER	Jan-Ingwer Callsen-Bracker
—	GK	GER	René Adler
—	GK	GER	Maurice Gillen
—	DF	CZE	Petr Čoupek
—	DF	GER	Fabian Käfer-Ewertz
—	DF	GER	Alexander Meyer
—	DF	GER	Sven Schaffrath
—	MF	GER	Domenico Cozza
—	MF	GER	Gall Dhompirom

No.	Pos.	Nation	Player
—	MF	GER	Oliver Dittrich
—	MF	CRO	Michael Habljak
—	MF	GER	Tim Jerat
—	MF	GER	Tim Kruse
—	MF	GER	Erkan Öztürk
—	FW	BRA	Henrique Luizão
—	FW	GER	Pascal Olivier
—	FW	GER	Kenan Şahin (Note: Şahin was born in Cologne, West Germany, but also qualified to represent Turkey internationally and represented them at U-21 level.)
—	FW	GER	Danny Thönes

== Bundesliga ==
=== Matches ===
- Energie Cottbus-Bayer Leverkusen 1–1
- 0–1 Jan Šimák (63)
- 1–1 Vilmos Sebők (80)
- Bayer Leverkusen-Borussia Dortmund 1–1
- 1–0 Diego Placente (23)
- 1–1 Jan Koller (61)
- Bayer Leverkusen-Bochum 2–4
- 1–0 Jan Šimák (8)
- 1–1 Thordur Gudjonsson (13)
- 1–2 Dariusz Wosz (33)
- 1–3 Frank Fahrenhorst (44)
- 1–4 Thomas Christiansen (60)
- 2–4 França (76)
- Hansa Rostock-Bayer Leverkusen 1–3
- 0–1 Oliver Neuville (5)
- 0–2 Thomas Brdarić (22)
- 1–2 Jochen Kientz (75)
- 1–3 Bernd Schneider (88)
- Bayer Leverkusen-Hannover 1–3
- 1–0 Yıldıray Baştürk (11)
- 1–1 Fredi Bobić (41)
- 1–2 Fredi Bobić (80)
- 1–3 Mohamadou Idrissou (83)
- Werder Bremen-Bayer Leverkusen 3–2
- 0–1 Thomas Brdarić (11)
- 1–1 Ailton (25 pen)
- 2–1 Angelos Charisteas (27)
- 3–1 Angelos Charisteas (32)
- 3–2 Paul Stalteri (42 og)
- Bayer Leverkusen-Bayern Munich 2–1
- 1–0 Lúcio (9)
- 2–0 Daniel Bierofka (63)
- 2–1 Hasan Salihamidžić (89)
- Wolfsburg-Bayer Leverkusen 2–0
- 1–0 Tomislav Marić (6)
- 2–0 Stefan Effenberg (64)
- Bayer Leverkusen-Kaiserslautern 1–0
- 1–0 Thomas Brdarić (19)
- Hertha Berlin-Bayer Leverkusen 1–1
- 1–0 Arne Friedrich (20)
- 1–1 Juan (54)
- Bayer Leverkusen-Stuttgart 0–1
- 0–1 Silvio Meißner (19)
- Schalke 04-Bayer Leverkusen 0–1
- 0–1 Bernd Schneider (90 pen)
- Bayer Leverkusen-Mönchengladbach 2–2
- 0–1 Igor Demo (25)
- 1–1 Daniel Bierofka (29)
- 1–2 Bernd Korzynietz (70)
- 2–2 Daniel Bierofka (87)
- Arminia Bielefeld-Bayer Leverkusen 2–2
- 0–1 Thomas Brdarić (17)
- 1–1 Artur Wichniarek (26)
- 1–2 Boris Živković (69)
- 2–2 Artur Wichniarek (83)
- Bayer Leverkusen-Hamburg 2–3
- 0–1 Bernardo Romeo (3)
- 1–1 Hanno Balitsch (11)
- 2–1 Yıldıray Baştürk (21)
- 2–2 Bernardo Romeo (52)
- 2–3 Sergej Barbarez (76)
- 1860 Munich-Bayer Leverkusen 0–3
- 0–1 Daniel Bierofka (10)
- 0–2 Dimitar Berbatov (51)
- 0–3 Oliver Neuville (89)
- Bayer Leverkusen-Nürnberg 0–2
- 0–1 Saša Ćirić (59)
- 0–2 Júnior (88)
- Bayer Leverkusen-Energie Cottbus 0–3
- 0–1 Marcel Gebhardt (15)
- 0–2 Marko Topić (32)
- 0–3 Andrzej Juskowiak (85)
- Borussia Dortmund-Bayer Leverkusen 2–0
- 1–0 Ewerthon (3)
- 2–0 Jan Koller (29)
- Bochum-Bayer Leverkusen 2–1
- 1–0 Vahid Hashemian (69)
- 1–1 Marko Babić (78)
- 2–1 Vahid Hashemian (84)
- Bayer Leverkusen-Hansa Rostock 1–2
- 0–1 Bachirou Salou (35)
- 1–1 Marko Babić (38)
- 1–2 Bachirou Salou (41)
- Hannover-Bayer Leverkusen 1–2
- 1–0 Gheorghe Popescu (14)
- 1–1 Sebastian Schoof (80)
- 1–2 Jan Šimák (90)
- Bayer Leverkusen-Werder Bremen 3–0
- 1–0 Daniel Bierofka (11)
- 2–0 Sebastian Schoof (50)
- 3–0 Juan (61)
- Bayern Munich-Bayer Leverkusen 3–0
- 1–0 Claudio Pizarro (2)
- 2–0 Giovane Élber (22)
- 3–0 Giovane Élber (75)
- Bayer Leverkusen-Wolfsburg 1–1
- 1–0 Carsten Ramelow (68)
- 1–1 Tomislav Marić (81)
- Kaiserslautern-Bayer Leverkusen 1–0
- 1–0 Miroslav Klose (40)
- Bayer Leverkusen-Hertha Berlin 4–1
- 1–0 Hans-Jörg Butt (14)
- 2–0 Bernd Schneider (32)
- 3–0 Oliver Neuville (41)
- 4–0 Oliver Neuville (70)
- 4–1 Michael Preetz (76)
- Stuttgart-Bayer Leverkusen 3–0
- 1–0 Ioannis Amanatidis (9)
- 2–0 Alexander Hleb (17)
- 3–0 Ioan Ganea (50)
- Bayer Leverkusen-Schalke 04 1–3
- 1–0 Dimitar Berbatov (9)
- 1–1 Jörg Böhme (12)
- 1–2 Ebbe Sand (61)
- 1–3 Gerald Asamoah (90)
- Mönchengladbach-Bayer Leverkusen 2–2
- 1–0 Igor Demo (6)
- 1–1 Daniel Bierofka (17)
- 1–2 Dimitar Berbatov (47)
- 2–2 Morten Skoubo (89)
- Bayer Leverkusen-Arminia Bielefeld 3–1
- 0–1 Ansgar Brinkmann (34 pen)
- 1–1 Lúcio (38)
- 2–1 Lúcio (69)
- 3–1 Hanno Balitsch (71)
- Hamburg-Bayer Leverkusen 4–1
- 1–0 Sergej Barbarez (18)
- 2–0 Bernardo Romeo (55)
- 2–1 Hanno Balitsch (88)
- 3–1 Lars Jacobsen (90)
- 4–1 Erik Meijer (90)
- Bayer Leverkusen-1860 Munich 3–0
- 1–0 Daniel Bierofka (8)
- 2–0 Dimitar Berbatov (44)
- 3–0 Marko Babić (48)
- Nürnberg-Bayer Leverkusen 0–1
- 0–1 Yıldıray Baştürk (35)

=== Topscorers ===
- (Germany) Daniel Bierofka 7
- (Bulgaria) Dimitar Berbatov 4
- (Germany) Oliver Neuville 4

== Champions League ==
=== 1st Group Stage ===
- Olympiacos-Bayer Leverkusen 6–2
- 0–1 Bernd Schneider (22)
- 1–1 Giovanni (27)
- 2–1 Stelios Giannakopoulos (38)
- 3–1 Predrag Đorđević (44)
- 4–1 Predrag Đorđević (64 pen)
- 5–1 Predrag Đorđević (73)
- 5–2 Bernd Schneider (78 pen)
- 6–2 Pär Zetterberg (87)
- Bayer Leverkusen-Manchester United 1–2
- 0–1 Ruud van Nistelrooy (31)
- 0–2 Ruud van Nistelrooy (44)
- 1–2 Dimitar Berbatov (52)
- Maccabi Haifa-Bayer Leverkusen 0–2
- 0–1 Marko Babić (31)
- 0–2 Marko Babić (62)
- Bayer Leverkusen-Maccabi Haifa 2–1
- 1–0 Marko Babić (45)
- 1–1 Nenad Pralija (53)
- 2–1 Juan (67)
- Bayer Leverkusen-Olympiacos 2–0
- 1–0 Juan (15)
- 2–0 Bernd Schneider (89 pen)
- Manchester United-Bayer Leverkusen 2–0
- 1–0 Juan Sebastián Verón (42)
- 2–0 Ruud van Nistelrooy (69)

=== 2nd Group Stage ===
- Bayer Leverkusen-Barcelona 1–2
- 1–0 Dimitar Berbatov (39)
- 1–1 Javier Saviola (48)
- 1–2 Marc Overmars (88)
- Inter-Bayer Leverkusen 3–2
- 1–0 Luigi Di Biagio (14)
- 2–0 Luigi Di Biagio (27)
- 2–1 Boris Živković (62)
- 3–1 Hans-Jörg Butt (80 og)
- 3–2 França (90)
- Bayer Leverkusen-Newcastle 1–3
- 0–1 Shola Ameobi (5)
- 0–2 Shola Ameobi (15)
- 1–2 França (25)
- 1–3 Lomana Lua Lua (32)
- Newcastle-Bayer Leverkusen 3–1
- 1–0 Alan Shearer (5)
- 2–0 Alan Shearer (11)
- 3–0 Alan Shearer (36 pen)
- 3–1 Marko Babić (73)
- Barcelona-Bayer Leverkusen 2–0
- 1–0 Javier Saviola (16)
- 2–0 Thomas Kleine (49 og)
- Bayer Leverkusen-Inter 0–2
- 0–1 Obafemi Martins (36)
- 0–2 Emre Belözoğlu (90)

== Kits ==
Home	Home Alternate	Away	Third
