= 2001–02 Bayer 04 Leverkusen season =

Bayer Leverkusen
2001–02 season
- Manager: Klaus Toppmöller
- Bundesliga: 2nd
- DFB-Pokal: Runners-up
- DFL-Ligapokal: Preliminary round
- Champions League: Runners-up
- Top goalscorer: League: Michael Ballack (17); All: Michael Ballack (23)
Home colours	Away colours	Third colours

The 2001–02 season saw Bayer Leverkusen become the second club to finish runners-up in the domestic league, domestic cup and Champions League in the same season after Barcelona in 1986, with a potential treble unravelling in the final couple of weeks of the season, resulting in no trophies won at all, plus the defections of stars Michael Ballack and Zé Roberto to Bayern Munich. Leverkusen dominated the second half of the Champions League final against Real Madrid, but lost 2–1 due to a volley from Zinedine Zidane in the latter stages of the first interval.

== Overview ==
Competition	Record								Result	Top Scorer
Competition	G	W	D	L	GF	GA	GD	Win %	Result	Top Scorer
Bundesliga	34	21	6	7	77	38	+39	61.76	runners-up	(Germany) Michael Ballack, 17
DFB-Pokal	6	5	0	1	16	8	+8	83.33	runners-up	(Bulgaria) Dimitar Berbatov, 6
Premiere Ligapokal	1	0	0	1	1	2	−1	0.00	Preliminary Round	(Germany) Oliver Neuville, 1
UEFA Champions League	19	9	4	6	32	28	+4	47.37	runners-up	(Germany) Oliver Neuville, 7
Total	60	35	10	15	126	74	+52	58.33		(Germany) Michael Ballack, 23

== Players ==
=== First-team squad ===
Squad at end of season

Note: Flags indicate national team as defined under FIFA eligibility rules; some limited exceptions apply. Players may hold more than one non-FIFA nationality.

No.	Pos.	Nation	Player
1	GK	GER	Hans-Jörg Butt
3	MF	CRO	Marko Babić
4	DF	GER	Michael Zepek
5	DF	GER	Jens Nowotny
6	DF	CRO	Boris Živković (Note: Živković was born in Živinice, SFR Yugoslavia (now Bosnia and Herzegovina), but also qualified to represent Croatia internationally and made his debut for Croatia in 1999.)
8	MF	BRA	Zé Roberto
9	FW	GER	Ulf Kirsten
10	MF	TUR	Yıldıray Baştürk (Note: Baştürk was born in Herne, West Germany (now Germany), but also qualified to represent Turkey internationally and made his debut for Turkey in 1998.)
12	FW	BUL	Dimitar Berbatov
13	MF	GER	Michael Ballack
15	MF	CRO	Jurica Vranješ
17	MF	NGR	Pascal Ojigwe
18	DF	USA	Frankie Hejduk
19	DF	BRA	Lúcio
20	GK	AUS	Frank Jurić

No.	Pos.	Nation	Player
23	FW	GER	Thomas Brdarić
24	DF	AUT	Emanuel Pogatetz
25	MF	GER	Bernd Schneider
26	MF	GER	Zoltán Sebescen
27	FW	GER	Oliver Neuville (Note: Neuville was born in Locarno, Switzerland, but also qualified to represent Italy and Germany internationally through his mother and father respectively and made his debut for Germany in September 1998.)
28	MF	GER	Carsten Ramelow
29	MF	GER	Thorsten Wittek
31	GK	GER	Tom Starke
33	FW	GER	Anel Džaka (Note: Džaka was born in Sarajevo, SFR Yugoslavia (now Bosnia and Herzegovina), but also qualified to represent Germany internationally and represented Germany at U-21 level.)
34	MF	GER	Hüzeyfe Doğan (Note: Doğan was born in Karakoçan, Turkey, and represented Turkey at U-19 level, but was raised in Germany and represented Germany at U-20 level.)
35	DF	ARG	Diego Placente
40	FW	GER	Thorsten Burkhardt
46	DF	GER	Mile Božić (Note: Božić was born in Leverkusen, West Germany (now Germany), but also qualified to represent Croatia internationally and represented Croatia at U-21 level.)
47	DF	GER	Thomas Kleine

=== Left club during season ===
Note: Flags indicate national team as defined under FIFA eligibility rules; some limited exceptions apply. Players may hold more than one non-FIFA nationality.

No.	Pos.	Nation	Player
11	FW	GER	Paulo Rink (Note: Rink was born in Curitiba, Brazil, but obtained German citizenship and made his debut for Germany in September 1998.) (to 1. FC Nürnberg)
21	MF	BRA	Marquinhos (to Flamengo)

No.	Pos.	Nation	Player
30	FW	GER	Markus Daun (to Alemannia Aachen)

== Transfers ==
=== In ===
- (Germany) Hans-Jörg Butt - unattached (last at (Germany) Hamburg)
- (Austria) Emanuel Pogatetz - (Austria) FC Kärnten
- (Germany) Zoltán Sebescen - (Germany) Wolfsburg
- (Germany) Michael Zepek - (Germany) Karlsruher SC
- (Turkey) Yıldıray Baştürk - (Germany) VfL Bochum

=== Out ===
- (Poland) Adam Matysek - (Poland) Zagłębie Lubin
- (Germany) Jörg Reeb - (Germany) Köln
- (Croatia) Robert Kovač - (Germany) Bayern Munich
- (Germany) Andreas Neuendorf - (Germany) Hertha BSC
- (Germany) Paulo Rink - (Germany) 1. FC Nürnberg
- (Brazil) Marquinhos - (Brazil) Flamengo
- (Germany) Markus Daun - (Germany) Alemannia Aachen

=== Loan out ===
- (Brazil) Robson Ponte - (Germany) Wolfsburg

== Match results ==
=== Bundesliga ===
Pos	Team	Pld	W	D	L	GF	GA	GD	Pts	Qualification or relegation
1	Borussia Dortmund (C)	34	21	7	6	62	33	+29	70	Qualification to Champions League group stage
2	Bayer Leverkusen	34	21	6	7	77	38	+39	69	Qualification to Champions League group stage
3	Bayern Munich	34	20	8	6	65	25	+40	68	Qualification to Champions League third qualifying round
4	Hertha BSC	34	18	7	9	61	38	+23	61	Qualification to UEFA Cup first round
5	Schalke 04	34	18	7	9	52	36	+16	61	Qualification to UEFA Cup first round

Source: bundesliga.de
Rules for classification: 1) points; 2) goal difference; 3) number of goals scored.
(C) Champions

28 July 2001 1	Bayer Leverkusen	2–1	Wolfsburg	Leverkusen
15:30	Lúcio 40', 47'		Feldhoff 86'	Stadium: BayArena; Attendance: 22,000

4 August 2001 2	Hansa Rostock	0–3	Bayer Leverkusen	Rostock
15:30			Baştürk 12'; Kirsten 66'; Sebescen 76'	Stadium: Ostseestadion; Attendance: 25,100; Referee: Florian Meyer

11 August 2001 3	Bayer Leverkusen	1–1	Bayern Munich	Leverkusen
15:30	Kirsten 69'		Élber 79'	Stadium: BayArena; Attendance: 22,500

18 August 2001 4	Schalke 04	3–3	Bayer Leverkusen	Gelsenkirchen
15:30	Hajto 10'; Böhme 40' (pen.); Mpenza 80'		Ballack 58'; Kirsten 73'; Schneider 90'	Stadium: Arena AufSchalke; Attendance: 60,204; Referee: Alfons Berg

8 September 2001 5	Borussia Mönchengladbach	0–1	Bayer Leverkusen	Mönchengladbach
15:30			Butt 3' (pen.)	Stadium: Bökelbergstadion; Attendance: 30,184; Referee: Hartmut Strampe

15 September 2001 6	Bayer Leverkusen	3–1	St. Pauli	Leverkusen
15:30	Ballack 44'; Kirsten 60'; Schneider 80'		Rath 79'	Stadium: BayArena; Attendance: 21,000

22 September 2001 7	Borussia Dortmund	1–1	Bayer Leverkusen	Dortmund
15:30	Amoroso 7'		Berbatov 79'	Stadium: Westfalenstadion; Attendance: 64,500; Referee: Jürgen Jansen

30 September 2001 8	Bayer Leverkusen	4–1	Freiburg	Leverkusen
17:00	Baştürk 10'; Ballack 23', 42'; Neuville 60'		Sellimi 25'	Stadium: BayArena; Attendance: 22,500

13 October 2001 9	Energie Cottbus	2–3	Bayer Leverkusen	Cottbus
15:30	Helbig 12'; Sebok 52'		Kirsten 4', 57' (pen.); Ballack 43'	Stadium: Stadion der Freundschaft; Attendance: 16,460; Referee: Herbert Fandel

20 October 2001 10	Bayer Leverkusen	4–1	Stuttgart	Leverkusen
15:30	Zé Roberto 24'; Živković 59'; Lúcio 63'; Berbatov 85'		Ganea 9'	Stadium: BayArena; Attendance: 22,500

27 October 2001 11	1860 Munich	1–4	Bayer Leverkusen	Munich
15:30	Häßler 31'		Hoffmann 33' (o.g.); Placente 78'; Schneider 84'; Neuville 90' (pen.)	Stadium: Olympiastadion; Attendance: 25,000; Referee: Hartmut Strampe

3 November 2001 12	Bayer Leverkusen	2–1	Kaiserslautern	Leverkusen
15:30	Ballack 34', 50' (pen.)		Strasser 18'	Stadium: BayArena; Attendance: 22,500

17 November 2001 13	Köln	1–2	Bayer Leverkusen	Cologne
15:30	Kurth 57'		Kirsten 63'; Neuville 72'	Stadium: RheinEnergieStadion; Attendance: 41,000; Referee: Uwe Kemmling

24 November 2001 14	Bayer Leverkusen	4–1	Hamburg	Leverkusen
15:30	Ballack 14'; Neuville 27', 58', 63'		Albertz 7'	Stadium: BayArena; Attendance: 22,500

1 December 2001 15	Werder Bremen	2–1	Bayer Leverkusen	Bremen
15:30	Bode 39'; Verlaat 58'		Schneider 38'	Stadium: Weserstadion; Attendance: 32,100; Referee: Jörg Kessler

8 December 2001 16	Bayer Leverkusen	4–2	Nürnberg	Leverkusen
15:30	Zé Roberto 27'; Sebescen 62'; Ballack 63'; Neuville 85'		Cacau 26', 58'	Stadium: BayArena; Attendance: 22,500

15 December 2001 17	Hertha BSC	2–1	Bayer Leverkusen	Berlin
15:30	Neuendorf 19'; Dárdai 62'		Neuville 37'	Stadium: Olympiastadion; Attendance: 34,635; Referee: Franz-Xaver Wack

19 December 2001 18	Wolfsburg	3–1	Bayer Leverkusen	Wolfsburg
20:00	Ponte 40'; Marić 56', 77'		Neuville 87'	Stadium: VfL-Stadion am Elsterweg; Attendance: 12,116; Referee: Hellmut Krug

26 January 2002 19	Bayer Leverkusen	2–0	Hansa Rostock	Leverkusen
15:30	Živković 76'; Ballack 80'			Stadium: BayArena; Attendance: 22,500

3 February 2002 20	Bayern Munich	2–0	Bayer Leverkusen	Munich
17:30	Élber 67'; Effenberg 71'			Stadium: Olympiastadion; Attendance: 43,000; Referee: Herbert Fandel

6 February 2002 21	Bayer Leverkusen	0–1	Schalke 04	Leverkusen
20:00			Böhme 52'	Stadium: BayArena; Attendance: 22,500

9 February 2002 22	Bayer Leverkusen	5–0	Borussia Mönchengladbach	Leverkusen
15:30	Ballack 9'; Neuville 17'; Schneider 31'; Ramelow 84'; Berbatov 87'			Stadium: BayArena; Attendance: 22,500

16 February 2002 23	St. Pauli	2–2	Bayer Leverkusen	Hamburg
15:30	Rath 27'; Meggle 90' (pen.)		Kirsten 6'; Ballack 70'	Stadium: Millerntor-Stadion; Attendance: 19,881; Referee: Jürgen Jansen

24 February 2002 24	Bayer Leverkusen	4–0	Borussia Dortmund	Leverkusen
17:30	Ballack 32'; Ramelow 50'; Neuville 64'; Berbatov 74'			Stadium: BayArena; Attendance: 22,500

2 March 2002 25	Freiburg	2–2	Bayer Leverkusen	Freiburg im Breisgau
15:30	Sellimi 41'; But 53'		Ballack 64'; Berbatov 76'	Stadium: Schwarzwald-Stadion; Attendance: 24,000; Referee: Edgar Steinborn

9 March 2002 26	Bayer Leverkusen	2–0	Energie Cottbus	Leverkusen
15:30	Zé Roberto 12'; Berbatov 90'			Stadium: BayArena; Attendance: 22,500; Referee: Hellmut Krug

16 March 2002 27	Stuttgart	0–2	Bayer Leverkusen	Stuttgart
15:30			Brdarić 41'; Berbatov 45'	Stadium: Gottlieb-Daimler-Stadion; Attendance: 25,000; Referee: Hermann Albrecht

23 March 2002 28	Bayer Leverkusen	4–0	1860 Munich	Leverkusen
15:30	Sebescen 45'; Kirsten 49', 81'; Baştürk 61'			Stadium: BayArena; Attendance: 22,500; Referee: Uwe Kemmling

30 March 2002 29	Kaiserslautern	2–4	Bayer Leverkusen	Kaiserslautern
15:30	Ramzy 45'; Lokvenc 55'		Kirsten 1'; Neuville 16'; Ballack 77' (pen.); Berbatov 86'	Stadium: Fritz-Walter-Stadion; Attendance: 39,578; Referee: Hellmut Krug

6 April 2002 30	Bayer Leverkusen	2–0	Köln	Leverkusen
15:30	Butt 13' (pen.); Lúcio 25'			Stadium: BayArena; Attendance: 22,500; Referee: Herbert Fandel

13 April 2002 31	Hamburg	1–1	Bayer Leverkusen	Hamburg
15:30	Barbarez 5'		Neuville 13'	Stadium: AOL Arena; Attendance: 54,503; Referee: Hartmut Strampe

20 April 2002 32	Bayer Leverkusen	1–2	Werder Bremen	Leverkusen
15:30	Zé Roberto 31'		Lisztes 5'; Ailton 61'	Stadium: BayArena; Attendance: 22,500; Referee: Alfons Berg

27 April 2002 33	Nürnberg	1–0	Bayer Leverkusen	Nuremberg
15:30	Nikl 23'			Stadium: Max-Morlock-Stadion; Attendance: 44,416; Referee: Markus Merk

4 May 2002 34	Bayer Leverkusen	2–1	Hertha BSC	Leverkusen
15:30	Ballack 10', 51'		Beinlich 83'	Stadium: BayArena; Attendance: 22,500; Referee: Herbert Fandel

=== DFB-Pokal ===
26 August 2001 First round	Jahn Regensburg	0–3	Bayer Leverkusen	Regensburg
15:30		Report	Kirsten 13'; Lúcio 54'; Schneider 61'	Stadium: Jahnstadion; Attendance: 10,500; Referee: Jörg Keßler

11 December 2001 Second round	VfL Bochum	2–3	Bayer Leverkusen	Bochum
19:00	Freier 28'; Colding 75'	Report	Berbatov 27', 77', 90'	Stadium: Ruhrstadion; Attendance: 11,882; Referee: Wolfgang Stark

22 January 2002 Round of 16	Hannover 96	1–2	Bayer Leverkusen	Hanover
19:00	Keita 47'	Report	Neuville 20'; Kirsten 47'	Stadium: Niedersachsenstadion; Attendance: 46,143; Referee: Lutz Michael Fröhlich

30 January 2002 Quarter-Final	Bayer Leverkusen	3–0	1860 München	Leverkusen
	Berbatov 66', 73'; Brdarić 80'	Report (in German)		Stadium: BayArena; Attendance: 17,000; Referee: Edgar Steinborn

5 March 2002 Semi-Final	Bayer Leverkusen	3–1 (a.e.t.)	1. FC Köln	Leverkusen
	Zellweger 59' (o.g.); Živković 100'; Schneider 114'		Song 90'	Stadium: BayArena; Attendance: 22,500; Referee: Markus Merk

11 May 2002 Final	Schalke 04	4–2	Bayer Leverkusen	Berlin
19:45	Böhme 45'; Agali 68'; Möller 71'; Sand 85'	Report	Berbatov 27'; Kirsten 89'	Stadium: Olympic Stadium; Attendance: 70,000; Referee: Franz-Xaver Wack

=== Premiere Ligapokal ===
12 July 2001 1st Round	Bayer Leverkusen	1–2	Hertha BSC	Dessau
20:30	Neuville 73'	Report	49' Marcelinho; 63' Deisler	Stadium: Paul Greifzu Stadium; Attendance: 14,400; Referee: Michael Weiner

=== Champions League ===
==== Third qualifying round ====
8 August 2001 1st Leg	Red Star Belgrade	0–0	Bayer Leverkusen	Belgrade, Serbia and Montenegro
20:30		Report		Stadium: Red Star Stadium; Attendance: 50,000; Referee: Jan Wegereef

21 August 2001 2nd Leg	Bayer Leverkusen	3–0 (3–0 agg.)	Red Star Belgrade	Leverkusen, Germany
20:30	Neuville 13', 60'; Kirsten 30'	Report		Stadium: BayArena; Attendance: 22,500; Referee: Domenico Messina

==== First Group Stage ====
===== Group F =====
Pos	Team	Pld	W	D	L	GF	GA	GD	Pts	Qualification	BAR	LEV	LYO	FEN
1	(Spain) Barcelona	6	5	0	1	12	5	+7	15	Advance to second group stage	—	2–1	2–0	1–0
2	(Germany) Bayer Leverkusen	6	4	0	2	10	9	+1	12	Advance to second group stage	2–1	—	2–4	2–1
3	(France) Lyon	6	3	0	3	10	9	+1	9	Transfer to UEFA Cup	2–3	0–1	—	3–1
4	(Turkey) Fenerbahçe	6	0	0	6	3	12	−9	0		0–3	1–2	0–1	—

Source: RSSSF

18 September 2001 1	Olympique Lyonnais	0–1	Bayer Leverkusen	Lyon, France
20:45		Report	Kirsten 75'	Stadium: Stade de Gerland; Attendance: 37,006; Referee: Graziano Cesari

25 September 2001 2	Bayer Leverkusen	2–1	FC Barcelona	Leverkusen, Germany
20:45	Baştürk 52'; Neuville 69'	Report	Luis Enrique 22'	Stadium: BayArena; Attendance: 22,500; Referee: Hugh Dallas

10 October 2001 3	Bayer Leverkusen	2–1	Fenerbahçe SK	Leverkusen, Germany
20:45	Lúcio 35'; Ballack 59'	Report	Revivo 6'	Stadium: BayArena; Attendance: 22,500; Referee: Alain Hamer

17 October 2001 4	FC Barcelona	2–1	Bayer Leverkusen	Barcelona, Spain
20:45	Kluivert 12'; Luis Enrique 38'	Report	Ramelow 32'	Stadium: Camp Nou; Attendance: 75,000; Referee: Pierluigi Collina

23 October 2001 5	Fenerbahçe SK	1–2	Bayer Leverkusen	Istanbul, Turkey
20:45	Oktay 40'	Report	Bernd Schneider 23'; Kirsten 34'	Stadium: Şükrü Saracoğlu Stadium; Attendance: 13,000; Referee: Terje Hauge

31 October 2001 6	Bayer Leverkusen	2–4	Olympique Lyonnais	Leverkusen, Germany
20:45	Sebescen 45+2'; Berbatov 52'	Report	Carrière 32', 38'; Née 64'; Govou 81'	Stadium: BayArena; Attendance: 22,500; Referee: Valentin Ivanov

==== Second Group Stage ====
===== Group D =====
Pos	Team	Pld	W	D	L	GF	GA	GD	Pts	Qualification	LEV	DEP	ARS	JUV
1	(Germany) Bayer Leverkusen	6	3	1	2	11	11	0	10	Advance to knockout stage	—	3–0	1–1	3–1
2	(Spain) Deportivo La Coruña	6	3	1	2	7	6	+1	10	Advance to knockout stage	1–3	—	2–0	2–0
3	(England) Arsenal	6	2	1	3	8	8	0	7		4–1	0–2	—	3–1
4	(Italy) Juventus	6	2	1	3	7	8	−1	7		4–0	0–0	1–0	—

Source: RSSSF

29 November 2001 1	Juventus	4–0	Bayer Leverkusen	Turin, Italy
15:00	Trezeguet 8', 60'; Del Piero 37'; Tudor 44'	Report		Stadium: Stadio delle Alpi; Attendance: 4,926; Referee: Urs Meier

4 December 2001 2	Bayer Leverkusen	3–0	Deportivo La Coruña	Leverkusen, Germany
20:45	Zé Roberto 64'; Neuville 67'; Ballack 79'	Report		Stadium: BayArena; Attendance: 22,500; Referee: Kyros Vassaras

19 February 2002 3	Bayer Leverkusen	1–1	Arsenal	Leverkusen, Germany
20:45	Kirsten 90'	Report	Pires 56'	Stadium: BayArena; Attendance: 22,500; Referee: Alain Sars

27 February 2002 4	Arsenal	4–1	Bayer Leverkusen	London, England
20:45	Pires 5'; Henry 7'; Vieira 48'; Bergkamp 83'	Report	Sebescen 86'	Stadium: Highbury; Attendance: 35,019; Referee: Alain Hamer

12 March 2002 5	Bayer Leverkusen	3–1	Juventus	Leverkusen, Germany
20:45	Butt 24' (pen.); Brdarić 71'; Babić 90+1'	Report	Tudor 61'	Stadium: BayArena; Attendance: 22,500; Referee: Kim Milton Nielsen

20 March 2002 6	Deportivo La Coruña	1–3	Bayer Leverkusen	A Coruña, Spain
20:45	Tristán 75'	Report	Ballack 34'; Schneider 54'; Neuville 86'	Stadium: Estadio Riazor; Attendance: 23,532; Referee: Valentin Ivanov

==== Knockout round ====
===== Quarter-final =====
3 April 2002 1st Leg	Liverpool	1–0	Bayer Leverkusen	Liverpool, England
20:45	Hyypiä 44'	Report		Stadium: Anfield; Attendance: 42,454; Referee: Anders Frisk

9 April 2002 2nd Leg	Bayer Leverkusen	4–2 (4–3 agg.)	Liverpool	Leverkusen, Germany
20:45	Ballack 16', 64'; Berbatov 68'; Lúcio 84'	Report	42' Xavier; 79' Litmanen	Stadium: BayArena; Attendance: 22,500; Referee: Vitor Manuel Melo Pereira

===== Semi-final =====
24 April 2002 1st Leg	Manchester United	2–2	Bayer Leverkusen	Manchester, England
20:45	Solskjær 29' van Nistelrooy 67' (pen.)	Report	62' Ballack; 75' Neuville	Stadium: Old Trafford; Attendance: 68,000; Referee: Lubos Michel

30 April 2002 2nd Leg	Bayer Leverkusen	1–1 (3–3 agg.)	Manchester United	Leverkusen, Germany
20:45	45' Neuville	Report	28' Keane	Stadium: BayArena; Attendance: 22,500; Referee: Kim Milton Nielsen

===== Final =====
15 May 2002 Final	Bayer Leverkusen	1–2	Real Madrid	Glasgow, Scotland
20:45	Lúcio 14'	Report	9' Raúl; 45' Zidane	Stadium: Hampden Park; Attendance: 51,567; Referee: Urs Meier

== Statistics ==
=== Top scorers ===
Rank	No.	Pos	Nat	Name	Bundesliga	DFB-Pokal	Premiere Ligapokal	Champions League	Total
1	13	MF	(Germany)	Michael Ballack	17	0	0	6	23
2	27	FW	(Germany)	Oliver Neuville	13	1	1	7	22
3	9	FW	(Germany)	Ulf Kirsten	11	3	0	4	18
4	12	FW	(Bulgaria)	Dimitar Berbatov	8	6	0	2	16
5	25	MF	(Germany)	Bernd Schneider	5	2	0	2	9
6	19	DF	(Brazil)	Lúcio	4	1	0	3	8
7	8	MF	(Brazil)	Zé Roberto	4	0	0	1	5
7	26	DF	(Germany)	Zoltán Sebescen	3	0	0	2	5
9	10	MF	(Turkey)	Yıldıray Baştürk	3	0	0	1	4
10	1	GK	(Germany)	Hans-Jörg Butt	2	0	0	1	3
10	6	DF	(Croatia)	Boris Živković	2	1	0	0	3
10	23	DF	(Germany)	Thomas Brdarić	1	1	0	1	3
10	28	MF	(Germany)	Carsten Ramelow	2	0	0	1	3
14	3	DF	(Croatia)	Marko Babić	0	0	0	1	1
14	35	DF	(Argentina)	Diego Placente	1	0	0	0	1
Own goal					1	1	0	0	2
Totals					77	16	1	32	126

== Kits ==
Home	Home alt.	Home alt. 2	Away	Third	Cup Final	Goalkeeper	Goalkeeper	Goalkeeper
