= 2015 FC Goa season =

2015 season of FC Goa

FC Goa
2015 season
- President: Dattaraj Salgaocar
- Head Coach: Zico
- Stadium: Fatorda Stadium
- ISL: 1st
- ISL Finals: Runners Up
- Top goalscorer: League: Reinaldo (7); All: Reinaldo (7)
- Highest home attendance: 19,438
- Lowest home attendance: 17,634
- Average home league attendance: 18,571
Home colours	Away colours

The 2015 season was FC Goa's second season in existence in the Indian Super League.

== Background ==
Brazil's No 10 Zico returned as FC Goa manager for the Indian Super League's second season. Former Brazil skipper and World Cup winner Lucio has signed up as FC Goa's marquee player for the second season. Players retained in the team include- Domestic: Romeo Fernandes, Mandar Rao Desai, Laxmikant Kattimani, Narayan Das, Debabrata Roy, Bikramjit Singh. International: Gregory Arnolin (FRA). Players from the open market include- Domestic: Pronay Halder, C S Sabeeth, Denson Devadas, Joaquim Abranches, Raju Gaikwad, Keenan Almeida, Nicolau Colaco, Luis Barreto. International: Jofre Mateu González (ESP), Lucio (BRA), Elinton Andrade (BRA), Reinaldo Da Cruz Oliveira (BRA), Victor Simões de Oliveira (BRA), Jonatan Lucca (BRA), Léo Moura (BRA). Players selected from draft include forwards Victorino Fernandes and Thongkhosiem Haokip.

FC Goa will play its opening match on its home turf on 4 October with the Delhi Dynamos FC.

== Season summary ==
4 October: FC Goa rode on two first half goals scored by Mandar Rao Dessai (3’) and Reinaldo da Cruz Oliveira (45+3’) to beat Delhi Dynamos FC in their opening fixture of the league stage that began with three back to back matches at their home fortress. 7 October: FC Goa came back brilliantly to hold Atletico de Kokata to a 1–1 draw as Keenan Almeida (82’) scored a stunner after Arata Izumi (13’) had given Antonio Lopes Habas’ side the lead in a fiery tie that saw the sending off of Baljit Sahni (62’). 11 October: A result to forget was the first defeat in this season. FC Goa went down to 4–0 defeat at the hands of Chennaiyin FC in Match 9 where Elano Blumer, who scored in the 43rd minute, assisted two of Stiven Mendoza's goals in the Colombian's hat-trick (10’, 63’, 75’). 15 October: The Gaurs got their ISL campaign back on track with an emphatic 3–1 victory over NorthEast United FC at the Indira Gandhi Athletic Stadium in Guwahati. After Francis Dadzie scored the 12th-minute opener, Jonatan Lucca (27’), Reinaldo (30’) and Mandar (70’) completed the comeback for FC Goa. 22 October: FC Goa came from behind once again and reclaimed the top spot with a 2–1 win over Kerala Blasters FC as Leo Moura (45+1’) cancelled Mohammed Rafi's 24th-minute lead while Gregory Arnolin sealed the victory in the 84th minute. 25 October: The winning run came to a halt after Mumbai City FC registered a 2–0 win over the league leaders in Mumbai. In what was FC Goa striker Darryl Duffy's last match of the season where the Scot was ruled out due to a hairline fracture, Sunil Chhetri's penalty (33’) and Frederic Piquonne's header (49’) were enough to give the home team all three points. 30 October: The Virat Kohli co-owned FC Goa remained afloat in the top half with a 1–1 draw against FC Pune City in which an own goal scored by Roger Johnson (46’) was cancelled by Eugeneson Lyngdoh in the 64th minute. 5 November: FC Goa gifted Virat Kohli with a 2–0 win over Chennaiyin FC. On his debut, Rafael Coelho Luiz won both the penalties that were converted by Leo Moura (64’) and Jonatan Lucca (78’) as the Gaurs recorded their second away win of the season. Harmanjot Khabra was sent off in the 89th minute wherein the Chennaiyin player put his studs on Moura's right leg. 8 November: As it almost looked as a win for the league leaders, Adrian Mutu (90+4’) handed the Goan franchise with a heartbreaker at the death. In the thrilling round nine clash, Eugeneson Lyngdoh had bagged the opener in the 32nd minute. Rafael (34’) and Jonatan Lucca (44’) brought FC Goa back into the game but for the unthinkable to happen at the last minute. 17 November: FC Goa hammered Mumbai City FC 7–0 to record the biggest victory in the history of the competition. Thongkhosiem Haokip (34’, 52’, 79’) and Dudu Omagbemi (42’, 64’, 67’) scored more than just their first goals in FC Goa colours, with former bagging the 100th goal in the ISL 2015, while Reinaldo (90’) scored his third of the season. 22 November: FC Goa have not only remained winless against Atletico de Kolkata but also lost 4–0 to the ISL 2014 champions. Sameehg Doutie (20’, 78’), Borja Fernandez (22’) and Iain Hume (68’) were the scorers for this season's semifinalists. 25 November: It was the last home match of the season for FC Goa in the league stage where Zico's troops came from behind to hold NorthEast United FC 1–1 and Leo Moura bagged the "DHL winning pass" award for the most number of assists (6, now 8) provided for his side in the ISL this year. Victor Mendy's 56th-minute goal was cancelled by Reinaldo in the 80th minute. 29 November: FC Goa blasted their way into semifinals thrashing Kerala Blasters FC 5–1. The Blasters’ second-minute lead scored by Victor Herrero Forcada was annulled by Jofre Mateu Gonzalez in the 12th minute. The Gaurs also had their third hat-trick hero in Reinaldo da Cruz Oliveira (29’, 50’, 61’) while Mandar Rao Dessai (64’) joined the party to ensure a comfortable win. The home team had to play the second half with 10 men following the sending off of Josu Carrias. 6 December: Having already made it to the final four, FC Goa rallied back from two goals down at half-time to beat Delhi Dynamos FC 3–2 in an exciting clash and finished on top of the standings at the end of the league stage, drawing the same opponents in the semifinals. Serginho Green (31’) and Adil Nabi (40’) gave the Lions a 2–0 lead in the first half but the away team scored three goals in the second half via a brace scored by Romeo Fernandes (68’, 69’) and Jofre Mateu Gonzalez (90’) to snatch all three points. 11 December: FC Goa succumbed a 1–0 loss to Delhi Dynamos FC in the first leg of the semifinals in Delhi. Robin Singh's 42nd-minute goal made the difference as the two teams headed into the second leg of the semifinals in Goa on 15 December with the Delhi franchise leading 1–0 on aggregate. 15 December: FC Goa scripted their maiden final appearance crushing Delhi Dynamos FC 3–0 in the second leg of their semifinal. Jofre Mateu Gonzalez (11’), Rafael Coelho Luiz (27’) and Dudu Omagbemi (84’) were the goalscoring heroes for the Goan franchise who were backed by a deafening home support. Adil Nabi was given the marching orders by referee Pranjal Banerjee due to the Delhi player's indiscipline on the bench after he was already substituted.

== Pre Season Friendly ==
11 September 2015 Exhibition match	FC Goa (India)	2–2	(United Arab Emirates) Al Khaleej	Dubai, UAE

15 September 2015 Exhibition match	FC Goa (India)	2–1	(United Arab Emirates) Al Shabab	Dubai, UAE

16 September 2015 Exhibition match	FC Goa (India)	1–1	(United Arab Emirates) Ajman Club	Dubai, UAE

19 September 2015 Exhibition match	FC Goa (India)	–	(United Arab Emirates) Al Jazira	Dubai, UAE

20 September 2015 Exhibition match	FC Goa (India)	2–4	(United Arab Emirates) Hatta Club	Dubai, UAE

28 September 2015 Exhibition match	FC Goa (India)	3–1	(India) Dempo SC	Goa, India

== Transfers ==
In: Note: Flags indicate national team as defined under FIFA eligibility rules; some limited exceptions apply. Players may hold more than one non-FIFA nationality.

No.	Pos.	Nation	Player
1	GK	IND	Luis Barreto (from (India) East Bengal)
2	DF	IND	Debabrata Roy (loan from (India) Dempo)
3	DF	BRA	Lúcio (from (Brazil) Palmeiras)
4	MF	BRA	Luciano Sabrosa (from (India) Pune)
5	DF	IND	Narayan Das (loan from (India) Dempo)
6	DF	IND	Raju Gaikwad (loan from (India) Mohun Bagan)
7	FW	BRA	Victor Simões (from (Qatar) Umm Salal)
8	MF	IND	Bikramjit Singh (from (India) Mohun Bagan)
9	FW	SCO	Darryl Duffy (loan from (India) Salgaocar)
10	MF	BRA	Léo Moura (from (United States) Fort Lauderdale Strikers)
11	FW	BRA	Reinaldo (from (Brazil) Inter de Lages)
12	FW	IND	Thongkhosiem Haokip (loan from (India) Pune)
13	MF	IND	Denson Devadas (from (India) Chennaiyin)
14	FW	IND	Victorino Fernandes (loan from (India) Sporting Goa)
16	DF	IND	Nicolau Colaco (loan from (India) Salgaocar)
17	MF	IND	Mandar Rao Desai (loan from (India) Dempo)
18	MF	IND	Pronay Halder (loan from (India) Dempo)
19	MF	IND	Romeo Fernandes (loan from (India) Dempo)
20	FW	BRA	Rafael Coelho (from (Thailand) Buriram United)
22	MF	ESP	Jofre (from (India) Atlético de Kolkata)
23	DF	IND	Keenan Almeida (from (India) Sporting Goa)
25	FW	NGR	Dudu Omagbemi (from (India) Atlético de Kolkata)
27	GK	IND	Laxmikant Kattimani (loan from (India) Dempo)
30	FW	IND	Chinadorai Sabeeth (loan from (India) East Bengal)
47	MF	BRA	Jonatan Lucca (loan from (Brazil) Atlético Paranaense)
71	FW	IND	Joaquim Abranches (loan from (India) East Bengal)
99	GK	BRA	Elinton Andrade (from (Brazil) Duque de Caxias)

Out: Note: Flags indicate national team as defined under FIFA eligibility rules; some limited exceptions apply. Players may hold more than one non-FIFA nationality.

No.	Pos.	Nation	Player
1	GK	CZE	Jan Šeda (loan return to (Czech Republic) Mladá Boleslav)
4	DF	IND	Rowilson Rodrigues (loan return to (India) Dempo)
5	DF	FRA	Youness Bengelloun (to (Belgium) White Star Bruxelles)
6	MF	IND	Peter Carvalho (loan return to (India) Dempo)
7	MF	FRA	Robert Pires (Retired)
7	FW	BRA	Victor Simões
8	MF	IND	Alwyn George (loan return to (India) Dempo)
9	FW	POR	Miguel Herlein (to (United States) New York Cosmos)
9	FW	SCO	Darryl Duffy (loan return to (India) Salgaocar)
10	FW	POR	Edgar Marcelino (to (India) Pune)
11	FW	IND	Holicharan Narzary (loan return to (India) Dempo)
14	MF	IND	Gabriel Fernandes (loan return to (India) Dempo)
16	DF	POR	Bruno Pinheiro (to (Greece) Apollon Smyrnis)
18	DF	AFG	Zohib Islam Amiri (loan return to (India) Dempo)
20	FW	CZE	Miroslav Slepička
22	DF	IND	Prabir Das (loan return to (India) Dempo)
23	MF	IND	Jewel Raja (loan return to (India) Dempo)
24	MF	IND	Clifford Miranda (loan return to (India) Dempo)
25	FW	NGR	Ranti Martins (loan return to (India) East Bengal)
26	FW	AUS	Tolgay Özbey (loan return to (India) Dempo)
27	DF	BRA	André Santos (to (Brazil) Botafogo de Ribeirão Preto)

== Players and Staff ==
=== Current squad ===
As of 11 November 2015

Note: Flags indicate national team as defined under FIFA eligibility rules; some limited exceptions apply. Players may hold more than one non-FIFA nationality.

No.	Pos.	Nation	Player
1	GK	IND	Luis Barreto
2	DF	IND	Debabrata Roy (on loan from Dempo)
3	DF	BRA	Lúcio
4	DF	BRA	Luciano Sabrosa
5	DF	IND	Narayan Das (on loan from Dempo)
6	DF	IND	Raju Gaikwad (on loan from Mohun Bagan)
8	MF	IND	Bikramjit Singh (on loan from Mohun Bagan)
10	MF	BRA	Léo Moura
11	FW	BRA	Reinaldo
12	FW	IND	Thongkhosiem Haokip (on loan from Pune)
13	MF	IND	Denson Devadas
14	FW	IND	Victorino Fernandes (on loan from Sporting Goa)
15	DF	MTQ	Grégory Arnolin

No.	Pos.	Nation	Player
16	DF	IND	Nicolau Colaco (on loan from Salgaocar)
17	MF	IND	Mandar Rao Desai (on loan from Dempo)
18	MF	IND	Pronay Halder (on loan from Dempo)
19	MF	IND	Romeo Fernandes (on loan from Dempo)
20	FW	BRA	Rafael Coelho
22	MF	ESP	Jofre
23	DF	IND	Keenan Almeida (on loan from Sporting Goa)
25	FW	NGR	Dudu Omagbemi
27	GK	IND	Laxmikant Kattimani (on loan from Dempo)
30	FW	IND	Chinadorai Sabeeth (on loan from East Bengal)
47	MF	BRA	Jonatan Lucca (on loan from Atletico Paranaense)
71	FW	IND	Joaquim Abranches (on loan from East Bengal)
99	GK	BRA	Elinton Andrade

=== Injured ===
Note: Flags indicate national team as defined under FIFA eligibility rules; some limited exceptions apply. Players may hold more than one non-FIFA nationality.

No.	Pos.	Nation	Player
7	FW	BRA	Victor Simões
9	FW	SCO	Darryl Duffy

=== Current Technical Staff ===
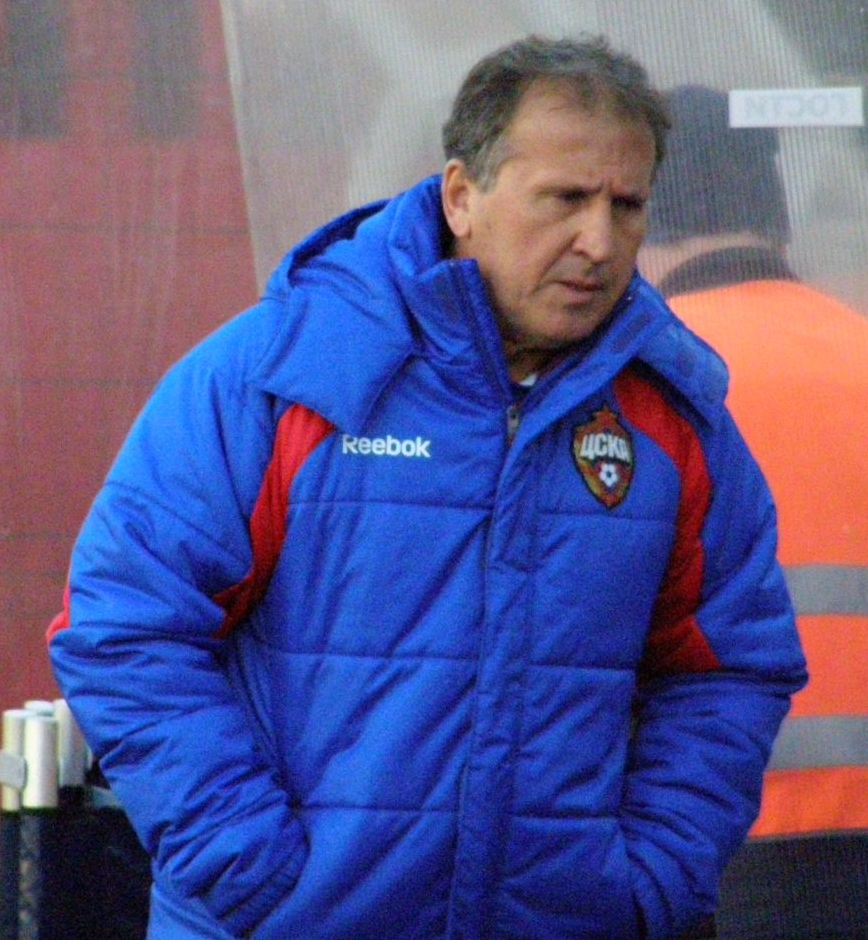
Zico-The Head Coach of FC Goa

Position	Name
Head coach	(Brazil) Zico
Assistant coach	(Brazil) Vannucci Fernando
Conditioning Coach	(Brazil) Moraci Sant'Anna
Physical Trainer	(Brazil) Goncalves Willian
Physiotherapist	(Brazil) Gabriel Miguel
Assistant Physiotherapist	(India) Russell Pinto
Assistant Physiotherapist	(India) R Venkatesh
Team Manager	(India) Jonathan D'Sousa
Head of Youth Development	(India) Gavin Araujo

== Indian Super League ==
=== First round ===
==== League table ====
Pos	Team	Pld	W	D	L	GF	GA	GD	Pts	Qualification or relegation
1	Goa	14	7	4	3	29	20	+9	25	Advance to ISL Play-offs
2	Atlético de Kolkata	14	7	2	5	26	17	+9	23	Advance to ISL Play-offs
3	Chennaiyin (C)	14	7	1	6	25	15	+10	22	Advance to ISL Play-offs
4	Delhi Dynamos	14	6	4	4	18	20	−2	22	Advance to ISL Play-offs
5	NorthEast United	14	6	2	6	18	23	−5	20	

Source: Indian Super League standings
Rules for classification: 1) points; 2) goal difference; 3) number of goals scored.
(C) Champions

==== Results summary ====
Overall								Home						Away					
Pld	W	D	L	GF	GA	GD	Pts	W	D	L	GF	GA	GD	W	D	L	GF	GA	GD
14	7	4	3	28	19	+9	25	3	3	1	13	7	+6	4	1	2	15	12	+3

Last updated: 6 December 2015.
Source: Matches

==== Results by round ====
Round	1	2	3	4	5	6	7	8	9	10	11	12	13	14
Ground	H	H	H	A	H	A	H	A	A	H	A	H	A	A
Result	W	D	L	W	W	L	D	W	D	W	L	D	W	W

Updated to match(es) played on 6 December 2015. Source: Matches
A = Away; H = Home; W = Win; D = Draw; L = Loss

==== Matches ====
4 October 2015 1	Goa	2–0	Delhi Dynamos	Goa
19:00 IST (UTC+5:30)	Chakraborty 3' (o.g.); Reinaldo 45+3'; Jofre (yellow card) 68'; Sabrosa (yellow card) 90+3'	Report	Marmentini (yellow card) 68'	Stadium: Fatorda Stadium; Referee: Pranjal Banerji

7 October 2015 2	Goa	1–1	Atlético de Kolkata	Goa
19:00 IST (UTC+5:30)	Devadas (yellow card) 58'; Almeida 81' (yellow card) 90'; Jofre (yellow card) 83'; V.Fernandes (yellow card) 90+5'	Report	Izumi 13'; Borja (yellow card) 42'; Gavilán (yellow card) 45'; Nato (yellow card) 48'; Sahni (yellow card) 61' (red card) 62'; A.Fernandes (yellow card) 84'; Valdo (yellow card) 88'	Stadium: Fatorda Stadium; Referee: Muringothumalil Bhaskaran Santosh Kumar

11 October 2015 3	Goa	0–4	Chennaiyin	Goa
19:00 IST (UTC+5:30)	Moura (yellow card) 30'	Report	Mendoza 10', 63', 75'; Elano 43'; Khabra (yellow card) 49'; Blasi (yellow card) 85'	Stadium: Fatorda Stadium; Attendance: 18,888; Referee: Bhuvana Balasubramaniam

15 October 2015 4	NorthEast United	1–3	Goa	Guwahati
19:00 IST (UTC+5:30)	Hanghal (yellow card) 6'; Dadzie 12'; Kamara (yellow card) 33'; Gurung (yellow card) 90'	Report	Jonatan 28'; Reinaldo 30' (yellow card) 38'; Singh (yellow card) 64'; Desai 70'	Stadium: Indira Gandhi Athletic Stadium

22 October 2014 5	Goa	2–1	Kerala Blasters	Goa
19:00 IST (UTC+5:30)	Sabrosa (yellow card) 40'; Moura 45+1' (yellow card) 89'; Grégory 83'	Report	Rafi 24'; Williams (yellow card) 44'	Stadium: Fatorda Stadium

25 October 2014 6	Mumbai City	2–0	Goa	Mumbai
19:00 IST (UTC+5:30)	Mehta (yellow card) 26'; Chhetri 33' (pen.) (yellow card) 58'; Piquionne 48'; Mawia (yellow card) 52'; Čmovš (yellow card) 71'; Benachour (yellow card) 90'	Report	B.Singh (yellow card) 20'; Gaikwad (yellow card) 32'	Stadium: DY Patil Stadium; Attendance: 23,043; Referee: Ali Shaban

30 October 2015 7	Goa	1–1	Pune City	Goa
19:00 IST (UTC+5:30)	Johnson 46' (o.g.)	Report	Lyngdoh 64' (yellow card) 66'; Uche (yellow card) 66'	Stadium: Fatorda Stadium

5 November 2015 8	Chennaiyin	0–2	Goa	Chennai
19:00 IST (UTC+5:30)	Teferra (yellow card) 45+1'; Mendy (yellow card) 63'; Elano (yellow card) 70'; Wadoo (yellow card) 76'; Khabra (red card) 89'	Report	Sabrosa (yellow card) 16'; Grégory (yellow card) 61'; Moura 64' (pen.); Jonatan 78' (pen.); Colaco (yellow card) 86'	Stadium: Jawaharlal Nehru Stadium

8 November 2015 9	Pune City	2–2	Goa	Pune
19:00 IST (UTC+5:30)	Lyngdoh 32'; Mutu 90+4'	Report	Coelho 34'; Moura (yellow card) 36'; Jonatan 44'	Stadium: Shree Shiv Chhatrapati Sports Complex

17 November 2015 10	Goa	7–0	Mumbai City	Goa
19:00 IST (UTC+5:30)	Haokip 34', 52', 79'; Dudu 42', 64', 67'; Reinaldo 90'	Report		Stadium: Fatorda Stadium

22 November 2015 11	Atlético de Kolkata	4–0	Goa	Kolkata
19:00 IST (UTC+5:30)	Doutie 20', 78'; Borja 22'; Hume 68' (pen.)	Report	Devadas (yellow card) 58'; Colaco (yellow card) 67'; Lúcio (yellow card) 81'	Stadium: Salt Lake Stadium

25 November 2015 12	Goa	1–1	NorthEast United	Goa
19:00 IST (UTC+5:30)	Arnolin (yellow card) 49'; Dudu (yellow card) 73'; Reinaldo 80'	Report	Mendy 55'	Stadium: Fatorda Stadium

29 November 2015 13	Kerala Blasters	1–5	Goa	Kochi
19:00 IST (UTC+5:30)	Pulga 2'; Josu (red card) 45+3'	Report	Jofre 12'; Reinaldo 29', 50', 61'; Desai 64'; Moura (yellow card) 82'	Stadium: Jawaharlal Nehru Stadium

6 December 2015 14	Delhi Dynamos	2–3	Goa	Delhi
19:00 IST (UTC+5:30)	R.Singh (yellow card) 14'; Greene 31'; Nabi 40'; Vinícius (yellow card) 65'; Chakraborty (yellow card) 65'; Lalthlamuana (yellow card) 90+2'	Report	Halder (yellow card) 14'; Lúcio (yellow card) 63'; Fernandes 68', 70'; Jofre 90'	Stadium: Jawaharlal Nehru Stadium

=== Finals ===
11 December 2015 Semifinal 1st leg	Delhi Dynamos	1–0	Goa	Delhi
19:00 IST (UTC+5:30)	Lalthlamuana (yellow card) 14'; R.Singh 42'; Chicão (yellow card) 44'	Report	Reinaldo (yellow card) 59'; Moura (yellow card) 68'	Stadium: Jawaharlal Nehru Stadium

15 December 2015 Semifinal 2nd leg	Goa	3–0 (3–1 agg.)	Delhi Dynamos	Goa
19:00 IST (UTC+5:30)	Jofre 11' (yellow card) 49'; Coelho 27'; Halder (yellow card) 37'; Desai (yellow card) 58'; Jonatan (yellow card) 69'; B.Singh (yellow card) 76'; Dudu 84'	Report	Marmentini (yellow card) 34'; Malsawmtluanga (yellow card) 88'; Nabi (red card) 88'; Mulder (yellow card) 90+3'	Stadium: Fatorda Stadium

==== Final ====
20 December 2015 Final	Goa	2–3	Chennaiyin	Goa
19:00 IST (UTC+5:30)	Haokip 58'; Grégory (yellow card) 60'; Jofre 87' (yellow card) 88'	Report	Wadoo (yellow card) 18'; Pelissari 54'; T.Singh (yellow card) 57'; Kattimani 90' (o.g.); Mendoza 90+1' (yellow card) 90+2'	Stadium: Fatorda Stadium

== Squad statistics ==
As of Match played 20 December 2015

=== Appearances and goals ===
No.	Pos	Nat	Player	Total		Indian Super League		Finals	
No.	Pos	Nat	Player	Apps	Goals	Apps	Goals	Apps	Goals
2	DF	(India) IND	Debabrata Roy	7	0	6+1	0	0	0
3	DF	(Brazil) BRA	Lúcio	14	0	11	0	3	0
4	DF	(Brazil) BRA	Luciano Sabrosa	7	0	5+1	0	0+1	0
5	DF	(India) IND	Narayan Das	9	0	5+3	0	1	0
6	DF	(India) IND	Raju Gaikwad	8	0	6+1	0	1	0
8	MF	(India) IND	Bikramjit Singh	12	0	7+2	0	2+1	0
10	MF	(Brazil) BRA	Léo Moura	16	2	13	2	3	0
11	FW	(Brazil) BRA	Reinaldo	11	7	8+2	7	1	0
12	FW	(India) IND	Thongkhosiem Haokip	6	4	5	3	0+1	1
13	MF	(India) IND	Denson Devadas	8	0	4+3	0	0+1	0
14	MF	(India) IND	Victorino Fernandes	3	0	2+1	0	0	0
15	MF	(Martinique) MTQ	Grégory Arnolin	16	1	13	1	3	0
16	DF	(India) IND	Nicolau Colaco	4	0	2+2	0	0	0
17	MF	(India) IND	Mandar Rao Desai	14	2	8+4	2	2	0
18	MF	(India) IND	Pronay Halder	8	0	4+1	0	3	0
19	MF	(India) IND	Romeo Fernandes	13	2	6+4	2	2+1	0
20	FW	(Brazil) BRA	Rafael Coelho	5	2	2	1	2+1	1
22	MF	(Spain) ESP	Jofre	12	4	8+1	2	3	2
23	DF	(India) IND	Keenan Almeida	4	1	4	1	0	0
25	FW	(Nigeria) NGR	Dudu Omagbemi	7	4	4+1	3	2	1
27	GK	(India) IND	Laxmikant Kattimani	13	0	9+1	0	3	0
30	FW	(India) IND	Chinadorai Sabeeth	8	0	3+4	0	1	0
47	MF	(Brazil) BRA	Jonatan Lucca	16	3	11+2	3	1+2	0
71	FW	(India) IND	Joaquim Abranches	1	0	1	0	0	0
99	GK	(Brazil) BRA	Elinton Andrade	5	0	5	0	0	0
Players who left Goa due to injury during the season:
7	FW	(Brazil) BRA	Victor Simões	0	0	0	0	0	0
9	FW	(Scotland) SCO	Darryl Duffy	4	0	2+2	0	0	0

=== Goal scorers ===
Place	Position	Nation	Number	Name	Indian Super League	Finals	Total
1	FW	(Brazil)	11	Reinaldo	7	0	7
2	FW	(Nigeria)	25	Dudu Omagbemi	3	1	4
2	FW	(India)	12	Thongkhosiem Haokip	3	1	4
2	MF	(Spain)	22	Jofre	2	2	4
5	MF	(Brazil)	47	Jonatan Lucca	3	0	3
6	MF	(Brazil)	10	Léo Moura	2	0	2
6	MF	(India)	17	Mandar Rao Desai	2	0	2
6	MF	(India)	19	Romeo Fernandes	2	0	2
6	FW	(Brazil)	20	Rafael Coelho	1	1	1
6				Own goal	2	0	2
11	DF	(India)	23	Keenan Almeida	1	0	1
11	DF	(Martinique)	15	Grégory Arnolin	1	0	1
				TOTALS	29	5	34

=== Disciplinary record ===
Number	Nation	Position	Name	Indian Super League		Finals		Total	
Number	Nation	Position	Name	Yellow card	Red card	Yellow card	Red card	Yellow card	Red card
3	(Brazil)	DF	Lúcio	2	0	0	0	2	0
4	(Brazil)	DF	Luciano Sabrosa	3	0	0	0	3	0
6	(India)	DF	Raju Gaikwad	1	0	0	0	1	0
8	(India)	MF	Bikramjit Singh	2	0	1	0	3	0
10	(Brazil)	MF	Léo Moura	4	0	1	0	5	0
11	(Brazil)	MF	Reinaldo	1	0	1	0	2	0
13	(India)	MF	Denson Devadas	2	0	0	0	2	0
14	(India)	MF	Victorino Fernandes	1	0	0	0	1	0
15	(France)	DF	Grégory Arnolin	2	0	1	0	3	0
16	(India)	DF	Nicolau Colaco	2	0	0	0	2	0
17	(India)	MF	Mandar Rao Desai	0	0	1	0	1	0
18	(India)	MF	Pronay Halder	1	0	1	0	2	0
22	(Spain)	MF	Jofre	2	0	2	0	4	0
23	(India)	MF	Keenan Almeida	1	0	0	0	1	0
25	(Nigeria)	FW	Dudu Omagbemi	1	0	0	0	1	0
47	(Brazil)	MF	Jonatan Lucca	0	0	1	0	1	0
			TOTALS	23	0	9	0	32	0
