= Lúcio =

Brazilian footballer

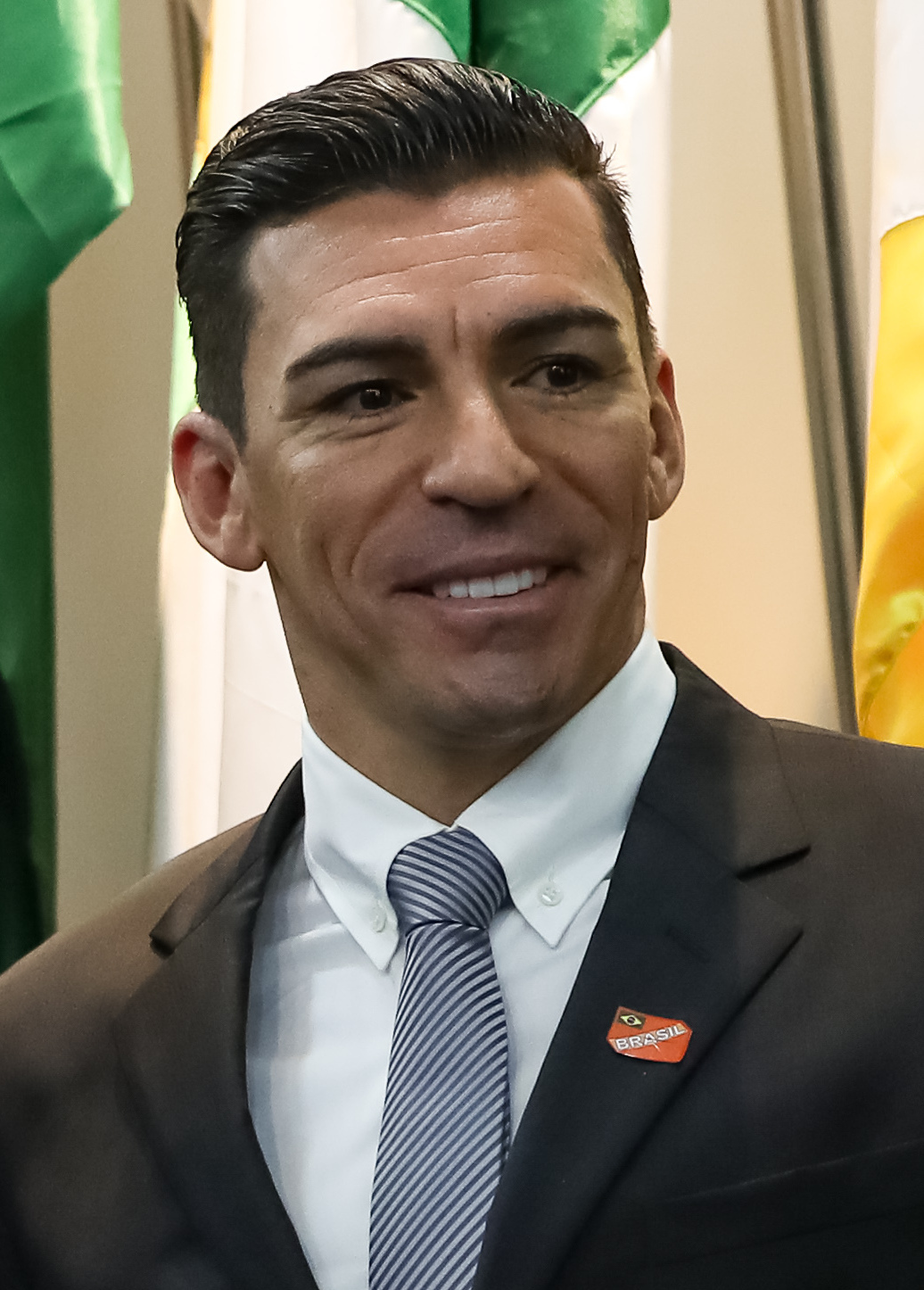
- Lúcio in 2019

Personal information
- Full name: Lucimar Ferreira da Silva
- Date of birth: 8 May 1978 (age 48)
- Place of birth: Planaltina, Federal District, Brazil
- Height: 1.88 m (6 ft 2 in)
- Position: Centre-back

Youth career
- 1995–1997: Planaltina EC

Senior career*
Years	Team	Apps	(Gls)
1997	Guará	0	(0)
1997–2000	Internacional	45	(5)
2001–2004	Bayer Leverkusen	92	(15)
2003	Bayer Leverkusen II	1	(0)
2004–2009	Bayern Munich	144	(7)
2009–2012	Inter Milan	96	(3)
2012	Juventus	1	(0)
2013	São Paulo	10	(1)
2014–2015	Palmeiras	25	(2)
2015–2016	FC Goa	16	(0)
2018	Gama	0	(0)
2018–2020	Brasiliense	17	(1)
Total		447	(34)

International career
2000–2011	Brazil	105	(4)
Medal record
Men's Football
Representing Brazil
FIFA World Cup
Winner	2002 Korea/Japan
FIFA Confederations Cup
Winner	2005 Germany
Winner	2009 South Africa
- * Club domestic league appearances and goals

Lucimar Ferreira da Silva (born 8 May 1978), commonly known as Lúcio (Brazilian Portuguese: [ˈlusju]), is a Brazilian former professional footballer who played as a centre-back. A tall and physically strong defender who excelled in the air, he is regarded as one of the best defenders of his generation. His long, surging, galloping runs on the ball earned him the nickname O Cavalo ("The Horse").

Lúcio began his professional career in 1998 with Internacional. After three years in the club, he moved to Bayer Leverkusen, where he reached the 2002 UEFA Champions League final against Real Madrid, in which he scored the equaliser but lost 2–1. In 2004, he arrived at Bayern Munich, where he won three cups and three Bundesliga titles. Since coach Louis van Gaal did not have a place for him at Bayern, he decided to search for a new team, moving to Inter Milan in the summer of 2009. He won the treble with Inter in 2010, helped them win the 2010 Champions League against his former club Bayern Munich.

With Brazil, Lúcio has accumulated a number of significant accomplishments, winning the 2002 World Cup, 2005 Confederations Cup and 2009 Confederations Cup. After the retirement of Kaká, he was the last active player of the 2002 winning team.

== Club career ==
=== Early career ===
Lúcio started playing football for his hometown club Planaltina as a forward. In 1997, now playing as a defender, he was loaned to Guará, then current Campeonato Brasiliense champions, for their match against Internacional for 1997 Copa do Brasil. Despite a 0–7 home loss, he impressed the Porto Alegre club and was purchased.

=== Internacional ===
At Internacional, Lúcio later became a starting centre-back and had his best year in 2000, receiving his first call-up to the Brazil national team and being awarded the Bola de Prata as one of the two best centre-backs of the 2000 Campeonato Brasileiro.

=== Bayer Leverkusen ===
In January 2001, he moved to Bundesliga side Bayer Leverkusen. He starred as Leverkusen's best defender, helping them finish just behind Bayern in 2002. The following season was bittersweet for Leverkusen, as the club surrendered a five-point lead atop the Bundesliga by losing two of its last three matches while Borussia Dortmund swept ahead with three consecutive victories in the final matches to finish a point ahead of Leverkusen. They also experienced defeat in the 2002 DFB-Pokal Final, losing 4–2 to Schalke 04, and in the 2002 UEFA Champions League final against Real Madrid, in which Lúcio cancelled out Raúl's eighth-minute goal just five minutes later with a header, only for Zinedine Zidane to give Real a 2–1 win with a sublime volley just before half-time. Despite the disappointing end to the season, Lúcio's impressive individual displays drew the attention of several of Europe's top clubs. In July 2003, Roma made an official bid, but the deal fell through.

=== Bayern Munich ===
In 2004, Lúcio joined Bayern Munich on a six-year contract, where he became a vital part of the team. Following Oliver Kahn's retirement in 2008, Dutchman Mark van Bommel was named club captain with Lúcio as vice-captain. When Bayern were playing against Real Madrid in the Round of 16 in the 2006–07 Champions League, Lúcio scored. The goal was in the 66th minute, while the score was 1–0 in favour of Bayern. The goal took Bayern through to the quarter-finals, where they lost to eventual champions Milan. In the 2008–09 DFB-Pokal, he scored in the quarter-finals against his former club, Bayer Leverkusen. Bayern were already down 3–0 when he scored, and even though Miroslav Klose scored again, Lúcio's goal did not matter as Stefan Kießling scored again to win it for Leverkusen 4–2.

=== Inter Milan ===
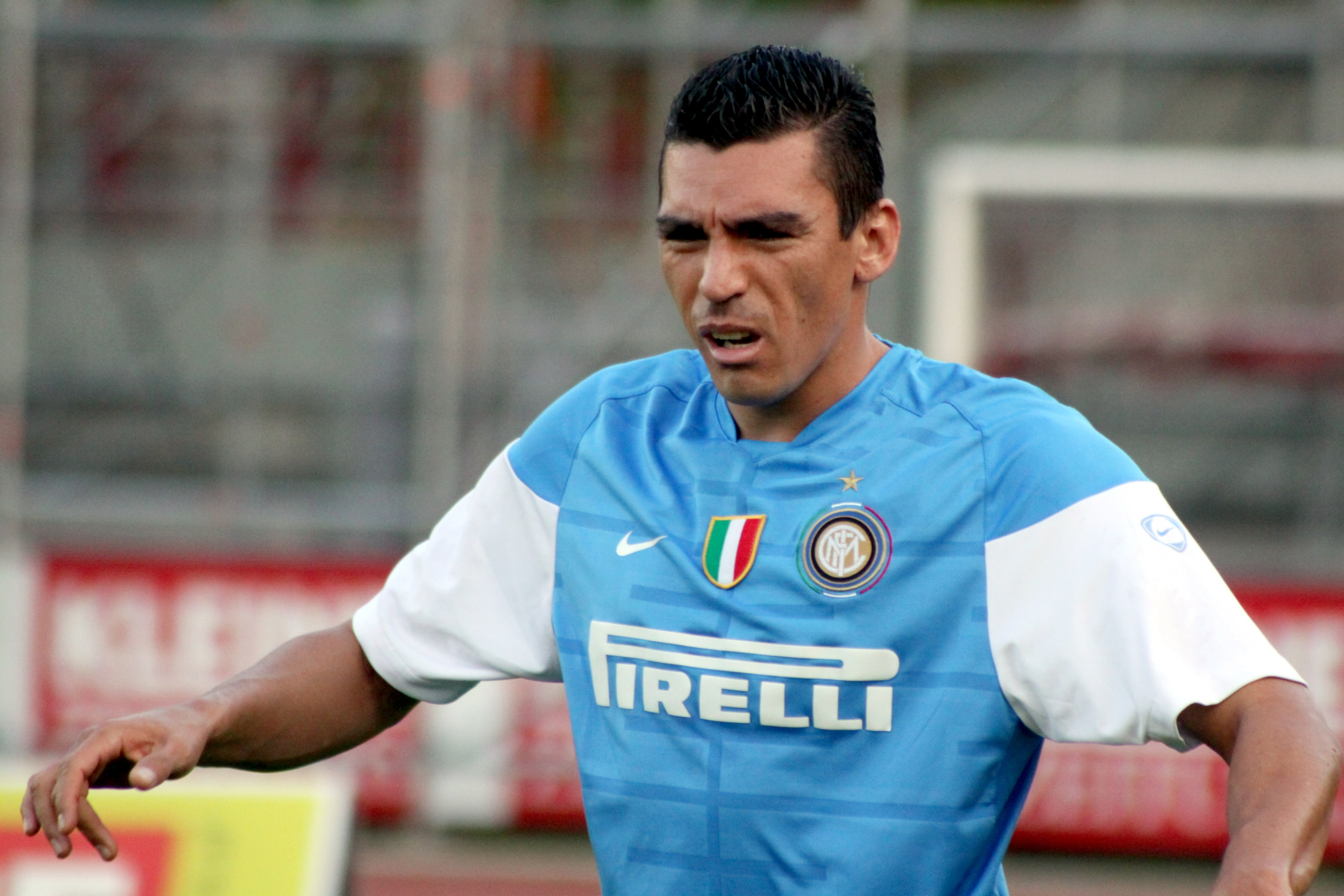
Lúcio playing for Inter in 2009

On 16 July 2009, Lúcio moved to Italian club Inter Milan, signing a three-year contract with the Serie A champions. He was given the number 6 shirt. He scored his first goal with Inter on 23 September 2009 against Napoli with a header from a corner kick. Lúcio also scored an own goal in the UEFA Champions League in the group stages against Dynamo Kyiv, resulting in a draw. Throughout the season, both Lúcio and his defensive partner Walter Samuel drew praise for their performances, and on 22 May, Lúcio was in the Inter team that won the Champions League by defeating his former club Bayern Munich 2–0, to seal a historic treble and end a 45-year wait to be crowned European Champions. He was selected In the FIFA FIFPro World XI of 2010 For His Performances On 24 September 2011, Lúcio made his 100th appearance in an Inter shirt, scoring the third of a 3–1 win at Bologna in Serie A matchday 5. On 29 June 2012, it was announced that Lúcio would be leaving Inter following a mutual agreement to terminate the final two years of his contract.

=== Juventus ===
On 4 July 2012, Lúcio signed a two-year contract with Serie A titleholders Juventus, adding him to the list of players to play for both Inter and Juventus. Although he was initially used as a starter in the club's three-man defence, featuring in Juventus's 4–2 victory over Napoli in the 2012 Supercoppa Italiana on 11 August, after struggling with injuries and producing some inconsistent performances, he was soon left out of the first-team in favour of the defensive trio of Giorgio Chiellini, Leonardo Bonucci and Andrea Barzagli. In total, he made only four appearances in all competitions during his next six months with the club: one in Serie A, two in the Champions League, and one in the Supercoppa Italiana. Due to this lack of playing time, Lúcio left Juventus on 17 December 2012, after his contract was terminated by mutual consent.

=== São Paulo ===
On 18 December 2012, one day after leaving Juventus, Lúcio signed for a two-year contract with Brazilian side São Paulo. After 12 years in Europe, he said that he needed to familiarize himself again with Brazil. He scored his first goal for São Paulo against Botafogo on 7 April 2013.

In July 2013, after a change of coaches in club – Ney Franco was replaced for Paulo Autuori – Lúcio was removed from team. The episode gained traction after the 1–0 loss against Internacional, in a Brazilian League match. Lúcio did not accept Paulo Autuori's criticism, that the Colorado goal, scored by Leandro Damião, would have been scored after a failure from former captain of Seleção Brasileira. This way, reporting an insubordination, Autuori preferred to take off Lúcio from his staff.

After his removal, Lúcio did not travel with the club to Germany to contest the 2013 Audi Cup. His presence at the friendly tournament was requested by his former club Bayern Munich, and without him São Paulo earned €40,000 less than initially accorded. The German side understood the explanations of the directors of the Brazilian club about the insubordination issues, but insisted on São Paulo's performance of contract.

Training apart from the main staff, Lúcio has become a "problem" to the club. He did not accept playing offers from clubs of Middle East and Japan, preferring to stay in Brazil, and did not receive proposals from other Brazilian teams. The directors of Tricolor did not want to sign his rescission, claiming about the high value to do this, however Lúcio was still earning a lucrative salary despite not playing. With defenders Antônio Carlos and Roger Carvalho arriving at the club, Lúcio effectively lost his chance at playing again, prompting efforts from São Paulo to transfer him to a European club before the transfer window closes; they were unsuccessful. In December 2013, after almost six months, Lúcio broke the silence and spoke about his poor relationship with the club: "I felt humiliated. I thought "Oh, my god, what did I do to deserve this?"

=== Palmeiras ===
On 1 January 2014, Lúcio broke his contract with São Paulo (originally to last until December 2014) and signed with Tricolor's rivals Palmeiras. Following the departure of former team captain and centre-back Henrique, an idol for the club, Lúcio will now play a major leadership role on the team's defensive group, alongside goalkeeper and current team captain Fernando Prass. Upon signing his contract, Lúcio agreed to only earn a third of the salary he had in at São Paulo, being further compensated through prizes based on his performance on the field.

=== FC Goa ===
On 7 June 2015, it was confirmed that Lúcio had signed for FC Goa of the Indian Super League as their marquee player. He made 14 appearances in his first season, as FC Goa finished as runners-up of the league. The following season was a lot less successful, with just five appearances from Lúcio and FC Goa finishing at the bottom of the table.

=== Later career ===
On 7 December 2017, Lúcio returned to his home district in Brazil and signed for Gama, captaining the club during the 2018 Campeonato Brasiliense. On 16 April 2018, Lúcio joined rivals Brasiliense.

Lúcio announced his retirement as a professional footballer on 29 January 2020.

== International career ==
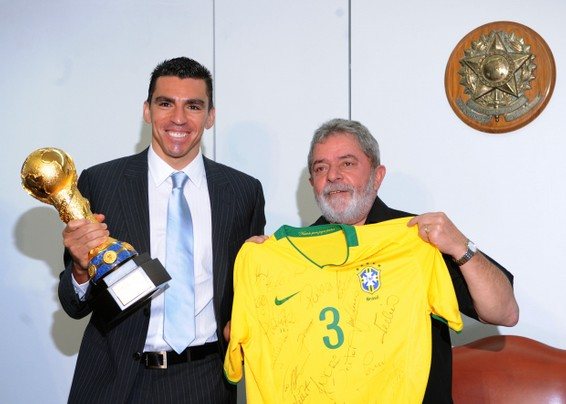
Lúcio and Brazilian President Lula in 2009

=== 2000 Olympics ===
At junior level, he played for Brazil in the football tournament in the 2000 Olympics.

=== 2002 World Cup ===
In the 2002 FIFA World Cup quarter-final match against England, Lúcio made a mistake that allowed Michael Owen to score the opening goal. Luiz Felipe Scolari defended him, stating that he had made no other mistakes. In the final against Germany, Lúcio bore the full brunt of a free-kick, but managed to stay on his feet to complete playing all 630 minutes of the tournament. He was one of four players to do so along with goalkeeper Marcos, right-back captain Cafu, and midfielder Gilberto Silva.

=== 2006 World Cup ===
In the 2006 World Cup, Lúcio set a FIFA record by playing 386 consecutive minutes without committing a foul, a streak which was finally broken in Brazil's 1–0 quarter-final loss to France.

In August 2006, Lúcio was appointed as captain by Brazil manager Dunga.

=== 2009 Confederations Cup ===
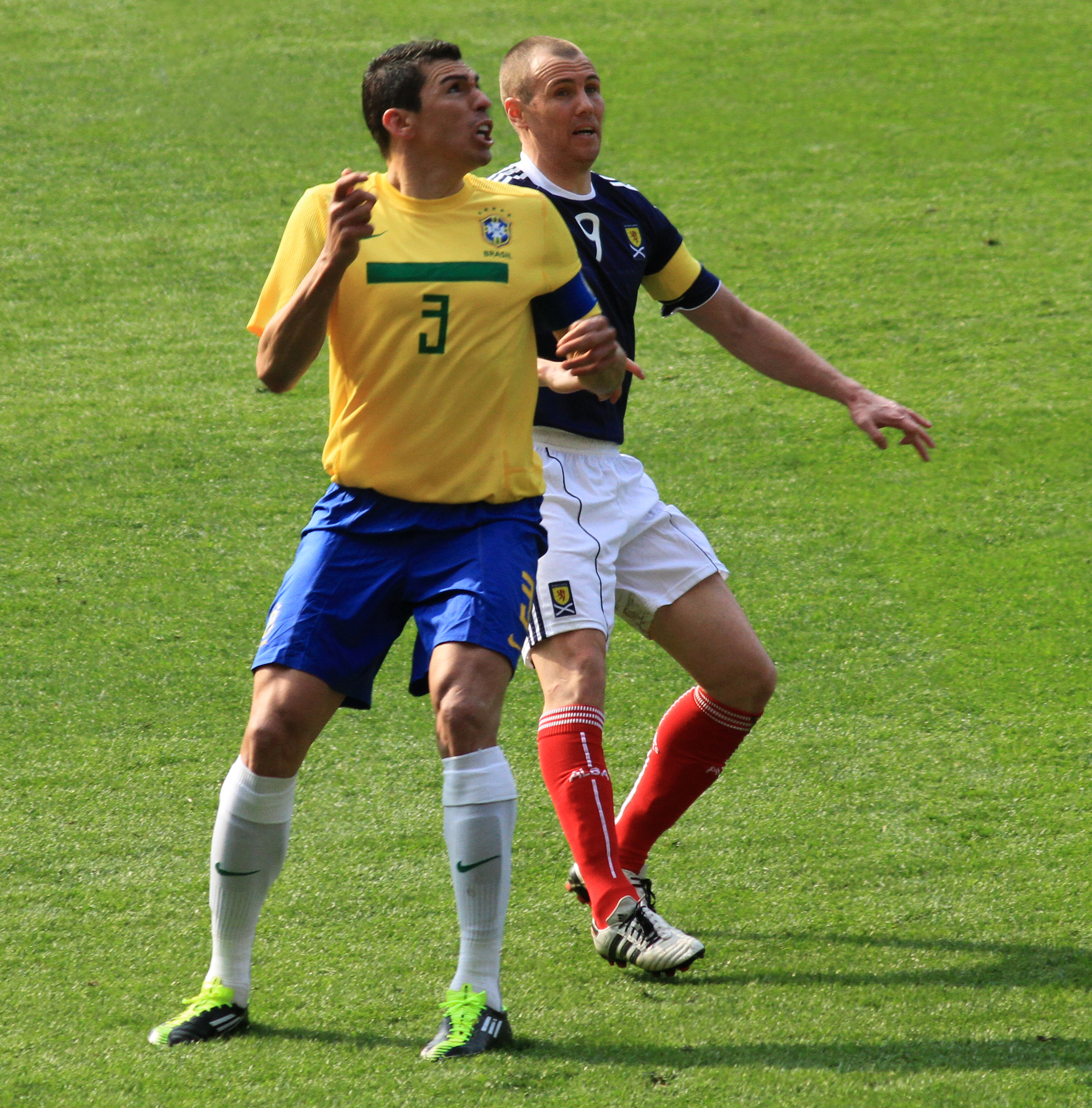
Lúcio playing for Brazil in 2011

Lúcio's next international tournament was 2009 Confederations Cup. On 28 June 2009, the Brazilian captain scored the game-winning goal in the 84th minute for Brazil in the final of the Confederations Cup against the United States. Lúcio converted on a header from an Elano corner-kick, which beat American goalkeeper Tim Howard.

=== 2010 World Cup ===
The 2010 World Cup was Lúcio's third World Cup. He played in the Seleção's first match against North Korea on 15 June 2010, leading his team to a narrow 2–1 win. In the tournament, he partnered Juan in defence. In Group E, Brazil won against the Ivory Coast and played a 0–0 draw against Portugal, which was enough to lead Brazil to the knockout stage. Chile was beaten by Brazil, 3–0, and the Seleção made it to the quarter-finals. There Brazil faced the Netherlands, where Wesley Sneijder scored twice for Netherlands to eliminate Brazil after a 2–1 scoreline.

=== After World Cup 2010 ===
After head coach Dunga was sacked, the Brazil Football Confederation hired Mano Menezes as the side's new head coach. Menezes also had faith in the experienced Lúcio, who kept his starting centre-back role in the team. Even though Lúcio kept his place, his centreback partner Juan was dropped from the Brazilian squad, and Thiago Silva was Lúcio's new partner.

On 4 June 2011, Lúcio played his 100th game for Brazil, which consists of 98 official caps and two unofficial caps in friendly matches against Spanish club Sevilla in 2005 and against Swiss club Luzern in 2006.

=== 2011 Copa América ===
Lúcio was also named in Brazil's squad for 2011 Copa América. Brazil barely survived the group stage and in the quarter-finals the team faced Paraguay, which eliminated Brazil after a penalty shootout.

Towards the end of 2011, Menezes dropped Lúcio from the Brazil's squad, and Robinho became the new team captain. Lúcio made his last appearance for Brazil in September 2011.

== Style of play ==
Regarded as one of the best defenders of his generation, Lúcio was a tall, physically strong defender known for his heavy marking of opponents, hard-tackling play style, and leadership. He was also noted for his positioning, ability to read the game, and effectiveness at winning possession in one-on-one situations. Having technical skills and accurate distribution, he was usually deployed as a centre-back, but was also used as a defensive midfielder, where he demonstrated his skills in possession and ability to play the ball out of defence. While primarily a defensive player, his pace, stamina and dribbling allowed him to move into attacking positions. His long runs on the ball earned him the nickname O Cavalo ("The Horse", in Portuguese). These attributes, combined with his long-range striking and set piece ability with his right foot, made him an additional offensive threat.

== Personal life ==
Lúcio is married to Dione, with whom he has three children: Victoria, João Vítor, and Valentinna. He is an Evangelical Christian, and frequently talks about the way his faith sustains his life in professional football.

== Career statistics ==
=== Club ===
Appearances and goals by club, season and competition
Club	Season	League			State league (Note: Includes Campeonato Gaúcho, Campeonato Paulista)		National cup (Note: Includes Copa do Brasil, DFB-Pokal, Coppa Italia)		Continental		Other		Total	
Club	Season	Division	Apps	Goals	Apps	Goals	Apps	Goals	Apps	Goals	Apps	Goals	Apps	Goals
Guará	1997	—	–				1	0	–		–		1	0
Internacional	1998	Série A	10	0			0	0	–		–		10	0
Internacional	1999	Série A	19	2			2	0	–		–		21	2
Internacional	2000	Série A	16	3			4	0	–		4 (Note: Appearances in Copa João Havelang knock-out stage)	0	24	3
Internacional	Total		45	5			6	0	0	0	4	0	55	5
Bayer Leverkusen	2000–01	Bundesliga	15	5	–		0	0	0	0	0	0	15	5
Bayer Leverkusen	2001–02	Bundesliga	29	4	–		4	1	18 (Note: Appearances in UEFA Champions League)	3	0	0	51	8
Bayer Leverkusen	2002–03	Bundesliga	21	3	–		1	1	6	0	–		28	4
Bayer Leverkusen	2003–04	Bundesliga	27	3	–		1	1	–		–		28	4
Bayer Leverkusen	Total		92	15	–		6	3	24	3	0	0	122	21
Bayer Leverkusen II	2002–03	Regionalliga Nord	1	0	–		–		–		–		1	0
Bayern Munich	2004–05	Bundesliga	32	3	–		6	0	9	0	1 (Note: Appearance(s) in DFB-Ligapokal)	0	48	3
Bayern Munich	2005–06	Bundesliga	30	2	–		5	0	7	0	1	0	43	2
Bayern Munich	2006–07	Bundesliga	26	0	–		2	0	8	2	1	0	37	2
Bayern Munich	2007–08	Bundesliga	24	1	–		6	0	13 (Note: Appearances in UEFA Cup)	2	3	0	46	3
Bayern Munich	2008–09	Bundesliga	32	1	–		4	1	8	0	—		44	2
Bayern Munich	Total		144	7	–		23	1	45	4	6	0	218	12
Inter Milan	2009–10	Serie A	31	1	–		4	1	12	0	1 (Note: Appearance in Supercoppa Italiana)	0	48	2
Inter Milan	2010–11	Serie A	31	1	–		4	0	8	0	4 (Note: One appearance in Supercoppa Italiana, one appearance in UEFA Super Cup, two appearances in FIFA Club World Cup)	0	47	1
Inter Milan	2011–12	Serie A	34	1	–		0	0	7	1	0	0	41	2
Inter Milan	Total		96	3	–		8	1	30	1	5	0	139	5
Juventus	2012–13	Serie A	1	0	–		0	0	2	0	1	0	4	0
São Paulo	2013	Série A	10	1	11	1	0	0	8 (Note: Appearances in Copa Libertadores)	0	2 (Note: Appearances in Recopa Sudamericana)	0	31	2
Palmeiras	2014	Série A	25	2	15	0	7	0	—		—		47	2
Goa	2015	Indian Super League	11	0	—		—		—		3 (Note: Appearances in Indian Super League knockout stage)	0	14	0
Goa	2016	Indian Super League	5	0	—		—		—		—		5	0
Goa	Total		16	0	—		—		—		3	0	19	0
Gama	2018	—	–		7	0	–		–		—		7	0
Brasiliense	2018	Série D	9	1	–		–		–		–		9	1
Brasiliense	2019	Série D	8	0	10	1	1	0	–		3 (Note: Appearances in Copa Verde)	0	22	1
Brasiliense	Total		17	1	10	1	1	0	–		3	0	31	2
Career total			447	34	43	2	52	5	109	8	24	0	675	49

=== International ===
Appearances and goals by national team and year
National team	Year	Apps	Goals
Brazil	2000	1	0
Brazil	2001	12	0
Brazil	2002	11	0
Brazil	2003	9	0
Brazil	2004	2	0
Brazil	2005	13	2
Brazil	2006	10	0
Brazil	2007	8	1
Brazil	2008	8	0
Brazil	2009	14	1
Brazil	2010	8	0
Brazil	2011	9	0
Total		105	4

Scores and results list Brazil's goal tally first, score column indicates score after each Lúcio goal.

List of international goals scored by Lúcio
No.	Date	Venue	Opponent	Score	Result	Competition
1	9 February 2005	Hong Kong Stadium, Hong Kong, China	Hong Kong	1–0	7–1	2005 Carlsberg Cup
2	12 November 2005	Sheikh Zayed Stadium, Abu Dhabi, UAE	United Arab Emirates	4–0	8–0	Friendly match
3	9 September 2007	Soldier Field, Chicago, United States	United States	2–1	4–2	Friendly match
4	28 June 2009	Ellis Park Stadium, Johannesburg, South Africa	United States	3–2	3–2	2009 FIFA Confederations Cup Final

== Honours ==
Bayer Leverkusen

- UEFA Champions League runner-up: 2001–02

Bayern Munich

- Bundesliga: 2004–05, 2005–06, 2007–08
- DFB-Pokal: 2004–05, 2005–06, 2007–08
- DFB-Ligapokal: 2004, 2007

Inter Milan

- Serie A: 2009–10
- Coppa Italia: 2009–10, 2010–11
- Supercoppa Italiana: 2010
- UEFA Champions League: 2009–10
- FIFA Club World Cup: 2010

Juventus

- Supercoppa Italiana: 2012

Goa

- Indian Super League runner-up: 2015

Brazil

- FIFA World Cup: 2002
- FIFA Confederations Cup: 2005, 2009

Individual

- Brazilian Bola de Prata: 2000
- kicker Bundesliga Team of the Season: 2000–01, 2001–02, 2002–03, 2003–04, 2004–05, 2005–06
- ESM Team of the Year: 2001–02, 2005–06, 2009–10
- 2009 FIFA Confederations Cup: Fair Play Award
- 2009 FIFA Confederations Cup: FIFA.com Users' Top 11
- FIFA FIFPro World XI: 2010
- Pirata d'Oro (Internazionale Player of the Year): 2012

== See also ==
- List of footballers with 100 or more caps
