= Marcel Gebhardt =

German footballer

Personal information
- Date of birth: 15 September 1979 (age 47)
- Place of birth: Riesa, Bezirk Dresden, East Germany
- Height: 1.73 m (5 ft 8 in)
- Position: Midfielder

Team information
- Current team: Wormatia Worms (sports director)

Youth career
- TSG Gröditz
- 1992–1995: Dynamo Dresden
- 1995–1998: KFC Uerdingen 05

Senior career*
Years	Team	Apps	(Gls)
1998–2001	1. FC Köln	1	(0)
2001–2002	Wormatia Worms	30	(2)
2002–2003	Lokomotive Leipzig	13	(1)
2003–2010	Wormatia Worms	176	(43)
Total		220	(46)
- * Club domestic league appearances and goals

Marcel Gebhardt (born 15 September 1979) is a German former football player. He made his debut on the professional league level in the 2. Bundesliga for 1. FC Köln on 1 October 1999 when he came on as a substitute for Dirk Lottner in the 73rd minute in a game against SV Waldhof Mannheim.
