= Nicolau Colaco =

Indian footballer

Personal information
- Full name: Nicolau Colaco
- Date of birth: 16 May 1984 (age 42)
- Place of birth: Goa, India
- Height: 1.80 m (5 ft 11 in)
- Position: Defender

Team information
- Current team: Salgaocar

Senior career*
Years	Team	Apps	(Gls)
2009–	Salgaocar		
2015	→ FC Goa (loan)	4	(0)
- * Club domestic league appearances and goals as of 09:30, 4 August 2015 (UTC)

Nicolau Colaco (born 16 May 1984) is an Indian footballer who plays as a defender for FC Goa in the Indian Super League, on loan from I-League club Salgaocar.

== Career ==
Colaco played in 14 I-League matches last season including 5 2012 AFC Cup matches for Salgaocar.

== International ==
On 31 July 2012 it was announced that Colaco was selected into the 37 man squad for the India national football team that would play in the 2012 Nehru Cup at the end of August.

== Career statistics ==
=== Club ===
As of 30 May 2015

Club	Season	League			Cup			AFC			Total		
Club	Season	Apps	Goals	Assists	Apps	Goals	Assists	Apps	Goals	Assists	Apps	Goals	Assists
Salgaocar	2011-12	14	0	2	0	0	0	5	0	1	19	0	3
Salgaocar	2012-13	25	0	1	3	1	0	–	–	–	28	0	1
Salgaocar	2013-14	15	0	0	3	0	0	–	–	–	18	0	0
Salgaocar	2014-15	12	0	0	0	0	0	–	–	–	12	0	0
Career total		66	0	3	6	1	0	5	0	1	77	1	4
