= Nasir El Kasmi =

German-Moroccan footballer

Personal information
- Date of birth: 2 October 1982 (age 44)
- Place of birth: Wuppertal, West Germany
- Height: 1.80 m (5 ft 11 in)
- Position: Midfielder

Youth career
- Fortuna Wuppertal
- Bayer Wuppertal
- Bayer Leverkusen

Senior career*
Years	Team	Apps	(Gls)
2001–2003	Bayer Leverkusen II	58	(3)
2002–2003	Bayer Leverkusen	0	(0)
2003–2006	MSV Duisburg	49	(1)
2006–2007	Holstein Kiel	6	(0)

International career
	Morocco	2	(0)
- * Club domestic league appearances and goals

Nasir El Kasmi (born 2 October 1982) is a retired German-Moroccan footballer who played as a midfielder. He made two appearances for the Morocco national team.

== Career ==
El Kasmi was born in Wuppertal, Germany. He spent two seasons in the Bundesliga with Bayer 04 Leverkusen and MSV Duisburg he only played in league games for Duisburg, however, playing in one DFB-Ligapokal game for Bayer). He also holds German citizenship.
