= Jan Šimák =

Czech footballer

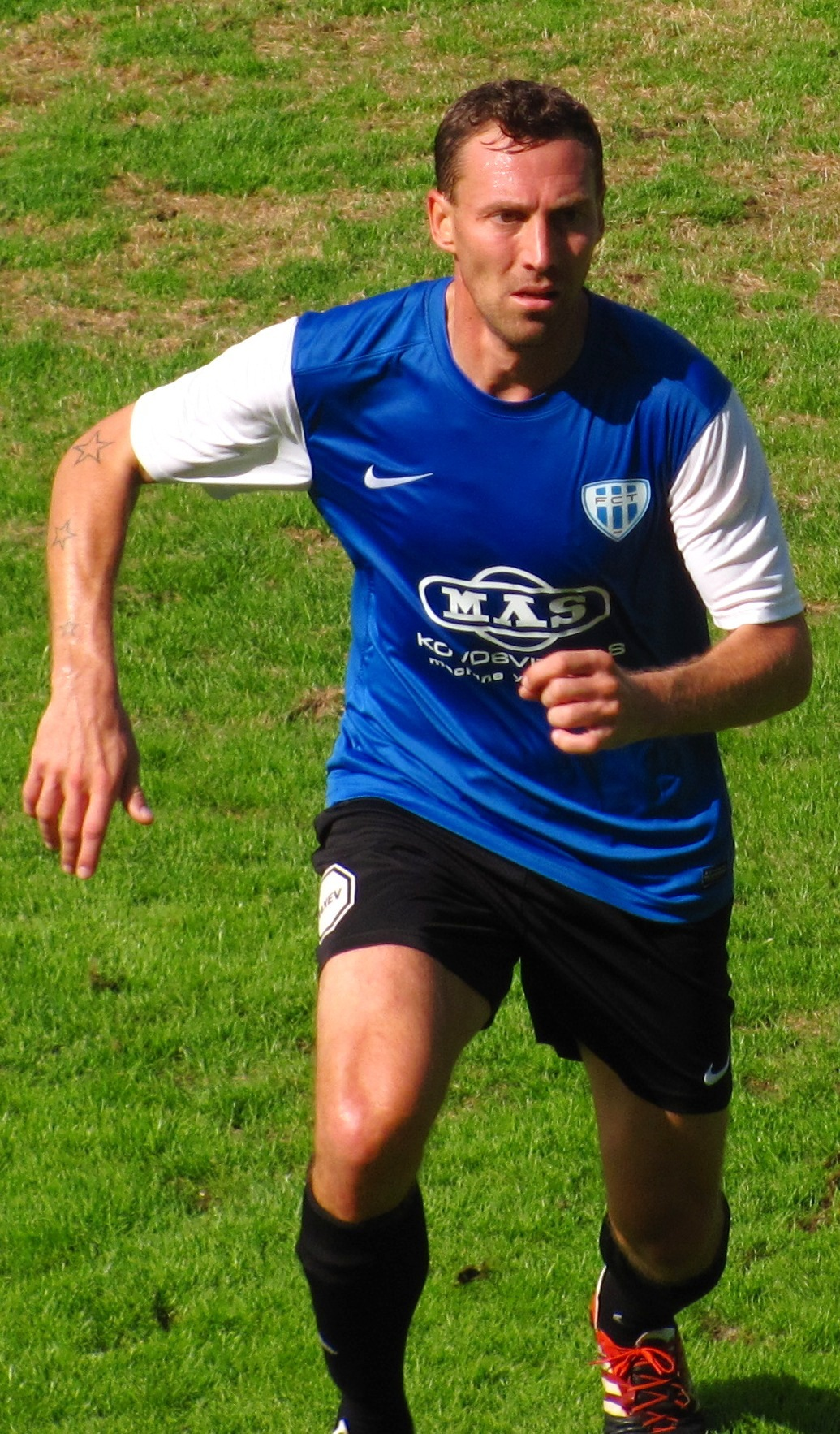
- Šimák in 2012

Personal information
- Date of birth: 13 October 1978 (age 48)
- Place of birth: Tábor, Czechoslovakia
- Height: 1.82 m (6 ft 0 in)
- Position: Attacking midfielder

Youth career
- 1983–1984: Sokol Mezno
- 1984–1996: VS Tábor
- 1994–1995: SK České Budějovice JČE

Senior career*
Years	Team	Apps	(Gls)
1996–2000	Chmel Blšany	99	(16)
2000–2002	Hannover 96	58	(27)
2002–2003	Bayer Leverkusen	22	(3)
2003–2004	→ Hannover 96 (loan)	6	(2)
2004–2007	Sparta Prague	51	(3)
2007–2008	Carl Zeiss Jena	27	(7)
2008–2009	VfB Stuttgart	22	(2)
2010–2011	Mainz 05	9	(1)
2011–2012	Carl Zeiss Jena	28	(8)
2012–2014	Táborsko	49	(9)
2014–2015	Bohemians Prague	2	(0)
2015–2016	Dynamo České Budějovice	24	(6)
Total		397	(84)

International career
2002	Czech Republic	1	(0)
- * Club domestic league appearances and goals

Jan Šimák (born 13 October 1978) is a Czech former professional footballer who played as an attacking midfielder. He spent most of his career in Germany and made one appearance for the Czech Republic national team.

== Career ==
=== Early career ===
Born in Tábor, Šimák began his professional career at Chmel Blšany.

In 2000, Šimák left the Czech Republic joining 2. Bundesliga club Hannover 96. In his second season there, he contributed 18 goals to the club's promotion to the Bundesliga.

In the summer of 2002, Šimák joined Bayer Leverkusen on a five-year contract. The transfer fee paid to Hannover was reported as €6 million. Signed as a replacement for Michael Ballack, he could not prevail at the Rhineland-side and returned the following year on loan to Hannover 96. After the sixth matchday he dropped out because of alcohol problems and a related depression fatigue syndrome. In July 2004, he dissolved his contract in Leverkusen.

=== Return to the Czech Republic ===
A short time later, Šimák returned to his native Czech Republic to play for Sparta Prague. On 28 August 2004, he made his debut coming off the bench early in the second half for Rastislav Michalík in a 3–1 win against Chmel Blšany and scored the team's second goal for 2–1. In the following months, however, he was unable to repeat his performance of his first period at Hannover 96 and underwent therapy. He finished his first seasons with five appearances and as many appearances in the UEFA Champions League, where Sparta was eliminated in the group stage.

On 19 November 2005, he celebrated his return, being substituted on for Martin Hašek in a 4–2 win on matchday 13 of the 2005–06 season. That season, he made nine starts in the league and two in the Champions League. In the 2006–07 season, his third and final one for Sparta Prague, he made 18 appearances scoring 1 goal, playing ten times in the league and five times in the UEFA Cup. His fight against his alcoholism and arguments with coaches in his three years in Prague cost him sympathies. Having publicly voiced his intentions to leave the club, he was not allowed to attend the training shortly before his departure. Overall, he was limited to a total of 51 matches and 3 goals.

=== Second spell in Germany ===
In July 2007, Šimák changed again to Germany and signed a two-year contract with Carl Zeiss Jena who at the time were competing in the 2. Bundesliga.

In summer 2008 he moved to VfB Stuttgart, making his competitive debut in a 1–0 loss against Saturn Ramenskoye in the third round of the Intertoto Cup.

On 19 January 2010, Šimák moved to Mainz 05. After one season with Mainz, he returned to Carl Zeiss Jena, but left in 2012 after the club were relegated from the 3. Liga

=== Later career ===
In summer 2012 he returned to his hometown signing a six-month contract with newly formed FC MAS Táborsko competing in the 2. Liga hoping to move abroad again in January. In August 2014, he left Táborsko by mutual consent following health and personal issues.

== Honours ==
- Czech First League: 2005, 2007
