= Sebastian Schoof =

German footballer

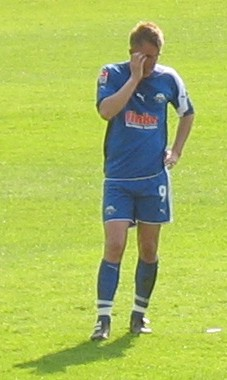
- Schoof with SC Paderborn in 2006

Personal information
- Date of birth: 22 March 1980 (age 46)
- Place of birth: Niederkassel, Germany
- Height: 1.90 m (6 ft 3 in)
- Position: Striker

Youth career
- FV Bad Honnef
- Bonner SC
- FC Hertha Rheidt
- Viktoria Köln

Senior career*
Years	Team	Apps	(Gls)
2001–2002	Bayer Leverkusen II	45	(15)
2003	Bayer Leverkusen	7	(2)
2004–2005	Rot-Weiss Essen	33	(10)
2005	Sportfreunde Siegen	7	(0)
2006	SC Paderborn	7	(1)
2006–2007	Kickers Emden	10	(0)
2007	Rot Weiss Ahlen	16	(2)
2008–2011	Germania Windeck	29	(8)
2011–2013	SF Troisdorf		
- * Club domestic league appearances and goals

Sebastian Schoof (born 22 March 1980) is a German former professional footballer who played as a striker. He spent two seasons in the Bundesliga with Bayer 04 Leverkusen.
