= Yıldıray Baştürk =

Turkish footballer (born 1978)

Personal information
- Full name: Yıldıray Baştürk
- Date of birth: 24 December 1978 (age 47)
- Place of birth: Herne, West Germany
- Height: 1.68 m (5 ft 6 in)
- Position: Attacking midfielder

Youth career
- 1986–1987: DSC Wanne-Eickel
- 1987–1996: Wattenscheid 09

Senior career*
Years	Team	Apps	(Gls)
1996–1997	Wattenscheid 09	20	(6)
1997–2001	VfL Bochum	104	(13)
2001–2004	Bayer Leverkusen	73	(8)
2004–2007	Hertha BSC	71	(14)
2007–2010	VfB Stuttgart	31	(4)
2010	Blackburn Rovers	1	(0)
Total		300	(45)

International career
1998–2008	Turkey	49	(3)
Medal record
Third place	FIFA World Cup	2002
- * Club domestic league appearances and goals

Yıldıray Baştürk (Turkish pronunciation: [jɯɫˈdɯˈɾaj baʃˈtyɾk], born 24 December 1978) is a retired professional footballer who played as an attacking midfielder.

Born in Germany, he was capped 49 times for the Turkey national football team, representing the team at the 2002 FIFA World Cup where they finished in third place. In the same year he also appeared for Bayer 04 Leverkusen in the 2002 UEFA Champions League Final. Baştürk also played for Wattenscheid 09, VfL Bochum, Hertha BSC, VfB Stuttgart and English club Blackburn Rovers.

== Club career ==
=== Early years, Bochum and Bayer ===
The son of a miner, Baştürk began his football career at Sportfreunde Wanne-Eickel. As a teenager Baştürk played for SG Wattenscheid 09, and his breakthrough in the Bundesliga came with city rivals VfL Bochum, for whom he even played in the UEFA Cup. After the 2001 transfer to Bayer 04 Leverkusen, Baştürk was part of a team that finished second in the league, the DFB-Pokal and the 2002 UEFA Champions League final in the 2001–02 season. Due to his role in Bayer's success and Turkey's third-place finish at the 2002 FIFA World Cup, Baştürk finished ninth in the voting for the 2002 Ballon d'Or.

=== Hertha and Stuttgart ===
In July 2004 he was transferred to Hertha BSC, where he remained until 2007 when his contract expired. Baştürk agreed to join German champions VfB Stuttgart on a Bosman transfer on 28 May 2007 for the start of the 2007–08 season.

=== Blackburn Rovers ===
On 27 January 2010, it was announced that Baştürk had agreed to join Blackburn Rovers from Stuttgart until the end of the season on a free transfer, after his contract with Stuttgart was terminated. Baştürk was handed his first start for Blackburn in the Premier League when he started against Wolverhampton Wanderers on 24 April 2010 at Molineux, however he was substituted at half-time. Baştürk was not offered a contract extension by Rovers. The following year he was a free agent and he finally announced his retirement in May 2011.

== International career ==
In 2002, Baştürk played in the 2002 FIFA World Cup, where the Turkish team came third. He amassed 49 caps and scored two goals for Turkey. However, after he was left out of Turkey's 23-man squad for Euro 2008, he said he would never play for the national team as long as Fatih Terim remains as the coach.

== Career statistics ==
=== International ===
Appearances and goals by national team and year
National team	Year	Apps	Goals
Turkey	1998	1	0
Turkey	1999	0	0
Turkey	2000	0	0
Turkey	2001	9	1
Turkey	2002	14	0
Turkey	2003	7	0
Turkey	2004	4	1
Turkey	2005	7	1
Turkey	2006	3	0
Turkey	2007	2	0
Turkey	2008	2	0
Total		49	3

=== International goals ===
Scores and results list Turkey's goal tally first, score column indicates score after each Baştürk goal.

List of international goals scored by Yıldıray Baştürk
No.	Date	Venue	Opponent	Score	Result	Competition
1	14 November 2001	Ali Sami Yen Stadium, Istanbul, Turkey	Austria	1–0	5–0	2002 World Cup qualifiers
2	28 April 2004	King Baudouin Stadium, Brussels, Belgium	Belgium	1–1	3–2	Friendly
3	26 March 2005	BJK İnönü Stadium, Istanbul, Turkey	Albania	2–0	2–0	2006 FIFA World Cup qualification

== Honours ==
Bayer Leverkusen

- UEFA Champions League: Runner-up 2001–02

Turkey

- FIFA World Cup: Third place 2002
- FIFA Confederations Cup: Third place 2003

Order

- Turkish State Medal of Distinguished Service
