= Michael Zepek =

German footballer

Personal information
- Date of birth: January 19, 1981 (age 45)
- Place of birth: Bad Friedrichshall, West Germany
- Position: Defender

Youth career
- SC Siegelsbach
- VfB Bad Rappenau
- –1995: SV Sinsheim
- 1995–1999: Karlsruher SC

Senior career*
| Years | Team | Apps | (Gls) |
| 1999–2000 | Karlsruher SC II | 28 | (2) |
| 1999–2001 | Karlsruher SC | 32 | (1) |
| 2001–2002 | Bayer Leverkusen II | 12 | (0) |
| 2001–2004 | Bayer Leverkusen | 0 | (0) |
| 2002–2003 | → LR Ahlen (loan) | 19 | (1) |
| 2003–2004 | → Karlsruher SC (loan) | 15 | (0) |
| 2004–2007 | TSG 1899 Hoffenheim | 61 | (3) |
| 2007–2008 | SV Elversberg 07 | 25 | (2) |
| 2009–2012 | Hessen Kassel | 34 | (1) |
| Total | | 226 | (10) |

International career
| 2001–2003 | Germany U-21 | 13 | (2) |
- * Club domestic league appearances and goals

Michael Zepek (born January 19, 1981) is a German former footballer.
