= Mile Božić =

Croatian footballer

Personal information
- Date of birth: 6 November 1981 (age 44)
- Place of birth: Leverkusen, West Germany
- Height: 1.81 m (5 ft 11 in)
- Position: Defender

Youth career
- 1988–2000: Bayer 04 Leverkusen

Senior career*
Years	Team	Apps	(Gls)
2000–2003	Bayer 04 Leverkusen II	60	(2)
2001–2003	Bayer 04 Leverkusen	0	(0)
2003–2004	VfL Osnabrück	4	(0)
2005	Fortuna Düsseldorf	6	(1)
2006	Union Solingen	1	(0)
2006–2007	1. FC Kleve	17	(1)
2007–2008	SpVgg Radevormwald		
2008–2009	KFC Uerdingen 05	12	(4)
2010–2012	FC Monheim		

International career
2002–2003	Croatia U-21	9	(0)
- * Club domestic league appearances and goals as of 16:51, 2 February 2009 (UTC)

Mile Božić (born 6 November 1981) is a retired footballer who last played for FC Monheim.

He made his debut on the professional league level in the 2. Bundesliga for VfL Osnabrück on 3 August 2003 when he started the opening day game against LR Ahlen. Born in Germany, he represented Croatia at under-21 international level.
