= Zoltán Sebescen =

German footballer

Zoltan Sebescen
Personal information
- Full name: Zoltan Sebescen
- Date of birth: 1 October 1975 (age 51)
- Place of birth: Ehingen, West Germany
- Height: 1.89 m (6 ft 2 in)
- Positions: Right-back; right winger

Youth career
- 1982–1994: Stuttgarter Kickers

Senior career*
Years	Team	Apps	(Gls)
1994–1999	Stuttgarter Kickers	72	(7)
1999–2001	VfL Wolfsburg	40	(10)
2001–2004	Bayer Leverkusen	32	(3)
Total		144	(20)

International career
1999–2000	Germany B	3	(1)
2000	Germany	1	(0)
- * Club domestic league appearances and goals

Zoltan Sebescen (Hungarian: Zoltán Sebestyén, Hungarian pronunciation: [ˈzoltaːn ˈʃɛbɛʃceːn]; born 1 October 1975) is a German former professional footballer who played as a right-back or right-winger.

== Club career ==
Sebescen was born in Ehingen. He started his career at Stuttgarter Kickers, where he played at a senior level from 1994, in the Regionalliga Süd, and from, in 1996 the 2. Bundesliga. In 1999, he transferred to Bundesliga side VfL Wolfsburg and then in 2001 to Bayer Leverkusen. With Bayer, Sebescen played in the 2002 UEFA Champions League Final, losing to Real Madrid. In 2003, he had to undergo several knee surgeries, due to problems caused by lyme disease. Having not been able to play for years, Sebescen announced his early retirement, aged 29, on 16 August 2005. He had played 72 times in the Bundesliga, scoring 13 times, and 52 times in the 2. Bundesliga, scoring 5 times.

== International career ==
Sebescen became the first VfL Wolfsburg player to earn a cap for the Germany national football team when he played in a friendly against the Netherlands in Amsterdam in February 2000. Being placed in an unaccustomed right-back position, he produced a dismal performance against Dutch winger Boudewijn Zenden and was substituted at half-time. He subsequently was not called up again.

== Coaching career ==
In July 2007, he started working as youth coordinator for his first club, Stuttgarter Kickers.

== Personal life ==
He is of Hungarian descent.

On 31 October 2019, 44-year-old Sebescen returned to the pitch, signing for German amateur club TV Unterboihingen. Since his retirement in 2005, Sebescen had only played old-boys football, among others for his former club Bayer Leverkusen. Sebescen had worked together with Unterboihingen's manager Daniel Zeller's brother, Philipp, at the sporting goods company Decathlon. Sebescen got his debut for Unterboihingen on 1 December 2019.
