= Copa Sudamericana clubs performance comparison =

The table below shows the comparison of the performances of all the 245 clubs that participated in Copa Sudamericana until the edition of 2025.

== Classification ==
C	Champions
F	Runners-up
SF	Semi-finals
QF	Quarter-finals
R16	Round of 16
PO	Knockout round play-offs
GS	Group stage
SS	Second stage
FS	First stage
•	Did not participate

Notes: Since 2017, clubs transferred from Copa Libertadores are marked in italics. Since 2021 a group stage was included in the tournament and the second stage was eliminated.

== Performance ==
Club (# of participations)		2002	2003	2004	2005	2006	2007	2008	2009	2010	2011	2012	2013	2014	2015	2016	2017	2018	2019	2020	2021	2022	2023	2024	2025	2026
(Brazil) BRAZIL (196)		(0)	(12)	(12)	(8)	(8)	(8)	(8)	(9)	(8)	(8)	(8)	(9)	(8)	(8)	(8)	(8)	(7)	(7)	(7)	(8)	(7)	(8)	(7)	(8)	(7)
1	São Paulo (15)	•	SF	SS	SS	•	QF	SS	•	•	R16	C	SF	SF	•	•	FS	SS	•	SS	•	F	QF	•	•	QF
2	Atlético Mineiro (11)	•	FS	FS	•	•	•	SS	FS	QF	SS	•	•	•	•	•	•	FS	SF	FS	•	•	•	•	F	F
3	Fluminense (11)	•	SS	•	QF	R16	•	•	F	•	•	•	•	SS	•	•	QF	SF	QF	FS	•	GS	•	•	QF	•
4	Santos (10)	•	QF	QF	SS	R16	•	•	•	SS	•	•	•	•	•	•	•	•	FS	•	QF	R16	GS	•	•	QF
5	Corinthians (10)	•	FS	•	QF	R16	SS	•	•	•	•	•	•	•	•	•	R16	•	SF	•	GS	•	SF	SF	GS	•
6	Botafogo (10)	•	•	•	•	SS	R16	QF	QF	•	R16	SS	•	•	•	•	•	R16	R16	•	•	•	QF	•	•	R16
7	Vasco da Gama (9)	•	FS	•	•	SS	QF	SS	•	•	SF	•	•	•	•	•	•	SS	•	R16	•	•	•	•	PO	SF
8	Goiás (9)	•	•	FS	SS	•	R16	•	R16	F	•	•	•	R16	SS	•	•	•	•	FS	•	•	R16	•	•	•
9	Athletico Paranaense (9)	•	•	•	•	SF	SS	R16	FS	•	SS	•	•	•	QF	•	•	C	•	•	C	•	•	QF	•	•
10	Bahia (9)	•	•	•	•	•	•	•	•	•	•	SS	R16	R16	SS	•	•	QF	FS	QF	GS	•	•	•	PO	•
11	Cruzeiro (8)	•	FS	SS	R16	SS	SS	•	•	•	•	•	•	•	•	•	FS	•	•	•	•	•	•	F	GS	•
12	Internacional (8)	•	FS	SF	QF	•	•	C	R16	•	•	•	•	SS	•	•	•	•	•	•	•	QF	•	PO	•	•
13	Grêmio (8)	•	FS	FS	•	•	•	SS	•	SS	•	QF	•	•	•	•	•	•	•	•	R16	•	•	•	PO	PO
14	Flamengo (6)	•	FS	FS	•	•	•	•	FS	•	R16	•	•	•	•	R16	F	•	•	•	•	•	•	•	•	•
15	Vitória (6)	•	•	•	•	•	•	•	R16	SS	•	•	SS	R16	•	SS	•	•	•	•	•	•	•	•	GS	•
16	Palmeiras (5)	•	FS	•	•	•	•	QF	•	SF	SS	R16	•	•	•	•	•	•	•	•	•	•	•	•	•	•
17	Coritiba (5)	•	•	FS	•	•	•	•	FS	•	•	SS	R16	•	•	QF	•	•	•	•	•	•	•	•	•	•
18	Sport Recife (5)	•	•	•	•	•	•	•	•	•	•	•	R16	SS	R16	SS	QF	•	•	•	•	•	•	•	•	•
19	Figueirense (4)	•	•	FS	•	•	SS	•	•	•	•	SS	•	•	•	SS	•	•	•	•	•	•	•	•	•	•
20	Chapecoense (4)	•	•	•	•	•	•	•	•	•	•	•	•	•	QF	C	R16	•	FS	•	•	•	•	•	•	•
21	Red Bull Bragantino (4)	•	•	•	•	•	•	•	•	•	•	•	•	•	•	•	•	•	•	•	F	•	R16	R16	•	R16
22	Ceará (3)	•	•	•	•	•	•	•	•	•	SS	•	•	•	•	•	•	•	•	•	GS	QF	•	•	•	•
23	Atlético Goianiense (3)	•	•	•	•	•	•	•	•	•	•	R16	•	•	•	•	•	•	•	•	GS	SF	•	•	•	•
24	Ponte Preta (3)	•	•	•	•	•	•	•	•	•	•	•	F	•	SS	•	R16	•	•	•	•	•	•	•	•	•
25	Cuiabá (3)	•	•	•	•	•	•	•	•	•	•	•	•	•	•	SS	•	•	•	•	•	GS	•	PO	•	•
26	Fortaleza (3)	•	•	•	•	•	•	•	•	•	•	•	•	•	•	•	•	•	•	FS	•	•	F	QF	•	•
27	São Caetano (2)	•	SS	FS	•	•	•	•	•	•	•	•	•	•	•	•	•	•	•	•	•	•	•	•	•	•
28	Paraná (2)	•	•	FS	•	SS	•	•	•	•	•	•	•	•	•	•	•	•	•	•	•	•	•	•	•	•
29	Criciúma (2)	•	•	•	•	•	•	•	•	•	•	•	SS	SS	•	•	•	•	•	•	•	•	•	•	•	•
30	Juventude (1)	•	•	•	SS	•	•	•	•	•	•	•	•	•	•	•	•	•	•	•	•	•	•	•	•	•
31	Avaí (1)	•	•	•	•	•	•	•	•	QF	•	•	•	•	•	•	•	•	•	•	•	•	•	•	•	•
32	Grêmio Barueri (1)	•	•	•	•	•	•	•	•	SS	•	•	•	•	•	•	•	•	•	•	•	•	•	•	•	•
33	Náutico (1)	•	•	•	•	•	•	•	•	•	•	•	SS	•	•	•	•	•	•	•	•	•	•	•	•	•
34	Portuguesa (1)	•	•	•	•	•	•	•	•	•	•	•	SS	•	•	•	•	•	•	•	•	•	•	•	•	•
35	Brasília (1)	•	•	•	•	•	•	•	•	•	•	•	•	•	R16	•	•	•	•	•	•	•	•	•	•	•
36	Joinville (1)	•	•	•	•	•	•	•	•	•	•	•	•	•	SS	•	•	•	•	•	•	•	•	•	•	•
37	Santa Cruz (1)	•	•	•	•	•	•	•	•	•	•	•	•	•	•	R16	•	•	•	•	•	•	•	•	•	•
38	América Mineiro (1)	•	•	•	•	•	•	•	•	•	•	•	•	•	•	•	•	•	•	•	•	•	QF	•	•	•
(Argentina) ARGENTINA (168)		(5)	(7)	(6)	(7)	(7)	(6)	(7)	(6)	(6)	(7)	(6)	(6)	(7)	(7)	(6)	(8)	(7)	(6)	(8)	(7)	(6)	(8)	(7)	(7)	(8)
3	Lanús (15)	•	•	•	•	QF	R16	•	R16	•	SS	•	C	R16	R16	SS	•	SS	•	F	GS	R16	•	SF	C	PO
2	San Lorenzo (13)	C	SS	SS	•	QF	SS	SS	QF	•	•	•	SS	•	•	SF	•	R16	•	•	GS	•	R16	•	•	GS
3	Independiente (13)	•	SS	•	•	•	•	SS	•	C	R16	QF	•	•	QF	R16	C	•	QF	QF	R16	GS	•	•	R16	•
4	Boca Juniors (12)	SS	QF	C	C	R16	R16	QF	FS	•	•	SS	•	SF	•	•	•	•	•	•	•	•	•	R16	•	C
5	River Plate (12)	SS	F	SS	R16	R16	SF	QF	FS	•	•	•	QF	C	SF	•	•	•	•	•	•	•	•	•	•	R16
6	Estudiantes (9)	•	•	•	SS	•	SS	F	•	SS	SS	•	•	QF	•	SS	R16	•	•	•	•	•	QF	•	•	•
7	Racing (8)	QF	•	•	•	•	•	•	•	•	•	SS	SS	•	•	•	QF	•	FS	•	•	GS	•	C	•	GS
8	Vélez Sarsfield (8)	•	FS	•	SF	SS	•	•	QF	SS	SF	•	QF	•	•	•	•	•	•	SF	•	•	•	•	•	•
9	Defensa y Justicia (8)	•	•	•	•	•	•	•	•	•	•	•	•	•	•	•	SS	QF	FS	C	•	GS	SF	GS	GS	•
10	Banfield (7)	•	•	FS	R16	SS	•	•	•	R16	•	•	•	•	•	SS	•	R16	•	•	•	GS	•	•	•	•
11	Arsenal (7)	•	•	QF	•	•	C	R16	•	•	QF	•	•	•	SS	•	SS	•	•	•	R16	•	•	•	•	•
12	Argentinos Juniors (7)	•	•	•	•	•	•	SF	•	SS	SS	SS	•	•	•	•	•	•	R16	FS	•	•	•	GS	•	•
13	Rosario Central (6)	•	FS	•	R16	•	•	•	•	•	•	•	•	SS	•	•	•	FS	•	•	QF	•	•	R16	•	•
14	Gimnasia y Esgrima (5)	QF	•	•	•	QF	•	•	•	•	•	•	•	SS	•	•	FS	•	•	•	•	•	GS	•	•	•
15	Newell's Old Boys (5)	•	•	•	SS	•	•	•	•	QF	•	•	•	•	•	•	•	FS	•	•	GS	•	R16	•	•	•
16	Tigre (5)	•	•	•	•	•	•	•	FS	•	•	F	•	•	SS	•	•	•	•	•	•	•	PO	•	•	R16
17	Huracán (5)	•	•	•	•	•	•	•	•	•	•	•	•	•	F	•	SS	•	•	FS	•	•	GS	•	R16	•
18	Colón (4)	•	SS	•	•	•	•	•	•	•	•	R16	•	•	•	•	•	R16	F	•	•	•	•	•	•	•
19	Belgrano (4)	•	•	•	•	•	•	•	•	•	•	•	SS	•	SS	R16	•	•	•	•	•	•	•	R16	•	•
20	Unión (4)	•	•	•	•	•	•	•	•	•	•	•	•	•	•	•	•	•	FS	R16	•	R16	•	•	GS	•
21	Godoy Cruz (3)	•	•	•	•	•	•	•	•	•	R16	•	•	SS	•	•	•	•	•	•	•	•	•	•	R16	•
22	Atlético Tucumán (2)	•	•	•	•	•	•	•	•	•	•	•	•	•	•	•	R16	•	•	SS	•	•	•	•	•	•
23	Quilmes (1)	•	•	FS	•	•	•	•	•	•	•	•	•	•	•	•	•	•	•	•	•	•	•	•	•	•
24	Talleres (1)	•	•	•	•	•	•	•	•	•	•	•	•	•	•	•	•	•	•	•	GS	•	•	•	•	•
25	Patronato (1)	•	•	•	•	•	•	•	•	•	•	•	•	•	•	•	•	•	•	•	•	•	PO	•	•	•
26	Central Córdoba (1)	•	•	•	•	•	•	•	•	•	•	•	•	•	•	•	•	•	•	•	•	•	•	•	R16	•
27	Barracas Central (1)	•	•	•	•	•	•	•	•	•	•	•	•	•	•	•	•	•	•	•	•	•	•	•	•	GS
28	Deportivo Riestra (1)	•	•	•	•	•	•	•	•	•	•	•	•	•	•	•	•	•	•	•	•	•	•	•	•	GS
(Colombia) COLOMBIA (101)		(2)	(2)	(2)	(2)	(2)	(2)	(2)	(2)	(3)	(3)	(4)	(4)	(4)	(4)	(5)	(7)	(7)	(6)	(6)	(6)	(5)	(6)	(4)	(5)	(6)
1	Deportivo Cali (11)	•	•	•	FS	•	•	SS	FS	•	SS	•	•	SS	•	•	SS	QF	SS	R16	FS	R16	•	•	•	•
2	Deportes Tolima (11)	•	•	•	•	R16	•	•	•	QF	•	SS	•	•	R16	FS	FS	•	SS	SS	GS	•	GS	FS	•	•
3	Atlético Nacional (10)	F	SF	•	R16	•	SS	•	•	•	•	•	QF	F	•	F	•	•	SS	SS	•	•	•	•	•	FS
4	Junior (10)	•	•	QF	•	•	•	•	•	•	•	•	•	•	SS	QF	SF	F	•	QF	R16	GS	FS	•	FS	•
5	Millonarios (9)	•	•	FS	•	•	SF	•	•	•	•	SF	•	FS	•	•	•	R16	•	SS	•	•	GS	•	FS	GS
6	América de Cali (8)	SS	•	•	•	•	•	R16	•	•	•	•	•	•	•	•	•	FS	•	•	R16	FS	•	FS	R16	GS
7	Independiente Medellín (8)	•	•	•	•	FS	•	•	•	•	•	•	•	•	•	QF	SS	FS	•	•	•	GS	PO	QF	•	PO
8	Santa Fe (8)	•	•	•	•	•	•	•	•	R16	QF	•	•	•	C	R16	R16	SF	•	•	•	•	GS	•	•	QF
9	La Equidad (7)	•	•	•	•	•	•	•	FS	•	SS	FS	R16	•	•	•	•	•	QF	•	GS	FS	•	•	•	•
10	Águilas Doradas (6)	•	•	•	•	•	•	•	•	•	•	•	QF	FS	SS	•	FS	•	SS	•	•	•	FS	•	•	•
11	Deportivo Pasto (4)	•	FS	•	•	•	•	•	•	•	•	•	R16	•	•	•	•	•	•	FS	FS	•	•	•	•	•
12	Once Caldas (2)	•	•	•	•	•	•	•	•	•	•	•	•	•	•	•	•	•	FS	•	•	•	•	•	QF	•
13	Atlético Bucaramanga (2)	•	•	•	•	•	•	•	•	•	•	•	•	•	•	•	•	•	•	•	•	•	•	•	PO	FS
14	Atlético Huila (1)	•	•	•	•	•	•	•	•	SS	•	•	•	•	•	•	•	•	•	•	•	•	•	•	•	•
15	Envigado (1)	•	•	•	•	•	•	•	•	•	•	SS	•	•	•	•	•	•	•	•	•	•	•	•	•	•
16	Patriotas (1)	•	•	•	•	•	•	•	•	•	•	•	•	•	•	•	SS	•	•	•	•	•	•	•	•	•
17	Jaguares (1)	•	•	•	•	•	•	•	•	•	•	•	•	•	•	•	•	FS	•	•	•	•	•	•	•	•
18	Alianza (1)	•	•	•	•	•	•	•	•	•	•	•	•	•	•	•	•	•	•	•	•	•	•	GS	•	•
Club (# of participations)		2002	2003	2004	2005	2006	2007	2008	2009	2010	2011	2012	2013	2014	2015	2016	2017	2018	2019	2020	2021	2022	2023	2024	2025	2026
(Chile) CHILE (98)		(2)	(2)	(2)	(2)	(2)	(2)	(2)	(2)	(3)	(3)	(5)	(4)	(4)	(4)	(4)	(5)	(4)	(6)	(5)	(4)	(7)	(7)	(6)	(6)	(5)
1	Universidad Católica (15)	•	SS	•	SF	•	•	R16	•	•	R16	SF	R16	FS	SS	FS	•	•	SS	QF	•	R16	FS	FS	FS	•
2	Universidad de Chile (9)	•	•	•	FS	•	•	•	QF	FS	C	QF	R16	•	•	•	FS	•	•	•	•	•	•	•	SF	FS
3	Palestino (8)	•	•	•	•	•	•	•	•	•	•	•	•	•	•	QF	SS	•	SS	•	GS	•	GS	R16	PO	GS
4	Colo-Colo (7)	•	•	•	•	F	R16	•	•	FS	•	•	SS	•	•	•	•	•	FS	•	•	R16	PO	•	•	•
5	Huachipato (6)	•	•	•	•	FS	•	•	•	•	•	•	•	R16	FS	•	•	•	•	SS	GS	•	•	R16	•	•
6	Audax Italiano (5)	•	•	•	•	•	SS	•	•	•	•	•	•	•	•	•	•	FS	•	SS	•	•	PO	•	•	GS
7	Unión Española (5)	•	•	•	•	•	•	•	R16	•	•	•	•	•	•	•	•	FS	SS	•	•	FS	•	•	GS	•
8	Deportes Iquique (5)	•	•	•	•	•	•	•	•	•	SS	FS	•	FS	•	•	SS	•	•	•	•	•	•	•	GS	•
9	Everton (5)	•	•	•	•	•	•	•	•	•	•	•	•	•	•	•	FS	FS	•	•	•	GS	•	FS	FS	•
10	O'Higgins (4)	•	•	•	•	•	•	•	•	•	•	FS	•	•	•	FS	FS	•	•	•	•	•	•	•	•	PO
11	Cobresal (4)	•	•	•	•	•	•	•	•	•	•	•	•	FS	•	•	•	•	•	•	FS	•	FS	•	•	FS
12	Unión La Calera (4)	•	•	•	•	•	•	•	•	•	•	•	•	•	•	•	•	•	SS	R16	•	GS	•	GS	•	•
13	Santiago Wanderers (3)	QF	•	FS	•	•	•	•	•	•	•	•	•	•	FS	•	•	•	•	•	•	•	•	•	•	•
14	Cobreloa (3)	SS	•	•	•	•	•	•	•	•	•	SS	SS	•	•	•	•	•	•	•	•	•	•	•	•	•
15	Universidad de Concepción (3)	•	•	SS	•	•	•	•	•	•	•	•	•	•	FS	FS	•	•	•	•	•	•	•	•	•	•
16	Ñublense (3)	•	•	•	•	•	•	SS	•	•	•	•	•	•	•	•	•	•	•	•	•	FS	R16	•	•	•
17	Deportes Antofagasta (3)	•	•	•	•	•	•	•	•	•	•	•	•	•	•	•	•	•	FS	•	FS	GS	•	•	•	•
18	Coquimbo Unido (2)	•	•	•	•	•	•	•	•	•	•	•	•	•	•	•	•	•	•	SF	•	•	•	GS	•	•
19	Provincial Osorno (1)	•	FS	•	•	•	•	•	•	•	•	•	•	•	•	•	•	•	•	•	•	•	•	•	•	•
20	Unión San Felipe (1)	•	•	•	•	•	•	•	•	R16	•	•	•	•	•	•	•	•	•	•	•	•	•	•	•	•
21	Deportes Temuco (1)	•	•	•	•	•	•	•	•	•	•	•	•	•	•	•	•	SS	•	•	•	•	•	•	•	•
22	Magallanes (1)	•	•	•	•	•	•	•	•	•	•	•	•	•	•	•	•	•	•	•	•	•	GS	•	•	•
(Ecuador) ECUADOR (93)		(2)	(2)	(2)	(2)	(2)	(2)	(2)	(2)	(4)	(3)	(4)	(4)	(4)	(4)	(4)	(4)	(4)	(4)	(4)	(6)	(7)	(5)	(7)	(5)	(4)
1	LDU Quito (15)	•	SS	SF	SS	FS	•	R16	C	SF	F	•	•	•	R16	•	R16	R16	•	•	QF	GS	C	R16	•	•
2	Barcelona (11)	SS	FS	•	•	•	•	•	•	SS	•	R16	FS	SS	•	FS	•	FS	•	•	•	GS	PO	PO	•	•
3	Emelec (11)	•	•	•	•	•	•	•	R16	R16	SS	R16	SS	QF	R16	SS	•	•	•	SS	GS	•	R16	•	•	•
4	Universidad Católica (9)	•	•	•	•	•	•	•	•	•	•	•	•	SS	FS	FS	SS	•	R16	FS	•	GS	•	PO	R16	•
5	Independiente del Valle (7)	•	•	•	•	•	•	•	•	•	•	•	SS	SS	•	•	•	•	C	•	R16	C	•	PO	SF	•
6	Aucas (6)	FS	•	FS	•	•	•	•	•	•	•	•	•	•	•	FS	•	•	•	FS	GS	•	•	•	FS	•
7	El Nacional (5)	•	•	•	FS	R16	R16	•	•	•	•	•	•	•	•	•	•	SS	•	FS	•	•	•	•	•	•
8	Deportivo Cuenca (5)	•	•	•	•	•	•	•	•	•	•	•	•	•	•	•	FS	R16	•	•	•	•	FS	FS	•	GS
9	Deportivo Quito (4)	•	•	•	•	•	•	SS	•	FS	FS	R16	•	•	•	•	•	•	•	•	•	•	•	•	•	•
10	LDU Loja (3)	•	•	•	•	•	•	•	•	•	•	R16	R16	•	FS	•	•	•	•	•	•	•	•	•	•	•
11	Macará (3)	•	•	•	•	•	•	•	•	•	•	•	•	•	•	•	•	•	SS	•	FS	•	•	•	•	R16
12	Mushuc Runa (3)	•	•	•	•	•	•	•	•	•	•	•	•	•	•	•	•	•	FS	•	•	FS	•	•	R16	•
13	Delfín (3)	•	•	•	•	•	•	•	•	•	•	•	•	•	•	•	•	•	•	•	•	FS	FS	GS	•	•
14	Orense (2)	•	•	•	•	•	•	•	•	•	•	•	•	•	•	•	•	•	•	•	•	•	•	•	FS	FS
15	Olmedo (1)	•	•	•	•	•	SS	•	•	•	•	•	•	•	•	•	•	•	•	•	•	•	•	•	•	•
16	Fuerza Amarilla (1)	•	•	•	•	•	•	•	•	•	•	•	•	•	•	•	SS	•	•	•	•	•	•	•	•	•
17	Guayaquil City (1)	•	•	•	•	•	•	•	•	•	•	•	•	•	•	•	•	•	•	•	FS	•	•	•	•	•
18	9 de Octubre (1)	•	•	•	•	•	•	•	•	•	•	•	•	•	•	•	•	•	•	•	•	GS	•	•	•	•
19	Técnico Universitario (1)	•	•	•	•	•	•	•	•	•	•	•	•	•	•	•	•	•	•	•	•	•	•	FS	•	•
20	Libertad (1)	•	•	•	•	•	•	•	•	•	•	•	•	•	•	•	•	•	•	•	•	•	•	•	•	FS
(Uruguay) URUGUAY (92)		(2)	(2)	(2)	(2)	(2)	(2)	(2)	(2)	(3)	(3)	(4)	(4)	(4)	(4)	(4)	(4)	(7)	(5)	(5)	(5)	(5)	(4)	(4)	(5)	(6)
1	Danubio (13)	SS	FS	FS	FS	•	FS	•	•	•	•	FS	•	FS	FS	•	FS	FS	•	•	•	•	GS	GS	FS	•
2	Nacional (10)	SF	SS	•	•	QF	•	•	•	•	SS	SS	•	•	SS	•	•	QF	•	•	R16	QF	•	•	•	PO
3	Peñarol (10)	•	•	SS	•	•	•	•	•	R16	•	•	FS	R16	•	FS	•	SS	R16	SS	SF	•	GS	•	•	•
4	Defensor Sporting (9)	•	•	•	SS	•	QF	R16	•	R16	•	•	•	•	QF	•	FS	SS	•	•	•	•	FS	•	•	FS
5	River Plate (9)	•	•	•	•	•	•	FS	SF	FS	•	•	SS	SS	•	•	•	•	SS	R16	•	GS	FS	•	•	•
6	Liverpool (6)	•	•	•	•	•	•	•	FS	•	•	R16	•	•	•	•	FS	•	SS	SS	•	FS	•	•	•	•
7	Montevideo Wanderers (6)	•	•	•	•	•	•	•	•	•	•	•	FS	•	•	R16	•	•	R16	•	•	GS	•	FS	FS	•
8	Cerro Largo (5)	•	•	•	•	•	•	•	•	•	•	FS	•	•	•	•	•	•	•	•	FS	FS	•	FS	PO	•
9	Fénix (4)	•	•	•	•	•	•	•	•	•	FS	•	•	•	•	FS	•	•	•	R16	FS	•	•	•	•	•
10	Boston River (4)	•	•	•	•	•	•	•	•	•	•	•	•	•	•	•	SS	SS	•	•	•	•	•	•	GS	GS
11	Racing (3)	•	•	•	•	•	•	•	•	•	•	•	•	•	•	•	•	•	•	•	•	•	•	PO	GS	FS
12	Juventud (2)	•	•	•	•	•	•	•	•	•	•	•	•	•	SS	•	•	•	•	•	•	•	•	•	•	GS
13	Plaza Colonia (2)	•	•	•	•	•	•	•	•	•	•	•	•	•	•	FS	•	•	•	SS	•	•	•	•	•	•
14	Cerro (2)	•	•	•	•	•	•	•	•	•	•	•	•	•	•	•	•	SS	SS	•	•	•	•	•	•	•
15	Montevideo City Torque (1)	•	•	•	•	•	•	•	•	•	•	•	•	•	•	•	•	•	•	•	GS	•	•	•	•	SF
16	Central Español (1)	•	•	•	•	FS	•	•	•	•	•	•	•	•	•	•	•	•	•	•	•	•	•	•	•	•
17	Bella Vista (1)	•	•	•	•	•	•	•	•	•	FS	•	•	•	•	•	•	•	•	•	•	•	•	•	•	•
18	El Tanque Sisley (1)	•	•	•	•	•	•	•	•	•	•	•	FS	•	•	•	•	•	•	•	•	•	•	•	•	•
19	Rentistas (1)	•	•	•	•	•	•	•	•	•	•	•	•	FS	•	•	•	•	•	•	•	•	•	•	•	•
20	Rampla Juniors (1)	•	•	•	•	•	•	•	•	•	•	•	•	•	•	•	•	SS	•	•	•	•	•	•	•	•
Club (# of participations)		2002	2003	2004	2005	2006	2007	2008	2009	2010	2011	2012	2013	2014	2015	2016	2017	2018	2019	2020	2021	2022	2023	2024	2025	2026
(Bolivia) BOLIVIA (91)		(2)	(2)	(2)	(2)	(2)	(2)	(2)	(2)	(3)	(3)	(4)	(4)	(4)	(4)	(4)	(4)	(6)	(4)	(5)	(5)	(5)	(4)	(5)	(6)	(5)
1	Bolívar (14)	SF	FS	F	FS	FS	•	SS	•	•	•	•	•	•	FS	SS	SS	SS	•	R16	GS	•	•	•	QF	R16
2	Oriente Petrolero (10)	FS	•	•	•	•	•	•	•	SS	•	FS	FS	•	FS	•	SS	•	FS	FS	•	GS	GS	•	•	•
3	Blooming (9)	•	•	•	•	•	•	FS	FS	•	•	FS	FS	•	•	SS	•	FS	•	FS	•	•	GS	•	•	GS
4	Nacional Potosí (8)	•	•	•	•	•	•	•	•	•	•	•	•	FS	•	•	SS	FS	FS	FS	FS	•	•	GS	GS	•
5	Jorge Wilstermann (7)	•	•	•	•	•	FS	•	•	•	•	•	•	FS	•	FS	•	SS	•	•	GS	GS	•	FS	•	•
6	Guabirá (6)	•	•	•	•	•	•	•	•	•	•	•	•	•	•	•	•	FS	FS	•	GS	FS	FS	•	•	FS
7	The Strongest (5)	•	QF	•	R16	•	•	•	•	•	FS	•	FS	•	•	•	•	•	•	•	•	R16	•	•	•	•
8	Aurora (5)	•	•	FS	•	•	•	•	•	•	R16	SS	•	•	FS	•	•	•	•	•	•	•	•	•	FS	•
9	Universitario de Sucre (4)	•	•	•	•	SS	•	•	•	R16	•	FS	•	SS	•	•	•	•	•	•	•	•	•	•	•	•
10	Real Potosí (4)	•	•	•	•	•	FS	•	•	•	•	•	FS	•	FS	SS	•	•	•	•	•	•	•	•	•	•
11	San José (4)	•	•	•	•	•	•	•	•	R16	FS	•	•	FS	•	•	•	FS	•	•	•	•	•	•	•	•
12	Royal Pari (2)	•	•	•	•	•	•	•	•	•	•	•	•	•	•	•	•	•	R16	•	•	FS	•	•	•	•
13	Always Ready (2)	•	•	•	•	•	•	•	•	•	•	•	•	•	•	•	•	•	•	FS	•	•	•	PO	•	•
14	Atlético Palmaflor (2)	•	•	•	•	•	•	•	•	•	•	•	•	•	•	•	•	•	•	•	FS	•	FS	•	•	•
15	Universitario de Vinto (2)	•	•	•	•	•	•	•	•	•	•	•	•	•	•	•	•	•	•	•	•	•	•	FS	FS	•
16	San Antonio Bulo Bulo (2)	•	•	•	•	•	•	•	•	•	•	•	•	•	•	•	•	•	•	•	•	•	•	•	PO	FS
17	La Paz (1)	•	•	•	•	•	•	•	FS	•	•	•	•	•	•	•	•	•	•	•	•	•	•	•	•	•
18	Petrolero (1)	•	•	•	•	•	•	•	•	•	•	•	•	•	•	•	FS	•	•	•	•	•	•	•	•	•
19	Real Tomayapo (1)	•	•	•	•	•	•	•	•	•	•	•	•	•	•	•	•	•	•	•	•	•	•	GS	•	•
20	GV San José (1)	•	•	•	•	•	•	•	•	•	•	•	•	•	•	•	•	•	•	•	•	•	•	•	GS	•
21	Independiente Petrolero (1)	•	•	•	•	•	•	•	•	•	•	•	•	•	•	•	•	•	•	•	•	•	•	•	•	GS
(Paraguay) PARAGUAY (91)		(2)	(2)	(2)	(2)	(2)	(2)	(2)	(2)	(3)	(3)	(4)	(4)	(4)	(4)	(4)	(6)	(4)	(4)	(4)	(5)	(5)	(5)	(8)	(4)	(4)
1	Libertad (16)	SS	QF	FS	•	SS	FS	SS	FS	•	QF	•	SF	R16	R16	FS	SF	•	•	•	SF	•	R16	QF	•	•
2	Cerro Porteño (12)	FS	•	QF	R16	FS	•	•	SF	SS	•	QF	FS	QF	•	SF	R16	•	•	•	•	•	•	PO	•	•
3	Nacional (10)	•	•	•	•	•	•	•	•	•	SS	•	SS	•	SS	•	QF	SS	•	FS	FS	FS	•	GS	•	FS
4	Guaraní (9)	•	FS	•	FS	•	•	•	•	SS	•	SS	SS	•	•	•	•	•	FS	•	•	•	R16	FS	PO	•
5	Olimpia (9)	•	•	•	•	•	•	SS	•	FS	R16	SS	•	•	R16	•	SS	•	•	•	•	R16	•	FS	•	R16
6	Sportivo Luqueño (7)	•	•	•	•	•	•	•	•	•	•	•	•	•	SF	SS	FS	FS	•	SS	•	•	•	GS	GS	•
7	Sol de América (6)	•	•	•	•	•	•	•	•	•	•	•	•	•	•	R16	SS	SS	SS	SS	•	FS	•	•	•	•
8	Tacuary (3)	•	•	•	•	•	SS	•	•	•	•	FS	•	•	•	•	•	•	•	•	•	•	GS	•	•	•
9	Sportivo Ameliano (3)	•	•	•	•	•	•	•	•	•	•	•	•	•	•	•	•	•	•	•	•	•	FS	R16	FS	•
10	General Díaz (2)	•	•	•	•	•	•	•	•	•	•	•	•	SS	•	•	•	SS	•	•	•	•	•	•	•	•
11	River Plate (2)	•	•	•	•	•	•	•	•	•	•	•	•	•	•	•	•	•	•	FS	GS	•	•	•	•	•
12	Guaireña (2)	•	•	•	•	•	•	•	•	•	•	•	•	•	•	•	•	•	•	•	FS	GS	•	•	•	•
13	General Caballero (2)	•	•	•	•	•	•	•	•	•	•	•	•	•	•	•	•	•	•	•	•	GS	FS	•	•	•
14	Sportivo Trinidense (2)	•	•	•	•	•	•	•	•	•	•	•	•	•	•	•	•	•	•	•	•	•	•	GS	•	FS
15	Deportivo Capiatá (1)	•	•	•	•	•	•	•	•	•	•	•	•	R16	•	•	•	•	•	•	•	•	•	•	•	•
16	Deportivo Santaní (1)	•	•	•	•	•	•	•	•	•	•	•	•	•	•	•	•	•	SS	•	•	•	•	•	•	•
17	Independiente (1)	•	•	•	•	•	•	•	•	•	•	•	•	•	•	•	•	•	FS	•	•	•	•	•	•	•
18	12 de Octubre (1)	•	•	•	•	•	•	•	•	•	•	•	•	•	•	•	•	•	•	•	GS	•	•	•	•	•
19	2 de Mayo (1)	•	•	•	•	•	•	•	•	•	•	•	•	•	•	•	•	•	•	•	•	•	•	•	FS	•
20	Recoleta (1)	•	•	•	•	•	•	•	•	•	•	•	•	•	•	•	•	•	•	•	•	•	•	•	•	R16
(Peru) PERU (90)		(2)	(2)	(3)	(2)	(2)	(2)	(2)	(2)	(3)	(3)	(4)	(4)	(4)	(4)	(4)	(4)	(4)	(6)	(4)	(5)	(4)	(5)	(4)	(6)	(5)
1	Sport Huancayo (9)	•	•	•	•	•	•	•	•	SS	•	•	FS	•	•	SS	FS	SS	FS	R16	GS	•	•	FS	•	•
2	Universitario (8)	FS	•	•	FS	•	FS	FS	•	•	QF	•	•	•	SS	FS	•	•	•	•	•	•	PO	•	•	•
3	Melgar (8)	•	•	•	•	•	•	•	•	•	•	•	FS	•	FS	•	•	•	SS	SS	GS	SF	•	•	GS	FS
4	Cienciano (7)	•	C	SS	•	•	•	•	R16	•	•	•	•	•	•	•	•	•	•	•	•	FS	FS	•	R16	QF
5	Alianza Lima (5)	QF	FS	•	•	•	•	•	•	•	•	•	•	FS	•	•	FS	•	•	•	•	•	•	•	QF	•
6	Universidad César Vallejo (5)	•	•	•	•	•	•	•	•	FS	FS	•	•	QF	•	•	•	•	•	•	•	•	GS	GS	•	•
7	Sporting Cristal (5)	•	•	•	•	•	•	•	•	•	•	•	•	•	•	•	•	FS	R16	•	QF	•	PO	•	•	PO
8	Alianza Atlético (4)	•	•	SS	SS	•	•	•	R16	•	•	•	•	•	•	•	•	•	•	•	•	•	•	•	•	GS
9	Ayacucho (4)	•	•	•	•	•	•	•	•	•	•	FS	FS	FS	•	•	•	•	•	•	•	GS	•	•	•	•
10	UTC (4)	•	•	•	•	•	•	•	•	•	•	•	•	FS	•	•	•	FS	FS	•	FS	•	•	•	•	•
11	Coronel Bolognesi (3)	•	•	FS	•	SS	FS	•	•	•	•	•	•	•	•	•	•	•	•	•	•	•	•	•	•	•
12	Universidad San Martín (3)	•	•	•	•	FS	•	•	•	SS	•	FS	•	•	•	•	•	•	•	•	•	•	•	•	•	•
13	Juan Aurich (3)	•	•	•	•	•	•	•	•	•	FS	•	FS	•	•	•	FS	•	•	•	•	•	•	•	•	•
14	Cusco (3)	•	•	•	•	•	•	•	•	•	•	•	•	•	•	SS	•	•	•	FS	•	•	•	•	FS	•
15	León de Huánuco (2)	•	•	•	•	•	•	•	•	•	•	FS	•	•	FS	•	•	•	•	•	•	•	•	•	•	•
16	Unión Comercio (2)	•	•	•	•	•	•	•	•	•	•	FS	•	•	FS	•	•	•	•	•	•	•	•	•	•	•
17	Deportivo Municipal (2)	•	•	•	•	•	•	•	•	•	•	•	•	•	•	FS	•	•	FS	•	•	•	•	•	•	•
18	Binacional (2)	•	•	•	•	•	•	•	•	•	•	•	•	•	•	•	•	•	FS	•	•	•	FS	•	•	•
19	Atlético Grau (2)	•	•	•	•	•	•	•	•	•	•	•	•	•	•	•	•	•	•	FS	•	•	•	•	GS	•
20	ADT (2)	•	•	•	•	•	•	•	•	•	•	•	•	•	•	•	•	•	•	•	•	•	•	FS	FS	•
21	Deportivo Garcilaso (2)	•	•	•	•	•	•	•	•	•	•	•	•	•	•	•	•	•	•	•	•	•	•	GS	•	FS
22	Sport Áncash (1)	•	•	•	•	•	•	R16	•	•	•	•	•	•	•	•	•	•	•	•	•	•	•	•	•	•
23	Comerciantes Unidos (1)	•	•	•	•	•	•	•	•	•	•	•	•	•	•	•	FS	•	•	•	•	•	•	•	•	•
24	Sport Rosario (1)	•	•	•	•	•	•	•	•	•	•	•	•	•	•	•	•	FS	•	•	•	•	•	•	•	•
25	Carlos A. Mannucci (1)	•	•	•	•	•	•	•	•	•	•	•	•	•	•	•	•	•	•	•	FS	•	•	•	•	•
26	Sport Boys (1)	•	•	•	•	•	•	•	•	•	•	•	•	•	•	•	•	•	•	•	•	FS	•	•	•	•
Club (# of participations)		2002	2003	2004	2005	2006	2007	2008	2009	2010	2011	2012	2013	2014	2015	2016	2017	2018	2019	2020	2021	2022	2023	2024	2025	2026
(Venezuela) VENEZUELA (89)		(2)	(2)	(2)	(2)	(2)	(2)	(2)	(2)	(3)	(3)	(4)	(4)	(4)	(4)	(4)	(4)	(4)	(6)	(6)	(5)	(5)	(4)	(4)	(4)	(5)
1	Caracas (9)	•	•	•	•	•	•	•	•	SS	•	•	•	SS	•	•	FS	R16	R16	SS	•	•	FS	•	GS	PO
2	Mineros de Guayana (8)	•	•	•	FS	SS	•	•	•	•	•	SS	SS	•	•	•	•	FS	FS	FS	FS	•	•	•	•	•
3	Deportivo Anzoátegui (7)	•	•	•	•	•	•	•	FS	•	SS	•	FS	FS	FS	FS	FS	•	•	•	•	•	•	•	•	•
4	Carabobo (6)	•	•	FS	•	FS	FS	•	•	•	•	•	•	•	FS	•	•	•	•	•	•	•	•	FS	•	GS
5	Zamora (6)	•	•	•	•	•	FS	•	FS	•	•	•	•	•	FS	SS	•	FS	•	FS	•	•	•	•	•	•
6	Deportivo La Guaira (6)	•	•	•	•	•	•	•	•	•	•	•	•	FS	SS	R16	•	•	•	•	•	GS	•	FS	FS	•
7	Monagas (5)	SS	FS	•	•	•	•	•	•	•	•	FS	•	•	•	•	•	•	FS	•	•	•	•	•	•	FS
8	Deportivo Táchira (5)	FS	•	•	•	•	•	•	•	•	•	FS	•	•	•	•	•	•	•	•	R16	QF	FS	•	•	•
9	Trujillanos (5)	•	•	•	SS	•	•	•	•	FS	SS	•	FS	FS	•	•	•	•	•	•	•	•	•	•	•	•
10	Deportivo Lara (5)	•	•	•	•	•	•	•	•	FS	•	FS	FS	•	•	FS	•	•	SS	•	•	•	•	•	•	•
11	Estudiantes de Mérida (5)	•	•	•	•	•	•	•	•	•	•	•	•	•	•	•	•	FS	FS	SS	•	FS	GS	•	•	•
12	Metropolitanos (5)	•	•	•	•	•	•	•	•	•	•	•	•	•	•	•	•	•	•	•	GS	GS	•	GS	FS	FS
13	Academia Puerto Cabello (4)	•	•	•	•	•	•	•	•	•	•	•	•	•	•	•	•	•	•	•	FS	•	GS	•	GS	GS
14	Aragua (3)	•	•	•	•	•	•	SS	•	•	•	•	•	•	•	•	•	•	•	FS	GS	•	•	•	•	•
15	Deportivo Petare (2)	•	FS	FS	•	•	•	•	•	•	•	•	•	•	•	•	•	•	•	•	•	•	•	•	•	•
16	Maracaibo (1)	•	•	•	•	•	•	FS	•	•	•	•	•	•	•	•	•	•	•	•	•	•	•	•	•	•
17	Yaracuyanos (1)	•	•	•	•	•	•	•	•	•	FS	•	•	•	•	•	•	•	•	•	•	•	•	•	•	•
18	Estudiantes de Caracas (1)	•	•	•	•	•	•	•	•	•	•	•	•	•	•	•	FS	•	•	•	•	•	•	•	•	•
19	Atlético Venezuela (1)	•	•	•	•	•	•	•	•	•	•	•	•	•	•	•	FS	•	•	•	•	•	•	•	•	•
20	Zulia (1)	•	•	•	•	•	•	•	•	•	•	•	•	•	•	•	•	•	QF	•	•	•	•	•	•	•
21	Llaneros (1)	•	•	•	•	•	•	•	•	•	•	•	•	•	•	•	•	•	•	FS	•	•	•	•	•	•
22	Hermanos Colmenarez (1)	•	•	•	•	•	•	•	•	•	•	•	•	•	•	•	•	•	•	•	•	FS	•	•	•	•
23	Rayo Zuliano (1)	•	•	•	•	•	•	•	•	•	•	•	•	•	•	•	•	•	•	•	•	•	•	GS	•	•
24	Universidad Central (1)	•	•	•	•	•	•	•	•	•	•	•	•	•	•	•	•	•	•	•	•	•	•	•	•	PO
(Mexico) MEXICO (9)		(0)	(0)	(0)	(2)	(2)	(3)	(2)	(0)	(0)	(0)	(0)	(0)	(0)	(0)	(0)	(0)	(0)	(0)	(0)	(0)	(0)	(0)	(0)	(0)	(0)
1	América (2)	•	•	•	QF	•	F	•	•	•	•	•	•	•	•	•	•	•	•	•	•	•	•	•	•	•
2	Pachuca (2)	•	•	•	•	C	R16	•	•	•	•	•	•	•	•	•	•	•	•	•	•	•	•	•	•	•
3	Guadalajara (2)	•	•	•	•	•	QF	SF	•	•	•	•	•	•	•	•	•	•	•	•	•	•	•	•	•	•
4	UNAM (1)	•	•	•	F	•	•	•	•	•	•	•	•	•	•	•	•	•	•	•	•	•	•	•	•	•
5	Toluca (1)	•	•	•	•	SF	•	•	•	•	•	•	•	•	•	•	•	•	•	•	•	•	•	•	•	•
6	San Luis (1)	•	•	•	•	•	•	R16	•	•	•	•	•	•	•	•	•	•	•	•	•	•	•	•	•	•
(United States) UNITED STATES (2)		(0)	(0)	(0)	(1)	(0)	(1)	(0)	(0)	(0)	(0)	(0)	(0)	(0)	(0)	(0)	(0)	(0)	(0)	(0)	(0)	(0)	(0)	(0)	(0)	(0)
1	D.C. United (2)	•	•	•	R16	•	R16	•	•	•	•	•	•	•	•	•	•	•	•	•	•	•	•	•	•	•
(Costa Rica) COSTA RICA (1)		(0)	(0)	(0)	(0)	(1)	(0)	(0)	(0)	(0)	(0)	(0)	(0)	(0)	(0)	(0)	(0)	(0)	(0)	(0)	(0)	(0)	(0)	(0)	(0)	(0)
1	Alajuelense (1)	•	•	•	•	R16	•	•	•	•	•	•	•	•	•	•	•	•	•	•	•	•	•	•	•	•
(Honduras) HONDURAS (1)		(0)	(0)	(0)	(0)	(0)	(0)	(1)	(0)	(0)	(0)	(0)	(0)	(0)	(0)	(0)	(0)	(0)	(0)	(0)	(0)	(0)	(0)	(0)	(0)	(0)
1	Motagua (1)	•	•	•	•	•	•	SS	•	•	•	•	•	•	•	•	•	•	•	•	•	•	•	•	•	•
Club (# of participations)		2002	2003	2004	2005	2006	2007	2008	2009	2010	2011	2012	2013	2014	2015	2016	2017	2018	2019	2020	2021	2022	2023	2024	2025	2026

== See also ==
- Copa Sudamericana
- Copa Sudamericana records and statistics
- List of Copa Sudamericana finals
