= List of Copa Sudamericana finals =

The Copa Sudamericana is an annual association football tournament established in 2002. The competition is organized by the South American Football Confederation, or CONMEBOL, and it is contested by 56 clubs from its member association. From 2004 to 2008, clubs from the CONCACAF were invited to participate. Until 2018, the final was contested over two legs, one at each participating club's stadium. From 2019, the format was changed, with the final being a single game played at a predetermined venue. San Lorenzo won the inaugural competition in 2002, defeating Atlético Nacional.

Eighteen different clubs have won the competition since its inception. Boca Juniors, Independiente, Lanús, Athletico Paranaense, Independiente del Valle, and LDU Quito share the record for the most victories, winning the competition two times each. Boca Juniors is also the only club to have successfully defended their title. Teams from Argentina have won the competition the most, with eleven titles among them.

The current champion is Lanús, who defeated Atlético Mineiro in the 2025 final.

== List of finals ==
Key
| ‡ | Finals won on away goals |
| * | Match decided by a penalty shoot-out |
| † | Match went to extra time |

- The "LIB" note by a team means that the team initially competed in the Copa Libertadores for that season (since the 2017 season).

List of Copa Sudamericana finals
| Year | Country | Winners | Score | Runners-up | Country | Venue | Attendance | Refs |
|---|---|---|---|---|---|---|---|---|
| 2002 | Argentina | San Lorenzo | 4–0 | Atlético Nacional | Colombia | (Colombia) Estadio Atanasio Girardot, Medellín | — | |
| 2002 | Argentina | San Lorenzo | 0–0 | Atlético Nacional | Colombia | (Argentina) Estadio Pedro Bidegain, Buenos Aires | 40,779 | |
| 2003 | Peru | Cienciano | 3–3 | River Plate | Argentina | (Argentina) Estadio Antonio V. Liberti, Buenos Aires | — | |
| 2003 | Peru | Cienciano | 1–0 | River Plate | Argentina | (Peru) Estadio de la UNSA, Arequipa | — | |
| 2004 | Argentina | Boca Juniors | 0–1 | Bolívar | Bolivia | (Bolivia) Estadio Hernando Siles, La Paz | — | |
| 2004 | Argentina | Boca Juniors | 2–0 | Bolívar | Bolivia | (Argentina) La Bombonera, Buenos Aires | — | |
| 2005 | Argentina | Boca Juniors | 1–1 | Pumas UNAM | Mexico | Estadio Olímpico Universitario, Mexico City | — | |
| 2005 | Argentina | Boca Juniors | 1–1* (Note: Score was 2–2 on aggregate after 90 minutes. Boca Juniors won the penalty shoot-out 4–3.) | Pumas UNAM | Mexico | (Argentina) La Bombonera, Buenos Aires | — | |
| 2006 | Mexico | Pachuca | 1–1 | Colo-Colo | Chile | (Mexico) Estadio Hidalgo, Pachuca | — | |
| 2006 | Mexico | Pachuca | 2–1 | Colo-Colo | Chile | (Chile) Estadio Nacional, Santiago | 55,000 | |
| 2007 | Argentina | Arsenal | 3–2 | América | Mexico | Estadio Azteca, Mexico City | — | |
| 2007 | Argentina | Arsenal | 1–2^{‡} | América | Mexico | (Argentina) El Cilindro, Avellaneda | — | |
| 2008 | Brazil | Internacional | 1–0 | Estudiantes | Argentina | (Argentina) Estadio Ciudad de La Plata, La Plata | — | |
| 2008 | Brazil | Internacional | 1–1^{†} | Estudiantes | Argentina | (Brazil) Estádio Beira-Rio, Porto Alegre | 51,803 | |
| 2009 | Ecuador | LDU Quito | 5–1 | Fluminense | Brazil | (Ecuador) Estadio Casa Blanca, Quito | 55,000 | |
| 2009 | Ecuador | LDU Quito | 0–3 | Fluminense | Brazil | (Brazil) Maracanã, Rio de Janeiro | 65,822 | |
| 2010 | Argentina | Independiente | 0–2 | Goiás | Brazil | (Brazil) Estádio Serra Dourada, Goiânia | — | |
| 2010 | Argentina | Independiente | 3–1* (Note: Score was 3–3 on aggregate after 90 minutes and extra time. Independiente won the penalty shoot-out 5–3.) | Goiás | Brazil | (Argentina) Estadio Libertadores de América, Avellaneda | — | |
| 2011 | Chile | Universidad de Chile | 1–0 | LDU Quito | Ecuador | (Ecuador) Estadio Casa Blanca, Quito | 41,000 | |
| 2011 | Chile | Universidad de Chile | 3–0 | LDU Quito | Ecuador | (Chile) Estadio Nacional, Santiago | 50,000 | |
| 2012 | Brazil | São Paulo | 0–0 | Tigre | Argentina | (Argentina) Estadio Alberto J. Armando, Buenos Aires | 29,000 | |
| 2012 | Brazil | São Paulo | 2–0 | Tigre | Argentina | (Brazil) Estádio do Morumbi, São Paulo | 67,042 | |
| 2013 | Argentina | Lanús | 1–1 | Ponte Preta | Brazil | (Brazil) Estádio do Pacaembu, São Paulo | 28,959 | |
| 2013 | Argentina | Lanús | 2–0 | Ponte Preta | Brazil | (Argentina) Estadio Ciudad de Lanús, Lanús | 40,000 | |
| 2014 | Argentina | River Plate | 1–1 | Atlético Nacional | Colombia | (Colombia) Estadio Atanasio Girardot, Medellín | 44,412 | |
| 2014 | Argentina | River Plate | 2–0 | Atlético Nacional | Colombia | (Argentina) Estadio Antonio V. Liberti, Buenos Aires | 68,500 | |
| 2015 | Colombia | Santa Fe | 0–0 | Huracán | Argentina | (Argentina) Estadio Tomás A. Ducó, Buenos Aires | — | |
| 2015 | Colombia | Santa Fe | 0–0* (Note: Score was 0–0 on aggregate after 90 minutes and extra time. Santa Fe won the penalty shoot-out 3–1.) | Huracán | Argentina | (Colombia) Estadio El Campín, Bogotá | — | |
| 2016 | Brazil | Chapecoense | — | Atlético Nacional | Colombia | (Colombia) Estadio Atanasio Girardot, Medellín | — | |
| 2016 | Brazil | Chapecoense | — | Atlético Nacional | Colombia | (Brazil) Estádio Couto Pereira, Curitiba | — | |
| 2016 | Final was suspended following the crash of LaMia Flight 2933. CONMEBOL awarded the title to Chapecoense, following a request by Atlético Nacional. | | | | | | | |
| 2017 | Argentina | Independiente | 2–1 | Flamengo (LIB) | Brazil | (Argentina) Estadio Libertadores de América, Avellaneda | 45,000 | |
| 2017 | Argentina | Independiente | 1–1 | Flamengo (LIB) | Brazil | (Brazil) Maracanã, Rio de Janeiro | 62,567 | |
| 2018 | Brazil | Atlético Paranaense | 1–1 | Junior (LIB) | Colombia | (Colombia) Estadio Metropolitano, Barranquilla | 38,094 | |
| 2018 | Brazil | Atlético Paranaense | 1–1* (Note: Score was 2–2 on aggregate after 90 minutes and extra time. Athletico Paranaense won the penalty shoot-out 4–3.) | Junior (LIB) | Colombia | (Brazil) Arena da Baixada, Curitiba | 40,263 | |
Single match format
| 2019 | Ecuador | Independiente del Valle | 3–1 | Colón | Argentina | (Paraguay) Estadio General Pablo Rojas, Asunción (Note: The match was originally planned to be held at the Estadio Nacional, Lima, Peru, but it was moved due to Estadio Defensores del Chaco in Asunción, Paraguay due to safety concerns. The CONMEBOL then opted to change the venue again to Estadio General Pablo Rojas also in Asunción due to remodeling works at the Estadio Defensores del Chaco.) | 44,828 | |
| 2020 | Argentina | Defensa y Justicia (LIB) | 3–0 | Lanús | Argentina | (Argentina) Estadio Mario Alberto Kempes, Córdoba | 0 (Note: The 2020 final was played behind closed doors due to the COVID-19 pandemic in South America.) | |
| 2021 | Brazil | Athletico Paranaense | 1–0 | Red Bull Bragantino | Brazil | (Uruguay) Estadio Centenario, Montevideo | 20,000 | |
| 2022 | Ecuador | Independiente del Valle (LIB) | 2–0 | São Paulo | Brazil | (Argentina) Estadio Mario Alberto Kempes, Córdoba (Note: The match was originally planned to be held at the Estádio Nacional Mané Garrincha, Brasília, Brazil, but it was moved due to the 2022 Brazilian general election taking place a day later.) | 24,683 | |
| 2023 | Ecuador | LDU Quito | 1–1* (Note: Score was 1–1 after 90 minutes and extra time. LDU Quito won the penalty shoot-out 4–3.) | Fortaleza | Brazil | (Uruguay) Estadio Domingo Burgueño, Maldonado (Note: The match was originally planned to be held at the Estadio Centenario, Montevideo, Uruguay, but it was moved due to a CBF request.) | 17,420 | |
| 2024 | Argentina | Racing | 3–1 | Cruzeiro | Brazil | (Paraguay) Estadio General Pablo Rojas, Asunción | 43,828 | |
| 2025 | Argentina | Lanús | 0–0* (Note: Score was 0–0 after 90 minutes and extra time. Lanús won the penalty shoot-out 5–4.) | Atlético Mineiro | Brazil | (Paraguay) Estadio Defensores del Chaco, Asunción (Note: The match was originally planned to be held at the Estadio Ramón Tahuichi Aguilera, Santa Cruz de la Sierra, Bolivia, but it was moved to Estadio Defensores del Chaco in Asunción, Paraguay due to the original stadium not meeting the previously required adjustments.) | 44,164 | |
Upcoming matches
| Year | Country | Team 1 | Match | Team 2 | Country | Venue | Attendance | Refs |
| 2026 | Brazil | Atlético Mineiro | v | Boca Juniors | Argentina | (Colombia) Estadio Metropolitano, Barranquilla | | |
| 2027 | | | – | | | (Bolivia) Estadio Ramón Tahuichi Aguilera, Santa Cruz de la Sierra | | |

== Performances ==
=== By club ===
Performance in Copa Sudamericana finals by club
| Team | Won | Lost | Years won | Years lost |
|---|---|---|---|---|
| (Ecuador) LDU Quito | 2 | 1 | 2009, 2023 | 2011 |
| (Argentina) Lanús | 2 | 1 | 2013, 2025 | 2020 |
| (Argentina) Boca Juniors | 2 | 0 | 2004, 2005 | — |
| (Argentina) Independiente | 2 | 0 | 2010, 2017 | — |
| (Brazil) Athletico Paranaense | 2 | 0 | 2018, 2021 | — |
| (Ecuador) Independiente del Valle | 2 | 0 | 2019, 2022 | — |
| (Brazil) São Paulo | 1 | 1 | 2012 | 2022 |
| (Argentina) River Plate | 1 | 1 | 2014 | 2003 |
| (Argentina) San Lorenzo | 1 | 0 | 2002 | — |
| (Peru) Cienciano | 1 | 0 | 2003 | — |
| (Mexico) Pachuca | 1 | 0 | 2006 | — |
| (Argentina) Arsenal | 1 | 0 | 2007 | — |
| (Brazil) Internacional | 1 | 0 | 2008 | — |
| Universidad de Chile | 1 | 0 | 2011 | — |
| (Colombia) Santa Fe | 1 | 0 | 2015 | — |
| (Brazil) Chapecoense | 1 | 0 | 2016 | — |
| (Argentina) Defensa y Justicia | 1 | 0 | 2020 | — |
| (Argentina) Racing | 1 | 0 | 2024 | — |
| (Colombia) Atlético Nacional | 0 | 3 | — | 2002, 2014, 2016 |
| (Bolivia) Bolívar | 0 | 1 | — | 2004 |
| (Mexico) Pumas UNAM | 0 | 1 | — | 2005 |
| (Chile) Colo-Colo | 0 | 1 | — | 2006 |
| (Mexico) América | 0 | 1 | — | 2007 |
| (Argentina) Estudiantes | 0 | 1 | — | 2008 |
| (Brazil) Fluminense | 0 | 1 | — | 2009 |
| (Brazil) Goiás | 0 | 1 | — | 2010 |
| (Argentina) Tigre | 0 | 1 | — | 2012 |
| (Brazil) Ponte Preta | 0 | 1 | — | 2013 |
| (Argentina) Huracán | 0 | 1 | — | 2015 |
| (Brazil) Flamengo | 0 | 1 | — | 2017 |
| (Colombia) Junior | 0 | 1 | — | 2018 |
| (Argentina) Colón | 0 | 1 | — | 2019 |
| (Brazil) Red Bull Bragantino | 0 | 1 | — | 2021 |
| (Brazil) Fortaleza | 0 | 1 | — | 2023 |
| (Brazil) Cruzeiro | 0 | 1 | — | 2024 |
| (Brazil) Atlético Mineiro | 0 | 1 | — | 2025 |

=== By country ===
Performance in Copa Sudamericana finals by country
| Nation | Titles | Runners-up | Total |
|---|---|---|---|
| Argentina | 11 | 6 | 17 |
| Brazil | 5 | 9 | 14 |
| Ecuador | 4 | 1 | 5 |
| Colombia | 1 | 4 | 5 |
| Mexico | 1 | 2 | 3 |
| Chile | 1 | 1 | 2 |
| Peru | 1 | 0 | 1 |
| Bolivia | 0 | 1 | 1 |

== See also ==
- List of Copa Sudamericana winning managers
