= List of Copa Sudamericana winning managers =

This is a list of Copa Sudamericana winning football managers. Argentine manager Rubén Darío Insúa led San Lorenzo to success in the inaugural Copa Sudamericana final in 2002. Argentine clubs have been the most successful in the tournament, winning twelve titles.

No manager has won the tournament more than once. Argentine managers have led the winning team a record fifteen times.

== By year ==
| Final | Nat. | Winning manager | Club | Ref. |
|---|---|---|---|---|
| 2002 | ARG | Rubén Darío Insúa | (Argentina) San Lorenzo | |
| 2003 | PER | Freddy Ternero | (Peru) Cienciano | |
| 2004 | ARG | Jorge Benítez | (Argentina) Boca Juniors | |
| 2005 | ARG | Alfio Basile | (Argentina) Boca Juniors | |
| 2006 | MEX | Enrique Meza | (Mexico) Pachuca | |
| 2007 | ARG | Gustavo Alfaro | (Argentina) Arsenal | |
| 2008 | BRA | Tite | (Brazil) Internacional | |
| 2009 | URU | Jorge Fossati | (Ecuador) LDU Quito | |
| 2010 | ARG | Antonio Mohamed | (Argentina) Independiente | |
| 2011 | ARG | Jorge Sampaoli | (Chile) Universidad de Chile | |
| 2012 | BRA | Ney Franco | (Brazil) São Paulo | |
| 2013 | ARG | Guillermo Barros Schelotto | (Argentina) Lanús | |
| 2014 | ARG | Marcelo Gallardo | (Argentina) River Plate | |
| 2015 | URU | Gerardo Pelusso | (Colombia) Santa Fe | |
| 2016 | BRA | Caio Júnior (Note: The title was awarded to Chapecoense by CONMEBOL via the request of finalists Atlético Nacional, following LaMia Flight 2933.) | (Brazil) Chapecoense | |
| 2017 | ARG | Ariel Holan | (Argentina) Independiente | |
| 2018 | BRA | Tiago Nunes | (Brazil) Athletico Paranaense | |
| 2019 | ESP | Miguel Ángel Ramírez | (Ecuador) Independiente del Valle | |
| 2020 | ARG | Hernán Crespo | (Argentina) Defensa y Justicia | |
| 2021 | BRA | Alberto Valentim | (Brazil) Athletico Paranaense | |
| 2022 | ARG | Martín Anselmi | (Ecuador) Independiente del Valle | |
| 2023 | ARG | Luis Zubeldía | (Ecuador) LDU Quito | |
| 2024 | ARG | Gustavo Costas | (Argentina) Racing | |
| 2025 | ARG | Mauricio Pellegrino | (Argentina) Lanús | |
| 2026 | ARG | Rodolfo Arruabarrena | (Argentina) Boca Juniors | |

== By nationality ==
This table lists the total number of titles won by managers of each nationality.

| Nationality | Number of wins |
|---|---|
| Argentina | 15 |
| Brazil | 5 |
| Uruguay | 2 |
| Mexico | 1 |
| Peru | 1 |
| Spain | 1 |
