= Hernán Crespo =

Argentine footballer (born 1975)

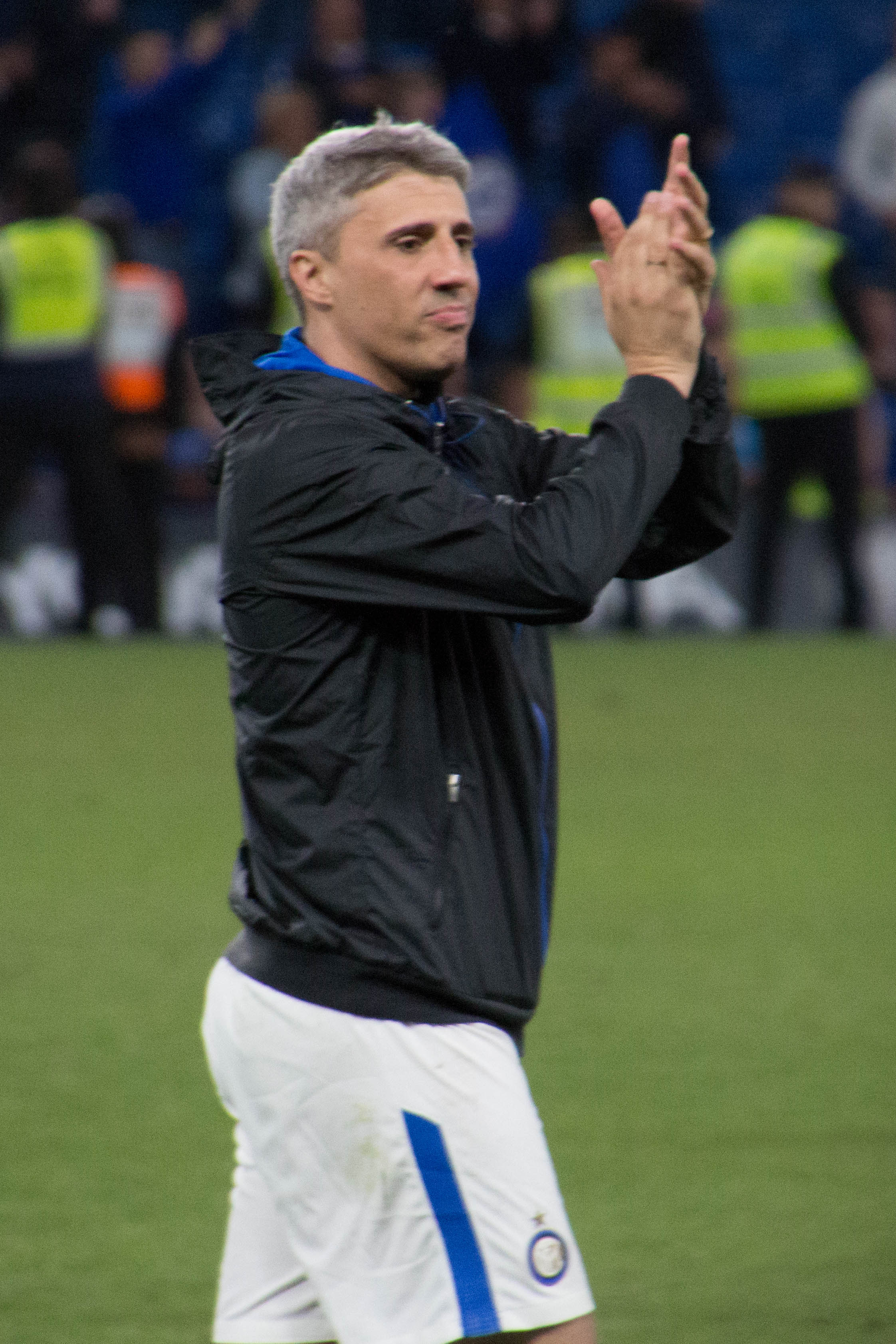
- Crespo in 2018

Personal information
- Full name: Hernán Jorge Crespo
- Date of birth: 5 July 1975 (age 51)
- Place of birth: Florida, Buenos Aires, Argentina
- Height: 1.85 m (6 ft 1 in)
- Position: Striker

Team information
- Current team: Atlas (head coach)

Youth career
- 1988–1993: River Plate

Senior career*
Years	Team	Apps	(Gls)
1993–1996	River Plate	64	(24)
1996–2000	Parma	116	(62)
2000–2002	Lazio	54	(39)
2002–2003	Inter Milan	18	(7)
2003–2008	Chelsea	49	(20)
2004–2005	→ AC Milan (loan)	28	(10)
2006–2008	→ Inter Milan (loan)	49	(18)
2008–2009	Inter Milan	14	(2)
2009–2010	Genoa	16	(5)
2010–2012	Parma	46	(10)
Total		453	(197)

International career
1996	Argentina U23	6	(6)
1995–2007	Argentina	64	(35)

Managerial career
- 2014–2015: Parma Primavera
- 2015–2016: Modena
- 2019: Banfield
- 2020–2021: Defensa y Justicia
- 2021: São Paulo
- 2022–2023: Al-Duhail
- 2023–2024: Al Ain
- 2025–2026: São Paulo
- 2026–: Atlas
Medal record
Men's football
Representing Argentina
Pan American Games
Gold medal – first place	1995 Mar del Plata	Team
Olympic Games
Silver medal – second place	1996 Atlanta	Team
- * Club domestic league appearances and goals

Hernán Jorge Crespo (Spanish pronunciation: [eɾˈnaŋ ˈxoɾxe ˈkɾespo]; born 5 July 1975) is an Argentine professional football coach and former player who is the current head coach of Liga MX club Atlas. During his playing career, Crespo is widely regarded as one of the best strikers in the history of the Argentina national team and one of the best of his generation.

A prolific striker, Crespo scored over 300 goals in a career spanning 19 years. At international level, he scored 35 goals and is Argentina's fifth highest goalscorer behind only Lautaro Martínez, Sergio Agüero, Gabriel Batistuta and Lionel Messi. He played in three FIFA World Cups: 1998, 2002, 2006. At club level, Crespo was the world's most expensive player when he was bought by Lazio from Parma in 2000 for €56 million (£35.5 million). He was top scorer in the 2000–01 Serie A with 26 goals, playing for Lazio. He is widely regarded as one of the best strikers of his generation.

Crespo's awards include three Serie A scudetti, a Copa Libertadores, a Premier League title and an Olympic Games silver medal. In 2004, he was named by Pelé in the FIFA 100 list of the world's greatest living players. Crespo never received a red card during his career.

== Club career ==
=== River Plate ===
Crespo made his debut with River Plate during the 1993–94 season, scoring 13 goals in 25 league appearances as River Plate won the Apertura league title. In 1996, he helped River win the Copa Libertadores, scoring twice in the home leg of the final in Buenos Aires.

=== Parma ===
Crespo left River Plate for Parma on 14 August 1996 after he won the silver medal with Argentina at the 1996 Summer Olympics and finished as the top scorer with six goals. He failed to score in his first six months at the club and was routinely booed, with head coach Carlo Ancelotti coming in for much criticism for keeping faith with the selection of Crespo. His faith, however, vindicated – Crespo went on to score 12 times in 27 matches in his first Serie A season and Parma finished runners-up to Juventus. The turning point was the standing applause he received for his brace against Cagliari in March 1997. Parma won the 1998–99 Coppa Italia and he scored the opening goal in Parma's 3–0 UEFA Cup final victory over Marseille. He had scored 80 goals in four seasons.

=== Lazio ===
In 2000, Lazio broke the then-world transfer record by paying £35 million (they paid £16 million in cash and transferred Matías Almeyda and Sérgio Conceição) to acquire Crespo, who in turn finished as Serie A's top scorer with 26 goals. Lazio, however, failed to defend its league title in 2001, and the following season, Crespo suffered from some injuries, while new signing Gaizka Mendieta failed to live up reputations, following the departures of playmakers Juan Sebastián Verón and Pavel Nedvěd. Crespo was left without the attacking support he had enjoyed in 2001, but still scored a respectable haul of goals. Lazio's financial problems, however, forced the club to sell several players, and following Alessandro Nesta's transfer to AC Milan, speculation over Crespo's future intensified.

=== Inter Milan ===
On 31 August 2002, Crespo signed with Inter Milan as a replacement for the departed Ronaldo for a €26 million fee and Bernardo Corradi. Lazio later re-valued Corradi to €5.5 million. Crespo was expected to shine again after suffering from injuries the last season at Lazio, and would be united with Christian Vieri, while Mohamed Kallon and Álvaro Recoba. After a positive start to the season that saw Inter briefly leading Serie A, a series of injuries would end up consistently depriving the club of their two main strikers, with Crespo missing almost 3 months of the season between January and April. Crespo ultimately scored 7 goals in 18 Serie A appearances as Inter finished 2nd, along with 9 goals in 12 Champions League matches as the team reached the Semi Finals.

Crespo was allowed to leave at the end of the season to join Chelsea who were looking for a proven European goalscorer. The move linked him back up with former Lazio colleague Juan Sebastian Veron.

=== Chelsea ===
Crespo was transferred to Premier League club Chelsea on 26 August 2003 for a fee of reported £16.8 million which also created a controversy in alleged false accounting. (Note: Inter bought Crespo for €38 million accounting value; however, the club split the amount in February 2003 into reported €4.45 million (which would amortize normally according to the length of player contract: i.e. proportionality, zero which his contract expires), and €33.55 million in special amortization fund in 10-year equal installment (which, although most of the players would leave the club within 10 years, the fund still appeared as an asset in balance sheet). Inter sold Crespo for an undisclosed fee, which created a huge profit if considering Crespo's value of below €4.45 million (the value weathered after his contract had excised for one year), but if considering Crespo left the club but still "worth" €30.195 million residual asset "value" in the special fund, the deal would create a huge loss. The auditor also wrote in a 2003–04 financial report that if the departure of Crespo combined with removing the value in the special fund would create a loss of c. €18.8 million ("qualora detta plusvalenza fosse state imputata a riduzione della voce "Oneri pluriennali da svalutazione diritti: sarebbe scaturita una maggior perdita di c. €18.8 millioni")) Following the transfer, Christian Vieri, Crespo's former strike partner at Inter, claimed that the club are essentially "weakening" by selling players of such caliber. He made his league debut on 30 August 2003 as a substitute for Adrian Mutu in a 2–2 home draw against Blackburn Rovers. On 16 September 2003, Crespo made his European debut, replacing Jimmy Floyd Hasselbaink in the 2003–04 Champions League group stage, which ended in a 1–0 away win after a late goal from William Gallas against Sparta Prague. Four days later, he scored his first goals, a double, in a 5–0 away victory against Wolverhampton Wanderers. Crespo made 73 appearances (26 as a substitute) in all competitions, scoring 25 goals.

==== Loan to AC Milan ====
After José Mourinho took over as Chelsea manager for the 2004–05 season, Crespo became surplus to Chelsea's plans following the arrival of Didier Drogba and was loaned to AC Milan, as requested by then-manager Carlo Ancelotti. He scored a total of ten league goals, and scored twice in the 2005 UEFA Champions League Final in a defeat to Liverpool.

In scoring a Champions League goal with Milan, Crespo became the first player to score with five teams in the competition, doing so with each of the sides he had played for since moving from South America to Europe in 1996.

==== Return to Chelsea ====
After Chelsea's failed attempts to land a big-name striker during the summer of 2005, Mourinho needed competition for Didier Drogba and decided to recall Crespo from Milan, convincing him that he had a future in England. Crespo made his first return appearance in a 2–1 FA Community Shield win over Arsenal. He scored his first league goal of 2005 against newly promoted Wigan Athletic in the 93rd minute of Chelsea's season opener in a 1–0 win, with a left foot curler into the top corner from 25 yards. The 2005–06 league title was Crespo's first league title victory in European football.

=== Return to Inter Milan ===
==== Second spell; loan from 2006 to 2008 ====
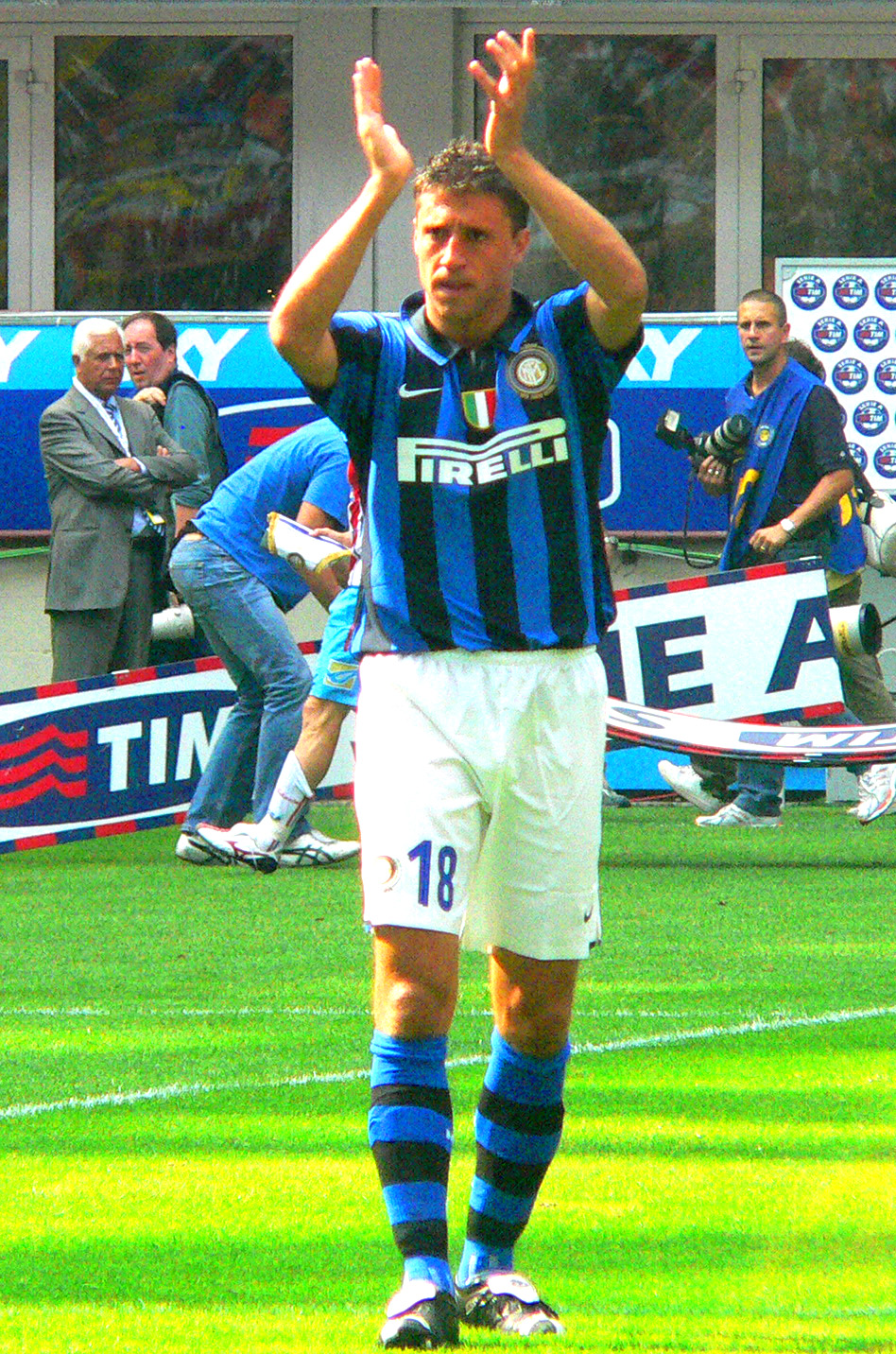
Crespo with Inter in 2007.

Though he scored 13 goals in all competitions and won the 2005–06 Premier League, Crespo requested a return to Italy in order to rejoin Milan, but Chelsea refused and announced that Crespo would remain a Chelsea player until the club accepted a suitable offer for him. On 7 August 2006, Crespo re-joined Inter on a two-year loan. He scored his 125th Serie A goal against Siena on 2 December 2006, and his 200th career goal in Europe on 2 April 2007. On 13 May, Crespo scored a hat-trick to help Inter defeat Lazio 4–3 and win the Scudetto.

==== Third spell; permanent deal ====
Crespo was released from Chelsea on 3 July 2008, following the expiration of his contract, and was signed by Inter on a one-year contract for free. In the 2008–09 season, under José Mourinho, his former manager at Chelsea, Crespo only made 13 Serie A appearances, including two starts. He was excluded from the Champions League squad.

=== Genoa ===
Following the expiration of his contract at Inter, Crespo was quickly snapped up by Genoa, taking Diego Milito's place, who moved in the opposite direction. On 8 June 2009, it was reported that Crespo had a medical check to formalize his transfer. Crespo cited his ambition to make the Argentina 2010 World Cup squad as one of his key reasons for making the move to Genoa. On 13 September, Crespo scored his first goal of the 2009 season against Napoli.

=== Return to Parma and retirement ===
In January 2010, Crespo returned to Parma after the club agreed the deal with Atalanta and Genoa. Crespo replaced Nicola Amoruso who left for Atalanta, while Atalanta's Robert Acquafresca moved to Genoa to replace Crespo. The Argentine striker returned after ten years to Parma. Crespo scored just once before the season's end, against Livorno. The striker enjoyed a more successful 2010–11 season, scoring eleven goals. In doing so, he became Parma's top scorer for a fourth time, which remains a post-war club record. Despite mounting speculation of his departure, Crespo signed a one-year contract extension on 30 June 2011. However, a lack of first-team opportunities saw Crespo and Parma mutually agree to terminate his contract on 2 February 2012, although he did vow to return to the city he had fallen in love with. He is the club's all-time record goalscorer with 94 goals in 201 appearances.

Although Crespo was signed to play in Bengal Premier League Soccer in late January 2012, with a salary of £533,000 for the two-month tournament, the competition never got underway. He clarified that his career as a footballer had finished in November 2012.

== International career ==
Crespo won his first cap for Argentina in a friendly match against Bulgaria in February 1995. He was a member of the Argentina side that finished runners-up in the 1995 King Fahd Cup, the predecessor to the FIFA Confederations Cup. In 1996, Crespo was a member of the Argentina men's football squad for the Olympic Games. Crespo helped take Argentina to the final with braces against Spain in the quarter-final and Portugal in the semi-final. However, Argentina lost the final to Nigeria, despite Crespo scoring his sixth goal of the tournament from the penalty spot. Crespo scored his first goal for the Argentina senior team in a 1998 World Cup qualifier against Ecuador and hit a hat-trick against FR Yugoslavia in a pre-World Cup friendly. Crespo was called up to the final roster for the 1998 World Cup but only made one substitute appearance, as Gabriel Batistuta led the Argentine attack. Crespo's attempt was saved by David Seaman in the second round penalty shoot-out with England, but Argentina progressed 4–3.

During qualification for the 2002 World Cup, Crespo was top scorer for Argentina with nine goals as they topped the South American group. During the finals, Batistuta was again preferred to Crespo as Argentina's starting centre forward. Crespo appeared as a substitute in all three group matches, including the final match against Sweden, which Argentina needed to win in order to qualify for the second round. Though Crespo scored an 88th-minute equaliser, it was not to be enough and Argentina were eliminated.

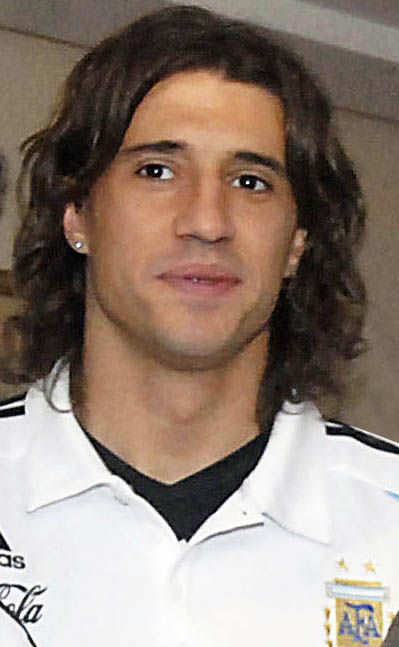
Crespo with Argentina in 2007

After the 2002 World Cup, Batistuta retired from international football, and Crespo took over as Argentina's number 9. During the 2006 World Cup qualifying stage, Crespo scored seven times, including two goals in Argentina's 3–1 win over arch-rivals Brazil in Buenos Aires, which sealed qualification and made him Argentina's career scoring leader in World Cup qualifiers.

Crespo scored Argentina's first goal of the 2006 World Cup in their opening match against the Ivory Coast. He also scored in the next game against Serbia and Montenegro (6–0) and the second round match against Mexico. However, Argentina's run was ended as they were knocked out by host nation Germany on penalties in the quarter-final.

Crespo's final appearances for Argentina came at 2007 Copa América. He scored twice in Argentina's 4–1 victory over the United States in their Group C opener, tying Diego Maradona's team scoring record. He then overtook Maradona in Argentina's second match, scoring a penalty kick against Colombia. However, he substituted immediately after converting the kick due to injury and missed the remainder of the tournament.

After the Copa América, Crespo did not receive any further call-ups to the national team and ended his international career with 35 goals in 64 matches, being currently Argentina's fifth highest goalscorer of all time.

== Style of play ==
Crespo was a fast, tenacious, powerful, and complete striker, who possessed good technique, composure in possession, and an eye for goal; he also excelled in the air. A prolific and opportunistic goal scorer, he was capable of finishing well both with his feet and with his head, and was known for his ability to score acrobatic goals. He was effective off the ball due to his work-rate, tactical intelligence, and attacking movement, which he often used to provide depth for his team or create space for his teammates; he was also capable of linking up well with other forwards. Due to his goalscoring ability and wide range of skills, he is regarded as one of the best strikers of his generation, and as one of Serie A's best ever foreign players. He faced several injuries throughout his career, which limited his playing time.

=== Nicknames ===
While commonly known as Hernán, Crespo was christened Hernando Jorge Crespo, after his grandfather of the same name. His most common nickname is "Valdanito", after legendary compatriot striker Jorge Valdano, as he was thought to be his heir due to their similar appearance and eye for goal. He is also, although less often, called "El Polaco" (or "The Pole"), as his family addressed him that way in his youth because of his light hair.

== Media ==
Crespo was sponsored by sportswear company Nike and appeared in Nike commercials. In a global Nike advertising campaign in the run-up to the 2002 World Cup in Korea and Japan, Crespo starred in a "Secret Tournament" commercial (branded "Scorpion KO") directed by Terry Gilliam, appearing alongside footballers such as Thierry Henry, Ronaldo, Francesco Totti, Ronaldinho, Luís Figo, Roberto Carlos and Hidetoshi Nakata, with former player Eric Cantona as the tournament "referee".

== Post-playing and managerial career ==
=== Coach: Parma and Modena ===
On 12 November 2012, Crespo announced that he would pursue a career in coaching and would begin work in early July 2013.

He served as youth coach for the Primavera team of Parma during the 2014–15 season. After the disbandment of Parma, on 30 June 2015, Crespo was announced as the new manager of Serie B club Modena. He was sacked on 26 March 2016, with the club one point above the relegation zone.

=== Back to Parma ===
On 22 June 2017, Chinese businessman Jiang Lizhang bought 60% of the stocks of Parma, and assigned Crespo as the new vice president of the club. He worked for Jiang's company Desport as a technical adviser beforehand.

On 2 January 2018, with the club opting to remove the figure of vice-president from its board, Crespo was named new club ambassador.

=== Banfield ===
On 19 December 2018, Crespo was appointed manager of Argentine Primera División side Banfield, on an 18-month deal. After finishing 16th in his first season, he was sacked five games into the next in September 2019, having won just one of those games.

=== Defensa y Justicia ===
On 25 January 2020, Crespo was appointed manager of Defensa y Justicia, also in the Argentine top tier. On 23 January 2021, he led Defensa y Justicia to their first international trophy by winning the Copa Sudamericana, after defeating Lanús by 3–0.

=== São Paulo ===
On 12 February 2021, Crespo was appointed manager of Brazilian Série A club São Paulo on a two-year deal. He made his debut 16 days later on the first day of the Campeonato Paulista, in a 1–1 home draw with Botafogo. He won the title on 23 May, after a 2–0 aggregate victory over Palmeiras; this was the club's first honour in nine years, and the first in the competition since 2005.

On 13 October 2021, Crespo left São Paulo by a mutual agreement. The club were 13th in the national league after 25 games, and he was replaced by team icon Rogério Ceni.

=== Al-Duhail ===
On 24 March 2022, Crespo succeeded Luís Castro at Al-Duhail in the Qatar Stars League. In his first season, he won a treble of the league, Qatar Cup and Qatari Stars Cup, while also reaching the semi-finals of the AFC Champions League. On 11 October 2023, he left his position at the club by mutual consent.

=== Al Ain ===
After leaving Al-Duhail Crespo was signed by Al Ain in November 2023. He then led the team to the Asian Champions League final, where they beat Yokohama F. Marinos. In the 2024–25 season following some bad results, including a 5–1 defeat to Cristiano Ronaldo's Al Nassr, the club decided to dismiss him.

=== Return to São Paulo ===
On 18 June 2025, Crespo rejoined São Paulo as head coach on a deal running until December 2026. The following 9 March, despite sitting second in the league, he was sacked.

=== Atlas ===
In July 2026, Crespo was appointed head coach of Atlas in Mexico's top flight.

== Personal life ==
In May 2005, Crespo married Italian equestrian Alessia Andra Rossi, with whom he has three daughters, Nicole, Sofia and Martina. They divorced in 2019. In October 2024, he got engaged to Argentine influencer Antonella Silguero.

== Literature ==
- Il bulgaro che fu re di Parma per un giorno (The Bulgarian who was king of Parma for a day), by Luca Farinotti, Parma, Diabasis, 2019, Anthology Parma The Capital of Culture 2020. ISBN 978-88-8103-948-7, is the novel of the true story of Crespo's farewell football match. The tale's title comes from the winning assist by the Bulgarian Valeri Bojinov to Crespo at the last second.

== Career statistics ==
=== Club ===
Appearances and goals by club, season and competition
Club	Season	League			National cup (Note: Includes Coppa Italia, FA Cup)		League cup (Note: Includes Football League Cup)		Continental		Other		Total	
Club	Season	Division	Apps	Goals	Apps	Goals	Apps	Goals	Apps	Goals	Apps	Goals	Apps	Goals
River Plate	1993–94	Primera División	25	16	—		—		3	0	—		28	16
River Plate	1994–95	Primera División	18	4	—		—		4	2	—		22	6
River Plate	1995–96	Primera División	21	4	—		—		13	10	—		34	14
River Plate	Total		64	24	—		—		20	12	—		84	36
Parma	1996–97	Serie A	27	12	1	0	—		—		—		28	12
Parma	1997–98	Serie A	25	12	2	0	—		8 (Note: Appearances in UEFA Champions League)	2	—		35	14
Parma	1998–99	Serie A	30	16	7	6	—		8 (Note: Appearances in UEFA Cup)	6	—		45	28
Parma	1999–2000	Serie A	34	22	2	1	–		5 (Note: One appearance in UEFA Champions League, four appearances and three goals in UEFA Cup)	3	2 (Note: One appearance and one goal in Supercoppa Italiana, one appearance in Serie A – UEFA Champions League play-off)	1	43	27
Parma	Total		116	62	12	6	—		21	11	2	1	151	80
Lazio	2000–01	Serie A	32	26	1	0	—		6	2	1 (Note: Appearance in Supercoppa Italiana)	0	40	28
Lazio	2001–02	Serie A	22	13	4	4	—		7	3	—		33	20
Lazio	Total		54	39	5	4	—		13	5	1	0	73	48
Inter Milan	2002–03	Serie A	18	7	0	0	—		12	9	—		30	16
Chelsea	2003–04	Premier League	19	10	0	0	2	0	10	2	—		31	12
Chelsea	2005–06	Premier League	30	10	5	1	1	0	5	2	1 (Note: Appearance in FA Community Shield)	0	42	13
Chelsea	Total		49	20	5	1	3	0	15	4	1	0	73	25
AC Milan (loan)	2004–05	Serie A	28	10	1	1	—		10	6	1	0	40	17
Inter Milan (loan)	2006–07	Serie A	29	14	4	4	—		6	1	1	1	40	20
Inter Milan (loan)	2007–08	Serie A	19	4	5	2	—		5	1	—		29	7
Inter Milan (loan)	Total		48	18	9	6	—		11	2	1	1	69	27
Inter Milan	2008–09	Serie A	14	2	3	0	—		0	0	—		17	2
Genoa	2009–10	Serie A	16	5	1	0	—		4 (Note: Appearances in UEFA Europa League)	2	—		21	7
Parma	2009–10	Serie A	13	1	0	0	—		—		—		13	1
Parma	2010–11	Serie A	29	9	2	2	—		—		—		31	11
Parma	2011–12	Serie A	4	0	2	2	—		—		—		6	2
Parma	Total		46	10	4	4	—		—		—		50	14
Career total			453	197	40	22	3	0	106	51	6	2	608	272

=== International ===
Appearances and goals by national team and year
National team	Year	Apps	Goals
Argentina	1995	1	0
Argentina	1996	2	0
Argentina	1997	9	3
Argentina	1998	3	3
Argentina	1999	4	1
Argentina	2000	8	4
Argentina	2001	6	6
Argentina	2002	4	2
Argentina	2003	5	3
Argentina	2004	4	1
Argentina	2005	7	6
Argentina	2006	6	3
Argentina	2007	5	3
Total		64	35

Scores and results list Argentina's goal tally first, score column indicates score after each Crespo goal.

List of international goals scored by Hernán Crespo
No.	Date	Venue	Opponent	Score	Result	Competition
1	30 April 1997	El Monumental, Buenos Aires, Argentina	Ecuador	2–0	2–1	1998 FIFA World Cup qualification
2	8 June 1997	El Monumental, Buenos Aires, Argentina	Peru	1–0	2–0	1998 FIFA World Cup qualification
3	20 July 1997	El Monumental, Buenos Aires, Argentina	Venezuela	1–0	2–0	1998 FIFA World Cup qualification
4	24 February 1998	Estadio José María Minella, Mar del Plata, Argentina	FR Yugoslavia	1–0	3–1	Friendly
5	24 February 1998	Estadio José María Minella, Mar del Plata, Argentina	FR Yugoslavia	2–1	3–1	Friendly
6	24 February 1998	Estadio José María Minella, Mar del Plata, Argentina	FR Yugoslavia	3–1	3–1	Friendly
7	4 September 1999	El Monumental, Buenos Aires, Argentina	Brazil	2–0	2–0	Friendly
8	26 April 2000	Estadio José Pachencho Romero, Maracaibo, Venezuela	Venezuela	4–0	4–0	2002 FIFA World Cup qualification
9	29 June 2000	Estadio El Campín, Bogotá, Colombia	Colombia	3–1	3–1	2002 FIFA World Cup qualification
10	19 July 2000	El Monumental, Buenos Aires, Argentina	Ecuador	1–0	2–0	2002 FIFA World Cup qualification
11	3 September 2000	Estadio Nacional, Lima, Peru	Peru	1–0	2–1	2002 FIFA World Cup qualification
12	28 February 2001	Stadio Olimpico, Rome, Italy	Italy	2–1	2–1	Friendly
13	28 March 2001	El Monumental, Buenos Aires, Argentina	Venezuela	1–0	5–0	2002 FIFA World Cup qualification
14	28 April 2001	Estadio Hernando Siles, La Paz, Bolivia	Bolivia	1–1	3–3	2002 FIFA World Cup qualification
15	28 April 2001	Estadio Hernando Siles, La Paz, Bolivia	Bolivia	2–3	3–3	2002 FIFA World Cup qualification
16	3 June 2001	El Monumental, Buenos Aires, Argentina	Colombia	3–0	3–0	2002 FIFA World Cup qualification
17	15 August 2001	Estadio Olímpico Atahualpa, Quito, Ecuador	Ecuador	2–0	2–0	2002 FIFA World Cup qualification
18	12 June 2002	Hitomebore Stadium Miyagi, Rifu, Miyagi, Japan	Sweden	1–1	1–1	2002 FIFA World Cup
19	20 November 2002	Saitama Stadium, Saitama, Japan	Japan	2–0	2–0	Friendly
20	9 September 2003	Estadio Olímpico, Caracas, Venezuela	Venezuela	2–0	3–0	2006 FIFA World Cup qualification
21	15 November 2003	El Monumental, Buenos Aires, Argentina	Bolivia	2–0	3–0	2006 FIFA World Cup qualification
22	19 November 2003	Estadio Metropolitano, Barranquilla, Colombia	Colombia	1–0	1–1	2006 FIFA World Cup qualification
23	30 March 2004	El Monumental, Buenos Aires, Argentina	Ecuador	1–0	1–0	2006 FIFA World Cup qualification
24	9 February 2005	LTU-Arena, Düsseldorf, Germany	Germany	1–1	2–2	Friendly
25	9 February 2005	LTU-Arena, Düsseldorf, Germany	Germany	2–2	2–2	Friendly
26	30 March 2005	El Monumental, Buenos Aires, Argentina	Colombia	1–0	1–0	2006 FIFA World Cup qualification
27	8 June 2005	El Monumental, Buenos Aires, Argentina	Brazil	1–0	3–1	2006 FIFA World Cup qualification
28	8 June 2005	El Monumental, Buenos Aires, Argentina	Brazil	3–0	3–1	2006 FIFA World Cup qualification
29	12 November 2005	Stade de Genève, Geneva, Switzerland	England	1–0	2–3	Friendly
30	10 June 2006	FIFA WM Stadion Hamburg, Hamburg, Germany	Ivory Coast	1–0	2–1	2006 FIFA World Cup
31	16 June 2006	FIFA WM Stadion Gelsenkirchen, Gelsenkirchen, Germany	Serbia and Montenegro	4–0	6–0	2006 FIFA World Cup
32	24 June 2006	Zentralstadion, Leipzig, Germany	Mexico	1–1	2–1	2006 FIFA World Cup
33	28 June 2007	Estadio José Pachencho Romero, Maracaibo, Venezuela	United States	1–1	4–1	2007 Copa América
34	28 June 2007	Estadio José Pachencho Romero, Maracaibo, Venezuela	United States	2–1	4–1	2007 Copa América
35	2 July 2007	Estadio José Pachencho Romero, Maracaibo, Venezuela	Colombia	1–1	4–2	2007 Copa América

== Managerial statistics ==
As of match played 20 November 2026

Managerial record by team and tenure
Team	Nat	From	To	Record							
Team	Nat	From	To	G	W	D	L	GF	GA	GD	Win %
Modena	(Italy)	1 July 2015	26 March 2016	35	11	5	19	31	40	−9	31.43
Banfield	(Argentina)	1 January 2019	3 September 2019	18	4	6	8	21	26	−5	22.22
Defensa y Justicia	(Argentina)	27 January 2020	7 February 2021	33	14	10	9	49	42	+7	42.42
São Paulo	(Brazil)	12 February 2021	13 October 2021	53	24	19	10	88	49	+39	45.28
Al-Duhail	(Qatar)	24 March 2022	3 October 2023	50	35	8	7	114	67	+47	70.00
Al Ain	(United Arab Emirates)	14 November 2023	6 November 2024	49	22	7	20	99	83	+16	44.90
São Paulo	(Brazil)	18 June 2025	9 March 2026	46	21	7	18	56	56	+0	45.65
Atlas	(Mexico)	16 July 2026	present	19	8	4	7	30	36	−6	42.11
Total				303	139	66	98	478	399	+79	45.87

== Honours ==
=== Player ===
River Plate

- Argentine Primera División: 1993 (Apertura), 1994 (Apertura)
- Copa Libertadores: 1996

Parma

- Coppa Italia: 1998–99
- Supercoppa Italiana: 1999
- UEFA Cup: 1998–99

Lazio

- Supercoppa Italiana: 2000

AC Milan

- Supercoppa Italiana: 2004
- UEFA Champions League runner-up: 2004–05

Chelsea

- Premier League: 2005–06
- FA Community Shield: 2005

Inter Milan

- Serie A: 2006–07, 2007–08, 2008–09
- Supercoppa Italiana: 2006, 2008
- Coppa Italia runner-up: 2006–07, 2007–08

Argentina

- Pan American Games Gold Medal: 1995
- Olympic Games Silver Medal: 1996

Individual

- Argentine Primera División top scorer: 1993–94
- Football at the Summer Olympics top scorer: 1996 (shared)
- UEFA Cup Final Man of the Match: 1999
- Coppa Italia top scorer: 1998–99, 2006–07 (shared)
- Serie A top scorer: 2000–01
- ESM Team of the Year: 2000–01
- FIFA 100
- FIFA World Cup Silver Shoe: 2006
- FIFA World Cup All-star team: 2006
- FIFPro World XI nominee: 2005, 2006

=== Manager ===
Defensa y Justicia

- Copa Sudamericana: 2020

São Paulo

- Campeonato Paulista: 2021

Al-Duhail

- Qatar Stars League: 2022–23
- Qatari Stars Cup: 2022–23
- Qatar Cup: 2023

Al Ain

- AFC Champions League: 2023–24

Individual

- Copa Sudamericana Manager of the Year: 2020
- Campeonato Paulista Manager of the Tournament: 2021
