= Nicolás Martínez (footballer, born 1984) =

Argentine footballer

Personal information
- Full name: Nicolás Martínez
- Date of birth: 20 June 1984 (age 42)
- Place of birth: Morón, Argentina
- Height: 1.75 m (5 ft 9 in)
- Position: Defender

Team information
- Current team: Fénix de Pilar

Youth career
- Deportivo Morón

Senior career*
Years	Team	Apps	(Gls)
2004–2009	Deportivo Morón	82	(2)
2009–2010	Acassuso	28	(1)
2010–2011	Flandria	32	(1)
2011–2013	Tigre	6	(0)
2013–2014	Tristán Suárez	26	(1)
2014–2015	Colegiales	47	(3)
2016	Fénix de Pilar	19	(1)
2016–2021	Deportivo Morón	95	(1)
2021	Sol de Mayo	27	(1)
2022–	Fénix de Pilar	14	(2)
- * Club domestic league appearances and goals as of 17:47, 14 July 2022 (UTC)

Nicolás Martínez (born 20 June 1984) is an Argentine professional footballer who plays as a defender for Fénix de Pilar.

== Career ==
Martínez started his career in 2004 with Deportivo Morón of Primera B Metropolitana, remaining for five years whilst scoring two goals in eighty-two fixtures. 2009 saw the defender agree to join Acassuso, which was followed by a stint with Flandria a year later. On 1 August 2011, Martínez joined Argentine Primera División side Tigre. He failed to make a league appearance throughout 2011–12, but did feature four times in the club's run to the Copa Argentina quarter-finals; where they lost 2–1 to Deportivo Merlo, with Martínez netting their only goal. He was also on the bench for their 2012 Copa Sudamericana finals second leg loss to São Paulo.

In June 2013, having been selected for six Primera División fixtures in 2012–13 for Tigre, Martínez completed a move to Tristán Suárez. He scored his first goal in his third match for them versus Estudiantes on 29 September. Martínez left in June 2014, with spells subsequently arriving with Colegiales and Fénix in the following two years before he sealed a return to former club Deportivo Morón ahead of the 2016–17 Primera B Metropolitana; which they ended as champions, Martínez featured twenty-five times.

== Personal life ==
Martínez is the brother of fellow footballer Román Martínez.

== Career statistics ==
As of 18 December 2018.

Club statistics
Club	Season	League			Cup (Note: Includes the Copa Argentina)		League Cup		Continental		Other		Total	
Club	Season	Division	Apps	Goals	Apps	Goals	Apps	Goals	Apps	Goals	Apps	Goals	Apps	Goals
Acassuso	2009–10	Primera B Metropolitana	28	1	0	0	—		—		0	0	28	1
Flandria	2010–11	Primera B Metropolitana	32	1	0	0	—		—		0	0	31	1
Tigre	2011–12	Primera División	0	0	4	1	—		—		0	0	4	1
Tigre	2012–13	Primera División	6	0	1	0	—		1 (Note: One appearance in the 2013 Copa Libertadores)	0	0	0	8	0
Tigre	Total		6	0	5	1	—		1	0	0	0	12	1
Tristán Suárez	2013–14	Primera B Metropolitana	26	1	1	0	—		—		0	0	27	1
Colegiales	2014	Primera B Metropolitana	18	1	1	0	—		—		0	0	19	1
Colegiales	2015	Primera B Metropolitana	29	2	0	0	—		—		0	0	29	2
Colegiales	Total		47	3	1	0	—		—		0	0	48	3
Fénix	2016	Primera B Metropolitana	19	1	0	0	—		—		0	0	19	1
Deportivo Morón	2016–17	Primera B Metropolitana	25	0	2	0	—		—		0	0	27	0
Deportivo Morón	2017–18	Primera B Nacional	20	0	3	0	—		—		0	0	23	0
Deportivo Morón	2018–19	Primera B Nacional	12	0	1	0	—		—		0	0	13	0
Deportivo Morón	Total		57	0	6	0	—		—		0	0	63	0
Career total			215	7	13	1	—		1	0	0	0	229	8

== Honours ==
Deportivo Morón

- Primera B Metropolitana: 2016–17
