= Sebastián Cejas =

Argentine footballer

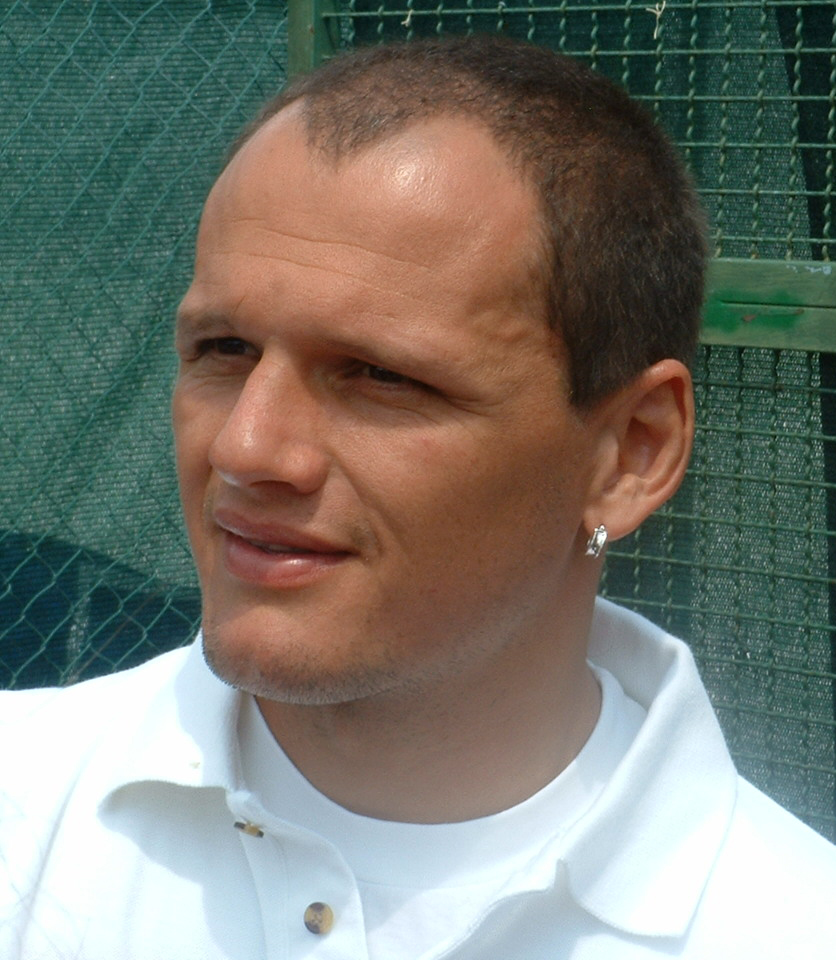
- Cejas in 2005

Personal information
- Full name: Christian Sebastián Cejas
- Date of birth: 21 April 1975 (age 51)
- Place of birth: Gualeguay, Argentina
- Height: 1.83 m (6 ft 0 in)
- Position: Goalkeeper

Team information
- Current team: Sportivo Las Parejas (manager)

Youth career
- 1985–1994: Newell's Old Boys

Senior career*
Years	Team	Apps	(Gls)
1994–2001	Newell's Old Boys	172	(6)
2001–2002	Roma	0	(0)
2002	→ Siena (loan)	17	(0)
2002–2003	Ascoli	35	(1)
2003–2006	Fiorentina	55	(0)
2006	Empoli	6	(0)
2006–2007	Colo-Colo	50	(0)
2007	Gimnasia LP	18	(0)
2009	Pisa	12	(0)
2009–2011	Chacarita Juniors	19	(1)

Managerial career
- 2015–2016: Newell's Old Boys (goalkeeping coach)
- 2018–2020: Vélez Sarsfield (goalkeeping coach)
- 2021–2022: Santamarina
- 2023: Argentino de Rosario (assistant)
- 2024–: Sportivo Las Parejas
- * Club domestic league appearances and goals

Christian Sebastián Cejas (born 21 April 1975) is an Argentine football manager and former player who manages Sportivo Las Parejas. A former goalkeeper and nicknamed Terremoto (Earthquake), he played for teams such as Newell's Old Boys, Fiorentina, and Colo-Colo.

== Club career ==
Cejas began his career in 1994 in his native country Argentina, where he appeared in 170 games and scored six goals for Newell's Old Boys. From there he was transferred to Serie A side Roma in 2001. While with Newell's Old Boys, Cejas was a regular with the first team. That was not the case while he was with Roma, where he never appeared in a match. Cejas was loaned out to the than Serie B club Siena, where he appeared in the last seventeen games of the season. From there he was transferred to a Serie B club Ascoli. There he appeared in 35 games and scored a rare goal for goalkeeper in Italian football.

Cejas was then sold to another Serie B squad Fiorentina. Prior to his arrival, Fiorentina had gained promotion from Serie C2 to Serie C1. However, because of Caso Catania, Fiorentina gained promotion to Serie B. Cejas than helped complete the remarkable comeback of Fiorentina to Serie A. He appeared in 55 league games with the club before being sold to Empoli.

On 25 January 2006, Fiorentina acquired goalkeeper Gianluca Berti from Empoli in exchange for Cejas. However he only appeared in six games with Empoli before asking the club to terminate his contract. Cejas was upset that he had been dropped from the first team squad.

After Colo-Colo won the 2006 Apertura in Chile, their goalkeeper Claudio Bravo, made a move to La Liga club Real Sociedad, leaving them without a goalkeeper. Colo-Colo then signed Cejas as a replacement. He helped Colo-Colo win the 2006 Clausura and 2007 Apertura, as well as reaching the 2006 Copa Sudamericana Finals.

In July 2008, Cejas joined Premier League club Hull City on trial, but was not offered a contract by the Premier League newcomers. On 22 February 2009, Serie B club Pisa announced the signing of Cejas on a free transfer as a replacement for outgoing veternal keeper Daniele Balli.

== Coaching career ==
Cejas served as goalkeeping coach of both Newell's Old Boys and Vélez Sarsfield before becoming the manager of Santamarina in the Primera B Nacional. In 2023, he served as assistant of Daniel Fagiani in Argentino de Rosario. The next year, he assumed as the manager of Sportivo Las Parejas.

== Personal life ==
His younger brother Mauro Cejas is also a former professional footballer.

== Honours ==
Colo-Colo

- Primera División de Chile: 2006 Clausura, 2007 Apertura
