= Ramiro Leone =

Argentine footballer (born 1977)

Personal information
- Full name: Ramiro Leone
- Date of birth: June 1, 1977 (age 49)
- Place of birth: Rosario, Argentina
- Height: 1.73 m (5 ft 8 in)
- Position: Left winger

Team information
- Current team: All Boys
- Number: 23

Senior career*
Years	Team	Apps	(Gls)
1994–1995	Central Córdoba	18	(5)
1996–2000	Gimnasia y Tiro	47	(5)
1997	→ F.C. Atlas (loan)	0	(0)
2000–2001	Central Córdoba	22	(1)
2001–2002	Gimnasia y Tiro de Salta	3	(1)
2002–2004	Argentinos Juniors	53	(6)
2004–2005	Nueva Chicago	37	(3)
2005–2006	El Porvenir	32	(3)
2006–2007	Chacarita Juniors	31	(1)
2007–2009	San Martín de Tucumán	53	(5)
2009–2014	Tigre	135	(5)
2014–	All Boys	26	(0)
- * Club domestic league appearances and goals as of 25 April 2015

Ramiro Leone (born 1 June 1977 in Rosario) is an Argentine football midfielder who plays for All Boys.

== Career ==
Leone began his playing career in the Argentine 2nd division in 1994 with Central Córdoba. Between 1996 and 2000 he played for Gimnasia y Tiro de Salta. He had a loan spell with Mexican side F.C. Atlas in 1997, but returned to play for GyT in the Primera División in 1998.

In 2000, he returned to Central Córdoba before a second stint with Gimnasia y Tiro between 2001 and 2002, this time in the regionalised 3rd division.

In 2002 Leone returned to the 2nd tier playing for Argentinos Juniors until 2004, he then had one year stints with Nueva Chicago, El Porvenir and Chacarita Juniors before joining San Martín de Tucumán in 2007. He was part of the squad that won the Primera B Nacional championship in 2007-08 and promotion to the Primera División.

Leone played one season in the Primera with San Martín before their relegation at the end of the season. During the winter 2009 transfer window he joined Club Atlético Tigre.

== Titles ==
Season	Team	Title
2007-08	San Martín de Tucumán	Primera B Nacional
