= Josimar Mosquera =

Colombian footballer (born 1982)

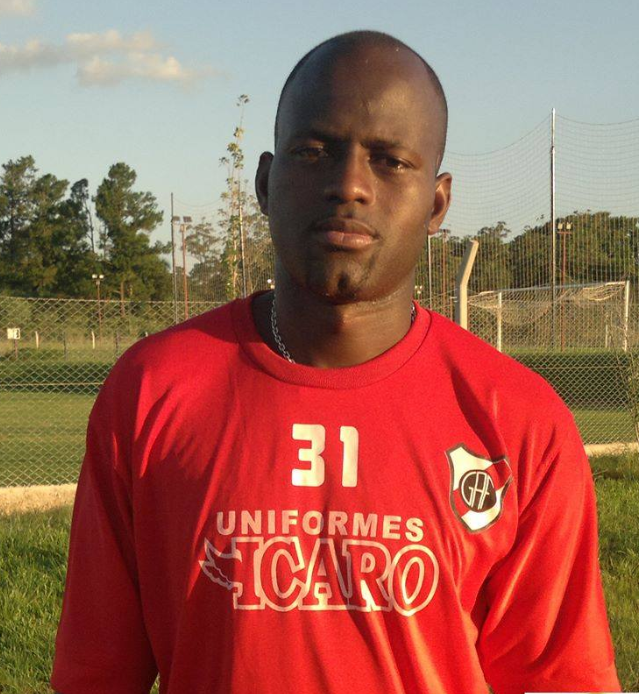

Personal information
- Full name: Josimar Mosquera Angulo
- Date of birth: October 12, 1982 (age 44)
- Place of birth: Caucasia, Colombia
- Height: 1.86 m (6 ft 1 in)
- Position: Defender

Senior career*
Years	Team	Apps	(Gls)
2003–2005	Bajo Cauca	40	(3)
2005–2006	Godoy Cruz	55	(3)
2006–2007	Estudiantes	13	(1)
2007–2010	Arsenal de Sarandí	49	(2)
2009	→ Al-Ahli (loan)	8	(0)
2010	→ Colón de Santa Fe (loan)	2	(0)
2011	Atlético Nacional	18	(0)
2011–2012	Independiente Rivadavia	26	(0)
2012–2013	Gimnasia y Esgrima de Jujuy	31	(1)
2013	Cobresal	15	(0)
2014	Santamarina de Tandil	15	(2)
2015	Guaraní Antonio Franco	21	(0)
2016–2017	Almirante Brown	19	(1)
2017–2018	J.J. de Urquiza	?	(?)
2019–	Ferrocarril Roca de Las Flores		

International career
2008–2009	Colombia	2	(0)
- * Club domestic league appearances and goals as of 3 January 2018

Josimar Mosquera Angulo (born 12 October 1982) is a Colombian football defender who currently plays for Argentine club J.J. de Urquiza.

== Career ==
Mosquera started his career in Argentine football with Godoy Cruz de Mendoza of the Argentine 2nd Division. In 2005, he was part of the team that won the Apertura 2005 tournament, and at the end of the 2005-2006 season Godoy Cruz were promoted to the Primera Division for the first time in their history.

In 2006 Mosquera was signed by Estudiantes de La Plata, and in his first season with the club they won the Apertura 2006 title, but Mosquera watched from the sidelines as he did not play any first team games.

During the Clausura 2007 Mosquera made the breakthrough into the first team and scored his only goal for the club in a 2–0 win over Club Atlético Banfield. At the end of the clausura he moved to Arsenal.

In 2009 Mosquera joined Al-Ahli in Saudi Arabia and was loaned out to Colón de Santa Fe in 2010.

== Titles ==
Season	Club	Title
Apertura 2005	Godoy Cruz	Primera B Nacional
2007	Arsenal de Sarandí	Copa Sudamericana
