= Alejandro Argüello =

Mexican footballer (born 1982)

Personal information
- Full name: Alejandro Argüello Roa
- Date of birth: 25 January 1982 (age 44)
- Place of birth: Mexico City, Mexico
- Height: 1.74 m (5 ft 9 in)
- Position: Midfielder

Senior career*
Years	Team	Apps	(Gls)
2004–2011	América	118	(4)
2006	→ Zacatepec (loan)	?	(?)
2010	→ Jaguares (loan)	25	(1)
2010	→ Tigres (loan)	1	(1)
2011	→ Puebla (loan)	1	(0)
2012	Correcaminos UAT	12	(1)
- * Club domestic league appearances and goals as of 30 May 2007 ‡ National team caps and goals as of 30 May 2007

Alejandro Argüello Roa (born 25 January 1982) is a Mexican former footballer, who last played for Correcaminos UAT.

== Career ==
Argüello began playing professional football with Club América, making his debut against Dorados de Sinaloa in the Apertura 2004 season. Argüello has made an impact in the 2008 InterLiga scoring 3 goals.

After spending most of his career playing for América, the club loaned him during 2010 for short spells to Tigres de la UANL and Puebla F.C.

== Honours ==
Club América

- Mexican Championship – Clausura 2005
- Mexican Championship – Campeón de Campeones 2004-2005
- 2006 CONCACAF Champions' Cup
