= 2012 Copa Sudamericana finals =

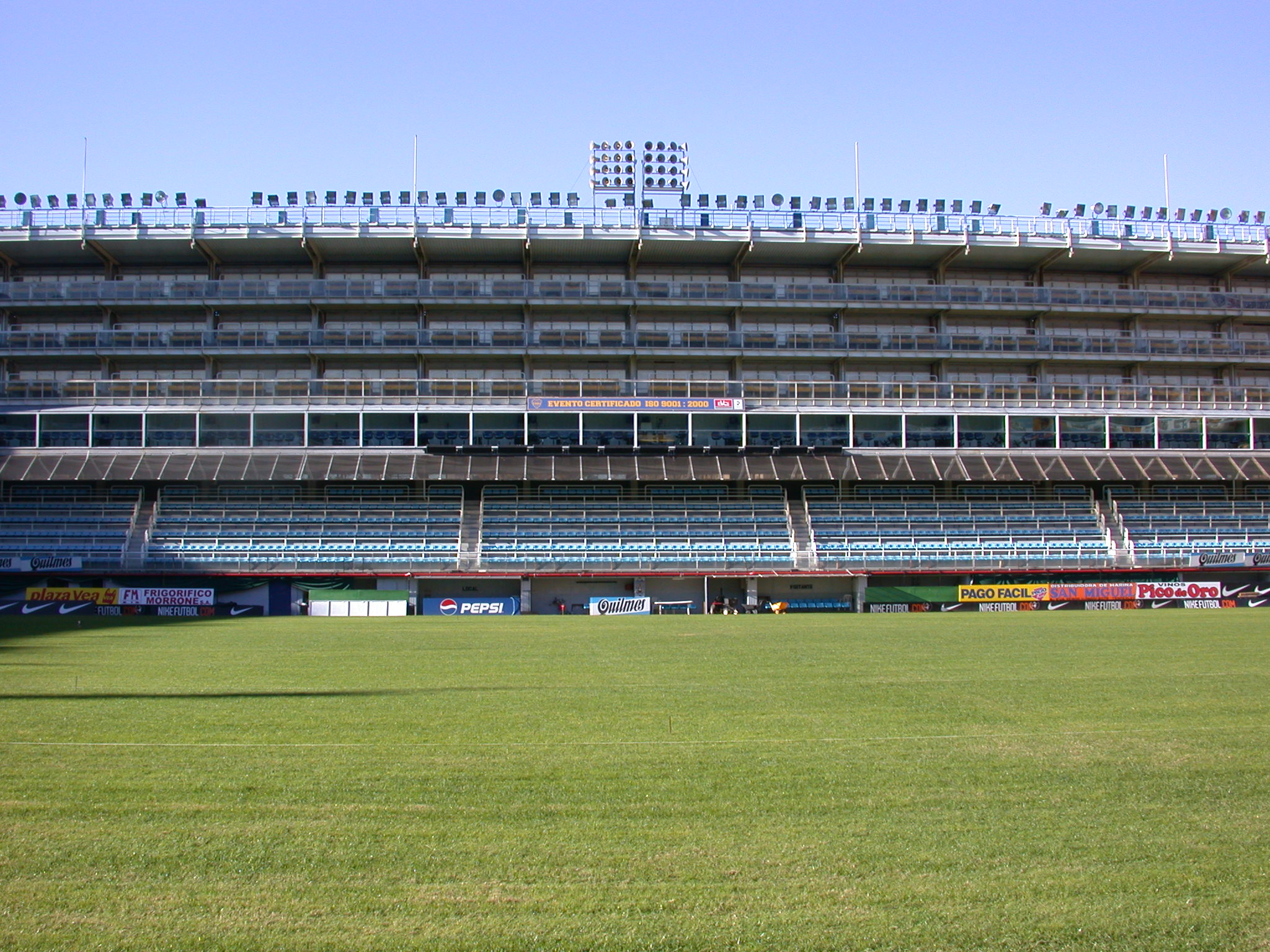
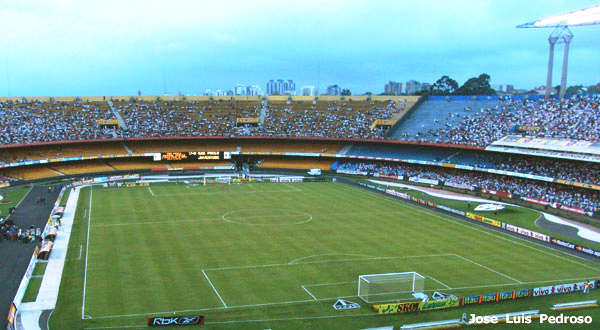
- Event: 2012 Copa Bridgestone Sudamericana de Clubes
Tigre	São Paulo
(Argentina)	(Brazil)
0	2
- on aggregate

First leg
Tigre	São Paulo
0	0
- Date: 5 December 2012
- Venue: Estadio Alberto J. Armando (La Bombonera), Buenos Aires
- Referee: Antonio Arias (Paraguay)

Second Leg
São Paulo	Tigre
2	0
- Abandoned at half time
- Date: 12 December 2012
- Venue: Estádio Cícero Pompeu de Toledo (Morumbi), São Paulo
- Referee: Enrique Osses (Chile)

The 2012 Copa Sudamericana finals were the final two-legged tie that decided the winner of the 2012 Copa Sudamericana, the 11th edition of the Copa Sudamericana, South America's secondary international club football tournament organized by CONMEBOL. The matches were played on 5 and 12 December 2012 between Tigre of Argentina and São Paulo of Brazil.

== Qualified teams ==
Team	Previous finals appearances (bold indicates winners)
(Argentina) Tigre	None
(Brazil) São Paulo	None

== Road to the finals ==
(Brazil) São Paulo			Round	(Argentina) Tigre		
Opponent	Venue	Score		Opponent	Venue	Score
Bye			First stage	Bye		
(Brazil) Bahia	Away	0–2	Second stage	(Argentina) Argentinos Juniors	Away	1–2
(Brazil) Bahia	Home	2–0	Second stage	(Argentina) Argentinos Juniors	Home	4–1
(Ecuador) LDU Loja	Away	1–1	Round of 16	(Ecuador) Deportivo Quito	Away	2–0
(Ecuador) LDU Loja	Home	0–0	Round of 16	(Ecuador) Deportivo Quito	Home	4–0
Universidad de Chile	Away	0–2	Quarter-finals	(Paraguay) Cerro Porteño	Away	1–0
Universidad de Chile	Home	5–0	Quarter-finals	(Paraguay) Cerro Porteño	Home	4–2
(Chile) Universidad Católica	Away	1–1	Semi-finals	(Colombia) Millonarios	Home	0–0
(Chile) Universidad Católica	Home	0–0	Semi-finals	(Colombia) Millonarios	Away	1–1

== Rules ==
The final is played over two legs; home and away. The higher seeded team plays the second leg at home. The team that accumulates the most points —three for a win, one for a draw, zero for a loss— after the two legs is crowned the champion. Should the two teams be tied on points after the second leg, the team with the best goal difference wins. If the two teams have equal goal difference, the away goals rule is not applied, unlike the rest of the tournament. Extra time is played, which consists of two 15-minute halves. If the tie is still not broken, a penalty shootout ensues according to the Laws of the Game.

== Matches ==
=== First leg ===
5 December 2012
20:50 UTC−3

Tigre (Argentina)	0–0	(Brazil) São Paulo
	Report

Estadio Alberto J. Armando (La Bombonera), Buenos Aires
Referee: Antonio Arias (Paraguay)

**Tigre**	**São Paulo**

GK	17	(Argentina) Damián Albil
DF	23	(Argentina) Norberto Paparatto	(yellow card) 84'
DF	21	(Argentina) Mariano Echeverría
DF	2	(Argentina) Alejandro Donatti	(red card) 15'
DF	22	(Argentina) Lucas Orban
MF	15	(Argentina) Ángel Gastón Díaz
MF	4	(Uruguay) Diego Ferreira
MF	8	(Argentina) Martín Galmarini (c)
MF	11	(Argentina) Ramiro Leone
MF	19	(Argentina) Rubén Botta	(yellow card) 71'	(substituted off) 87'
FW	9	(Argentina) Ezequiel Maggiolo		(substituted off) 77'
Substitutes:
GK	12	(Argentina) Agustín Cousillas
DF	13	(Argentina) Erik Godoy
MF	10	(Argentina) Matías Pérez García
MF	20	(Argentina) Matías Escobar
FW	7	(Argentina) Agustín Torassa		(substituted on) 87'
FW	16	(Argentina) Diego Ftacla		(substituted on) 77'
FW	6	(Argentina) Lucas Janson
Manager:
(Argentina) Néstor Gorosito

GK	1	(Brazil) Rogério Ceni (c)
DF	13	(Brazil) Paulo Miranda
DF	3	(Italy) Rafael Toloi	(yellow card) 53'
DF	4	(Brazil) Rhodolfo	(yellow card) 61'
DF	6	(Brazil) Cortez
MF	5	(Brazil) Wellington
MF	15	(Brazil) Denílson	(yellow card) 63'
MF	10	(Brazil) Jádson		(substituted off) 60'
FW	7	(Brazil) Lucas
FW	17	(Brazil) Osvaldo
FW	9	(Brazil) Luís Fabiano	(red card) 14'
Substitutes:
GK	22	(Brazil) Denis
DF	14	(Brazil) Edson Silva
DF	23	(Brazil) Douglas
MF	18	(Brazil) Maicon
MF	8	(Brazil) Ganso
MF	16	(Brazil) Cícero		(substituted on) 60'
FW	11	(Brazil) Ademilson
Manager:
(Brazil) Ney Franco

Assistant referees:
Rodney Aquino (Paraguay)
Dario Gaona (Paraguay)
Fourth official:
Enrique Caceres (Paraguay)

=== Second leg ===
12 December 2012
21:50 UTC−2

São Paulo (Brazil)	2–0	(Argentina) Tigre
Lucas 22'; Osvaldo 28'	Report

Estádio Cícero Pompeu de Toledo (Morumbi), São Paulo
Attendance: 67,042
Referee: Enrique Osses (Chile)

**São Paulo**	**Tigre**

GK	1	(Brazil) Rogério Ceni (c)	(yellow card) 38'
DF	13	(Brazil) Paulo Miranda	(red card) 45+2'
DF	3	(Italy) Rafael Toloi
DF	4	(Brazil) Rhodolfo
DF	6	(Brazil) Cortez
MF	5	(Brazil) Wellington
MF	15	(Brazil) Denílson	(yellow card) 32'
MF	10	(Brazil) Jádson
FW	7	(Brazil) Lucas
FW	17	(Brazil) Osvaldo	(yellow card) 45+2'
FW	19	(Brazil) Willian José
Substitutes:
GK	22	(Brazil) Denis
DF	14	(Brazil) Edson Silva
DF	23	(Brazil) Douglas
MF	18	(Brazil) Maicon
MF	8	(Brazil) Ganso
MF	16	(Brazil) Cícero
FW	11	(Brazil) Ademilson
Manager:
(Brazil) Ney Franco

GK	17	(Argentina) Damián Albil
DF	13	(Argentina) Erik Godoy	(yellow card) 42'
DF	23	(Argentina) Norberto Paparatto
DF	21	(Argentina) Mariano Echeverría
DF	22	(Argentina) Lucas Orban
MF	15	(Argentina) Ángel Gastón Díaz	(red card) 45+2'
MF	4	(Uruguay) Diego Ferreira
MF	8	(Argentina) Martín Galmarini (c)	(yellow card) 34'
MF	11	(Argentina) Ramiro Leone
MF	19	(Argentina) Rubén Botta
FW	9	(Argentina) Ezequiel Maggiolo
Substitutes:
GK	1	(Argentina) Javier García
MF	10	(Argentina) Matías Pérez García
MF	20	(Argentina) Matías Escobar
MF	3	(Argentina) Nicolás Martínez
FW	7	(Argentina) Agustín Torassa
FW	16	(Argentina) Diego Ftacla
FW	18	(Paraguay) Federico Santander
Manager:
(Argentina) Néstor Gorosito

Assistant referees:
Francisco Mondria (Chile)
Carlos Astroza (Chile)
Fourth official:
Julio Bascuñán (Chile)

== See also ==
- 2013 Recopa Sudamericana
- 2013 Suruga Bank Championship
