= 2007 Copa Sudamericana finals =

- Event: 2007 Copa Sudamericana
América	Arsenal
(Mexico)	(Argentina)
4	4
- on aggregate; Arsenal won on away goals

First leg
América	Arsenal
2	3
- Date: 30 November 2007
- Venue: Estadio Azteca, Mexico City
- Referee: Ricardo Grance (Paraguay)

Second leg
Arsenal	América
1	2
- Date: 5 December 2007
- Venue: El Cilindro, Avellaneda
- Referee: Óscar Ruiz (Colombia)

The 2007 Copa Sudamericana finals was a two-legged football match-up to determine the 2007 Copa Sudamericana champion. The final was contested by Argentine side Arsenal de Sarandí and Mexican Club América. The first leg was held in Estadio Azteca in Mexico City where Arsenal won 3–2. In the second leg, held at El Cilindro (home venue of Racing Club de Avellaneda), América won 2–1.

Despite both teams finished equaled on points (3–3 and 4–4 on aggregate), Arsenal won the competition on away goals rule, achieving their first international title.

== Qualified teams ==
Team	Previous finals app.
(Mexico) América	None
(Argentina) Arsenal	None

== Venues ==
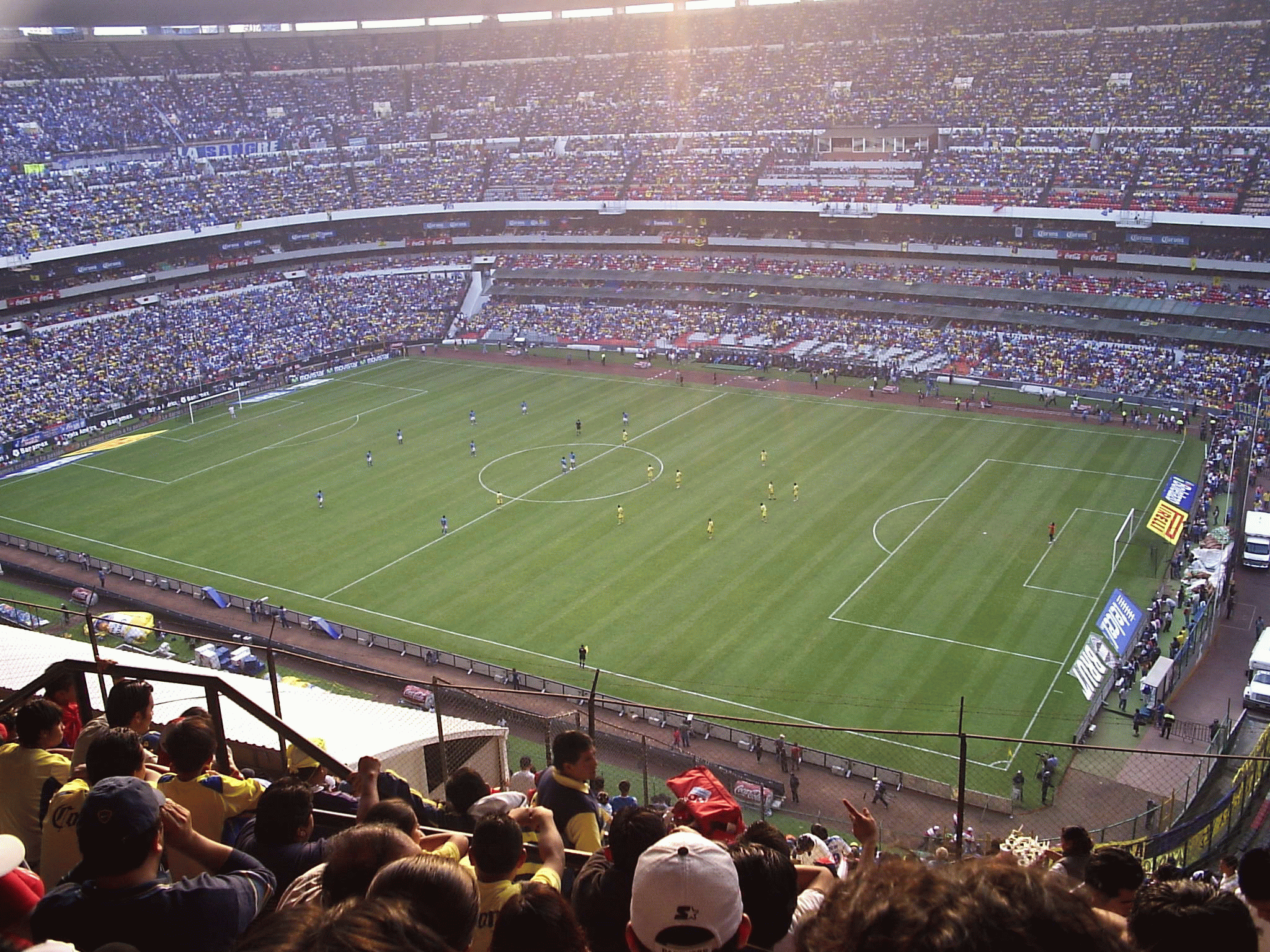
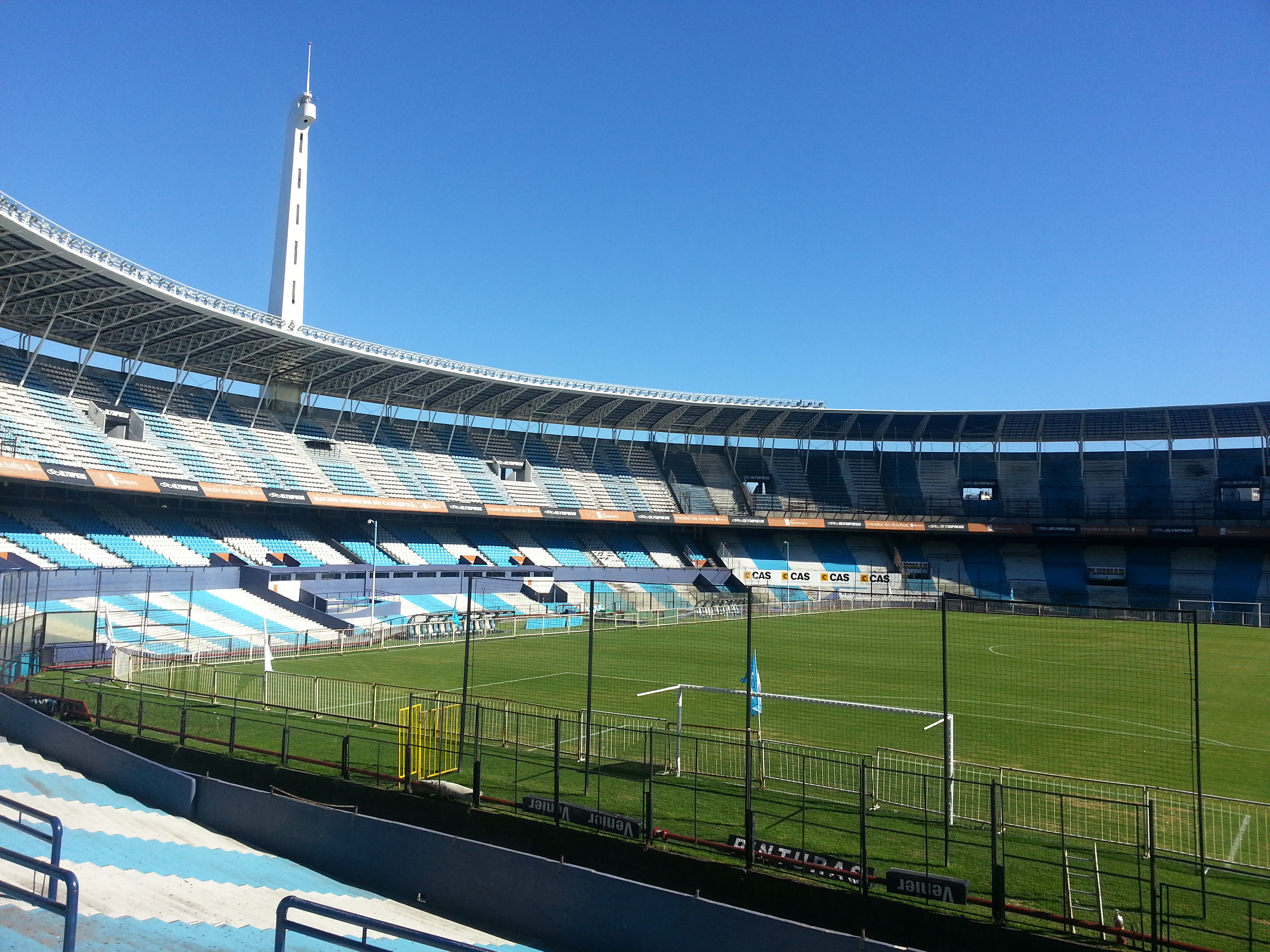
Estadio Azteca (left) and El Cilindro, venues for the series

== Match summary ==
=== First leg ===
2007 Copa Sudamericana finals
30 November 2007
19.15 (UTC-6)
First leg

América (Mexico)	2–3	(Argentina) Arsenal
Cabañas 6'; Argüello 55'	[ Report]	Matellán 32'; Gómez 57', 66'

Estadio Azteca, Mexico City
Referee: Ricardo Grance (Paraguay)

América	Arsenal

GK	1	(Mexico) Guillermo Ochoa
DF	3	(Mexico) José Antonio Castro	(yellow card) 32'
DF	4	(Mexico) Óscar Rojas
DF	5	(Mexico) Duilio Davino (c)
DF	16	(Chile) Ricardo F. Rojas
MF	20	(Mexico) Alejandro Argüello
MF	23	(Mexico) Juan Carlos Silva	(substituted off) 71'
MF	18	(Mexico) Germán Villa	(yellow card) 45'	(substituted off) 85'
MF	8	(Argentina) Federico Insúa
FW	17	(Uruguay) Hernán R. López
FW	9	(Paraguay) Salvador Cabañas
Substitutes:
MF	13	(Mexico) Juan Carlos Mosqueda	(substituted on) 71'
FW	21	(Mexico) Enrique Esqueda	(substituted on) 85'
Manager:
(Argentina) Daniel Brailovsky

GK	1	(Argentina) Mario Cuenca	(yellow card) 90'
DF	14	(Argentina) Javier Gandolfi	(yellow card) 76'
DF	21	(Colombia) Josimar Mosquera	(yellow card) 54'
DF	16	(Argentina) Aníbal Matellán
DF	18	(Argentina) Christian Díaz
MF	25	(Argentina) Diego Villar	(substituted off) 74'
MF	5	(Argentina) Andrés San Martín
MF	13	(Argentina) Carlos Casteglione (c)	(red card) 80'
MF	24	(Argentina) Javier Yacuzzi
FW	15	(Argentina) Alejandro Gómez	(substituted off) 82'
FW	7	(Argentina) José Luis Calderón	(substituted off) 86'
Substitutes:
MF	17	(Argentina) Pablo Garnier	(substituted on) 74'
MF	8	(Argentina) Israel Damonte	(substituted on) 82'
MF	20	(Argentina) Leonardo Biagini	(substituted on) 86'
Manager:
(Argentina) Gustavo Alfaro

Man of the Match:
(Argentina) Alejandro Gómez

Assistant referees:
(Paraguay) Manuel Bernal
(Paraguay) Tiburcio Gauto
Fourth official:
(Paraguay) Antonio Arias

=== Second leg ===
5 December 2007
21:30 (UTC-3)
Second leg

Arsenal (Argentina)	1–2	(Mexico) América
Andrizzi 83'		Díaz 18' (o.g.); Silva 62'

El Cilindro, Avellaneda
Referee: Óscar Ruiz (Colombia)

Arsenal	América

GK	1	(Argentina) Mario Cuenca
DF	14	(Argentina) Javier Gandolfi (c)
DF	21	(Colombia) Josimar Mosquera
DF	16	(Argentina) Aníbal Matellán
DF	18	(Argentina) Christian Díaz
MF	25	(Argentina) Diego Villar	(yellow card) 58'	(substituted off) 69'
MF	5	(Argentina) Andrés San Martín	(yellow card) 78'
MF	8	(Argentina) Israel Damonte	(substituted off) 86'
MF	24	(Argentina) Javier Yacuzzi	(yellow card) 60'	(substituted off) 65'
FW	15	(Argentina) Alejandro Gómez
FW	7	(Argentina) José Luis Calderón
Substitutes:
FW	20	(Argentina) Leonardo Biagini	(substituted on) 65'
MF	11	(Argentina) Martín Andrizzi	(substituted on) 69'
MF	10	(Argentina) Santiago Raymonda	(substituted on) 86'
Manager:
(Argentina) Gustavo Alfaro

GK	1	(Mexico) Guillermo Ochoa
DF	3	(Mexico) José A. Castro	(yellow card) 32'
DF	4	(Mexico) Óscar Rojas	(yellow card) 58'	(substituted off) 86'
DF	5	(Mexico) Duilio Davino (c)	(yellow card) 28'	(red card) 90'
DF	16	(Chile) Ricardo F. Rojas
MF	20	(Mexico) Alejandro Argüello
MF	23	(Mexico) Juan Carlos Silva	(yellow card) 63'
MF	18	(Mexico) Germán Villa	(yellow card) 36'
MF	8	(Argentina) Federico Insúa
FW	17	(Uruguay) Hernán R. López	(yellow card) 21'	(substituted off) 76'
FW	9	(Paraguay) Salvador Cabañas
Substitutes:
DF	2	(Mexico) Ismael Rodríguez	(substituted on) 76'
FW	7	(Argentina) Lucas Castromán	(substituted on) 86'	(red card) 90'
Manager:
(Argentina) Daniel Brailovsky

Man of the Match:
(Argentina) Martín Andrizzi

Assistant referees:
(Colombia) Abraham González
(Colombia) Eduardo Díaz
Fourth official:
(Colombia) José Buitrago
