= Agustín Cousillas =

Argentine footballer

Personal information
- Full name: Agustín Sebastián Cousillas
- Date of birth: 19 April 1990 (age 36)
- Place of birth: Roque Pérez, Argentina
- Height: 1.82 m (6 ft 0 in)
- Position: Goalkeeper

Team information
- Current team: Chacarita Juniors

Youth career
- Tigre

Senior career*
Years	Team	Apps	(Gls)
2011–2014	Tigre	1	(0)
2014–2015	Málaga B	11	(0)
2014–2015	Málaga	0	(0)
2016	Villa Teresa	11	(0)
2016–2017	La Calera	1	(0)
2017–2018	Rentistas	16	(0)
2018	Villa Teresa	0	(0)
2018–2019	Aurora	58	(0)
2020–	Chacarita Juniors	1	(0)
- * Club domestic league appearances and goals as of 19:08, 17 March 2021 (UTC)

Agustín Sebastián Cousillas (born 19 April 1990) is an Argentine footballer who plays for Chacarita Juniors as a goalkeeper.

== Club career ==
Born in Roque Pérez, Buenos Aires province, Cousillas graduated from local Tigre, and was promoted to the first team in 2011. However, he acted only as a backup to Daniel Islas and Javier García.

Islas subsequently left the club in the 2011 summer, but Cousillas remained behind García and new signing Damián Albil. On 2 December 2012 he played his first match as a professional, replacing Albil in a 0–1 loss at Belgrano. He was handed his first start on 6 March of the following year, in a 1–0 home win against Palmeiras for the year's Copa Libertadores.

On 27 June 2014 Cousillas moved abroad for the first time of his career, joining Málaga CF and being assigned to the reserves.

== Personal life ==
Cousillas' father, Rubén, was also a footballer and a goalkeeper.
