= 2006 Copa Sudamericana finals =

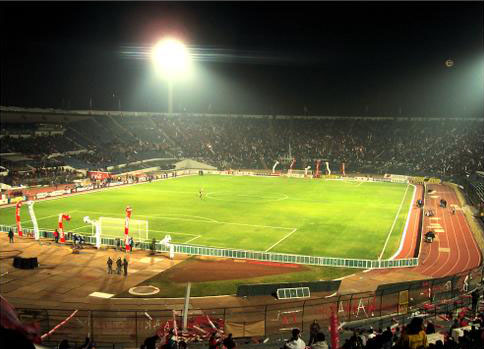
- Estadio Nacional de Chile, the host venue for the second leg of the finals.
- Event: 2006 Copa Nissan Sudamericana
Pachuca	Colo-Colo
(Mexico)	(Chile)
3	2
- on aggregate

First leg
Pachuca	Colo-Colo
1	1
- Date: 30 November 2006
- Venue: Estadio Hidalgo, Pachuca, Hidalgo
- Referee: Roberto Silvera

Second leg
Colo-Colo	Pachuca
1	2
- Date: 13 December 2006
- Venue: Estadio Nacional Julio Martínez Prádanos, Santiago
- Referee: Héctor Baldassi
- Attendance: 55,000

The 2006 Copa Sudamericana finals was a two-legged football contest, played in November and December 2006, to determine the champion of the 2006 Copa Sudamericana. The teams taking part were Chilean side Colo-Colo, and Mexican side Pachuca. The first leg, played in Pachuca, resulted in a 1–1 draw. The second leg, in Santiago, was won 2–1 by Pachuca, making them the cup winners for that year.

Despite being from Mexico –which is a member nation of CONCACAF and not CONMEBOL– Pachuca were eligible to compete in this tournament after winning the 2006 Mexican Primera División, earning them an invite from CONMEBOL and receiving an automatic berth directly to the knockout stages. Pachuca's victory in the final marked the first time in history that a representative of CONCACAF won a CONMEBOL-sanctioned tournament.

== Qualified teams ==
Team	Previous finals app.
(Chile) Colo-Colo	None
(Mexico) Pachuca	None

For the second time, a Mexican team, and the first time Pachuca qualified for the final. This was also the first time Colo-Colo qualified for the final. This marked the first time both teams faced each other since CONCACAF representatives started participating in the tournament since 2005.

This also marked the first time an Argentine team did not qualify to the Copa Sudamericana final, since the inaugural edition in 2002.

== Route to the final ==
Pachuca				Round	Colo-Colo			
Preliminary stages
Opponent	Agg.	1st leg	2nd leg		Opponent	Agg.	1st leg	2nd leg
Bye				First stage	(Chile) Huachipato	3–3 (p)	2–1 (A)	1–2 (H) (a.e.t.)
Bye				Second stage	(Peru) Coronel Bolognesi	2–2 (a)	1–2 (A)	1–0 (H)
Knockout stage
Opponent	Agg.	1st leg	2nd leg		Opponent	Agg.	1st leg	2nd leg
(Colombia) Deportes Tolima	6–3	1–2 (A)	5–1 (H)	Round of 16	(Costa Rica) Alajuelense	11–2	4–0 (A)	7–2 (H)
(Argentina) Lanús	5–2	3–0 (A)	2–2 (H)	Quarter-finals	(Argentina) Gimnasia de La Plata	6–1	4–1 (H)	2–0 (A)
(Brazil) Atlético Paranaense	5–1	1–0 (A)	4–1 (H)	Semi-finals	(Mexico) Toluca	4–1	2–1 (H)	2–0 (A)

== Format ==
The final was played on a home-and-away two-legged basis, with Colo-Colo hosting the second leg. The away goals rule was not applied, and extra time would be played if the aggregate score was tied after the second leg. If the aggregate score was still tied after extra time, a penalty shoot-out would have been used to determine the winner.

== Match details ==
=== First leg ===
29 November 2006
19:15 UTC−3
First leg

Pachuca (Mexico)	1–1	(Chile) Colo-Colo
Chitiva 24'	Report	Suazo 50'

Estadio Hidalgo, Pachuca
Attendance: 24,000
Referee: Roberto Silvera (Uruguay)

Pachuca
Colo-Colo

=== Second leg ===
13 December 2006
21:30 UTC−3
Second leg

Colo-Colo (Chile)	1–2	(Mexico) Pachuca
Suazo 35'	Report	Caballero 53'; Giménez 72'

Estadio Nacional, Santiago
Attendance: 55,000
Referee: Héctor Baldassi (Argentina)

Colo-Colo
Pachuca

GK	1	(Argentina) Sebastián Cejas
DF	5	(Chile) Miguel Riffo
DF	23	(Chile) Arturo Vidal	Yellow card
DF	4	(Chile) David Henríquez	Yellow card
DF	2	(Chile) Álvaro Ormeño	(substituted off) 79'
MF	19	(Chile) Rodrigo Meléndez	(yellow card) (substituted off) 86'
MF	17	(Chile) Arturo Sanhueza
MF	11	(Chile) Gonzalo Fierro	Red card
MF	14	(Chile) Matías Fernández
FW	16	(Chile) Humberto Suazo
FW	7	(Chile) Alexis Sánchez	(substituted off) 83'
Substitutions:
FW	9	(Chile) Mario Cáceres	(substituted on) 79'
MF	10	(Argentina) Miguel Caneo	(substituted on) 83'
DF	18	(Colombia) Andrés González	(substituted on) 86'
Manager:
(Argentina) Claudio Borghi

GK	1	(Colombia) Miguel Calero
DF	2	(Mexico) Leobardo López
DF	3	(Colombia) Aquivaldo Mosquera
DF	21	(Mexico) Fausto Pinto
DF	14	(Mexico) Marvin Cabrera
MF	13	(Mexico) Fernando Salazar	(substituted off) 46'
MF	6	(Mexico) Jaime Correa
MF	8	(Mexico) Gabriel Caballero
MF	10	(Colombia) Andrés Chitiva	Red card
FW	19	(Argentina) Christian Giménez	(yellow card) (substituted off) 83'
FW	11	(Mexico) Juan Carlos Cacho	(substituted off) 46'
Substitutions:
MF	7	(Argentina) Damián Álvarez	(substituted on) 46' (yellow card)
MF	16	(Mexico) Carlos G. Rodríguez	(substituted on) 46'
MF	23	(Mexico) Juan P. Alfaro	(substituted on) 83'
Manager:
(Mexico) Enrique Meza
