= 2012 Copa Sudamericana preliminary stages =

The preliminary stages of the 2012 Copa Bridgestone Sudamericana de Clubes consisted of two stages:

- First Stage (first legs: July 24–26, July 31–August 2; second legs: August 7–9, 14–16, 21, 23)
- Second Stage, divided into three sections:
  - Argentina (first legs: August 16, 22–23; second legs: August 29–30)
  - Brazil (first legs: July 31–August 1; second legs: August 21–23)
  - Rest of South America (first legs: August 28–30; second legs: September 18–20)

== Format ==
The draw was made in Luque on June 29, 2012. Thirty-two teams (all from rest of South America) competed in the First Stage, where they were drawn into sixteen ties. The sixteen winners of the First Stage joined another fourteen teams (six from Argentina, eight from Brazil) to compete in the Second Stage, where they were drawn into fifteen ties.

Teams played in two-legged ties on a home-away basis. Each team earned 3 points for a win, 1 point for a draw, and 0 points for a loss. The following criteria were used for breaking ties on points:

1. Goal difference
2. Away goals
3. Penalty shootout (no extra time is played)

The fifteen winners of the Second Stage advanced to the round of 16 to join the defending champion Universidad de Chile.

== First stage ==
Team 1 played the second leg at home.

| Team 1 | Agg. | Team 2 | 1st leg | 2nd leg |
South Zone
| Olimpia (Paraguay) | 2–1 | (Uruguay) Danubio | 0–0 | 2–1 |
| Nacional (Uruguay) | 4–2 | (Chile) Iquique | 0–2 | 4–0 |
| Universidad Católica (Chile) | 4–1 | (Bolivia) Blooming | 1–1 | 3–0 |
| Oriente Petrolero (Bolivia) | 2–2 (a) | (Paraguay) Guaraní | 1–0 | 1–2 |
| Universitario (Bolivia) | 1–5 | (Uruguay) Liverpool | 0–3 | 1–2 |
| Cerro Largo (Uruguay) | 1–2 | (Bolivia) Aurora | 1–2 | 0–0 |
| Cobreloa (Chile) | 3–2 | (Paraguay) Tacuary | 1–0 | 2–2 |
| Cerro Porteño (Paraguay) | 7–3 | (Chile) O'Higgins | 3–3 | 4–0 |
North Zone
| Millonarios (Colombia) | 3–0 | (Peru) Inti Gas | 0–0 | 3–0 |
| Universidad San Martín (Peru) | 1–2 | (Ecuador) Emelec | 0–1 | 1–1 |
| Mineros (Venezuela) | 3–1 | (Colombia) La Equidad | 1–0 | 2–1 |
| Barcelona (Ecuador) | 5–1 | (Venezuela) Deportivo Táchira | 0–0 | 5–1 |
| ACD Lara (Venezuela) | 1–3 | (Colombia) Deportes Tolima | 1–3 | 0–0 |
| León de Huánuco (Peru) | 2–4 | (Ecuador) Deportivo Quito | 0–1 | 2–3 |
| Envigado (Colombia) | 2–0 | (Peru) Unión Comercio | 0–0 | 2–0 |
| LDU Loja (Ecuador) | 6–2 | (Venezuela) Monagas | 2–0 | 4–2 |

=== Match G1 ===
July 24, 2012
19:15 UTC−03:00

| Danubio (Uruguay) | 0–0 | (Paraguay) Olimpia |
|---|---|---|
| | Report |

Estadio Luis Franzini, Montevideo
Referee: Sandro Ricci (Brazil)

August 7, 2012
20:45 UTC−04:00

| Olimpia (Paraguay) | 2–1 | (Uruguay) Danubio |
|---|---|---|
| Aranda 40'; Salgueiro 44' | Report | Carboni 22' |

Estadio Manuel Ferreira, Asunción
Referee: Diego Abal (Argentina)

Olimpia won on points 4–1.

=== Match G2 ===
July 31, 2012
18:00 UTC−04:00

| Iquique (Chile) | 2–0 | (Uruguay) Nacional |
|---|---|---|
| Ereros 40'; Dávila 60' | Report |

Estadio Tierra de Campeones, Iquique
Referee: Enrique Cáceres (Paraguay)

August 14, 2012
21:00 UTC−03:00

| Nacional (Uruguay) | 4–0 | (Chile) Iquique |
|---|---|---|
| Rolín 6'; Bueno 45+1'; Recoba 85'; Vecino 90+2' | Report |

Estadio Centenario, Montevideo
Referee: Paulo Oliveira (Brazil)

Tied on points 3–3, Nacional won on goal difference.

=== Match G3 ===
August 2, 2012
20:30 UTC−04:00

| Blooming (Bolivia) | 1–1 | (Chile) Universidad Católica |
|---|---|---|
| Méndez 60' | Report | Ramos 58' |

Estadio Ramón Tahuichi Aguilera, Santa Cruz
Referee: Julio Quintana (Paraguay)

August 9, 2012
21:15 UTC−04:00

| Universidad Católica (Chile) | 3–0 | (Bolivia) Blooming |
|---|---|---|
| Martínez 10'; Ríos 28' (pen.); González 72' | Report |

Estadio San Carlos de Apoquindo, Santiago
Referee: Sandro Ricci (Brazil)

Universidad Católica won on points 4–1.

=== Match G4 ===
July 26, 2012
18:15 UTC−04:00

| Guaraní (Paraguay) | 0–1 | (Bolivia) Oriente Petrolero |
|---|---|---|
| | Report | Carando 52' |

Estadio Rogelio Livieres, Asunción
Referee: Daniel Fedorczuk (Uruguay)

August 9, 2012
18:45 UTC−04:00

| Oriente Petrolero (Bolivia) | 1–2 | (Paraguay) Guaraní |
|---|---|---|
| Carando 56' | Report | Órteman 20'; López 73' |

Estadio Ramón Tahuichi Aguilera, Santa Cruz
Referee: Patricio Polic (Chile)

Tied on points 3–3, Guaraní won on away goals.

=== Match G5 ===
July 25, 2012
19:15 UTC−03:00

| Liverpool (Uruguay) | 3–0 | (Bolivia) Universitario de Sucre |
|---|---|---|
| Núñez 11', 21'; Pezzolano 18' (pen.) | Report |

Estadio Luis Franzini, Montevideo
Referee: Julio Bascuñán (Chile)

August 16, 2012
18:00 UTC−04:00

| Universitario de Sucre (Bolivia) | 1–2 | (Uruguay) Liverpool |
|---|---|---|
| Escalante 52' (pen.) | Report | Ferreira 70'; Scarone 73' |

Estadio Olímpico Patria, Sucre
Referee: Marlon Escalante (Venezuela)

Liverpool won in points 6–0.

=== Match G6 ===
July 26, 2012
20:30 UTC−04:00

| Aurora (Bolivia) | 2–1 | (Uruguay) Cerro Largo |
|---|---|---|
| Rodríguez 40'; Castellón 64' | Report | Barboza 83' |

Estadio Félix Capriles, Cochabamba
Referee: Ulises Mereles (Paraguay)

August 14, 2012
18:30 UTC−03:00

| Cerro Largo (Uruguay) | 0–0 | (Bolivia) Aurora |
|---|---|---|
| | Report |

Estadio Arquitecto Antonio Eleuterio Ubilla, Melo
Referee: Saúl Laverni (Argentina)

Aurora won in points 4–1.

=== Match G7 ===
July 24, 2012
20:30 UTC−04:00

| Tacuary (Paraguay) | 0–1 | (Chile) Cobreloa |
|---|---|---|
| | Report | Troncoso 77' |

Estadio Roberto Bettega, Asunción
Referee: Óscar Maldonado (Bolivia)

August 7, 2012
18:15 UTC−04:00

| Cobreloa (Chile) | 2–2 | (Paraguay) Tacuary |
|---|---|---|
| Canío 44'; Pol 55' | Report | Cardozo 62'; Suárez 70' (o.g.) |

Estadio Municipal de Calama, Calama
Referee: Líber Prudente (Uruguay)

Cobreloa won on points 4–1.

=== Match G8 ===
July 26, 2012
20:30 UTC−04:00

| O'Higgins (Chile) | 3–3 | (Paraguay) Cerro Porteño |
|---|---|---|
| Blanco 10', 90'; Fernández 78' | Report | Bonet 25'; Fabbro 71'; López 86' |

Estadio Parque El Teniente, Rancagua
Referee: Patricio Loustau (Argentina)

August 8, 2012
20:45 UTC−04:00

| Cerro Porteño (Paraguay) | 4–0 | (Chile) O'Higgins |
|---|---|---|
| Fabbro 14'; Oviedo 15'; S. Salcedo 73'; Da Silva 90' | Report |

Estadio General Pablo Rojas, Asunción
Referee: Martín Vázquez (Uruguay)

Cerro Porteño won on points 4–1.

=== Match G9 ===
August 2, 2012
14:15 UTC−05:00

| Inti Gas (Peru) | 0–0 | (Colombia) Millonarios |
|---|---|---|
| | Report |

Estadio Ciudad de Cumaná, Ayacucho
Referee: Omar Ponce (Ecuador)

August 14, 2012
21:30 UTC−05:00

| Millonarios (Colombia) | 3–0 | (Peru) Inti Gas |
|---|---|---|
| Cosme 35'; Rentería 71'; Otálvaro 89' | Report |

Estadio Nemesio Camacho "El Campín", Bogotá
Referee: Juan Soto (Venezuela)

Millonarios won on points 4–1.

=== Match G10 ===
July 31, 2012
19:15 UTC−05:00

| Emelec (Ecuador) | 1–0 | (Peru) Universidad San Martín |
|---|---|---|
| Mera 65' | Report |

Estadio George Capwell, Guayaquil
Referee: Pablo Lunati (Argentina)

August 21, 2012
21:30 UTC−05:00

| Universidad San Martín (Peru) | 1–1 | (Ecuador) Emelec |
|---|---|---|
| Labarthe 9' | Report | Gaibor 90+3' (pen.) |

Estadio Monumental "U", Lima
Referee: Patricio Polic (Chile)

Emelec won on points 4–1.

=== Match G11 ===
August 2, 2012
17:15 UTC−05:00

| La Equidad (Colombia) | 0–1 | (Venezuela) Mineros |
|---|---|---|
| | Report | Guerra 25' |

Estadio Nemesio Camacho "El Campín", Bogotá
Referee: Georges Buckley (Peru)

August 9, 2012
20:45 UTC−04:30

| Mineros (Venezuela) | 2–1 | (Colombia) La Equidad |
|---|---|---|
| Vallenilla 23'; Guerra 69' | Report | Valencia 1' |

Polideportivo Cachamay, Puerto Ordaz
Referee: Carlos Vera (Ecuador)

Mineros won on points 6–0.

=== Match G12 ===
July 25, 2012
20:00 UTC−04:30

| Deportivo Táchira (Venezuela) | 0–0 | (Ecuador) Barcelona |
|---|---|---|
| | Report |

Estadio Polideportivo de Pueblo Nuevo, San Cristóbal
Referee: Adrián Vélez (Colombia)

August 8, 2012
17:15 UTC−05:00

| Barcelona (Ecuador) | 5–1 | (Venezuela) Deportivo Táchira |
|---|---|---|
| Perlaza 14'; Quiñónez 32'; Oyola 43' (pen.); Matamoros 51'; De la Torre 64' | Report | González 80' (pen.) |

Estadio Monumental Isidro Romero Carbo, Guayaquil
Referee: Néstor Pitana (Argentina)

Barcelona won on points 4–1.

=== Match G13 ===
July 31, 2012
21:30 UTC−05:00

| Deportes Tolima (Colombia) | 3–1 | (Venezuela) ACD Lara |
|---|---|---|
| Ramírez 38'; Arrechea 40'; Preciado 65' | Report | Torrealba 53' |

Estadio Manuel Murillo Toro, Ibagué
Referee: Henry Gambetta (Peru)

August 16, 2012
20:00 UTC−04:30

| ACD Lara (Venezuela) | 0–0 | (Colombia) Deportes Tolima |
|---|---|---|
| | Report |

Estadio Metropolitano de Fútbol de Lara, Barquisimeto
Referee: Diego Lara (Ecuador)

Deportes Tolima won on points 4–1.

=== Match G14 ===
August 1, 2012
17:30 UTC−05:00

| Deportivo Quito (Ecuador) | 1–0 | (Peru) León de Huánuco |
|---|---|---|
| Cambindo 63' (o.g.) | Report |

Estadio Olímpico Atahualpa, Quito
Referee: José Buitrago (Colombia)

August 23, 2012
14:00 UTC−05:00

| León de Huánuco (Peru) | 2–3 | (Ecuador) Deportivo Quito |
|---|---|---|
| Vásquez 10'; Quina 45+1' | Report | Bevacqua 12', 64'; Saritama 25' (pen.) |

Estadio Heraclio Tapia, Huánuco
Referee: Antonio Arias (Paraguay)

Deportivo Quito won on points 6–0.

=== Match G15 ===
July 31, 2012
14:15 UTC−05:00

| Unión Comercio (Peru) | 0–0 | (Colombia) Envigado |
|---|---|---|
| | Report |

Estadio Aliardo Soria Pérez, Pucallpa
Referee: Diego Lara (Ecuador)

August 15, 2012
19:45 UTC−05:00

| Envigado (Colombia) | 2–0 | (Peru) Unión Comercio |
|---|---|---|
| Palacios 5'; Orozco 27' | Report |

Estadio Polideportivo Sur, Envigado
Referee: Raúl Orosco (Bolivia)

Envigado won on points 4–1.

=== Match G16 ===
August 2, 2012
20:00 UTC−04:30

| Monagas (Venezuela) | 0–2 | (Ecuador) LDU Loja |
|---|---|---|
| | Report | Fábio Renato 38' (pen.), 73' |

Estadio Monumental de Maturín, Maturín
Referee: Imer Machado (Colombia)

August 15, 2012
17:15 UTC−05:00

| LDU Loja (Ecuador) | 4–2 | (Venezuela) Monagas |
|---|---|---|
| Fábio Renato 6' (pen.), 60', 76'; Feraud 51' | Report | Cabezas 39'; Rentería 90' |

Estadio Federativo Reina del Cisne, Loja
Referee: Víctor Carrillo (Peru)

LDU Loja won on points 6–0.

== Second stage ==
| Team 1 | Agg. | Team 2 | 1st leg | 2nd leg |
|---|---|---|---|---|
| Guaraní (Paraguay) | 3–5 | (Colombia) Millonarios | 2–4 | 1–1 |
| Bahia (Brazil) | 0–4 | (Brazil) São Paulo | 0–2 | 0–2 |
| Envigado (Colombia) | 1–2 | (Uruguay) Liverpool | 1–1 | 0–1 |
| Argentinos Juniors (Argentina) | 2–6 | (Argentina) Tigre | 1–2 | 1–4 |
| Mineros (Venezuela) | 2–6 | (Paraguay) Cerro Porteño | 2–2 | 0–4 |
| Atlético Goianiense (Brazil) | 2–2 (4–2 p) | (Brazil) Figueirense | 1–1 | 1–1 |
| Olimpia (Paraguay) | 0–1 | (Ecuador) Emelec | 0–1 | 0–0 |
| Grêmio (Brazil) | 3–3 (a) | (Brazil) Coritiba | 1–0 | 2–3 |
| Cobreloa (Chile) | 3–4 | (Ecuador) Barcelona | 0–0 | 3–4 |
| Universidad Católica (Chile) | 3–3 (a) | (Colombia) Deportes Tolima | 2–0 | 1–3 |
| Colón (Argentina) | 5–2 | (Argentina) Racing | 3–1 | 2–1 |
| Deportivo Quito (Ecuador) | 5–2 | (Bolivia) Aurora | 2–1 | 3–1 |
| Boca Juniors (Argentina) | 3–3 (a) | (Argentina) Independiente | 3–3 | 0–0 |
| LDU Loja (Ecuador) | 2–2 (a) | (Uruguay) Nacional | 0–1 | 2–1 |
| Palmeiras (Brazil) | 3–3 (a) | (Brazil) Botafogo | 2–0 | 1–3 |

=== Match O1 ===
August 30, 2012
20:45 UTC−04:00

| Guaraní (Paraguay) | 2–4 | (Colombia) Millonarios |
|---|---|---|
| Hidalgo 72'; De La Cruz 88' | Report | Cosme 30', 59'; Rentería 52'; Robayo 85' |

Estadio Rogelio Livieres, Asunción
Referee: Raúl Orosco (Bolivia)

September 19, 2012
20:45 UTC−05:00

| Millonarios (Colombia) | 1–1 | (Paraguay) Guaraní |
|---|---|---|
| Vásquez 67' | Report | Hidalgo 46' |

Estadio Nemesio Camacho "El Campín", Bogotá
Referee: Omar Ponce (Ecuador)

Millonarios won on points 4–1.

=== Match O2 ===
August 1, 2012
21:50 UTC−03:00

| Bahia (Brazil) | 0–2 | (Brazil) São Paulo |
|---|---|---|
| | Report | Rogério Ceni 6'; Ademilson 68' |

Estádio Metropolitano Roberto Santos (Pituaçu), Salvador
Referee: Marcelo Henrique (Brazil)

August 21, 2012
21:15 UTC−03:00

| São Paulo (Brazil) | 2–0 | (Brazil) Bahia |
|---|---|---|
| Willian José 64'; Maicon 68' | Report |

Estádio Cícero Pompeu de Toledo (Morumbi), São Paulo
Attendance: 9,791
Referee: Sandro Ricci (Brazil)

São Paulo won on points 6–0.

=== Match O3 ===
August 28, 2012
19:45 UTC−05:00

| Envigado (Colombia) | 1–1 | (Uruguay) Liverpool |
|---|---|---|
| Mejía 21' | Report | Aguirre 86' |

Estadio Polideportivo Sur, Envigado
Referee: Juan Soto (Venezuela)

September 20, 2012
20:15 UTC−03:00

| Liverpool (Uruguay) | 1–0 | (Colombia) Envigado |
|---|---|---|
| Núñez 29' | Report |

Estadio Luis Franzini, Montevideo
Referee: Julio Quintana (Paraguay)

Note: Second leg postponed from September 19 due to bad weather.
Liverpool won on points 4–1.

=== Match O4 ===
August 16, 2012
21:40 UTC−03:00

| Argentinos Juniors (Argentina) | 1–2 | (Argentina) Tigre |
|---|---|---|
| Núñez 61' | Report | Ferreira 51', 90+1' |

Estadio Diego Armando Maradona, Buenos Aires
Referee: Patricio Loustau (Argentina)

August 30, 2012
19:15 UTC−03:00

| Tigre (Argentina) | 4–1 | (Argentina) Argentinos Juniors |
|---|---|---|
| Ftacla 34'; Díaz 45' (pen.); Pío 90'; Galmarini 90+3' | Report | Hernández 81' |

Estadio José Dellagiovanna, Victoria
Referee: Germán Delfino (Argentina)

Tigre won on points 6–0.

=== Match O5 ===
August 29, 2012
20:15 UTC−04:30

| Mineros (Venezuela) | 2–2 | (Paraguay) Cerro Porteño |
|---|---|---|
| Rojas 66' (pen.); Guerra 79' | Report | Fabbro 39'; Dos Santos 50' |

Polideportivo Cachamay, Puerto Ordaz
Referee: José Buitrago (Colombia)

September 19, 2012
21:45 UTC−04:00

| Cerro Porteño (Paraguay) | 4–0 | (Venezuela) Mineros |
|---|---|---|
| Benítez 32'; S. Salcedo 46'; Fabbro 77'; Nanni 90' | Report |

Estadio General Pablo Rojas, Asunción
Referee: Heber Lopes (Brazil)

Cerro Porteño won on points 4–1.

=== Match O6 ===
August 1, 2012
19:30 UTC−03:00

| Atlético Goianiense (Brazil) | 1–1 | (Brazil) Figueirense |
|---|---|---|
| Márcio 37' (pen.) | Report | Abreu 68' |

Estádio do Governo do Estado de Goiás (Serra Dourada), Goiânia
Referee: Péricles Cortez (Brazil)

August 23, 2012
19:30 UTC−03:00

| Figueirense (Brazil) | 1–1 | (Brazil) Atlético Goianiense |
|---|---|---|
| Túlio 36' | Report | Gustavo 58' |
Penalties
| Túlio (penalty scored); Fernandes (penalty missed); Caio (penalty scored); João Paulo (penalty missed) | 2–4 | (penalty missed) Marcos; (penalty scored) Dodô; (penalty scored) Ernandes; (penalty scored) Márcio; (penalty scored) Patric |

Estádio Orlando Scarpelli, Florianópolis
Referee: Marcelo Henrique (Brazil)

Tied on points 2–2, Atlético Goianiense won on penalties.

=== Match O7 ===
August 28, 2012
20:45 UTC−04:00

| Olimpia (Paraguay) | 0–1 | (Ecuador) Emelec |
|---|---|---|
| | Report | Nasuti 40' |

Estadio Manuel Ferreira, Asunción
Referee: Leandro Vuaden (Brazil)

September 18, 2012
20:45 UTC−05:00

| Emelec (Ecuador) | 0–0 | (Paraguay) Olimpia |
|---|---|---|
| | Report |

Estadio George Capwell, Guayaquil
Referee: Néstor Pitana (Argentina)

Emelec won on points 4–1.

=== Match O8 ===
July 31, 2012
21:15 UTC−03:00

| Grêmio (Brazil) | 1–0 | (Brazil) Coritiba |
|---|---|---|
| André Lima 71' | Report |

Estádio Olímpico Monumental, Porto Alegre
Referee: Ricardo Marques (Brazil)

August 22, 2012
19:30 UTC−03:00

| Coritiba (Brazil) | 3–2 | (Brazil) Grêmio |
|---|---|---|
| Éverton Ribeiro 22'; Roberto 52'; Pereira 66' | Report | Elano 40' (pen.); Moreno 90' |

Estádio Major Antônio Couto Pereira, Curitiba
Referee: Wilson Seneme (Brazil)

Tied on points 3–3, Grêmio won on away goals.

=== Match O9 ===
August 28, 2012
18:15 UTC−04:00

| Cobreloa (Chile) | 0–0 | (Ecuador) Barcelona |
|---|---|---|
| | Report |

Estadio Municipal de Calama, Calama
Referee: Julio Quintana (Paraguay)

September 19, 2012
18:15 UTC−05:00

| Barcelona (Ecuador) | 4–3 | (Chile) Cobreloa |
|---|---|---|
| Arroyo 6', 23'; Campos 17'; Díaz 73' | Report | Díaz 8'; Abarca 40'; Troncoso 55' |

Estadio Monumental Isidro Romero Carbo, Guayaquil
Referee: Martín Vázquez (Uruguay)

Barcelona won on points 4–1.

=== Match O11 ===
August 29, 2012
20:45 UTC−04:00

| Universidad Católica (Chile) | 2–0 | (Colombia) Deportes Tolima |
|---|---|---|
| Trecco 35'; Ríos 66' | Report |

Estadio San Carlos de Apoquindo, Santiago
Referee: Líber Prudente (Uruguay)

September 18, 2012
20:45 UTC−05:00

| Deportes Tolima (Colombia) | 3–1 | (Chile) Universidad Católica |
|---|---|---|
| Noguera 32'; Vallejo 42'; Ramírez 48' | Report | Costa 53' |

Estadio Manuel Murillo Toro, Ibagué
Referee: Víctor Rivera (Peru)

Tied on points 3–3, Universidad Católica won on away goals.

=== Match O12 ===
August 23, 2012
21:50 UTC−03:00

| Colón (Argentina) | 3–1 | (Argentina) Racing |
|---|---|---|
| Mugni 46'; Curuchet 58'; Graciani 89' | Report | Hauche 49' |

Estadio Brigadier General Estanislao López, Santa Fe
Referee: Pablo Lunati (Argentina)

August 30, 2012
21:45 UTC−03:00

| Racing (Argentina) | 1–2 | (Argentina) Colón |
|---|---|---|
| Cámpora 3' | Report | Gigliotti 65'; Moreno y Fabianesi 73' |

Estadio Presidente Juan Domingo Perón, Avellaneda
Referee: Sergio Pezzotta (Argentina)

Colón won on points 6–0.

=== Match O13 ===
August 30, 2012
17:15 UTC−05:00

| Deportivo Quito (Ecuador) | 2–1 | (Bolivia) Aurora |
|---|---|---|
| Checa 37'; Lorca 38' | Report | Da Silva 60' |

Estadio Olímpico Atahualpa, Quito
Referee: Julio Bascuñán (Chile)

September 18, 2012
19:15 UTC−04:00

| Aurora (Bolivia) | 1–3 | (Ecuador) Deportivo Quito |
|---|---|---|
| Olmedo 64' | Report | Bevacqua 14', 59'; Checa 35' |

Estadio Félix Capriles, Cochabamba
Referee: Ricardo Marques (Brazil)

Deportivo Quito won on points 6–0.

=== Match O14 ===
August 22, 2012
19:30 UTC−03:00

| Boca Juniors (Argentina) | 3–3 | (Argentina) Independiente |
|---|---|---|
| Silva 15'; Somoza 45'; Sánchez Miño 76' | Report | Santana 44'; Rosales 48'; Farías 90' (pen.) |

Estadio Alberto J. Armando (La Bombonera), Buenos Aires
Referee: Patricio Loustau (Argentina)

August 29, 2012
19:15 UTC−03:00

| Independiente (Argentina) | 0–0 | (Argentina) Boca Juniors |
|---|---|---|
| | Report |

Estadio Libertadores de América, Avellaneda
Referee: Néstor Pitana (Argentina)

Tied on points 2–2, Independiente won on away goals.

=== Match O15 ===
August 29, 2012
17:15 UTC−05:00

| LDU Loja (Ecuador) | 0–1 | (Uruguay) Nacional |
|---|---|---|
| | Report | Taborda 16' |

Estadio Federativo Reina del Cisne, Loja
Referee: Georges Buckley (Peru)

September 18, 2012
20:15 UTC−03:00

| Nacional (Uruguay) | 1–2 | (Ecuador) LDU Loja |
|---|---|---|
| Luna 23' | Report | Uchuari 21'; Calderón 78' |

Estadio Centenario, Montevideo
Referee: Patricio Polic (Chile)

Tied on points 3–3, LDU Loja won on away goals.

=== Match O16 ===
August 1, 2012
21:50 UTC−03:00

| Palmeiras (Brazil) | 2–0 | (Brazil) Botafogo |
|---|---|---|
| Barcos 46', 65' | Report |

Arena Barueri, Barueri
Referee: Heber Lopes (Brazil)

August 22, 2012
22:00 UTC−03:00

| Botafogo (Brazil) | 3–1 | (Brazil) Palmeiras |
|---|---|---|
| Seedorf 34'; Renato 56'; Lodeiro 73' | Report | Patrik 43' |

Estádio Olímpico João Havelange (Engenhão), Rio de Janeiro
Referee: Leandro Vuaden (Brazil)

Tied on points 3–3, Palmeiras won on away goals.
