= 2012 Copa Sudamericana final stages =

The final stages of the 2012 Copa Bridgestone Sudamericana de Clubes consisted of four stages:

- Round of 16 (first legs: September 25–27, October 2–3; second legs: October 23–25)
- Quarterfinals (first legs: October 30–November 1; second legs: November 7–8, 15)
- Semifinals (first legs: November 22; second legs: November 28–29)
- Finals (first leg: December 5; second leg: December 12)

== Format ==
The defending champion, Universidad de Chile, and the fifteen winners of the second stage (three from Argentina, four from Brazil, eight from rest of South America) qualified for the final stages. The sixteen teams played a single-elimination tournament, and were seeded depending on which second stage tie they won (i.e., the winner of Match O1 would be assigned the 1 seed, etc.; Universidad de Chile were assigned the 10 seed). In each stage, teams played in two-legged ties on a home-away basis, with the higher-seeded team playing the second leg at home. Each team earned 3 points for a win, 1 point for a draw, and 0 points for a loss. The following criteria were used for breaking ties on points, except for the final:

1. Goal difference
2. Away goals
3. Penalty shootout (no extra time is played)

For the final, the first tiebreaker was goal difference. If the teams are tied on goal difference, the away goals rule would not be applied, and 30 minutes of extra time would be played. If still had tied after extra time, the title would be decided by penalty shootout.

If two teams from the same association reach the semifinals, they would be forced to play each other.

== Bracket ==
In each tie, the higher-seeded team played the second leg at home.

Round of 16
1	(Colombia) Millonarios	1	3
16	(Brazil) Palmeiras	3	0
8	(Brazil) Grêmio	1	2
9	(Ecuador) Barcelona	0	1
4	(Argentina) Tigre	0	4
13	(Ecuador) Deportivo Quito	2	0
5	(Paraguay) Cerro Porteño	2	2
12	(Argentina) Colón	1	1
2	(Brazil) São Paulo (a)	1	0
15	(Ecuador) LDU Loja	1	0
7	(Ecuador) Emelec	2	0
10	U. de Chile	2	1
3	(Uruguay) Liverpool	1	1
14	(Argentina) Independiente	2	2
6	(Brazil) Atlético Goianiense	0	3
11	(Chile) U. Católica (a)	2	1

Quarterfinals
1	(Colombia) Millonarios	0	3
8	(Brazil) Grêmio	1	1
4	(Argentina) Tigre	0	4
5	(Paraguay) Cerro Porteño	1	2
2	(Brazil) São Paulo	2	5
10	U. de Chile	0	0
14	(Argentina) Independiente	2	1
11	(Chile) U. Católica	2	2

Semifinals
1	(Colombia) Millonarios	0	1
4	(Argentina) Tigre (a)	0	1
2	(Brazil) São Paulo (a)	1	0
11	(Chile) U. Católica	1	0

Finals
4	(Argentina) Tigre	0	0
2	(Brazil) São Paulo	0	2

== Round of 16 ==
Team 1	Agg.	Team 2	1st leg	2nd leg
Millonarios (Colombia)	4–3	(Brazil) Palmeiras	1–3	3–0
São Paulo (Brazil)	1–1 (a)	(Ecuador) LDU Loja	1–1	0–0
Liverpool (Uruguay)	2–4	(Argentina) Independiente	1–2	1–2
Tigre (Argentina)	4–2	(Ecuador) Deportivo Quito	0–2	4–0
Cerro Porteño (Paraguay)	4–2	(Argentina) Colón	2–1	2–1
Atlético Goianiense (Brazil)	3–3 (a)	(Chile) Universidad Católica	0–2	3–1
Emelec (Ecuador)	2–3	Universidad de Chile	2–2	0–1
Grêmio (Brazil)	3–1	(Ecuador) Barcelona	1–0	2–1

=== Match A ===
October 2, 2012
21:45 UTC−03:00

Palmeiras (Brazil)	3–1	(Colombia) Millonarios
Obina 12'; Tiago Real 53'; Luan 87'	Report	Artur 84' (o.g.)

Estádio Municipal Paulo Machado de Carvalho (Pacaembu), São Paulo
Referee: Patricio Loustau (Argentina)

October 23, 2012
19:45 UTC−05:00

Millonarios (Colombia)	3–0	(Brazil) Palmeiras
Ortiz 34'; Rentería 60' (pen.); Ochoa 76'	Report

Estadio Nemesio Camacho "El Campín", Bogotá
Referee: Víctor Carrillo (Peru)

Tied on points 3–3, Millonarios won on goal difference.

=== Match B ===
September 26, 2012
20:00 UTC−05:00

LDU Loja (Ecuador)	1–1	(Brazil) São Paulo
Larrea 43'	Report	Bermúdez 36' (o.g.)

Estadio Federativo Reina del Cisne, Loja
Referee: Julio Bascuñán (Chile)

October 24, 2012
22:00 UTC−02:00

São Paulo (Brazil)	0–0	(Ecuador) LDU Loja
	Report

Estádio Cícero Pompeu de Toledo (Morumbi), São Paulo
Referee: Julio Quintana (Paraguay)

Tied on points 2–2, São Paulo won on away goals.

=== Match C ===
September 25, 2012
21:30 UTC−03:00

Independiente (Argentina)	2–1	(Uruguay) Liverpool
Vargas 6'; Rosales 49'	Report	Núñez 85'

Estadio Libertadores de América, Avellaneda
Referee: José Buitrago (Colombia)

October 25, 2012
20:15 UTC−02:00

Liverpool (Uruguay)	1–2	(Argentina) Independiente
Núñez 43'	Report	Mancuello 48'; Battión 90+1'

Estadio Centenario, Montevideo
Referee: Carlos Vera (Ecuador)

Independiente won on points 6–0.

=== Match D ===
September 25, 2012
17:15 UTC−05:00

Deportivo Quito (Ecuador)	2–0	(Argentina) Tigre
Lorca 52'; Vila 85'	Report

Estadio Olímpico Atahualpa, Quito
Referee: Adrián Vélez (Colombia)

October 25, 2012
21:45 UTC−03:00

Tigre (Argentina)	4–0	(Ecuador) Deportivo Quito
Maggiolo 10'; Díaz 77' (pen.); Donatti 85'; Botta 88'	Report

Estadio José Dellagiovanna, Victoria
Referee: Sandro Ricci (Brazil)

Tied on points 3–3, Tigre won on goal difference.

=== Match E ===
September 27, 2012
21:15 UTC−03:00

Colón (Argentina)	1–2	(Paraguay) Cerro Porteño
Mugni 45'	Report	Benítez 20'; Nanni 85'

Estadio Brigadier General Estanislao López, Santa Fe
Referee: Sandro Ricci (Brazil)

October 23, 2012
19:15 UTC−03:00

Cerro Porteño (Paraguay)	2–1	(Argentina) Colón
Nanni 11'; Dos Santos 69'	Report	Gigliotti 1'

Estadio General Pablo Rojas, Asunción
Referee: Darío Ubriaco (Uruguay)

Cerro Porteño won on points 6–0.

=== Match F ===
October 3, 2012
20:15 UTC−03:00

Universidad Católica (Chile)	2–0	(Brazil) Atlético Goianiense
Silva 54'; Ramos 86'	Report

Estadio San Carlos de Apoquindo, Santiago
Referee: Enrique Cáceres (Paraguay)

October 24, 2012
19:30 UTC−02:00

Atlético Goianiense (Brazil)	3–1	(Chile) Universidad Católica
Joílson 13'; Reniê 35'; Márcio 49' (pen.)	Report	Ríos 42'

Estádio do Governo do Estado de Goiás (Serra Dourada), Goiânia
Referee: Carlos Amarilla (Paraguay)

Tied on points 3–3, Universidad Católica won on away goals.

=== Match G ===
October 2, 2012
19:15 UTC−03:00

Universidad de Chile	2–2	(Ecuador) Emelec
Gutiérrez 18'; Ubilla 46'	Report	Figueroa 16'; De Jesús 41'

Estadio Nacional Julio Martínez Prádanos, Santiago
Referee: Marcelo Henrique (Brazil)

October 25, 2012
19:45 UTC−05:00

Emelec (Ecuador)	0–1	Universidad de Chile
	Report	Gutiérrez 57'

Estadio George Capwell, Guayaquil
Referee: Saúl Laverni (Argentina)

Universidad de Chile won on points 4–1.

=== Match H ===
September 26, 2012
20:00 UTC−05:00

Barcelona (Ecuador)	0–1	(Brazil) Grêmio
	Report	Werley 44'

Estadio Monumental Isidro Romero Carbo, Guayaquil
Referee: Georges Buckley (Peru)

October 24, 2012
22:00 UTC−02:00

Grêmio (Brazil)	2–1	(Ecuador) Barcelona
Perlaza 66' (o.g.); Zé Roberto 90+1'	Report	Mina 54'

Estádio Olímpico Monumental, Porto Alegre
Referee: Patricio Loustau (Argentina)

Grêmio won on points 6–0.

== Quarterfinals ==
Team 1	Agg.	Team 2	1st leg	2nd leg
Millonarios (Colombia)	3–2	(Brazil) Grêmio	0–1	3–1
São Paulo (Brazil)	7–0	Universidad de Chile	2–0	5–0
Universidad Católica (Chile)	4–3	(Argentina) Independiente	2–2	2–1
Tigre (Argentina)	4–3	(Paraguay) Cerro Porteño	0–1	4–2

=== Match S1 ===
October 30, 2012
21:50 UTC−02:00

Grêmio (Brazil)	1–0	(Colombia) Millonarios
Marco Antônio 36'	Report

Estádio Olímpico Monumental, Porto Alegre
Referee: Julio Bascuñán (Chile)

November 15, 2012
19:15 UTC−05:00

Millonarios (Colombia)	3–1	(Brazil) Grêmio
Cosme 60'; Rentería 80', 90+3' (pen.)	Report	Werley 12'

Estadio Nemesio Camacho "El Campín", Bogotá
Referee: Carlos Vera (Ecuador)

Tied on points 3–3, Millonarios won on goal difference.

=== Match S2 ===
October 31, 2012
20:50 UTC−03:00

Universidad de Chile	0–2	(Brazil) São Paulo
	Report	Willian José 8', 18'

Estadio Nacional Julio Martínez Prádanos, Santiago
Referee: Martín Vázquez (Uruguay)

November 7, 2012
21:50 UTC−02:00

São Paulo (Brazil)	5–0	Universidad de Chile
Jádson 4', 76'; Lucas 21'; Luís Fabiano 28'; Toloi 64'	Report

Estádio Municipal Paulo Machado de Carvalho (Pacaembu), São Paulo
Attendance: 32,934
Referee: Enrique Cáceres (Paraguay)

São Paulo won on points 6–0.

=== Match S3 ===
November 1, 2012
21:45 UTC−03:00

Independiente (Argentina)	2–2	(Chile) Universidad Católica
Tula 44'; Martínez 55' (o.g.)	Report	Andía 2'; Castillo 70'

Estadio Libertadores de América, Avellaneda
Referee: Leandro Vuaden (Brazil)

November 8, 2012
19:15 UTC−03:00

Universidad Católica (Chile)	2–1	(Argentina) Independiente
Ríos 16' (pen.), 38' (pen.)	Report	Santana 35'

Estadio San Carlos de Apoquindo, Santiago
Referee: Víctor Hugo Carrillo (Peru)

Universidad Católica won on points 4–1.

=== Match S4 ===
November 1, 2012
19:15 UTC−03:00

Cerro Porteño (Paraguay)	1–0	(Argentina) Tigre
Nanni 1'	Report

Estadio General Pablo Rojas, Asunción
Referee: José Buitrago (Colombia)

November 8, 2012
21:45 UTC−03:00

Tigre (Argentina)	4–2	(Paraguay) Cerro Porteño
Echeverría 18'; Botta 45+1'; Santander 50'; Donatti 74'	Report	S. Salcedo 61'; Fabbro 70'

Estadio José Dellagiovanna, Victoria
Referee: Martín Vázquez (Uruguay)

Tied on points 3–3, Tigre won on goal difference.

== Semifinals ==
Team 1	Agg.	Team 2	1st leg	2nd leg
Millonarios (Colombia)	1–1 (a)	(Argentina) Tigre	0–0	1–1
São Paulo (Brazil)	1–1 (a)	(Chile) Universidad Católica	1–1	0–0

=== Match F1 ===
November 22, 2012
21:45 UTC−03:00

Tigre (Argentina)	0–0	(Colombia) Millonarios
	Report

Estadio José Dellagiovanna, Victoria
Referee: Enrique Cáceres (Paraguay)

November 29, 2012
19:15 UTC−05:00

Millonarios (Colombia)	1–1	(Argentina) Tigre
Perlaza 90'	Report	Echeverría 65'

Estadio Nemesio Camacho "El Campín", Bogotá
Referee: Darío Ubriaco (Uruguay)

Tied on points 2–2, Tigre won on away goals.

=== Match F2 ===
November 22, 2012
19:15 UTC−03:00

Universidad Católica (Chile)	1–1	(Brazil) São Paulo
Castillo 69'	Report	Toloi 21'

Estadio San Carlos de Apoquindo, Santiago
Referee: Omar Ponce (Ecuador)

November 28, 2012
21:50 UTC−02:00

São Paulo (Brazil)	0–0	(Chile) Universidad Católica
	Report

Estádio Cícero Pompeu de Toledo (Morumbi), São Paulo
Attendance: 55,286
Referee: Juan Soto (Venezuela)

Tied on points 2–2, São Paulo won on away goals.

== Finals ==
The Finals were played over two legs, with the higher-seeded team playing the second leg at home. If the teams were tied on points and goal difference at the end of regulation in the second leg, the away goals rule would not be applied and 30 minutes of extra time would be played. If still tied after extra time, the title would be decided by penalty shootout.

December 5, 2012
20:50 UTC−03:00

Tigre (Argentina)	0–0	(Brazil) São Paulo
	Report

Estadio Alberto J. Armando (La Bombonera), Buenos Aires
Referee: Antonio Arias (Paraguay)

December 12, 2012
21:50 UTC−02:00

São Paulo (Brazil)	2–0	(Argentina) Tigre
Lucas 22'; Osvaldo 28'	Report

Estádio Cícero Pompeu de Toledo (Morumbi), São Paulo
Referee: Enrique Osses (Chile)

The second leg was abandoned after 45 minutes by the referee, as the Tigre players refused to come back to play the rest of the match after incidents at halftime. Therefore, São Paulo were declared as the champion.

São Paulo won on points 4–1.
