= September 2012 in sports =

<<	September 2012					>>
Su	Mo	Tu	We	Th	Fr	Sa
						1
2	3	4	5	6	7	8
9	10	11	12	13	14	15
16	17	18	19	20	21	22
23	24	25	26	27	28	29
30
Sports

This list shows notable sports-related deaths, events, and notable outcomes that occurred in September of 2012.

== Days of the month ==
=== 30 September 2012 (Sunday) ===
==== Auto racing ====
- Sprint Cup Series – Chase for the Sprint Cup:
  - AAA 400 in Dover, Delaware: (1) (Michigan) Brad Keselowski (Dodge; Penske Racing) (2) (California) Jeff Gordon (Chevrolet; Hendrick Motorsports) (3) (Arkansas) Mark Martin (Toyota; Michael Waltrip Racing)
    - Drivers' championship standings (after 29 of 36 races): (1) Keselowski 2142 points (2) (California) Jimmie Johnson (Chevrolet; Hendrick Motorsports) 2137 (3) (Florida) Denny Hamlin (Toyota; Joe Gibbs Racing) 2126

==== Baseball ====
- Major League Baseball:
  - In Arlington, Texas: Los Angeles Angels of Anaheim 5, Texas Rangers 4.
    - Angels outfielder Mike Trout becomes the youngest player in MLB history to collect 30 home runs and 30 stolen bases in a single season at the age of 21 years, 54 days.
  - In Pittsburgh, Pennsylvania: Cincinnati Reds 4, Pittsburgh Pirates 3.
    - Pirates extend their MLB record for most consecutive losing season to 20 as they rack up their 82nd loss of the season.

==== Basketball ====
- WNBA playoffs:
  - Conference Semifinals:
    - Eastern Conference Game 2 in Atlanta, Georgia: Indiana Fever 103, Atlanta Dream 88. Series tied 1–1.
    - Western Conference Game 2 in Seattle, Washington: Seattle Storm 86, Minnesota Lynx 79. Series tied 1–1.

==== Rugby league ====
- NRL Grand Final in Sydney: Canterbury-Bankstown Bulldogs 4–11 **Melbourne Storm**
  - Storm win the title for the first time since 1999 and second time overall. Storm halfback Cooper Cronk is awarded Clive Churchill Medal as Man of the Match.

=== 29 September 2012 (Saturday) ===
==== Australian rules football ====
- AFL Grand Final in Melbourne: Hawthorn 11.15 (81) – 14.7 (91) **Sydney**
  - Sydney win the title for the first time since 2005 and fifth time overall.

==== Basketball ====
- WNBA playoffs:
  - Conference Semifinals:
    - Eastern Conference Game 2 in Newark, New Jersey: Connecticut Sun 75, New York Liberty 62. **Sun win series 2–0.**
    - Western Conference Game 2 in San Antonio, Texas: Los Angeles Sparks 101, San Antonio Silver Stars 94. **Sparks win series 2–0.**

==== Mixed martial arts ====
- UFC on Fuel TV: Struve vs. Miocic in Nottingham, England (ENG unless stated):
  - Welterweight bout: **Che Mills** def. Duane Ludwig (USA) via TKO (knee injury)
  - Welterweight bout: **John Hathaway** def. John Maguire via unanimous decision (30–27, 30–27, 30–27)
  - Lightweight bout: **Matt Wiman** (USA) def. Paul Sass via submission (armbar)
  - Bantamweight bout: **Brad Pickett** def. Yves Jabouin (HAI) via KO (punches)
  - Welterweight bout: **Dan Hardy** def. Amir Sadollah (USA) via unanimous decision (29–28, 29–28, 30–27)
  - Heavyweight bout: **Stefan Struve** (NED) def. Stipe Miocic (USA) via TKO (punches)

==== Rugby union ====
- The Rugby Championship, Round 5:
  - In Pretoria, South Africa: South Africa 31–8 Australia
  - In La Plata, Argentina: Argentina 15–54 New Zealand
    - Standings: New Zealand 21 points, South Africa 12, Australia 8, Argentina 3.
      - New Zealand win the inaugural Rugby Championship title.

=== 28 September 2012 (Friday) ===
==== Baseball ====
- Major League Baseball:
  - In Pittsburgh, Pennsylvania: Cincinnati Reds 1, Pittsburgh Pirates 0.
    - Reds pitcher Homer Bailey throws the 15th no–hitter in franchise history; the first since Tom Browning pitched a perfect game on September 16, 1988.

==== Basketball ====
- WNBA playoffs:
  - Conference Semifinals:
    - Eastern Conference Game 1 in Indianapolis, Indiana: Atlanta Dream 75, Indiana Fever 66. Dream lead series 1–0.
    - Western Conference Game 1 in Minneapolis, Minnesota: Minnesota Lynx 78, Seattle Storm 70. Lynx lead series 1–0.

=== 27 September 2012 (Thursday) ===
==== Basketball ====
- WNBA playoffs:
  - Conference Semifinals:
    - Eastern Conference Game 1 in Uncasville, Connecticut: Connecticut Sun 65, New York Liberty 60. Sun lead series 1–0.
    - Western Conference Game 1 in Los Angeles, California: Los Angeles Sparks 93, San Antonio Silver Stars 86. Sparks lead series 1–0.

==== Football (soccer) ====
- UEFA Women's Champions League Round of 32, first leg:
  - Unia Racibórz (Poland) – (Germany) Wolfsburg
  - SFK 2000 (Bosnia and Herzegovina) – (Czech Republic) 67-0 Sparta Praha
  - MTK (Hungary) – (Sweden) LdB Malmö
  - ADO Den Haag (Netherlands) – (Russia) Rossiyanka
- Copa Sudamericana Round of 16, first leg: Colón (Argentina) – (Paraguay) Cerro Porteño

=== 26 September 2012 (Wednesday) ===
==== Football (soccer) ====
- FIFA U-17 Women's World Cup Group Stage, matchday 2:
  - Group C:
    - Mexico 0–3 Brazil
    - New Zealand 0–3 Japan
  - Group D:
    - Uruguay 0–5 Ghana
    - China 1–1 Germany
- UEFA Women's Champions League Round of 32, first leg:
  - BIIK Kazygurt (Kazakhstan) 0–4 (Norway) Røa
  - Birmingham City (England) 2–0 (Italy) Bardolino Verona
  - Spartak Subotica (Serbia) 0–1 (Sweden) Göteborg
  - Apollon Limassol (Cyprus) 2–3 (Italy) Torres
  - PK-35 Vantaa (Finland) 0–7 (France) Lyon
  - Olimpia Cluj (Romania) 1–1 (Austria) Neulengbach
  - Barcelona (Spain) 0–3 (England) Arsenal
  - Stabæk (Norway) 2–0 (Denmark) Brøndby
  - Standard Liège (Belgium) 1–3 (Germany) Turbine Potsdam
  - Glasgow City (Scotland) 1–2 (Denmark) Fortuna Hjørring
  - Stjarnan (Iceland) 0–0 (Russia) Zorky Krasnogorsk
- Copa Sudamericana Round of 16, first leg:
  - LDU Loja (Ecuador) 1–1 (Brazil) São Paulo
  - Barcelona (Ecuador) 0–1 (Brazil) Grêmio

=== 25 September 2012 (Tuesday) ===
==== Football (soccer) ====
- FIFA U-17 Women's World Cup Group Stage, matchday 2:
  - Group A:
    - Colombia 0–1 Canada
    - Azerbaijan 0–11 Nigeria
  - Group B:
    - France 1–1 North Korea
    - United States 6–0 Gambia
- UEFA Women's Champions League Round of 32, first leg: Zürich (Switzerland) 1–1 (France) Juvisy
- Copa Sudamericana Round of 16, first leg:
  - Independiente (Argentina) 2–1 (Uruguay) Liverpool
  - Deportivo Quito (Ecuador) 2–0 (Argentina) Tigre

=== 24 September 2012 (Monday) ===
==== Baseball ====
- World Baseball Classic Qualifier 2 Final in Regensburg, Germany: Canada 11, Germany 1 (F/8). **Canada qualifies for the main tournament in March 2013.**

=== 23 September 2012 (Sunday) ===
==== Auto racing ====
- Formula One:
  - Singapore Grand Prix in Marina Bay, Singapore: (1) Sebastian Vettel (GER) (Red Bull-Renault) (2) Jenson Button (GBR) (McLaren-Mercedes) (3) Fernando Alonso (ESP) (Ferrari)
    - Drivers' championship standings (after 14 of 20 races): (1) Alonso 194 points (2) Vettel 165 (3) Kimi Räikkönen (FIN) (Lotus-Renault) 149
    - Constructors' championship standings: (1) Red Bull-Renault 297 points (2) McLaren-Mercedes 261 (3) Ferrari 245
- Sprint Cup Series – Chase for the Sprint Cup:
  - Sylvania 300 in Loudon, New Hampshire: (1) (Florida) Denny Hamlin (Toyota; Joe Gibbs Racing) (2) (California) Jimmie Johnson (Chevrolet; Hendrick Motorsports) (3) (California) Jeff Gordon (Chevrolet; Hendrick Motorsports)
    - Drivers' championship standings (after 28 of 36 races): (1) Johnson 2096 points (2) (Michigan) Brad Keselowski (Dodge; Penske Racing) 2095 (3) Hamlin 2089

==== Baseball ====
- World Baseball Classic qualification:
  - Qualifier 1 Final in Jupiter, Florida, United States: Spain 9, Israel 7 (F/10). **Spain qualifies for the main tournament in March 2013.**
  - Qualifier 2 in Regensburg, Germany: Germany 16, Great Britain 1 (F/7). Great Britain is eliminated.

==== Cycling ====
- UCI Road World Championships:
  - Men's road race: (gold) Philippe Gilbert (BEL) (silver) Edvald Boasson Hagen (NOR) (bronze) Alejandro Valverde (ESP)

==== Football (soccer) ====
- FIFA U-17 Women's World Cup Group Stage, matchday 1:
  - Group C:
    - Mexico 1–0 New Zealand
    - Brazil 0–5 Japan
  - Group D:
    - Uruguay 0–4 China
    - Ghana 1–2 Germany

==== Gaelic football ====
- All-Ireland Senior Championship Final in Dublin: **Donegal** 2–11 – 0–13 Mayo
  - Donegal win the title for the first time since 1992 and second time overall.

==== Sumo ====
- Aki basho (September grand tournament) in Tokyo, Japan:
  - Harumafuji Kōhei defeats Hakuhō Shō to win his 4th makuuchi (top division) championship with second consecutive perfect 15–0 record, and guarantees himself promotion to 70th yokozuna.

=== 22 September 2012 (Saturday) ===
==== Baseball ====
- World Baseball Classic qualification:
  - Qualifier 1 in Jupiter, Florida, United States:
    - South Africa 5, France 2 (F/11). France is eliminated.
    - Spain 13, South Africa 3. South Africa is eliminated.
  - Qualifier 2 in Regensburg, Germany:
    - Great Britain 12, Czech Republic 5. Czech Republic is eliminated.
    - Canada 16, Germany 7.
- Major League Baseball:
  - In Cincinnati, Ohio: Cincinnati Reds 6, Los Angeles Dodgers 0.
    - The Reds clinch the National League Central title for the first time since 2010 and third time overall, and advance to the Division Series.
  - In San Francisco, California: San Francisco Giants 8, San Diego Padres 4.
    - The Giants clinch the National League West title for the first time since 2010 and eighth time overall, and advance to the Division Series.

==== Cycling ====
- UCI Road World Championships:
  - Women's road race: (gold) Marianne Vos (NED) (silver) Rachel Neylan (AUS) (bronze) Elisa Longo Borghini (ITA)

==== Football (soccer) ====
- FIFA U-17 Women's World Cup Group Stage, matchday 1:
  - Group A:
    - Nigeria 1–1 Canada
    - Azerbaijan 0–4 Colombia
  - Group B:
    - North Korea 11–0 Gambia
    - France 0–0 United States

==== Mixed martial arts ====
- UFC 152 in Toronto, Ontario, Canada (USA unless stated):
  - Catchweight (146.2 lb) bout: **Cub Swanson** def. Charles Oliveira (BRA) via KO (punch)
  - Light Heavyweight bout: **Matt Hamill** def. Roger Hollett (CAN) via unanimous decision (29–28, 30–27, 30–27)
  - Middleweight bout: **Michael Bisping** (ENG) def. Brian Stann via unanimous decision (29–28, 29–28, 29–28)
  - Inaugural Flyweight Championship bout: **Demetrious Johnson** def. Joseph Benavidez via split decision (48–47, 47–48, 49–46)
  - Light Heavyweight Championship bout: **Jon Jones** (c) def. Vitor Belfort (BRA) via submission (keylock)

=== 21 September 2012 (Friday) ===
==== Baseball ====
- World Baseball Classic qualification:
  - Qualifier 1 in Jupiter, Florida, United States:
    - Israel 4, Spain 2.
    - South Africa vs. France — game suspended with the score tied at 2–2 after 9 innings due to rain; will be resumed on 22 September.
  - Qualifier 2 in Regensburg, Germany: Germany 16, Czech Republic 1 (F/6).
- Nippon Professional Baseball:
  - In Bunkyo, Tokyo: Yomiuri Giants 6, Tokyo Yakult Swallows 4.
    - The Giants win their first Central League title since 2009, and earn a one-win and home field advantage for Climax Series Final Stage.

=== 20 September 2012 (Wednesday) ===
==== Baseball ====
- World Baseball Classic qualification:
  - Qualifier 1 in Jupiter, Florida, United States: Spain 8, France 0.
  - Qualifier 2 in Regensburg, Germany: Canada 11, Great Britain 1 (F/7).

==== Football (soccer) ====
- CONCACAF Champions League Group Stage, matchday 4:
  - Group 3: Houston Dynamo (United States) 4–0 (El Salvador) FAS
  - Group 7: Municipal (Guatemala) 2–1 (Panama) Chorrillo
- Copa Sudamericana Second Stage, second leg (first leg scores in parentheses):
  - **Liverpool** (Uruguay) 1–0 (1–1) (Colombia) Envigado. Liverpool won on points 4–1
- UEFA Europa League group stage, matchday 1:
  - Group A:
    - Young Boys (Switzerland) 3–5 (England) Liverpool
    - Udinese (Italy) 1–1 (Russia) Anzhi Makhachkala
  - Group B:
    - Hapoel Tel Aviv (Israel) 0–3 (Spain) Atlético Madrid
    - Viktoria Plzeň (Czech Republic) 3–1 (Portugal) Académica
  - Group C:
    - AEL Limassol (Cyprus) 0–0 (Germany) Borussia Mönchengladbach
    - Fenerbahçe (Turkey) 2–2 (France) Marseille
  - Group D:
    - Marítimo (Portugal) 0–0 (England) Newcastle United
    - Bordeaux (France) 4–0 (Belgium) Club Brugge
  - Group E:
    - Stuttgart (Germany) 2–2 (Romania) Steaua București
    - Copenhagen (Denmark) 2–1 (Norway) Molde
  - Group F:
    - Dnipro Dnipropetrovsk (Ukraine) 2–0 (Netherlands) PSV Eindhoven
    - Napoli (Italy) 4–0 (Sweden) AIK
  - Group G:
    - Genk (Belgium) 3–0 (Hungary) Videoton
    - Sporting CP (Portugal) 0–0 (Switzerland) Basel
  - Group H:
    - Internazionale (Italy) 2–2 (Russia) Rubin Kazan
    - Partizan (Serbia) 0–0 (Azerbaijan) Neftchi Baku
  - Group I:
    - Lyon (France) 2–1 (Czech Republic) Sparta Prague
    - Athletic Bilbao (Spain) 1–1 (Israel) Ironi Kiryat Shmona
  - Group J:
    - Maribor (Slovenia) 3–0 (Greece) Panathinaikos
    - Tottenham Hotspur (England) 0–0 (Italy) Lazio
  - Group K:
    - Rapid Wien (Austria) 1–2 (Norway) Rosenborg
    - Bayer Leverkusen (Germany) 0–0 (Ukraine) Metalist Kharkiv
  - Group L:
    - Levante (Spain) 1–0 (Sweden) Helsingborg
    - Twente (Netherlands) 2–2 (Germany) Hannover 96

=== 19 September 2012 (Wednesday) ===
==== Baseball ====
- World Baseball Classic Qualifier 1 in Jupiter, Florida, United States: Israel 7, South Africa 3.

==== Cycling ====
- UCI Road World Championships:
  - Men's time trial: (gold) Tony Martin (GER) 58' 38.76" (silver) Taylor Phinney (USA) + 5.37" (bronze) Vasil Kiryienka (BLR) + 1' 44.99"

==== Football (soccer) ====
- AFC Champions League Quarter-finals, first leg:
  - Adelaide United (Australia) 2–2 (Uzbekistan) Bunyodkor
  - Ulsan Hyundai (South Korea) 1–0 (Saudi Arabia) Al-Hilal
  - Sepahan (Iran) 0–0 (Saudi Arabia) Al-Ahli
  - Al-Ittihad (Saudi Arabia) 4–2 (China) Guangzhou Evergrande
- CONCACAF Champions League Group Stage, matchday 4:
  - Group 1: Águila (El Salvador) 0–4 (Mexico) Santos Laguna
  - Group 4: Marathón (Honduras) 2–3 (United States) Seattle Sounders FC
  - Group 5: Puerto Rico Islanders 0–0 (United States) Los Angeles Galaxy
- Copa Sudamericana Second Stage, second leg (first leg scores in parentheses):
  - **Millonarios** (Colombia) 1–1 (4–2) (Paraguay) Guaraní. Millonarios won on points 4–1
  - **Cerro Porteño** (Paraguay) 4–0 (2–2) (Venezuela) Mineros de Guayana. Cerro Porteño won on points 4–1
  - **Barcelona** (Ecuador) 4–3 (0–0) (Chile) Cobreloa. Barcelona won on points 4–1
- UEFA Champions League group stage, matchday 1:
  - Group E:
    - Shakhtar Donetsk (Ukraine) 2–0 (Denmark) Nordsjælland
    - Chelsea (England) 2–2 (Italy) Juventus
  - Group F:
    - Lille (France) 1–3 (Belarus) BATE Borisov
    - Bayern Munich (Germany) 2–1 (Spain) Valencia
  - Group G:
    - Barcelona (Spain) 3–2 (Russia) Spartak Moscow
    - Celtic (Scotland) 0–0 (Portugal) Benfica
  - Group H:
    - Manchester United (England) 1–0 (Turkey) Galatasaray
    - Braga (Portugal) 0–2 (Romania) CFR Cluj
- UEFA Women's Euro 2013 qualifying, final matchday (teams **in bold** qualify for the Euro 2013, teams in italics advance to the playoff round):
  - Group 1:
    - Greece 0–0 **Italy**
    - Bosnia and Herzegovina 1–0 North Macedonia
    - Russia 1–1 Poland
      - Final standings: Italy 28, Russia 22, Poland 17, Bosnia and Herzegovina 10, Greece 5, Macedonia 2
  - Group 2:
    - Kazakhstan 1–0 Switzerland
    - **Germany** 10–0 Turkey
    - Spain 0–0 Romania
      - Final standings: Germany 28 points, Spain 20, Romania 16, Switzerland 15, Kazakhstan 7, Turkey 1
  - Group 3:
    - Hungary 9–0 Bulgaria
    - Northern Ireland 0–2 Belgium
    - **Norway** 2–1 Iceland
      - Final standings: Norway 24, Iceland 22, Belgium 20, Northern Ireland 11, Hungary 10, Bulgaria 0
  - Group 4:
    - Israel 0–2 Republic of Ireland
    - Scotland 0–5 **France**
      - Final standings: France 24, Scotland 16, Wales 10, Republic of Ireland 9, Israel 0
  - Group 5:
    - Belarus 1–0 Slovakia
    - **Finland** 0–1 Ukraine
      - Final standings: Finland 19 points, Ukraine 16, Belarus 13, Slovakia 10, Estonia 0
  - Group 6:
    - Serbia 3–0 Slovenia
    - **England** 3–0 Croatia
      - Final standings: England 20 points, **Netherlands** 19, Serbia 13, Slovenia 4, Croatia 1
  - Group 7:
    - Armenia 0–2 Czech Republic
    - **Denmark** 2–0 Portugal
      - Final standings: Denmark 21 points, Austria 19, Czech Republic 13, Portugal 6, Armenia 0

=== 18 September 2012 (Tuesday) ===
==== Cycling ====
- UCI Road World Championships:
  - Women's time trial: (gold) Judith Arndt (GER) (silver) Evelyn Stevens (USA) (bronze) Linda Villumsen (NZL)

==== Football (soccer) ====
- CONCACAF Champions League Group Stage, matchday 4:
  - Group 2: Tauro (Panama) 0–1 (United States) Real Salt Lake
  - Group 6: Real Estelí (Nicaragua) 1–1 (Mexico) UANL
  - Group 8: Xelajú (Guatemala) 3–2 (Trinidad and Tobago) W Connection
- Copa Sudamericana Second Stage, second leg (first leg scores in parentheses):
  - **Emelec** (Ecuador) 0–0 (1–0) (Paraguay) Olimpia. Emelec won on points 4–1
  - Deportes Tolima (Colombia) 3–1 (0–2) (Chile) **Universidad Católica**. Tied on points 3–3, Universidad Católica won on away goals
  - Aurora (Bolivia) 1–3 (1–2) (Ecuador) **Deportivo Quito**. Deportivo Quito won on points 6–0
  - Nacional (Uruguay) 1–2 (1–0) (Ecuador) **LDU Loja**. Tied on points 3–3, LDU Loja won on away goals
- UEFA Champions League group stage, matchday 1:
  - Group A:
    - Dinamo Zagreb (Croatia) 0–2 (Portugal) Porto
    - Paris Saint-Germain (France) 4–1 (Ukraine) Dynamo Kyiv
  - Group B:
    - Montpellier (France) 1–2 (England) Arsenal
    - Olympiacos (Greece) 1–2 (Germany) Schalke 04
  - Group C:
    - Málaga (Spain) 3–0 (Russia) Zenit St. Petersburg
    - Milan (Italy) 0–0 (Belgium) Anderlecht
  - Group D:
    - Borussia Dortmund (Germany) 1–0 (Netherlands) Ajax
    - Real Madrid (Spain) 3–2 (England) Manchester City

=== 16 September 2012 (Sunday) ===
==== Auto racing ====
- World Rally Championship:
  - Wales Rally GB: (1) Jari-Matti Latvala (FIN) (Ford Fiesta RS WRC) (2) Sébastien Loeb (FRA) (Citroën DS3 WRC) (3) Petter Solberg (NOR) (Ford Fiesta RS WRC)
    - Driver's standings (after 10 of 13 races): (1) Loeb 219 points, (2) Mikko Hirvonen (FIN) (Citroën DS3 WRC) 158, (3) Solberg 119.
- Sprint Cup Series – Chase for the Sprint Cup:
  - GEICO 400 in Joliet, Illinois: (1) (Michigan) Brad Keselowski (Dodge; Penske Racing) (2) (California) Jimmie Johnson (Chevrolet; Hendrick Motorsports) (3) (Washington (state)) Kasey Kahne (Chevrolet; Hendrick Motorsports)
    - Drivers' championship standings (after 27 of 36 races): (1) Keselowski 2056 points (2) Johnson 2053 (3) (Indiana) Tony Stewart (Chevrolet; Stewart–Haas Racing) 2048

==== Football (soccer) ====
- CAF Champions League group stage, final matchday (teams **in bold** advance to semifinals):
  - Group B:
    - Berekum Chelsea (Ghana) 1–0 (Democratic Republic of the Congo) **TP Mazembe**
    - **Al-Ahly** (Egypt) 1–1 (Egypt) Zamalek
      - Final standings: Al-Ahly 11 points, TP Mazembe 10, Berekum Chelsea 9, Zamalek 2.

==== Tennis ====
- Davis Cup World Group, Semifinals, day 3:
  - **Spain** 3–1 United States
    - **David Ferrer** (ESP) def. John Isner (USA) 6–7^{(2–7)}, 6–3, 6–4, 6–2
  - Argentina 2–3 **Czech Republic**
    - **Tomáš Berdych** (CZE) def. Carlos Berlocq (ARG) 6–3, 6–3, 6–4
    - **Juan Mónaco** (ARG) def. Ivo Minář (CZE) 6–3, 7–6^{(7–2)}
- Davis Cup World Group play-offs, day 3:
  - **Kazakhstan** 3–1 Uzbekistan
    - **Mikhail Kukushkin** (KAZ) def. Denis Istomin (UZB) 6–4, 6–2, 6–7^{(7-4)}, 6–2
  - **Germany** 3–2 Australia
    - **Florian Mayer** (GER) def. Bernard Tomic (AUS) 6–4, 6–2, 6–3
    - **Cedrik-Marcel Stebe** (GER) def. Lleyton Hewitt (AUS) 6–4, 6–1, 6–4
  - Japan 2–3 **Israel**
    - **Kei Nishikori** (JPN) def. Dudi Sela (ISR) 6–3, 3–6, 4–6, 6–4, 7–5
    - **Amir Weintraub** (ISR) def. Go Soeda (JPN) 6–3, 7–6^{(7–5)}, 4–6, 6–3
  - **Belgium** 5–0 Sweden
    - **David Goffin** (BEL) def. Markus Eriksson (SWE) 6–3, 6–4
    - **Steve Darcis** (BEL) def. Andreas Vinciguerra (SWE) 6–4, 6–2
  - **Canada** 4–1 South Africa
    - **Milos Raonic** (CAN) def. Izak van der Merwe (RSA) 6–2, 6–2, 6–4
    - **Frank Dancevic** (CAN) def. Nikala Scholtz (RSA) 6–2, 6–2
  - **Brazil** 5–0 Russia
    - **Thomaz Bellucci** (BRA) def. Alex Bogomolov, Jr. (RUS) 7–6^{(7–4)}, 6–3
    - **Rogério Dutra da Silva** (BRA) def. Stanislav Vovk (RUS) 6–2, 6–2
  - **Italy** 4–1 Chile
    - **Andreas Seppi** (ITA) def. Paul Capdeville (CHI) 6–3, 6–1, 6–3
    - **Simone Bolelli** (ITA) def. Christian Garín (CHI) 6–4, 6–3
  - Netherlands 2–3 **Switzerland**
    - **Roger Federer** (SWI) def. Robin Haase (NED) 6–1, 6–4, 6–4
    - **Thiemo de Bakker** (NED) def. Marco Chiudinelli (SWI) 6–2, 7–6^{(7–4)}
- WTA Tour:
  - Tashkent Open in Tashkent, Uzbekistan:
    - Final: **Irina-Camelia Begu** (ROU) def. Donna Vekić (CRO) 6–4, 6–4
      - Begu wins her first WTA title.
  - Bell Challenge in Quebec City, Canada:
    - Final: **Kirsten Flipkens** (BEL) def. Lucie Hradecká (CZE) 6–1, 7–5
      - Flipkens wins her first WTA title.

=== 15 September 2012 (Saturday) ===
==== Roller hockey ====
- European Championship in Paredes, Portugal, final matchday:
  - Germany 3–4 France
  - Switzerland 1–4 Italy
  - Portugal 4–5 Spain
    - Final standings: Spain 18 points, Portugal 15, Italy 12, France 9, Switzerland 6, Germany 3, England 0.
      - Spain win their 7th European title in a row and the 16th overall.

==== Rugby union ====
- The Rugby Championship, Round 4:
  - In Dunedin, New Zealand: New Zealand 21–11 South Africa
  - In Gold Coast, Australia: Australia 23–19 Argentina
    - Standings: New Zealand 16 points, Australia 8, South Africa 7, Argentina 3.

==== Tennis ====
- Davis Cup World Group, Semifinals, day 2:
  - Spain 2–1 United States
    - **Bob Bryan/Mike Bryan** (USA) def. Marcel Granollers/Marc López (ESP) 6–3, 3–6, 7–5, 7–5
  - Argentina 1–2 Czech Republic
    - **Tomáš Berdych/Radek Štěpánek** (CZE) def. Carlos Berlocq/Eduardo Schwank (ARG) 6–3, 6–4, 6–3
- Davis Cup World Group play-offs, day 2:
  - Kazakhstan 2–1 Uzbekistan
    - **Andrey Golubev/Yuri Schukin** (KAZ) def. Farrukh Dustov/Denis Istomin (UZB) 7–6^{(7-3)}, 6–3, 6–4
  - Germany 1–2 Australia
    - **Chris Guccione/Lleyton Hewitt** (AUS) def. Benjamin Becker/Philipp Petzschner 6–3, 6–2, 2–6, 7–6^{(7–4)}
  - Japan 1–2 Israel
    - **Jonathan Erlich/Andy Ram** (ISR) def. Tatsuma Ito/Yūichi Sugita (JPN) 5–7, 6–3, 6–3, 6–1
  - **Belgium** 3–0 Sweden
    - **Ruben Bemelmans/Olivier Rochus** (BEL) def. Andreas Vinciguerra (SWE) 6–4, 4–6, 6–3, 6–2
  - Canada 2–1 South Africa
    - **Raven Klaasen/Izak van der Merwe** (RSA) def. Daniel Nestor/Vasek Pospisil 6–4, 7–6^{(7–2)}, 7–6^{(7–5)}
  - **Brazil** 3–0 Russia
    - **Marcelo Melo/Bruno Soares** (BRA) def. Alex Bogomolov, Jr./Teymuraz Gabashvili (RUS) 7–5, 6–2, 7–6^{(9–7)}
  - Italy 2–1 Chile
    - **Jorge Aguilar/Paul Capdeville** (CHI) def. Daniele Bracciali/Andreas Seppi (ITA) 6–4, 4–6, 6–4, 6–2
  - Netherlands 1–2 Switzerland
    - **Robin Haase/Jean-Julien Rojer** (NED) def. Roger Federer/Stanislas Wawrinka (SWI) 6–4, 6–2, 5–7, 6–3

=== 14 September 2012 (Friday) ===
==== Football (soccer) ====
- CAF Champions League group stage, final matchday (teams **in bold** advance to semifinals):
  - Group A: ASO Chlef (Algeria) 1–0 (Tunisia) **Espérance ST**
    - Final standings: Espérance ST 9 points, **(Nigeria) Sunshine Stars** 6, ASO Chlef 3, (Tunisia) Étoile du Sahel disqualified.

==== Roller hockey ====
- European Championship in Paredes, Portugal, matchday 6:
  - France 7–1 England
  - Switzerland 0–6 Spain
  - Portugal 9–1 Germany

==== Tennis ====
- Davis Cup World Group, Semifinals, day 1:
  - Spain 2–0 United States
    - **David Ferrer** (ESP) def. Sam Querrey (USA) 4–6, 6–2, 6–2, 6–4
    - **Nicolás Almagro** (ESP) def. John Isner (USA) 6–4, 4–6, 6–4, 3–6, 7–5
  - Argentina 1–1 Czech Republic
    - **Juan Martín del Potro** (ARG) def. Radek Štěpánek (CZE) 6–4, 6–4, 6–2
    - **Tomáš Berdych** (CZE) def. Juan Mónaco (ARG) 6–1, 4–6, 1–6, 6–4, 6–4
- Davis Cup World Group play-offs, day 1:
  - Kazakhstan 1–1 Uzbekistan
    - **Denis Istomin** (UZB) def. Evgeny Korolev (KAZ) 6–3, 4–6, 6–2, 0–6, 6–3
    - **Mikhail Kukushkin** (KAZ) def. Farrukh Dustov (UZB) 6–2, 6–4, 3–6, 7–6^{(7–5)}
  - Germany 1–1 Australia
    - **Bernard Tomic** (AUS) def. Cedrik-Marcel Stebe (GER) 2–6, 6–3, 6–4, 7–6^{(7–4)}
    - **Florian Mayer** (GER) def. Lleyton Hewitt (AUS) 7–5, 6–3, 6–2
  - Japan 1–1 Israel
    - **Go Soeda** (JPN) def. Dudi Sela (ISR) 6–2, 6–4, 3–6, 6–4
    - **Amir Weintraub** (ISR) def. Tatsuma Ito (JPN) 6–3, 6–2, 6–4
  - Belgium 2–0 Sweden
    - **Steve Darcis** (BEL) def. Michael Ryderstedt (SWE) 6–3, 7–6^{(7–3)}, 6–0
    - **David Goffin** (BEL) def. Andreas Vinciguerra (SWE) 6–4, 6–3, 7–5
  - Canada 2–0 South Africa
    - **Vasek Pospisil** (CAN) def. Izak van der Merwe (RSA) 6–3, 6–4, 6–4
    - **Milos Raonic** (CAN) def. Nikala Scholtz (RSA) 7–5, 6–4, 7–5
  - Brazil 2–0 Russia
    - **Rogério Dutra da Silva** (BRA) def. Igor Andreev (RUS) 6–2, 6–1, retired
    - **Thomaz Bellucci** (BRA) def. Teymuraz Gabashvili (RUS) 6–3, 4–6, 6–0, 7–6^{(7–4)}
  - Italy 2–0 Chile
    - **Andreas Seppi** (ITA) def. Guillermo Hormazábal (CHI) 7–5, 6–1, 6–2
    - **Fabio Fognini** (ITA) def. Paul Capdeville (CZE) 2–6, 6–2, 6–7^{(6–8)}, 6–1, 6–2
  - Netherlands 0–2 Switzerland
    - **Roger Federer** (SWI) def. Thiemo de Bakker (NED) 6–3, 6–4, 6–4
    - **Stanislas Wawrinka** (SWI) def. Robin Haase (NED) 6–3, 3–6, 6–3, 7–6^{(7–4)}

=== 13 September 2012 (Thursday) ===
==== Roller hockey ====
- European Championship in Paredes, Portugal, matchday 5:
  - Germany 0–2 Switzerland
  - France 4–6 Italy
  - England 1–23 Portugal

=== 12 September 2012 (Wednesday) ===
==== Roller hockey ====
- European Championship in Paredes, Portugal, matchday 4:
  - Switzerland 13–0 England
  - Spain 4–1 France
  - Germany 2–6 Italy

=== 11 September 2012 (Tuesday) ===
==== Basketball ====
- FIBA EuroBasket 2013 qualification, final matchday (teams **in bold** qualify for the EuroBasket 2013):
  - Group A:
    - **Montenegro** 80–48 Slovakia
    - **Serbia** 83–67 **Israel**
    - Estonia 80–58 Iceland
      - Final standings: Montenegro 20 points, Israel, Serbia, Estonia 16, Iceland, Slovak Republic 11.
  - Group B:
    - **Germany** 81–68 Azerbaijan
    - Luxembourg 68–85 **Sweden**
      - Final standings: Germany 16 points, Sweden, Bulgaria, Azerbaijan 12, Luxembourg 8.
  - Group C:
    - **Croatia** 78–74 Austria
    - Cyprus 58–63 Hungary
      - Final standings: Croatia 16 points, **Ukraine** 14, Austria, Hungary 11, Cyprus 8.
  - Group D:
    - Romania 77–85 **Latvia**
    - **Georgia** 97–89 Netherlands
      - Final standings: **Bosnia and Herzegovina**, Georgia 14 points, Latvia 13, Netherlands 10. Romania 9.
  - Group E:
    - **Finland** 84–77 Switzerland
    - Albania 46–82 **Belgium**
      - Final standings: **Poland**, Finland 14 points, Belgium 13, Switzerland 11, Albania 8.
  - Group F:
    - Belarus 77–64 Portugal
    - **Turkey** 81–58 **Czech Republic**
      - Final standings: **Italy** 16 points, Turkey, Czech Republic 13, Belarus 10, Portugal 8.

==== Football (soccer) ====
- 2014 FIFA World Cup qualification:
  - AFC (fourth round):
    - Group A:
      - Uzbekistan 2–2 South Korea
      - Lebanon 1–0 Iran
    - Group B:
      - Japan 1–0 Iraq
      - Jordan 2–1 Australia
  - CONMEBOL (Round-Robin):
    - Chile 1–3 Colombia
    - Uruguay 1–1 Ecuador
    - Paraguay 0–2 Venezuela
    - Peru 1–1 Argentina
  - CONCACAF (third round), teams **in bold** advance to the fourth round:
    - Group A:
      - Antigua and Barbuda 0–1 Guatemala
      - United States 1–0 Jamaica
    - Group B:
      - Guyana 2–3 El Salvador
      - **Mexico** 1–0 Costa Rica
    - Group C:
      - Panama 2–0 Canada
      - Honduras 1–0 Cuba
  - OFC (third round):
    - New Zealand 6–1 Solomon Islands
    - Tahiti 0–4 New Caledonia
  - UEFA (first round):
    - Group A:
      - Serbia 6–1 Wales
      - Belgium 1–1 Croatia
      - Scotland 1–1 North Macedonia
    - Group B:
      - Bulgaria 1–0 Armenia
      - Italy 2–0 Malta
    - Group C:
      - Austria 1–2 Germany
      - Sweden 2–0 Kazakhstan
    - Group D:
      - Romania 4–0 Andorra
      - Turkey 3–0 Estonia
      - Hungary 1–4 Netherlands
    - Group E:
      - Cyprus 1–0 Iceland
      - Norway 2–1 Slovenia
      - Switzerland 2–0 Albania
    - Group F:
      - Israel 0–4 Russia
      - Northern Ireland 1–1 Luxembourg
      - Portugal 3–0 Azerbaijan
    - Group G:
      - Bosnia and Herzegovina 4–1 Latvia
      - Slovakia 2–0 Liechtenstein
      - Greece 2–0 Lithuania
    - Group H:
      - San Marino 0–6 Montenegro
      - Poland 2–0 Moldova
      - England 1–1 Ukraine
    - Group I:
      - Georgia 0–1 Spain
      - France 3–1 Belarus

==== Roller hockey ====
- European Championship in Paredes, Portugal, matchday 3:
  - Switzerland 2–3 France
  - Spain 21–1 England
  - Portugal 3–0 Italy

=== 10 September 2012 (Monday) ===
==== Roller hockey ====
- European Championship in Paredes, Portugal, matchday 2:
  - Germany 6–1 England
  - Spain 2–0 Italy
  - Portugal 7–3 France

==== Tennis ====
- Grand Slams:
  - US Open in New York City, United States, day 15:
    - Men's Singles, final: **Andy Murray** (GBR) [3] def. Novak Djokovic (SRB) [2] 7–6^{(12–10)}, 7–5, 2–6, 3–6, 6–2
      - Murray wins his first Grand Slam title and 24th overall. He becomes the first British male to win a Grand Slam singles title since Fred Perry in 1936.

=== 9 September 2012 (Sunday) ===
==== Auto racing ====
- Formula One:
  - Italian Grand Prix in Monza, Italy: (1) Lewis Hamilton (GBR) (McLaren-Mercedes) (2) Sergio Pérez (MEX) (Sauber-Ferrari) (3) Fernando Alonso (ESP) (Ferrari)
    - Drivers' championship standings (after 13 of 20 races): (1) Alonso 179 points (2) Hamilton 142 (3) Kimi Räikkönen (FIN) (Lotus-Renault) 141

==== Cycling ====
- Grand Tours:
  - Vuelta a España, Stage 21: (gold) John Degenkolb (GER) (Argos–Shimano) 2h 44' 57" (silver) Elia Viviani (ITA) (Liquigas–Cannondale) s.t. (bronze) Daniele Bennati (ITA) (RadioShack–Nissan) s.t.
    - Final general classification (all ESP): (1) Alberto Contador (Saxo Bank–Tinkoff Bank) 84h 59' 49" (2) Alejandro Valverde (Movistar Team) + 1' 16" (3) Joaquim Rodríguez (Team Katusha) + 1' 37"
      - Contador wins his second Vuelta and his 5th Grand Tour overall.
- UCI World Tour:
  - GP de Montréal: (gold) Lars Petter Nordhaug (NOR) (Team Sky) 5h 28' 29" (silver) Moreno Moser (ITA) (Liquigas–Cannondale) + 2" (bronze) Alexandr Kolobnev (RUS) (Team Katusha) + 2"
    - UCI World Tour standings (after 26 of 28 races): (1) Bradley Wiggins (GBR) (Team Sky) 601 points (2) Joaquim Rodríguez (ESP) (Team Katusha) 592 (3) Tom Boonen (BEL) (Omega Pharma–Quick-Step) 410

==== Roller hockey ====
- European Championship in Paredes, Portugal, matchday 1:
  - Spain 7–0 Germany
  - England 0–9 Italy
  - Portugal 3–1 Switzerland

==== Tennis ====
- Grand Slams:
  - US Open in New York City, United States, day 14:
    - Women's Singles, final: **Serena Williams** (USA) [4] def, Victoria Azarenka (BLR) [1] 6–2, 2–6, 7–5
      - Serena Williams wins her 4th US Open singles title and her 15th Grand Slam single title overall.
    - Women's Doubles, final: **Sara Errani (ITA) & Roberta Vinci (ITA)** def. Andrea Hlaváčková (CZE) & Lucie Hradecká (CZE) [3] 6–4, 6–2
      - Errani & Vinci win their first US Open title and his second Grand Slam overall.
    - Men's Singles, semifinals: **Novak Djokovic** (SRB) [2] def. David Ferrer (ESP) [4] 2–6, 6–1, 6–4, 6–2

=== 8 September 2012 (Saturday) ===
==== Basketball ====
- FIBA EuroBasket 2013 qualification:
  - Group A:
    - Iceland 92–101 Montenegro
    - Estonia 88–81 Serbia
    - Israel 106–73 Slovakia
  - Group B:
    - Sweden 86–91 Germany
    - Bulgaria 120–95 Luxembourg
  - Group C:
    - Ukraine 69–51 Cyprus
    - Hungary 79–81 Croatia
  - Group D:
    - Latvia 70–73 Georgia
    - Bosnia and Herzegovina 93–58 Romania
  - Group E:
    - Poland 89–59 Albania
    - Belgium 71–68 Finland
  - Group F:
    - Portugal 69–79 Turkey
    - Italy 83–58 Belarus

==== Cycling ====
- Grand Tours:
  - Vuelta a España, Stage 20: (gold) Denis Menchov (RUS) (Team Katusha) 4h 48' 48" (silver) Richie Porte (AUS) (Team Sky) + 17" (bronze) Kevin De Weert (BEL) (Omega Pharma–Quick-Step) s.t.
    - General classification (all ESP): (1) Alberto Contador (Saxo Bank–Tinkoff Bank) 82h 14' 52" (2) Alejandro Valverde (Movistar Team) + 1' 16" (3) Joaquim Rodríguez (Team Katusha) + 1' 37"

==== Football (soccer) ====
- 2014 FIFA World Cup qualification (UEFA):
  - Group A: Scotland 0–0 Serbia
  - Group B: Denmark 0–0 Czech Republic

==== Rugby union ====
- The Rugby Championship, Round 3:
  - In Wellington, New Zealand: New Zealand 21–5 Argentina
  - In Perth, Australia: Australia 26–19 South Africa
    - Standings: New Zealand 12 points, South Africa 7, Australia 4, Argentina 2.

==== Tennis ====
- Grand Slams:
  - US Open in New York City, United States, day 13:
    - Men's Singles, semifinals: **Andy Murray** (GBR) [3] def. Tomáš Berdych (CZE) [6] 5–7, 6–2, 6–1, 7–6^{(9–7)}

=== 7 September 2012 (Friday) ===
==== Cycling ====
- Grand Tours:
  - Vuelta a España, Stage 19: (gold) Philippe Gilbert (BEL) (BMC Racing Team) 4h 56' 25" (silver) Alejandro Valverde (ESP) (Movistar Team) s.t. (bronze) Daniel Moreno (ESP) (Team Katusha) s.t.
    - General classification (all ESP): (1) Alberto Contador (Saxo Bank–Tinkoff Bank) 77h 21' 49" (2) Valverde + 1' 35" (3) Joaquim Rodríguez (Team Katusha) + 2' 21"
- UCI World Tour:
  - Grand Prix Cycliste de Québec: (gold) Simon Gerrans (AUS) (Orica–GreenEDGE) 4h 53' 04" (silver) Greg Van Avermaet (BEL) (BMC Racing Team) s.t. (bronze) Rui Costa (POR) (Movistar Team) + 4"
    - UCI World Tour standings (after 25 of 28 races): Bradley Wiggins (GBR) (Team Sky) 601 points (2) Joaquim Rodríguez (ESP) (Team Katusha) 414 (3) Tom Boonen (BEL) (Omega Pharma–Quick-Step) 410

==== Football (soccer) ====
- 2014 FIFA World Cup qualification (UEFA):
  - Group A:
    - Croatia 1–0 North Macedonia
    - Wales 0–2 Belgium
  - Group B:
    - Malta 0–1 Armenia
    - Bulgaria 2–2 Italy
  - Group C:
    - Kazakhstan 1–2 Republic of Ireland
    - Germany 3–0 Faroe Islands
  - Group D:
    - Estonia 0–2 Romania
    - Andorra 0–5 Hungary
    - Netherlands 2–0 Turkey
  - Group E:
    - Albania 3–1 Cyprus
    - Slovenia 0–2 Switzerland
    - Iceland 2–0 Norway
  - Group F:
    - Russia 2–0 Northern Ireland
    - Azerbaijan 1–1 Israel
    - Luxembourg 1–2 Portugal
  - Group G:
    - Liechtenstein 1–8 Bosnia and Herzegovina
    - Lithuania 1–1 Slovakia
    - Latvia 1–2 Greece
  - Group H:
    - Montenegro 2–2 Poland
    - Moldova 0–5 England
  - Group I:
    - Georgia 1–0 Belarus
    - Finland 0–1 France
- 2014 FIFA World Cup qualification (CONMEBOL)
  - Colombia 4–0 Uruguay
  - Ecuador 1–0 Bolivia
  - Argentina 3–1 Paraguay
  - Peru 2–1 Venezuela

==== Tennis ====
- Grand Slams:
  - US Open in New York City, United States, day 12:
    - Men's Doubles, final: **Bob Bryan (USA) & Mike Bryan (USA) [2]** def. Leander Paes (IND) & Radek Štěpánek (CZE) [5] 6–3, 6–4
      - Bob and Mike Bryan win their 4th US Open and 12th Grand Slam title overall.
    - Women's Singles, semifinals:
      - **Victoria Azarenka** (BLR) [1] def. Maria Sharapova (RUS) [3] 3–6, 6–2, 6–4
      - **Serena Williams** (USA) [4] def. Sara Errani (ITA) [10] 6–1, 6–2

=== 6 September 2012 (Thursday) ===
==== Cycling ====
- Grand Tours:
  - Vuelta a España, Stage 18: (gold) Daniele Bennati (ITA) (RadioShack–Nissan) 4h 17' 17" (silver) Ben Swift (GBR) (Team Sky) s.t. (bronze) Allan Davis (AUS) (Orica–GreenEDGE) s.t.
    - General classification (all ESP): (1) Alberto Contador (Saxo Bank–Tinkoff Bank) 72h 25' 21" (2) Alejandro Valverde (Movistar Team) + 1' 52" (3) Joaquim Rodríguez (Team Katusha) + 2' 28"

==== Tennis ====
- Grand Slams:
  - US Open in New York City, United States, day 11:
    - Mixed Doubles, final: **Ekaterina Makarova (RUS) & Bruno Soares (BRA)** def. Květa Peschke (CZE) & Marcin Matkowski (POL) [4] 6–7^{(8–10)}, 6–1, [12–10]
      - Makarova & Soares win their first Grand Slam title.
    - Men's Singles, quarterfinals:
      - **David Ferrer** (ESP) [4] def. Janko Tipsarević (SRB) [8] 6–3, 6–7^{(5–7)}, 2–6, 6–3, 7–6^{(7–4)}
      - **Novak Djokovic** (SRB) [2] def. Juan Martín del Potro (ARG) [7] 6–2, 7–6^{(7–3)}, 6–4

=== 5 September 2012 (Wednesday) ===
==== American football ====
- NFL, Week 1:
  - Kickoff game in East Rutherford, New Jersey: Dallas Cowboys 24, New York Giants 17.

==== Basketball ====
- FIBA EuroBasket 2013 qualification:
  - Group A:
    - Israel 92–75 Iceland
    - Serbia 87–62 Slovakia
    - Montenegro 76–67 Estonia
  - Group B:
    - Germany 79–69 Bulgaria
    - Azerbaijan 82–76 Sweden
  - Group C:
    - Croatia 84–80 Ukraine
    - Austria 97–81 Hungary
  - Group D:
    - Georgia 103–107 Bosnia and Herzegovina
    - Netherlands 81–86 Latvia
  - Group E:
    - Finland 91–96 Poland
    - Switzerland 82–73 Belgium
  - Group F:
    - Turkey 82–83 Italy
    - Czech Republic 90–71 Portugal

==== Cycling ====
- Grand Tours:
  - Vuelta a España, Stage 17: (gold) Alberto Contador (ESP) (Saxo Bank–Tinkoff Bank) 4h 29' 20" (silver) Alejandro Valverde (ESP) (Movistar Team) + 6" (bronze) Sergio Henao (COL) (Team Sky) s.t.
    - General classification (all ESP): (1) Contador 68h 07' 54" (2) Valverde + 1' 52" (3) Joaquim Rodríguez (Team Katusha) + 2' 28"

==== Tennis ====
- Grand Slams:
  - US Open in New York City, United States, day 10:
    - Men's Singles, fourth round:
      - **Juan Martín del Potro** (ARG) [7] def. Andy Roddick (USA) [20] 6–7^{(1–7)}, 7–6^{(7–4)}, 6–2, 6–4
      - **Novak Djokovic** (SRB) [2] def. Stanislas Wawrinka (SWI) [18] 6–4, 6–1, 3–1, retired
      - **Janko Tipsarević** (SRB) [8] def. Philipp Kohlschreiber (GER) [19] 6–3, 7–6^{(7–5)}, 6–2
    - Men's Singles, quarterfinals:
      - **Tomáš Berdych** (CZE) [6] def. Roger Federer (SWI) [1] 7–6^{(7–1)}, 6–4, 3–6, 6–3
      - **Andy Murray** (GBR) [3] def. Marin Čilić (CRO) [12] 3–6, 7–6^{(7–4)}, 6–2, 6–0
    - Women's Singles, quarterfinals:
      - **Maria Sharapova** (RUS) [3] def. Marion Bartoli (FRA) [11] 3–6, 6–3, 6–4
      - **Serena Williams** (USA) [4] def. Ana Ivanovic (SRB) [12] 6–1, 6–3
      - **Sara Errani** (ITA) [10] def. Roberta Vinci (ITA) [20] 6–2, 6–4

=== 4 September 2012 (Thursday) ===
==== Football (soccer) ====
- U-20 Women's World Cup in Japan:
  - Semi-finals:
    - Nigeria 0–2 **United States**
    - Japan 0–3 **Germany**

==== Tennis ====
- Grand Slams:
  - US Open in New York City, United States, day 9:
    - Men's Singles, fourth round: **David Ferrer** (ESP) [4] def. Richard Gasquet (FRA) [13] 7–5, 7–6^{(7–2)}, 6–4
    - Women's Singles, quarterfinals: **Victoria Azarenka** (BLR) [1] def. Samantha Stosur (AUS) [7] 6–1, 4–6, 7–6^{(7–5)}

=== 3 September 2012 (Monday) ===
==== Cycling ====
- Grand Tours:
  - Vuelta a España, Stage 16: (gold) Dario Cataldo (ITA) (Omega Pharma–Quick-Step) 5h 18' 28" (2) Thomas De Gendt (BEL) (Vacansoleil–DCM) + 7" (3) Joaquim Rodríguez (ESP) (Team Katusha) + 2' 39"
    - General classification (all ESP): (1) Rodríguez 63h 38' 24" (2) Alberto Contador (Saxo Bank–Tinkoff Bank) + 28" (3) Alejandro Valverde (Movistar Team) + 2' 04"

==== Tennis ====
- Grand Slams:
  - US Open in New York City, United States, day 8:
    - Men's Singles, fourth round:
      - **Marin Čilić** (CRO) [12] def. Martin Kližan (SVK) 7–5, 6–4, 6–0
      - **Roger Federer** (SWI) [1] def. Mardy Fish (USA) [23] walkover
      - **Andy Murray** (GBR) [3] def. Milos Raonic (CAN) [15] 6–4, 6–4, 6–2
      - **Tomáš Berdych** (CZE) [6] def. Nicolás Almagro (ESP) [11] 7–6^{(7–4)}, 6–4, 6–1
    - Women's Singles, fourth round:
      - **Ana Ivanovic** (SRB) [12] def. Tsvetana Pironkova (BUL) 6–0, 6–4
      - **Serena Williams** (USA) [4] def. Andrea Hlaváčková (CZE) 6–0, 6–0
      - **Sara Errani** (ITA) [10] def. Angelique Kerber (GER) [6] 7–6^{(7–5)}, 6–3
      - **Roberta Vinci** (ITA) [20] def. Agnieszka Radwańska (POL) [2] 6–1, 6–4

=== 2 September 2012 (Sunday) ===
==== Auto racing ====
- Formula One:
  - Belgian Grand Prix in Spa: (1) Jenson Button (GBR) (McLaren-Mercedes) (2) Sebastian Vettel (GER) (Red Bull-Renault) (3) Kimi Räikkönen (FIN) (Lotus-Renault)
    - Drivers' championship standings (after 12 of 20 races): (1) Fernando Alonso (ESP) (Ferrari) 164 points (2) Vettel 140 (3) Mark Webber (AUS) (Red Bull-Renault) 132

=== 1 September 2012 (Saturday) ===
==== American football ====
- NCAA Division I FBS:
  - Emerald Isle Classic in Dublin, Ireland: Notre Dame 50, Navy 10.
  - Chick-fil-A Kickoff Game in Atlanta, Georgia: Clemson 26, Auburn 19.
  - Cowboys Classic in Arlington, Texas: Alabama 41, Michigan 14.

==== Cycling ====
- Grand Tours:
  - Vuelta a España, Stage 14 (all ESP): (gold) Joaquim Rodríguez (Team Katusha) 4h 10' 28" (silver) Alberto Contador (Saxo Bank–Tinkoff Bank) + 5" (bronze) Alejandro Valverde (Movistar Team) + 13"
    - General classification: (1) Rodríguez 53h 06' 33" (2) Contador + 22" (3) Chris Froome (GBR) (Team Sky) + 1' 41"

==== Football (soccer) ====
- CAF Champions League group stage, matchday 5:
  - Group B: Zamalek (Egypt) 1–1 (Ghana) Berekum Chelsea

==== Multi-sport ====
- Summer Paralympics in London:
  - Athletics:
    - Women's club throw F31/32/51: (gold) Maroua Ibrahmi (TUN) 1064 points (WR) (silver) Mounia Gasmi (ALG) 1052 (bronze) Gemma Prescott (GBR) 1015
    - Men's shot put F54/55/56: (gold) Jalil Bagheri Jeddi (IRN) 988 points (PR) (silver) Karol Kozun (POL) 973 (bronze) Robin Womack (GBR) 972
    - Men's long jump F13: (gold) Luis Felipe Gutierrez (CUB) 7.54 m (PR) (silver) Ángel Jiménez Cabeza (CUB) 7.14 m (bronze) Radoslav Zlatanov (BUL) 6.81 m
    - Men's 200 m T42: (gold) Richard Whitehead (GBR) 24.38 (WR) (silver) Shaquille Vance (USA) 25.55 (bronze) Heinrich Popow (GER) 25.90
    - Women's discus throw F11/12: (gold) Liangmin Zhang (CHN) 40.13 (PR) (silver) Hongxia Tang (CHN) 39.91 (bronze) Claire Williams (GBR) 39.63
    - Women's 200 m T36: (gold) Elena Ivanova (RUS) 30.25 (silver) Min Jae Jeon (KOR) 31.08 (bronze) Claudia Nicoleitzik (GER) 32.08
    - Women's 100 m T38: (gold) Margarita Goncharova (RUS) 13.45 (silver) Junfei Chen (CHN) 13.53 (bronze) Inna Stryzhak (UKR) 13.64
    - Women's shot put F54/55/56: (gold) Liwan Yang (CHN) 1057 points (WR) (silver) Marianne Buggenhagen (GER) 946 (bronze) Angela Madsen (USA) 934
    - Men's javelin throw F33/34: (gold) Mohsen Kaedi (IRN) 38.30 (WR) (silver) Yanzhang Wang (CHN) 38.23 (bronze) Kamel Kardjena (ALG) 26.40
    - Men's 100 m T13: (gold) Jason Smyth (IRL) 10.46 (WR) (silver) Luis Felipe Gutierrez (CUB) 11.02 (bronze) Jonathan Ntutu (RSA) 11.03
    - Men's triple jump F46: (gold) Fuliang Liu (CHN) 15.20 (WR) (silver) Arnaud Assoumani (FRA) 14.28 (bronze) Aliaksandr Subota (BLR) 14.00
    - Men's 100 m T35: (gold) Iurii Tsaruk (UKR) 12.62 (silver) Teboho Mokgalagadi (RSA) 13.10 (bronze) Xinhan Fu (CHN) 13.12
    - Women's javelin throw F46: (gold) Katarzyna Piekart (POL) 41.15 (WR) (silver) Nataliya Gudkova (RUS) 41.08 (bronze) Madeleine Hogan (AUS) 38.85
    - Women's 200 m T52: (gold) Michelle Stilwell (CAN) 33.80 (PR) (silver) Marieke Vervoort (BEL) (bronze) Kerry Morgan (USA) 36.49
    - Men's 800 m T37: (gold) Michael McKillop (IRL) 1:57.22 (WR) (silver) Mohamed Charmi (TUN) 2:01.45 (bronze) Brad Scott (AUS) 2:02.04
    - Men's 100 m T38: (gold) Evan O'Hanlon (AUS) 10.79 (WR) (silver) Dyan Buis (RSA) 11.11 (bronze) Wenjun Zhou (CHN) 11.22
    - Women's 200 m T46: (gold) Yunidis Castillo (CUB) 24.45 (WR) (silver) Alicja Fiodorow (POL) 25.49 (bronze) Anrune Liebenberg (RSA) 25.55
  - Cycling:
    - Men's 1 km time trial B: (gold) Neil Fachie (GBR) 1:01.351 (WR) (silver) José Enrique Porto Lareo (ESP) 1:02.707 (bronze) Rinne Oost (NED) 1:03.052
    - Men's individual pursuit C4: (gold) Carol-Eduard Novak (ROU) (silver) Jiří Ježek (CZE) (bronze) Jody Cundy (GBR)
    - Men's individual pursuit C5: (gold) Michael Gallagher (AUS) (silver) Jon-Allan Butterworth (GBR) (bronze) Xinyang Liu (CHN)
    - Women's 500 m time trial C1–3: (gold) Yin He (CHN) 39.158 (WR) (silver) Alyda Norbruis (NED) 39.174 (bronze) Jayme Paris (AUS) 40.476 (WR)
    - Women's 500 m time trial C4–5: (gold) Sarah Storey (GBR) 36.997 (silver) Jennifer Schuble (USA) 37.941 (bronze) Jianping Ruan (CHN) 38.194 (WR)
  - Equestrian:
    - Individual championship test grade II: (gold) Natasha Baker (GBR) 76.857 (silver) Britta Napel (GER) 76.048 (bronze) Angelika Trabert (GER) 76.000
    - Individual championship test grade Ib: (gold) Joann Formosa (AUS) 75.826 (silver) Lee Pearson (GBR) 75.391 (bronze) Pepo Puch (AUT) 75.043
  - Judo:
    - Men's 90 kg: (gold) Jorge Hierrezuelo Marcillis (CUB) (silver) Samuel Ingram (GBR) (bronze) Jorge Lencina (ARG) & Dartanyon Crockett (USA)
    - Men's 100 kg: (gold) Gwang-Geun Choi (KOR) (silver) Myles Porter (USA) (bronze) Antônio Tenório Silva (BRA) & Vladimir Fedin (RUS)
    - Men's +100 kg: (gold) Kento Masaki (JPN) (silver) Song Wang (CHN) (bronze) Yangaliny Jimenez Dominguez (CUB) & Ilham Zakiyev (AZE)
    - Women's 70 kg: (gold) Carmen Herrera (ESP) (silver) Tatiana Savostyanova (bronze) Qian Zhou (CHN) & Nikolett Szabo (HUN)
    - Women's +70 kg; (gold) Yanping Yuan (CHN) (silver) Nazan Akın (TUR) (bronze) Zoubida Bouazoug (ALG) & Irina Kalyanova (RUS)

==== Tennis ====
- Grand Slams:
  - US Open in New York City, United States, day 6:
    - Men's Singles, third round:
      - **Roger Federer** (SWI) [1] def. Fernando Verdasco (ESP) [25] 6–3, 6–4, 6–4
      - **Mardy Fish** (USA) [23] def. Gilles Simon (FRA) [16] 6–1, 5–7, 7–6^{(7–5)}, 6–3
      - **Andy Murray** (GBR) [3] def. Feliciano López (ESP) [30] 7–6^{(7–5)}, 7–6^{(7–5)}, 4–6, 7–6^{(7–4)}
      - **Tomáš Berdych** (CZE) [6] def. Sam Querrey (USA) [27] 6–7^{(6–8)}, 6–4, 6–3, 6–2
      - **Nicolás Almagro** (ESP) [11] def. Jack Sock (USA) 7–6^{(7–3)}, 6–7^{(4–7)}, 7–6^{(7–2)}, 6–1
      - **Milos Raonic** (CAN) [15] def. James Blake (USA) 6–3, 6–0, 7–6^{(7–3)}
      - **Marin Čilić** (CRO) [12] def. Kei Nishikori (JPN) 6–3, 6–4, 6–7^{(3–7)}, 6–3
      - **Martin Kližan** (SVK) def. Jérémy Chardy (FRA) [32] 6–4, 6–4, 6–4
    - Women's Singles, third round:
      - **Agnieszka Radwańska** (POL) [2] def. Jelena Janković (SRB) 6–3, 7–5
      - **Serena Williams** (USA) [4] def. Ekaterina Makarova (RUS) 6–4, 6–0
      - **Ana Ivanovic** (SRB) [12] def. Sloane Stephens (USA) 6–7^{(4–7)}, 6–4, 6–2
      - **Roberta Vinci** (ITA) [20] def. Dominika Cibulková (SVK) 6–2, 7–5
      - **Angelique Kerber** (GER) [6] def. Olga Govortsova (BLR) 6–1, 6–2
      - **Andrea Hlaváčková** (CZE) def. Maria Kirilenko (RUS) [14] 5–7, 6–4, 6–4
      - **Tsvetana Pironkova** (BUL) def. Silvia Soler Espinosa (ESP) 6–1, 6–7^{(3–7)}, 6–3
      - **Sara Errani** (ITA) def. Olga Puchkova (RUS) 6–1, 6–1
