= 2012 Copa Sudamericana =

Copa Bridgestone Sudamericana 2012 Copa Bridgestone Sul-americana 2012

Tournament details
- Dates: 24 July – 12 December 2012
- Teams: 47 (from 10 associations)

Final positions
- Champions: (Brazil) São Paulo (1st title)
- Runners-up: (Argentina) Tigre

Tournament statistics
- Matches played: 92
- Goals scored: 237 (2.58 per match)
- Top scorer(s): (Paraguay) Jonathan Fabbro (Uruguay) Carlos Núñez (Brazil) Fábio Renato (Colombia) Wason Rentería (Chile) Michael Ríos (5 goals each)

The 2012 Copa Sudamericana de Clubes (officially the 2012 Copa Bridgestone Sudamericana de Clubes for sponsorship reasons) was the 11th edition of the Copa Sudamericana, South America's secondary international club football tournament organized by CONMEBOL. The tournament was expanded from 39 teams in the previous edition to 47 teams, allowing the eight associations other than Argentina and Brazil to each enter four teams instead of three teams. Universidad de Chile were the defending champions, but lost to the eventual champion, São Paulo, in the quarterfinals.

Brazilian club São Paulo were crowned as the champion after defeating Argentine club Tigre in the finals. Having already qualified for the 2013 Libertadores Cup (for being 4th in the 2012 Brazilian League), São Paulo, after winning the 2012 Sudamericana Cup, would go on to vie for the 2013 Recopa Cup (Championship played between the Libertadores Cup champion and the Sudamericana Cup champion) and the 2013 Suruga Cup.

== Qualified teams ==
| Association | Team (Berth) | Entry stage | Qualification method |
|---|---|---|---|
| (Argentina) Argentina 6 berths | Independiente (Argentina 1) | Second Stage | 2011 tournaments aggregate table 3rd best non-champion |
| (Argentina) Argentina 6 berths | Racing (Argentina 2) | Second Stage | 2011 tournaments aggregate table 4th best non-champion |
| (Argentina) Argentina 6 berths | Tigre (Argentina 3) | Second Stage | 2011 tournaments aggregate table 5th best non-champion |
| (Argentina) Argentina 6 berths | Argentinos Juniors (Argentina 4) | Second Stage | 2011 tournaments aggregate table 6th best non-champion |
| (Argentina) Argentina 6 berths | Colón (Argentina 5) | Second Stage | 2011 tournaments aggregate table 7th best non-champion |
| (Argentina) Argentina 6 berths | Boca Juniors (Argentina 6) | Second Stage | 2011–12 Copa Argentina champion |
| (Bolivia) Bolivia 4 berths | Oriente Petrolero (Bolivia 1) | First Stage | 2011 Adecuación 3rd place |
| (Bolivia) Bolivia 4 berths | Universitario de Sucre (Bolivia 2) | First Stage | 2011 Apertura runner-up |
| (Bolivia) Bolivia 4 berths | Aurora (Bolivia 3) | First Stage | 2011 Apertura 4th place |
| (Bolivia) Bolivia 4 berths | Blooming (Bolivia 4) | First Stage | 2012 Clausura 5th place |
| (Brazil) Brazil 8 berths | São Paulo (Brazil 1) | Second Stage | 2011 Série A 6th place |
| (Brazil) Brazil 8 berths | Figueirense (Brazil 2) | Second Stage | 2011 Série A 7th place |
| (Brazil) Brazil 8 berths | Coritiba (Brazil 3) | Second Stage | 2011 Série A 8th place |
| (Brazil) Brazil 8 berths | Botafogo (Brazil 4) | Second Stage | 2011 Série A 9th place |
| (Brazil) Brazil 8 berths | Palmeiras (Brazil 5) | Second Stage | 2011 Série A 11th place |
| (Brazil) Brazil 8 berths | Grêmio (Brazil 6) | Second Stage | 2011 Série A 12th place |
| (Brazil) Brazil 8 berths | Atlético Goianiense (Brazil 7) | Second Stage | 2011 Série A 13th place |
| (Brazil) Brazil 8 berths | Bahia (Brazil 8) | Second Stage | 2011 Série A 14th place |
| (Chile) Chile 4+1 berths | Universidad de Chile (Defending champion) | Round of 16 | 2011 Copa Sudamericana champion |
| (Chile) Chile 4+1 berths | Universidad Católica (Chile 1) | First Stage | 2011 Copa Chile champion |
| (Chile) Chile 4+1 berths | Cobreloa (Chile 2) | First Stage | 2011 Clausura classification phase 2nd place |
| (Chile) Chile 4+1 berths | O'Higgins (Chile 3) | First Stage | 2012 Apertura classification phase 2nd place |
| (Chile) Chile 4+1 berths | Deportes Iquique (Chile 4) | First Stage | 2012 Apertura classification phase 3rd place |
| (Colombia) Colombia 4 berths | Millonarios (Colombia 1) | First Stage | 2011 Copa Colombia champion |
| (Colombia) Colombia 4 berths | Envigado (Colombia 2) | First Stage | 2011 Primera A aggregate table 3rd best non-champion |
| (Colombia) Colombia 4 berths | Deportes Tolima (Colombia 3) | First Stage | 2011 Primera A aggregate table 4th best non-champion |
| (Colombia) Colombia 4 berths | La Equidad (Colombia 4) | First Stage | 2011 Primera A aggregate table 5th best non-champion |
| (Ecuador) Ecuador 4 berths | Barcelona (Ecuador 1) | First Stage | 2012 Serie A first stage winner |
| (Ecuador) Ecuador 4 berths | LDU Loja (Ecuador 2) | First Stage | 2012 Serie A first stage 2nd place |
| (Ecuador) Ecuador 4 berths | Deportivo Quito (Ecuador 3) | First Stage | 2011 Serie A second stage winner |
| (Ecuador) Ecuador 4 berths | Emelec (Ecuador 4) | First Stage | 2012 Serie A first stage 3rd place |
| (Paraguay) Paraguay 4 berths | Olimpia (Paraguay 1) | First Stage | 2011 Primera División aggregate table best champion |
| (Paraguay) Paraguay 4 berths | Cerro Porteño (Paraguay 2) | First Stage | 2011 Primera División aggregate table 2nd best non-champion |
| (Paraguay) Paraguay 4 berths | Tacuary (Paraguay 3) | First Stage | 2011 Primera División aggregate table 3rd best non-champion |
| (Paraguay) Paraguay 4 berths | Guaraní (Paraguay 4) | First Stage | 2011 Primera División aggregate table 4th best non-champion |
| (Peru) Peru 4 berths | Universidad San Martín (Peru 1) | First Stage | 2011 Descentralizado 4th place |
| (Peru) Peru 4 berths | León de Huánuco (Peru 2) | First Stage | 2011 Descentralizado 5th place |
| (Peru) Peru 4 berths | Unión Comercio (Peru 3) | First Stage | 2011 Descentralizado 6th place |
| (Peru) Peru 4 berths | Inti Gas (Peru 4) | First Stage | 2011 Descentralizado 7th place |
| (Uruguay) Uruguay 4 berths | Nacional (Uruguay 1) | First Stage | 2011–12 Primera División champion |
| (Uruguay) Uruguay 4 berths | Cerro Largo (Uruguay 2) | First Stage | 2011–12 Primera División aggregate table 4th place |
| (Uruguay) Uruguay 4 berths | Liverpool (Uruguay 3) | First Stage | 2011–12 Primera División aggregate table 5th place |
| (Uruguay) Uruguay 4 berths | Danubio (Uruguay 4) | First Stage | 2011–12 Primera División aggregate table 6th place |
| (Venezuela) Venezuela 4 berths | Mineros (Venezuela 1) | First Stage | 2011 Copa Venezuela champion |
| (Venezuela) Venezuela 4 berths | Deportivo Lara (Venezuela 2) | First Stage | 2011–12 Primera División aggregate table 1st place |
| (Venezuela) Venezuela 4 berths | Monagas (Venezuela 3) | First Stage | 2011–12 Primera División Serie Sudamericana winner with better aggregate |
| (Venezuela) Venezuela 4 berths | Deportivo Táchira (Venezuela 4) | First Stage | 2011–12 Primera División Serie Sudamericana winner with worse aggregate |

== Draw ==
The draw was held on June 29, 2012 (postponed from original date of June 26), 12:00 UTC−04:00 at CONMEBOL's Convention Center in Luque, Paraguay.

The tournament is played in single-elimination format, with each tie played over two legs. The draw mechanism was as follows:

First Stage

- The 32 teams from the eight countries other than Argentina and Brazil, excluding the defending champion, were drawn against each other. The teams were divided into South Zone (Chile, Uruguay, Paraguay, Bolivia) and North Zone (Colombia, Ecuador, Peru, Venezuela). Teams which qualified through berths 1 were drawn against teams which qualified through berths 4, and teams which qualified through berths 2 were drawn against teams which qualified through berths 3, with the former playing the second leg at home.

Second Stage

- The 16 winners of the First Stage were drawn against each other, where a winner from the South Zone were drawn against a winner from the North Zone.
- The 6 teams from Argentina were drawn against each other, where the matchups were based on the berths which the teams qualify through: 1 v 6, 2 v 5, 3 v 4, with the former playing the second leg at home.
- The 8 teams from Brazil were drawn against each other, where the matchups were based on the berths which the teams qualify through: 1 v 8, 2 v 7, 3 v 6, 4 v 5, with the former playing the second leg at home.

Final stages

- The 15 winners of the Second Stage, together with the defending champion, were assigned a "seed" starting from the round of 16 (the defending champion and the winners from Argentina and Brazil were assigned even "seeds", the winners from the other eight countries were assigned odd "seeds"). The "seeding" was used to determine the bracket of the final stages, with the higher-seeded team playing the second leg at home in each tie.

== Schedule ==
All dates listed are Wednesdays, but matches may be played on the day before (Tuesdays) and after (Thursdays) as well.

| Stage | First leg | Second leg |
|---|---|---|
| First Stage | July 25; August 1 | August 8, 15, 22 |
| Second Stage | August 1, 15, 22, 29 | August 22, 29; September 19 |
| Round of 16 | September 26; October 3 | October 24 |
| Quarterfinals | October 31 | November 7, 14 |
| Semifinals | November 21 | November 28 |
| Finals | December 5 | December 12 |

== Preliminary stages ==
The first two stages of the competition are the First Stage and Second Stage. Both stages are largely played concurrent to each other.

=== First stage ===
The First Stage began on July 24 and ended on August 23. Team 1 played the second leg at home.

| Team 1 | Agg. | Team 2 | 1st leg | 2nd leg |
South Zone
| Olimpia (Paraguay) | 2–1 | (Uruguay) Danubio | 0–0 | 2–1 |
| Nacional (Uruguay) | 4–2 | (Chile) Deportes Iquique | 0–2 | 4–0 |
| Universidad Católica (Chile) | 4–1 | (Bolivia) Blooming | 1–1 | 3–0 |
| Oriente Petrolero (Bolivia) | 2–2 (a) | (Paraguay) Guaraní | 1–0 | 1–2 |
| Universitario de Sucre (Bolivia) | 1–5 | (Uruguay) Liverpool | 0–3 | 1–2 |
| Cerro Largo (Uruguay) | 1–2 | (Bolivia) Aurora | 1–2 | 0–0 |
| Cobreloa (Chile) | 3–2 | (Paraguay) Tacuary | 1–0 | 2–2 |
| Cerro Porteño (Paraguay) | 7–3 | (Chile) O'Higgins | 3–3 | 4–0 |
North Zone
| Millonarios (Colombia) | 3–0 | (Peru) Inti Gas | 0–0 | 3–0 |
| Universidad San Martín (Peru) | 1–2 | (Ecuador) Emelec | 0–1 | 1–1 |
| Mineros (Venezuela) | 3–1 | (Colombia) La Equidad | 1–0 | 2–1 |
| Barcelona (Ecuador) | 5–1 | (Venezuela) Deportivo Táchira | 0–0 | 5–1 |
| Deportivo Lara (Venezuela) | 1–3 | (Colombia) Deportes Tolima | 1–3 | 0–0 |
| León de Huánuco (Peru) | 2–4 | (Ecuador) Deportivo Quito | 0–1 | 2–3 |
| Envigado (Colombia) | 2–0 | (Peru) Unión Comercio | 0–0 | 2–0 |
| LDU Loja (Ecuador) | 6–2 | (Venezuela) Monagas | 2–0 | 4–2 |

=== Second stage ===
The Second Stage began on July 31 and ended on September 20.

| Team 1 | Agg. | Team 2 | 1st leg | 2nd leg |
|---|---|---|---|---|
| Guaraní (Paraguay) | 3–5 | (Colombia) Millonarios | 2–4 | 1–1 |
| Bahia (Brazil) | 0–4 | (Brazil) São Paulo | 0–2 | 0–2 |
| Envigado (Colombia) | 1–2 | (Uruguay) Liverpool | 1–1 | 0–1 |
| Argentinos Juniors (Argentina) | 2–6 | (Argentina) Tigre | 1–2 | 1–4 |
| Mineros (Venezuela) | 2–6 | (Paraguay) Cerro Porteño | 2–2 | 0–4 |
| Atlético Goianiense (Brazil) | 2–2 (4–2 p) | (Brazil) Figueirense | 1–1 | 1–1 |
| Olimpia (Paraguay) | 0–1 | (Ecuador) Emelec | 0–1 | 0–0 |
| Grêmio (Brazil) | 3–3 (a) | (Brazil) Coritiba | 1–0 | 2–3 |
| Cobreloa (Chile) | 3–4 | (Ecuador) Barcelona | 0–0 | 3–4 |
| Universidad Católica (Chile) | 3–3 (a) | (Colombia) Deportes Tolima | 2–0 | 1–3 |
| Colón (Argentina) | 5–2 | (Argentina) Racing | 3–1 | 2–1 |
| Deportivo Quito (Ecuador) | 5–2 | (Bolivia) Aurora | 2–1 | 3–1 |
| Boca Juniors (Argentina) | 3–3 (a) | (Argentina) Independiente | 3–3 | 0–0 |
| LDU Loja (Ecuador) | 2–2 (a) | (Uruguay) Nacional | 0–1 | 2–1 |
| Palmeiras (Brazil) | 3–3 (a) | (Brazil) Botafogo | 2–0 | 1–3 |

== Final stages ==
Teams from the Round of 16 onwards are seeded depending on which second stage tie they won (i.e., the winner of Match O1 would be assigned the 1 seed, etc.; the defending champion, Universidad de Chile, was assigned the 10 seed).

=== Bracket ===
In each tie, the higher-seeded team played the second leg at home.

Round of 16
1 | (Colombia) Millonarios | 1 | 3
16 | (Brazil) Palmeiras | 3 | 0
8 | (Brazil) Grêmio | 1 | 2
9 | (Ecuador) Barcelona | 0 | 1
4 | (Argentina) Tigre | 0 | 4
13 | (Ecuador) Deportivo Quito | 2 | 0
5 | (Paraguay) Cerro Porteño | 2 | 2
12 | (Argentina) Colón | 1 | 1
2 | (Brazil) São Paulo (a) | 1 | 0
15 | (Ecuador) LDU Loja | 1 | 0
7 | (Ecuador) Emelec | 2 | 0
10 | Universidad de Chile | 2 | 1
3 | (Uruguay) Liverpool | 1 | 1
14 | (Argentina) Independiente | 2 | 2
6 | (Brazil) Atlético Goianiense | 0 | 3
11 | (Chile) U. Católica (a) | 2 | 1

Quarterfinals
1 | (Colombia) Millonarios | 0 | 3
8 | (Brazil) Grêmio | 1 | 1
4 | (Argentina) Tigre | 0 | 4
5 | (Paraguay) Cerro Porteño | 1 | 2
2 | (Brazil) São Paulo | 2 | 5
10 | Universidad de Chile | 0 | 0
14 | (Argentina) Independiente | 2 | 1
11 | (Chile) Universidad Católica | 2 | 2

Semifinals
1 | (Colombia) Millonarios | 0 | 1
4 | (Argentina) Tigre (a) | 0 | 1
2 | (Brazil) São Paulo (a) | 1 | 0
11 | (Chile) Universidad Católica | 1 | 0

Finals
4 | (Argentina) Tigre | 0 | 0
2 | (Brazil) São Paulo | 0 | 2

=== Round of 16 ===
The Round of 16 began on September 25 and ended on October 25. Team 1 played the second leg at home.

| Team 1 | Agg. | Team 2 | 1st leg | 2nd leg |
|---|---|---|---|---|
| Millonarios (Colombia) | 4–3 | (Brazil) Palmeiras | 1–3 | 3–0 |
| São Paulo (Brazil) | 1–1 (a) | (Ecuador) LDU Loja | 1–1 | 0–0 |
| Liverpool (Uruguay) | 2–4 | (Argentina) Independiente | 1–2 | 1–2 |
| Tigre (Argentina) | 4–2 | (Ecuador) Deportivo Quito | 0–2 | 4–0 |
| Cerro Porteño (Paraguay) | 4–2 | (Argentina) Colón | 2–1 | 2–1 |
| Atlético Goianiense (Brazil) | 3–3 (a) | (Chile) Universidad Católica | 0–2 | 3–1 |
| Emelec (Ecuador) | 2–3 | Universidad de Chile | 2–2 | 0–1 |
| Grêmio (Brazil) | 3–1 | (Ecuador) Barcelona | 1–0 | 2–1 |

=== Quarterfinals ===
The Quarterfinals began on October 30 and ended on November 15. Team 1 played the second leg at home.

| Team 1 | Agg. | Team 2 | 1st leg | 2nd leg |
|---|---|---|---|---|
| Millonarios (Colombia) | 3–2 | (Brazil) Grêmio | 0–1 | 3–1 |
| São Paulo (Brazil) | 7–0 | Universidad de Chile | 2–0 | 5–0 |
| Universidad Católica (Chile) | 4–3 | (Argentina) Independiente | 2–2 | 2–1 |
| Tigre (Argentina) | 4–3 | (Paraguay) Cerro Porteño | 0–1 | 4–2 |

=== Semifinals ===
The Semifinals began on November 22 and ended on November 29. Team 1 played the second leg at home.

| Team 1 | Agg. | Team 2 | 1st leg | 2nd leg |
|---|---|---|---|---|
| Millonarios (Colombia) | 1–1 (a) | (Argentina) Tigre | 0–0 | 1–1 |
| São Paulo (Brazil) | 1–1 (a) | (Chile) Universidad Católica | 1–1 | 0–0 |

=== Finals ===
The Finals were played over two legs, with the higher-seeded team playing the second leg at home. If the teams were tied on points and goal difference at the end of regulation in the second leg, the away goals rule would not be applied and 30 minutes of extra time would be played. If still tied after extra time, the title would be decided by penalty shootout.

December 5, 2012
20:50 UTC−3

| Tigre (Argentina) | 0–0 | (Brazil) São Paulo |
|---|---|---|
| | Report |

Estadio Alberto J. Armando (La Bombonera), Buenos Aires
Referee: Antonio Arias (Paraguay)

December 12, 2012
21:50 UTC−2

| São Paulo (Brazil) | 2–0 | (Argentina) Tigre |
|---|---|---|
| Lucas 22'; Osvaldo 28' | Report |

Estádio Cícero Pompeu de Toledo (Morumbi), São Paulo
Attendance: 67,042
Referee: Enrique Osses (Chile)

São Paulo won on points 4–1.

Copa Bridgestone Sudamericana de Clubes
2012 Champion

São Paulo
First Title

== Top goalscorers ==
| Pos | Player | Club | Goals |
|---|---|---|---|
| 1 | (Paraguay) Jonathan Fabbro | (Paraguay) Cerro Porteño | 5 |
| 1 | (Uruguay) Carlos Núñez | (Uruguay) Liverpool | 5 |
| 1 | (Brazil) Fábio Renato | (Ecuador) LDU Loja | 5 |
| 1 | (Colombia) Wason Rentería | (Colombia) Millonarios | 5 |
| 1 | (Chile) Michael Ríos | (Chile) Universidad Católica | 5 |
| 6 | (Argentina) Julio Bevacqua | (Ecuador) Deportivo Quito | 4 |
| 6 | (Colombia) Wilberto Cosme | (Colombia) Millonarios | 4 |
| 6 | (Argentina) Roberto Nanni | (Paraguay) Cerro Porteño | 4 |
| 9 | (Venezuela) Alejandro Guerra | (Venezuela) Mineros de Guayana | 3 |
| 9 | (Paraguay) Santiago Salcedo | (Paraguay) Cerro Porteño | 3 |
| 9 | (Brazil) Willian José | (Brazil) São Paulo | 3 |

== Awards ==
=== Player of the week ===
| Week | Player | Team | Notes |
|---|---|---|---|
| Jul 24–26 | (Venezuela) Richard Blanco | (Chile) O'Higgins | |
| Jul 31–Aug 1 | (Brazil) Rogério Ceni | (Brazil) São Paulo | |

== See also ==
- Libertadores
- Recopa
- Suruga
