= Carlos Núñez (footballer) =

Uruguayan footballer (born 1992)

Personal information
- Full name: Carlos Rodrigo Núñez Techera
- Date of birth: 22 June 1992 (age 34)
- Place of birth: Canelones, Uruguay
- Height: 1.74 m (5 ft 9 in)
- Position: Forward

Team information
- Current team: Cerro Largo
- Number: 10

Youth career
- Liverpool de Canelones
- Liverpool de Montevideo

Senior career*
Years	Team	Apps	(Gls)
2010–2017	Liverpool de Montevideo	44	(10)
2013–2015	→ Peñarol (ownership)	30	(8)
2015–2016	→ Racing Club (loan)	8	(3)
2016	→ Chiapas (loan)	2	(0)
2017	Guaraní	8	(1)
2018	Liverpool de Montevideo	10	(2)
2018	Unión La Calera	11	(2)
2019–2020	Deportivo Pasto	8	(1)
2019	→ Rampla Juniors (loan)	10	(3)
2020–	Cerro Largo	8	(1)
- * Club domestic league appearances and goals as of 19:00, 13 July 2021 (UTC)

Carlos Rodrigo Núñez Techera (born 22 June 1992) is a Uruguayan football footballer who plays as a forward for Cerro Largo.

== Career ==
=== Liverpool ===
He played in the lower divisions of Liverpool de Canelones and from there was transferred to sixteen to youth divisions Liverpool of Montevideo, being promoted to the main roster a year next.

He debuted in Primera Division on 14 February 2010 to National for the Clausura tournament of the season 2009-10 and he scored his first official goal on 27 February 2011 to Tacuarembó, for the fourth round of the Clausura championship 2010-11. He played eleven of the twelve games played down Liverpool in the tournament but it was not until the following year that took hold in the team, usually being holder in 2012.

During this year he debuted in international competitions, facing Universitario de Sucre by 2012 Copa Sudamericana, making two goals for his team win 3–0. He played six games for Liverpool in the tournament as a starter and scored five goals, which earned him to be one of the scorers in the championship.

=== Peñarol ===
In February 2013 his assignment was agreed until 2015 to Peñarol which he bought for $1 million 25% of its transfer; where he debuted on February 23 against Fénix.

After arriving at Peñarol in 2013 went through countless injuries, was Uruguayan champion in the 2012–2013 season where he scored one goal against Liverpool and a bad performance but good dancing, along with a couple of indiscipline they did not trust to make a continuity between eleven in the course of the two years he was, despite being a powerful striker.

=== Racing Club ===
In 2015 after a complicated output Penarol was not as beloved by the fans is assigned to Racing Club of Argentina for $480,000, with a purchase option of $4,000,000. His first match was played against Olimpo de Bahia Blanca in the tie 0 to 0. His second game was against Sporting Cristal, the 2015 Copa Libertadores where she entered the past 5 minutes in the defeat of his team by 2 to 1. The third game it was against Colon de Santa Fe in the victory 4–1, where he converted his first goal The Academy, came after a pitch, Disco was struggling with a defense that managed to anticipate but rejected evil, Santiago Naguel assisted him perfectly entitled where I faced the Santa Fe goalkeeper Jorge' Bill 'Broun eluded defined right and putting the 3-0 and he was the man of the match. His fourth game was against Sporting Cristal, the Copa Libertadores, where replacement Gustavo Bou and which will change the face of the team, the first was to pressure situation Renzo Revoredo who wanted to play for the archer Diego Penny, and after failure Disco take to beat Revoredo that demolition in the area cometiendole and criminal in which the goal converted by Diego Milito. Then his second situation was in a counterattack where he received the pass Oscar Romero, Carlitos hit a long pass to Ezequiel Videla that defined above Penny and put the 2 to 0 March 22, 2015 makes his 2nd goal, Oscar Romero I shot a long shot just started the game, Charlie peak at full speed behind Esteban Saveljich and the command to save the 23 seconds into the game, making the score 1–0, meeting in which The Hawk tied it at 5 minutes left. Against Hurricane entered replacement Santiago Naguel, then in the 35th minute of the second half, he took a pass from Washington Camacho, Disco he took her to confront Marcos Diaz, that eluded him and became his third goal of The Academy in the 2–0 victory against Hurricane Patricios Park. After that game and after the studies carried out, torn ligaments in his right knee would be confirmed. The injury will require between 6 and 8 months of inactivity.

== Clubs ==
Club	Season	Ligue		Cups National		Cups International		Total	
Club	Season	Match	Goal	Match	Goal	Match	Goal	Match	Goal
Liverpool; Uruguay	2009-10	2	0	–		–		2	0
Liverpool; Uruguay	2010-11	11	5	–		–		11	5
Liverpool; Uruguay	2011-12	21	5	–		–		21	5
Liverpool; Uruguay	2012-13	10	0	–		6	5	16	5
Liverpool; Uruguay	Total	44	10	–		6	5	50	15
Peñarol; Uruguay	2012-13	9	1	–		2	0	11	1
Peñarol; Uruguay	2013-14	15	6	–		2	0	17	6
Peñarol; Uruguay	2014-15	6	1	–		4	1	10	2
Peñarol; Uruguay	Total	30	8	–		8	1	38	9
Racing Club; Argentina
Racing Club; Argentina	2015	8	3	-		2	0	10	3
Racing Club; Argentina	Total	8	3	–		2	0	10	3
Total		82	21	–		16	6	98	27
Racing Club de Avellaneda 2-0 Huracan, 12.04.15

== Honours ==
=== Club ===
Peñarol

- Uruguayan Primera División (1): 2012–13

=== Individual ===
- 2012 Copa Sudamericana top scorer: 5 goals (with Fábio Renato, Jonathan Fabbro, Michael Ríos and Wason Rentería)
