= Santiago Barboza =

Uruguayan footballer (born 1989)

Personal information
- Full name: Ángel Santiago Barboza Manzzi
- Date of birth: 3 October 1989 (age 37)
- Place of birth: Rocha, Uruguay
- Height: 1.80 m (5 ft 11 in)
- Position: Forward

Team information
- Current team: Rocha

Youth career
- 2008–2010: Rocha

Senior career*
Years	Team	Apps	(Gls)
2011	Rocha	?	(?)
2012	Cerro Largo	4	(0)
2013–2014	Atenas	26	(16)
2013	→ LDU Loja (loan)	11	(0)
2015–2017	Cobreloa	17	(5)
2015–2016	→ Defensor Sporting (loan)	16	(3)
2017	Marathón	10	(1)
2017–2018	Atenas	39	(12)
2019–2021	Rocha		
- * Club domestic league appearances and goals as of 23:00, 19 February 2020 (UTC)

Ángel Santiago Barboza Manzzi (born October 3, 1989) is a Uruguayan footballer currently playing for Deportivo Achuapa.

== Career ==
On 26 July 2012, he scored a goal against Bolivian side Aurora in the 2012 Copa Sudamericana which was the first goal ever for Cerro Largo F.C. in an international competition.

In January 2013, he signed a new deal with Second Division club Atenas de San Carlos.

In July 2013, he was transferred to the Ecuadorian side LDU Loja with a loan deal of six months with an option of acquisition.
