= Patricio Troncoso =

Chilean footballer (born 1993)

Personal information
- Full name: Patricio Antonio Troncoso Baeza
- Date of birth: 7 June 1993 (age 33)
- Place of birth: Puente Alto, Santiago, Chile
- Height: 1.75 m (5 ft 9 in)
- Position: Attacking midfielder

Team information
- Current team: General Velásquez
- Number: 10

Senior career*
Years	Team	Apps	(Gls)
2012–2016	Cobreloa	38	(1)
2015–2016	→ Colchagua (loan)	25	(1)
2017	Deportes Limache	–	(–)
2018	General Velásquez	26	(4)
2019–2021	Iberia	33	(3)
2021–2022	General Velásquez	38	(5)
2023–2024	Deportes Concepción	2	(0)
2024	Trasandino	7	(0)
2025–	General Velásquez	2	(0)
- * Club domestic league appearances and goals as of 4 May 2025

Patricio Antonio Troncoso Baeza (born 7 June 1993) is a Chilean footballer who plays for Segunda División side General Velásquez as an attacking midfielder.
