= Ángel Gastón Díaz =

Argentine footballer

Gastón Díaz
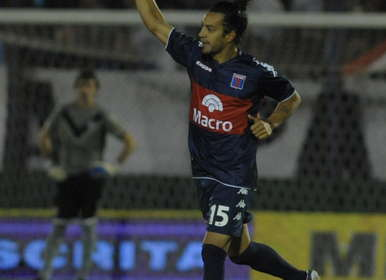
- Díaz in 2011

Personal information
- Full name: Ángel Gastón Díaz
- Date of birth: March 26, 1981 (age 45)
- Place of birth: Lomas de Zamora, Argentina
- Height: 1.75 m (5 ft 9 in)
- Position: Right winger

Senior career*
Years	Team	Apps	(Gls)
2002–2006	Los Andes	97	(4)
2006	Ceahlăul	15	(1)
2007	FC Brașov	13	(2)
2007–2008	Sarmiento	31	(0)
2008–2010	Colegiales	63	(11)
2010–2014	Tigre	87	(4)
2014–2017	Aldosivi	70	(8)
2017–2018	Colegiales	32	(5)
2019–2021	Deportivo Merlo	27	(1)
Total		435	(36)

Managerial career
- 2022–2023: Cañuelas
- * Club domestic league appearances and goals as of 16 May 2022

Ángel Gastón Díaz (born March 26, 1981) is an Argentinian former footballer who played as a midfielder and a current manager.

In the 2006–07 season, Díaz played in Romania for Ceahlăul Piatra Neamţ in the First Division, and for FC Brașov in the second half of the season in the Second Division.
