= Jonathan Fabbro =

Paraguayan footballer (born 1982)

- Born: Jonathan Fabbro; 16 January 1982 (age 44); Santiago del Estero, Argentina
- Height: 1.88 m (6 ft 2 in)
- Criminal charge: Sexual activity with a minor
- Penalty: 14 years in prison
Association football career
- Position: Attacking midfielder
Youth career
- 1990–2000: Argentinos Juniors
Senior career*
Years	Team	Apps	(Gls)
2000–2001	Argentinos Juniors	0	(0)
2002	Mallorca B	5	(0)
2002–2003	Boca Juniors	6	(1)
2004–2005	Once Caldas	39	(5)
2005–2006	Sinaloa	35	(7)
2006	Atlético Mineiro	4	(0)
2006	Universidad Católica	20	(6)
2007–2010	Guaraní	101	(35)
2011–2016	Cerro Porteño	133	(40)
2013–2014	→ River Plate (loan)	11	(0)
2016–2017	Chiapas	27	(7)
2017	Lobos BUAP	14	(1)
Total		395	(102)
International career
2012–2016	Paraguay	13	(4)
- * Club domestic league appearances and goals as of 23 October 2017

Jonathan Fabbro (born 16 January 1982) is an Argentine-born Paraguayan former footballer who played as an attacking midfielder. In 2019, he was sentenced to fourteen years in jail for abuse of children.

Born in Argentina, he became a naturalised citizen of Paraguay and played for its national football team. He is the brother of former footballer Darío Fabbro.

== Career ==
=== Early career ===
Fabbro commenced his football career at Asociación Atlética Argentinos Juniors and remained there for 9 years, going through all of the youth divisions at the club. When he hoped to make the step to the first-team at the age of 17, Fabbro had the opportunity to trial with Spanish club Real Betis, where Carlos Griguol was the coach. Fabbro awakened the interest of Mallorca who did not doubt in signing him, there he played 5 games before returning to Argentina.

=== Boca Juniors ===
In 2002, Fabbro returned from Spain's RCD Mallorca to join Boca Juniors Reserves and Academy. On 5 May 2002, Fabbro debuted for the first-team of Boca Juniors in a 2–1 home victory against Velez Sarsfield, where he was coached by Óscar Tabárez. Fabbro then went on to play for the club's first-team in a match against Independiente. In 2003, Fabbro returned to play for the Boca Juniors first-team in four more matches, where he would score one goal against Rosario Central in a match which Boca Juniors lost 7-2 having fielded the majority of the first-team with youth-team players. Fabbro would also participate in three continental matches, scoring one goal against Colón de Santa Fé in the 2003 Copa Sudamericana. Fabbro was eclipsed by players such as Juan Roman Riquelme, Walter Gaitán and the Brazilian Iarley. He did not play much in the first-team, but was a starting player in the reserve-team. With the arrival of Carlos Bianchi as coach at Boca Juniors, Fabbro lost gametime with the first-team. At Boca Juniors, Fabbro scored 2 goals in 9 games. At Boca Juniors, Fabbro's other teammates included Roberto Abbondanzieri, Rolando Schiavi, Sebastian Battaglia, Carlos Tevez, Abel Balbo, Guillermo Barros Schelotto, Hungarian Róbert Waltner and Japanese Naohiro Takahara.

=== Once Caldas ===
In 2003, Fabbro joined Colombian club Once Caldas, where he won the 2004 Copa Libertadores. In December 2004, Fabbro played against Porto in the Intercontinental Cup, finishing runners-up after losing in a penalty shoot-out (Fabbro missed the decisive penalty).

=== Guaraní ===
In 2007, Fabbro arrived at Guaraní, where he became a club icon. He was chosen as the Best Player in the 2008 Apertura. Fabbro led the team to winning the 2010 Apertura. Fabbro became a celebrity in Paraguay, and in 2010, he finished the procedure to acquire citizenship to play for the national team. In January 2011, Fabbro's representative claimed that he could continue at Guaraní but with a better contract. By this point, Fabbro was in the interest of Cerro Porteño and Olimpia Asunción. Fabbro's representative indicated that Fabbro felt good at Guaraní but wanted to earn more.

=== Cerro Porteño ===
In February 2011, Fabbro paid a buy out clause of US$228,000 to Guaraní to be able to transfer to Cerro Porteño. Fabbro agreed to give away 12% of the transfer cost to Guaraní from his transfer. Fabbro also gave Guaraní US $150,000, which was what Guaraní owed Fabbro for the sale of his economic rights. For all of this, Fabbro renounced so that he could be free and play at Cerro Porteño, even removing a labour lawsuit that he filed against Guaraní. Fabbro signed an agreement with Cerro Porteño for four years. He later confessed that Guaraní's president never wanted to sell him.

During the 2011 Copa Libertadores group stage, Fabbro scored an equalizer in an away game against Chilean team Colo-Colo to 2–2, after losing 2–0. In the last minutes, he scored with a free kick from almost 30 metres to win the game to 3–2 and to qualify to the round of 16 stage.

=== River Plate ===
In 2013, Fabbro joined River Plate on a one-year loan by a special request from its coach Ramon Diaz. Later, Fabbro spoke on 90 Minutos on Fox Sports Argentina, telling that his stint at River Plate damaged him by losing ground at Cerro Porteño and his place in the national team during the FIFA World Cup qualifiers.

"I would have liked to have more minutes, been able to play more often, to see if I was at the level which River Plate represents. Equally, I am content and happy for having passed through such a big club." – Fabbro speaking about his stint at River Plate.

== International career ==
In 2010, Fabbro obtained Paraguayan citizenship in order to play for the Paraguay national team. In March 2010, Fabbro completed the legal process of the Paraguayan naturalisation and awaited to be selected for the national team. In 2010, following his Paraguayan naturalisation, ABC Color announced that Fabbro was in the plans of Paraguay's national team coach Gerardo Martino.

In August 2012, national team coached Gerardo Pelusso praised Fabbro for his wish of playing for Paraguay, debuting in the second half of a 3–3 friendly draw against Guatemala in Washington, D.C., and scoring from a free kick 8 minutes after entering the field. 10 minutes followed and Fabbro habilitated teammate Hernan Perez to score Paraguay's third goal of the game.

On 7 September 2012, Fabbro made his second appearance for Paraguay in a 3–1 away defeat against Argentina in a World Cup qualification game, equalising the scores for 1–1 with a penalty in the 18th minute.

On 6 September 2013, Fabbro scored in the 16th minute of a 4–0 home victory against Bolivia in a World Cup qualification match.

In May 2015, Fabbro was pre-selected in a list of 30 footballers by national team coach Ramon Diaz for the 2015 Copa América. In September 2015, Fabbro showed happy to return to train with the national team after not selected for the 2015 Copa América. On 5 September 2015, Fabbro scored an equalising goal in the 51st minute to be 1–1 in a 3–2 away defeat against Chile in an exhibition game.

On 17 November 2015, Fabbro had his last participation with Paraguay when he appeared on the bench in a 2–1 home victory against Bolivia in World Cup qualifier.

== Personal life ==
By 2010, Fabbro was a celebrity in Paraguay and obtained Paraguayan citizenship in the same year. From 2011 to 2019, he was in a relationship with Paraguayan model Larissa Riquelme. Fabbro and Riquelme formed an ideal relationship for the press, which had them in sports magazines.

=== Legal troubles and child sexual abuse ===
In 2010, Fabbro accidentally hit with his car and killed a 23-year-old woman, Mónica Beatriz Deppeller, who was taking her five-year-old son to school on her motorbike in Videla, Santa Fe, Argentina. Fabbro was eventually sued by the victim's family and had money docked from his wages to pay a compensation, but in 2012 he and his girlfriend Larissa Riquelme hit another motorcyclist during a car chase with Paraguayan police.

In 2017, Fabbro was accused of sexually abusing his 11-year-old goddaughter (daughter of his brother Darío) and another underage girl. In May 2018, the footballer was extradited from Mexico to Argentina by order of Interpol, and imprisoned.

In 2019, Fabbro was found guilty of at least five counts of "severely outrageous sexual abuse" against his niece and goddaughter between 2015 and 2017. Fabbro was officially sentenced to fourteen years in jail.
