= Michael Ríos =

Chilean footballer (born 1985)

Personal information
- Full name: Michael Fabián Ríos Ripoll
- Date of birth: 24 April 1985 (age 41)
- Place of birth: Santiago, Chile
- Height: 1.74 m (5 ft 9 in)
- Position: Right midfielder

Team information
- Current team: Cajón del Maipo (manager)

Youth career
- Santiago Morning

Senior career*
Years	Team	Apps	(Gls)
2007–2010	Santiago Morning	67	(5)
2008	→ San Marcos (loan)	29	(4)
2011	Deportes Iquique	32	(3)
2012–2015	Universidad Católica	104	(24)
2016	Deportes Iquique	16	(5)
2016–2017	Colo-Colo	9	(0)
2018	Deportes Iquique	14	(0)
2019	Rangers	18	(3)
2020	Independiente Cauquenes	0	(0)
2020–2021	San Antonio Unido	19	(4)
2021	Lautaro de Buin	0	(0)
2022	Deportes Melipilla	0	(0)
Total		308	(48)

International career
2013	Chile	1	(0)

Managerial career
- 2025–: Cajón del Maipo
- * Club domestic league appearances and goals

Michael Fabián Ríos Ripoll (born 24 April 1985) is a Chilean former footballer who played as a right midfielder. He is the current manager of Cajón del Maipo.

== Club career ==
Ríos began his career in Santiago Morning aged 17, then joining to powerhouse club Universidad Católica in 2012, having prior spells at Deportes Iquique and San Marcos de Arica, eternal rivals at the country's northern zone.

In 2021, he signed with Chilean Segunda Profesional side Lautaro de Buin, but the team could only play in the Copa Chile.

He retired at the end of the 2021–22 season.

== Coaching career ==
In May 2025, Ríos was appointed the manager of Club Social y Deportivo Cajón del Maipo in the Chilean Tercera B.

== Controversies ==
Rios has been processed by the Chilean judicial system due to his participation in the robbery of a truck full of nuts. His manager referred to the incident expressing that "At the beginning people were talking about drug trafficking, that's not Michael style. He was just offered nuts."

== Honours ==
Colo-Colo

- Primera División: 2017–T
- Copa Chile: 2016
- Supercopa de Chile: 2017
