= 2002 Copa Sudamericana finals =

- Event: 2002 Copa Sudamericana
Atlético Nacional	San Lorenzo
(Colombia)	(Argentina)
0	4
- on aggregate

First leg
Atlético Nacional	San Lorenzo
0	4
- Date: 27 November 2002
- Venue: Estadio Atanasio Girardot, Medellín
- Referee: Márcio Rezende

Second leg
San Lorenzo	Atlético Nacional
0	0
- Date: 11 December 2002
- Venue: Estadio Pedro Bidegain, Buenos Aires
- Referee: Epifanio González
- Attendance: 40,779

The 2002 Copa Sudamericana finals was a two-legged football match played to determine the champion of the 2002 Copa Sudamericana, the inaugural edition of this tournament. The tie was contested between Argentine side San Lorenzo de Almagro and Colombian side Atlético Nacional.

San Lorenzo won 4–0 on aggregate, achieving the second international title in their history.

== Qualified teams ==
Team	Previous finals app.
(Colombia) Atlético Nacional	None
(Argentina) San Lorenzo	None

== Venues ==
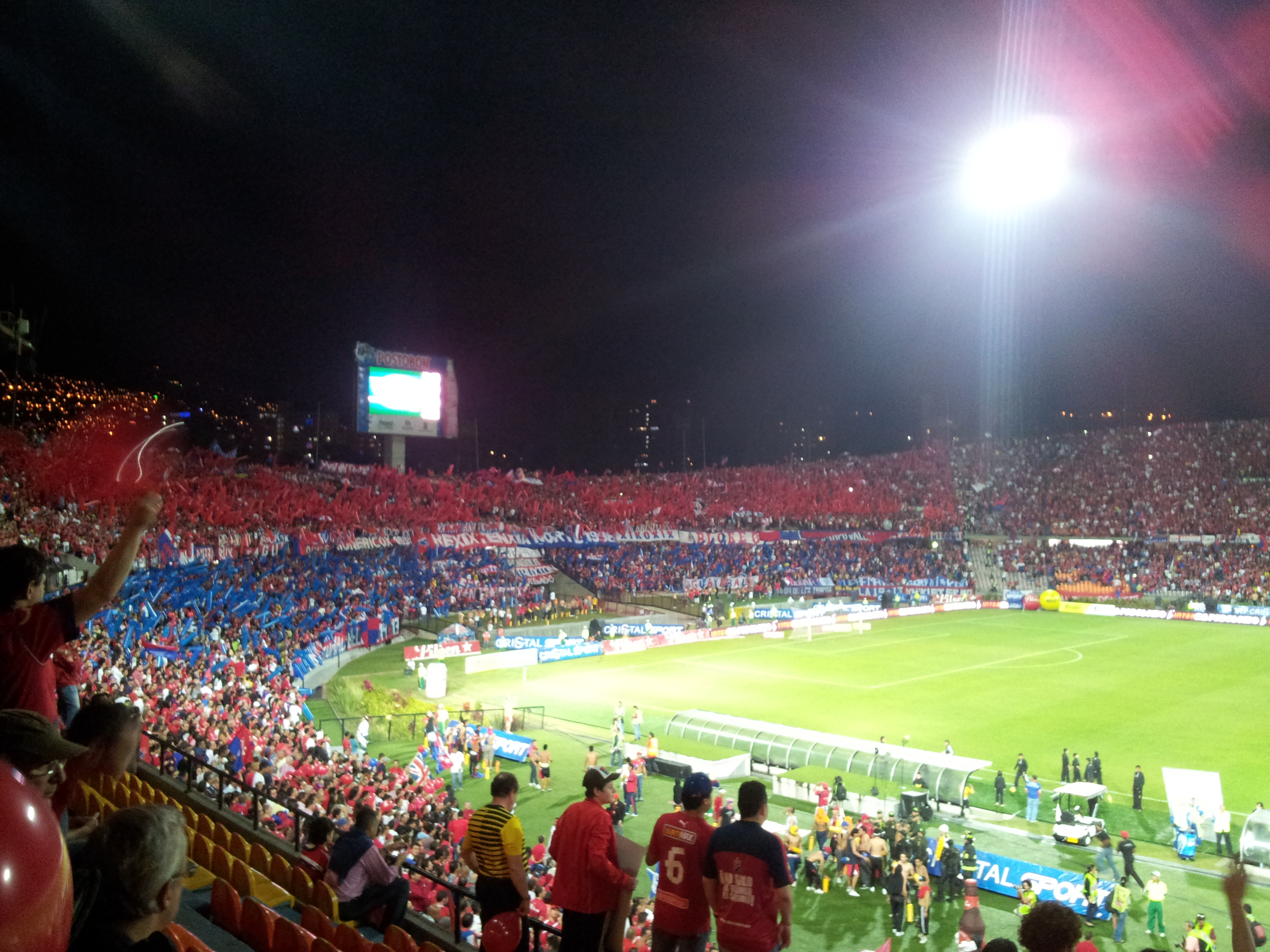
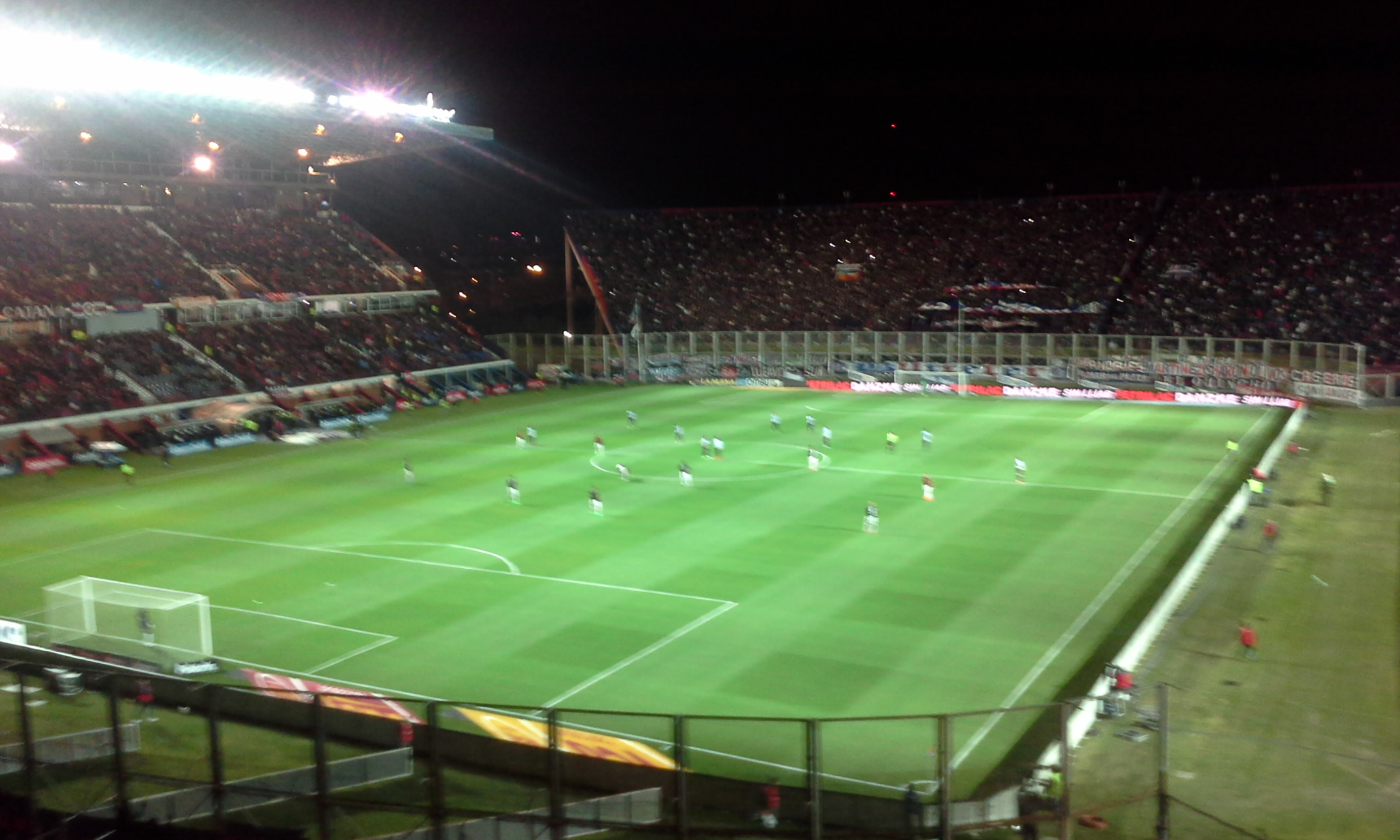
Estadio Atanasio Girardot (left) and Estadio Pedro Bidegain, venues for the series

== Route to the final ==
Atlético Nacional				Round	San Lorenzo			
Opponent	Agg.	1st leg	2nd leg		Opponent	Agg.	1st leg	2nd leg
Bye				First round	Bye			
(Colombia) América de Cali	3–1	1–0 (H)	2–1 (A)	Second round	(Venezuela) Monagas	8–1	3–0 (A)	5–1 (H)
(Chile) Santiago Wanderers	2–2 (p)	2–1 (H)	0–1 (A) (a.e.t.)	Quarter-finals	(Argentina) Racing Club	3–3 (p)	3–1 (H)	0–2 (A) (a.e.t.)
(Uruguay) Nacional	3–3 (p)	2–1 (H)	1–2 (A) (a.e.t.)	Semi-finals	(Bolivia) Bolívar	5–4	1–2 (A)	4–2 (H)

== Match details ==
=== First leg ===
2002 Copa Sudamericana finals
27 November 2002
19:10 (UTC-3)
First leg

Atlético Nacional (Colombia)	0–4	(Argentina) San Lorenzo
	Report	Saja 2' (pen.); Michelini 25'; Romagnoli 52'; Astudillo 67'

Estadio Atanasio Girardot, Medellín
Attendance: 52,000
Referee: Márcio Rezende (Brazil)

Atlético Nacional	San Lorenzo

note: Match was suspended at the 70th minute because a flare from the Atletico Nacional fans struck Aldo Paredes. A few minutes later, the match was resumed, but it was suspended at the 89th minute after Aquivaldo Mosquera was shown a red card. and Nacional fans started to throw objects onto the field.

=== Second leg ===
11 December 2002
21:10 (UTC-3)
Second leg

San Lorenzo (Argentina)	0–0	(Colombia) Atlético Nacional
	Report

Estadio Pedro Bidegain, Buenos Aires
Attendance: 40,779
Referee: Epifanio González (Paraguay)

San Lorenzo	Atlético Nacional

GK	1	(Argentina) Sebastián Saja
DF	12	(Paraguay) Celso Esquivel
DF	24	(Argentina) Gonzalo Rodríguez
DF	3	(Paraguay) Claudio Morel Rodríguez
DF	4	(Argentina) Aldo Paredes
MF	19	(Argentina) José Chatruc	(substituted off) 65'
MF	8	(Argentina) Mariano Herrón
MF	22	(Argentina) Cristian Zurita
MF	10	(Argentina) Leandro Romagnoli	(substituted off) 65'
FW	7	(Argentina) Rodrigo Astudillo
FW	9	(Argentina) Alberto Acosta	(substituted off) 85'
Substitutions:
FW	17	(Argentina) Daniel Cordone	(substituted on) 65'
FW	20	(Argentina) Damián Luna	(substituted on) 65'
MF	18	(Argentina) Alexis Cabrera	(substituted on) 85'
Manager:
(Argentina) Rubén Darío Insúa

GK	12	(Colombia) Edigson Velásquez
DF	24	(Colombia) Elkin Calle
DF	4	(Colombia) Samuel Vanegas	Yellow card
DF	4	(Colombia) Sergio Guzmán
DF	2	(Colombia) Carlos Díaz
MF	16	(Colombia) Felipe Chará
MF	18	(Colombia) Roberto Moreno	(substituted off) 61'
MF	15	(Colombia) Diego Toro
MF	9	(Colombia) Freddy Grisales
FW	19	(Colombia) Óscar Restrepo	Yellow card
FW	20	(Colombia) Martín Echeverría	(substituted off) 80'
Substitutions:
FW		(Colombia) Jair Rambal	(substituted on) 61'
FW		(Colombia) Robinson Rentería	(substituted on) 80'
Manager:
(Colombia) Alexis García
