= 2000–01 Sporting CP season =

Sporting CP
2000–01 season
- President: António Dias da Cunha
- Head coach: Fernando Mendes
- Stadium: Estádio José Alvalade
- Primeira Liga: 3rd
- Taça de Portugal: Semi-finals
- Supertaça Cândido de Oliveira: Winners
- UEFA Champions League: Group stage
- Top goalscorer: League: Alberto Acosta (14); All: Alberto Acosta (18)

The 2000–01 season was the 95th season in the history of Sporting Clube de Portugal and the club's 67th consecutive season in the top flight of Portuguese football.

== Competitions ==
=== Overall record ===
Competition	First match	Last match	Starting round	Final position	Record							
Competition	First match	Last match	Starting round	Final position	Pld	W	D	L	GF	GA	GD	Win %
Primeira Liga	20 August 2000	27 May 2001	Matchday 1	3rd	34	19	5	10	56	37	+19	55.88
Taça de Portugal	30 December 2000	22 March 2001	Fifth round	Semi-finals	5	3	1	1	13	7	+6	60.00
Supertaça Cândido de Oliveira	13 August 2000	16 May 2001	Final	Winners	3	1	2	0	1	0	+1	33.33
UEFA Champions League	12 September 2000	7 November 2000	Group stage	Group stage	6	0	2	4	5	15	−10	0.00
Total					48	23	10	15	75	59	+16	47.92

Source: Competitions

=== Primeira Liga ===
==== League table ====
Pos	Team	Pld	W	D	L	GF	GA	GD	Pts	Qualification or relegation
1	Boavista (C)	34	23	8	3	63	22	+41	77	Qualification to Champions League first group stage
2	Porto	34	24	4	6	73	27	+46	76	Qualification to Champions League second qualifying round
3	Sporting CP	34	19	5	10	56	37	+19	62	Qualification to UEFA Cup first round
4	Braga	34	16	9	9	58	48	+10	57	
5	União de Leiria	34	15	11	8	46	41	+5	56	

Source: Primeira Divisão
Rules for classification: 1) points; 2) head-to-head points; 3) head-to-head goal difference; 4) goal difference; 5) number of goals scored
(C) Champions

==== Results summary ====
Overall								Home						Away					
Pld	W	D	L	GF	GA	GD	Pts	W	D	L	GF	GA	GD	W	D	L	GF	GA	GD
34	19	5	10	56	37	+19	62	12	2	3	29	12	+17	7	3	7	27	25	+2

==== Results by round ====
Round	1	2	3	4	5	6	7	8	9	10	11	12	13	14	15	16	17	18	19	20	21	22	23	24	25	26	27	28	29	30	31	32	33	34
Ground	H	A	A	H	A	H	A	H	A	H	A	H	A	H	A	H	A	A	H	H	A	H	A	H	A	H	A	H	A	H	A	H	A	H
Result	W	W	L	D	W	W	W	L	W	W	W	D	L	W	D	W	W	L	W	L	L	W	W	W	D	W	L	W	L	W	D	L	L	W
Position	6	2	5	6	6	3	3	4	3	2	2	2	4	3	3	3	3	3	2	3	5	4	3	3	3	3	3	3	3	3	3	3	3	3

Source: BDFutbol
A = Away; H = Home; W = Win; D = Draw; L = Loss

==== Matches ====
20 August 2000 1	Sporting CP	1–0	Farense	Lisbon
				Stadium: Estádio José Alvalade

26 August 2000 2	Vitória de Guimarães	1–4	Sporting CP	Guimarães
				Stadium: Estádio D. Afonso Henriques

8 September 2000 3	Braga	3–2	Sporting CP	Guimarães
				Stadium: Estádio D. Afonso Henriques

16 September 2000 4	Sporting CP	1–1	Alverca	Lisbon
				Stadium: Estádio José Alvalade

23 September 2000 5	Gil Vicente	0–2	Sporting CP	Guimarães
				Stadium: Estádio Adelino Ribeiro Novo

1 October 2000 6	Sporting CP	2–0	Salgueiros	Lisbon
				Stadium: Estádio José Alvalade

14 October 2000 7	Aves	3–4	Sporting CP	Aves
				Stadium: Estádio do CD Aves

21 October 2000 8	Sporting CP	0–1	Porto	Lisbon
				Stadium: Estádio José Alvalade

29 October 2000 9	Beira-Mar	0–1	Sporting CP	Aveiro
				Stadium: Estádio Mário Duarte

3 November 2000 10	Sporting CP	4–0	Leiria	Lisbon
				Stadium: Estádio José Alvalade

11 November 2000 11	Estrela da Amadora	1–2	Sporting CP	Amadora
				Stadium: Estádio José Gomes

19 November 2000 12	Sporting CP	0–0	Boavista	Lisbon
				Stadium: Estádio José Alvalade

3 December 2000 13	Benfica	3–0	Sporting CP	Lisbon
				Stadium: Estádio da Luz

9 December 2000 14	Sporting CP	2–1	Belenenses	Lisbon
				Stadium: Estádio José Alvalade

17 December 2000 15	Paços de Ferreira	0–0	Sporting CP	Paços de Ferreira
				Stadium: Estádio da Mata Real

6 January 2001 16	Sporting CP	2–1	Campomaiorense	Lisbon
				Stadium: Estádio José Alvalade

12 January 2001 17	Marítimo	0–2	Sporting CP	Funchal
				Stadium: Estádio dos Barreiros

21 January 2001 18	Farense	2–1	Sporting CP	Faro
				Stadium: Estádio de São Luís

27 January 2001 19	Sporting CP	3–1	Vitória de Guimarães	Lisbon
				Stadium: Estádio José Alvalade

4 February 2001 20	Sporting CP	1–2	Braga	Lisbon
				Stadium: Estádio José Alvalade

17 February 2001 21	Alverca	3–1	Sporting CP	Alverca
				Stadium: Complexo do Alverca

24 February 2001 22	Sporting CP	3–1	Gil Vicente	Lisbon
				Stadium: Estádio José Alvalade

3 March 2001 23	Salgueiros	2–5	Sporting CP	Porto
				Stadium: Estádio Engenheiro Vidal Pinheiro

11 March 2001 24	Sporting CP	2–0	Aves	Lisbon
				Stadium: Estádio José Alvalade

19 March 2001 25	Porto	2–2	Sporting CP	Porto
				Stadium: Estádio das Antas

2 April 2001 26	Sporting CP	2–1	Beira-Mar	Lisbon
				Stadium: Estádio José Alvalade

7 April 2001 27	União de Leiria	2–0	Sporting CP	Leiria
				Stadium: Estádio Dr. Magalhães Pessoa

14 April 2001 28	Sporting CP	1–0	Estrela da Amadora	Lisbon
				Stadium: Estádio José Alvalade

21 April 2001 29	Boavista	1–0	Sporting CP	Porto
				Stadium: Estádio do Bessa

29 April 2001 30	Sporting CP	3–0	Benfica	Lisbon
				Stadium: Estádio José Alvalade

6 May 2001 31	Belenenses	1–1	Sporting CP	Lisbon
				Stadium: Estádio do Restelo

11 May 2001 32	Sporting CP	1–3	Paços de Ferreira	Lisbon
				Stadium: Estádio José Alvalade

20 May 2001 33	Campomaiorense	1–0	Sporting CP	Campo Maior
				Stadium: Estádio Capitão Cesar Correia

27 May 2001 34	Sporting CP	1–0	Marítimo	Lisbon
				Stadium: Estádio José Alvalade

=== Taça de Portugal ===
25 November 2000 Fourth round	União de Lamas	0–3	Sporting CP	Santa Maria de Lamas
15:00			Hugo 3'; Acosta 53'; Toñito 89'	Stadium: Estádio Comendador Henrique Amorim; Referee: Isidoro Rodrigues

30 December 2000 Fifth round	Sporting CP	4–1	Leixões	Lisbon
15:00	Pinto 7'; Acosta 43', 73'; Babb 59'		David 86'	Stadium: Estádio José Alvalade; Referee: Olegário Benquerença

16 January 2001 Sixth round	Sporting CP	3–3 (a.e.t.)	Nacional	Lisbon
21:00	Acosta 25'; Barbosa 77'; Mpenza 89'		Carvalho 37', 61'; Serginho 90' (pen.)	Stadium: Estádio José Alvalade; Referee: João Ferreira

7 February 2001 Sixth round replay	Nacional	0–2	Sporting CP	Funchal
18:00			Barbosa 35'; Fabri 79'	Stadium: Estádio da Madeira; Referee: Paulo Paraty

11 February 2001 Quarter-finals	Famalicão	1–3	Sporting CP	Vila Nova de Famalicão
19:00	Hélder 21'		Acosta 78'; Špehar 83', 89'	Stadium: Estádio Municipal 22 de Junho; Referee: Paulo Baptista

22 March 2001 Semi-finals	Porto	2–1 (a.e.t.)	Sporting CP	Porto
	Capucho 31', 100'		Beto 13'	Stadium: Estádio das Antas; Referee: Lucílio Batista

=== Supertaça Cândido de Oliveira ===
13 August 2000 First leg	Porto	1–1	Sporting CP	Porto
				Stadium: Estádio das Antas

31 January 2001 Second leg	Sporting CP	0–0 (1–1 agg.)	Porto	Lisbon
				Stadium: Estádio José Alvalade

16 May 2001 Replay	Porto	0–1	Sporting CP	Coimbra
				Stadium: Coimbra Municipal Stadium

=== UEFA Champions League ===
==== Group stage ====
Pos	Team	Pld	W	D	L	GF	GA	GD	Pts	Qualification	RMA	SPM	LEV	SPO
1	(Spain) Real Madrid	6	4	1	1	15	8	+7	13	Advance to second group stage	—	1–0	5–3	4–0
2	(Russia) Spartak Moscow	6	4	0	2	9	3	+6	12	Advance to second group stage	1–0	—	2–0	3–1
3	(Germany) Bayer Leverkusen	6	2	1	3	9	12	−3	7	Transfer to UEFA Cup	2–3	1–0	—	3–2
4	(Portugal) Sporting CP	6	0	2	4	5	15	−10	2		2–2	0–3	0–0	—

Source: UEFA

12 September 2000 1	Sporting CP (Portugal)	2–2	(Spain) Real Madrid	Lisbon, Portugal
		Report		Stadium: Estádio José Alvalade

20 September 2000 2	Bayer Leverkusen (Germany)	3–2	(Portugal) Sporting CP	Leverkusen, Germany
		Report		Stadium: BayArena

27 September 2000 3	Spartak Moscow (Russia)	3–1	(Portugal) Sporting CP	Moscow, Russia
		Report		Stadium: Luzhniki Stadium

17 October 2000 4	Sporting CP (Portugal)	0–3	(Russia) Spartak Moscow	Lisbon, Portugal
		Report		Stadium: Estádio José Alvalade

25 October 2000 5	Real Madrid (Spain)	4–0	(Portugal) Sporting CP	Madrid, Spain
		Report		Stadium: Santiago Bernabéu

7 November 2000 6	Sporting CP (Portugal)	0–0	(Germany) Bayer Leverkusen	Lisbon, Portugal
		Report		Stadium: Estádio José Alvalade
