= 2001 Copa Mercosur Finals =

- Event: 2001 Copa Mercosur
Flamengo	San Lorenzo
(Brazil)	(Argentina)
1	1
- (San Lorenzo won 4–3 on penalties)

First leg
Flamengo	San Lorenzo
0	0
- Date: 12 December 2001
- Venue: Maracanã Stadium, Rio de Janeiro
- Referee: Epifanio González (Paraguay)
- Attendance: ?

Second leg
San Lorenzo	Flamengo
1	1
- Date: 24 January 2002
- Venue: Estadio Pedro Bidegain, Buenos Aires
- Referee: Oscar Ruiz (Colombia)
- Attendance: 40,000

The 2001 Copa Mercosur Finals were the two-legged final that decided the winner of the 2001 Copa Mercosur, the fourth (and last) edition of the Copa Mercosur, South America's international club football tournament organized by CONMEBOL.

The finals were contested in two-legged home-and-away format between Argentinian team San Lorenzo de Almagro and Brazilian team Flamengo. The first leg was hosted by Flamengo at Maracanã Stadium in Rio de Janeiro on 22 November 2017, while the second leg was hosted by San Lorenzo at its own venue, Estadio Pedro Bidegain in Buenos Aires on 24 January 2002.

The second leg had originally been scheduled for December 19, but it had to be postponed to January 24, 2002 due to social unrest in Argentina.

After both matches ended tied on 90 minutes (0–0 the first game and 1–1 the second one), the winner was decided by penalty shoot-out, with San Lorenzo winning the series 4–3 and also winning its first international title organised by CONMEBOL (the first international had been in 1927 when San Lorenzo won Copa Aldao, organised by Argentine and Uruguayan Associations together). Goalkeeper Sebastián Saja was one of the keyplayers of the final, after stopping two penalties and converting one himself in the shoot-out, while Diego Capria kicked (and scored) the last penalty to make San Lorenzo win the series.

== Teams ==
Team	Previous finals app.
(Argentina) San Lorenzo	None
(Brazil) Flamengo	1 (**1999**)

Bold indicates winning years

== Venues ==
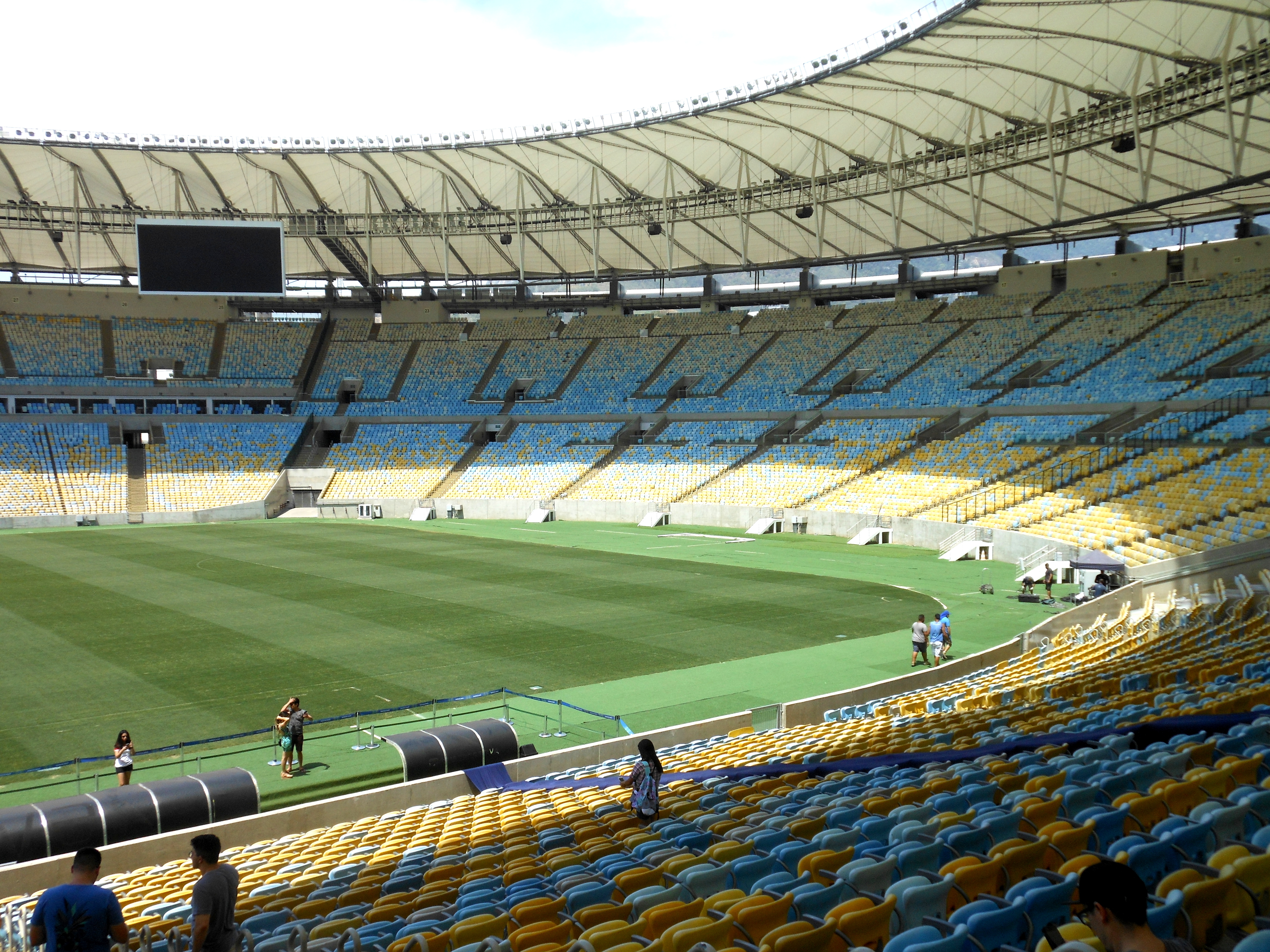
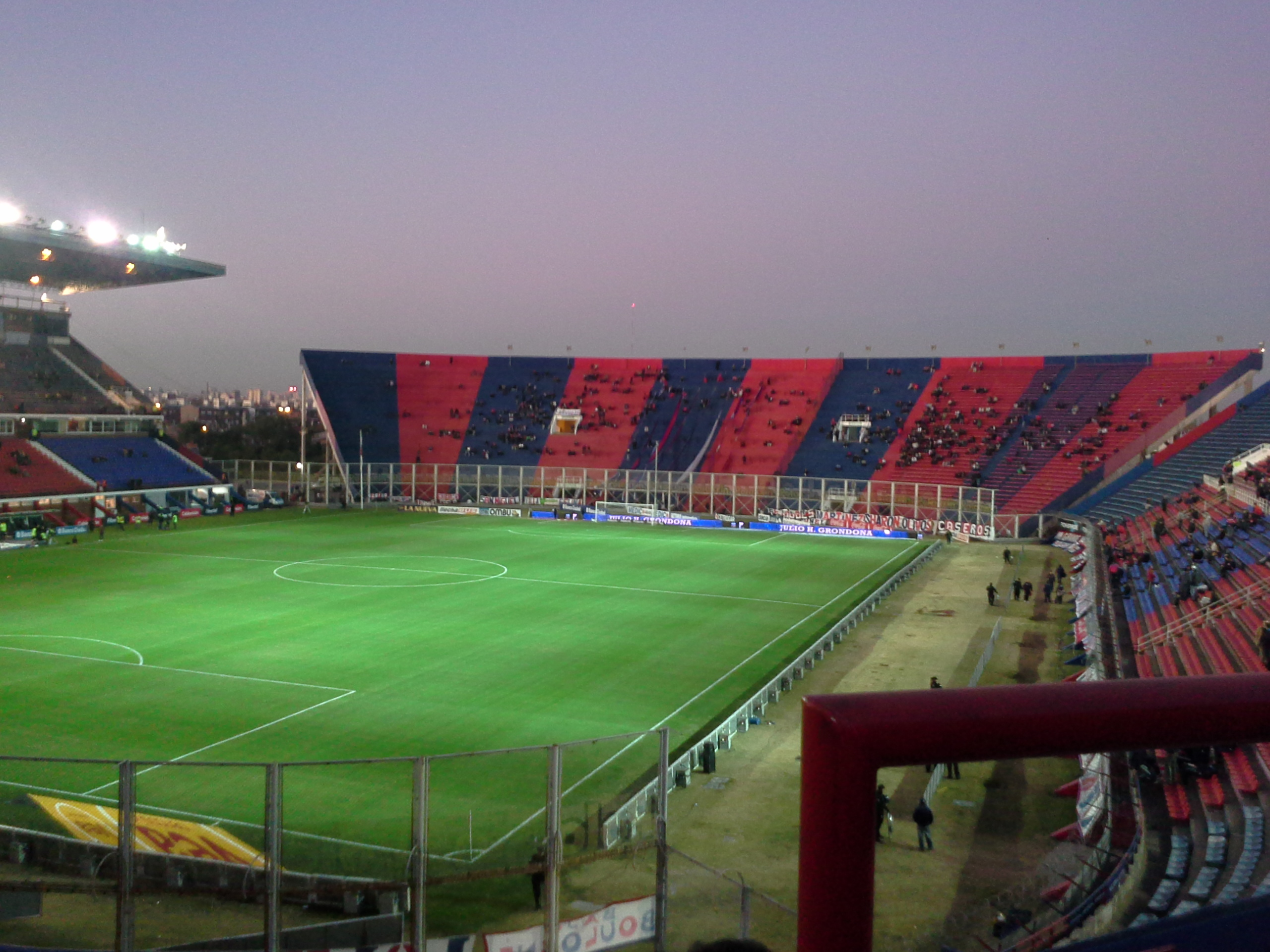
Maracanã Stadium in Rio de Janeiro (left) and Estadio Pedro Bidegain in Buenos Aires, venues for the finals

== Format ==
The finals were played on a home-and-away two-legged basis, with the higher-seeded team hosting the second leg. If tied on aggregate, neither the away goals rule nor 30 minutes of extra time would be used. Instead, the penalty shoot-out would be used to determine the winner.

== Matches ==
=== First leg ===
2001 Copa Mercosur Finals
12 December 2001
21:45
First leg

Flamengo (Brazil)	0–0	(Argentina) San Lorenzo

Maracanã Stadium, Rio de Janeiro
Referee: Epifanio González (Paraguay)

**Flamengo**	**San Lorenzo**

GK	1	(Brazil) Júlio César
DF	2	(Brazil) Alessandro	(substituted off) 85'
DF	3	(Brazil) Juan
DF	13	(Brazil) Fernando
DF	6	(Brazil) Cassio
MF	15	(Brazil) Jorginho
MF	9	(Brazil) Rocha
MF	7	(Brazil) Beto
MF	10	(Federal Republic of Yugoslavia) Dejan Petković	(substituted off) 33'
FW	11	(Brazil) Edílson
FW	8	(Brazil) Reinaldo
Substitutes:
MF	19	(Brazil) Roma	(substituted on) 33'
DF	14	(Brazil) Bruno Carvalho	(substituted on) 85'
Manager:
(Brazil) Carlos Alberto Torres

GK	1	(Argentina) Sebastián Saja
DF	17	(Argentina) Juan José Serrizuela
DF	2	(Argentina) Horacio Ameli
DF	6	(Argentina) Diego Capria
DF	4	(Argentina) Aldo Paredes
MF	22	(Argentina) Cristian Zurita	(substituted off) 61'
MF	5	(Argentina) Pablo Michelini
MF	11	(Argentina) Walter Erviti
MF	10	(Argentina) Leandro Romagnoli	(substituted off) 87'
MF	8	(Argentina) Guillermo Franco	(substituted off) 78'
FW	9	(Argentina) Bernardo Romeo
Substitutes:
MF	21	(Argentina) Lucas Pusineri	(substituted on) 61'
MF	19	(Argentina) Mario Santana	(substituted on) 78'
FW	19	(Argentina) Lucio Filomeno	(substituted on) 87'
Manager:
(Chile) Manuel Pellegrini

=== Second leg ===
24 January 2002
21:10 UTC-3
Second leg

San Lorenzo (Argentina)	1–1	(Brazil) Flamengo
Estévez 67'	Report	Leandro Machado 10'
Penalties
Acosta (penalty missed); Serrizuela (penalty missed); Romagnoli (penalty scored); Pusineri (penalty scored); Saja (penalty scored); Capria (penalty scored)	4–3	(penalty missed) Juan; (penalty scored) Petkovic; (penalty scored) Andrezinho; (penalty missed) Cássio; (penalty scored) Edson; (penalty missed) Roma

Estadio Pedro Bidegain, Buenos Aires
Attendance: 40,000
Referee: Oscar Ruíz (Colombia)

**San Lorenzo**	**Flamengo**

GK	1	(Argentina) Sebastián Saja
DF	17	(Argentina) Juan José Serrizuela
DF	2	(Argentina) Horacio Ameli
DF	6	(Argentina) Diego Capria
DF	4	(Argentina) Aldo Paredes
MF	8	(Argentina) Guillermo Franco	(substituted off) 45'
MF	5	(Argentina) Pablo Michelini
MF	11	(Argentina) Walter Erviti
MF	10	(Argentina) Leandro Romagnoli
FW	7	(Argentina) Raúl Estévez	(substituted off) 90'
FW	20	(Argentina) Alberto Acosta
Substitutes:
MF	21	(Argentina) Lucas Pusineri	(substituted on) 45'
MF	30	(Argentina) Leonardo Rodríguez	(substituted on) 90'
Manager:
(Chile) Manuel Pellegrini

GK	1	(Brazil) Júlio César
DF	30	(Brazil) Edson
DF	3	(Brazil) Juan
DF	13	(Brazil) Fernando	(substituted off) 84'
DF	6	(Brazil) Cassio
MF	5	(Brazil) Leandro Ávila
MF	15	(Brazil) Jorginho
MF	9	(Brazil) Rocha	(substituted off) 89'
MF	10	(Federal Republic of Yugoslavia) Dejan Petković
FW	18	(Brazil) Roma
FW	17	(Brazil) Leandro Machado	(substituted off) 60'
Substitutes:
FW	29	(Brazil) Jackson	(substituted on) 60'
DF	26	(Brazil) André Bahia	(substituted on) 84'
MF	21	(Brazil) Andrezinho	(substituted on) 89'
Manager:
(Brazil) Carlos Alberto Torres

Copa Mercosur
2001 Winner
(Argentina)
San Lorenzo
First title
