= 2001 Copa Mercosur =

Tournament details
- Dates: 21 July 2001 – 24 January 2002
- Teams: 20 (from 5 associations)

Final positions
- Champions: (Argentina) San Lorenzo (1st title)
- Runners-up: (Brazil) Flamengo

Tournament statistics
- Matches played: 73
- Goals scored: 197 (2.7 per match)
- Top scorer: (Argentina) Bernardo Romeo (10 goals)

The Copa Mercosur 2001 was the 4th and last season of the Copa Mercosur, CONMEBOL's club tournament.

The competition started on 21 July 2001 and concluded on 24 January 2002 with San Lorenzo beating Flamengo in the final.

== Participants ==
Country	Team
Argentina (6 berths)	Boca Juniors
Argentina (6 berths)	Independiente
Argentina (6 berths)	River Plate
Argentina (6 berths)	San Lorenzo
Argentina (6 berths)	Talleres
Argentina (6 berths)	Vélez Sársfield
Brazil (7 berths)	Corinthians
Brazil (7 berths)	Cruzeiro
Brazil (7 berths)	Flamengo
Brazil (7 berths)	Grêmio
Brazil (7 berths)	Palmeiras
Brazil (7 berths)	São Paulo
Brazil (7 berths)	Vasco da Gama
Chile (3 berths)	Colo-Colo
Chile (3 berths)	Universidad Católica
Chile (3 berths)	Universidad de Chile
Paraguay (2 berths)	Cerro Porteño
Paraguay (2 berths)	Olimpia
Uruguay (2 berths)	Nacional
Uruguay (2 berths)	Peñarol

== Details ==
- The 20 teams were divided into 5 groups of 4 teams. Each team plays the other teams in the group twice. The top team from each group qualified for the quarter-finals along with the best 3 runners up.
- From the quarter-finals to the final, two legs were played in each round. In the result of a draw, the match was decided by a penalty shoot out.

== Group stage ==
=== Group A ===
Pos	Team	Pld	W	D	L	GF	GA	GD	Pts	Qualification	(Paraguay) CER	(Chile) UCA	(Brazil) VAS	(Argentina) BOC
1	(Paraguay) Cerro Porteño	6	3	1	2	8	6	+2	10	Advance to Quarter-finals	—	2–0	2–1	2–1
2	(Chile) Universidad Católica	6	3	0	3	8	9	−1	9	Advance to Quarter-finals	1–0	—	2–1	2–1
3	(Brazil) Vasco da Gama	6	2	2	2	11	11	0	8		3–2	2–1	—	2–2
4	(Argentina) Boca Juniors	6	1	3	2	9	10	−1	6		0–0	3–2	2–2	—

Source: CONMEBOL
24 July 2001

Universidad Católica (Chile)	2–1	(Brazil) Vasco da Gama
Valdebenito 47'; Mirošević 81'	Report	Euller 18'

Estadio San Carlos de Apoquindo, Santiago, Chile
Referee: (Argentina) Horacio Elizondo

29 July 2001

Vasco da Gama (Brazil)	2–2	(Argentina) Boca Juniors
Pedrinho 26'; Patrício 58'	Report	Pérez 41', 65'

Estádio Mané Garrincha, Brasília, Brazil
Referee: (Paraguay) Epifanio González

1 August 2001

Boca Juniors (Argentina)	0–0	(Paraguay) Cerro Porteño
	Report

La Bombonera, Buenos Aires, Argentina
Referee: (Brazil) Wilson Souza Mendonça

7 August 2001

Cerro Porteño (Paraguay)	2–0	(Chile) Universidad Católica
Ramírez 56'; Ferreira 57'	Report

Estadio General Pablo Rojas, Asunción, Paraguay
Referee: (Argentina) Oscar Sequeira

21 August 2001

Cerro Porteño (Paraguay)	2–1	(Brazil) Vasco da Gama
Ferreira 53', 65'	Report	Juninho Paulista 60'

Estadio Tres de Febrero, Ciudad del Este, Paraguay
Referee: (Argentina) Claudio Martín

29 August 2001

Universidad Católica (Chile)	1–0	(Paraguay) Cerro Porteño
Díaz 59'	Report

Estadio San Carlos de Apoquindo, Santiago, Chile
Referee: (Brazil) Wagner Tardelli

12 September 2001

Cerro Porteño (Paraguay)	2–1	(Argentina) Boca Juniors
Alvarenga 41' (pen.); Ferreira 90'	Report	Schiavi 5'

Estadio Defensores del Chaco, Asunción, Paraguay
Referee: (Brazil) Antônio Pereira

13 September 2001

Vasco da Gama (Brazil)	2–1	(Chile) Universidad Católica
Romário 81'; Juninho Paulista 87'	Report	Núñez 76'

Estádio São Januário, Rio de Janeiro, Brazil
Referee: (Peru) Gilberto Hidalgo

19 September 2001

Universidad Católica (Chile)	2–1	(Argentina) Boca Juniors
Lenci 68'; Arrué 73'	Report	Barijho 14'

Estadio San Carlos de Apoquindo, Santiago, Chile
Referee: (Ecuador) Byron Moreno

25 September 2001

Boca Juniors (Argentina)	2–2	(Brazil) Vasco da Gama
Barbosa 79'; Carreño 80'	Report	Odvan 63'; Euller 83'

La Bombonera, Buenos Aires, Argentina
Referee: (Chile) Mario Sánchez

17 October 2001

Vasco da Gama (Brazil)	3–2	(Paraguay) Cerro Porteño
Alexandre Torres 7' (pen.); Paulo César 20'; Ely Thadeu 63'	Report	Roganovich 11', 75'

Estádio São Januário, Rio de Janeiro, Brazil
Referee: (Argentina) Daniel Giménez

18 October 2001

Boca Juniors (Argentina)	3–2	(Chile) Universidad Católica
Colautti 28'; Carreño 58'; Giménez 83'	Report	Valdebenito 57'; Norambuena 68'

La Bombonera, Buenos Aires, Argentina
Referee: (Brazil) Antônio Pereira

=== Group B ===
Pos	Team	Pld	W	D	L	GF	GA	GD	Pts	Qualification	(Brazil) FLA	(Argentina) SLA	(Uruguay) NAC	(Paraguay) OLI
1	(Brazil) Flamengo	6	5	0	1	11	6	+5	15	Advance to Quarter-finals	—	2–1	2–0	2–0 (Note: Flamengo v Olimpia match was awarded 2–0 win to Flamengo due to Olimpia being temporarily suspended due to a legal dispute with the Paraguayan FA.)
2	(Argentina) San Lorenzo	6	3	1	2	9	4	+5	10	Advance to Quarter-finals	1–2	—	2–0	3–0
3	(Uruguay) Nacional	6	3	1	2	8	5	+3	10		4–1	0–0	—	2–0
4	(Paraguay) Olimpia	6	0	0	6	0	13	−13	0		0–2	0–2	0–2	—

Source: CONMEBOL
Notes:
21 July 2001

Flamengo (Brazil)	2–0	(Uruguay) Nacional
Reinaldo 34', 76'	Report

Estádio Mané Garrincha, Brasília, Brazil
Referee: (Argentina) Daniel Giménez

28 July 2001

Nacional (Uruguay)	2–0	(Paraguay) Olimpia
Núñez 46'; Coelho 80'	Report

Estadio Centenario, Montevideo, Uruguay
Referee: (Ecuador) Mauricio Reinoso

28 July 2001

San Lorenzo (Argentina)	1–2	(Brazil) Flamengo
Romeo 75'	Report	Juan 52'; Edílson 57'

Estadio Pedro Bidegain, Buenos Aires, Argentina
Referee: (Chile) Pablo Pozo

31 July 2001

Olimpia (Paraguay)	0–2	(Argentina) San Lorenzo
	Report	Romeo 58'; Acosta 69'

Estadio Defensores del Chaco, Asunción, Paraguay
Referee: (Brazil) Paulo César de Oliveira

8 August 2001

San Lorenzo (Argentina)	2–0	(Uruguay) Nacional
Romeo 59'; Acosta 71'	Report

Estadio Pedro Bidegain, Buenos Aires, Argentina
Referee: (Chile) Mario Sánchez

21 August 2001

Flamengo (Brazil)	2–0 (awd)	(Paraguay) Olimpia

11 September 2001

Nacional (Uruguay)	4–1	(Brazil) Flamengo
Gutiérrez 14', 54'; Morales 75'; Cardozo 81'	Report	Reinaldo 24'

Estadio Centenario, Montevideo, Uruguay
Referee: (Argentina) Horacio Elizondo

20 September 2001

San Lorenzo (Argentina)	3–0	(Paraguay) Olimpia
Romagnoli 8', 64'; Romeo 87'	Report

Estadio Pedro Bidegain, Buenos Aires, Argentina
Referee: (Brazil) Wilson Souza Mendonça

27 September 2001

Flamengo (Brazil)	2–1	(Argentina) San Lorenzo
Juan 23'; Petković 38'	Report	Acosta 75'

Serejão, Taguatinga, Brazil
Referee: (Paraguay) Ubaldo Aquino

3 October 2001

Olimpia (Paraguay)	0–2	(Uruguay) Nacional
	Report	Gutiérrez 6', 83'

Estadio Manuel Ferreira, Asunción, Paraguay
Referee: (Brazil) Luciano Almeida

16 October 2001

Nacional (Uruguay)	0–0	(Argentina) San Lorenzo
	Report

Estadio Centenario, Montevideo, Uruguay
Referee: (Paraguay) Epifanio González

18 October 2001

Olimpia (Paraguay)	0–2	(Brazil) Flamengo
	Report	Roma 31', 41'

Estadio Defensores del Chaco, Asunción, Paraguay
Referee: (Chile) Carlos Chandía

=== Group C ===
Pos	Team	Pld	W	D	L	GF	GA	GD	Pts	Qualification	(Brazil) COR	(Argentina) IND	(Brazil) CRU	(Chile) COL
1	(Brazil) Corinthians	6	3	1	2	8	6	+2	10	Advance to Quarter-finals	—	2–1	2–4	0–0
2	(Argentina) Independiente	6	3	0	3	8	8	0	9	Advance to Quarter-finals	1–0	—	2–0	2–0
3	(Brazil) Cruzeiro	6	2	2	2	9	8	+1	8		0–2	4–1	—	1–1
4	(Chile) Colo Colo	6	1	3	2	3	6	−3	6		0–2	2–1	0–0	—

Source: CONMEBOL
24 July 2001

Independiente (Argentina)	2–0	(Brazil) Cruzeiro
Ramírez 41'; Montenegro 93+'	Report

Estadio de Independiente, Avellaneda, Argentina
Referee: (Paraguay) Robert Troxler

26 July 2001

Colo Colo (Chile)	0–2	(Brazil) Corinthians
	Report	Ricardinho 28'; Gil 55'

Estadio Monumental, Santiago, Chile
Referee: (Argentina) Claudio Martín

29 July 2001

Corinthians (Brazil)	2–1	(Argentina) Independiente
Gil 12'; Scheidt 32'	Report	Vuoso 88'

Estádio Paulo Machado de Carvalho, São Paulo, Brazil
Referee: (Chile) Guido Aros

29 July 2001

Cruzeiro (Brazil)	1–1	(Chile) Colo Colo
Sorín 49'	Report	Tapia 63'

Estádio Governador Magalhães Pinto, Belo Horizonte, Brazil
Referee: (Argentina) Sergio Pezzotta

22 August 2001

Cruzeiro (Brazil)	0–2	(Brazil) Corinthians
	Report	Ricardinho 1'; Rogério 55'

Estádio Municipal Epaminondas Mendes Brito, Ipatinga, Brazil
Referee: (Brazil) Carlos Eugênio Simon

23 August 2001

Colo Colo (Chile)	2–1	(Argentina) Independiente
Tapia 6'; Villaseca 74'	Report	Galván 72'

Estadio Monumental, Santiago, Chile
Referee: (Paraguay) Carlos Amarilla

11 September 2001

Cruzeiro (Brazil)	4–1	(Argentina) Independiente
Edmundo 10', 24' (pen.), 90'; Oséas 35'	Report	Galván 51'

Estádio Governador Magalhães Pinto, Belo Horizonte, Brazil
Referee: (Paraguay) Carlos Torres

12 September 2001

Corinthians (Brazil)	0–0	(Chile) Colo Colo
	Report

Estádio Paulo Machado de Carvalho, São Paulo, Brazil
Referee: (Argentina) Gabriel Brazenas

26 September 2001

Colo Colo (Chile)	0–0	(Brazil) Cruzeiro
	Report

Estadio Monumental, Santiago, Chile
Referee: (Argentina) Oscar Sequeira

27 September 2001

Independiente (Argentina)	1–0	(Brazil) Corinthians
Montenegro 38'	Report

Estadio de Independiente, Avellaneda, Argentina
Referee: (Paraguay) Epifanio González

17 October 2001

Independiente (Argentina)	2–0	(Chile) Colo Colo
Forlán 49', 70'	Report

Estadio de Independiente, Avellaneda, Argentina
Referee: (Brazil) Wilson Souza Mendonça

17 October 2001

Corinthians (Brazil)	2–4	(Brazil) Cruzeiro
Anderson 61'; Edson Di 74'	Report	Jorge Wagner 29'; Leonardo 55', 87'; Jussiê 90'

Estádio Paulo Machado de Carvalho, São Paulo, Brazil
Referee: (Brazil) Wagner Tardelli

=== Group D ===
Pos	Team	Pld	W	D	L	GF	GA	GD	Pts	Qualification	(Argentina) TAL	(Argentina) VEL	(Brazil) SPA	(Uruguay) PEÑ
1	(Argentina) Talleres	6	2	4	0	10	5	+5	10	Advance to Quarterfinals	—	2–2	0–0	1–1
2	(Argentina) Vélez Sársfield	6	2	2	2	12	11	+1	8		1–4	—	4–2	3–0
3	(Brazil) São Paulo	6	1	4	1	7	6	+1	7		0–0	1–1	—	3–0
4	(Uruguay) Peñarol	6	1	2	3	5	12	−7	5		1–3	2–1	1–1	—

Source: RSSSF.com
25 July 2001

São Paulo (Brazil)	3–0	(Uruguay) Peñarol
Luís Fabiano 5', 6'; Jean 84'

Estádio Cícero Pompeu de Toledo, São Paulo, Brazil
Referee: (Argentina) Oscar Sequeira

28 July 2001

Talleres (Argentina)	0–0	(Brazil) São Paulo

Estadio Olímpico, Córdoba, Argentina
Referee: (Chile) Carlos Chandía

29 July 2001

Peñarol (Uruguay)	2–1	(Argentina) Vélez Sársfield
Romero 16'; Rodríguez 88'		Téllez 77'

Estadio Centenario, Montevideo, Uruguay
Referee: (Brazil) Antônio Pereira da Silva

2 August 2001

Vélez Sársfield (Argentina)	1–4	(Argentina) Talleres
Camps 7' (pen.)		Cuba 1'; Maidana 10'; Urbano 65', 90'

José Amalfitani Stadium, Buenos Aires, Argentina
Referee: (Argentina) Gabriel Brazenas

23 August 2001

São Paulo (Brazil)	1–1	(Argentina) Vélez Sársfield
França 70'		Domínguez 63'

Estádio Cícero Pompeu de Toledo, São Paulo, Brazil
Referee: (Paraguay) Epifanio González

23 August 2001

Talleres (Argentina)	1–1	(Uruguay) Peñarol
Cuenca 26' (pen.)		García 79'

Estadio Olímpico, Córdoba, Argentina
Referee: (Chile) Rubén Selman

11 September 2001

Talleres (Argentina)	2–2	(Argentina) Vélez Sársfield
Cuba 65'; Albornós 88'		Domínguez 26'; Gracián 38'

Estadio Olímpico, Córdoba, Argentina
Referee: (Argentina) Ángel Sánchez

12 September 2001

Peñarol (Uruguay)	1–1	(Brazil) São Paulo
Bengoechea 90'		França 75'

Estadio Centenario, Montevideo, Uruguay
Referee: (Argentina) Claudio Martín

18 September 2001

Vélez Sársfield (Argentina)	3–0	(Uruguay) Peñarol
Gutiérrez 65'; Gracián 80'; Domínguez 85'

José Amalfitani Stadium, Buenos Aires, Argentina
Referee: (Paraguay) Ubaldo Aquino

26 September 2001

São Paulo (Brazil)	0–0	(Argentina) Talleres

Estádio Cícero Pompeu de Toledo, São Paulo, Brazil
Referee: (Paraguay) Carlos Torres

17 October 2001

Peñarol (Uruguay)	1–3	(Argentina) Talleres
Pintos 82'		Cuba 16', 44', 73'

Estadio Centenario, Montevideo, Uruguay
Referee: (Paraguay) Ubaldo Aquino

17 October 2001

Vélez Sársfield (Argentina)	4–2	(Brazil) São Paulo
Gracián 2', 55'; Fuentes 23'; Husaín 65'		França 15'; Araújo 71'

José Amalfitani Stadium, Buenos Aires, Argentina
Referee: (Paraguay) Carlos Torres

=== Group E ===
Pos	Team	Pld	W	D	L	GF	GA	GD	Pts	Qualification	(Brazil) GRE	(Argentina) RIV	(Brazil) PAL	(Chile) UNI
1	(Brazil) Grêmio	6	4	2	0	11	4	+7	14	Advance to Quarterfinals	—	1–0	3–1	2–0
2	(Argentina) River Plate	6	2	2	2	13	10	+3	8		2–4	—	3–3	3–0
3	(Brazil) Palmeiras	6	1	3	2	11	10	+1	6		0–0	2–2	—	4–0
4	Universidad de Chile	6	1	1	4	3	14	−11	4		1–1	0–3	2–1	—

Source: RSSSF.com
22 July 2001

River Plate (Argentina)	2–4	(Brazil) Grêmio
Cambiasso 34'; Ortega 66' (pen.)		Lima 8'; Tinga 54'; Polga 80'; Zinho 89'

Estadio Monumental Antonio Vespucio Liberti, Buenos Aires, Argentina
Referee: (Paraguay) Carlos Torres

25 July 2001

Universidad de Chile	2–1	(Brazil) Palmeiras
Tampe 45'; Garrido 53'		Arce 25'

Estadio Nacional, Santiago, Chile
Referee: (Ecuador) Byron Moreno

28 July 2001

Palmeiras (Brazil)	2–2	(Argentina) River Plate
Muñoz 11'; Lopes Tigrão 29'		Garcé 53'; Cardetti 86'

Estádio Palestra Itália, São Paulo, Brazil
Referee: (Paraguay) Carlos Amarilla

28 July 2001

Grêmio (Brazil)	2–0	Universidad de Chile
Zinho 22'; Gral 55'

Estádio Olímpico, Porto Alegre, Brazil
Referee: (Argentina) Héctor Baldassi

22 August 2001

Grêmio (Brazil)	3–1	(Brazil) Palmeiras
Zinho 30', 38'; Marinho 62'		Leonardo 73'

Estádio Olímpico, Porto Alegre, Brazil
Referee: (Brazil) Wilson Souza Mendonça

13 September 2001

Palmeiras (Brazil)	4–0	Universidad de Chile
Galeano 9'; Tuta 33'; Magrão 59'; Alexandre 65'

Estádio Palestra Itália, São Paulo, Brazil
Referee: (Argentina) Héctor Baldassi

13 September 2001

Grêmio (Brazil)	1–0	(Argentina) River Plate
Polga 51'

Estádio Olímpico, Porto Alegre, Brazil
Referee: (Paraguay) Epifanio González

20 September 2001

Universidad de Chile	0–3	(Argentina) River Plate
		Cavenaghi 21', 47'; Álvarez 50'

Estadio Nacional, Santiago, Chile
Referee: (Ecuador) Roger Zambrano

26 September 2001

River Plate (Argentina)	3–3	(Brazil) Palmeiras
Cardetti 36', 38'; Álvarez 50'		Lopes Tigrão 48' (pen.); Basílio 73'; Magrão 88'

Estadio Monumental Antonio Vespucio Liberti, Buenos Aires, Argentina
Referee: (Chile) Carlos Chandía

27 September 2001

Universidad de Chile	1–1	(Brazil) Grêmio
Barrera 17'		Pitbull 22'

Estadio Santa Laura, Santiago, Chile
Referee: (Bolivia) René Ortubé

16 October 2001

River Plate (Argentina)	3–0	Universidad de Chile
Yepes 26', 46'; Álvarez 88'

Estadio Monumental Antonio Vespucio Liberti, Buenos Aires, Argentina
Referee: (Uruguay) Saúl Feldmann

16 October 2001

Palmeiras (Brazil)	0–0	(Brazil) Grêmio

Estádio Palestra Itália, São Paulo, Brazil
Referee: (Brazil) Márcio Rezende de Freitas

=== Ranking of second place teams ===
The three best second-place teams from the five groups advanced to the quarterfinals along with the five group winners.

Pos	Grp	Team	Pld	W	D	L	GF	GA	GD	Pts	Qualification
1	B	(Argentina) San Lorenzo	6	3	1	2	9	4	+5	10	Advance to Quarterfinals
2	C	(Argentina) Independiente	6	3	0	3	8	8	0	9	Advance to Quarterfinals
3	A	(Chile) Universidad Católica	6	3	0	3	8	9	−1	9	Advance to Quarterfinals
4	E	(Argentina) River Plate	6	2	2	2	13	10	+3	8	
5	D	(Argentina) Vélez Sársfield	6	2	2	2	12	11	+1	8	

Source: RSSSF

== Bracket ==
Quarter-finals
(Brazil) Flamengo	0	4	4
(Argentina) Independiente	0	0	0
(Brazil) Grêmio	0	2	2
(Argentina) Talleres	0	0	0
(Brazil) Corinthians	1	2	3
(Chile) Universidad Católica	2	0	2
(Argentina) San Lorenzo	4	2	6
(Paraguay) Cerro Porteño	2	1	3

Semi-finals
(Brazil) Flamengo (p)	2	0	2 (4)
(Brazil) Grêmio	2	0	2 (2)
(Brazil) Corinthians	2	1	3
(Argentina) San Lorenzo	1	4	5

Final
(Brazil) Flamengo	0	1	1 (3)
(Argentina) San Lorenzo (p)	0	1	1 (4)

== Quarter-finals ==
Team 1	Agg.	Team 2	1st leg	2nd leg
Independiente (Argentina)	0–4	(Brazil) Flamengo	0–0	0–4
Universidad Católica (Chile)	2–3	(Brazil) Corinthians	2–1	0–2
San Lorenzo (Argentina)	6–3	(Paraguay) Cerro Porteño	4–2	2–1
Grêmio (Brazil)	2–0	(Argentina) Talleres	0–0	2–0

=== First leg ===
24 October 2001

Independiente (Argentina)	0–0	(Brazil) Flamengo

Estadio de Independiente, Avellaneda, Argentina
Referee: (Paraguay) Carlos Amarilla

24 October 2001

Universidad Católica (Chile)	2–1	(Brazil) Corinthians
Norambuena 42', 90'		Luizão 53'

Estadio San Carlos de Apoquindo, Santiago, Chile
Referee: (Argentina) Daniel Giménez

25 October 2001

San Lorenzo (Argentina)	4–2	(Paraguay) Cerro Porteño
Romeo 10', 19', 25'; Estévez 76'		Aquino 64'; Alvarenga 67'

Estadio Pedro Bidegain, Buenos Aires, Argentina
Referee: (Brazil) Márcio Rezende de Freitas

25 October 2001

Grêmio (Brazil)	0–0	(Argentina) Talleres

Estádio Olímpico, Porto Alegre, Brazil
Referee: (Uruguay) Jorge Larrionda

=== Second leg ===
31 October 2001

Flamengo (Brazil)	4–0	(Argentina) Independiente
Edílson 24', 69'; Juan 25', 35'

Serejão, Taguatinga, Brazil
Referee: (Colombia) Óscar Ruiz

Flamengo won 4–0 on aggregate.

31 October 2001

Corinthians (Brazil)	2–0	(Chile) Universidad Católica
Deivid 59'; Kléber 78'

Estádio Paulo Machado de Carvalho, São Paulo, Brazil
Referee: (Uruguay) Saúl Feldmann

Corinthians won 3–2 on aggregate.

1 November 2001

Cerro Porteño (Paraguay)	1–2	(Argentina) San Lorenzo
Balbuena 26'		Pusineri 68'; Acosta 77'

Estadio General Pablo Rojas, Asunción, Paraguay
Referee: (Uruguay) Jorge Larrionda

San Lorenzo won 6–3 on aggregate.

1 November 2001

Talleres (Argentina)	0–2	(Brazil) Grêmio
		Cardoso 59'; Emerson 90'

Estadio Olímpico, Córdoba, Argentina
Referee: (Paraguay) Epifanio González

Gremio won 2–0 on aggregate.

== Semi-finals ==
Team 1	Agg.	Team 2	1st leg	2nd leg
Corinthians (Brazil)	3–5	(Argentina) San Lorenzo	2–1	1–4
Flamengo (Brazil)	2–2 (4–2 p)	(Brazil) Grêmio	2–2	0–0

=== First leg ===
21 November 2001

Corinthians (Brazil)	2–1	(Argentina) San Lorenzo
Scheidt 65'; Luizão 78'		Romeo 15'

Estádio Paulo Machado de Carvalho, São Paulo, Brazil
Referee: (Chile) Carlos Chandía

22 November 2001

Flamengo (Brazil)	2–2	(Brazil) Grêmio
Juan 5'; Beto 20'		Polga 32'; Baiano 81'

Estádio Jornalista Mário Filho, Rio de Janeiro, Brazil
Referee: (Argentina) Horacio Elizondo

=== Second leg ===
28 November 2001

San Lorenzo (Argentina)	4–1	(Brazil) Corinthians
Romeo 37', 90'; Pusineri 54'; Ângelo 67' (o.g.)		Luizão 77'

Estadio Pedro Bidegain, Buenos Aires, Argentina
Referee: (Paraguay) Carlos Torres

San Lorenzo won 5–3 on aggregate.

29 November 2001

Grêmio (Brazil)	0–0	(Brazil) Flamengo
Penalties
Zinho (penalty scored); Polga (penalty scored); Roger (penalty missed); Luís Mário (penalty missed)	2–4	(penalty scored) Petković; (penalty scored) Reinaldo; (penalty scored) Juan; (penalty scored) Beto

Estádio Olímpico, Porto Alegre, Brazil
Referee: (Colombia) Óscar Ruiz

2–2 on aggregate, Flamengo won 4–2 on penalties

== Final ==
=== First leg ===
12 December 2001

Flamengo (Brazil)	0–0	(Argentina) San Lorenzo

Estádio Jornalista Mário Filho, Rio de Janeiro, Brazil
Referee: (Paraguay) Epifanio González

=== Second leg ===
Originally scheduled for Dec 19 but postponed to January 24, 2002 due to social unrest in Argentina

24 January 2002

San Lorenzo (Argentina)	1–1	(Brazil) Flamengo
Estévez 67'		Machado 10'
Penalties
Acosta (penalty missed); Serrizuela (penalty missed); Romagnoli (penalty scored); Pusineri (penalty scored); Saja (penalty scored); Capria (penalty scored)	4–3	(penalty missed) Juan; (penalty scored) Petković; (penalty scored) Andrezinho; (penalty missed) Cássio; (penalty scored) Edson; (penalty missed) Roma

Estadio Pedro Bidegain, Buenos Aires, Argentina
Referee: (Colombia) Óscar Ruiz

1–1 on aggregate, San Lorenzo won 4–3 on penalties

Copa Mercosur
2001 Winner
(Argentina)
San Lorenzo
First title
