= Eduardo Bonvallet =

Chilean footballer (1955-2015)

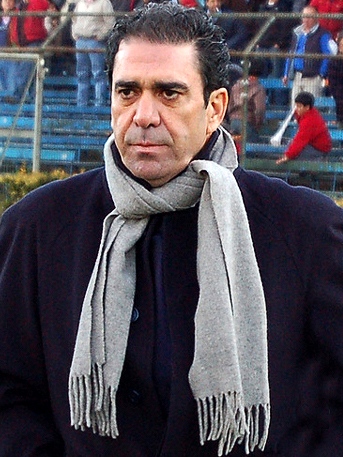
- Bonvallet leading Deportivo Temuco in 2007

Personal information
- Full name: Eduardo Guillermo Bonvallet Godoy
- Date of birth: 13 January 1955
- Place of birth: Santiago, Chile
- Date of death: 18 September 2015 (aged 60)
- Place of death: Santiago, Chile
- Height: 1.81 m (5 ft 11 in)
- Position: Defensive midfielder

Youth career
- 1968–1972: Universidad de Chile

Senior career*
Years	Team	Apps	(Gls)
1972–1974	Universidad de Chile	36	(4)
1975–1977	Universidad Católica	46	(5)
1978–1979	O'Higgins	46	(5)
1980	Fort Lauderdale Strikers	16	(2)
1981–1982	Universidad Católica	48	(2)
1983	Tampa Bay Rowdies	11	(0)
1983	Unión San Felipe	14	(0)
Total		217	(18)

International career
1979–1982	Chile	24	(0)

Managerial career
- 2002–2007: Universidad Gabriela Mistral
- 2007: Deportivo Temuco
- 2010: Sportverein Jugendland
- * Club domestic league appearances and goals

Eduardo Guillermo Bonvallet Godoy (13 January 1955 – 18 September 2015) was a Chilean footballer who played as a defensive midfielder and later developed a sportscasting career.

He was best known for his strong and rather harsh commentaries on Chilean football players, coaches, and managerial structures. Bonvallet repeatedly put himself forward for the position of coach of the national team. He also had experience coaching university-level teams, such as Universidad Gabriela Mistral.

== Playing career ==
=== Club ===
He played for local giants Universidad de Chile and Universidad Católica and had spells in the NASL with the Tampa Bay Rowdies and the Fort Lauderdale Strikers.

=== International ===
Bonvallet made his international debut in 1979, earning a total of 24 caps without scoring. He represented his country in one FIFA World Cup qualification match and played in three games at the 1982 FIFA World Cup.

== Managerial career ==
In 2007, Bonvallet was appointed manager of Deportivo Temuco (owned by Nehuen S.A.). The club was struggling, having lost many games before Bonvallet took charge. This was his first opportunity to manage a professional team in the second division, but success eluded him, and Temuco was relegated to the Chilean third division.

In 2010, he assumed the role of coach of Sportverein Jugendland Fussball from Peñaflor in the Chilean Tercera B, with Kormac Valdebenito as the sports manager.

== Media career ==
Bonvallet also coined many insulting words and phrases in Chilean Spanish, which became popular on his TVO Channel show thanks to the involuntary help of another show, Caiga Quién Caiga. Some of his notorious phrases were:

- ¡Avíspate re-huevón! (React, dumbass!)
- ¡Desconchetumadrízate! (Un-motherfucker-ize yourself!)
- ¡Ahuevonado al máximo! (Dumbass to the max!)
- ¡Feo, mamón y no sabís nada! (Ugly! Pussy! And you don't know anything!)
- ¡Grita huevón, grita! (Scream idiot! Scream!)
- ¡O eres monje, fakir o guerrero, o sencillamente te pierdes! (You must be either a monk, a fakir, or a warrior, or you will simply lose your way!)
- ¡Tienen que comer carne! (They have to eat meat!)

He faced trial several times for publicly insulting managers, politicians, businessmen, etc. During his final years, he earned considerable support, proclaiming himself "El gurú" ("The Guru").

== Titles ==
Season	Club	Title
1975	Universidad Católica	Primera B de Chile

== Personal life and death ==
His son, Jean Pierre, played football at a professional level as a midfielder for both Santiago Wanderers and Unión San Felipe and has pursued a career in the media and on social networks like his father. His daughter, Daniela, is a journalist who was elected to the municipal council of Ñuñoa, Santiago, in 2021.

In June 2008, a physical altercation was reported between Bonvallet and former Chilean footballer Carlos Caszely. The incident took place at an ice cream shop in the commune of Las Condes, Santiago, Chile. Witnesses reported that a fistfight broke out after the two exchanged words.

In 2011, Bonvallet was diagnosed with stomach cancer. However, in late 2012, he announced he had beaten the illness but was required to undergo chemotherapy for at least another year.

On 18 September 2015, Bonvallet was found dead by hanging, having used a belt, in the kitchen of room 213 at the Nogales Hotel. Local news reported that he was suffering from depression.

On 15 April 2026, a four-episode biographical podcast called BONVALLET, GENIO Y SOMBRA (Bonvallet, Genius and Shadow) was released.
