= 2000 Supertaça Cândido de Oliveira =

- Event: Supertaça Cândido de Oliveira (Portuguese Super Cup)
Porto	Sporting CP
0	1
- Sporting CP won the replay 1–0, after 1–1 aggregate score over the two legs.

First leg
Porto	Sporting CP
1	1
- Date: 13 August 2000
- Venue: Estádio das Antas, Porto
- Referee: José Pratas (Évora)

Second leg
Sporting CP	Porto
0	0
- Date: 31 January 2001
- Venue: Estádio José Alvalade, Lisbon
- Referee: António Costa (Lisbon)

The 2000 Supertaça Cândido de Oliveira was the 22nd edition of the Supertaça Cândido de Oliveira, the annual Portuguese football season-opening match contested by the winners of the previous season's top league and cup competitions (or cup runner-up in case the league- and cup-winning club is the same). The 2000 Supertaça Cândido de Oliveira was contested over two legs, and opposed Porto and Sporting CP of the Primeira Liga. Porto qualified for the SuperCup by winning the 1999–2000 Taça de Portugal, whilst Sporting CP qualified for the Supertaça by winning the 1999–2000 Primeira Liga.

The first leg which took place at the Estádio das Antas, saw 1–1 scoreline. The second leg which took place at the Estádio José Alvalade finished goalless (1–1 on aggregate), which led to the Supertaça being replayed in May 2001. The replay which took place at the Estádio Municipal de Coimbra, saw the Leões defeat the Dragões 1–0 thanks to Alberto Acosta goal which would claim the Leões a fourth Supertaça.

== First leg ==
=== Details ===
13 August 2000

Porto	1–1	Sporting CP
Alenichev 89'		Acosta 60'

Estádio das Antas, Porto
Attendance: José Pratas (Évora)

Porto	Sporting CP

GK	55	(Russia) Sergei Ovchinnikov
RB	3	(Portugal) Fernando Nélson
CB	2	(Portugal) Jorge Costa (c)
CB	33	(Portugal) Ricardo Silva
CB	22	(Brazil) Rubens Júnior
RM	25	(Portugal) Cândido Costa		(substituted off) 72'
CM	18	(Portugal) Carlos Chaínho		(substituted off) 72'
CM	20	(Portugal) Paulinho Santos	(red card) 83'
LM	15	(Russia) Dmitri Alenichev
SS	11	(Federal Republic of Yugoslavia) Ljubinko Drulović
CF	9	(Portugal) Domingos		(substituted off) 79'
Substitutes:
MF	8	(Slovenia) Miran Pavlin		(substituted on) 72'
MF	28	(Brazil) Clayton		(substituted on) 79'
FW	27	(Portugal) Romeu		(substituted on) 72'
Manager:
(Portugal) Fernando Santos

GK	1	(Denmark) Peter Schmeichel
RB	29	(Brazil) César Prates
CB	22	(Portugal) Beto (c)
CB	50	(Brazil) André Cruz
LB	23	(Portugal) Rui Jorge
CM	13	(Czech Republic) Pavel Horváth
CM	17	(Portugal) Paulo Bento
CM	18	(Portugal) Bino
AM	10	(Brazil) Edmílson	(substituted off) 84'
AM	25	(Portugal) João Pinto	(substituted off) 89'
CF	11	(Argentina) Alberto Acosta
Substitutes:
DF	3	(Portugal) Dimas	(substituted on) 89'
FW	48	(Belgium) Mbo Mpenza	(substituted on) 84'
Manager:
(Portugal) Augusto Inácio

Match officials

- Assistant referees:
- Fourth official:

Match rules

- 90 minutes.
- Maximum of three substitutions

== Second leg ==
=== Details ===
31 January 2001

Sporting CP	0–0	Porto

Estádio José Alvalade, Lisbon
Referee: António Costa (Lisbon)

Sporting CP	Porto

GK	1	(Denmark) Peter Schmeichel
RB	2	(Portugal) Quim Berto
CB	22	(Portugal) Beto	(substituted off) 46'
CB	50	(Brazil) André Cruz
LB	23	(Portugal) Rui Jorge
RM	25	(Portugal) João Pinto
CM	8	(Portugal) Pedro Barbosa (c)	(substituted off) 80'
CM	17	(Portugal) Paulo Bento
LM	20	(Chile) Rodrigo Tello
CF	11	(Argentina) Alberto Acosta
CF	48	(Belgium) Mbo Mpenza	(substituted off) 57'
Substitutes:
MF	13	(Czech Republic) Pavel Horváth	(substituted on) 46'
MF	14	(Spain) Toñito	(substituted on) 80'
FW	19	(United States) Jovan Kirovski	(substituted on) 57'
Manager:
(Portugal) Manuel Fernandes

GK	44	(Portugal) Pedro Espinha
RB	22	(Brazil) Rubens Júnior		(substituted off) 57'
CB	4	(Brazil) Aloísio (c)
CB	13	(Portugal) Jorge Andrade
LB	30	(Brazil) Esquerdinha
CM	20	(Portugal) Paulinho Santos	(yellow card) 2' (yellow-red card) 54'
CM	5	(Paraguay) Carlos Paredes
CM	10	(Brazil) Deco
CM	15	(Russia) Dmitri Alenichev
LM	23	(Croatia) Silvio Marić		(substituted off) 57'
CF	21	(Portugal) Capucho		(substituted off) 89'
Substitutes:
MF	6	(Portugal) Emílio Peixe		(substituted on) 57'
MF	25	(Portugal) Cândido Costa		(substituted on) 89'
FW	31	(Brazil) Pena		(substituted on) 57'
Manager:
(Portugal) Fernando Santos

== Replay ==
=== Details ===
16 May 2001

Porto	0–1	Sporting CP
		Acosta 31'

Coimbra Municipal Stadium, Coimbra
Referee: Isidoro Rodrigues (Viseu)

Porto	Sporting CP

GK	55	(Russia) Sergei Ovchinnikov
RB	7	(Portugal) Carlos Secretário
CB	2	(Portugal) Jorge Costa (c)	(red card) 75'
CB	13	(Portugal) Jorge Andrade
LB	3	(Portugal) Fernando Nélson		(substituted off) 83'
CM	5	(Paraguay) Carlos Paredes
AM	10	(Brazil) Deco
AM	28	(Brazil) Clayton
RW	21	(Portugal) Capucho
LW	29	(Portugal) António Folha		(substituted off) 55'
CF	31	(Brazil) Pena
Substitutes:
MF	25	(Portugal) Cândido Costa		(substituted on) 83'
FW	27	(Portugal) Romeu		(substituted on) 55'
Manager:
(Portugal) Fernando Santos

GK	1	(Denmark) Peter Schmeichel
RB	29	(Brazil) César Prates
CB	15	(Portugal) Hugo		(substituted off) 68'
CB	22	(Portugal) Beto	(red card) 73'
CB	50	(Brazil) André Cruz
LB	23	(Portugal) Rui Jorge
CM	8	(Portugal) Pedro Barbosa (c)
CM	17	(Portugal) Paulo Bento
AM	25	(Portugal) João Pinto
SS	7	(Portugal) Ricardo Sá Pinto		(substituted off) 85'
CF	11	(Argentina) Alberto Acosta		(substituted off) 75'
Substitutes:
DF	5	(Republic of Ireland) Phil Babb		(substituted on) 68'
MF	13	(Czech Republic) Pavel Horváth		(substituted on) 85'
FW	28	(Brazil) Rodrigo Fabri		(substituted on) 75'
Manager:
(Portugal) Manuel Fernandes

Match officials

- Assistant referees:
- Fourth official:

Match rules

- 90 minutes.
- 30 minutes of extra time if necessary.
- Penalty shoot-out if scores still level.
- Maximum of three substitutions

2000 Supertaça Cândido de Oliveira Winners
Sporting CP
4th Title

== See also ==
- FC Porto–Sporting CP rivalry
- 2000–01 Primeira Liga
- 2000–01 Taça de Portugal
- 2000–01 Sporting CP season
