= 1995 Copa Chile =

Tournament details
- Country: Chile

Final positions
- Champions: Universidad Católica
- Runners-up: Cobreloa

Tournament statistics
- Top goal scorer: Alberto Acosta (10 goals)

The 1995 Copa Chile was the 25th edition of the Chilean Cup tournament. The competition started on February 11, 1995, and concluded on September 14, 1995. Universidad Católica won the competition for their fourth time, beating Cobreloa 4–2 in the final.

== Calendar ==
| Round | Date |
|---|---|
| Group Round | 11 February 1995; 22 March 1995 |
| Second round | 10–17 May 1995 |
| Quarterfinals | 1–15 August 1995 |
| Semi-finals | 22–30 August 1995 |
| Final | 14 September 1995 |

== Group Round ==
Key to colours in group tables
Teams that progressed to the Quarterfinals
Teams that progressed to the second round

=== Group 1A ===
| | DANT | RATA | CLOA | UCAT |
|---|---|---|---|---|
| D. Antofagasta | | 1–2 | 3–1 | 1–1 |
| R. Atacama | 3–2 | | 1–1 | 2–3 |
| Cobreloa | 2–0 | 4–0 | | 2–3 |
| U. Católica | 3–0 | 4–0 | 2–1 | |

| Rank | Team | Points |
| 1 | Universidad Católica | 16 |
| 2 | Cobreloa | 7 |
| 3 | Regional Atacama | 7 |
| 4 | Deportes Antofagasta | 4 |

=== Group 2A ===
| | UCHI | UESP | DLSR | COQU |
|---|---|---|---|---|
| U. de Chile | | 1–0 | 2–0 | 5–0 |
| U. Española | 1–2 | | 0–1 | 2–0 |
| D. La Serena | 0–0 | 1–1 | | 2–1 |
| Coquimbo U. | 1–0 | 1–1 | 1–0 | |

| Rank | Team | Points |
| 1 | Universidad de Chile | 13 |
| 2 | Deportes La Serena | 8 |
| 3 | Coquimbo Unido | 7 |
| 4 | Unión Española | 5 |

=== Group 3A ===
| | COLO | OHIG | EVER | PALE |
|---|---|---|---|---|
| Colo-Colo | | 3–1 | 7–1 | 1–0 |
| O'Higgins | 1–1 | | 2–2 | 1–1 |
| Everton | 1–2 | 0–0 | | 3–2 |
| Palestino | 2–3 | 2–3 | 0–1 | |

| Rank | Team | Points |
| 1 | Colo-Colo | 16 |
| 2 | Everton | 8 |
| 3 | O'Higgins | 7 |
| 4 | Palestino | 1 |

=== Group 4A ===
| | DTEM | POSO | DCON | HUAC |
|---|---|---|---|---|
| D. Temuco | | 2–1 | 0–2 | 1–1 |
| P. Osorno | 0–2 | | 0–2 | 0–1 |
| D. Concepción | 1–3 | 1–1 | | 2–1 |
| Huachipato | 4–2 | 2–1 | 1–1 | |

| Rank | Team | Points |
| 1 | Deportes Concepción | 11 |
| 2 | Huachipato | 11 |
| 3 | Deportes Temuco | 10 |
| 4 | Provincial Osorno | 1 |

=== Group 1B ===
| | DARI | DIQU | CSAL | DOVA |
|---|---|---|---|---|
| D. Arica | | 0–1 | 0–2 | 3–1 |
| D. Iquique | 3–1 | | 0–2 | 2–1 |
| Cobresal | 4–2 | 5–2 | | 1–0 |
| D. Ovalle | 2–0 | 0–0 | 1–1 | |

| Rank | Team | Points |
| 1 | Cobresal | 16 |
| 2 | Deportes Iquique | 10 |
| 3 | Deportes Ovalle | 5 |
| 4 | Deportes Arica | 3 |

=== Group 2B ===
| | SWAN | ULCA | USFE | AUDI |
|---|---|---|---|---|
| S. Wanderers | | 4–0 | 2–1 | 4–1 |
| U. La Calera | 0–5 | | 1–3 | 0–1 |
| U. San Felipe | 1–3 | 3–0 | | 1–1 |
| Audax I. | 1–1 | 2–0 | 0–0 | |

| Rank | Team | Points |
| 1 | Santiago Wanderers | 16 |
| 2 | Audax Italiano | 9 |
| 3 | Unión San Felipe | 8 |
| 4 | Unión La Calera | 0 |

=== Group 3B ===
| | DMEL | DCOL | USCR | RANG |
|---|---|---|---|---|
| D. Melipilla | | 1–0 | 1–1 | 2–2 |
| D. Colchagua | 4–3 | | 4–1 | 3–0 |
| U. Santa Cruz | 1–1 | 0–1 | | 0–0 |
| Rangers | 1–1 | 1–1 | 1–0 | |

| Rank | Team | Points |
| 1 | Deportes Colchagua | 13 |
| 2 | Deportes Melipilla | 7 |
| 3 | Rangers | 7 |
| 4 | Unión Santa Cruz | 3 |

=== Group 4B ===
| | DLIN | ÑUBL | FVIA | DPMO |
|---|---|---|---|---|
| D. Linares | | 1–1 | 1–1 | 2–2 |
| Ñublense | 2–0 | | 4–2 | 1–1 |
| Fernández Vial | 3–1 | 4–0 | | 0–0 |
| D. Puerto Montt | 0–1 | 1–2 | 2–2 | |

| Rank | Team | Points |
| 1 | Ñublense | 11 |
| 2 | Fernández Vial | 9 |
| 3 | Deportes Linares | 6 |
| 4 | Deportes Puerto Montt | 4 |

== Second round ==
| Team 1 | Agg. | Team 2 | 1st leg | 2nd leg |
|---|---|---|---|---|
| Cobresal | 3–6 | Cobreloa | 1–1 | 2–5 |
| Santiago Wanderers | 2–3 | Deportes La Serena | 0–2 | 2–1 |
| Deportes Colchagua | 4–6 | Everton | 2–1 | 2–5 |
| Ñublense | 4–3 | Huachipato | 2–1 | 2–2 |

== Quarterfinals ==
| Team 1 | Agg. | Team 2 | 1st leg | 2nd leg |
|---|---|---|---|---|
| Deportes La Serena | 3–6 | Universidad Católica | 1–5 | 2–1 |
| Everton | 1–6 | Deportes Concepción | 0–2 | 1–4 |
| Cobreloa | 4–3 | Universidad de Chile | 3–2 | 1–1 |
| Ñublense | 4–4 (a) | Colo-Colo | 2–0 | 2–4 |

== Semifinals ==
August 22, 1995

| Ñublense | 1 – 3 | Universidad Católica |
|---|---|---|
| Valdir P. 66' | | Acosta 4' (pen.); Barrera 42'; Tudor 60' |

Estadio Nelson Oyarzun, Chillán
Attendance: 12,000
Referee: E. Marin

August 23, 1995

| Cobreloa | 3 – 1 | Deportes Concepción |
|---|---|---|
| Glaría 39', 52', 90' | | F. Pérez 76' |

Estadio Municipal, Calama
Attendance: 2,627
Referee: J. Toro

August 29, 1995

| Deportes Concepción | 1 – 0 | Cobreloa |
|---|---|---|
| Guajardo 75' |

Estadio Municipal, Concepción
Attendance: 8,436
Referee: I. Guerrero

August 30, 1995

| Universidad Católica | 5 – 2 | Ñublense |
|---|---|---|
| Acosta 27' (pen.), 34', 36', 67', 86' | | Valdir P. 4', 66' |

Estadio San Carlos de Apoquindo, Santiago
Attendance: 3,051
Referee: N. Mondria

== Final ==
September 14, 1995

| Universidad Católica | 4 – 2 | Cobreloa |
|---|---|---|
| Acosta 7'; Rozental 17'; Barrera 60'; M. Rojas 66' (o.g.) | | Miranda 22'; P. González 44' |

Estadio Nacional, Santiago
Attendance: 8,328
Referee: E. Gamboa

== Top goalscorer ==
- Alberto Acosta (U. Católica) 10 goals

== See also ==
- 1995 Campeonato Nacional
- Primera B
