= Mbo Mpenza =

Belgian football coach and former player (born 1976)

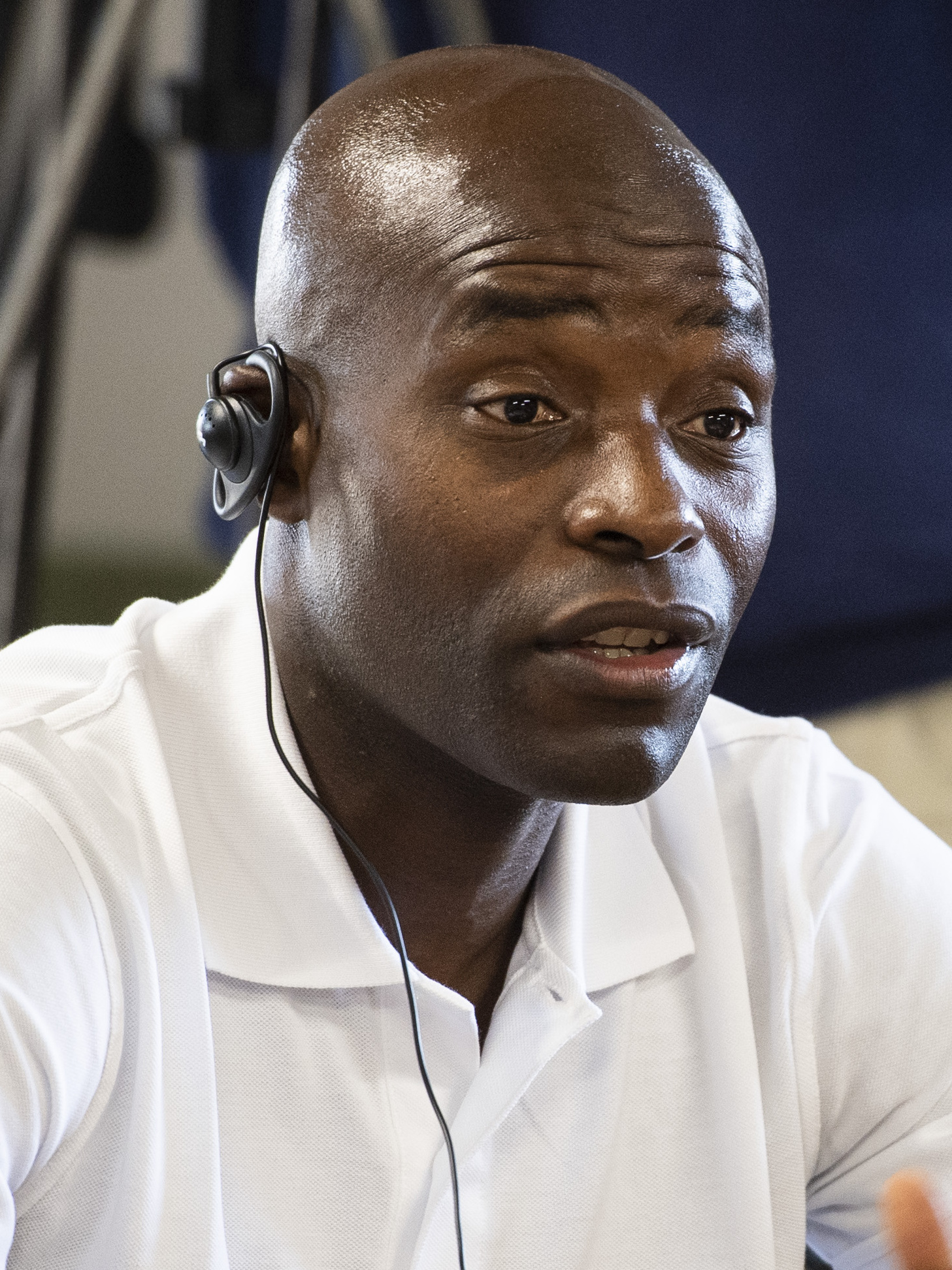
- Mpenza in 2020

Personal information
- Full name: Mbo Jérôme Mpenza
- Date of birth: 4 December 1976 (age 49)
- Place of birth: Kinshasa, Zaire
- Height: 1.75 m (5 ft 9 in)
- Position: Striker

Youth career
- Mesvins
- 1989–1993: Kortrijk

Senior career*
Years	Team	Apps	(Gls)
1993–1996	Kortrijk	73	(34)
1996–1997	Mouscron	30	(12)
1997–1999	Standard Liège	52	(20)
2000–2001	Sporting CP	35	(3)
2001	Galatasaray	0	(0)
2002–2004	Mouscron	62	(27)
2004–2008	Anderlecht	86	(20)
2008	AEL	0	(0)
Total		338	(116)

International career
1991	Belgium U15	1	(0)
1992	Belgium U16	1	(0)
1992	Belgium U17	4	(3)
1994	Belgium U18	1	(0)
1996	Belgium U21	2	(0)
1997–2007	Belgium	56	(3)

Managerial career
- 2009: Anderlecht (scout)
- 2009: Anderlecht U13
- 2011–: Belgium (scout)
- * Club domestic league appearances and goals

Mbo Jérôme Mpenza (born 4 December 1976) is a Belgian former professional football player and coach, who played as a striker. He was capped by Belgium at international level, scoring three goals in 56 appearances. His younger brother, Émile, is also a former footballer who represented Belgium.

== Club career ==
During the start of his career, Mbo shared clubs with Émile, until he eventually left Standard Liège for Sporting CP, where he won the 2000 league championship as a January transfer. He was once nicknamed Monsieur Un But Par Match (Mr. One-Goal-A-Match) for his regular club scoring exploits. Had an uneventful stint in Turkey, playing almost no part in Galatasaray's season during the first part of 2001–02. He subsequently returned to Belgium, and served second stints with R.E. Mouscron (one half season) and R.S.C. Anderlecht (four).

In July 2008, Mpenza joined Greek Super League club, AEL. On 8 December 2008, he announced his retirement due to a back-injury. At this time he had not played a game for the club yet, due to the same injury.

== International career ==
Mpenza also played for the Belgium national team from 1997, for which he scored his first goal in a friendly against Greece in August 2005. He represented his adopted nation in two World Cups and in UEFA Euro 2000, held in his country and the Netherlands (with brother Émile in the final squads for 1998 and 2000's competitions). He collected 56 caps (66 selections).

== After football ==
Mpenza works at Anderlecht as a scout following his retirement.

== Honours ==
Sporting CP

- Portuguese First Division: 1999–2000
- Supertaça Cândido de Oliveira: 2000

Anderlecht

- Belgian First Division: 2005–06, 2006–07
- Belgian Cup: 2007–08
- Belgian Super Cup: 2006, 2007

Belgium

- FIFA Fair Play Trophy: 2002 World Cup
