= Aldo Paredes =

Argentine footballer

Personal information
- Full name: Aldo Gustavo Paredes
- Date of birth: February 7, 1972 (age 54)
- Place of birth: Formosa, Argentina
- Height: 1.78 m (5 ft 10 in)
- Position: Midfielder

Team information
- Current team: Independiente Rivadavia

Youth career
- Boca Juniors

Senior career*
Years	Team	Apps	(Gls)
1994–1995	Boca Juniors	6	(0)
1995–1997	Ferro Carril Oeste	66	(1)
1997–2005	San Lorenzo	207	(3)
2005–2006	Quilmes	23	(0)
2006–2007	Almagro	41	(0)
2008–2009	Independiente Rivadavia	24	(1)
2009–2010	Atletico Policial		
- * Club domestic league appearances and goals

Aldo Gustavo Paredes (born 7 February 1972) is an Argentine retired footballer who played as a midfielder.

Paredes came through the youth team at Boca Juniors to make his professional debut in a 3–0 away win over Racing Club in 1994. He only played six league matches for the club.

In 1995, he joined Ferro Carril Oeste where he played 66 matches over the next two seasons before joining San Lorenzo in 1997.

Paredes enjoyed the most successful part of his career with San Lorenzo, he was part of the team that won the Clausura 2001 championship. He also won two international championships with the club, the 2001 Copa Mercosur and the 2002 Copa Sudamericana, He played a total of 264 games in 9 years with San Lorenzo, putting him in 9th place on the list of all-time appearances for the club.

In 2006, he joined Quilmes for the 2006–07 season but the club finished bottom of the Apertura and the Clausura and were relegated. The following season, he played for Almagro of the 2nd division and he then joined Independiente Rivadavia in 2008.

== Titles ==
Season	Team	Title
Clausura 2001	San Lorenzo	Primera División Argentina
2001	San Lorenzo	Copa Mercosur
2002	San Lorenzo	Copa Sudamericana
