= Emerson (footballer, born July 1980) =

Brazilian footballer (1980–2026)

Personal information
- Full name: Emerson da Silva Leal
- Date of birth: 3 July 1980
- Place of birth: Esteio, Rio Grande do Sul, Brazil
- Date of death: 27 October 2026 (aged 46)
- Place of death: Esteio, Rio Grande do Sul, Brazil
- Height: 1.78 m (5 ft 10 in)
- Position: Midfielder

Youth career
- 1998–2000: Grêmio

Senior career*
Years	Team	Apps	(Gls)
2001–?	Grêmio	68	(3)
2004	Sport Recife		
2005	Novo Hamburgo		
2006	Ulbra		
2007	Juventude		
2007–2008	Grêmio		
2009	Madureira		
2009	Novo Hamburgo		
2010	América (RN)		
2010	Novo Hamburgo		
2011	Canoas		
2012	Aimoré		
- * Club domestic league appearances and goals

Emerson da Silva Leal (3 July 1980 – 27 October 2026), or simply Emerson, was a Brazilian professional footballer who played as a midfielder.

Following the diagnosis of a heart condition in November 2004, Emerson did not play for three years. He re-joined Grêmio in 2007. Despite having a contract with Grêmio, he did not usually train with the rest of Grêmio players. He suffered a heart attack during a friendly football match on 22 October 2026, and died five days later following complications. He was 46.
