= Rodrigo Fabri =

Brazilian footballer

Personal information
- Full name: Rodrigo Fabri
- Date of birth: 15 January 1976 (age 50)
- Place of birth: Santo André, Brazil
- Height: 1.81 m (5 ft 11 1/2 in)
- Position: Attacking midfielder

Youth career
- 1993–1994: Portuguesa

Senior career*
Years	Team	Apps	(Gls)
1995–1997	Portuguesa	58	(26)
1998–2003	Real Madrid	0	(0)
1998	→ Flamengo (loan)	15	(2)
1999	→ Santos (loan)	0	(0)
1999–2000	→ Valladolid (loan)	29	(8)
2000–2001	→ Sporting (loan)	23	(3)
2001–2003	→ Grêmio (loan)	66	(39)
2003–2004	Atlético Madrid	16	(0)
2004–2005	Atlético Mineiro	47	(7)
2006	São Paulo	6	(0)
2007	Paulista	18	(5)
2007–2009	Figueirense	19	(1)
2009	Santo André	16	(1)

International career
1996–1997	Brazil	3	(1)
- * Club domestic league appearances and goals

Rodrigo Fabri (born 15 January 1976 in Santo André) is a Brazilian retired football player, who played as a midfielder or forward.

== Honours ==
Sporting

- Supertaça Cândido de Oliveira: 2000
