= Carlos Garrido (footballer, born 1977) =

Chilean footballer

Personal information
- Full name: Carlos Alberto Garrido Opazo
- Date of birth: January 6, 1977 (age 49)
- Place of birth: Talca, Chile
- Height: 1.81 m (5 ft 11 in)
- Positions: Centre-back; defensive midfielder

Youth career
- Rangers

Senior career*
Years	Team	Apps	(Gls)
1997–2000	Rangers	22	(2)
2001–2003	Universidad de Chile	56	(1)
2004–2005	Rangers	65	(0)
2006–2012	Audax Italiano	197	(12)
2013–2014	Rangers	32	(2)
Total		372	(17)

International career
2006	Chile		
- * Club domestic league appearances and goals

Carlos Alberto Garrido Opazo (born January 6, 1977, in Talca, Chile) is a Chilean former footballer who played as a centre-back.

== Career ==
He began his career playing for his hometown team Rangers in 1997. In 2001, he moved to Universidad de Chile before returning to Rangers for a season. In 2006, he moved to Audax Italiano where he was a regular with the first team, returning to Rangers in 2013. Garrido became the team captain of Audax Italiano at the beginning of 2008 when teammate Carlos Villanueva refused to the post because of a dispute he had with the team's administration. In August 2014, he retired from football due to a thrombophilia detected in 2013. In total, he has more than 200 games in the Chilean Primera División.

At international level, Garrido represented the Chile national team against Aragon on 28 December 2006.

== Post-retirement ==
Garrido served as sporting director of Rangers de Talca for about a year and a half. He has worked for the municipalities of Talca and San Javier as a football instructor and coach at the same time he owns a football academy.

== Honours ==
Audax Italiano

- Liguilla Pre-Sudamericana (1): 2007
