= Hugo (footballer, born 1976) =

Portuguese footballer

Personal information
- Full name: Hugo Miguel Fernandes Vieira
- Date of birth: 11 August 1976 (age 50)
- Place of birth: Braga, Portugal
- Height: 1.82 m (6 ft 0 in)
- Position: Centre back

Youth career
- 1986–1995: Braga

Senior career*
Years	Team	Apps	(Gls)
1995–1997	Braga	15	(0)
1997–2000	Sampdoria	59	(0)
2000–2006	Sporting CP	64	(3)
2006–2009	Vitória Setúbal	33	(1)
2009–2013	Beira-Mar	102	(1)
Total		273	(5)

International career
1994	Portugal U18	4	(0)
- * Club domestic league appearances and goals

Hugo Miguel Fernandes Vieira (born 11 August 1976), known simply as Hugo, is a Portuguese retired footballer who played as a central defender.

He amassed Primeira Liga totals of 186 matches and four goals over 14 seasons, representing in the competition Braga, Sporting, Vitória de Setúbal and Beira-Mar. He played abroad with Sampdoria.

== Club career ==
Born in Braga, Hugo played during his early career with S.C. Braga, making his first-team – and Primeira Liga – debut at the age of 19. He moved to Italian club U.C. Sampdoria in 1997, being regularly used during his three-year stint but suffering Serie A relegation in his second season.

Hugo returned to Portugal in summer 2000, joining Sporting CP and being a member of the Lions squad that won both the league and the cup in 2002. Later that year, on 18 August, he started in the 2002 Supertaça Cândido de Oliveira, helping his side to a 1–5 victory over Leixões, although he was beaten by Henri Antchouet for the opponents' consolation goal. Notably, four days earlier, on 14 August, he shared the bench with Cristiano Ronaldo in a UEFA Champions League qualifying round against Inter Milan, but while he remained an unused substitute, Ronaldo came off in the second half to play his first-ever official senior football match.

After six seasons at Sporting, Hugo left as a free agent to Vitória de Setúbal, with whom he won the inaugural edition of the Taça da Liga. In his last season there (2008–09), he played the most games he had in years, but spent most of the campaign as defensive midfielder.

In 2009, the 33-year-old Hugo had his first second division experience when he signed for S.C. Beira-Mar, helping the Aveiro side win the league in his first year and return to the top flight, after a three-year absence. He stayed at Beira-Mar for four years, from 2009 until his retirement in 2013.

== Later life ==
In 2015, Vieira was appointed as the executive director of Braga's youth development, a position he held for five years, until 2020. Under his leadership, Braga's youth development became the second best in Portugal, only behind that of Sporting Clube de Portugal. Notably, he oversaw the discovery and rise of Roger Fernandes, who went on to become both the youngest player and the youngest goalscorer in the history of the Primeira Liga.

== Honours ==
Sporting

- Primeira Liga: 2001–02
- Taça de Portugal: 2001–02
- Supertaça Cândido de Oliveira: 2000, 2002

Vitória Setúbal

- Taça da Liga: 2007–08

Beira-Mar

- Segunda Liga: 2009–10
