= Elkin Calle =

Colombian footballer (born 1980)

Personal information
- Full name: Elkin Darío Calle Grajales
- Date of birth: May 26, 1980 (age 46)
- Place of birth: Medellín, Colombia
- Height: 1.76 m (5 ft 9 in)
- Position: Right back

Team information
- Current team: Cúcuta Deportivo

Senior career*
Years	Team	Apps	(Gls)
1998–2004	Atlético Nacional	200	(5)
2004	Envigado FC		
2005	Tiro Federal		
2005	Envigado FC		
2006	Atlético Huila		
2006	Envigado FC		
2007	Deportivo Pereira		
2007–2008	Independiente Medellín		
2008–2010	Deportivo Cali	52	(2)
2011	Once Caldas	40	(1)
2012–2015	Atlético Nacional	82	(3)
2015–	Cúcuta Deportivo	5	(0)

International career
2002–2004	Colombia	4	(0)
- * Club domestic league appearances and goals

Elkin Calle (born May 26, 1980) is a Colombian footballer currently playing for Cúcuta Deportivo of the Second Division of Colombia

== Honours ==
=== Club ===
Atlético Nacional

- Categoría Primera A (4): 1999, 2013-I, 2013-II, 2014-I
- Copa Merconorte (1): 2000
- Copa Colombia (2): 2012, 2013
- Superliga Colombiana (1): 2012

Deportivo Cali

- Copa Colombia (1): 2010
