= Ariel Montenegro =

Argentine former footballer (born 1975)

Personal information
- Full name: Ariel Alfredo Montenegro Casella
- Date of birth: 3 November 1975 (age 50)
- Place of birth: Buenos Aires, Argentina
- Height: 1.78 m (5 ft 10 in)
- Position: Midfielder

Senior career*
Years	Team	Apps	(Gls)
1995–1998	San Lorenzo	85	(11)
1998	Belgrano	19	(7)
1999–2000	Independiente	40	(5)
2000–2005	Córdoba	129	(19)
2005–2006	Pontevedra	17	(1)
2006	Numancia	19	(8)
2006–2008	Hércules	56	(8)
2008–2009	Gimnasia Jujuy	12	(2)
2009–2010	Lucena	25	(2)
2010–2012	Peñarroya		
Total		402+	(63+)
- * Club domestic league appearances and goals

Ariel Alfredo Montenegro Casella (born 3 November 1975) is an Argentine former professional footballer who played as a midfielder.

He also held an Italian passport, and spent most of his career in Spain, amassing Segunda División totals of 204 matches and 35 goals over eight seasons, mainly at the service of Córdoba.

== Club career ==
Born in Buenos Aires, Montenegro played in his country for San Lorenzo de Almagro, Club Atlético Belgrano and Club Atlético Independiente, teaming up with sibling Daniel in the latter side. He moved to Spain in 2000, signing with Segunda División's Córdoba CF and remaining in the country the following eight years, without however making his debut in La Liga; in the former tier, he also represented CD Numancia and Hércules CF.

In the latter nation, Montenegro appeared for Pontevedra CF and Lucena CF in the Segunda División B, returning to his homeland in between to play for Gimnasia y Esgrima de Jujuy. In 2010, he moved back to Spain and joined lowly Peñarroya CF, retiring at the age of 36 after one season with the club – his second – in the regional championships.

== Personal life ==
Montenegro's younger brother, Daniel, was also a footballer and a midfielder. He too played in Spain, and was an Argentina international.
