= Kormac Valdebenito =

Chilean footballer (born 1982)

Personal information
- Full name: Kormac Sidney Valdebenito Gómez
- Date of birth: 1 February 1982 (age 44)
- Place of birth: Valdivia, Chile
- Position: Midfielder

Youth career
- 1995–2011: Universidad Católica

Senior career*
| Years | Team | Apps | (Gls) |
| 2001–2004 | Universidad Católica | 12 | (1) |
| 2004 | Deportes Melipilla | 0 | (0) |
| 2005 | Deportes Puerto Montt | | |
| 2005 | Virginia Beach Mariners | | |
| 2005–2006 | Deportes Melipilla | 1 | (0) |
| 2006 | Puerto Rico Islanders | 19 | (5) |
| 2007 | Unión Española | 1 | (0) |

International career
| 1999 | Chile U17 | | |
- * Club domestic league appearances and goals

Kormac Sidney Valdebenito Gómez (born 1 February 1982) is a Chilean former professional footballer who played as a midfielder.

== Club career ==
Born in Valdivia, Valdebenito came to Universidad Católica youth system in 1995, after being watched by Jorge Alvial, a football agent, in a championship in his city of birth called Mundialito (Little World Cup), joining the first team thanks to coach Juvenal Olmos in 2001, with whom he won the Chilean Primera División title in 2002 Apertura.

In Chile he also played for Deportes Melipilla, Deportes Puerto Montt and Unión Española.

Abroad he played for USL First Division clubs Virginia Beach Mariners and Puerto Rico Islanders, where he was recommended by Jorge Alvial.

== International career ==
Valdebenito represented Chile at under-17 level in the 1999 South American Championship.

== Post-retirement ==
Valdebenito graduated as a football manager at the INAF (National Football Institute).

He works as a football agent, having been the representative of players such as Felipe Jaramillo, Jean Beausejour, Marco Estrada, Carlos Carmona, among others.

In 2010, he also worked as Sport Manager of Sportverein Jugendland Fussball from Peñaflor in the Chilean Tercera B, with Eduardo Bonvallet as coach.

== Honours ==
Universidad Católica

- Chilean Primera División: 2002 Apertura

Deportes Melipilla

- Primera B de Chile: 2004
