= Damián Luna =

Argentine footballer

Personal information
- Full name: Damián Oscar Luna
- Date of birth: 21 February 1985 (age 41)
- Place of birth: Buenos Aires, Argentina
- Height: 1.71 m (5 ft 7 in)
- Position: Midfielder

Youth career
- San Lorenzo

Senior career*
Years	Team	Apps	(Gls)
2002–2006	San Lorenzo	65	(6)
2006–2009	Independiente	8	(0)
2009	→ Universidad Católica (loan)	5	(1)
2009	São Caetano	4	(0)
2010–2011	Nueva Chicago	28	(1)
2011–2012	Los Andes	20	(4)
2012–2013	Defensor Sporting	13	(1)
2013–2014	Inti Gas	15	(1)
2014	Los Andes	9	(1)
2015	Kissamikos	0	(0)
2016–2017	San Lorenzo de Alem	19	(4)
2018	Águila	3	(0)
2018	Fénix	5	(0)
- * Club domestic league appearances and goals

Damián Oscar Luna (born 21 February 1985) is an Argentine former professional footballer who played as a midfielder.

== Career ==
Luna was born in Buenos Aires. A product of San Lorenzo de Almagro, he switched to Independiente in the second half of 2006.

On 13 May 2009, Luna was released by Universidad Católica, then on loan from Independiente, upon his request due to personal problems with coach Marco Antonio Figueroa.

In 2013, Luna moved to Peru and joined Inti Gas.

Luna ended his career in 2018 after playing for Salvadoran club Águila and Fénix in his homeland.

== Honours ==
San Lorenzo

- Copa Sudamericana: 2002
