= Pablo Michelini =

Argentine footballer

Personal information
- Full name: Pablo Andrés Michelini
- Date of birth: 7 October 1973 (age 53)
- Place of birth: Sunchales, Santa Fe Province, Argentina
- Height: 1.77 m (5 ft 10 in)
- Position: Midfielder

Senior career*
Years	Team	Apps	(Gls)
1991–1994	Deportivo Español	83	(3)
1994–1999	Racing Club	135	(4)
1999–2005	San Lorenzo	204	(11)
- * Club domestic league appearances and goals as of 14 December 2005

Pablo Andrés Michelini (born 7 October 1973) is an Argentine former professional footballer who played as a Midfielder.

== Career ==
He made his debut in 1992 in a 2–1 victory for Deportivo Español against Gimnasia de La Plata. During his time with the *Gallego*, he played 87 matches and scored 3 goals. In 1994, he moved to Racing, where he played for 5 seasons (167 matches and 4 goals). He was transferred to San Lorenzo in 1999, making his debut on August 29 of that year in his team's victory over Talleres de Córdoba. At San Lorenzo, he played 204 matches and scored 11 goals. Additionally, he won 3 titles: the 2001 Torneo Clausura, the 2001 Copa Mercosur, and the 2002 Copa Sudamericana.

He retired from professional football on July 2, 2005, in a match where San Lorenzo defeated Racing Club 1–0. He played only the first 5 minutes, during which he provided the assist for a goal by Germán Herrera just 2 minutes into the match. His decision to retire at the age of 31 was due to a severe, long-standing knee injury.

== Personal Life ==
After retiring, he served for eight months as the club's sporting director, a role he held on an unpaid (*ad honorem*) basis. He is currently involved in the hydrocarbon industry, where he owns several service stations.

== Honours ==
San Lorenzo

- Argentine Primera División: 2001-Clausura
- Copa Mercosur: 2001
- Copa Sudamericana: 2002

== External Link ==
- Pablo Andres Michelini at BDFA (in Spanish)
- https://es.besoccer.com/jugador/pablo-michelini-509317
- https://estadisticascasla.com/jugador/pablo-andres-michelini/
- https://www.bdfutbol.com/es/j/j62087.html?p=stats
