= Alberto Acosta =

Argentine footballer (born 1966)

Personal information
- Full name: Alberto Federico Acosta Tabizzi
- Date of birth: 23 August 1966 (age 60)
- Place of birth: Arocena, Argentina
- Height: 1.77 m (5 ft 10 in)
- Position: Striker

Youth career
- 1984–1986: 9 Julio Arocena

Senior career*
Years	Team	Apps	(Gls)
1986–1988	Unión Santa Fe	71	(15)
1988–1990	San Lorenzo	64	(34)
1990–1991	Toulouse	38	(6)
1991–1993	San Lorenzo	41	(19)
1993–1994	Boca Juniors	34	(10)
1994–1995	Universidad Católica	45	(43)
1996	Yokohama Marinos	21	(10)
1996–1997	Universidad Católica	25	(12)
1997–1998	San Lorenzo	32	(17)
1998–2001	Sporting CP	78	(39)
2001–2004	San Lorenzo	77	(32)
2009	Fénix	6	(2)
Total		532	(239)

International career
1992–1995	Argentina	19	(3)

Managerial career
- 2006–2007: Dunărea Galaţi
- 2007–2009: Fénix (assistant)
- 2009–2011: Fénix
Medal record
Men's football
Representing Argentina
Copa América
Winner	1993 Ecuador
FIFA Confederations Cup
Winner	1992 Saudi Arabia
CONMEBOL–UEFA Cup of Champions
Winner	1993 Argentina
- * Club domestic league appearances and goals

Alberto Federico 'Beto' Acosta Tabizzi (born 23 August 1966) is an Argentine former professional footballer who played as a striker.

In a professional career which spanned 18 years (nearly 700 official games and more than 250 goals), he played for San Lorenzo in four different spells. Additionally, he represented clubs in France, Chile, Japan and Portugal.

Acosta appeared with Argentina in two Copa América tournaments.

== Club career ==
Born in Arocena, Santa Fe Province, Acosta started playing professionally at Unión de Santa Fe, making his top division debut one month shy of his 20th birthday, in a 0–0 home draw against Argentinos Juniors. Two years later he transferred to San Lorenzo de Almagro, scoring 34 goals in his first two seasons combined, that being the first of the four spells with the club in an 18-year career.

In 1990 Acosta had his first abroad experience, with France's Toulouse FC. After a poor second season he left in December 1991, having played in seven matches with just one goal, with the club eventually ranking 16th – he returned to San Lorenzo, where he scored a further 19 league goals, which earned him a transfer to country giants Boca Juniors.

Acosta spent the following three years out of Argentina, starting and ending with Club Deportivo Universidad Católica in Chile where he rejoined former San Lorenzo teammate Néstor Gorosito. In 1994, he was crowned the top scorer in South American football, netting 33 times in only 25 matches. Also during that debut campaign, he was unable to further help the team for five matches (four after assaulting C.F. Universidad de Chile's Luis Musrri); in between his spell with Universidad, he played in the J1 League for Yokohama Marinos.

In December 1998, Acosta signed with Sporting Clube de Portugal. In his first full season, the 33-year-old striker scored 22 goals, helping the Lisbon side to the Primeira Liga championship after an 18-year wait. He added 14 the following campaign, but was deemed surplus to requirements after the signing of Mário Jardel, and returned to San Lorenzo for the fourth and last time, netting always in double digits until his 2004 retirement at the age of 37. Although still physically fit, the scorer of 300 goals in 666 official games opted to retire, instead of being coerced into retirement later on.

Acosta kickstarted his managerial career in Romania, with FCM Dunărea Galaţi. In the 2007 summer he returned to his country, joining fourth division team Club Atlético Fénix's coaching staff and coming out of retirement for a few months.

== International career ==
Having collected 19 caps for Argentina during three years, Acosta represented the nation in two Copa América tournaments. In the 1993 edition in Ecuador, he converted his penalty shootout attempts in both the quarter-finals and the semifinals, as the nation eventually emerged victorious.

== Career statistics ==
=== Club ===
Appearances and goals by club, season and competition
Club	Season	League		
Club	Season	Division	Apps	Goals
Unión de Santa Fe	1986–87	Argentine Primera División	39	7
Unión de Santa Fe	1987–88	Argentine Primera División	32	8
Unión de Santa Fe	Total		71	15
San Lorenzo	1988–89	Argentine Primera División	36	19
San Lorenzo	1989–90	Argentine Primera División	28	15
San Lorenzo	Total		64	34
Toulouse	1990–91	Ligue 1	31	6
Toulouse	1991–92	Ligue 1	7	0
Toulouse	Total		38	6
San Lorenzo	1991–92	Argentine Primera División	21	7
San Lorenzo	1992–93	Argentine Primera División	19	12
San Lorenzo	Total		40	19
Boca Juniors	1992–93	Argentine Primera División	18	7
Boca Juniors	1993–94	Argentine Primera División	16	4
Boca Juniors	Total		32	11
Universidad Católica	1994	Chilean Primera División	25	33
Universidad Católica	1995	Chilean Primera División	20	10
Universidad Católica	Total		45	43
Yokohama Marinos	1996	J1 League	21	10
Universidad Católica	1997	Chilean Primera División	25	12
San Lorenzo	1997–98	Argentine Primera División	19	9
San Lorenzo	1998–99	Argentine Primera División	13	8
San Lorenzo	Total		32	17
Sporting CP	1998–99	Primeira Liga	13	3
Sporting CP	1999–2000	Primeira Liga	33	22
Sporting CP	2000–01	Primeira Liga	32	14
Sporting CP	Total		78	39
San Lorenzo	2001–02	Argentine Primera División	29	11
San Lorenzo	2002–03	Argentine Primera División	30	11
San Lorenzo	2003–04	Argentine Primera División	18	10
San Lorenzo	Total		77	31
Career total			525	238

=== International ===
Appearances and goals by national team and year
National team	Year	Apps	Goals
Argentina	1992	6	1
Argentina	1993	9	0
Argentina	1994	0	0
Argentina	1995	4	2
Total		19	3

== Honours ==
Universidad Católica

- Copa Chile: 1995
- Chilean Primera División: Apertura 1997
- Copa Interamericana: 1993

Sporting CP

- Primeira Liga: 1999–2000
- Supertaça Cândido de Oliveira: 2000

San Lorenzo

- Copa Sudamericana: 2002
- Copa Mercosur: 2001

Argentina

- Kirin Cup: 1992
- FIFA Confederations Cup: 1992
- Copa América: 1993
- Artemio Franchi Cup: 1993

Individual

- Argentine Primera División top scorer: Apertura 1992 (12 goals)
- Chilean Primera División Player of the Year: 1994
- Chilean Primera División top scorer: 1994 (33 goals)
- Copa Chile top scorer: 1995 (10 goals)
- Copa Libertadores top scorer: 1997 (11 goals)
- Francisco Stromp Award: 2000
